= Algeria national rugby sevens team =

Rugby union sevens team

Algeria
- Nickname: The Lions
- Union: Algerian Rugby Federation
- Head coach: Boris Brahim Bouhraoua
First colours	Second colours

First international
- 2016

The Algeria national rugby sevens team is a sporting side that represents Algeria internationally in rugby sevens.It competes in the Africa Men's Sevens.

== History ==
The Algerian national team played its first official tournament on June 16 and 17, 2018, as part of the Montauban Rugby Sevens. The team was then led by brothers Boris and Terry Bouhraoua. The team take part to it first official competition, the 2019 Africa Men's Sevens qualification. The first game was held in 15 September 2018 against Benin.

== Tournament history ==
=== Summer Olympics ===
Olympic Games record
Year	Round	Pos	Pld	W	L	D	Qualifying
(Brazil) 2016	Did not enter						
(Japan) 2020	Did not qualify						Lost in SF of the Africa Men's Sevens Qualification
(France) 2024	Did not qualify						Lost in GS of the Africa Men's Sevens
Total	0 Titles	0/3	0	0	0	0	

=== Rugby World Cup Sevens ===
Rugby World Cup Sevens Record
Year	Round	Position	Pld	W	L	D
(Scotland) 1993	Did not enter					
(Hong Kong) 1997	Did not enter					
(Argentina) 2001	Did not enter					
(Hong Kong) 2005	Did not enter					
(United Arab Emirates) 2009	Did not enter					
(Russia) 2013	Did not enter					
(United States) 2018	Did not enter					
(South Africa) 2022	Did not enter					
2026	To be determined					
Total	0 Titles	0/8	0	0	0	0

=== Africa Men's Sevens ===
Africa Men's Sevens record
Year	Round	Position	Pld	W	L	D
(Kenya) 2000	Did not enter					
(Zambia) 2004	Did not enter					
(Tunisia) 2008	Did not enter					
(Morocco) 2012	Did not enter					
(Kenya) 2013	Did not enter					
(Zimbabwe) 2014	Did not enter					
(South Africa) 2015	Did not enter					
(Kenya) 2016	Did not enter					
(Uganda) 2017	Did not enter					
(Uganda) 2018	Did not enter					
(South Africa) 2019	Did not qualify					
(Uganda) 2022	Did not enter					
(Zimbabwe) 2023	Eleventh place	11th	5	1	0	4
(Mauritius) 2024	Eleventh place	11th	5	1	0	4
(Mauritius) 2025	Did not enter					
Total	0 Titles	2/15	10	2	0	8

=== Arab Rugby Sevens Men's Championship ===
Arab Rugby 7s Men's Championship record
Year	Round	Position	Pld	W	L	D
(Egypt) 2015	Did not enter					
(Morocco) 2016	Sixth place	6th	3	0	0	3
(Jordan) 2017	Did not enter					
(Egypt) 2018	Did not enter					
(Morocco) 2019	Fourth place	4th	6	2	0	4
(Egypt) 2021	Did not enter					
(Tunisia) 2022	Fifth place	5th	5	2	0	3
(United Arab Emirates) 2023	Did not enter					
(Saudi Arabia) 2024	Did not enter					
(Egypt) 2025	Did not enter					
(Egypt) 2026	To be determined					
Total	0 Titles	3/10	14	4	0	10
