= Philip Wokorach =

Ugandan rugby union player

- Full name: Philip Wokorach
- Born: 31 December 1993 (age 32) Kampala, Uganda
- Height: 187 cm (6 ft 2 in)
- Weight: 98 kg (216 lb; 15 st 6 lb)
- School: Hana Mixed International School
- University: Uganda Christian University
- Notable relative(s): Serafino Jabolo (father); Gwokto Thomas (brother)

Rugby union career
- Position: Flyhalf, Winger, Fullback
- Current team: Rugby club Orléans
Youth career
- 2002-20??: Kyadondo Heathens
- 20??-2011: Stallions Rugby Club
Senior career
Years	Team	Apps	(Points)
2011-2012	Toyota Buffaloes		
2012-2016	Kyadondo Heathens		
2015	→ Esher RFC	2	(15)
2016-2019	Kabras Sugar RFC		
2019-2020	Bourges XV	10	(10)
2020-2024	AS Bédarrides	61	(496)
2021	Monaco 7s		
2022	Wonder 7s	14	(173)
2023	Racing 92 7s	3	(20)
2024-	RC Orléans		
2025	Bengaluru Bravehearts	3	(17)
- Correct as of 28 December 2023
International career
Years	Team	Apps	(Points)
2016-	Uganda	29	(461)
- Correct as of 28 December 2023
National sevens team
Years	Team		Comps
2014-	Uganda 7s		34
- Correct as of 28 December 2023

Philip Wokorach (born 31 December 1993) is a Ugandan rugby union player who plays as a utility back for AS Bédarrides as well as playing sevens for Racing 92. He also runs the PW15 Foundation.

== Club career ==
=== Youth career ===
He began playing rugby at primary school playing tag rugby before joining Kyadondo Heathens in 2002. Initially he was split between following in his fathers footsteps and becoming a footballer, his father playing a midfielder for the Uganda Cranes, and playing rugby but in 2006 Kyadondo Heathens had trip to England where Wokorach got to visit Twickenham, this trip helped inspire him to stick with rugby. He later joined Stallions Rugby Club.

He led his school side, Hana Mixed International School, to the Uganda School League title in 2011 as well as coming runners up in the Blackrock Rugby Festival. He led the sevens side to victory at the Safari Sevens tournament. Wokorach was awarded Most Valuable Player in all three tournaments.

=== Toyota Buffaloes ===
In his first season of senior rugby Wokorach won the Uganda Rugby Union Young Player of the Year.

=== Kyadondo Heathens ===
He joined Kyadondo Heathens in the 2012–13 season. In March 2013, playing against Stanbic Black Pirates in the. Nile Special Premier League Semi-finals, he broke his right leg, originally thought to be a career ending injury he managed to return to full fitness in 8 months. Kyadondo Heathens won the double that year. He made his return in January 2014 coming off the bench as the Heathens beat Lira Bulls 114–05, Wokorach being named Man of the Match.

He scored two tries in the 2016 Uganda Cup final beating the Stanbic Black Pirates 20–17, winning their 4th consecutive title.

=== Esher RFC ===
In January 2015, he went to England to play for Esher RFC however in February he broke his left leg. Thought to be another career ending injury, he returned to Uganda.

=== Kabras Sugar RFC ===
He managed to return from the second broken leg within 8 months going on to play rugby in Kenya. He helped the Kakamega based side Kabras Sugar RFC to their first Kenya Cup title. Then coming runners up the following two seasons losing both times to Kenya Commercial Bank RFC, with Wokorach being the top points scorer in the 2018–19 season. Before leaving to move to France he was described as having "dominated the Kenyan (rugby) scene".

=== Boruges XV ===
He moved to France in 2019 to play in the Fédérale 3 (5th Division) signing a 9-month contract. He made his debut after only 3 training sessions, playing against Rugby Club Uzerchoison 13 October 2019. He helped the French side earn promotion to the Fédérale 2 (4th Division), before leaving the club to join AS Bédarrides.

=== AS Bédarrides ===
He joined French Fédérale 1 (3rd Division) AS Bédarrides in 2020, making only 5 appearances in his first season, before becoming a regular in the squad, featuring 24 and 23 times in the 2021–22 and 2022–23 seasons respectively. While at AS Bédarrides, he has featured for Monaco 7s and Racing 92 7s in the SuperSevens tournament coming runners up while playing for Monaco losing 14–40 against the French Barbarians. As well as in 2022 featuring for Wonder 7s as well.

== International career ==
=== Uganda Sevens ===
He made his debut in 2014 playing in the Commonwealth Games, being knocked out 32–0 against Canada in the Bowl competition. Wokorach has helped Uganda to 3 Africa Sevens titles, in 2016, 2017 and 2022. He featured in the 2018 and 2022 Rugby Sevens World Cup.

=== Uganda ===
He made his debut for Uganda in 2016, starting at fullback against rivals Kenya in the Elgon Cup losing 48–10 in Nairobi. He scored 4 tries in a 67–12 win over Tunisia in qualification for the 2019 Rugby World Cup.

== Activist work ==
He founded the PW15 Foundation in 2019, which is aimed at empowering talented young people to achieve their dreams running touch rugby tournaments to help get people into the sport. He has also called against the Uganda Rugby Union to invest more in schools, and worked with Rhino rugby to provide opportunities and equipment to disadvantaged youth.

He

He campaigned against child sex abuse and encouraged public engagement and participation from fellow rugby players. .

== Honors ==
=== Hana Mixed International School ===
- Ugandan Schools League: 2011 (champions)
- Blackrock Rugby Festival: 2011 (runners-up)
- Safari Sevens Schools: 2011 (champions)

=== Heathens RFC ===
- Uganda Cup: 2013, 2014, 2015, 2016 (champions)
- Nile Special Premier League: 2013 (champions)
- Uganda Sevens Cup: 2014 (champions)

=== Kabras Sugar RFC ===
- Kenya Cup: 2015-16 (champions)
- Kenya Cup: 2016–17, 2017-18 (runners-up)

=== Bourges XV ===
- Fédérale 3: 2019-20 (champions)

=== Monaco Sevens ===
- 2021 Super Sevens 2 (runners-up)
- 2021 Super Sevens 3 (champions)
- 2021 Super Sevens Final (runners-up)

=== Racing 92 Sevens ===
- 2023 Super Sevens 2 (third place)

=== Uganda Sevens ===
- Africa Sevens: 2016, 2017, 2022 (champions)
- Africa Sevens: 2019 (runners up)
- Africa Sevens: 2018, 2023 (third place)

=== Uganda ===
- Africa Cup: 2016, 2017, 2018 (third place)
- Elgon Cup: 2019

=== Personal ===
- 2011 Uganda Schools League MVP
- 2011 Blackrock Rugby Festival MVP
- 2011 Safari Sevens Schools MVP
- 2012 Uganda Rugby Union Young Player of the Year
- 2016 Uganda Sports Press Association Player of the Year
- 2017 Uganda Sports Press Association Player of the Year

== See also ==
- Allan Musoke
