= Morocco national rugby sevens team =

Morocco
- Union: Royal Moroccan Rugby Federation

World Cup Sevens
- Appearances: 1 (First in 1997)
- Best result: Bowl Semi-finals (1997)

The Morocco national rugby sevens team has competed in various international tournaments, including the Hong Kong Sevens. Morocco participated at the 2016 Hong Kong Sevens, they reached the quarterfinals of the World Series Qualifier.

== History ==
In the 2026 Africa Men's Sevens Series, Morocco achieved 3rd place after defeating Zambia 19–17, thus claiming the bronze medal.

== Tournament history ==
=== Rugby World Cup Sevens ===
Rugby World Cup Sevens Record
Year	Round	Position	Pld	W	L	D
(Scotland) 1993	Did not qualify					
(Hong Kong) 1997	Bowl Semifinalist	19th	6	1	5	0
(Argentina) 2001	Did not qualify					
(Hong Kong) 2005	Did not qualify					
(United Arab Emirates) 2009	Did not enter					
(Russia) 2013	Did not qualify					
(United States) 2018	Did not qualify					
(South Africa) 2022	Did not qualify					
Total	0 Titles	1/8	6	1	5	0

=== Africa Men's Sevens ===
Africa Men's Sevens record
Year	Position
(Zimbabwe) 2000	Did not compete
(Zambia) 2004	Did not compete
(Tunisia) 2008	Did not compete
(Morocco) 2012	7th
(Kenya) 2013	5th
(Zimbabwe) 2014	Did not compete
(South Africa) 2015	3rd
(Kenya) 2016	8th
(Uganda) 2017	7th
(Tunisia) 2018	8th
(South Africa) 2019	10th
(Uganda) 2022	Did not compete
(Zimbabwe) 2023	Did not compete
(Mauritius) 2024	Did not compete
(Mauritius) 2025	Did not compete
(Uganda) 2026	3rd
Total	0 Titles

=== Arab Rugby Sevens Men's Championship ===
Arab Rugby Sevens Men's Championship Record
Year	Position
(Egypt) 2015	Winner
(Morocco) 2016	Winner
(Jordan) 2017	Winner
(Egypt) 2018	Did not enter
(Jordan) 2019	Did not enter
(Egypt) 2021	Did not enter
(Tunisia) 2022	Did not enter
(United Arab Emirates) 2023	Did not enter
(Saudi Arabia) 2024	Winner
(Egypt) 2025	Runner-up
Total	4 Titles

=== Hong Kong Sevens ===
Year	Venue	Cup			Plate	
Year	Venue	Winner	Final Score	Runner-up	Winner	Runner-up
1998	Hong Kong Stadium	Fiji	28-19	Western Samoa	South Korea	Morocco
2002	Hong Kong Stadium	England	33-20	Fiji	South Africa	Morocco

== Honors ==
Africa Men's Sevens

- Third-place: 2015, 2026

Arab Rugby Sevens Men's Championship

- Champions: 2015, 2016, 2017, 2024
