= 2012 African Sevens Championship =

The 2012 African Sevens was an international rugby sevens competition organized by the Confederation of African Rugby. It was the fourth edition of the African Sevens, which had been held every four years since the year 2000, and served as the African continental qualifier for the 2013 Rugby World Cup Sevens. The tournament, hosted together with 2012 African Women's Sevens, was held in Rabat on September 29–30, 2012.

== General ==
The tournament was played at Stade Bourgogne in the Moroccan city of Rabat. The event was attended by eight rugby sevens nations. On the first day they were playing in two groups of four. The second day there were places at stake was not only the medals of the event, but also two places in the finals of 2013 World Cup.

The teams from South Africa and Kenya, who had already qualified for the World Cup, did not compete. In their absence, Zimbabwe won the competition, defeating Tunisia in the final. The two finalists gained promotion to the World Cup in 2013.

== Group stage ==
=== Group A ===
Teams	Pld	W	D	L	PF	PA	+/−	Pts
Madagascar	3	3	0	0	74	34	+40	9
Nigeria	3	2	0	1	48	27	+21	7
Zambia	3	1	0	2	27	62	-35	5
Morocco	3	0	0	3	17	43	-26	3

29 September 2012

Morocco	0–10	Zambia

Stade Bourgogne

29 September 2012

Madagascar	15–12	Nigeria

Stade Bourgogne

29 September 2012

Madagascar	45–12	Zambia

Stade Bourgogne

29 September 2012

Morocco	7–19	Nigeria

Stade Bourgogne

29 September 2012

Nigeria	17–5	Zambia

Stade Bourgogne

29 September 2012

Morocco	10–14	Madagascar

Stade Bourgogne

=== Group B ===
Teams	Pld	W	D	L	PF	PA	+/−	Pts
Zimbabwe	3	3	0	0	62	14	+48	9
Tunisia	3	2	0	1	55	10	+45	7
Ivory Coast	3	1	0	2	26	74	-48	5
Namibia	3	0	0	3	17	62	-45	3

29 September 2012

Zimbabwe	26–7	Ivory Coast

Stade Bourgogne

29 September 2012

Tunisia	17–0	Namibia

Stade Bourgogne

29 September 2012

Tunisia	38–0	Ivory Coast

Stade Bourgogne

29 September 2012

Zimbabwe	26–7	Namibia

Stade Bourgogne

29 September 2012

Namibia	10–19	Ivory Coast

Stade Bourgogne

29 September 2012

Zimbabwe	10–0	Tunisia

Stade Bourgogne

== Knockout phase ==
=== Bowl (5th–8th places) ===
Semi-finals
30 September 2012 – Stade Bourgogne
Zambia	10
Namibia	22
30 September 2012 – Stade Bourgogne
Ivory Coast	12
Morocco	7

Final
30 September 2012 – Stade Bourgogne
Namibia	24
Ivory Coast	7
Third place
30 September 2012 - Stade Bourgogne
Zambia	5
Morocco	14

=== Cup ===
Semi-finals
30 September 2012 – Stade Bourgogne
Madagascar	0
Tunisia	7
30 September 2012 – Stade Bourgogne
Zimbabwe	19
Nigeria	14

Final
30 September 2012 – Stade Bourgogne
Tunisia	12
Zimbabwe	33
Third place
30 September 2012 - Stade Bourgogne
Madagascar	12
Nigeria	19

== Outright ==
Rank	Nation	Notes
1	Zimbabwe	promoted to 2013 World Cup
2	Tunisia	promoted to 2013 World Cup
3	Nigeria	
4	Madagascar	
5	Namibia	
6	Ivory Coast	
7	Morocco	
8	Zambia	
