= 2024 Africa Men's Sevens =

Rugby sevens tournament in Mauritius

- Hosts: Mauritius
- Date: 29 June – 7 July 2024
- Nations: 12

Final positions
- Champions: Uganda
- Runners-up: South Africa A
- Third: Madagascar

The 2024 Africa Men's Sevens is the 14th edition of the Africa Men's Sevens, an annual African rugby sevens tournament. Event takes place at the Labourdonnais Sports Grounds, Mauritius between 29 and 30 June and 6 and 7 July 2024.

Twelve teams participate.

== Format ==
Teams will play in two tournaments across two weekends in Mauritius. The winner is decided by a series table.

== Teams ==
Ghana withdrew before the tournament and were replaced by South Africa.

- Algeria
- Burkina Faso
- Ivory Coast
- Kenya
- Madagascar
- Mauritius
- Nigeria
- South Africa A
- Tunisia
- Uganda
- Zambia
- Zimbabwe

== Standings ==
2024 Africa Men's Sevens
| Pos | Event Team | Leg 1 | Leg 2 | Points total |
|---|---|---|---|---|
| 1 | Uganda | 20 | 20 | 40 |
| 2 | South Africa A | 16 | 18 | 34 |
| 3 | Madagascar | 18 | 14 | 32 |
| 4 | Zimbabwe | 12 | 16 | 28 |
| 5 | Burkina Faso | 14 | 12 | 26 |
| 6 | Kenya | 10 | 10 | 20 |
| 7 | Ivory Coast | 8 | 4 | 12 |
| 8 | Zambia | 4 | 8 | 12 |
| 9 | Tunisia | 2 | 6 | 8 |
| 10 | Mauritius | 6 | 1 | 7 |
| 11 | Nigeria | 3 | 3 | 6 |
| 12 | Algeria | 1 | 2 | 3 |

Legend
| Green fill | Core team for the 2024–25 SVNS |
| Blue fill | Entry to World Challenger Series |

== Leg 1 ==
=== Pool A ===
| Team | W | D | L | PF | PA | PD | Pts |
|---|---|---|---|---|---|---|---|
| Madagascar | 3 | 0 | 0 | 76 | 47 | +29 | 9 |
| Kenya | 2 | 0 | 1 | 70 | 7 | +63 | 7 |
| Mauritius | 1 | 0 | 2 | 54 | 80 | –26 | 5 |
| Nigeria | 0 | 0 | 3 | 19 | 85 | –66 | 3 |

29 June
10:28

| Madagascar | 34–14 | Nigeria |

29 June
10:50

| Kenya | 40–0 | Mauritius |

29 June
13:12

| Madagascar | 35–28 | Mauritius |

29 June
13:34

| Kenya | 25–0 | Nigeria |

29 June
15:56

| Nigeria | 5–26 | Mauritius |

29 June
16:18

| Madagascar | 7–5 | Kenya |

=== Pool B ===
| Team | W | D | L | PF | PA | PD | Pts |
|---|---|---|---|---|---|---|---|
| Uganda | 3 | 0 | 0 | 94 | 17 | +77 | 9 |
| Burkina Faso | 2 | 0 | 1 | 41 | 48 | –7 | 7 |
| Ivory Coast | 1 | 0 | 2 | 63 | 44 | +19 | 5 |
| Tunisia | 0 | 0 | 3 | 12 | 101 | –89 | 3 |

29 June
09:44

| Burkina Faso | 24–7 | Tunisia |

29 June
10:06

| Uganda | 22–17 | Ivory Coast |

29 June
12:28

| Burkina Faso | 17–12 | Ivory Coast |

29 June
12:50

| Uganda | 43–0 | Tunisia |

29 June
15:12

| Tunisia | 5–34 | Ivory Coast |

29 June
15:34

| Burkina Faso | 0–29 | Uganda |

=== Pool C ===
| Team | W | D | L | PF | PA | PD | Pts |
|---|---|---|---|---|---|---|---|
| South Africa A | 3 | 0 | 0 | 90 | 22 | +68 | 9 |
| Zimbabwe | 2 | 0 | 1 | 91 | 31 | +60 | 7 |
| Zambia | 1 | 0 | 2 | 53 | 72 | –19 | 5 |
| Algeria | 0 | 0 | 3 | 17 | 126 | –109 | 3 |

29 June
09:00

| Zambia | 7–31 | South Africa A |

29 June
09:22

| Zimbabwe | 52–0 | Algeria |

29 June
11:44

| Zambia | 34–12 | Algeria |

29 June
12:06

| South Africa A | 19–10 | Zimbabwe |

29 June
14:50

| South Africa A | 40–5 | Algeria |

29 June
16:40

| Zimbabwe | 29–12 | Zambia |

=== 9th to 12th playoffs ===
9th place semifinals
30 June 2024
Zambia | 28
Algeria | 21
30 June 2024
Nigeria | 19
Tunisia | 5

9th place final
30 June 2024
Zambia | 22
Nigeria | 7
11th place final
30 June 2024
Algeria | 10
Tunisia | 14

=== 5th to 8th playoffs ===
5th place semifinals
30 June 2024
Ivory Coast | 5
Kenya | 22
30 June 2024
Zimbabwe | 42
Mauritius | 7

5th place final
30 June 2024
Kenya | 19
Zimbabwe | 28
7th place final
30 June 2024
Ivory Coast (aet) | 24
Mauritius | 19

=== Cup ===
Quarterfinals
30 June 2024
Uganda | 15
Ivory Coast | 10
30 June 2024
South Africa A | 12
Kenya | 7
30 June 2024
Burkina Faso | 24
Zimbabwe | 21
30 June 2024
Madagascar | 12
Mauritius | 5

Semifinals
30 June 2024
Uganda | 12
South Africa A | 0
30 June 2024
Burkina Faso | 19
Madagascar | 24 (a.e.t.)

Final
30 June 2024
Uganda | 31
Madagascar | 12
3rd place final
30 June 2024
South Africa A | 35
Burkina Faso | 7

== Leg 2 ==
=== Pool A ===
| Team | W | D | L | PF | PA | PD | Pts |
|---|---|---|---|---|---|---|---|
| Uganda | 3 | 0 | 0 | 79 | 24 | +55 | 9 |
| Burkina Faso | 2 | 0 | 1 | 58 | 40 | +18 | 7 |
| Tunisia | 1 | 0 | 2 | 45 | 67 | –22 | 5 |
| Ivory Coast | 0 | 0 | 3 | 38 | 89 | –51 | 3 |

6 July
10:28

| Burkina Faso | 29–12 | Ivory Coast |

6 July
10:50

| Uganda | 36–0 | Tunisia |

6 July
13:12

| Burkina Faso | 19–14 | Tunisia |

6 July
13:34

| Uganda | 29–14 | Ivory Coast |

6 July
15:56

| Ivory Coast | 12–31 | Tunisia |

6 July
16:18

| Uganda | 14–10 | Burkina Faso |

=== Pool B ===
| Team | W | D | L | PF | PA | PD | Pts |
|---|---|---|---|---|---|---|---|
| Madagascar | 3 | 0 | 0 | 97 | 31 | +66 | 9 |
| Kenya | 2 | 0 | 1 | 92 | 31 | +61 | 7 |
| Zambia | 1 | 0 | 2 | 45 | 66 | –21 | 5 |
| Algeria | 0 | 0 | 3 | 7 | 113 | –106 | 3 |

6 July
09:44

| Kenya | 26–7 | Zambia |

6 July
10:06

| Madagascar | 33–7 | Algeria |

6 July
12:28

| Kenya | 47–0 | Algeria |

6 July
12:50

| Madagascar | 40–5 | Zambia |

6 July
15:12

| Zambia | 33–0 | Algeria |

6 July
15:34

| Madagascar | 24–19 | Kenya |

=== Pool C ===
| Team | W | D | L | PF | PA | PD | Pts |
|---|---|---|---|---|---|---|---|
| South Africa A | 3 | 0 | 0 | 112 | 19 | +93 | 9 |
| Zimbabwe | 2 | 0 | 1 | 72 | 36 | +36 | 7 |
| Nigeria | 1 | 0 | 2 | 36 | 79 | –43 | 5 |
| Mauritius | 0 | 0 | 3 | 12 | 98 | –86 | 3 |

6 July
09:00

| Zimbabwe | 31–7 | Mauritius |

6 July
09:22

| South Africa A | 45–7 | Nigeria |

6 July
11:44

| Zimbabwe | 29–5 | Nigeria |

6 July
12:06

| South Africa A | 43–0 | Mauritius |

6 July
16:40

| South Africa A | 24–12 | Zimbabwe |

6 July
17:02

| Mauritius | 5–24 | Nigeria |

=== 9th to 12th playoffs ===
9th place semifinals
7 July 2024
Algeria | 5
Nigeria | 27
7 July 2024
Ivory Coast | 22
Mauritius | 0

9th place final
7 July 2024
Nigeria | 10
Ivory Coast | 17
11th place final
7 July 2024
Algeria | 22
Mauritius | 14

=== 5th to 8th playoffs ===
5th place semifinals
7 July 2024
Tunisia | 5
Burkina Faso | 21
7 July 2024
Kenya | 29
Zambia | 5

5th place final
7 July 2024
Burkina Faso | 21
Kenya | 12
7th place final
7 July 2024
Tunisia | 12
Zambia | 17

=== Cup ===
Quarterfinals
7 July 2024
Madagascar | 7
Tunisia | 0
7 July 2024
South Africa A | 27
Burkina Faso | 5
7 July 2024
Kenya | 7
Zimbabwe | 10
7 July 2024
Uganda | 32
Zambia | 0

Semifinals
7 July 2024
Madagascar | 14
South Africa A | 36
7 July 2024
Zimbabwe | 7
Uganda | 24

Final
7 July 2024
South Africa A | 17
Uganda | 20
3rd place final
7 July 2024
Madagascar | 10
Zimbabwe | 19
