= 2019 Africa Men's Sevens =

- Hosts: South Africa
- Date: 8–9 November
- Nations: 14

Final positions
- Champions: Kenya
- Runners-up: Uganda
- Third: Zimbabwe

The 2019 Africa Men's Sevens was a rugby sevens tournament held in Johannesburg on 8–9 November 2019. It was the seventh championship in Africa Men's Sevens, a series that began in 2013.

This tournament also served as a qualifying tournament for the 2020 Summer Olympics, with the champion team Kenya advancing.

The next two best-placed teams, Uganda and Zimbabwe were eligible to compete at a final Olympic qualifier tournament, as well as the 2020 World Rugby Sevens Challenger Series.

== 2018 Africa Regional Sevens – West ==
On 15–16 September 2018, eight teams took part in a regional tournament at Abidjan, Ivory Coast. The highest ranking teams, Ivory Coast and Nigeria, advanced based on their top two finishes. All times in Greenwich Mean Time (UTC±00:00).

Pool Stage

Pool A

Teams	Pld	W	D	L	PF	PA	+/−	Pts
Ivory Coast	3	3	0	0	65	12	+53	9
Burkina Faso	3	2	0	1	59	24	+35	7
Mali	3	1	0	2	20	37	–17	5
Guinea	3	0	0	3	10	81	–71	3

15 September 2018
11:00

Ivory Coast	26–0	Guinea

15 September 2018
11:22

Burkina Faso	12–0	Mali

15 September 2018
12:50

Ivory Coast	20–5	Mali

15 September 2018
13:12

Burkina Faso	40–5	Guinea

15 September 2018
14:40

Ivory Coast	19–7	Burkina Faso

15 September 2018
15:02

Mali	15–5	Guinea

Pool B

Teams	Pld	W	D	L	PF	PA	+/−	Pts
Nigeria	3	3	0	0	72	0	+72	9
Algeria	3	2	0	1	32	17	+15	7
Niger	3	1	0	2	19	48	–29	5
Benin	3	0	0	3	14	72	–58	3

15 September 2018
11:44

Nigeria	26–0	Niger

15 September 2018
12:06

Algeria	17–7	Benin

15 September 2018
13:34

Nigeria	36–0	Benin

15 September 2018
13:56

Algeria	15–0	Niger

15 September 2018
15:24

Nigeria	10–0	Algeria

15 September 2018
15:46

Benin	7–19	Niger

Knockout stage

Plate

Semi-finals
16 September - 10:00
Niger	22
Guinea	0
16 September - 10:22
Mali	5
Benin	0

Plate Final
16 September - 11:50
Niger	5
Mali	10
Seventh place
16 September - 11:28
Guinea	0
Benin	24

Africa Sevens Qualification

Semi-finals
16 September - 10:44
Ivory Coast	10
Algeria	7
16 September - 11:06
Nigeria	17
Burkina Faso	7

Cup/Africa Sevens Qualification
16 September - 12:34
Ivory Coast	22
Nigeria	17
Third place
16 September - 12:12
Algeria	0
Burkina Faso	29

== Main tournament ==
All times in South African Standard Time (UTC+02:00)

=== Teams ===
The order of teams is based upon seeding from the prior year's tournament's placement.

1. Zimbabwe
2. Kenya
3. Uganda
4. Madagascar
5. Zambia
6. Tunisia
7. Senegal
8. Morocco
9. Namibia
10. Ghana
11. Botswana
12. Mauritius
13. Ivory Coast
14. Nigeria

=== Opening round ===
8 November 2019
9:00

Zimbabwe	24–21	Nigeria

Bosman Stadium

8 November 2019
9:22

Kenya	36–7	Ivory Coast

Bosman Stadium

8 November 2019
9:44

Uganda	57–0	Mauritius

Bosman Stadium

8 November 2019
10:06

Madagascar	38–12	Botswana

Bosman Stadium

8 November 2019
10:28

Zambia	19–7	Ghana

Bosman Stadium

8 November 2019
10:50

Tunisia	21–26	Namibia

Bosman Stadium

8 November 2019
11:12

Senegal	29–17	Morocco

Bosman Stadium

=== Pool stage ===
The teams were allocated to pools according to the results of the opening round:

Pool A: Winners of matches 1, 4, and 5, and the losing team with the smallest losing margin

Pool B: Winners of matches 2, 3, 6, and 7

Pool C: The losing teams with the 2nd, 5th, and 6th smallest losing margins

Pool D: The losing teams with the 3rd, 4th, and 7th smallest losing margins

==== Pool A (Championship) ====
Team	Pld	W	D	L	PF	PA	PD	Pts
Zimbabwe	3	3	0	0	81	19	+62	9
Madagascar	3	2	0	1	93	43	+50	7
Zambia	3	1	0	2	47	59	–12	5
Nigeria	3	0	0	3	19	119	–100	3

8 November
12:43

Madagascar	28–21	Zambia

Bosman Stadium

8 November
13:05

Zimbabwe	47–0	Nigeria

Bosman Stadium

8 November
15:25

Madagascar	53–7	Nigeria

Bosman Stadium

8 November
15:47

Zimbabwe	19–7	Zambia

Bosman Stadium

9 November
9:44

Zambia	19–12	Nigeria

Bosman Stadium

9 November
10:06

Zimbabwe	15–12	Madagascar

Bosman Stadium

==== Pool B (Championship) ====
Team	Pld	W	D	L	PF	PA	PD	Pts
Kenya	3	3	0	0	107	7	+100	9
Uganda	3	2	0	1	94	53	+41	7
Namibia	3	1	0	2	55	87	–32	5
Senegal	3	0	0	3	31	140	–109	3

8 November
13:27

Uganda	35–17	Namibia

Bosman Stadium

8 November
13:49

Kenya	50–0	Senegal

Bosman Stadium

8 November
16:09

Uganda	52–12	Senegal

Bosman Stadium

8 November
16:31

Kenya	33–0	Namibia

Bosman Stadium

9 November
10:28

Namibia	38–19	Senegal

Bosman Stadium

9 November
10:50

Kenya	24–7	Uganda

Bosman Stadium

==== Pool C (Consolation) ====
Team	Pld	W	D	L	PF	PA	PD	Pts
Ivory Coast	2	2	0	0	68	20	+48	6
Tunisia	2	1	0	1	33	33	–	4
Botswana	2	0	0	2	22	70	–48	2

8 November
11:59

Tunisia	5–26	Ivory Coast

Bosman Stadium

8 November
14:41

Botswana	15–42	Ivory Coast

Bosman Stadium

9 November
9:00

Tunisia	28–7	Botswana

Bosman Stadium

==== Pool D (Consolation) ====
Team	Pld	W	D	L	PF	PA	PD	Pts
Morocco	2	2	0	0	34	26	+8	6
Ghana	2	1	0	1	50	22	+28	4
Mauritius	2	0	0	2	31	67	–36	2

8 November
12:21

Morocco	24–19	Mauritius

Bosman Stadium

8 November
15:03

Ghana	43–12	Mauritius

Bosman Stadium

9 November
9:22

Morocco	10–7	Ghana

Bosman Stadium

=== Knockout stage ===
13th place play-off

9 November
12:16

Botswana	0–31	Mauritius

Bosman Stadium

Ninth place play-off

Semi-finals
9 November – 11:32 – Bosman Stadium
Ivory Coast	15
Ghana	19
9 November – 11:54 – Bosman Stadium
Morocco	28
Tunisia	21

Ninth place
9 November – 14:50 - Bosman Stadium
Ghana	33
Morocco	10
Eleventh place
9 November - 14:28 – Bosman Stadium
Ivory Coast	14
Tunisia	19

7th place play-off

9 November
14:06

Nigeria	12–14	Senegal

Bosman Stadium

5th place play-off

9 November
13:44

Zambia	5–28	Namibia

Bosman Stadium

Olympic Qualification

Semi-finals
9 November – 12:38 – Bosman Stadium
Zimbabwe	12
Uganda	21
9 November – 13:00 – Bosman Stadium
Kenya	40
Madagascar	14

Final
9 November – 15:34 – Bosman Stadium
Uganda	0
Kenya	29
Third place
9 November – 15:12 – Bosman Stadium
Zimbabwe	24
Madagascar	7

== Placings ==
Place	Team	Qualification
1st place, gold medalist(s)	Kenya	Direct qualification to the Olympic Sevens for 2020
2nd place, silver medalist(s)	Uganda	Entry to Olympic qualifier and World Rugby Challenger Series for 2020
3rd place, bronze medalist(s)	Zimbabwe	Entry to Olympic qualifier and World Rugby Challenger Series for 2020
4	Madagascar	
5	Namibia	
6	Zambia	
7	Senegal	
8	Nigeria	
9	Ghana	
10	Morocco	
11	Tunisia	
12	Ivory Coast	
13	Mauritius	
14	Botswana	

Legend
Green fill	Direct qualification to the Olympic Sevens
Blue fill	Entry to Olympic qualifier and World Rugby Challenger Series
Dark bar	Already a core team in World Series
