= 2023 Africa Men's Sevens =

Rugby sevens tournament in Mauritius

- Hosts: Mauritius (Qualifier); Zimbabwe (Final tournament)
- Date: 24–25 June 2023 (Qualifier); 16–17 September 2023 (Final tournament)
- Nations: 12 (Qualifier); 12 (Final tournament)

Final positions
- Champions: Kenya
- Runners-up: South Africa
- Third: Uganda

The 2023 Africa Men's Sevens was the 13th edition of the Africa Men's Sevens, an annual African rugby sevens tournament. The qualifier event took place at the Labourdonnais Sports Grounds in Mauritius between 24 and 25 June 2023. The main event took place at Harare Sports Club in Harare, Zimbabwe. The winner qualified for the 2024 Olympics in Paris, and the second and third placed teams qualified for the 2024 Final Olympic Qualification Tournament. In addition, the top two teams qualified for the 2024 Challenger Series.

Twelve teams participated in each tournament

== Format ==
Teams are seeded according to their performances in the previous championship. The top eight teams from the previous championship entered the main tournament, while the remaining twelve entered the qualifier.

== Teams ==
The following teams entered the qualification tournament:

- Algeria
- Botswana
- Burundi
- Cameroon
- DR Congo
- Egypt
- Ghana
- Ivory Coast
- Lesotho
- Mauritius
- Nigeria
- Senegal

The following teams entered the main tournament:

- Burkina Faso
- Kenya
- Madagascar
- Namibia
- South Africa
- Tunisia
- Uganda
- Zambia
- Zimbabwe
- Algeria
- Nigeria
- Ivory Coast

== Qualifier event ==
=== Pool stage ===
Legend
Advanced to quarter finals
Potential quarter finals

Pool A

Team	Pld	W	D	L	PF	PA	PD	Pts
Nigeria	3	3	0	0	110	21	+89	9
Ghana	3	2	0	1	96	31	+65	7
Burundi	3	1	0	2	42	101	–59	5
DR Congo	3	0	0	3	17	112	–95	3

Ghana	7–24	Nigeria

Burundi	21–17	DR Congo

Ghana	48–0	DR Congo

Burundi	14–43	Nigeria

Ghana	41–7	Burundi

DR Congo	0–43	Nigeria

Pool B

Team	Pld	W	D	L	PF	PA	PD	Pts
Algeria	3	3	0	0	91	12	+79	9
Mauritius	3	2	0	1	65	21	+44	7
Botswana	3	1	0	2	21	72	–51	5
Lesotho	3	0	0	3	19	91	–72	3

Mauritius	5–14	Algeria

Botswana	14–12	Lesotho

Mauritius	29–7	Lesotho

Botswana	7–29	Algeria

Mauritius	31–0	Botswana

Lesotho	0–48	Algeria

Pool C

Team	Pld	W	D	L	PF	PA	PD	Pts
Senegal	3	3	0	0	70	40	+30	9
Ivory Coast	3	2	0	1	69	27	+42	7
Egypt	3	1	0	2	33	57	–24	5
Cameroon	3	0	0	3	31	79	–48	3

Senegal	15–14	Ivory Coast

Egypt	21–5	Cameroon

Ivory Coast	27–7	Cameroon

Egypt	7–24	Senegal

Ivory Coast	28–5	Egypt

Cameroon	19–31	Senegal

==== Knockout stage ====
9th place

Semi-finals
Burundi	36
DR Congo	17
Cameroon	15
Lesotho	5

Ninth place
Burundi	17
Cameroon	33
Eleventh place
DR Congo	0
Lesotho	15

5th place

Semi-finals
Egypt	7
Senegal	26
Mauritius	36
Botswana	0

Fifth place
Senegal	12
Mauritius	14
Seventh place
Egypt	14
Botswana	12

Cup

Quarter-finals
Algeria	33
Egypt	7
Senegal	19
Ghana	22
Mauritius	10
Ivory Coast	12
Nigeria	33
Botswana	5

Semi-finals
Algeria	29
Ghana	10
Ivory Coast	12
Nigeria	20

Final
Algeria	24
Nigeria	5
Third place
Ghana	10
Ivory Coast	28

==== Standings ====
Legend
Qualified for Main Tournament

Rank	Team
1st place, gold medalist(s)	Algeria
2nd place, silver medalist(s)	Nigeria
3rd place, bronze medalist(s)	Ivory Coast
4	Ghana
5	Mauritius
6	Senegal
7	Egypt
8	Botswana
9	Cameroon
10	Burundi
11	Lesotho
12	DR Congo

== Final tournament ==
=== Pool stage ===
Legend
Advanced to quarter finals
Potential quarter finals

Pool A

Team	Pld	W	D	L	PF	PA	PD	Pts
South Africa	3	3	0	0	120	14	+106	9
Madagascar	3	2	0	1	97	48	+49	7
Tunisia	3	1	0	2	38	91	–53	5
Ivory Coast	3	0	0	3	10	112	–102	3

16 September	Madagascar	43–5	Tunisia	Harare Sports Club, Harare
10:28

16 September	South Africa	39–0	Ivory Coast	Harare Sports Club, Harare
10:50

16 September	Madagascar	40–5	Ivory Coast	Harare Sports Club, Harare
13:12

16 September	South Africa	43–0	Tunisia	Harare Sports Club, Harare
13:34

16 September	South Africa	38–14	Madagascar	Harare Sports Club, Harare
16:18

16 September	Tunisia	33–5	Ivory Coast	Harare Sports Club, Harare
15:36

Pool B

Team	Pld	W	D	L	PF	PA	PD	Pts
Kenya	3	3	0	0	122	22	+100	9
Zambia	3	2	0	1	81	62	+19	7
Nigeria	3	1	0	2	44	91	–47	5
Namibia	3	0	0	3	31	103	–72	3

16 September	Zambia	31–12	Namibia	Harare Sports Club, Harare
09:44

16 September	Kenya	34–10	Nigeria	Harare Sports Club, Harare
10:06

16 September	Zambia	38–12	Nigeria	Harare Sports Club, Harare
12:28

16 September	Kenya	50–0	Namibia	Harare Sports Club, Harare
12:50

16 September	Namibia	19–22	Nigeria	Harare Sports Club, Harare
15:12

16 September	Kenya	38–12	Zambia	Harare Sports Club, Harare
15:34

Pool C

Team	Pld	W	D	L	PF	PA	PD	Pts
Zimbabwe	3	2	1	0	94	22	+72	8
Uganda	3	2	0	1	86	61	+25	7
Burkina Faso	3	1	1	1	72	55	+17	6
Algeria	3	0	0	3	19	133	–114	3

16 September	Zimbabwe	12–12	Burkina Faso	Harare Sports Club, Harare
09:00

16 September	Uganda	45–7	Algeria	Harare Sports Club, Harare
09:22

16 September	Zimbabwe	47–5	Algeria	Harare Sports Club, Harare
11:44

16 September	Uganda	36–19	Burkina Faso	Harare Sports Club, Harare
12:04

16 September	Algeria	7–41	Burkina Faso	Harare Sports Club, Harare
14:50

16 September	Uganda	5–35	Zimbabwe	Harare Sports Club, Harare
16:40

==== Knockout stage ====
9th place

Semi-finals
Tunisia	19
Algeria	14
Namibia	24
Ivory Coast	22

Ninth place
Tunisia	19
Namibia	14
Eleventh place
Algeria	26
Ivory Coast	19

5th place

Semi-finals
Burkina Faso	24
Madagascar	19
Zambia	28
Nigeria	12

Fifth place
Burkina Faso	26
Zambia	33
Seventh place
Madagascar	43
Nigeria	17

Cup

Quarter-finals
Kenya	26
Burkina Faso	0
Zimbabwe	26
Madagascar	10
Zambia	15
Uganda	29
South Africa	27
Nigeria	0

Semi-finals
Kenya	33
Zimbabwe	10
Uganda	14
South Africa	26

Final
Kenya	17
South Africa	12
Third place
Zimbabwe	12
Uganda	24

==== Standings ====
Legend
Qualified for 2024 Summer Olympics
Qualified for Olympic Repechage

Rank	Team
1st place, gold medalist(s)	Kenya
2nd place, silver medalist(s)	South Africa
3rd place, bronze medalist(s)	Uganda
4	Zimbabwe
5	Zambia
6	Burkina Faso
7	Madagascar
8	Nigeria
9	Tunisia
10	Namibia
11	Algeria
12	Ivory Coast
