= 2015 Africa Cup Sevens =

- Hosts: South Africa
- Date: 14–15 November
- Nations: 12 (finals)

Final positions
- Champions: Kenya
- Runners-up: Zimbabwe
- Third: Morocco

The 2015 RA Africa Cup Sevens is an Olympic qualification tournament for rugby sevens at the 2016 Summer Olympics held in Kempton Park, Gauteng, South Africa on 14–15 November 2015. It was the 3rd championship in a series that began in 2013.

The tournament qualified directly for the Olympics, while the second, third, and fourth place teams earned spots in the 2016 Men's Rugby Sevens Final Olympic Qualification Tournament.

== Qualifications ==
=== North Qualifying ===
Note: Cameroon was scheduled to compete, but was unable to attend. Morocco took their spot in the competition.

==== Pool Stage ====
Key to colours in group tables
Teams that advanced to the Cup Semifinal

===== Pool A =====
Teams	Pld	W	D	L	PF	PA	+/−	Pts
Ivory Coast	2	2	0	0	27	10	+17	6
Togo	2	1	0	1	24	24	E	4
Ghana	2	0	0	2	22	39	–17	2

6 June 2015

Ivory Coast	15 - 10	Ghana

Lomé

6 June 2015

Togo	24 - 12	Ghana

Lomé

6 June 2015

Ivory Coast	12 – 0	Togo

Lomé

===== Pool B =====
Teams	Pld	W	D	L	PF	PA	+/−	Pts
Morocco	2	2	0	0	68	7	+61	6
Nigeria	2	1	0	1	43	21	+22	4
Mali	2	0	0	2	0	83	–83	2

6 June 2015

Nigeria	36 - 0	Mali

Lome

6 June 2015

Morocco	47 - 0	Mali

Lomé

6 June 2015

Nigeria	7 – 21	Morocco

Lomé

==== Knockout stage ====
===== Bowl =====
Final
7 June 2015 – Lomé
Ghana	27
Mali	7

===== Plate =====
Semi-finals
7 June 2015 – Lomé
Ivory Coast	5
Nigeria	14
7 June 2015 – Lomé
Morocco	29
Togo	0

Final
7 June 2015 – Lomé
Ivory Coast	26
Togo	5

===== Cup =====
Semi-finals
7 June 2015 – Lomé
Ivory Coast	5
Nigeria	14
7 June 2015 – Lomé
Morocco	29
Togo	0

Final
7 June 2015 – Lomé
Nigeria	7
Morocco	34

==== Final North Qualifying standings ====
Legend
Qualified for the Rugby Africa Olympic tournament

Rank	Team
1st place, gold medalist(s)	Morocco
2nd place, silver medalist(s)	Nigeria
3rd place, bronze medalist(s)	Ivory Coast
4	Togo
5	Ghana
6	Mali

=== South Qualifying ===
Note: Zambia has already qualified for the 2015 Rugby Africa Men's Sevens Championships after receiving the 8th Qualification spot with South Africa qualifying directly to the Olympics and no longer participating in the Championships

==== Pool Stage ====
Key to colours in group tables
Teams that advanced to the Cup Semifinal

===== Pool A =====
Teams	Pld	W	D	L	PF	PA	+/−	Pts
Zambia	2	2	0	0	46	19	+27	6
Botswana	2	1	0	1	45	21	+24	4
Burundi	2	0	0	2	7	58	–51	2

26 July 2015

Botswana	12 - 21	Zambia

Kigali

26 July 2015

Burundi	7 - 25	Zambia

Kigali

26 July 2015

Botswana	33 – 0	Burundi

Kigali

===== Pool B =====
Teams	Pld	W	D	L	PF	PA	+/−	Pts
Mauritius	2	2	0	0	38	12	+26	6
Congo	2	1	0	1	45	45	E	4
Rwanda	2	0	0	2	21	47	–26	2

26 July 2015

Mauritius	24 - 12	Congo

Kigali

26 July 2015

Rwanda	21 - 33	Congo

Kigali

26 July 2015

Mauritius	14 – 0	Rwanda

Kigali

==== Knockout stage ====
===== Bowl =====
Final
27 July 2015 – Kigali
Burundi	0
Rwanda	19

===== Plate =====
Semi-finals
27 July 2015 – Kigali
Zambia	40
Congo	7
27 July 2015 – Kigali
Mauritius	35
Botswana	26

Final
27 July 2015 – Kigali
Congo	17
Botswana	24

===== Cup =====
Semi-finals
27 July 2015 – Kigali
Zambia	40
Congo	7
27 July 2015 – Kigali
Mauritius	35
Botswana	26

Final
27 July 2015 – Kigali
Zambia	38
Mauritius	21

==== Final South Qualifying standings ====
Legend
Qualified for the Rugby Africa Olympic tournament

Rank	Team
1st place, gold medalist(s)	Zambia
2nd place, silver medalist(s)	Mauritius
3rd place, bronze medalist(s)	Botswana
4	Congo
5	Rwanda
6	Burundi

== Final Tournament ==
=== Teams ===
- Kenya
- Madagascar
- Namibia
- Senegal
- Tunisia
- Uganda
- Zambia
- Zimbabwe
- Morocco (North Qualifier)
- Nigeria (North Qualifier)
- Mauritius (South Qualifier)
- Botswana (South Qualifier)

South Africa already qualified for the Olympics by finishing 2nd in 2014–15 Sevens World Series. Zambia was then given the final spot by finishing the previous tournament in 9th place

=== Pool Stage ===
Teams ranked 1-8 qualify for Cup Quarterfinals.

All times SAST (UTC+2)

Key to colours in group tables
Teams that advanced to the Cup Quarterfinal

==== Pool A ====
Team	Pld	W	D	L	PF	PA	PD	Pts
Kenya	3	3	0	0	123	5	+118	9
Madagascar	3	1	0	2	60	92	–32	5
Senegal	3	1	0	2	36	77	–41	5
Mauritius	3	1	0	2	51	96	–45	5

14 November 2015
10:00

Kenya	50–5	Mauritius

Barnard Stadium, Kempton Park, Johannesburg

14 November 2015
11:06

Madagascar	33–17	Senegal

Barnard Stadium, Kempton Park, Johannesburg

14 November 2015
12:42

Kenya	27–0	Senegal

Barnard Stadium, Kempton Park, Johannesburg

14 November 2015
13:48

Madagascar	27–29	Mauritius

Barnard Stadium, Kempton Park, Johannesburg

14 November 2015
15:14

Kenya	46–0	Madagascar

Barnard Stadium, Kempton Park, Johannesburg

14 November 2015
16:20

Senegal	19–17	Mauritius

Barnard Stadium, Kempton Park, Johannesburg

==== Pool B ====
Team	Pld	W	D	L	PF	PA	PD	Pts
Zimbabwe	3	3	0	0	122	12	+110	9
Uganda	3	2	0	1	66	60	+6	7
Nigeria	3	1	0	2	43	64	–21	5
Zambia	3	0	0	3	19	114	–95	3

14 November 2015
10:22

Zimbabwe	31–12	Nigeria

Barnard Stadium, Kempton Park, Johannesburg

14 November 2015
11:28

Uganda	47–5	Zambia

Barnard Stadium, Kempton Park, Johannesburg

14 November 2015
13:04

Zimbabwe	48–0	Zambia

Barnard Stadium, Kempton Park, Johannesburg

14 November 2015
14:10

Uganda	19–12	Nigeria

Barnard Stadium, Kempton Park, Johannesburg

14 November 2015
15:36

Zimbabwe	43–0	Uganda

Barnard Stadium, Kempton Park, Johannesburg

14 November 2015
16:42

Zambia	14–19	Nigeria

Barnard Stadium, Kempton Park, Johannesburg

==== Pool C ====
Team	Pld	W	D	L	PF	PA	PD	Pts
Namibia	3	3	0	0	102	31	+71	9
Tunisia	3	2	0	1	55	69	-14	7
Morocco	3	1	0	2	83	50	+33	5
Botswana	3	0	0	3	12	102	–90	3

14 November 2015
10:44

Tunisia	24–7	Botswana

Barnard Stadium, Kempton Park, Johannesburg

14 November 2015
11:50

Namibia	24–21	Morocco

Barnard Stadium, Kempton Park, Johannesburg

14 November 2015
13:26

Tunisia	21–17	Morocco

Barnard Stadium, Kempton Park, Johannesburg

14 November 2015
14:32

Namibia	33–0	Botswana

Barnard Stadium, Kempton Park, Johannesburg

14 November 2015
15:58

Tunisia	10–45	Namibia

Barnard Stadium, Kempton Park, Johannesburg

14 November 2015
17:04

Morocco	45–5	Botswana

Barnard Stadium, Kempton Park, Johannesburg

=== Placement Stage ===
==== Final Tournament Bowl ====
Team	Pld	W	D	L	PF	PA	PD	Pts
Botswana (11)	3	3	0	0	67	42	+25	9
Mauritius (10)	3	1	0	2	71	43	+28	5
Senegal (9)	3	1	0	2	59	74	-15	5
Zambia (12)	3	1	0	2	45	83	-38	5

15 November 2015
10:00

Senegal	40-10	Zambia

Barnard Stadium, Kempton Park, Johannesburg

15 November 2015
10:22

Mauritius	14–17	Botswana

Barnard Stadium, Kempton Park, Johannesburg

15 November 2015
12:44

Senegal	14–24	Botswana

Barnard Stadium, Kempton Park, Johannesburg

15 November 2015
13:06

Mauritius	17–21	Zambia

Barnard Stadium, Kempton Park, Johannesburg

15 November 2015
15:28

Botswana	26–14	Zambia

Barnard Stadium, Kempton Park, Johannesburg

15 November 2015
15:50

Senegal	5–40	Mauritius

Barnard Stadium, Kempton Park, Johannesburg

==== Final Tournament Plate ====
Semi-finals
15 November 2015 - 13:28 - Johannesburg
Madagascar	24
Uganda	7
15 November 2015 - 13:53 - Johannesburg
Namibia	39
Nigeria	5

Final
15 November 2015 - 16:37 - Johannesburg
Madagascar	17
Namibia	24
Third place
15 November 2015 - 16:12 - Johannesburg
Uganda	27
Nigeria	7

===== Semi-finals =====
15 November 2015
13:28

Madagascar	24–7	Uganda

Barnard Stadium, Kempton Park, Johannesburg

15 November 2015
13:53

Namibia	39–5	Nigeria

Barnard Stadium, Kempton Park, Johannesburg

===== Seventh place match =====
15 November 2015
16:12

Uganda	27–7	Nigeria

Barnard Stadium, Kempton Park, Johannesburg

===== Plate final match =====
15 November 2015
16:37

Madagascar	17–24	Namibia

Barnard Stadium, Kempton Park, Johannesburg

==== Final Tournament Cup ====
Quarter-finals
15 November 2015 - 10:44 - Johannesburg
Kenya (1)	41
Madagascar (8)	0
15 November 2015 - 11:09 - Johannesburg
Uganda (4)	14
Tunisia (5)	19
15 November 2015 - 11:34 - Johannesburg
Namibia (3)	15
Morocco (6)	17
15 November 2015 - 11:59 - Johannesburg
Zimbabwe (2)	31
Nigeria (7)	10

Semi-finals
15 November 2015 - 14:18 - Johannesburg
Kenya	42
Tunisia	12
15 November 2015 - 14:43 - Johannesburg
Morocco	0
Zimbabwe	26

Final
15 November 2015 - 17:27 - Johannesburg
Kenya	21
Zimbabwe	17
Third place
15 November 2015 - 17:02 - Johannesburg
Tunisia	12
Morocco	19

===== Quarter-finals =====
15 November 2015
10:44

Kenya	41–0	Madagascar

Barnard Stadium, Kempton Park, Johannesburg

15 November 2015
11:09

Uganda	14–19	Tunisia

Barnard Stadium, Kempton Park, Johannesburg

15 November 2015
11:34

Namibia	15–17	Morocco

Barnard Stadium, Kempton Park, Johannesburg

15 November 2015
11:59

Zimbabwe	31–10	Nigeria

Barnard Stadium, Kempton Park, Johannesburg

===== Semi-finals =====
15 November 2015
14:18

Kenya	42–12	Tunisia

Barnard Stadium, Kempton Park, Johannesburg

15 November 2015
14:43

Morocco	0–26	Zimbabwe

Barnard Stadium, Kempton Park, Johannesburg

===== Third place match =====
15 November 2015
17:02

Tunisia	12–19	Morocco

Barnard Stadium, Kempton Park, Johannesburg

===== Final =====
15 November 2015
17:27

Kenya	21–17	Zimbabwe

Barnard Stadium, Kempton Park, Johannesburg

== Final standings ==
Legend
Qualified for the 2016 Summer Olympics.
Qualified for the 2016 Men's Rugby Sevens Final Olympic Qualification Tournament.

Rank	Team
1st place, gold medalist(s)	Kenya
2nd place, silver medalist(s)	Zimbabwe
3rd place, bronze medalist(s)	Morocco
4	Tunisia
5	Namibia
6	Madagascar
7	Uganda
8	Nigeria
9	Botswana
10	Mauritius
11	Senegal
12	Zambia

== See also ==
- 2015 Rugby Africa Women's Sevens Championships
