= Arab Rugby Sevens Men's Championship =

Arab Rugby 7s Men's Championship
- Current season or competition: 2025 Arab Rugby Sevens Men's Championship
- Sport: Rugby sevens
- Instituted: 2015
- Governing body: Arab World (ARF)
- Holders: United Arab Emirates (2025)
- Most titles: Morocco (4 titles)

The Arab Rugby Sevens Men's Championship (Arabic: البطولة العربية لسباعيات الرجبي للرجال), is an annual rugby sevens tournament involving Arab nations, organised by the Arab Rugby Federation. It is contested on an annual basis.

== History ==
Since the 2024 edition, the name of the competition changed from Tournament to Championship.

== Results by year ==
Year	Host	Final			Third place match		
Year	Host	Winner	Score	Runner-up	Third	Score	Fourth
2015	El Gouna, Egypt	Morocco	38–0	Egypt	United Arab Emirates	31–7	Saudi Arabia
2016	Marrakesh, Morocco	Morocco	29–14	Tunisia	United Arab Emirates	No TPM	Lebanon
2017	Amman, Jordan	Morocco	17–0	Egypt	Jordan	14–0	United Arab Emirates
2018	Maadi, Cairo, Egypt	Egypt	22–0	United Arab Emirates	Jordan	21–12	Libya
2019	Amman, Jordan	Jordan	19–14	Egypt	United Arab Emirates	5–0	Algeria
2020	Cancelled due to the COVID-19 pandemic in Arab world						
2021	Alexandria, Egypt	Egypt	14–0	Lebanon	United Arab Emirates	19–7	Syria
2022	Tunis, Tunisia	Tunisia	55–0	Libya	Egypt	28–0	United Arab Emirates
2023	Al Ain, United Arab Emirates	UA Emirates	15–10	Tunisia	Libya	19–12	Egypt
2024	Taif, Saudi Arabia	Morocco	19–14	United Arab Emirates	Tunisia	19–7	Egypt
2025	Alexandria, Egypt	United Arab Emirates	14–7	Morocco	Egypt	17–0	Libya
2026	..., Egypt	Futur event					

== Team Records ==
Team	Champions	Runners-up	Third	Fourth
Morocco	4 (2015, 2016*, 2017, 2024)	1 (2025)	–	–
Egypt	2 (2018*, 2021*)	3 (2015*, 2017, 2019)	2 (2022, 2025*)	2 (2023, 2024)
United Arab Emirates	2 (2023*, 2025)	2 (2018, 2024)	4 (2015, 2016, 2019, 2021)	2 (2017, 2022)
Tunisia	1 (2022*)	2 (2016, 2023)	1 (2024)	–
Jordan	1 (2019*)	–	2 (2017*, 2018)	–
Libya	–	1 (2022)	1 (2023)	2 (2018, 2025)
Lebanon	–	1 (2021)	–	1 (2016)
Saudi Arabia	–	–	–	1 (2015)
Algeria	–	–	–	1 (2019)
Syria	–	–	–	1 (2021)

* hosts
Updated to 2023

== National team appearances in the Arab Rugby Sevens Championship ==
Team	(Egypt) 2015	(Morocco) 2016^{1}	(Jordan) 2017	(Egypt) 2018	(Jordan) 2019	(Egypt) 2021	(Tunisia) 2022^{2}	(United Arab Emirates) 2023	(Saudi Arabia) 2024	(Egypt) 2025	(Egypt) 2026	Apps.
Africa
Algeria		6th			4th		5th					3
Egypt	2nd		2nd	1st	2nd	1st	3rd	4th	4th	3rd	Q	9
Libya		••	6th	4th		5th	2nd	3rd	6th	4th		7
Morocco	1st	1st	1st						1st	2nd		5
Sudan				6th	6th	7th						3
Tunisia		2nd					1st	2nd	3rd			4
Asia
Iraq			7th	5th		6th			8th	7th		5
Jordan			3rd	3rd	1st			5th	7th	6th		6
Lebanon		5th	5th			2nd				5th		4
Palestine			8th		5th	8th		8th	10th	9th		6
Saudi Arabia	4th						8th	6th	5th	8th		5
Syria						4th	6th	7th	9th	••		4
United Arab Emirates	3rd	4th	4th	2nd	3rd	3rd	4th	1st	2nd	1st		10
Team	4	6	8	6	6	8	8	8	10	9		

^{1} Morocco B replaced Libya and took third place
^{2} Tunisia B took seventh place

- R1 — Round 1 (pool stage)
- Q — Qualified
- •• — Invited but declined or qualified but withdrew
- • — Did not qualify
- × — Expelled after qualification/Disqualified
- — Did not enter or withdrew from qualifying
- — Hosts

== See also ==
- Arab Rugby Sevens Women's Championship
- Africa Men's Sevens
- Asia Rugby Sevens Series
