= Quewin Nortje =

South African rugby union player

- Born: 14 January 2003 (age 23) South Africa
- Height: 182 cm (6 ft 0 in)
- Weight: 83 kg (183 lb)
- School: Afrikaanse Hoër Seunskool

Rugby union career
- Position: Wing
- Current team: Blue Bulls
Senior career
Years	Team	Apps	(Points)
2022–	Blue Bulls	3	(0)
- Correct as of 30 March 2023
International career
Years	Team	Apps	(Points)
2023-present	South Africa Sevens	0	(0)
Medal record
Men's rugby sevens
Representing South Africa
Olympic Games
Bronze medal – third place	2024 Paris	Team competition
Africa Men's Sevens
Silver medal – second place	2024 Mauritius	Team competition

Quewin Nortje (born 14 January 2003) is a South African rugby union player for the Blue Bulls in the Currie Cup. His regular position is wing.

Nortje was named in the Blue Bulls side for the 2022 Currie Cup Premier Division. He made his debut for the Blue Bulls in Round 14 of the 2022 Currie Cup Premier Division against the Free State Cheetahs.

In 2023 Nortje was named in the Juniors Springboks squad for the Under 20 World Championship. He made his debut against Italy and received a Player of the Match award in the third place playoff against England.

Nortje was named in the South African Sevens squad for the 2024 season, making his debut at the Dubai SVNS on 2 December 2023 against Samoa. He was also nominated for the SVNS Rookie of the year award in 2024 after being South Africa’s top try scorer throughout the season.

In 2024, He competed for South Africa at the 2024 Summer Olympics in Paris. He later sustained an injury during the event and was replaced by Ronald Brown.
