= 2016 Africa Cup Sevens =

Rugby sevens tournament

- Hosts: Kenya
- Date: 23–24 September
- Nations: 12

Final positions
- Champions: Uganda
- Runners-up: Namibia
- Third: Kenya

The 2016 RA Africa Cup Sevens was a rugby sevens tournament held in Safaricom Stadium, Nairobi, Kenya on 23–24 September 2016. It was the 4th championship in a series that began in 2013.

The top two placed teams (excluding Kenya) will qualify to the 2017 Hong Kong Sevens, where they will have a chance to earn core team status in the Sevens World Series

== Teams ==
- Kenya
- Madagascar
- Namibia
- Senegal
- Tunisia
- Uganda
- Zambia
- Zimbabwe
- Morocco
- Nigeria
- Mauritius
- Botswana

== Pool Stage ==
Teams ranked 1-4 qualify to Cup Semi-finals Teams ranked 5-8 qualify to Plate semi-finals Teams ranked 9-12 go into relegation semi-finals

All times Eastern Africa Time (UTC+3)

Key to colours in group tables
| Teams that advanced to the Cup Semi-final |
| Teams that advanced to relegation semi-finals |

=== Pool A ===
| Team | Pld | W | D | L | PF | PA | PD | Pts |
|---|---|---|---|---|---|---|---|---|
| Kenya | 2 | 2 | 0 | 0 | 64 | 5 | +59 | 6 |
| Nigeria | 2 | 1 | 0 | 1 | 41 | 38 | +3 | 4 |
| Senegal | 2 | 0 | 0 | 2 | 5 | 67 | –62 | 2 |

23 September 2016
12:06

| Kenya | 33-5 | Nigeria |

23 September 2016
15:36

| Senegal | 5-36 | Nigeria |

23 September 2016
19:14

| Kenya | 31-0 | Senegal |

=== Pool B ===
| Team | Pld | W | D | L | PF | PA | PD | Pts |
|---|---|---|---|---|---|---|---|---|
| Uganda | 2 | 2 | 0 | 0 | 54 | 21 | +33 | 6 |
| Zimbabwe | 2 | 1 | 0 | 1 | 68 | 19 | +49 | 4 |
| Mauritius | 2 | 0 | 0 | 2 | 7 | 89 | –82 | 2 |

23 September 2016
11:44

| Zimbabwe | 14-19 | Uganda |

23 September 2016
15:14

| Mauritius | 7-35 | Uganda |

23 September 2016
18:54

| Zimbabwe | 54-0 | Mauritius |

=== Pool C ===
| Team | Pld | W | D | L | PF | PA | PD | Pts |
|---|---|---|---|---|---|---|---|---|
| Madagascar | 2 | 2 | 0 | 0 | 59 | 0 | +59 | 6 |
| Morocco | 2 | 1 | 0 | 1 | 22 | 31 | -9 | 4 |
| Zambia | 2 | 0 | 0 | 2 | 12 | 62 | –50 | 2 |

23 September 2016
11:22

| Morocco | 0-19 | Madagascar |

23 September 2016
14:52

| Zambia | 0-40 | Madagascar |

23 September 2016
18:32

| Morocco | 22-12 | Zambia |

=== Pool D ===
| Team | Pld | W | D | L | PF | PA | PD | Pts |
|---|---|---|---|---|---|---|---|---|
| Namibia | 2 | 2 | 0 | 0 | 36 | 12 | +24 | 6 |
| Tunisia | 2 | 1 | 0 | 1 | 24 | 24 | 0 | 4 |
| Botswana | 2 | 0 | 0 | 2 | 14 | 38 | –24 | 2 |

23 September 2016
11:00

| Tunisia | 5-17 | Namibia |

23 September 2016
14:30

| Botswana | 7-19 | Namibia |

23 September 2016
18:10

| Tunisia | 19-7 | Botswana |

== Knockout stage ==
Relegation Semi-Final

Semi-finals
24 Sept - 11:12
Botswana (9) | 24
Mauritius (12) | 21
24 Sept - 11:34
Zambia (10) | 14
Senegal (11) | 24

Final
24 Sept - 15:58
Botswana | 0
Senegal | 55
Third place
24 Sept - 15:36
Mauritius | 0
Zambia | 45

Plate Semi-final

Semi-finals
24 Sept - 11:56
Zimbabwe (5) | 24
Morocco (8) | 5
24 Sept - 12:18
Nigeria (6) | 7
Tunisia (7) | 12

Final
24 Sept - 16:42
Zimbabwe | 14
Tunisia | 7
Third place
24 Sept - 16:20
Morocco | 5
Nigeria | 12

Cup Semi-final

Semi-finals
24 Sept - 12:40
Madagascar (1) | 7
Namibia (4) | 10
24 Sept - 13:02
Kenya (2) | 12
Uganda (3) | 17

Final
24 Sept - 17:26
Namibia | 19
Uganda | 38
Third place
24 Sept - 17:04
Madagascar | 0
Kenya | 46

== Final standings ==
Legend
Winner and qualified for the 2017 Hong Kong Sevens
Qualified for the 2017 Hong Kong Sevens.
Relegated

| Rank | Team |
|---|---|
| 1st place, gold medalist(s) | Uganda |
| 2nd place, silver medalist(s) | Namibia |
| 3rd place, bronze medalist(s) | Kenya |
| 4 | Madagascar |
| 5 | Zimbabwe |
| 6 | Tunisia |
| 7 | Nigeria |
| 8 | Morocco |
| 9 | Senegal |
| 10 | Botswana |
| 11 | Zambia |
| 12 | Mauritius |
