= Africa Men's Sevens =

African rugby sevens tournament

- Sport: Rugby sevens
- Instituted: 2000
- Governing body: Africa (Rugby Africa)
- Holders: Zimbabwe (2026)
- Most titles: Kenya (6 titles)

Logo in 2013.

The Africa Men's Sevens, formerly the Africa Cup Sevens, is an annual rugby sevens tournament involving African nations, organised by Rugby Africa. Since 2013 the event has been contested on an annual basis.

The tournament is also acts as a qualifying event for the Rugby World Cup Sevens and Olympic Rugby Sevens as required.

== History ==
On 9 July 2026, Rugby Africa announced a new format that would witness a two-tournament structure designed to strengthen the continent's competitiveness.

== Results by year ==
Winners and runners-up for official Rugby Africa and IRB (WR) sevens tournaments:

Year	Host	Final			Third place match			Refs
Year	Host	Winner	Score	Runner-up	Third	Score	Fourth	Refs
African Sevens Championship
2000	Nairobi, Kenya	Zimbabwe	26–14	Kenya	Namibia	33–21	Tunisia	
2004	Lusaka, Zambia	Kenya	33–14	Namibia	Uganda	24–19	Zimbabwe	
2008	Tunis, Tunisia	Kenya	26–14	Zimbabwe	Tunisia	26–12	Namibia	
2012	Rabat, Morocco	Zimbabwe	33–12	Tunisia	Nigeria	19–12	Madagascar	
2013	Mombasa, Kenya	Kenya	24–19	Zimbabwe	Tunisia	31–5	Madagascar	
2014	Harare, Zimbabwe	South Africa	38–5	Kenya	Zimbabwe	41–5	Tunisia	
Africa Cup Sevens
2015	Johannesburg, South Africa	Kenya	21–17	Zimbabwe	Morocco	19–12	Tunisia	
2016	Nairobi, Kenya	Uganda	38–19	Namibia	Kenya	46–0	Madagascar	
2017	Kampala, Uganda	Uganda	10–7	Zimbabwe	Madagascar	26–7	Zambia	
Africa Men's Sevens
2018	Monastir, Tunisia	Zimbabwe	17–5	Kenya	Uganda	24–19	Madagascar	
2019	Johannesburg, South Africa	Kenya	29–0	Uganda	Zimbabwe	24–7	Madagascar	
2020	Canceled due to the COVID-19 pandemic in Africa							
2021	Canceled due to the COVID-19 pandemic in Africa							
2022	Kampala, Uganda	Uganda	28–0	Zimbabwe	Kenya	19–12	Zambia	
2023	Harare, Zimbabwe	Kenya	17–12	South Africa	Uganda	24–12	Zimbabwe	
2024	Mapou, Mauritius	Uganda	^{n/a}	South Africa	Madagascar	^{n/a}	Zimbabwe	
2025	Port Louis, Mauritius	South Africa	26–12	Madagascar	Zimbabwe	21–19	Kenya	
2026	Kampala, Uganda (Uganda Edition)	Zimbabwe	26–19	Uganda	Morocco	19–17	Zambia	
2026	Cascavelle, Mauritius (Mauritius Edition)	Kenya	15–12	Madagascar	South Africa	22–14	Burkina Faso	

^n/a Classification determined after two legs.

== Team Records ==
Team	Champions	Runners-up	Third	Fourth
Kenya	7 (2004, 2008, 2013, 2015, 2019, 2023, 2026)	3 (2000, 2014, 2018)	2 (2016, 2022)	1 (2025)
Zimbabwe	4 (2000, 2012, 2018, 2026)	5 (2008, 2013, 2015, 2017, 2022)	2 (2014, 2019)	3 (2004, 2023, 2024)
Uganda	4 (2016, 2017, 2022, 2024)	2 (2019, 2026)	3 (2004, 2018, 2023)	–
South Africa	2 (2014, 2025)	2 (2023, 2024)	1 (2026)	–
Namibia	–	2 (2004, 2016)	1 (2000)	1 (2008)
Madagascar	–	2 (2025, 2026)	2 (2017, 2024)	5 (2012, 2013, 2016, 2018, 2019)
Tunisia	–	1 (2012)	2 (2008, 2013)	3 (2000, 2014, 2015)
Morocco	–	–	2 (2015, 2026)	–
Nigeria	–	–	1 (2012)	–
Zambia	–	–	–	3 (2017, 2022, 2026)
Burkina Faso	–	–	–	1 (2026)

Note – Table updated up to the 2026 championships. Years styled in italics when the associated team competed on home soil.

== Results by nation ==
Team	(Kenya) 2000	(Zambia) 2004	(Tunisia) 2008	(Morocco) 2012	(Kenya) 2013	(Zimbabwe) 2014	(South Africa) 2015	(Kenya) 2016	(Uganda) 2017	(Tunisia) 2018	(South Africa) 2019	(Uganda) 2022	(Zimbabwe) 2023	(Mauritius) 2024	(Mauritius) 2025	(Mauritius) 2026	Years
Algeria													11th	12th			2
Botswana	8th	GS	9th			10th	9th	10th	8th	11th	14th	12th					10
Burkina Faso												7th	6th	5th	9th	4th	5
Burundi												14th					1
Cameroon												13th					1
Egypt																8th	1
Eswatini	7th	GS															2
Ghana									9th	10th	9th	10th			8th		6
Ivory Coast	5th			6th	12th	12th					12th		12th	7th	12th		8
Kazakhstan	9th	—N/a															1
Kenya	2nd	1st	1st		1st	2nd	1st	3rd		2nd	1st	3rd	1st	6th	4th	1st	14
Madagascar	=9th	GS	5th	4th	4th	7th	6th	4th	3rd	4th	4th	5th	7th	3rd	2nd	2nd	16
Mauritius							10th	12th	10th	12th	13th	9th		10th	11th	7th	9
Morocco				7th	5th		3rd	8th	7th	8th	10th						9
Namibia	3rd	2nd	4th	5th	11th	5th	5th	2nd		9th	5th	8th	10th			6th	13
Nigeria				3rd	8th	11th	8th	7th			8th		8th	11th	7th		9
Réunion																5th	1
Senegal			8th		10th	8th	11th	9th	6th	7th	7th	11th					9
South Africa						1st	dne				dne		2nd	2nd	1st	3rd	5
Tunisia	4th		3rd	2nd	3rd	4th	4th	6th	5th	6th	11th	6th	9th	9th	10th		14
Uganda	6th	3rd	7th		7th	5th	7th	1st	1st	3rd	2nd	1st	3rd	1st	5th		14
Zambia	=9th	GS	6th	8th	9th	9th	12th	11th	4th	5th	6th	4th	5th	8th	6th		15
Zimbabwe	1st	4th	2nd	1st	2nd	3rd	2nd	5th	2nd	1st	3rd	2nd	4th	4th	3rd		15
Total	12 (Note: Botswana participated with two teams (first and B teams).)	8	10 (Note: Tunisia participated with two teams (first and B teams).)	8	12 (Note: Kenya participated with two teams (first and B teams).)	12	12	12	10	12	14	14	12	12	12	12	

== See also ==
- Africa Cup
- Africa Women's Sevens
