= 2025 World Rugby Sevens Challenger Series – Men's tour =

Rugby sevens competition

2025 World Rugby Sevens Challenger Series
- Men's tour – Series V
- Hosts: South Africa; Poland
- Date: 1 March – 4 May 2025
- Nations: 12

The 2025 World Rugby Sevens Challenger Series for men's rugby sevens teams is the fifth season of the second-tier World Rugby Sevens Challenger Series that allows a promotion pathway to the top-level SVNS.

The men's challenger tour with 12 national teams competing and will be played at same venues as their men's counterparts in Cape Town and Kraków. The top four team gain entry to the 2025 Los Angeles 2024–25 SVNS core team qualifier.

== Teams ==
There are 12 men's national teams competing in the Challenger Series for 2024.

Date qualified	Means of qualification	Nation
27 October 2024	2024 Sudamérica Rugby Sevens	Chile
27 October 2024	2024 Sudamérica Rugby Sevens	Brazil
30 June 2024	2024 Rugby Europe Sevens Championship Series	Germany
30 June 2024	2024 Rugby Europe Sevens Championship Series	Portugal
30 June 2024	2024 Rugby Europe Sevens Championship Series	Georgia
24 November 2024	2024 RAN Sevens	Canada
7 July 2024	2024 Africa Men's Sevens	Uganda
7 July 2024	2024 Africa Men's Sevens	Madagascar
10 November 2024	2024 Asia Rugby Sevens Series	Hong Kong
10 November 2024	2024 Asia Rugby Sevens Series	Japan
8 December 2024	2024 Oceania Sevens Championship	Samoa
8 December 2024	2024 Oceania Sevens Championship	Tonga
Totals	6	12

== Schedule ==
The official schedule for the 2025 World Rugby Sevens Challenger Series is:

2025 Itinerary
Leg	City	Stadium	Dates	Winner
1	Cape Town	Cape Town Stadium	1–2 March	Chile
2	Cape Town	Cape Town Stadium	7–8 March	Portugal
3	Kraków	Henryk Reyman Municipal Stadium	11–12 April	Portugal

== Standings ==
2025 World Rugby Sevens Challenger – Men's Series IV
Pos.	Event Team	Cape Town	Cape Town	Kraków	Points total
1	Portugal	12	20	20	52
2	Germany	16	18	16	50
3	Canada	18	16	14	48
4	Samoa	14	12	18	44
5	Chile	20	8	10	38
6	Japan	6	14	8	28
7	Madagascar	10	4	12	26
8	Tonga	3	10	10	23
9	Uganda	8	2	-	10
10	Georgia	2	6	-	8
11	Hong Kong	4	3	-	7
12	Brazil	1	1	-	2

Legend
Green	Qualified for Core Team Qualifier
Light Green	Qualified for Final Stage

== Cape Town 1 ==
=== Pool stage ===
The first event of the series took place at Athlone Stadium in Cape Town, South Africa, between 1-2 March. Teams were split into 4 Pools of 3 teams, facing each other in a single round-robin. The highest ranked team of each pool would advance to the semi-finals for 1st-4th place. The second-ranked teams would compete for 5th-8th, and the last ranked teams in the pools would compete for 9th-12th.

==== Pool A ====
Team	P	W	D	L	PF	PA	PD	TF	BP	Pts
Germany	2	2	0	0	57	14	+43	9	0	6
Japan	2	1	0	1	35	45	–10	5	0	3
Georgia	2	0	0	2	19	52	–33	3	1	1

==== Pool B ====
Team	P	W	D	L	PF	PA	PD	TF	BP	Pts
Chile	2	2	0	0	43	36	+7	7	0	6
Portugal	2	1	0	1	36	36	0	6	1	4
Tonga	2	0	0	2	36	43	–7	6	2	2

==== Pool C ====
Team	P	W	D	L	PF	PA	PD	TF	BP	Pts
Samoa	2	2	0	0	51	31	+20	9	0	6
Uganda	2	1	0	1	41	46	-5	7	0	3
Brazil	2	0	0	2	28	43	–15	4	1	1

==== Pool D ====
Team	P	W	D	L	PF	PA	PD	TF	BP	Pts
Canada	2	2	0	0	59	12	+47	9	0	6
Madagascar	2	1	0	1	42	72	-30	6	0	3
Hong Kong	2	0	0	2	46	63	–17	8	0	0

=== Play-offs ===
==== 9th to 12th playoffs ====
9th place semifinals
Athlone Stadium, South Africa
Tonga	43
Brazil	7
Athlone Stadium, South Africa
Georgia	0
Hong Kong	29

9th place final
Athlone Stadium, South Africa
Tonga	19
Hong Kong	21
11th place final
Athlone Stadium, South Africa
Brazil	0
Georgia	34

==== 5th to 8th playoffs ====
5th place semifinals
Athlone Stadium, South Africa
Portugal	47
Uganda	5
Athlone Stadium, South Africa
Japan	26
Madagascar	28

5th place final
Athlone Stadium, South Africa
Portugal	22
Madagascar	19
7th place final
Athlone Stadium, South Africa
Uganda	17
Japan	7

==== Cup ====
Cup Semifinals
Athlone Stadium, South Africa
Chile	31
Samoa	14
Athlone Stadium, South Africa
Germany	19
Canada	24

Cup Final
Athlone Stadium, South Africa
Chile	33
Canada	7
3rd place final
Athlone Stadium, South Africa
Samoa	14
Germany	19

=== Final placings ===
Place	Team
1st place, gold medalist(s)	Chile
2nd place, silver medalist(s)	Canada
3rd place, bronze medalist(s)	Germany
4	Samoa
5	Portugal
6	Madagascar
7	Uganda
8	Japan
9	Hong Kong
10	Tonga
11	Georgia
12	Brazil

== Cape Town 2 ==
=== Pool stage ===
The second event of the series took place at Athlone Stadium in Cape Town, South Africa, between 7-8 March.

==== Pool A ====
Team	P	W	D	L	PF	PA	PD	TF	BP	Pts
Japan	2	2	0	0	36	32	+4	6	0	6
Chile	2	1	0	1	39	24	+15	7	1	4
Hong Kong	2	0	0	2	24	43	–19	4	1	1

==== Pool B ====
Team	P	W	D	L	PF	PA	PD	TF	BP	Pts
Canada	2	2	0	0	64	31	+33	10	0	6
Tonga	2	1	0	1	45	45	0	7	1	4
Uganda	2	0	0	2	26	59	–33	4	1	1

==== Pool C ====
Team	P	W	D	L	PF	PA	PD	TF	BP	Pts
Germany	2	2	0	0	49	26	+23	7	0	6
Georgia	2	1	0	1	41	40	+1	7	1	4
Madagascar	2	0	0	2	31	55	–24	5	0	0

==== Pool D ====
Team	P	W	D	L	PF	PA	PD	TF	BP	Pts
Portugal	2	2	0	0	55	12	+43	9	0	6
Samoa	2	1	0	1	52	33	+19	8	1	4
Brazil	2	0	0	2	14	76	–62	2	0	0

=== Play-offs ===
==== 9th to 12th playoffs ====
9th place semifinals
Athlone Stadium, South Africa
Uganda	17
Madagascar	33
Athlone Stadium, South Africa
Hong Kong	24
Brazil	19

9th place final
Athlone Stadium, South Africa
Madagascar	24
Hong Kong	10
11th place final
Athlone Stadium, South Africa
Uganda	36
Brazil	12

==== 5th to 8th playoffs ====
5th place semifinals
Athlone Stadium, South Africa
Tonga	26
Georgia	12
Athlone Stadium, South Africa
Chile	19
Samoa	24

5th place final
Athlone Stadium, South Africa
Tonga	14
Samoa	35
7th place final
Athlone Stadium, South Africa
Georgia	5
Chile	15

==== Cup ====
Cup Semifinals
Athlone Stadium, South Africa
Canada	14
Germany	24
Athlone Stadium, South Africa
Japan	14
Portugal	36

Cup Final
Athlone Stadium, South Africa
Germany	7
Portugal	12
3rd place final
Athlone Stadium, South Africa
Canada	28
Japan	15

=== Final placings ===
Place	Team
1st place, gold medalist(s)	Portugal
2nd place, silver medalist(s)	Germany
3rd place, bronze medalist(s)	Canada
4	Japan
5	Samoa
6	Tonga
7	Chile
8	Georgia
9	Madagascar
10	Hong Kong
11	Uganda
12	Brazil

== Kraków ==
=== Pool stage ===
The third event of the series will take place in Kraków, Poland.

The top eight placed men's teams will progress to the third round in Kraków.

The four men's teams with the most cumulative points gained across the three Challenger rounds will then qualify for the SVNS Play Off in Los Angeles on 3 – 4 May.

== See also ==
- 2025 World Rugby Sevens Challenger Series – Women's tour
