= 2022 Africa Men's Sevens =

- Hosts: Uganda
- Date: 23–24 April 2022
- Nations: 14

Final positions
- Champions: Uganda
- Runners-up: Zimbabwe
- Third: Kenya

Series details
- Matches played: 30

The 2022 Africa Men's Sevens are an annual African rugby sevens tournament that took place at the Kyadondo Rugby Club, Kampala between 23 and 24 April 2022; they were held in Uganda for the second time. The top three teams qualified for the 2022 Rugby World Cup Sevens in Cape Town, and the top two teams qualified to the 2022 World Rugby Sevens Challenger Series. In addition, the top two Commonwealth teams not already qualified for the 2022 Commonwealth Games via the World Rugby Sevens Series booked their places in Birmingham.

Fourteen teams participated in the tournament, including 2019 champions Kenya.

== Format ==
Teams are seeded according to their performances in the previous championship and regional qualifiers. First-round results determine whether they advance to the Cup pools (for the top eight teams) or the Trophy pools (for the other six teams).

In the Cup competition, the top two teams in each pool advance to the semi-finals (and final / third-place match thereafter). The third-placed teams in each pool contest a fifth-place match, with all other teams (including those in the Trophy competition) given a final ranking after the pool stage since the competition was delayed by inclement weather on the morning of the second day.

== Teams ==
The following teams participated in the tournament, seeded as follows:

1. Kenya
2. Uganda
3. Namibia
4. Madagascar
5. Zimbabwe
6. Zambia
7. Tunisia
8. Mauritius
9. Cameroon
10. Burkina Faso
11. Botswana
12. Ghana
13. Burundi
14. Senegal

== Tournament play ==
All times in East Africa Time (UTC+03:00)

=== Opening round ===
23 April 2022	Kenya	19–0	Senegal	Kyadondo Rugby Club
8:00

23 April 2022	Uganda	71–0	Burundi	Kyadondo Rugby Club
8:22

23 April 2022	Namibia	19–10	Ghana	Kyadondo Rugby Club
8:44

23 April 2022	Madagascar	52–0	Botswana	Kyadondo Rugby Club
9:06

23 April 2022	Zimbabwe	12–14	Burkina Faso	Kyadondo Rugby Club
9:28

23 April 2022	Zambia	33–7	Cameroon	Kyadondo Rugby Club
9:50

23 April 2022	Tunisia	14–7	Mauritius	Kyadondo Rugby Club
10:12

The teams were allocated to pools according to the above results:

- Pool A: Winners of matches 1, 4, and 5, and the losing team with the smallest losing margin
- Pool B: Winners of matches 2, 3, 6, and 7
- Pool C: The losing teams with the 2nd, 5th, and 6th smallest losing margins
- Pool D: The losing teams with the 3rd, 4th, and 7th smallest losing margins

=== Pool stage ===
Legend (Cup matches only)
Advanced to semi-finals
Advanced to fifth-place match

Pool A (Cup)

Team	Pld	W	D	L	PF	PA	PD	Pts
Zimbabwe	3	2	0	1	86	41	+45	7
Kenya	3	2	0	1	64	38	+26	7
Madagascar	3	2	0	1	53	47	+6	7
Namibia	3	0	0	3	24	101	-77	3

23 April 2022	Madagascar	41–0	Namibia	Kyadondo Rugby Club
13:18

23 April 2022	Kenya	24–19	Zimbabwe	Kyadondo Rugby Club
13:40

23 April 2022	Madagascar	0–40	Zimbabwe	Kyadondo Rugby Club

23 April 2022	Kenya	33–7	Namibia	Kyadondo Rugby Club

24 April 2022	Namibia	17–27	Zimbabwe	Kyadondo Rugby Club
9:44

24 April 2022	Kenya	7–12	Madagascar	Kyadondo Rugby Club
10:06

Pool B (Cup)

Team	Pld	W	D	L	PF	PA	PD	Pts
Uganda	3	3	0	0	119	7	+112	9
Zambia	3	2	0	1	47	55	-8	7
Tunisia	3	1	0	2	17	48	-31	5
Burkina Faso	3	0	0	3	17	90	-73	3

23 April 2022	Burkina Faso	10–28	Zambia	Kyadondo Rugby Club
14:02

23 April 2022	Uganda	29–0	Tunisia	Kyadondo Rugby Club
14:24

23 April 2022	Burkina Faso	7–12	Tunisia	Kyadondo Rugby Club

23 April 2022	Uganda	40–7	Zambia	Kyadondo Rugby Club

24 April 2022	Zambia	12–5	Tunisia	Kyadondo Rugby Club
10:28

24 April 2022	Uganda	50–0	Burkina Faso	Kyadondo Rugby Club
10:50

Pool C (Trophy)

Team	Pld	W	D	L	PF	PA	PD	Pts
Mauritius	2	2	0	0	47	19	+28	6
Botswana	2	1	0	1	24	41	-17	4
Cameroon	2	0	0	2	27	38	-11	2

23 April 2022	Mauritius	26–7	Botswana	Kyadondo Rugby Club
12:34

23 April 2022	Cameroon	15–17	Botswana	Kyadondo Rugby Club

24 April 2022	Mauritius	21–12	Cameroon	Kyadondo Rugby Club
9:00

Pool D (Trophy)

Team	Pld	W	D	L	PF	PA	PD	Pts
Ghana	2	2	0	0	57	0	+57	6
Senegal	2	1	0	1	40	10	+30	4
Burundi	2	0	0	2	0	87	-87	2

23 April 2022	Ghana	47–0	Burundi	Kyadondo Rugby Club
12:56

23 April 2022	Senegal	40–0	Burundi	Kyadondo Rugby Club

24 April 2022	Ghana	10–0	Senegal	Kyadondo Rugby Club
9:22

=== Knockout stage (Cup only) ===
Semi-finals
24 April 2022 – Kyadondo Rugby Club
Zimbabwe	26
Zambia	17
24 April 2022 – Kyadondo Rugby Club
Uganda	22
Kenya	12

Final
24 April 2022 – Kyadondo Rugby Club
Zimbabwe	0
Uganda	28
Third place
24 April 2022 – Kyadondo Rugby Club
Zambia	12
Kenya	19

Semi-finals

24 April 2022	Zimbabwe	26–17	Zambia	Kyadondo Rugby Club
15:28

24 April 2022	Uganda	22–12	Kenya	Kyadondo Rugby Club
15:50

Fifth-place match

24 April 2022	Madagascar	19–7	Tunisia	Kyadondo Rugby Club

Third-place match

24 April 2022	Zambia	12–19	Kenya	Kyadondo Rugby Club

Final

24 April 2022	Zimbabwe	0–28	Uganda	Kyadondo Rugby Club
17:34

== Final standings ==
Legend
Green fill	Qualified for the 2022 Rugby World Cup Sevens
Blue bar	Qualified for the 2022 Commonwealth Games

Pos	Team
1	Uganda
2	Zimbabwe
3	Kenya (Note: Already qualified for the 2022 Commonwealth Games via the 2018–19 / 2019–20 World Rugby Sevens Series.)
4	Zambia
5	Madagascar
6	Tunisia
7	Burkina Faso
8	Namibia
9	Mauritius
10	Ghana
11	Senegal
12	Botswana
13	Cameroon
14	Burundi

== See also ==
- 2021–22 World Rugby Sevens Series
