= 2013 Rugby World Cup Sevens qualifying – Men =

This was the qualifications process of the men's teams for the 2013 Rugby World Cup Sevens, aimed at selecting the men's Rugby sevens national teams, which appeared in the finals in Moscow.

== General ==
The tournament organized by the IRB World Cup was held in Moscow on 28–30 June 2013, with the attendance of twenty-four team. Automatic qualification to the final tournament hosts and quarter-received previous World Cup. The remaining seats were held in elimination tournaments.

== Qualified teams ==
Africa	North America / Caribbean	South America	Europe	Asia	Oceania
Automatic qualification
Kenya; South Africa		Argentina	England; Russia; Wales		Fiji; New Zealand; Samoa
Regional Qualifiers
Zimbabwe; Tunisia	Canada; United States	Uruguay	Portugal; Spain; France; Georgia; Scotland	Japan; Hong Kong; Philippines	Australia; Tonga

== Qualifying ==
=== Africa ===
With two spots at the tournament at stake, which was also an Africa Sevens Championship, which took place on 29–30 September 2012 in Morocco in Rabat, there were two places in the finals of the World Cup. Eight teams were divided into two groups of four competed on the first day Round-robin, while in the second phase took place in the play-off.. In the absence of automatic promotion with South Africa and Kenya met in the final of the representations Zimbabwe and Tunisia. In a direct duel turned out to be a better team Zimbabwe, and both teams gained promotion to the World Cup.

=== North America / Caribbean ===
The qualifying Tournament, which is also NACRA Sevens, took place at the Twin Elm Rugby Park in Ottawa, 25–26 August 2012. The tournament was attended by eleven teams. On the first day they were fighting round-robin in three groups - two groups had four teams while one only having three, All the teams bar the weakest teams from each group advanced to the quarterfinals. The rate matches the phase play-off in the second day of the competition, there were two places in the finals of the World Cup. The favored teams Canada and USA met in the finals to thereby advance to the World Cup, and better in the direct duel turned out to Canadians.

=== South America ===
The qualifying Tournament, which is also CONSUR Sevens, took place at the Estádio da Gávea in Rio de Janeiro, 23–24 February 2013. The tournament was attended by ten representation teams divided into two groups that competed in the first phase round-robin. Top two from each group in the second phase of the re-formed group fighting for the medals round-robin and one place to promotion to the World Cup. Having been provided with automatic classification of Argentina won the contest, so the South American place in the finals of the World Cup was Uruguay.

=== Asia ===
In the match played in Singapore on 2–3 November 2012, the event was attended by twelve teams seeded according to the results achieved in the continental championship. On the first day, the teams competed round-robin, four groups of three teams played on the same day, as well as the quarter-finals, of which the top three were rewarded with a qualification to the World Cup. Japan, Hong Kong and Philippines teams qualified.

=== Europe ===
In the match played on July 20–21, 2012 at the Estádio Algarve tournament was attended by twelve teams. The nine teams that participated in the 2012 Grand Prix Series, not so far gained promotion to the World Cup, joined the top three teams A Division Tournament Championship 2012, which was held in Warsaw in May 2012. The first day of the game took place in round-robin in three groups, then ranked team on results. The top eight, being the first two teams from each group and the two best third-placed - advanced to the stage play-off. In games played on the second day of the competition matches the rate was five places in the finals 2013 World Cup - gained them the tournament Cup semi-finalists and the winner of the Plate, were appropriate representation of Portugal, Spain, France, Georgia and Scotland.

=== Oceania ===
The Oceania Championships, which is the qualifying tournament, held on 25–26 August 2012 in North Sydney Oval in Sydney. Two groups of four competed on the first day round-robin, while in the second phase took place in the play-off, the rate of addition to medals of the event were two places in the finals 2013 World Cup, a team that fought all outside having already achieved promotion Samoa, Fiji, New Zealand. The favorites for the race were the Australia and representatives of Samoa, who had no problems beating their opponents on the way to a decisive match. In the final, while the winners turned out to be the tournament host and participate in the World Cup finals in addition to their secured the third-place winner of the contest - Tonga.
