= 2017 Africa Cup Sevens =

- Hosts: Uganda
- Date: 6–7 October
- Nations: 10

Final positions
- Champions: Uganda
- Runners-up: Zimbabwe
- Third: Madagascar

The 2017 Africa Cup Sevens is a rugby sevens tournament held in Kampala, Uganda on 6–7 October 2017. It will be the 5th championship in a series that began in 2013.

The 2017 tournament serves as a qualifier for the following:

- The 2018 Hong Kong Sevens qualifier tournament, where two teams compete for a chance to be a core team of the 2018–19 World Rugby Sevens Series
- The 2018 Rugby World Cup Sevens, also involving the top two
- The 2018 Commonwealth Games, with the top two Commonwealth of Nations members eligible.

== Teams ==
- Botswana
- Ghana (Note: Ghana makes its tournament debut after being a full World Rugby member in May 2017)
- Madagascar
- Mauritius (Note: Namibia was originally scheduled to attend, but with Namibia Rugby Union citing financial reasons for pulling the team for the tournament, Mauritius was invited in its place)
- Morocco
- Senegal
- Tunisia
- Uganda
- Zambia
- Zimbabwe
- Notes:

== Pool stage ==
All matches are East Africa Time (UTC+3:00)

Legend
Advanced to cup quarterfinals

=== Pool A ===
Teams	Pld	W	D	L	PF	PA	+/−	Pts
Uganda	4	4	0	0	143	29	+114	12
Zambia	4	3	0	1	57	73	−16	10
Tunisia	4	1	1	2	71	87	−16	7
Morocco	4	1	0	3	69	95	−26	6
Ghana	4	0	1	3	34	90	−56	5

6 October 2017
9:30

Tunisia	19−19	Ghana

6 October 2017
9:52

Morocco	19−24	Zambia

6 October 2017
10:58

Uganda	33−0	Ghana

6 October 2017
11:20

Tunisia	14−21	Zambia

6 October 2017
12:48

Uganda	35−0	Zambia

6 October 2017
13:10

Tunisia	19−14	Morocco

6 October 2017
15:00

Uganda	42−10	Morocco

6 October 2017
15:22

Zambia	12−5	Ghana

6 October 2017
16:28

Uganda	33−19	Tunisia

6 October 2017
16:50

Morocco	26−10	Ghana

=== Pool B ===
Teams	Pld	W	D	L	PF	PA	+/−	Pts
Madagascar	4	4	0	0	109	29	+80	12
Zimbabwe	4	3	0	1	71	38	+33	10
Senegal	4	2	0	2	53	62	−9	8
Botswana	4	0	1	3	40	83	−43	5
Mauritius	4	0	1	3	38	99	−61	5

6 October 2017
10:14

Zimbabwe	21−7	Mauritius

6 October 2017
10:36

Senegal	24−12	Botswana

6 October 2017
12:04

Madagascar	40−10	Mauritius

6 October 2017
12:26

Zimbabwe	21−7	Botswana

6 October 2017
13:54

Madagascar	24-7	Botswana

6 October 2017
14:16

Zimbabwe	17−5	Senegal

6 October 2017
15:44

Madagascar	26−0	Senegal

6 October 2017
16:06

Botswana	14−14	Mauritius

6 October 2017
17:12

Madagascar	19−12	Zimbabwe

6 October 2017
17:34

Senegal	24−7	Mauritius

== Knockout stage ==
=== 9th Place ===
6 October 2017
12:28

Ghana	7−12	Mauritius

6 October 2017
14:48

Ghana	26−0	Mauritius

=== Cup ===
Quarter-finals
7 October 2017 - 11:00
Uganda	33
Botswana	0
7 October 2017 - 12:06
Zambia	33
Senegal	21
7 October 2017 - 11:22
Madagascar	33
Morocco	15
7 October 2017 - 11:44
Zimbabwe	17
Tunisia	12

Semi-finals
7 October 2017 - 14:04
Uganda	38
Zambia	12
7 October 2017 - 14:26
Madagascar	10
Zimbabwe	21

Final
7 October 2017 - 16:46
Uganda	10
Zimbabwe	7
Third place
7 October 2017 - 16:24
Zambia	7
Madagascar	26

=== 5th Place ===
Semi-finals
7 October 2017 - 13:20
Botswana	12
Senegal	27
7 October 2017 - 13:42
Morocco	10
Tunisia	14

Fifth Place
7 October 2017 - 16:02
Senegal	12
Tunisia	35
Seventh Place
7 October 2017 - 15:40
Botswana	0
Morocco	10

== Standings ==
Legend
Green fill	Qualified to 2018 Hong Kong Sevens and 2018 Rugby World Cup Sevens
Blue bar	Qualified to 2018 Commonwealth Games

Rank	Team
1st place, gold medalist(s)	Uganda
2nd place, silver medalist(s)	Zimbabwe
3rd place, bronze medalist(s)	Madagascar
4	Zambia
5	Tunisia
6	Senegal
7	Morocco
8	Botswana
9	Ghana
10	Mauritius

== See also ==
- 2018 Rugby World Cup Sevens qualifying – Men
- Rugby sevens at the 2018 Commonwealth Games
- 2017 Women's Africa Cup Sevens
