= Africa Women's Sevens =

African rugby sevens tournament

- Sport: Rugby sevens
- Instituted: 2004; 22 years ago
- Governing body: Africa (Rugby Africa)
- Holders: South Africa (2023)
- Most titles: South Africa (9 titles)

The Africa Women's Sevens is the continental championship for women's international rugby sevens in Africa. The tournament sanctioned and sponsored by Rugby Africa (previously CAR) which is the rugby union governing body for the continent.

== Tournament History ==
=== Background ===
Rugby sevens — also known as 7-a-side, or 7s — is a short form of the sport of rugby union that was first played in 1883. The first (men's) internationals took place in 1973. As women's rugby union developed in the 1960s and 1970s the format became very popular as it allowed games, and entire leagues, to be developed in countries even when player numbers were small, and it remains the main form the women's game is played in most parts of the world.

However, although the first women's international rugby union 15-a-side test match took place in 1982, it was not until 1997 before the first women's international 7s tournaments were played, when the 1997 Hong Kong Sevens included a women's tournament for the first time. Over the next decade the number of tournaments grew, with almost every region developing regular championship competitions. This reached its zenith with 2009's inaugural women's tournament for the Rugby World Cup Sevens, shortly followed by the announcement that women's rugby sevens will be included in the Olympics from 2016.

=== Beginnings ===
The 2004 CAR South Tournament took place in October. Rwanda and Burundi sent their national teams to play against clubs from Uganda (Thunderbirds A, B and C) and Kenya (Mwamba). The Thunderbirds from Uganda won the tournament.

The first official regional 7s championship for international women's teams from Africa was held in Tunisia in 2004, although this only included teams from Northern Africa. The first World Cup Sevens qualifier for women's teams from Africa was held in Uganda in 2008. Since then, African championships have periodically served as pre-qualifying competitions for the Rugby 7s World Cup, or other sevens tournaments such as at the Summer Olympics.

The 2005 CAR South Tournament was planned for Kampala, 5 to 6 November. The International Rugby Board (IRB) through the Confederation of African Rugby (CAR) offered 10,000 US dollars towards the first African women's rugby tournament to be held in Uganda. However CAR did not release the money as promised so it was called off. CAR released the money in 2006 for the first CAR 7s tournament where Uganda, Uganda Select, Kenya, South Africa, Rwanda, Burundi, Zambia and Zimbabwe participated. The 2006 CAR South Tournament was played in Uganda. The 2005 and 2006 CAR North Tournaments were played in Tunisia. Montpellier are known to have played in both.

There was an African Tournament that was supposed to have taken place in East London, South Africa on August 7 to 9, 2008 but was cancelled three weeks before the event. Likely teams were South Africa, England, Canada, France, Australia, USA, New Zealand, Samoa, Wales, Uganda, Rwanda, Kenya, Morocco, Zimbabwe, Tunisia and Zambia.

The 2009 CAR Women's Sevens was expected to take place on 25 and 26 September in Kampala, Uganda, but was cancelled due to a lack of sponsorship.

== Honours ==
Winners of continent-wide African Championship tournaments for national women's sevens teams:*

Year	Host	Final			Third place match			Refs
Year	Host	Winner	Score	Runner-up	Third	Score	Fourth	Refs
CAR Women's Sevens
2006	Kampala, Uganda	South Africa	15–7	Uganda	Kenya	No third place	Rwanda	
2007	Kampala, Uganda	South Africa	20–7	Uganda	Kenya	No third place	Tunisia	
2008	Kampala, Uganda	South Africa	24–0	Uganda	Kenya	15–14	Tunisia	
2012	Rabat, Morocco	Tunisia	14–10	Kenya	Uganda	12–5	Senegal	
2013	Tunis, Tunisia	South Africa	29–5	Tunisia	Uganda	12–0	Kenya	
2014	Machakos, Kenya	South Africa	15–0	Kenya	Tunisia	31–0	Zimbabwe	
Women's Africa Cup Sevens
2015	Kempton Park, South Africa	South Africa	31–5	Kenya	Tunisia	33–0	Zimbabwe	
2016	Harare, Zimbabwe	South Africa	22–17	Kenya	Zimbabwe	24–10	Uganda	
2017	Monastir, Tunisia	South Africa	17–12	Kenya	Tunisia	14–5	Uganda	
Africa Women's Sevens
2018	Gaborone, Botswana	Kenya	29–7	Uganda	Tunisia	22–7	Madagascar	
2019	Monastir, Tunisia	South Africa	15–14	Kenya	Madagascar	5–0	Tunisia	
2020	Canceled due to the COVID-19 pandemic in Africa							
2021	Canceled due to the COVID-19 pandemic in Africa							
2022	Jemmal, Tunisia	South Africa	15–14	Madagascar	Tunisia	17–15	Uganda	
2023	Monastir, Tunisia	South Africa	12–7	Kenya	Uganda	29–10	Zambia	
2024	Accra, Ghana	South Africa	17–10	Kenya	Uganda	17–5	Madagascar	
2025	Nairobi, Kenya	South Africa	22–0	Kenya	Uganda	38–12	Madagascar	
2026	Nairobi, Kenya	Uganda	33–0	Tunisia	Kenya	27–7	Zimbabwe	

Note

- Does not include regional competitions for Northern or Southern Africa, or tournaments including developmental sides or non-national teams.
- The following are details of all regional women's international championships played in Africa, listed chronologically with the earliest first, with all result details, where known (included are the CAR Women's Sevens and other official regional championships, e.g. CAR North and South tournaments).

== Team Records ==
Team	Champions	Runners-up	Third	Fourth	Losing semifinals
South Africa	13 (2006, 2007, 2008, 2013, 2014, 2015, 2016, 2017, 2019, 2022, 2023, 2024, 2025)	–	–	–	–
Kenya	1 (2018)	9 (2012, 2014, 2015, 2016, 2017, 2019, 2023, 2024, 2025)	2 (2008, 2026)	1 (2013)	2 (2006, 2007)
Uganda	1 (2026)	4 (2006, 2007, 2008, 2018)	4 (2012, 2013, 2023, 2024, 2025)	3 (2016, 2017, 2022)	–
Tunisia	1 (2012)	2 (2013, 2026)	4 (2014, 2015, 2017, 2022)	2 (2008, 2019)	1 (2007)
Madagascar	–	1 (2022)	1 (2019)	3 (2018, 2024, 2025)	–
Zimbabwe	–	–	1 (2016)	2 (2014, 2015)	–
Senegal	–	–	–	1 (2012)	–
Zambia	–	–	–	2 (2023, 2026)	–
Rwanda	–	–	–	–	1 (2006)

Years styled in italics when the associated team competed on home soil.

== CAR Regional Tournaments ==
=== 2004 CAR North Tournament ===
The competition was played in Tunisia.

==== Group stage ====
Group A

Team	Won	Drawn	Lost	For	Against
Tunisia	2	0	0	56	17
(France) Béziers	1	0	1	44	27
Malta	0	0	2	10	66

- Tunisia 22-12 Béziers
- Béziers 32-5 Malta
- Tunisia 34-5 Malta

Group B

Team	Won	Drawn	Lost	For	Against
(France) Montpellier	2	0	0	27	5
Tunisia Universities	1	0	1	10	20
Portugal	0	0	2	10	22

- Montpellier 12-5 Portugal
- Tunisia Universities 0-15 Montpellier
- Tunisia Universities 10-5 Portugal

==== Classification stage ====
Semi-finals

Semi-finals
Tunisia	24
Tunisia Universities	0
(France) Montpellier	7
(France) Béziers	5

Cup Final
Tunisia	17
(France) Montpellier	5
3rd Place
Tunisia Universities	Won
(France) Béziers	0

5th/6th Place

5th Place
Portugal	29
Malta	0

=== 2007 CAR North Tournament ===
Date/Venue: Tunis, Tunisia, 9–10 March 2007.

Table

Rank	Teams	P	W	D	L	PF	PA	PD
1st place, gold medalist(s)	Tunisia	4	3	1	0	63	10	+53
2nd place, silver medalist(s)	Uganda	4	3	1	0	49	15	+34
3rd place, bronze medalist(s)	(Cooperation Council for the Arab States of the Gulf) Arabian Gulf	4	1	1	2	15	27	–12
4	(Tunisia) Tunisian Universities	4	1	1	2	10	27	–17
5	Ivory Coast	4	0	0	4	0	58	–58

Matches

- Tunisia 5–0 Arabian Gulf
- Uganda 22–0 Ivory Coast
- Tunisian Universities 5–5 Arabian Gulf
- Tunisia 36–0 Ivory Coast
- Uganda 5–0 Tunisian Universities
- Tunisia 17–5 Tunisian Universities
- Uganda 17–10 Arabian Gulf
- Arabian Gulf beat Ivory Coast
- Tunisian Universities beat Ivory Coast
- Uganda 5–5 Tunisia

=== 2009 CAR North West ===
Venue/Date: 6–7 June 2009, Accra, Ghana. Ivory Coast were invited but did not attend.

==== Pool stages ====
Pool A Ghana, Burkina Faso, Tunisia

- Tunisia 34-0 Ghana
- Tunisia bt Burkina Faso
- Ghana bt Burkina Faso

Pool B Nigeria, Egypt, Togo, Morocco

- Nigeria 5-5 Morocco
- Nigeria 43-5 Togo
- Nigeria 66-0 Egypt

==== Classification stages ====
- 5th Burkina Faso, 6th Togo, 7th Egypt

Semi-finals

- Nigeria 17-0 Ghana
- Tunisia 47-0 Morocco

3rd Place

- Ghana 5-0 Morocco

Final

- Tunisia 43-5 Nigeria

=== 2010 CAR North West ===
The tournament was held on 28 and 29 May in Ouagadougou, Burkina Faso. Mali withdrew and were replaced by hosts, Burkina Faso.

POOL A

Nation	Won	Drawn	Lost	For	Against
Senegal	2	1	0	?	?
Morocco	2	0	1	64	10
Ghana	1	1	1	?	?
Togo	0	0	3	?	?

- Morocco 29-0 Togo
- Morocco 28-0 Ghana
- Senegal 10-7 Morocco
- Senegal 5-5 Ghana
- Senegal beat Togo
- Ghana beat Togo

Semi-finals

- Senegal 7-0 Burkina Faso
- Tunisia 43-0 Morocco

Consolation semifinals

- Ivory Coast beat Togo
- Ghana beat Burkina Faso B

7th place final

- Togo beat Burkina Faso B

POOL B

Nation	Won	Drawn	Lost	For	Against
Tunisia	3	0	0	118	0
Burkina Faso A	2	0	1	?	?
Ivory Coast	1	0	2	?	?
Burkina Faso B	0	0	3	?	?

- Burkina Faso A 0-41 Tunisia
- Ivory Coast A 0-40 Tunisia
- Burkina Faso beat Ivory Coast
- Burkina Faso B 0-37 Tunisia
- Burkina Faso A beat Burkina Faso B
- Burkina Faso B lost to Ivory Coast

5th place final

- Ivory Coast beat Ghana

3rd place final

- Morocco 12-0 Burkina Faso

Final

- Tunisia 50-0 Senegal

== See also ==
- Africa Men's Sevens
