= 2018 Africa Men's Sevens =

Rugby competition in Tunisia

- Hosts: Tunisia
- Date: 13–14 October
- Nations: 12

Final positions
- Champions: Zimbabwe
- Runners-up: Kenya
- Third: Uganda

The 2018 Africa Men's Sevens was a rugby sevens tournament held in Monastir, Tunisia on 13–14 October 2018. It was the 6th championship in a series that began in 2013.

== Pool stage ==
Legend
Advances to cup playoff
Advances to 9th Place Playoff

=== Pool A ===
Teams	Pld	W	D	L	PF	PA	+/−	Pts
Kenya	2	2	0	0	90	0	+90	6
Morocco	2	1	0	1	24	41	-17	3
Botswana	2	0	0	2	0	73	-73	0

13 October 2018
11:00

Kenya	49−0	Botswana

13 October 2018
12:15

Morocco	24−0	Botswana

13 October 2018
14:40

Kenya	41−0	Morocco

=== Pool B ===
Teams	Pld	W	D	L	PF	PA	+/−	Pts
Uganda	2	2	0	0	76	0	+76	6
Senegal	2	1	0	1	24	43	-19	3
Ghana	2	0	0	2	12	69	-57	0

13 October 2018
11:22

Uganda	45−0	Ghana

13 October 2018
13:12

Senegal	24−12	Ghana

13 October 2018
15:02

Uganda	31−0	Senegal

=== Pool C ===
Teams	Pld	W	D	L	PF	PA	+/−	Pts
Zimbabwe	2	2	0	0	60	6	+55	6
Tunisia	2	1	0	1	36	36	0	3
Mauritius	2	0	0	0	10	65	-55	0

13 October 2018
11:44

Zimbabwe	34−0	Mauritius

13 October 2018
13:34

Tunisia	31−10	Mauritius

13 October 2018
15:24

Zimbabwe	26−5	Tunisia

=== Pool D ===
Teams	Pld	W	D	L	PF	PA	+/−	Pts
Madagascar	2	2	0	0	43	31	+12	6
Zambia	2	1	0	1	40	26	+14	3
Namibia	2	0	0	2	26	52	-26	0

13 October 2018
12:06

Madagascar	24−19	Namibia

13 October 2018
13:56

Zambia	28−7	Namibia

13 October 2018
15:46

Madagascar	19−12	Zambia

== Knockout stage ==
=== Cup ===
Quarter-finals
14 October 2018 10:00
Kenya	33
Zambia	7
14 October 2018 11:08
Madagascar	33
Morocco	10
14 October 2018 10:22
Uganda	14
Tunisia	10
14 October 2018 10:44
Zimbabwe	19
Senegal	0

Semi-finals
14 October 2018 12:58
Kenya	36
Madagascar	5
14 October 2018 13:20
Uganda	19
Zimbabwe	24

Final
14 October 2018 15:52
Kenya	5
Zimbabwe	17
Third place
14 October 2018 15:30
Madagascar	19
Uganda	24

=== Plate ===
Semi-finals
14 October 2018 - 12:14
Zambia	42
Morocco	14
14 October 2018 - 12:36
Tunisia	12
Senegal	7

Plate Final
14 October 2018 - 15:08
Zambia	24
Tunisia	14
Seventh Place
14 October 2018 - 14:46
Morocco	24
Senegal	26

=== 9th Place ===
Semi-finals
14 October 2018 - 11:30
Namibia	14
Botswana	0
14 October 2018 - 11:52
Ghana	40
Mauritius	0

Ninth Place
14 October 2018 - 14:24
Namibia	24
Ghana	14
12th Place
14 October 2018 - 14:02
Botswana	12
Mauritius	0

== Standings ==
Legend
Qualified to 2019 Hong Kong Sevens
Already a core team

Rank	Team
1st place, gold medalist(s)	Zimbabwe
2nd place, silver medalist(s)	Kenya
3rd place, bronze medalist(s)	Uganda
4	Madagascar
5	Zambia
6	Tunisia
7	Senegal
8	Morocco
9	Namibia
10	Ghana
11	Botswana
12	Mauritius
