= Kyadondo Rugby Club =

Rugby union ground in Kampala, Uganda

Coordinates: 0°19′30″N 32°36′25″E

Kyadondo Rugby Club is a rugby union ground in Kampala, Uganda.

Kyadondo Rugby Club was officially opened in 2000 and has since become a major hub for Ugandan rugby, home to several prominent teams and a center for community and international events. Facilities include the main ground, a training pitch and a club house.

The ground is home to several club teams, among them Heathens RFC, a leading rugby club in Uganda. The venue has also hosted home games of the Uganda national rugby union team, but the Uganda Rugby Union is considering hosting games at the National Stadium or Nakivubo Stadium due to limited capacity of Kyadondo.

The club has also been a concert venue, witnessing performers such as Beenie Man.

== History ==
=== July 2010 Kampala attacks ===
Kyadondo Rugby Club was one of the two scenes of the July 2010 Kampala attacks carried out against crowds watching a screening of the 2010 FIFA World Cup Final. The second attack, consisting of two explosions in quick succession, occurred at 11:18 pm at Kyadondo Rugby Club, where state-run newspaper New Vision was hosting a screening of the match. According to eyewitnesses, there was an explosion near the 90th minute of the match, followed seconds later by a second explosion that knocked out the lights at the field. An explosion went off directly in front of a large screen that was showing the telecast from South Africa, killing 49 people. The discovery of a severed head and leg at the rugby field suggests that it was a suicide attack carried out by an individual. A third unexploded vest was later found.

=== Founding and early years (1999–2000s) ===
The club was built and officially opened in 1999–2000 to provide a dedicated rugby ground in Kampala. It quickly grew to host numerous games, training sessions, and social events, becoming a significant symbol of the sport in Uganda.

=== Home to top teams and development programs ===
Kyadondo rugby community is a home to six competitive Rugby Teams for example Heathens, Buffaloes, Thunderbirds(women's senior team), Stallions, Bisons and Peacocks a Rugby Academy, Totos Rugby to the Wazee Rugby. The club has a strong focus on nurturing new talent through programs like the Kyadondo Rugby Academy, Totos Rugby (under 12s), and the Wazee Rugby (over 35s), often collaborating with initiatives like the Tag Rugby Trust.

=== Resilience and growth ===
Following the attacks, the club demonstrated resilience, recovering to continue hosting major shows and events. It has hosted home games for the Uganda national rugby union team and major tournaments like the Kyadondo 7s circuit, which the Thunderbirds women's team made history by hosting in 2024.

== See also ==
- Arua Hill Park
- Entebbe Cricket Oval
