= 2009 Rugby World Cup Sevens – Men's tournament =

Tournament details
- Venue: The Sevens
- Dates: 5 – 7 March
- No. of nations: 24

Final positions
- Champions: Wales
- Runner-up: Argentina

Tournament statistics
- Matches played: 57

The men's tournament in the 2009 Rugby World Cup Sevens was held at The Sevens in Dubai alongside the inaugural women's tournament. The tournament was held from 5 March to 7 March, with Wales beating Argentina 19−12 at the final.

== Teams ==
24 Teams took part in this tournament

- (Cooperation Council for the Arab States of the Gulf) Arabian Gulf (host)
- Argentina
- Australia
- Canada
- England
- Fiji (holders)
- France
- Georgia
- Hong Kong
- Ireland
- Italy
- Japan
- Kenya
- New Zealand
- Portugal
- Samoa
- Scotland
- South Africa
- Tonga
- Tunisia
- United States
- Uruguay
- Wales
- Zimbabwe

== Pool Stages ==
Legend
Teams advanced to the Cup quarter-final
Teams advanced to the Plate quarter-final
Teams advanced to the Bowl quarter-final

All times are local (UTC+4).

=== Pool A ===
Team	Pld	W	D	L	PF	PA	+/–	P
New Zealand	3	3	0	0	107	12	+95	9
Tonga	3	2	0	1	57	34	+23	7
Italy	3	1	0	2	29	90	–61	5
(Cooperation Council for the Arab States of the Gulf) Arabian Gulf	3	0	0	3	22	79	–57	3

5 March 2009
17:52

Tonga	19–0	(Cooperation Council for the Arab States of the Gulf) Arabian Gulf

5 March 2009
19:54

New Zealand	42–0	Italy

6 March 2009
11:00

New Zealand	41–5	(Cooperation Council for the Arab States of the Gulf) Arabian Gulf

6 March 2009
13:34

Tonga	31–10	Italy

6 March 2009
16:30

Arabian Gulf (Cooperation Council for the Arab States of the Gulf)	17–19	Italy

6 March 2009
19:28

New Zealand	24–7	Tonga

=== Pool B ===
Team	Pld	W	D	L	PF	PA	+/–	Pts
Fiji	3	3	0	0	90	27	+63	9
France	3	2	0	1	64	55	+9	7
United States	3	1	0	2	62	57	+5	5
Georgia	3	0	0	3	15	92	–77	3

5 March 2009
17:44

France	26–17	United States

5 March 2009
20:16

Fiji	26–10	Georgia

6 March 2009
12:50

Fiji	26–12	United States

6 March 2009
15:02

France	33–0	Georgia

6 March 2009
17:14

United States	33–5	Georgia

6 March 2009
18:20

Fiji	38–5	France

=== Pool C ===
Team	Pld	W	D	L	PF	PA	+/–	Pts
South Africa	3	3	0	0	60	26	+34	9
Canada	3	2	0	1	62	41	+21	7
Scotland	3	1	0	2	59	62	–3	5
Japan	3	0	0	3	27	79	–52	3

5 March 2009
17:32

Scotland	14–33	Canada

5 March 2009
20:38

South Africa	26–5	Japan

6 March 2009
12:06

South Africa	15–7	Canada

6 March 2009
14:18

Scotland	31–10	Japan

6 March 2009
15:46

Canada	22–12	Japan

6 March 2009
17:58

South Africa	19–14	Scotland

=== Pool D ===
Team	Pld	W	D	L	PF	PA	+/–	Pts
Samoa	3	3	0	0	74	12	+62	9
Australia	3	1	0	2	45	55	–10	5
Portugal	3	1	0	2	36	49	–13	5
Ireland	3	1	0	2	34	73	–39	5

5 March 2009
17:22

Australia	24–12	Portugal

5 March 2009
18:06

Samoa	35–5	Ireland
	Match Report

Dubai Sevens Stadium

6 March 2009
11:44

Samoa	20–7	Portugal

6 March 2009
14:40

Australia	21–24	Ireland
	Match Report

Dubai Sevens Stadium

6 March 2009
16:52

Portugal	17–5	Ireland
	Match Report

Dubai Sevens Stadium

6 March 2009
18:44

Samoa	19–0	Australia

Dubai Sevens Stadium

=== Pool E ===
Team	Pld	W	D	L	PF	PA	+/–	Pts
England	3	3	0	0	94	36	+58	9
Kenya	3	2	0	1	79	40	+39	7
Tunisia	3	1	0	2	48	69	–21	5
Hong Kong	3	0	0	3	26	102	–76	3

5 March 2009
17:10

Kenya	29–7	Tunisia

5 March 2009
19:30

England	42–5	Hong Kong

6 March 2009
11:22

England	26–24	Tunisia

6 March 2009
13:12

Kenya	43–7	Hong Kong

6 March 2009
16:08

Tunisia	17–14	Hong Kong

6 March 2009
19:06

England	26–7	Kenya

=== Pool F ===
Team	Pld	W	D	L	PF	PA	+/–	Pts
Argentina	3	3	0	0	73	12	+61	9
Wales	3	2	0	1	58	19	+39	7
Zimbabwe	3	1	0	2	38	95	–57	5
Uruguay	3	0	0	3	31	74	–43	3

5 March 2009
17:00

Wales	31–5	Zimbabwe

5 March 2009
18:16

Argentina	19–7	Uruguay

6 March 2009
12:28

Argentina	40–5	Zimbabwe

6 March 2009
13:56

Wales	27–0	Uruguay

6 March 2009
15:24

Zimbabwe	28–24	Uruguay

6 March 2009
17:36

Argentina	14–0	Wales

== Knockout ==
=== Bowl ===
Quarter-finals
7 March 2009 – 10:30
Zimbabwe	28
Georgia	10
7 March 2009 – 10:52
Uruguay	19
Japan	12
7 March 2009 – 11:14
Ireland	24
(Cooperation Council for the Arab States of the Gulf) Arabian Gulf	5
7 March 2009 – 11:36
Italy	7
Hong Kong	14

Semi-finals
7 March 2009 – 14:56
Zimbabwe	24
Uruguay	7
7 March 2009 – 15:18
Ireland	22
Hong Kong	15

Final
7 March 2009 – 18:30
Zimbabwe	17
Ireland	14

=== Plate ===
Quarter-finals
7 March 2009 – 11:58
Tonga	24
Tunisia	7
7 March 2009 – 12:20
Australia	24
United States	14
7 March 2009 – 12:42
France	19
Scotland	21
7 March 2009 – 13:06
Canada	5
Portugal	12

Semi-finals
7 March 2009 – 15:40
Tonga	19
Australia	22
7 March 2009 – 16:02
Scotland	29
Portugal	7

Final
7 March 2009 – 19:30
Australia	17
Scotland	21

=== Cup ===
Quarter-finals
7 March 2009 – 13:28
New Zealand	14
Wales	15
7 March 2009 – 13:50
Samoa	31
England	26
7 March 2009 – 14:12
Argentina	14
South Africa	12
7 March 2009 – 14:34
Fiji	7
Kenya	26

Semi-finals
7 March 2009 – 17:08
Wales	19
Samoa	12
7 March 2009 – 17:30
Argentina	12
Kenya	0

Final
7 March 2009 – 20:35
Wales	19
Argentina	12
