= 2013 Rugby World Cup Sevens – Men's tournament =

Tournament details
- Venue: Luzhniki Stadium
- Dates: 28 – 30 June
- No. of nations: 24

Final positions
- Champions: New Zealand
- Runner-up: England

Tournament statistics
- Matches played: 58
- Tries scored: 320 (average 5.52 per match)
- Top scorer(s): (Canada) Nathan Hirayama (49 points)

The men's tournament in the 2013 Rugby World Cup Sevens was held at Luzhniki stadium in Moscow. The tournament was held from 28 to 30 June, with New Zealand beating England 33−0 in the final.

== Teams ==
- Argentina
- Australia
- Canada
- England
- Fiji
- France
- Georgia
- Hong Kong
- Japan
- Kenya
- New Zealand
- Philippines
- Portugal
- Russia (Hosts)
- Samoa
- Scotland
- South Africa
- Spain
- Tonga
- Tunisia
- United States
- Uruguay
- Wales (Holders)
- Zimbabwe

== Draw ==
The band allocation was completed on February 25 in advance of the pool draw on February 28.

The 24 teams were ranked in four bands of six, determined by series points accumulated over the 2010/11 and 2011/12 HSBC Sevens World Series, and the first five rounds of the current 2012/13 Series.

The bands were:

Band 1	New Zealand, Fiji, South Africa, Samoa, England, Australia
Band 2	Wales, Argentina, France, Kenya, Scotland, United States
Band 3	Canada, Portugal, Spain, Russia, Tonga, Zimbabwe
Band 4	Japan, Hong Kong, Georgia, Tunisia, Philippines, Uruguay

== Pool Stage ==
Key to colours in group tables
Teams advanced to the Cup quarter-final
Teams advanced to the Plate quarter-final
Teams advanced to the Bowl quarter-final

All times are local (UTC+4).

=== Pool A ===
Teams	Pld	W	D	L	PF	PA	+/−	Pts
Australia	3	2	1	0	78	24	+54	8
France	3	2	1	0	62	41	+21	8
Tunisia	3	1	0	2	40	88	−48	5
Spain	3	0	0	3	41	68	−27	3

28 June 2013
18:30

Australia	21 – 0	Spain
	Report

Luzhniki Stadium

28 June 2013
18:52

France	24 – 7	Tunisia
	Report

Luzhniki Stadium

29 June 2013
11:56

Australia	40 – 7	Tunisia
	Report

Luzhniki Stadium

29 June 2013
12:18

France	21 – 17	Spain
	Report

Luzhniki Stadium

29 June 2013
14:52

Spain	24 – 26	Tunisia
	Report

Luzhniki Stadium

29 June 2013
18:10

Australia	17 – 17	France
	Report

Luzhniki Stadium

=== Pool B ===
Teams	Pld	W	D	L	PF	PA	+/−	Pts
South Africa	3	3	0	0	105	0	+105	9
Scotland	3	2	0	1	40	63	−23	7
Japan	3	0	1	2	29	64	−35	4
Russia	3	0	1	2	17	64	−47	4

28 June 2013
19:14

South Africa	31 – 0	Russia
	Report

Luzhniki Stadium

28 June 2013
19:36

Scotland	19 – 17	Japan
	Report

Luzhniki Stadium

29 June 2013
12:40

South Africa	33 – 0	Japan
	Report

Luzhniki Stadium

29 June 2013
13:02

Scotland	21 – 5	Russia
	Report

Luzhniki Stadium

29 June 2013
19:16

South Africa	41 – 0	Scotland
	Report

Luzhniki Stadium

29 June 2013
19:38

Russia	12 – 12	Japan
	Report

Luzhniki Stadium

=== Pool C ===
Teams	Pld	W	D	L	PF	PA	+/−	Pts
Kenya	3	3	0	0	93	22	+71	9
Samoa	3	2	0	1	62	31	+31	7
Zimbabwe	3	1	0	2	38	59	−21	5
Philippines	3	0	0	3	12	93	−81	3

28 June 2013
15:00

Samoa	21 – 14	Zimbabwe
	Report

Luzhniki Stadium

28 June 2013
15:22

Kenya	45 – 5	Philippines
	Report

Luzhniki Stadium

29 June 2013
09:00

Samoa	29 – 0	Philippines
	Report

Luzhniki Stadium

29 June 2013
09:22

Kenya	31 – 5	Zimbabwe
	Report

Luzhniki Stadium

29 June 2013
13:24

Zimbabwe	19 – 7	Philippines
	Report

Luzhniki Stadium

29 June 2013
15:14

Samoa	12 – 17	Kenya
	Report

Luzhniki Stadium

=== Pool D ===
Teams	Pld	W	D	L	PF	PA	+/−	Pts
New Zealand	3	3	0	0	83	38	+45	9
Canada	3	2	0	1	53	64	−11	7
United States	3	1	0	2	59	60	−1	5
Georgia	3	0	0	3	45	78	−33	3

28 June 2013
15:44

New Zealand	31 – 12	Canada
	Report

Luzhniki Stadium

28 June 2013
16:06

United States	26 – 19	Georgia
	Report

Luzhniki Stadium

29 June 2013
09:44

New Zealand	26 – 7	Georgia
	Report

Luzhniki Stadium

29 June 2013
10:06

United States	14 – 15	Canada
	Report

Luzhniki Stadium

29 June 2013
13:46

Canada	26 – 19	Georgia
	Report

Luzhniki Stadium

29 June 2013
16:20

New Zealand	26 – 19	United States
	Report

Luzhniki Stadium

=== Pool E ===
Teams	Pld	W	D	L	PF	PA	+/−	Pts
Wales	3	3	0	0	80	38	+42	9
Fiji	3	2	0	1	106	19	+87	7
Tonga	3	1	0	2	55	73	−18	5
Uruguay	3	0	0	3	5	116	−111	3

28 June 2013
16:28

Fiji	45 – 0	Tonga
	Report

Luzhniki Stadium

28 June 2013
16:50

Wales	33 – 5	Uruguay
	Report

Luzhniki Stadium

29 June 2013
10:28

Fiji	47 – 0	Uruguay
	Report

Luzhniki Stadium

29 June 2013
10:50

Wales	28 – 19	Tonga
	Report

Luzhniki Stadium

29 June 2013
14:08

Tonga	36 – 0	Uruguay
	Report

Luzhniki Stadium

29 June 2013
16:42

Fiji	14 – 19	Wales
	Report

Luzhniki Stadium

=== Pool F ===
Teams	Pld	W	D	L	PF	PA	+/−	Pts
England	3	3	0	0	73	26	+47	9
Argentina	3	1	0	2	69	38	+31	5
Portugal	3	1	0	2	38	48	−10	5
Hong Kong	3	1	0	2	31	99	−68	5

28 June 2013
17:12

England	21 – 7	Portugal
	Report

Luzhniki Stadium

28 June 2013
17:34

Argentina	47 – 7	Hong Kong
	Report

Luzhniki Stadium

29 June 2013
11:12

Argentina	10 – 17	Portugal
	Report

Luzhniki Stadium

29 June 2013
11:34

England	38 – 7	Hong Kong
	Report

Luzhniki Stadium

29 June 2013
14:30

Portugal	14 – 17	Hong Kong
	Report

Luzhniki Stadium

29 June 2013
17:48

England	14 – 12	Argentina
	Report

Luzhniki Stadium

== Knockout stage ==
=== Bowl ===
Quarter-finals
30 June 2013 – 09:30 – Luzhniki Stadium
Tunisia	7
Uruguay	12
30 June 2013 – 09:52 – Luzhniki Stadium
Russia	17
Spain	7
30 June 2013 – 10:14 – Luzhniki Stadium
Hong Kong	10
Georgia	31
30 June 2013 – 10:36 – Luzhniki Stadium
Japan	50
Philippines	0

Semi-finals
30 June 2013 – 14:28 – Luzhniki Stadium
Uruguay	0
Russia	38
30 June 2013 – 14:50 – Luzhniki Stadium
Georgia	21
Japan	24

Final
30 June 2013 – 18:15 – Luzhniki Stadium
Russia	29
Japan	5

=== Plate ===
Quarter-finals
30 June 2013 – 10:58 – Luzhniki Stadium
Samoa	26
Zimbabwe	17
30 June 2013 – 11:20 – Luzhniki Stadium
Argentina	28
United States	5
30 June 2013 – 11:42 – Luzhniki Stadium
Scotland	17
Portugal	0
30 June 2013 – 12:04 – Luzhniki Stadium
Canada	26
Tonga	0

Semi-finals
30 June 2013 – 15:12 – Luzhniki Stadium
Samoa	21
Argentina	14
30 June 2013 – 15:34 – Luzhniki Stadium
Scotland	7
Canada	21

Final
30 June 2013 – 19:05 – Luzhniki Stadium
Samoa	12
Canada	19

=== Cup ===
Quarter-finals
30 June 2013 – 13:00 – Luzhniki Stadium
South Africa	10
Fiji	12
30 June 2013 – 13:22 – Luzhniki Stadium
New Zealand	26
Wales	10
30 June 2013 – 13:44 – Luzhniki Stadium
England	21
Australia	17
30 June 2013 – 14:06 – Luzhniki Stadium
Kenya (aet)	24
France	19

Semi-finals
30 June 2013 – 16:40 – Luzhniki Stadium
Fiji	0
New Zealand	17
30 June 2013 – 17:02 – Luzhniki Stadium
England	12
Kenya	5

Final
30 June 2013 – 20:55 – Luzhniki Stadium
New Zealand	33
England	0
Third place
30 June 2013 – 19:55 – Luzhniki Stadium
Fiji	29
Kenya	5

2013 Rugby World Cup Sevens Men's winners

New Zealand
2nd title

== Leading Scorers ==
Tries scored
Rank	Player	Tries
1	Metuisela Talebula	7
2	Humphrey Kayange	6
3	Lio Lolo	5
3	Nathan Hirayama	5
3	Dan Norton	5
3	Shannon Walker	5

Points scored
Rank	Player	Points
1	Nathan Hirayama	49
2	Metuisela Talebula	43
3	Merab Kvirikashvili	38
4	Gillies Kaka	32
5	Javier Rojas Alvarez	32
5	Terry Bouhraoua	32
