= Zambia national rugby sevens team =

Zambia
- Full name: Zambia national rugby sevens team
- Union: Zambia Rugby Football Union
- Region: Africa
- Coach: Andrew Musonda Kaminsa
- Captain: Israel Kalumba

World Cup Sevens
- Appearances: 0

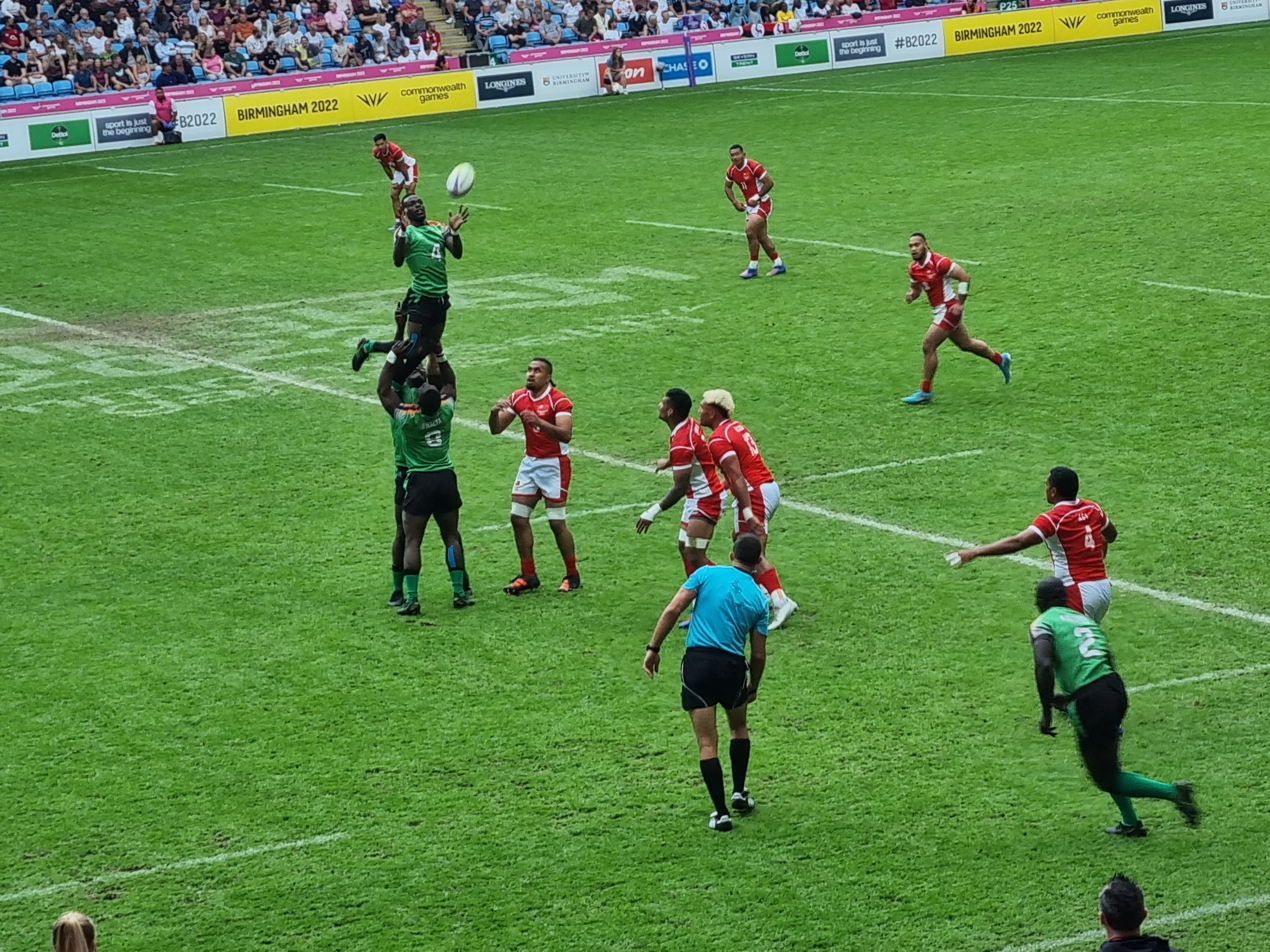
Zambia vs Tonga at the 2022 Commonwealth Games.

The Zambia national rugby sevens team is the men's African rugby sevens team that competes in the annual Africa Men's Sevens competition and the Commonwealth Games. It is governed by the Zambia Rugby Football Union (ZRFU).

The team reached their peak in 2003, when they participated on the World 7s series, drawing with the likes of Australia. However it is widely agreed with the talents of Hamayuma, Chimbuluku and Watkins the side is currently the strongest it has ever been.

== History ==
Zambia made their first Commonwealth Games rugby sevens appearance in 2018, and they qualified again in 2022. Their best result at the Africa sevens event was fourth (2017, 2022).

The squad competed in 2 events in 2022 - the Zambezi Challenge 7s coming as runners up, notably higher than both Botswana (8th) and Zimbabwe (3rd). They finished 4th in the 2022 Africa 7s held in Kampala, Uganda. They were very close to qualifying for the World Cup that year, losing to Zimbabwe by 7 points in the Semi-Final and to Kenya by 3 points in the Bronze Final.

The squad attended the 2023 Africa 7s, finishing in 4th place. Missing out on the Olympic Repecharge to Uganda. In 2024, the squad will attend the All-Africa Championship in Ghana.

== Players ==
Zambia's sevens squad to the 2022 Commonwealth Games.

- Head coach: Musonda Kaminsa

No.	Player	Date of birth (age)
1	Israel Kalumba (c)	12 December 1992 (aged 29)
2	Edmond Hamayuwa	14 October 1997 (aged 24)
3	Laston Mukosa	10 September 1992 (aged 29)
4	Davy Chimbukulu	1 June 1994 (aged 28)
5	Lawrence Kaushiku	10 May 1995 (aged 27)
6	Elisha Bwalya	15 July 1999 (aged 23)
7	Mike Masabo	19 January 1995 (aged 27)
8	Brian Mbalwe	8 December 1995 (aged 26)
9	Rodgers Mukupa	7 May 1993 (aged 29)
10	Alex Mwewa	25 November 1998 (aged 23)
11	Chisanga Nkoma	1 April 1995 (aged 27)
12	Arun Watkins	17 October 2001 (aged 20)
13	Melvin Banda	26 August 1998 (aged 23)

== Team records ==
=== Rugby World Cup Sevens ===
World Cup record
Year	Round	Position	Pld	W	L	D
1993	Did not qualify					
1997	Did not qualify					
2001	Did not qualify					
2005	Did not qualify					
2009	Did not qualify					
2013	Did not qualify					
2018	Did not qualify					
2022	Did not qualify					
Total	0/8					

=== Commonwealth Games ===
Commonwealth Games record
Year	Round	Position	P	W	L	D
1998	Did not qualify					
2002	Did not qualify					
2006	Did not qualify					
2010	Did not qualify					
2014	Did not qualify					
2018	Pool stage	16th	3	0	3	0
2022	13th–16th Place Semi-finals	=15th	5	0	5	0
Total	0 Titles	2/7	8	0	8	0
