= Tunisia national rugby sevens team =

Tunisia
- Union: Tunisian Rugby Federation
- Nickname(s): نسور قرطاج (Eagles of Carthage)
- Coach: Claude Saurel
Team kit	Change kit

World Cup Sevens
- Appearances: 3 (First in 2005)
- Best result: 13th place, 2005, 2009

The Tunisia national rugby sevens team competes in the World Sevens Series and Rugby World Cup Sevens. They have been competing on and off at the Hong Kong Sevens, since 1989, which was their first time there.

At the Sevens World Series, Tunisia has collected 19 wins, 63 losses and 2 ties. Their most recent wins were against Argentina and Arabian Gulf at Dubai 2006; Australia, Scotland and Samoa at South Africa 2006; and France at Hong Kong 2008. The team resulted sixth at South Africa 2006 and seventh at South Africa 2004. Their last appearance at a World Series tournament was South Africa 2009. Tunisia played at the 2013 Sevens World Series qualifier at Hong Kong, where they won over Uruguay and lost to Tonga at the quarterfinals.

== Tournament history ==
=== Rugby World Cup Sevens ===
World Cup record
Year	Round	Position	Pld	W	L	D
(Scotland) 1993	Did not qualify					
(Hong Kong) 1997	Did not qualify					
(Argentina) 2001	Did not qualify					
(Hong Kong) 2005	Plate Quarterfinalists	13th	6	3	3	0
(United Arab Emirates) 2009	Plate Quarterfinalists	13th	4	1	3	0
(Russia) 2013	Bowl Quarterfinalists	21st	4	1	3	0
(United States) 2018	Did not qualify					
(South Africa) 2022	tbd					
Total	0 Titles	3/7	14	5	9	0

== Africa Cup Record ==
Africa Cup record
Year	Round	P	W	D	L	F	A
2000							
2004							
2008							
2012							
2013							
2014							
2015							
2016							
2017							
2018							
2019							
Total	20/20						

== Players ==
=== Squad ===
Squad to the 2014 Hong Kong Sevens World Series Qualifier.

- Haithem Chelli
- Hossem Khalifa
- Mohsen Essid
- Ahmed Nwachri
- Nejmeddine Khalifa
- Chemseddine Khalifa
- Chadi Jabri
- Alaeddine Dhif
- Ahmed Ben Hadj Khalifa
- Issam Werhani
- Mohamed Achref Dhif
- Mohamed Gara Ali

== See also ==
- World Sevens Series
- Rugby World Cup Sevens
