= Nigeria national rugby sevens team =

Nigerian national rugby sevens team

Nigeria
- Union: Nigeria Rugby Football Federation

Rugby World Cup Sevens
- Appearances: 0

The Nigeria national rugby sevens team is a sporting side that represents Nigeria internationally in rugby sevens.

== History ==
Nigeria participated in the C.A.R (Confederation of African Rugby) in Marrakesh, Morocco on 24–25 September 2011. In the pool stages they defeated Senegal and Burkina Faso but were beaten by hosts Morocco, however they still progressed to the semi-finals where they were to face regular IRB participants, Tunisia. Nigeria were beaten in the semi-finals by a very experienced Tunisian team, however pride was restored in the 3rd/ 4th place playoff against Ivory Coast, where they came from behind in the second half to force the game into sudden death extra time where a last minute try by Craig Olugbode gave the victory to the Nigerian team. This meant Nigeria qualified for the All Africa 7s tournament in September 2012 which was the African regional ranking and qualifying tournament for the Rugby World Cup 7s in Russia in 2013.

In the African regional RWC 7s qualifier held again in Morocco on 29 and 30 September 2012 the Nigeria 7s team finished third overall and just missed out on RWC qualification. Failure to beat Madagascar in the group game despite dominating the match meant that Nigeria would play tournament favourites Zimbabwe in the semi-final rather than Tunisia. Nigeria lost 19-14 and Zimbabwe went on to beat Tunisia 31-7 in the final. Nigeria had the chance to redeem themselves however and beat Madagascar 20-12 in the 3rd/4th place playoff leaving them 5th ranked in Africa and the 3rd ranked African Commonwealth member.

Nigeria 7s qualified to participate at the Glasgow 2014 Commonwealth Games in Scotland. They were drawn alongside Canada, hosts Scotland and all-time Commonwealth champions New Zealand but the team was shockingly withdrawn by the Nigeria Olympic Committee (NOC) without clarifications as to why such a decision was made. A decision which according to IRB’s Mark Egan "Is disappointing for the Nigerian rugby team and their Rugby Union. There is a chance to get going with their Rugby 7s surge as the team will be competing at the Africa Men 7s in September 2014 in Kenya with the likes of South Africa, Kenya, Uganda, Namibia, Zimbabwe, Senegal, Madagascar, Tunisia, Morocco, Ivory Coast and Zambia."

The team finished in eight place at The Rugby Africa Men’s Sevens Olympic Qualifiers at the Barnard Stadium in Kempton Park, Johannesburg on Saturday 14th and Sunday 15 November 2015. injuries and knocks to five members of the team affected their overall performance as captain; Azeez Ladipo injured his shoulder in the early minutes of the first game and they managed him through some matches. Nuhu Samaila, Ike Onwukanjo, Onyinye Onwukanjo, Hafis Ayinla; were also injured leaving the team with one substitute in the last two matches. Coach Fabian Juries explained that the team improved from their 2014 outing where they placed eleventh and says there is room for more improvement. “We set a quarter final target and the boys met it but going forward, we need to work on strength and conditioning of the team and ensure they play together in more tournaments”.

== Players ==
=== Nigeria 7-A-Side Squad For Africa Cup 7s 2014 ===
- Lasisi kazeem (Nigeria Police RFC)
- Olanrewaju Azeez Abiodun (Nigeria Police RFC)
- Ayinla Hafis Adedamola (Cowrie RFC)
- Ladipo Azeez Olaitan (Cowrie RFC
- Peter Okere Ambrose (Jos RFC)
- Salihu Abdulmalik (Nigeria Police RFC)
- Oduntan Olatunji (Cowrie RFC)
- Ogar Christian Innocent (Cowrie RFC)
- Oladele John Siminuoluwa (Cowrie RFC)
- Abubakar Sadam (Zarie RFC)
- Lawal -Saulawa Isah (Abuja RFC)

Coach: Fabian Juries. Technical Adviser: Dele Coker

=== Nigeria 7-A-Side Squad For Africa Cup 7s (Rio Olympic Qualifiers) 2015 ===
- Azeez Ladipo (Cowrie RFC)
- Danjuma Mshelia (Richmond RFC)
- Ayinla Hafis Adedamola (Cowrie RFC)
- Omotohunola Odulaja (Loughborough University)
- Joseph Ayo Mogaji (Dorking RFC)
- Ikechukwu Onwukanjo (University of Buffalo RFC)
- Onyinye Onwukanjo (Davenport University Rugby)
- Ogar Christian Innocent (Cowrie RFC)
- Nuhu Samaila (Barewa RFC)
- Samuel Ekpo (Cowrie RFC)
- Onoru-Oyiza Jatto (Cowrie RFC)
- Alfred Ocheme (Plateau Tigers RFC)
- Okafor ThankgGod (Sharks RFC, South Africa)

Coach: Fabian Juries. Technical Adviser: Dele Coker, Physio: Ingomar Kruger, Doctor: Bukola Bojuwoye

=== Nigeria 7-A-Side Squad For Africa Cup 7s 2013 ===
- David Akinluyi (Old Mid-Whitgiftian RFC)
- Emmanuel Akinluyi (Old Mid-Whitgiftian RFC)
- Aristide Goualin (Old Priorians RFC)
- Chukwuma Osazuwa (Heriots RFC)
- Temitope Okenla (Old Mid-Whitgiftian RFC)
- Ben Adubi (Old Priorians RFC)
- James Doherty (Richmond FC)
- Ovie Koloko (Blackheath FC)
- Paul Olima (Civil Service RFC)
- DJ Mshelia (Old Blues RFC)
- Nd Monye (Unattached)
- Peter Cole (Tynedale RFC)

Coach: Sam Howard (Dulwich College), Manager: Mark Dean (Samurai International RFC), Physio: Emma Mark (Esher RFC)

=== Nigeria 7-A-Side Squad For RWC Qualifier 2012 ===
- William Sharp (Hull RL)
- Robert Worrincy (Halifax RL)
- David Akinluyi (Unattached)
- Emmanuel Akinluyi (University of Cambridge)
- Mark Olugbode (Westoe RFC)
- Joseph Mbu (Racing Club)
- Nuhu Ibrahim
- Ejike Uzoigwe (Stourbridge RFC)
- Kene Ejikeme (Unattached)
- Aristide Goualin (Old Priorians RFC)
- Chukwuma Osazuwa (Heriots RFC)
- Temitope Okenla (Old Mid-Whitgiftian RFC)

Coach: Steve Lewis (New York Blues), Manager: Mark Dean (Samurai International RFC), Physio: Emma Mark (Esher RFC)

=== Nigeria 7-A-Side Squad For 2011 ===
- David Akinluyi (Unattached)
- Emmanuel Akinluyi (University of Cambridge)
- Samuel Akinluyi (Westcombe Park RFC)
- Craig Olugbode (Westoe RFC)
- Joseph Mbu (Racing Club)
- Ubaka Onyekwelu (Chichester University)
- Martin Olima (Blackheath FC)
- Jay Udo-Udoma (Blackheath FC)
- Aristide Goualin (Old Priorians RFC)
- Chukwuma Osazuwa (Heriots RFC)
- James Doherty (Richmond FC)
- Adedoyin Layade (Unattached)

Manager: Mark Dean (Samurai International RFC), Physio: Emma Mark (Esher RFC)
