= Zimbabwe national rugby sevens team =

Zimbabwe Sevens
- Union: Zimbabwe Rugby Union
- Nickname: Cheetahs
- Coach: Ricky Chirengende
- Captain: Tapiwa Malenga(c)
Team kit

World Cup Sevens
- Appearances: 6 (First in 1997)
- Best result: 13th (2013)

The Zimbabwe national rugby sevens team competes in both domestic and international rugby sevens competitions. Zimbabwe competes in World Rugby Sevens Series events such as the South Africa Sevens and Hong Kong Sevens.

The team is nicknamed the Cheetahs. They traditionally play in a green and white strip on Day 1 of tournaments, and then a white and green strip on Day 2. Zimbabwe participated at the 2020 World Rugby Sevens Challenger Series. They also qualified for the 2020 Men's Rugby Sevens Final Olympic Qualification Tournament, but did not qualify for the Tokyo Olympics.

== Tournament history ==
=== Rugby World Cup Sevens ===
World Cup record
| Year | Round | Position | Pld | W | L | D |
|---|---|---|---|---|---|---|
| (Scotland) 1993 | Did not qualify | | | | | |
| (Hong Kong) 1997 | Bowl Quarterfinals | 21st | 5 | 1 | 4 | 0 |
| (Argentina) 2001 | Bowl Quarterfinals | 21st | 6 | 0 | 6 | 0 |
| (Hong Kong) 2005 | Did not qualify | | | | | |
| (United Arab Emirates) 2009 | Bowl Winners | 17st | 6 | 4 | 2 | 0 |
| (Russia) 2013 | Plate Quarterfinals | 13th | 4 | 1 | 3 | 0 |
| (United States) 2018 | Bowl Quarterfinals | 23rd | 4 | 1 | 3 | 0 |
| (South Africa) 2022 | 23rd Place Final | 23rd | 4 | 1 | 3 | 0 |
| Total | 0 Titles | 6/8 | 29 | 8 | 21 | 0 |

== Competition records ==
- Amsterdam 7s
  - 2006 - Cup Quarterfinals
- Benidorm 7s
  - 2005 - Plate Final
  - 2006 - Cup Semifinals
- Dubai 7s
  - 1999 - Bowl Final
  - 2000 - Plate Semifinals
  - 2003 - Shield Semifinals
  - 2006 - Bowl Finals
  - 2007 - Shield Winners
- Durban
  - 2000 - Bowl Quarterfinals
- George 7s
  - 2003 - Shield Semifinals
  - 2005 - Bowl Semifinals
  - 2006 - Shield Finals
  - 2010 - Shield Winners
- Hong Kong 7s
  - 1998 - Bowl Semifinals
  - 2008 - Bowl Final-Runners Up
- Safari 7s
  - 2003 - Plate Semifinals
  - 2006 - Cup Final
- Stellenbosch
  - 1999 - Bowl Quarterfinals
- Tokyo Sevens
  - 1997 - First Round
- Tunisia - Monastir
  - 2018 - African Sevens Champions

== Team ==
=== Current squad ===
Zimbabwe team to the 2020 Final Olympic Qualification tournament

Players called up to Zimbabwe's 2016 Men's Rugby Sevens Final Olympic Qualification Tournament squad.

Head Coach: (Zimbabwe) Gilbert Nyamutsamba

- Hilton Mudariki (c)
- Tafadzwa Chitokwindo
- Kuda Chiwanza
- Tendai Dzongodza
- Takudzwa Francisco
- Stephan Hunduza
- Takudzwa Kumadiro
- Kilvan Magunje
- Shayne Makombe
- David McWade
- Riaan O’Neill
- Boyd Rouse
- Manasah Sita
- Lucky Sithole
- Lenience Tambwera
- Biselele Tshamala
- Chinyama Celvin
- Hayden Wilson Jnr
