= Madagascar national rugby sevens team =

Minor nationals side

The Madagascar national rugby sevens team is a minor national sevens side.

== 2006 Hong Kong Sevens ==
Event	Winners	Score	Finalists	Semi Finalists	
Cup	England	26 - 24	Fiji	New Zealand; South Africa	Argentina; Australia; Samoa; Scotland
Plate	Wales	15 - 5	Kenya	Canada; France	Japan; Portugal; Russia; South Korea
Bowl	China	47 - 0	Chinese Taipei	Hong Kong; Sri Lanka	Italy; Madagascar; Singapore; United States
