= 2012 CAR Women's Sevens =

- Hosts: Morocco
- Date: 29−30 September
- Nations: 7

Final positions
- Champions: Tunisia
- Runners-up: Kenya
- Third: Uganda

Series details
- Matches played: 15

The 2012 CAR Women's Sevens was a qualification tournament for the 2013 Rugby World Cup Sevens which took place in Rabat on 29 to 30 September 2012. There was only one spot available in the World Cup for the region since South Africa had qualified automatically from their semifinal placement in the 2009 World Cup Sevens.

Tunisia defeated Kenya in the Cup final and qualified for the World Cup.

== Qualifications ==
=== 2011 CAR tournament - zone North ===
The tournament took place on 23 and 24 April n Thies, Senegal. Tournament semi-finalists will qualify for the 2012 CAR Women's Sevens, which will act as a qualifier for the 2013 World Cup. Nigeria withdrew at the last minute, Niger arrived with a team composed mainly by U18 girls and were excluded.

==== Pool stage ====
===== Pool A =====
Nation	Won	Drawn	Lost	For	Against
Tunisia	2	2	0	66	0
Burkina Faso	1	0	1	20	31
Egypt	2	0	2	5	60

- Tunisia 40-0 Egypt
- Burkina Faso 20-5 Egypt
- Tunisia 26-0 Burkina Faso

===== Pool B =====
Nation	Won	Drawn	Lost	For	Against
Senegal	2	0	0	22	12
Morocco	1	0	1	17	10
Cameroon	0	0	2	7	24

- Senegal 12-7 Cameroon
- Morocco 12-0 Cameroon
- Senegal 10-5 Morocco

==== Knockout stage ====
===== 5th place =====
5th Place
Cameroon	27
Egypt	0

===== Semi-finals =====
Semi-finals
Senegal	24
Burkina Faso	0
Tunisia	24
Morocco	0

Cup Final
Tunisia	5
Senegal	0
3rd Place
Morocco	19
Burkina Faso	5

=== 2011 CAR tournament - zone South ===
The tournament occurred on 29 and 30 October 2011 in Botswana. Tournament semi-finalists will qualify for the 2012 CAR Women's Sevens, which will act as a qualifier for the 2013 World Cup.

==== Teams ====
- Participants:
- Botswana
- South Africa
- Kenya
- Uganda
- Rwanda
- Zambia
- Zimbabwe
- Madagascar

==== Pools stage ====
===== Pool A =====
Nation	Won	Drawn	Lost	For	Against
South Africa	3	0	0	132	5
Zimbabwe	2	0	1	64	49
Zambia	1	0	2	32	53
Rwanda	0	0	3	0	111

- South Africa 34-0 Zambia
- Rwanda 0-40 Zimbabwe
- South Africa 37-5 Zimbabwe
- Rwanda 0-20 Zambia
- Zambia 12-19 Zimbabwe
- Rwanda 0-51 South Africa

===== Pool B =====
Nation	Won	Drawn	Lost	For	Against
Uganda	3	0	0	51	12
Kenya	2	0	1	65	27
Madagascar	1	0	2	24	46
Botswana	0	0	3	7	62

- Kenya 5-17 Uganda
- Botswana 0-14 Madagascar
- Kenya 29-10 Madagascar
- Botswana 7-17 Uganda
- Madagascar 0-17 Uganda
- Botswana 0-31 Kenya

==== Knockout stage ====
===== Plate semi-finals =====
Semi-finals
Botswana	5
Zambia	19
Madagascar	36
Rwanda	0

Plate Final
Zambia	15
Madagascar	14
7th Place
Botswana	24
Rwanda	0

===== Cup Semi-finals =====
Semi-finals
Kenya	5
South Africa	14
Uganda	7
Zimbabwe	0

Cup Final
South Africa	42
Uganda	5
3rd Place
Kenya	17
Zimbabwe	0

== Main tournament ==
=== Qualified teams ===
Eight teams were expected to compete, but Cameroon who replaced Burkina Faso withdrew from the tournament. Zambia replaced South Africa.

- Kenya
- Morocco
- Senegal
- Tunisia
- Uganda
- Zambia
- Zimbabwe

=== Pool stage ===
==== Pool A ====
Team	Pld	W	D	L	PF	PA	+/–	Pts
Kenya	3	3	0	0	77	5	+72	9
Tunisia	3	2	0	1	73	7	+66	7
Zambia	3	1	0	2	5	72	–67	5
Morocco	3	0	0	3	0	71	–71	3

29 September 2012

Tunisia	36–0	Zambia

Rabat

29 September 2012

Kenya	34–0	Morocco

Rabat

29 September 2012

Kenya	36–0	Zambia

Rabat

29 September 2012

Tunisia	32–0	Morocco

Rabat

29 September 2012

Morocco	0–5	Zambia

Rabat

29 September 2012

Tunisia	5–7	Kenya

Rabat

==== Pool B ====
Team	Pld	W	D	L	PF	PA	+/-	Pts
Uganda	2	2	0	0	34	5	+29	6
Senegal	2	1	0	1	7	27	-20	4
Zimbabwe	2	0	0	2	10	19	-9	2

29 September 2012

Senegal	7–5	Zimbabwe

Rabat

29 September 2012

Uganda	12–5	Zimbabwe

Rabat

29 September 2012

Uganda	22–0	Senegal

Rabat

=== Knockout round ===
==== Plate ====
Semi-finals
30 September 2012
Morocco	0
Zimbabwe	5
30 September 2012
Zambia	Bye

Plate Final
30 September 2012
Zimbabwe	14
Zambia	10

==== Cup ====
Semi-finals
30 September 2012
Kenya	7
Senegal	0
30 September 2012
Tunisia	19
Uganda	5

Cup / Qualifier Final
30 September 2012
Kenya	10
Tunisia	14
Third place
30 September 2012
Senegal	5
Uganda	12
