= 2022 Rugby World Cup Sevens qualifying – Women =

This is the qualifying process for the 2022 Rugby World Cup Sevens with the aim of selecting the women's national rugby sevens teams that will compete in the tournament in Cape Town, South Africa. A total of 47 nations took part in the qualifying process.

== General ==
The tournament is organized by World Rugby to be held from 9 to 11 September 2022, twenty-four teams in total will be competing. South Africa automatically qualified as hosts as well as the eight semi-finalists from the 2018 Rugby World Cup Sevens. The other 11 teams qualified through their respective regional tournaments.

== Qualified teams ==
Africa	North America	South America	Asia	Europe	Oceania
Automatic qualification
South Africa	United States			France	Australia; New Zealand
Regional Qualifiers
Madagascar	Canada	Brazil; Colombia	China; Japan	England; Ireland; Poland; Spain	Fiji

== Qualifying ==
Legend
Qualified to 2022 Rugby World Cup Sevens
Automatically Qualified

=== Africa ===
Nine teams competed in the African Women's Sevens tournament on 29–30 April 2022 in Jemmal, Tunisia contesting for the qualifying spot. South Africa qualified automatically as hosts, Madagascar secured the World Cup spot as runners-up.

Pos	Team
1	South Africa
2	Madagascar
3	Tunisia
4	Uganda
5	Kenya
6	Zambia
7	Ghana
8	Zimbabwe
9	Senegal

=== North America ===
Only five teams competed in the RAN Sevens Qualifiers on 23–24 April 2022 in Nassau, Bahamas contesting for the single qualifying spot, Canada qualified for the World Cup after winning the tournament.

Pos	Team
1	Canada
2	Mexico
3	Jamaica
3	Trinidad and Tobago
5	Cayman Islands

=== South America ===
Ten teams competed in the Sudamérica Sevens tournament on 11–12 November 2021 in Montevideo, Uruguay. Brazil and Colombia were the two teams to book their World Cup spots.

Rank	Team
1	Brazil
2	Colombia
3	Argentina
4	Paraguay
5	Uruguay
6	Chile
7	Peru
8	Costa Rica
9	Guatemala
10	Panama

=== Asia ===
Eight teams competed for the two qualifying spots on 19–20 November 2021 in Dubai with Japan and China going through.

Rank	Team
1	Japan
2	China
3	Hong Kong
4	Kazakhstan
5	Thailand
6	Sri Lanka
7	Malaysia
8	Philippines

=== Europe ===
Twelve teams competed in the European Qualifiers for the four available spots on 16–17 July 2022 in Bucharest, Romania. Ireland, Poland, England, and Spain were the four teams to qualify.

Seed	Team	Pool	Pld	W	D	L	PF	PA	PD	Pts
1	Ireland (Q)	A	3	3	0	0	141	0	+141	9
2	Poland (Q)	C	3	3	0	0	123	20	+103	9
3	England (Q)	B	3	3	0	0	98	10	+88	9
4	Spain (Q)	C	3	2	0	1	86	41	+45	7
5	Czech Republic	A	3	2	0	1	64	71	-7	7
6	Belgium	B	3	2	0	1	63	46	+17	7
7	Portugal	C	3	1	0	2	48	88	-40	5
8	Germany	A	3	1	0	2	34	69	-35	5
9	Romania	B	3	1	0	2	31	75	-44	5
10	Italy	B	3	0	0	3	29	90	-61	3
11	Wales	A	3	0	0	3	21	120	-99	3
12	Sweden	C	3	0	0	3	10	128	-118	3

=== Oceania ===
Oceania was unable to hold any qualifying tournament due to the ongoing impacts of COVID-19 in 2021 and 2022. Australia and New Zealand had qualified automatically as semi-finalists from the 2018 Sevens World Cup. Fiji qualified due to finishing 7th in the 2019–20 Women's Sevens Series.
