= Rugby sevens at the 2020 Summer Olympics – Women's qualification =

Twelve teams qualify for women's rugby sevens at the 2020 Summer Olympics (postponed to 2021 due to the COVID-19 pandemic). Japan automatically qualifies as host, with the top four teams of the 2018–19 World Rugby Women's Sevens Series securing their spots. Afterwards, qualification is determined with each of the six continental confederations determining a representative, and the remaining qualification spot determined through an international sevens tournament to be determined.

== Table ==
Event	Dates	Location	Quotas	Qualifier
Host	—N/a	—N/a	1	Japan
2018–19 World Rugby Women's Sevens Series	20 October 2018 – 16 June 2019	Various	4	New Zealand
2018–19 World Rugby Women's Sevens Series	20 October 2018 – 16 June 2019	Various	4	United States
2018–19 World Rugby Women's Sevens Series	20 October 2018 – 16 June 2019	Various	4	Canada
2018–19 World Rugby Women's Sevens Series	20 October 2018 – 16 June 2019	Various	4	Australia
2019 South American Qualifying Tournament	1–2 June 2019	(Peru) Lima	1	Brazil
2019 RAN Women's Sevens	6–7 July 2019	(Cayman Islands) George Town	0 (Note: With both the United States and Canada advancing to the tournament through securing top four slots in the 2018–19 World Rugby Women's Sevens Series, the spot for the RAN champion was re-allocated, allowing the final Olympic qualifying tournament to have two teams qualify for the Olympic Games.)	—
2019 European Qualifying Tournament	13–14 July 2019	(Russia) Kazan	1	Great Britain (Note: Great Britain qualified for the Olympics through England's performance as England were the designated home nation that could earn Olympic qualification for Great Britain. Rugby sevens players from Scotland and Wales, however, were eligible to be selected for the British team at the Olympic Games.)
2019 Africa Women's Sevens	12–13 October 2019	(Tunisia) Jemmal	1	Kenya (Note: South Africa won the qualifying tournament but declined their spot due to a policy against accepting spots from continental tournaments. Kenya, as runner-up, qualified instead.)
2019 Oceania Women's Sevens Championship	7–9 November 2019	(Fiji) Suva	1	Fiji
2019 Asian Qualifying Tournament	9–10 November 2019	(China) Guangzhou	1	China
2020 Final Olympic Qualification Tournament	19–20 June 2021	Monaco	2	France
2020 Final Olympic Qualification Tournament	19–20 June 2021	Monaco	2	ROC
Total				12

- Notes:

== 2018–19 World Rugby Women's Sevens Series ==
As a principal route for the tournament, four places were determined by performance in the series over six tournaments.

2018–19 Core Teams
Pos	Event Team	Glendale	Dubai	Sydney	Kitakyushu	Langford	Biarritz	Points total
1	New Zealand	20	20	20	12	20	18	110
2	United States	18	14	16	16	16	20	100
3	Canada	16	18	12	20	12	16	94
4	Australia	12	16	18	10	18	12	86
5	France	14	8	10	14	14	10	70
6	England (Note: By agreement between the three unions on the island of Great Britain (England, Scotland, Wales), England represented Great Britain in qualifying for the 2020 Olympic Sevens. The final make-up of the Great Britain women's team was determined by the British Olympic Association.)	6	10	3	18	10	3	50
7	Russia	8	12	8	6	8	6	48
8	Ireland	10	6	14	8	2	1	41
9	Spain	4	3	6	3	6	14	36
10	Fiji	3	2	4	4	4	4	21
11	China	2	4	2	2	3	8	21

- Notes:

== Africa ==
Rugby Africa held the 2019 Africa Women's Sevens on 12–13 October 2019 at Jemmal, Tunisia. With South Africa declining their Olympic qualification spot, Kenya advanced to the Olympic tournament.

Pool A

Team	Pld	W	D	L	PF	PA	PD	Pts
Kenya	3	3	0	0	123	0	+123	9
Senegal	3	2	0	1	36	56	−20	7
Ghana	3	1	0	2	22	63	−41	5
Botswana	3	0	0	3	20	82	−62	3

Pool B

Team	Pld	W	D	L	PF	PA	PD	Pts
South Africa	3	3	0	0	99	0	+99	9
Uganda	3	2	0	1	25	47	−22	7
Zimbabwe	3	1	0	2	17	48	−31	5
Zambia	3	0	0	3	17	63	−46	3

Pool C

Team	Pld	W	D	L	PF	PA	PD	Pts
Madagascar	3	3	0	0	89	7	+82	9
Tunisia	3	2	0	1	76	14	+62	7
Morocco	3	1	0	2	41	65	−24	5
Mauritius	3	0	0	3	0	120	−120	3

Knockout Round

Quarter-finals
13 Oct 2019 – 9:30 – Jemmal, Tunisia
South Africa	42
Morocco	0
13 Oct 2019 – 9:52 – Jemmal, Tunisia
Madagascar	24
Senegal	5
13 Oct 2019 – 10:14 – Jemmal, Tunisia
Uganda	0
Tunisia	33
13 Oct 2019 – 10:36 – Jemmal, Tunisia
Kenya	36
Zimbabwe	5

Semi-finals
13 Oct 2019 – 13:20 – Jemmal, Tunisia
South Africa	29
Madagascar	0
13 Oct 2019 – 13:42 – Jemmal, Tunisia
Tunisia	0
Kenya	19

Final
13 Oct 2019 – 16:30 – Jemmal, Tunisia
South Africa	15
Kenya	14
Third place
13 Oct 2019 – 16:04 – Jemmal, Tunisia
Madagascar	5
Tunisia	0

== Asia ==
Asia Rugby held a tournament on 9–10 November 2019 in Guangzhou, China. Japan, already qualified for the Olympics as the host country, did not enter. China won the tournament and gained direct qualification.

Pool A

Team	Pld	W	D	L	PF	PA	PD	Pts
China	3	3	0	0	146	7	+139	9
Hong Kong	3	2	0	1	81	49	+32	7
Sri Lanka	3	1	0	2	26	87	–61	5
South Korea	3	0	0	3	5	115	–110	3

Pool B

Team	Pld	W	D	L	PF	PA	PD	Pts
Kazakhstan	3	3	0	0	97	17	+80	9
Thailand	3	2	0	1	81	17	+64	7
Singapore	3	1	0	2	20	98	–78	5
Philippines	3	0	0	3	24	90	–66	3

Knockout round

Semi-finals
10 November – 13:14 – Guangzhou
Kazakhstan	7
Hong Kong	19
10 November – 13:36 – Guangzhou
China	34
Thailand	0

Final
10 November – 16:30 – Guangzhou
Hong Kong	0
China	33
Third place
10 November – 16:04 – Guangzhou
Kazakhstan	17
Thailand	14

== Europe ==
Rugby Europe held a tournament on 13–14 July 2019 in Kazan, Russia. England won the tournament, meaning that Great Britain qualified for the Olympics.

Teams eligible to compete in the tournament included:

- The top seven placed Olympic teams in the 2019 Marcoussis Women's Sevens, with England representing Great Britain
- The top four placed teams in the 2019 Rugby Europe Women's Sevens Trophy
- The 2019 Rugby Europe Women's Sevens Conference winner

Pool A

Team	Pld	W	D	L	PF	PA	PD	Pts
France	3	3	0	0	125	5	+120	9
Poland	3	2	0	1	67	46	+21	7
Italy	3	1	0	2	48	69	–21	5
Moldova	3	0	0	3	5	125	–120	3

Pool B

Team	Pld	W	D	L	PF	PA	PD	Pts
Russia	3	3	0	0	110	5	+105	9
England	3	2	0	1	114	26	+88	7
Sweden	3	1	0	2	29	84	–55	5
Germany	3	0	0	3	5	143	–138	3

Pool C

Team	Pld	W	D	L	PF	PA	PD	Pts
Spain	3	3	0	0	89	12	+77	9
Ireland	3	2	0	1	103	19	+84	7
Romania	3	1	0	2	34	88	–54	5
Czech Republic	3	0	0	3	12	119	–107	3

Knockout stage

Quarter-finals
14 July – 10:00 – Central Stadium
France	55
Romania	0
14 July – 11:06 – Central Stadium
England	17
Ireland	7
14 July – 10:22 – Central Stadium
Russia	44
Italy	0
14 July – 10:44 – Central Stadium
Spain	17
Poland	14

Semi-finals
14 July – 13:59 – Central Stadium
France	12
England	14
14 July – 14:21 – Central Stadium
Russia	12
Spain	5

Final
14 July – 17:11 – Central Stadium
England	19
Russia	0
Third place
14 July – 16:46 – Central Stadium
France	17
Spain	5

== North America ==
Rugby Americas North held the 2019 RAN Women's Sevens on 6–7 July 2019 at George Town, Cayman Islands. With the United States and Canada both qualifying through the Women's Sevens Series, the first and second placed teams Jamaica and Mexico advanced to the final qualifying tournament.

Team	Pld	W	D	L	PF	PA	PD	Pts
Jamaica	5	5	0	0	164	24	+140	15
Mexico	5	3	1	1	112	49	+63	10
Saint Lucia	5	3	0	2	73	42	+31	9
Trinidad and Tobago	5	2	1	2	88	61	+27	7
Bermuda	5	1	0	4	15	156	–141	3
Bahamas	5	0	0	5	20	140	–120	0

== Oceania ==
Oceania Rugby held the 2019 Oceania Women's Sevens Championship on 7–9 November 2019 at Suva, Fiji. With Australia and New Zealand already qualified through the Women's Sevens Series, Fiji gained direct qualification to the Olympics while Papua New Guinea and Samoa advanced to the final qualifying tournament.

Pool B

Team	Pld	W	D	L	PF	PA	PD	Pts
Fiji	3	3	0	0	189	0	+189	9
Solomon Islands	3	1	0	2	41	97	–56	5
Vanuatu	3	1	0	2	29	85	–56	5
Nauru	3	1	0	2	27	104	–77	5

Pool C

Team	Pld	W	D	L	PF	PA	PD	Pts
Papua New Guinea	3	3	0	0	88	22	+66	9
Samoa	3	2	0	1	74	36	+38	7
Cook Islands	3	1	0	2	56	45	+11	5
Tonga	3	0	0	3	5	120	–115	3

Knockout stage

Semi-finals
9 November – 12:12 – ANZ Stadium
Fiji	43
Samoa	0
9 November – 12:34 – ANZ Stadium
Papua New Guinea	31
Solomon Islands	7

Olympic qualifier
9 November – 18:35 – ANZ Stadium
Fiji	36
Papua New Guinea	0
Repechage qualifier
9 November – 16:58 – ANZ Stadium
Samoa	45
Solomon Islands	0

== South America ==
Sudamérica Rugby held a tournament on 1–2 June 2019 in Lima, Peru. Brazil won direct qualification to the Olympics while the second and third placed teams Colombia and Argentina advanced to the final qualifying tournament.

Pool A

Team	Pld	W	D	L	PF	PA	PD	Pts
Brazil	4	4	0	0	200	17	+183	12
Peru	4	3	0	1	80	50	+30	10
Paraguay	4	2	0	2	65	79	–14	8
Venezuela	4	1	0	3	36	123	–87	6
Guatemala	4	0	0	4	15	127	–112	4

Pool B

Team	Pld	W	D	L	PF	PA	PD	Pts
Colombia	4	3	1	0	164	31	+133	11
Argentina	4	3	1	0	154	24	+130	11
Chile	4	2	0	2	45	64	–19	8
Uruguay	4	1	0	3	25	112	–87	6
Costa Rica	4	0	0	4	0	157	–157	4

Knockout

Semi-finals
2 June 2019 – 12:32 – Andrés Avelino Cáceres Complex
Brazil	36
Argentina	14
2 June 2019 – 12:54 – Andrés Avelino Cáceres Complex
Colombia	19
Peru	5

Final
2 June 2019 – 15:12 – Andrés Avelino Cáceres Complex
Brazil	28
Colombia	15
Third place
2 June 2019 – 14:50 – Andrés Avelino Cáceres Complex
Argentina	22
Peru	12

== Olympic qualification event ==
A 12-team repechage tournament was scheduled to be held from 20 to 21 June 2020, but was postponed due to the COVID-19 pandemic. A new venue and date for the tournament has yet to be announced. Two runners-up from each of the six continental qualification tournaments will play, with the winner and runner-up advancing to the Olympic tournament.

Continent	Qualifiers
Africa	Madagascar
Africa	Tunisia (Note: Kenya originally qualified for the OQE as the second-placed team but instead advanced directly to the Olympics after South Africa declined their place. They were replaced by Tunisia, the fourth-placed team.)
Asia	Hong Kong
Asia	Kazakhstan
Europe
Europe	France
Europe	Russia
North America	Jamaica
North America	Mexico
Oceania	Papua New Guinea
Oceania	Samoa
South America	Argentina
South America	Colombia
Total	12

- Notes:

== See also ==
- Rugby sevens at the 2020 Summer Olympics – Men's qualification
