= 2014 CAR Women's Sevens =

- Hosts: Kenya
- Date: 12 April
- Nations: 8

Final positions
- Champions: South Africa
- Runners-up: Kenya
- Third: Tunisia

Series details
- Matches played: 20

The 2014 CAR Women's Sevens was a regional tournament that was held in Machakos, Kenya on 12 April. South Africa successfully defended their title with a win over Kenya in the Cup final, they went undefeated throughout the competition.

== Teams ==
Eight teams competed in the tournament.

- Kenya
- Madagascar
- Namibia
- Senegal
- South Africa
- Tunisia
- Uganda
- Zimbabwe

== Pool Stage ==
=== Pool A ===
Nation	Won	Drawn	Lost	For	Against	PD
South Africa	3	0	0	59	12	47
Kenya	2	0	1	58	35	23
Madagascar	1	0	2	45	57	–12
Senegal	0	0	3	14	60	–46

Senegal	14–19	Madagascar

Kenya	24–14	Madagascar

South Africa	19–0	Senegal

Kenya	22–0	Senegal

South Africa	19–12	Madagascar

South Africa	21–12	Kenya

=== Pool B ===
Nation	Won	Drawn	Lost	For	Against	PD
Tunisia	3	0	0	64	7	57
Zimbabwe	2	0	1	43	26	17
Uganda	1	0	2	57	24	33
Namibia	0	0	3	0	107	–107

Zimbabwe	33–0	Namibia

Uganda	45–0	Namibia

Tunisia	21–0	Zimbabwe

Uganda	5–10	Zimbabwe

Tunisia	29–0	Namibia

Tunisia	14–7	Uganda

== Classification Stage ==
=== Bowl Semi-finals ===
Semi-finals
Namibia	0
Madagascar	40
Uganda	24
Senegal	10

Bowl Final
Uganda	10
Madagascar	5
Shield Final (7th Place)
Senegal	33
Namibia	0

=== Cup Semi-finals ===
Semi-finals
Tunisia	10
Kenya	14
South Africa	43
Zimbabwe	0

Cup Final
South Africa	15
Kenya	0
Plate Final (3rd Place)
Tunisia	31
Zimbabwe	0
