= 2008 CAR Women's Sevens =

- Hosts: Uganda
- Date: 20−21 September
- Nations: 8

Final positions
- Champions: South Africa
- Runners-up: Uganda
- Third: Kenya

Series details
- Matches played: 20

The 2008 CAR Women's Sevens was a qualification tournament for the inaugural 2009 Women's Rugby World Cup Sevens, the competition was held on 20−21 September in Kampala, Uganda. South Africa and hosts, Uganda, were the teams to claim the two available slots for the tournament.

== Teams ==
- Botswana
- Kenya
- South Africa
- Tunisia
- Uganda
- Uganda A
- Zambia
- Zimbabwe

== Pool Stage ==
=== Pool A ===
Teams	Pld	W	D	L	PF	PA	+/−	Pts
South Africa	3	3	0	0	110	5	+105	9
Kenya	3	2	0	1	42	55	–13	7
Zambia	3	1	0	2	50	51	–1	5
Uganda A	3	0	0	3	0	91	–91	3

20 September 2008

South Africa	43−0	Uganda A

20 September 2008

Kenya	20−19	Zambia

20 September 2008

South Africa	31−0	Zambia

20 September 2008

Kenya	17−0	Uganda A

20 September 2008

Zambia	31−0	Uganda A

20 September 2008

South Africa	36−5	Kenya

=== Pool B ===
Teams	Pld	W	D	L	PF	PA	+/−	Pts
Tunisia	3	3	0	0	110	5	+105	9
Uganda	3	2	0	1	81	12	+69	7
Zimbabwe	3	1	0	2	24	83	–59	5
Botswana	3	0	0	3	0	115	–115	3

20 September 2008

Uganda	30−0	Zimbabwe

20 September 2008

Tunisia	45−0	Botswana

20 September 2008

Uganda	46−0	Botswana

20 September 2008

Tunisia	53−0	Zimbabwe

20 September 2008

Zimbabwe	24−0	Botswana

20 September 2008

Tunisia	12−5	Uganda

== Playoff Stage ==
=== Plate ===
Semi-finals
21 September 2008
Zambia	26
Uganda A	10
21 September 2008
Zimbabwe	17
Botswana	0

Final
21 September 2008
Zambia	38
Zimbabwe	0
Third place
21 September 2008
Uganda A	20
Botswana	7

=== Cup ===
Semi-finals
21 September 2008
South Africa	26
Kenya	5
21 September 2008
Tunisia	0
Uganda	7

Final
21 September 2008
South Africa	24
Uganda	0
Third place
21 September 2008
Kenya	15
Tunisia	14
