= Rugby sevens at the 2023 African Games =

Rugby sevens at the 2023 Africa Games
- Venue: UoG rugby stadium
- Location: Accra, Ghana
- Dates: 19–21 March 2024

Rugby sevens at the 2023 African Games will be held in Accra, Ghana, from 19 to 21 March 2024. Both men's and women's tournaments will be held in Rugby sevens format. This will be the first time that rugby will be played at the African Games.

== Schedule ==
G	Group stage

Date Event
Date Event	19 Tue	20 Wed	21 Thu
Men	G	G	G
Women		G	G

== Participating nations ==
=== Men ===
7 teams were scheduled to compete in rugby.

- Benin
- Burkina Faso
- Ghana
- Kenya
- Tunisia
- Uganda
- Zimbabwe

=== Women ===
5 teams were scheduled to compete in rugby.

- Ghana
- Madagascar
- Nigeria
- Tunisia
- Uganda

== Medal summary ==
=== Results ===
Event	Gold	Silver	Bronze
Men	Uganda; Aaron Ofoyrwoth; Aaron Tukei; Adrian Kasito; Alex Aturinda; Batholomew Roy Kizito; Davis Shimwa; Denis Etwau; Desire Ruhweza Ayera; Ian Arnold Munyani; Isaac Mussanganzira	Zimbabwe; Carlos Matematema; Dion Dumisani Khumalo; Edward Makomborero Sigauke; Godfrey Ryan Magaramombe; Kudakwashe Hilton Mudariki; Kudakwashe Nyamakura; Munyaradzi Ngandu; Nigel Anesu Tinarwo; Ryan Musumhi; Shadreck Panashe Mandaza	Burkina Faso; Abdoul Ouedraogo; Adama Deme; Bognomo Sthéphane Bationo; Cheick Abasse Sawadogo; Cheick Hamidou Ouedraogo; Christian Ssawadogo; Hephaistos Cedrigue Gaba; Jean Baptiste Aubin Mathias; Kassoum Deme; Mouhamed Djerma
Women	Uganda; Agnes Nakuya; Gertrude Junior Kateesa; Grace Auma; Grace Nabaggala; Lydia Namabiro; Mary Gloria Ayot; Mayimuna Nassozi; Peace Lekuru; Unity Namulala; Yvonne Najjuma	Madagascar; Oliviane Andriatsilavina; Marie Christine Bodonandrianina; Mamy Nirina Hanitriniaina; Joela Rafaliharimanana; Delphine Raharimalala; Ginah Raharimalala; Felaniaina Rakotoarison; Laurence Rasoanandrasana; Valisoa Razakaniaina; Tiana Razanamahefa	Tunisia; Ahed Ragoubi; Amna Ben Arous; Chourouk Msabhia; Habiba Lafi; Halima Ben Charrada; Lamia Mlawah; Nour Ayari; Nour Elhouda Jlali; Oumayma Dziri; Ranim Haddouri

=== Medal table ===
* Host nation (Ghana)

Rank	NOC	Gold	Silver	Bronze	Total
1	Uganda (UGA)	2	0	0	2
2	Madagascar (MAD)	0	1	0	1
2	Zimbabwe (ZIM)	0	1	0	1
4	Burkina Faso (BUR)	0	0	1	1
4	Tunisia (TUN)	0	0	1	1
Totals (5 entries)		2	2	2	6
