= 2016 Rugby World Women's Sevens Olympic Repechage Tournament =

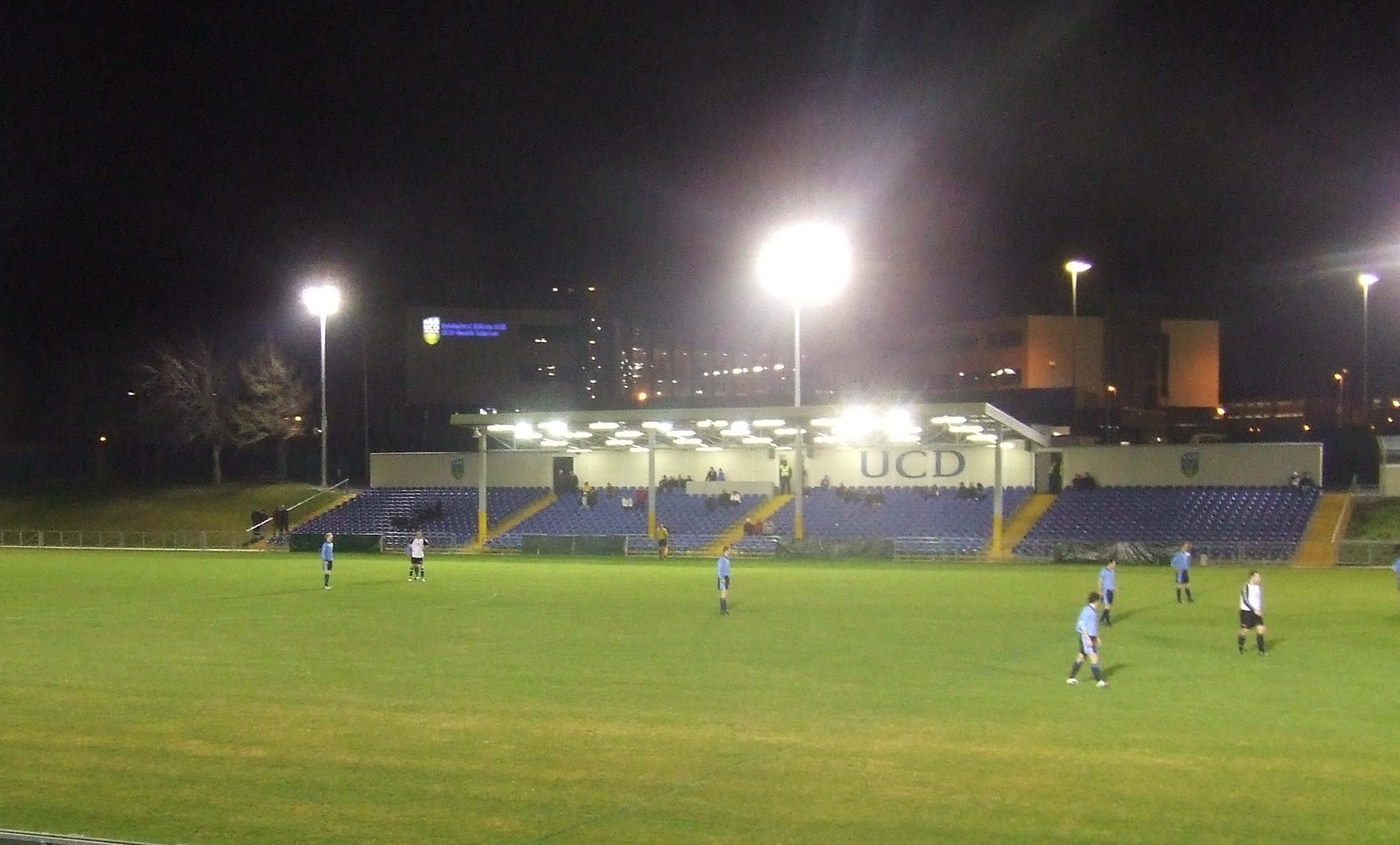
- The tournament venue, UCD Bowl in Dublin.
- Hosts: Ireland
- Date: 25–26 June 2016
- Nations: 16

Final positions
- Champions: Spain
- Runners-up: Russia
- Third: Ireland

The 2016 Rugby World Women's Sevens Olympic Repechage Tournament was a qualification tournament for the women's rugby sevens 2016 Summer Olympics which was held on 25–26 June 2016. The tournament used a round-robin format, with the top team qualifying directly to the Olympics.

The tournament took place at the UCD Bowl in Dublin, Ireland.

== Teams ==
Means of qualification	Completed date	Venue	Berths	Qualified
2015 CONSUR Women's Sevens	7 June 2015	(Argentina) Santa Fe	2	Argentina
2015 CONSUR Women's Sevens	7 June 2015	(Argentina) Santa Fe	2	Venezuela
2015 NACRA Women's Sevens	14 June 2015	(United States) Cary	2	Mexico
2015 NACRA Women's Sevens	14 June 2015	(United States) Cary	2	Trinidad and Tobago
2015 Rugby Europe Women's Sevens Grand Prix	21 June 2015	Various	1	Russia
2015 Rugby Europe Women's Sevens Repechage	19 July 2015	(Portugal) Lisbon	3	Ireland
2015 Rugby Europe Women's Sevens Repechage	19 July 2015	(Portugal) Lisbon	3	Portugal
2015 Rugby Europe Women's Sevens Repechage	19 July 2015	(Portugal) Lisbon	3	Spain
2015 Women's Africa Cup Sevens	27 September 2015	(South Africa) Johannesburg	3	Madagascar^{[1]}
2015 Women's Africa Cup Sevens	27 September 2015	(South Africa) Johannesburg	3	Tunisia
2015 Women's Africa Cup Sevens	27 September 2015	(South Africa) Johannesburg	3	Zimbabwe
2015 FORU Women's Sevens Championships	15 November 2015	(New Zealand) Auckland	2	Cook Islands
2015 FORU Women's Sevens Championships	15 November 2015	(New Zealand) Auckland	2	Samoa
2015 ARFU Women's Sevens Championships	29 November 2015	Various	3	China
2015 ARFU Women's Sevens Championships	29 November 2015	Various	3	Hong Kong
2015 ARFU Women's Sevens Championships	29 November 2015	Various	3	Kazakhstan
Total			16	

1. Kenya, as the runners-up in the African qualifying tournament, would have qualified to this tournament, but instead qualified directly for the Olympics after South Africa withdrew. Madagascar, the fifth-place finisher in qualifying, was named as a replacement.

== Pool stage ==
=== Pool A ===
Teams	Pld	W	D	L	PF	PA	+/−	Pts
Russia	3	3	0	0	164	0	+164	9
Samoa	3	2	0	1	79	62	+17	7
Madagascar	3	1	0	2	29	97	–68	5
Zimbabwe	3	0	0	3	22	135	–113	3

Matches

25 June 2016
11:28

Samoa	57–5	Zimbabwe

25 June 2016
11:50

Russia	58–0	Madagascar

25 June 2016
14:34

Samoa	22–10	Madagascar

25 June 2016
14:56

Russia	59–0	Zimbabwe

25 June 2016
17:40

Zimbabwe	17–19	Madagascar

25 June 2016
18:02

Russia	47–0	Samoa

=== Pool B ===
Teams	Pld	W	D	L	PF	PA	+/−	Pts
Spain	3	3	0	0	121	0	+121	9
Tunisia	3	2	0	1	39	48	–9	7
Venezuela	3	0	1	2	15	67	–52	4
Mexico	3	0	1	2	5	65	–60	4

Matches

25 June 2016
10:44

Mexico	5–5	Venezuela

25 June 2016
11:06

Spain	38–0	Tunisia

25 June 2016
13:50

Mexico	0–22	Tunisia

25 June 2016
14:12

Spain	45–0	Venezuela

25 June 2016
16:56

Venezuela	10–17	Tunisia

25 June 2016
17:18

Spain	38–0	Mexico

=== Pool C ===
Teams	Pld	W	D	L	PF	PA	+/−	Pts
Ireland	3	3	0	0	87	12	+75	9
China	3	2	0	1	58	22	+36	7
Portugal	3	1	0	2	59	48	+11	5
Trinidad and Tobago	3	0	0	3	5	127	–122	3

Matches

25 June 2016
12:12

China	24–5	Portugal

25 June 2016
12:34

Ireland	51–0	Trinidad and Tobago

25 June 2016
15:18

China	34–5	Trinidad and Tobago

25 June 2016
15:40

Ireland	24–12	Portugal

25 June 2016
18:24

Portugal	42–0	Trinidad and Tobago

25 June 2016
18:46

Ireland	12–0	China

=== Pool D ===
Teams	Pld	W	D	L	PF	PA	+/−	Pts
Kazakhstan	3	3	0	0	69	22	+47	9
Argentina	3	2	0	1	39	63	–24	7
Hong Kong	3	0	1	2	39	50	–11	4
Cook Islands	3	0	1	2	29	41	–12	4

Matches

25 June 2016
10:00

Argentina	5–36	Kazakhstan

25 June 2016
10:22

Hong Kong	12–12	Cook Islands

25 June 2016
13:06

Argentina	17–12	Cook Islands

25 June 2016
13:28

Hong Kong	12–21	Kazakhstan

25 June 2016
16:12

Kazakhstan	12–5	Cook Islands

25 June 2016
16:34

Hong Kong	15–17	Argentina

== Knockout stage ==
=== Shield ===
Semi-finals
Madagascar	10
Mexico	0
Zimbabwe	12
Trinidad and Tobago	5

Final
Madagascar	22
Zimbabwe	12

=== Bowl ===
Quarter-finals
Madagascar	0
Cook Islands	7
Portugal	29
Mexico	0
Hong Kong	20
Zimbabwe	0
Venezuela	17
Trinidad and Tobago	0

Semi-finals
Cook Islands	24
Portugal	14
Hong Kong	24
Venezuela	5

Final
Cook Islands	17
Hong Kong	12

=== Plate ===
Semi-finals
Argentina	17
Tunisia	7
Samoa	5
China	28

Final
Argentina	0
China	33

=== Cup ===
Quarter-finals
Russia	34
Argentina	0
Ireland	38
Tunisia	0
Kazakhstan	26
Samoa	0
Spain	21
China	0

Semi-finals
Russia	19
Ireland	10
Kazakhstan	0
Spain	28

Final
Russia	12
Spain	19
Third place
Ireland	17
Kazakhstan	5

== See also ==
- Rugby sevens at the 2020 Summer Olympics – Women's qualification
