= 2007 CAR Women's Sevens =

- Hosts: Uganda
- Date: 16 June 2007
- Nations: 8

Final positions
- Champions: South Africa
- Runners-up: Uganda

Series details
- Matches played: 26

The 2007 CAR Women's Sevens was a regional tournament that took place on 16 June 2007 at the Kyadondo Rugby Club in Kampala, Uganda. Emerging South Africa won the tournament after defeating Uganda in the Cup final.

== Teams ==
Ten teams competed at the tournament:

- Burundi
- Emerging South Africa
- Kenya
- (South Africa) Pretoria University Tukkies
- Rwanda
- Tunisia
- Uganda
- Uganda Select
- Zambia
- Zimbabwe

== Pool Stages ==
=== Pool One ===
Nation	Won	Drawn	Lost	For	Against
Emerging South Africa	4	0	0	125	24
Kenya	3	0	1	98	38
Uganda Select	2	0	2	37	47
Zambia	1	0	3	90	41
Burundi	0	0	4	0	200

Emerging South Africa	14–12	Zambia

Kenya	57–0	Burundi

Emerging South Africa	28–0	Uganda Select

Kenya	17–14	Zambia

Emerging South Africa	59–0	Burundi

Zambia	7–10	Uganda Select

Kenya	12–0	Uganda Select

Zambia	57–0	Burundi

Burundi	0–27	Uganda Select

Emerging South Africa	24–12	Kenya

=== Pool Two ===
Nation	Won	Drawn	Lost	For	Against
Uganda	4	0	0	129	10
Tunisia	3	0	1	109	27
(South Africa) Pretoria University Tukkies	2	0	2	85	40
Zimbabwe	1	0	3	24	122
Rwanda	0	0	4	5	153

Uganda	44–0	Rwanda

Tunisia	14–10	(South Africa) Pretoria University Tukkies

Uganda	42–0	Zimbabwe

Tunisia	47–0	Rwanda

Uganda	26–5	(South Africa) Pretoria University Tukkies

Rwanda	5–24	Zimbabwe

Tunisia	43–0	Zimbabwe

Rwanda	0–38	(South Africa) Pretoria University Tukkies

Pretoria University Tukkies (South Africa)	32–0	Zimbabwe

Uganda	17–5	Tunisia

== Classification Stages ==
=== Plate Semi-finals ===
Semi-finals
Uganda Select	36
Zimbabwe	0
(South Africa) Pretoria University Tukkies	5
Zambia	26

Plate Final
Zambia	21
Uganda Select	5

=== Cup Semi-finals ===
Semi-finals
Uganda	14
Kenya	0
Emerging South Africa	34
Tunisia	0

Cup Final
Emerging South Africa	20
Uganda	7
