= 2013 CAR Women's Sevens =

- Hosts: Tunisia
- Date: 20 & 21 April 2013
- Nations: 6

Final positions
- Champions: South Africa
- Runners-up: Tunisia
- Third: Uganda

Series details
- Matches played: 11

The 2013 CAR Women's Sevens was a regional tournament that was held in Tunis, Tunisia on 20 and 21 April 2013. SouthcAfrica defeated hosts, Tunisia, to win the Championship.

== Teams ==
Six teams competed in the tournament:

- Kenya
- Senegal
- South Africa
- Tunisia
- Uganda
- Zimbabwe

== Pool Stage ==
=== Pool A ===
Nation	Won	Drawn	Lost	For	Against
South Africa	2	0	0	63	0
Kenya	1	0	1	29	43
Senegal	0	0	2	7	56

South Africa	27–0	Senegal

Kenya	29–7	Senegal

South Africa	36–0	Kenya

=== Pool B ===
Nation	Won	Drawn	Lost	For	Against
Tunisia	2	0	0	29	5
Uganda	1	0	1	29	12
Zimbabwe	0	0	2	0	41

Tunisia	17–0	Zimbabwe

Uganda	24–0	Zimbabwe

Tunisia	12–5	Uganda

== Classification Stage ==
=== Cup Semi-finals ===
Semi-finals
South Africa	17
Uganda	0
Tunisia	15
Kenya	7

Cup Final
South Africa	29
Tunisia	5
3rd Place
Uganda	12
Kenya	0

=== Plate final (5th Place Playoff) ===
Zimbabwe	19–0	Senegal
