= Eloise Webb =

South African rugby union and sevens player

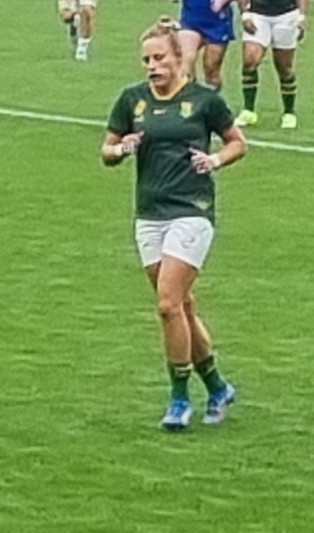
- Born: 5 March 1996 (age 30)
- Height: 165 cm (5 ft 5 in)
- Weight: 64 kg (141 lb; 10 st 1 lb)

Rugby union career
- Position: Centre
Senior career
Years	Team	Apps	(Points)
	Border Ladies		(0)
International career
Years	Team	Apps	(Points)
2019–	South Africa	20	(30)
- Correct as of 14 September 2025
National sevens team
Years	Team		Comps
	South Africa		35 (14 pts)

Eloise Webb (born 5 March 1996) is a South African rugby player. She has represented South Africa internationally in rugby sevens and fifteens.

== Background ==
Webb participated in cricket and javelin at the junior national levels. She also played in the Varsity Sports netball competition. She studied at Nelson Mandela University for a Bachelor of Education degree in Intermediate Phase Teaching.

== Rugby career ==
In 2018, Webb competed for South Africa in the Commonwealth Games in Gold Coast, Queensland. She later featured for South Africa at the Rugby World Cup Sevens in San Francisco. She scored a hat-trick in her international test debut for the Springbok Women against Uganda in the 2019 Rugby Africa Women's Cup.

Webb was named in South Africa's sevens squad for the 2022 sevens season and featured in the France Women's Sevens. She scored a try in the final of the 2022 Africa Women's Sevens and helped her side qualify for the Commonwealth Games in Birmingham.

Webb was selected for the South African squad for the 2022 Rugby World Cup Sevens in Cape Town. She was also named in South Africa's women's fifteens team for the Rugby World Cup in New Zealand.

In September 2024, she made South Africa's fifteens squad for the WXV 2 tournament.

On 9 August 2025, she was named in the Springbok women's squad to the 2025 Women's Rugby World Cup.
