= 2025 World Rugby Sevens Challenger Series – Women's tour =

Rugby sevens competition

2025 World Rugby Sevens Challenger Series
- Women's tour – Series V
- Hosts: South Africa; Poland
- Date: 1 March – 4 May 2025
- Nations: 12

The 2025 World Rugby Sevens Challenger Series for women's rugby sevens teams is the fifth season of the second-tier World Rugby Sevens Challenger Series that allows a promotion pathway to the top-level SVNS.

The men's challenger tour with 12 national teams competing and will be played at same venues as their women's counterparts in Cape Town and Kraków. The top four team gain entry to the 2025 Los Angeles 2024–25 SVNS core team qualifier.

== Teams ==
There are 12 women's national teams competing in the Challenger Series for 2025.

Date qualified	Means of qualification	Nation
27 October 2024	2024 Sudamérica Rugby Women's Sevens	Argentina
27 October 2024	2024 Sudamérica Rugby Women's Sevens	Colombia
30 June 2024	2024 Rugby Europe Women's Sevens Championship Series	Belgium
30 June 2024	2024 Rugby Europe Women's Sevens Championship Series	Poland
30 June 2024	2024 Rugby Europe Women's Sevens Championship Series	Czech Republic
24 November 2024	2024 RAN Women's Sevens	Mexico
10 November 2024	2024 Africa Women's Sevens	South Africa
10 November 2024	2024 Africa Women's Sevens	Kenya
10 November 2024	2024 Africa Women's Sevens	Uganda
10 November 2024	2024 Asia Rugby Women's Sevens Series	Hong Kong
10 November 2024	2024 Asia Rugby Women's Sevens Series	Thailand
8 December 2024	2024 Oceania Women's Sevens Championship	Samoa
Totals	6	12

== Schedule ==
The official schedule for the 2025 World Rugby Sevens Challenger Series is:

2025 Itinerary
Leg	City	Stadium	Dates	Winner
1	Cape Town	Cape Town Stadium	1–2 March	Kenya
2	Cape Town	Cape Town Stadium	7–8 March	Kenya
3	Kraków	Henryk Reyman Municipal Stadium	11–12 April	South Africa

== Standings ==
2025 World Rugby Sevens Challenger – Women's Series V
Pos	Event Team	Cape Town	Cape Town	Kraków	Total points
1	Kenya	20	20	16	56
2	South Africa	16	18	20	54
3	Argentina	18	12	18	48
4	Colombia	14	16	10	40
5	Thailand	12	10	14	36
6	Czechia	8	14	8	30
7	Poland	10	6	6	22
8	Belgium	4	4	12	20
9	Uganda	6	8		14
10	Hong Kong China	3	3	0	6
11	Samoa	2	2	0	4
12	Mexico	1	1	0	2

Legend
Green	Qualified for Core Team Qualifier
Light Green	Qualified for Final Stage

== Cape Town 1 ==
=== Pool stage ===
The first event of the series took place on March 1st and 2nd, 2025 at Cape Town Stadium in Cape Town, South Africa.

== Cape Town 2 ==
=== Pool stage ===
The second event of the series took place on March 7th and 8th at Cape Town Stadium in Cape Town, South Africa.

== Kraków ==
=== Pool stage ===
The third event of the series will take place in Kraków, Poland.

The top eight placed women's teams will progress to the third round in Kraków.

Top four ranked women's teams at end of third round will qualify for SVNS Play Off in Los Angeles on 3–4 May 2025.

== See also ==
- 2025 World Rugby Sevens Challenger Series – Men's tour
