= 2024 Africa Women's Sevens =

Rugby tournament

- Hosts: Ghana
- Date: 9–10 November 2024
- Nations: 12

Final positions
- Champions: South Africa
- Runners-up: Kenya
- Third: Uganda

Series details
- Matches played: 34

The 2024 Africa Women's Sevens was the 12th edition of the Africa Women's Sevens, an annual African rugby sevens tournament. The event took place at the Legon Sports Stadium, Accra, Ghana between 9 and 10 November 2024.The top three teams qualified for the 2025 Challenger Series.

A total of twelve teams participated.

== Teams ==
The following teams competed in the 2024 Africa Women's Sevens:

- Burkina Faso
- Ivory Coast
- Ghana
- Kenya
- Madagascar
- Mauritius
- Senegal
- South Africa
- Tunisia
- Uganda
- Zambia
- Zimbabwe

== Pool stage ==
=== Pool A ===
| Pos | Team | Pld | W | D | L | PF | PA | PD | Pts |
|---|---|---|---|---|---|---|---|---|---|
| 1 | South Africa | 3 | 3 | 0 | 0 | 114 | 0 | +114 | 9 |
| 2 | Tunisia | 3 | 2 | 0 | 1 | 57 | 40 | +17 | 7 |
| 3 | Zimbabwe | 3 | 1 | 0 | 2 | 38 | 46 | −8 | 5 |
| 4 | Burkina Faso | 3 | 0 | 0 | 3 | 0 | 120 | −120 | 3 |

Rules for classification: 1) Points; 2) Head-to-head result; 3) Point difference; 4) Points scored.

9 November
10:28

| Tunisia | 10–0 | Zimbabwe |

9 November
10:50

| South Africa | 38–0 | Burkina Faso |

9 November
13:12

| Tunisia | 47–0 | Burkina Faso |

9 November
13:34

| South Africa | 36–0 | Zimbabwe |

9 November
15:56

| Zimbabwe | 38–0 | Burkina Faso |

9 November
16:18

| South Africa | 40–0 | Tunisia |

=== Pool B ===
| Pos | Team | Pld | W | D | L | PF | PA | PD | Pts |
|---|---|---|---|---|---|---|---|---|---|
| 1 | Kenya | 3 | 3 | 0 | 0 | 93 | 22 | +71 | 9 |
| 2 | Madagascar | 3 | 2 | 0 | 1 | 90 | 41 | +49 | 7 |
| 3 | Ghana (H) | 3 | 1 | 0 | 2 | 46 | 51 | −5 | 5 |
| 4 | Mauritius | 3 | 0 | 0 | 3 | 17 | 132 | −115 | 3 |

Rules for classification: 1) Points; 2) Head-to-head result; 3) Point difference; 4) Points scored.
(H) Hosts

9 November
09:44

| Madagascar | 31–12 | Ghana |

9 November
10:06

| Kenya | 61–0 | Mauritius |

9 November
12:28

| Madagascar | 42–7 | Mauritius |

9 November
12:50

| Kenya | 10–5 | Ghana |

9 November
15:34

| Kenya | 22–17 | Madagascar |

9 November
16:40

| Ghana | 29–10 | Mauritius |

=== Pool C ===
| Pos | Team | Pld | W | D | L | PF | PA | PD | Pts |
|---|---|---|---|---|---|---|---|---|---|
| 1 | Uganda | 3 | 3 | 0 | 0 | 118 | 7 | +111 | 9 |
| 2 | Zambia | 3 | 2 | 0 | 1 | 60 | 43 | +17 | 7 |
| 3 | Senegal | 3 | 1 | 0 | 2 | 27 | 59 | −32 | 5 |
| 4 | Ivory Coast | 3 | 0 | 0 | 3 | 17 | 113 | −96 | 3 |

Rules for classification: 1) Points; 2) Head-to-head result; 3) Point difference; 4) Points scored.

9 November
09:00

| Zambia | 10–5 | Senegal |

9 November
09:22

| Uganda | 48–0 | Ivory Coast |

9 November
11:44

| Zambia | 43–7 | Ivory Coast |

9 November
12:06

| Uganda | 39–0 | Senegal |

9 November
14:50

| Senegal | 22–10 | Ivory Coast |

9 November
15:12

| Uganda | 31–7 | Zambia |

== Knockout stage ==
=== 9th to 12th playoffs ===
9th place semifinals
10 November 2024
Zimbabwe | 22
Burkina Faso | 5
10 November 2024
Ivory Coast | 10
Mauritius | 17

9th place final
10 November 2024
Zimbabwe | 17
Mauritius | 5
11th place final
10 November 2024
Burkina Faso | 0
Ivory Coast | 17

=== 5th to 8th playoffs ===
5th place semifinals
10 November 2024
Ghana | 7
Tunisia | 17
10 November 2024
Zambia | 31
Senegal | 7

5th place final
10 November 2024
Tunisia | 12
Zambia | 5
7th place final
10 November 2024
Ghana | 15
Senegal | 0

=== Cup ===
Quarterfinals
10 November 2024
Kenya | 48
Ghana | 0
10 November 2024
Uganda | 17
Tunisia | 12
10 November 2024
Madagascar | 19
Zambia | 12
10 November 2024
South Africa | 50
Senegal | 0

Semifinals
10 November 2024
Kenya | 19
Uganda | 0
10 November 2024
Madagascar | 0
South Africa | 42

Final
10 November 2024
Kenya | 10
South Africa | 17
3rd place final
10 November 2024
Uganda | 17
Madagascar | 5

== Final standings ==
Legend
| Green fill | Qualified for the 2025 World Challenger Series |

| Pos | Team |
|---|---|
| 1 | South Africa |
| 2 | Kenya |
| 3 | Uganda |
| 4 | Madagascar |
| 5 | Tunisia |
| 6 | Zambia |
| 7 | Ghana |
| 8 | Senegal |
| 9 | Zimbabwe |
| 10 | Mauritius |
| 11 | Ivory Coast |
| 12 | Burkina Faso |
