= 2025 Africa Women's Sevens =

Rugby tournament

- Hosts: Kenya
- Date: 15–16 November 2025
- Nations: 12

Final positions
- Champions: South Africa
- Runners-up: Kenya
- Third: Uganda

Series details
- Matches played: 34

The 2025 Africa Women's Sevens is the 13th edition of the Africa Women's Sevens, an annual African rugby sevens tournament. The event took place at the RFUEA Ground, Nairobi, Kenya between 15 and 16 November 2025.The top one teams qualified for the SVNS 3.

A total of twelve teams participated.

== Teams ==
The following teams competed in the 2025 Africa Women's Sevens:

- Burkina Faso
- Ivory Coast
- Egypt
- Ghana
- Kenya
- Madagascar
- Mauritius
- South Africa
- Tunisia
- Uganda
- Zambia
- Zimbabwe

== Pool stage ==
=== Pool A ===
Pos	Team	Pld	W	D	L	PF	PA	PD	Pts
1	South Africa	2	2	0	0	113	0	+113	6
2	Zimbabwe	2	1	0	1	29	50	−21	4
3	Mauritius	2	0	0	2	5	97	−92	2

Rules for classification: 1) Points; 2) Head-to-head result; 3) Point difference; 4) Points scored.

15 November
10:06

Zimbabwe	29–7	Mauritius

15 November
13:06

South Africa	68–0	Mauritius
	Report

15 November
15:44

South Africa	45–0	Zimbabwe
	Report

=== Pool B ===
Pos	Team	Pld	W	D	L	PF	PA	PD	Pts
1	Kenya (H)	2	2	0	0	81	0	+81	6
2	Ghana	2	1	0	1	57	37	+20	4
3	Ivory Coast	2	0	0	2	0	101	−101	2

Rules for classification: 1) Points; 2) Head-to-head result; 3) Point difference; 4) Points scored.
(H) Hosts

15 November
09:44

Ghana	57–0	Ivory Coast

15 November
12:44

Kenya	44–0	Ivory Coast

15 November
16:06

Kenya	36–0	Ghana

=== Pool C ===
Pos	Team	Pld	W	D	L	PF	PA	PD	Pts
1	Uganda	2	2	0	0	70	14	+56	6
2	Zambia	2	1	0	1	66	20	+46	4
3	Burkina Faso	2	0	0	2	0	102	−102	2

Rules for classification: 1) Points; 2) Head-to-head result; 3) Point difference; 4) Points scored.

15 November
09:22

Zambia	52–0	Burkina Faso

15 November
12:22

Uganda	50–0	Burkina Faso

15 November
15:22

Uganda	20–14	Zambia

=== Pool D ===
Pos	Team	Pld	W	D	L	PF	PA	PD	Pts
1	Madagascar	2	2	0	0	52	19	+33	6
2	Tunisia	2	1	0	1	36	21	+15	4
3	Egypt	2	0	0	2	5	53	−48	2

Rules for classification: 1) Points; 2) Head-to-head result; 3) Point difference; 4) Points scored.

15 November
09:00

Tunisia	22–0	Egypt

15 November
12:00

Madagascar	31–5	Egypt

15 November
15:00

Madagascar	21–14	Tunisia

== Knockout stage ==
=== 9th to 12th playoffs ===
9th place semifinals
16 November 2025
Mauritius	22
Egypt	7
16 November 2025
Ivory Coast	5
Burkina Faso (a.e.t.)	10

9th place final
16 November 2025
Mauritius	34
Burkina Faso	0
11th place final
16 November 2025
Egypt	12
Ivory Coast	5

=== 5th to 8th playoffs ===
5th place semifinals
16 November 2025
Ghana	0
Zambia	7
16 November 2025
Tunisia	22
Zimbabwe	0

5th place final
16 November 2025
Zambia	14
Tunisia	19
7th place final
16 November 2025
Ghana	12
Zimbabwe	19

=== Cup ===
Quarterfinals
16 November 2025
South Africa	48
Ghana	0
16 November 2025
Madagascar	17
Zambia	7
16 November 2025
Uganda	31
Tunisia	12
16 November 2025
Kenya	33
Zimbabwe	12

Semifinals
16 November 2025
South Africa	29
Madagascar	0
16 November 2025
Uganda	10
Kenya	17

Final
16 November 2025
South Africa	22
Kenya	0
3rd place final
16 November 2025
Madagascar	12
Uganda	38

=== Final standings ===
Pos	Team	Qualification
1	South Africa	SVNS 3
2	Kenya (H)	
3	Uganda	
4	Madagascar	
5	Tunisia	
6	Zambia	
7	Zimbabwe	
8	Ghana	
9	Mauritius	
10	Burkina Faso	
11	Egypt	
12	Ivory Coast	

Source: Rugby Afrique
(H) Host
