= 2006 CAR Women's Sevens =

- Hosts: Uganda
- Date: 24 June 2006
- Nations: 8

Final positions
- Champions: South Africa
- Runners-up: Uganda
- Third: Zambia

Series details
- Matches played: 18

The 2006 CAR Women's Sevens was a regional tournament that was held at the Kyadondo Rugby Club in Kampala, Uganda, on 24 June 2006. South Africa Emerging beat Uganda in the Cup final to win the tournament.

== Teams ==
Eight teams competed in the tournament.

- Burundi
- Kenya
- Rwanda
- South Africa Emerging
- Uganda
- Uganda Select
- Zambia
- Zimbabwe

== Pool stages ==
=== Pool One ===
Nation	Won	Drawn	Lost	For	Against
South Africa Emerging	3	0	0	62	5
Kenya	2	0	1	55	14
Zambia	1	0	2	21	48
Uganda Select	0	0	3	5	76

South Africa Emerging	26–0	Zambia

Kyadondo Rugby Club

Kenya	33–0	Uganda Select

Kyadondo Rugby Club

South Africa Emerging	22–5	Uganda Select

Kyadondo Rugby Club

Kenya	22–0	Zambia

Kyadondo Rugby Club

Zambia	21–0	Uganda Select

Kyadondo Rugby Club

South Africa Emerging	14–0	Kenya

Kyadondo Rugby Club

=== Pool Two ===
Nation	Won	Drawn	Lost	For	Against
Uganda	3	0	0	134	5
Rwanda	2	0	1	71	24
Zimbabwe	1	0	2	15	79
Burundi	0	0	3	0	112

Uganda	24–5	Rwanda

Kyadondo Rugby Club

Zimbabwe	15–0	Burundi

Kyadondo Rugby Club

Uganda	56–0	Burundi

Kyadondo Rugby Club

Zimbabwe	0–25	Rwanda

Kyadondo Rugby Club

Rwanda	41–0	Burundi

Kyadondo Rugby Club

Uganda	54–0	Zimbabwe

Kyadondo Rugby Club

== Classification stages ==
=== Semi-finals Plate ===
Semi-finals
Zambia	55
Burundi	0
Uganda Select	22
Zimbabwe	0

Plate Final
Zambia	33
Uganda Select	0

=== Semi-finals Cup ===
Semi-finals
South Africa Emerging	48
Rwanda	0
Uganda	22
Kenya	17

Cup Final
South Africa Emerging	15
Uganda	7
