= 2022 Africa Women's Sevens =

- Hosts: Tunisia
- Date: 29–30 April 2022
- Nations: 9

Final positions
- Champions: South Africa
- Runners-up: Madagascar
- Third: Tunisia

Series details
- Matches played: 21

The 2022 Africa Women's Sevens are an annual African rugby sevens tournament that took place at the Stade Municipal de Jemmal in Jemmal on 29 and 30 April 2022; they were held in Tunisia for the fourth time.

Nine teams participated in the tournament, including 2019 champions South Africa (who successfully defended their title and qualified for the 2022 Commonwealth Games in Birmingham). Since South Africa already qualify for the 2022 Rugby World Cup Sevens as hosts, Madagascar secured the World Cup ticket to Cape Town by finishing as runners-up.

== Format ==
Teams are divided into three pools, in which they each play two matches. Based on their pool positions and points differences, the lowest-ranked team overall is eliminated and the remaining teams seeded in the knockout-stage Cup quarter-finals.

Quarter-final winners advance to the Cup semi-finals (and final / third-place match beyond those), whilst the losers contest the lower-classification Plate matches.

== Qualifications ==
Kenya, Madagascar, South Africa, Tunisia, Uganda qualified automatically for the final tournament.

=== 2021 Northern Africa Women's Regional 7s ===
The tournament was held in Alexandria, Egypt.

Pool stage

Team	Pld	W	D	L	PF	PA	PD	Pts
Senegal	2	2	0	0	51	12	+39	6
Algeria	2	1	0	1	35	36	-1	4
Egypt	2	0	0	2	19	57	-38	2

17 December 2021	Egypt	14–28	Algeria	Alexandria
--:--

17 December 2021	Senegal	22–7	Algeria	Alexandria
--:--

17 December 2021	Egypt	5–29	Senegal	Alexandria
--:--

Final

18 December 2021	Senegal	19–5	Algeria	Alexandria
--:--

Senegal qualified for the final tournament.

=== 2021 Western Africa Women's Regional 7s ===
The tournament was held in Kumasi, Ghana.

Team	Pld	W	D	L	PF	PA	PD	Pts
Ghana	4	4	0	0	140	29	+111	12
Ivory Coast	4	2	0	2	61	48	+13	8
Burkina Faso	4	2	0	2	56	36	+20	8
Benin	4	2	0	2	31	70	-39	8
Togo	4	0	0	4	5	110	-105	4

27 November 2021	Ghana	51–0	Togo	Kumasi
--:--

27 November 2021	Ivory Coast	12–19	Benin	Kumasi
--:--

27 November 2021	Burkina Faso	12–0	Benin	Kumasi
--:--

27 November 2021	Ivory Coast	20–0	Togo	Kumasi
--:--

27 November 2021	Ghana	19–17	Burkina Faso	Kumasi
--:--

28 November 2021	Ghana	41–0	Benin	Kumasi
--:--

28 November 2021	Ivory Coast	17–0	Burkina Faso	Kumasi
--:--

28 November 2021	Benin	12–5	Togo	Kumasi
--:--

28 November 2021	Burkina Faso	27–0	Togo	Kumasi
--:--

28 November 2021	Ghana	29–12	Ivory Coast	Kumasi
--:--

Ghana qualified for the final tournament.

=== 2022 Central Africa Women's Regional 7s ===
The tournament was held in Bujumbura, Burundi.

Team	Pld	W	D	L	PF	PA	PD	Pts
Zambia	3	3	0	0	130	5	+125	9
Cameroon	3	2	0	1	27	55	-28	7
DR Congo	3	0	1	2	17	62	-45	4
Burundi	3	0	1	2	5	57	-52	4

13 March 2022	DR Congo	0–40	Zambia	Bujumbura
--:--

13 March 2022	Burundi	0–5	Cameroon	Bujumbura
--:--

13 March 2022	Burundi	5–5	DR Congo	Bujumbura
--:--

13 March 2022	Zambia	43–5	Cameroon	Bujumbura
--:--

13 March 2022	DR Congo	12–17	Cameroon	Bujumbura
--:--

13 March 2022	Burundi	0–47	Zambia	Bujumbura
--:--

Zambia qualified for the final tournament.

=== 2022 Southern Africa Women's Regional 7s ===
The tournament was held in Maseru, Lesotho.

Team	Pld	W	D	L	PF	PA	PD	Pts
Zimbabwe	4	4	0	0	165	5	+165	12
Namibia	4	3	0	1	67	64	+3	10
Mauritius	4	2	0	2	62	54	+8	8
Botswana	4	1	0	3	52	77	-25	6
Lesotho	4	0	0	4	10	161	-151	4

29 January 2022	Lesotho	0–62	Zimbabwe	Maseru
--:--

29 January 2022	Mauritius	21–12	Botswana	Maseru
--:--

29 January 2022	Zimbabwe	39–0	Namibia	Maseru
--:--

29 January 2022	Lesotho	5–30	Botswana	Maseru
--:--

29 January 2022	Namibia	17–10	Mauritius	Maseru
--:--

29 January 2022	Zimbabwe	39–0	Botswana	Maseru
--:--

30 January 2022	Lesotho	0–31	Mauritius	Maseru
--:--

30 January 2022	Namibia	12–10	Botswana	Maseru
--:--

30 January 2022	Zimbabwe	25–0	Mauritius	Maseru
--:--

30 January 2022	Lesotho	5–38	Namibia	Maseru
--:--

Zimbabwe qualified for the final tournament.

== Qualified teams ==
The following teams participated in the tournament:

- South Africa
- Senegal
- Zimbabwe
- Kenya
- Uganda
- Zambia
- Tunisia
- Madagascar
- Ghana

== Pool stage ==
All times in West Africa Time (UTC+01:00)

=== Pool A ===
Team	Pld	W	D	L	PF	PA	PD	Pts
South Africa	2	2	0	0	68	0	+68	6
Zimbabwe	2	1	0	1	14	27	-13	4
Senegal	2	0	0	2	12	67	-55	2

29 April 2022	Senegal	12–14	Zimbabwe	Stade Municipal de Jemmal
11:00

29 April 2022	South Africa	53–0	Senegal	Stade Municipal de Jemmal
12:28

29 April 2022	Zimbabwe	0–15	South Africa	Stade Municipal de Jemmal
13:56

=== Pool B ===
Team	Pld	W	D	L	PF	PA	PD	Pts
Uganda	2	2	0	0	25	12	+13	6
Kenya	2	1	0	1	29	10	+19	4
Zambia	2	0	0	2	5	37	-32	2

29 April 2022	Zambia	5–15	Uganda	Stade Municipal de Jemmal
11:22

29 April 2022	Kenya	22–0	Zambia	Stade Municipal de Jemmal
12:50

29 April 2022	Uganda	10–7	Kenya	Stade Municipal de Jemmal
14:18

=== Pool C ===
Team	Pld	W	D	L	PF	PA	PD	Pts
Madagascar	2	2	0	0	36	10	+26	6
Tunisia	2	1	0	1	22	12	+10	4
Ghana	2	0	0	2	10	46	-36	2

29 April 2022	Ghana	5–17	Tunisia	Stade Municipal de Jemmal
11:44

29 April 2022	Madagascar	29–5	Ghana	Stade Municipal de Jemmal
13:12

29 April 2022	Tunisia	5–7	Madagascar	Stade Municipal de Jemmal
14:40

== Knockout stage ==
=== Ninth-place elimination ===
Senegal, the lowest-ranked team overall, does not progress to the knockout stage.

=== Plate competition (5th–8th place playoffs) ===
Classification semi-finals
30 April 2022 – Stade Municipal de Jemmal
Ghana	0
Kenya	20
30 April 2022 – Stade Municipal de Jemmal
Zambia	21
Zimbabwe	14

Fifth place
30 April 2022 – Stade Municipal de Jemmal
Kenya	12
Zambia	5
Seventh place
30 April 2022 – Stade Municipal de Jemmal
Ghana	29
Zimbabwe	7

Matches

Classification semi-finals

30 April 2022	Ghana	0–20	Kenya	Stade Municipal de Jemmal
12:28

30 April 2022	Zambia	21–14	Zimbabwe	Stade Municipal de Jemmal
12:50

Seventh-place match

30 April 2022	Ghana	29–7	Zimbabwe	Stade Municipal de Jemmal
14:33

Fifth-place match

30 April 2022	Kenya	12–5	Zambia	Stade Municipal de Jemmal
14:55

=== Cup competition ===
Quarter-finals
30 April 2022 – Stade Municipal de Jemmal
South Africa	17
Ghana	5
30 April 2022 – Stade Municipal de Jemmal
Kenya	5
Tunisia	19
30 April 2022 – Stade Municipal de Jemmal
Madagascar	14
Zambia	10
30 April 2022 – Stade Municipal de Jemmal
Uganda	10
Zimbabwe	0

Semi-finals
30 April 2022 – Stade Municipal de Jemmal
South Africa	31
Tunisia	0
30 April 2022 – Stade Municipal de Jemmal
Madagascar	17 (a.e.t.)
Uganda	12

Final
30 April 2022 – Stade Municipal de Jemmal
South Africa	15
Madagascar	14
Third place
30 April 2022 – Stade Municipal de Jemmal
Tunisia	17
Uganda	15

Matches

Quarter-finals

30 April 2022	South Africa	17–5	Ghana	Stade Municipal de Jemmal
10:03

30 April 2022	Madagascar	14–10	Zambia	Stade Municipal de Jemmal
10:25

30 April 2022	Uganda	10–0	Zimbabwe	Stade Municipal de Jemmal
10:46

30 April 2022	Kenya	5–19	Tunisia	Stade Municipal de Jemmal
11:07

Semi-finals

30 April 2022	South Africa	31–0	Tunisia	Stade Municipal de Jemmal
13:12

30 April 2022	Madagascar	17–12 (a.e.t.)	Uganda	Stade Municipal de Jemmal
13:34

Third-place match

30 April 2022	Tunisia	17–15	Uganda	Stade Municipal de Jemmal
15:17

Final

30 April 2022	South Africa	15–14	Madagascar	Stade Municipal de Jemmal
15:39

== Final standings ==
Legend
Green fill	Qualified for the 2022 Commonwealth Games
Blue bar	Qualified for the 2022 Rugby World Cup Sevens

Pos	Team
1	South Africa (Note: Already qualified for the 2022 Rugby World Cup Sevens as host nation.)
2	Madagascar
3	Tunisia
4	Uganda
5	Kenya
6	Zambia
7	Ghana
8	Zimbabwe
9	Senegal

== See also ==
- 2021–22 World Rugby Women's Sevens Series

Africa Women's Sevens
Preceded by 2019 Monastir	2022 Africa Women's Sevens	Succeeded by
