= 2018 Africa Women's Sevens =

- Hosts: Botswana
- Date: 26–27 May
- Nations: 10

Final positions
- Champions: Kenya
- Runners-up: Uganda
- Third: Tunisia

The 2018 Africa Women's Sevens was a women's rugby sevens tournament held in Gaborone, Botswana on 26–27 May 2018.

Kenya as the highest ranked team qualified for the 2018 Dubai Women's Sevens and 2019 Hong Kong Women's Sevens. Uganda also qualified for 2019 Hong Kong Women's Sevens.

== Teams ==
South Africa was initially scheduled to compete, but pulled out to prepare for the 2018 Rugby World Cup Sevens.

- Botswana
- Kenya
- Madagascar
- Mauritius
- Morocco
- Senegal
- Tunisia
- Uganda
- Zambia
- Zimbabwe

== Pool stage ==
All times in Central Africa Time (UTC+02:00)

Legend
Seeded 1–2 in knockout round
Seeded 3–4 in knockout round
Seeded 5–6 in knockout round

=== Pool A ===
Team	Pld	W	D	L	PF	PA	PD	Pts
Kenya	2	2	0	0	+83	0	+83	6
Madagascar	2	1	0	1	40	42	−2	4
Senegal	2	0	0	2	0	81	−81	2

26 May 2018	Madagascar	40–0	Senegal	Gaborone, Botswana
10:08

26 May 2018	Kenya	41–0	Senegal	Gaborone, Botswana
11:44

26 May 2018	Kenya	42–0	Madagascar	Gaborone, Botswana
13:20

=== Pool B ===
Team	Pld	W	D	L	PF	PA	PD	Pts
Tunisia	2	1	1	0	41	17	+24	5
Uganda	2	1	1	0	30	17	+13	5
Zimbabwe	2	0	0	2	14	51	–37	2

26 May 2018	Uganda	20–7	Zimbabwe	Gaborone, Botswana
10:30

26 May 2018	Tunisia	31–7	Zimbabwe	Gaborone, Botswana
12:06

26 May 2018	Tunisia	10–10	Uganda	Gaborone, Botswana
13:42

=== Pool C ===
Semi-finals
26 May 2018 – 10:52 – Gaborone, Botswana
Morocco	20
Zambia	26
26 May 2018 – 12:28 – Gaborone, Botswana
Botswana	15
Mauritius	10

7th–8th seeding
26 May 2018 – 14:04 – Gaborone, Botswana
Zambia	5
Botswana	5
9th–10th seeding
26 May 2018 – 14:26 – Gaborone, Botswana
Morocco	24
Mauritius	5

26 May 2018	Morocco	20–26	Zambia
10:52

26 May 2018	Botswana	15–10	Mauritius
12:28

26 May 2018	Zambia	5–5	Botswana
14:04

26 May 2018	Morocco	24–5	Mauritius
14:26

== Knockout stage ==
=== Placement Match ===
26 May 2018	Morocco	22–5	Mauritius	Gaborone, Botswana
10:58

=== Fifth Place ===
Semi-finals
27 May 2018 – 11:42 – Gaborone, Botswana
Zambia	15
Zimbabwe	17
27 May 2018 – 12:04 – Gaborone, Botswana
Botswana	10
Senegal	22

Final
27 May 2018 – 14:16 – Gaborone, Botswana
Zimbabwe	19
Senegal	5
Seventh Place
27 May 2018 – 13:54 – Gaborone, Botswana
Zambia	5
Botswana	12

=== Cup ===
Quarter-finals
27 May 2018 – 9:30 – Gaborone, Botswana
Kenya	42
Zambia	5
27 May 2018 – 11:36 – Gaborone, Botswana
Madagascar	24
Zimbabwe	5
27 May 2018 – 9:52 – Gaborone, Botswana
Tunisia	36
Botswana	0
27 May 2018 – 10:14 – Gaborone, Botswana
Uganda	12
Senegal	5

Semi-finals
27 May 2018 – 12:26 – Gaborone, Botswana
Kenya	27
Madagascar	0
27 May 2018 – 12:48 – Gaborone, Botswana
Tunisia	5
Uganda	10

Final
27 May 2018 – 15:22 – Gaborone, Botswana
Kenya	29
Uganda	7
Third place
27 May 2018 – 14:38 – Gaborone, Botswana
Madagascar	7
Tunisia	22

== Standings ==
Legend
Qualified to 2019 Hong Kong Women's Sevens

Rank	Team
1st place, gold medalist(s)	Kenya
2nd place, silver medalist(s)	Uganda
3rd place, bronze medalist(s)	Tunisia
4	Madagascar
5	Zimbabwe
6	Senegal
7	Botswana
8	Zambia
9	Morocco
10	Mauritius

== See also ==
- 2019 Hong Kong Women's Sevens
