= 2023 Africa Women's Sevens =

Rugby tournament

- Hosts: Zambia (Qualifier); Tunisia (Final tournament)
- Date: 1–2 July 2023 (Qualifier); 14–15 October 2023 (Final tournament)
- Nations: 10 (Qualifier); 8 (Final tournament)

Final positions
- Champions: South Africa
- Runners-up: Kenya
- Third: Uganda

The 2023 Africa Women's Sevens was the 11th edition of the Africa Women's Sevens, an annual African rugby sevens tournament. The qualifier event took place at the Lusaka Rugby Club, Zambia between 1 and 2 July 2023. The main event took place in Tunisia. The winner qualified for the 2024 Olympics in Paris, and the second and third placed teams qualified for the 2024 Final Olympic Qualification Tournament. In addition, the top two teams qualified for the 2024 Challenger Series.

A total of fifteen teams participated.

== Format ==
Teams are seeded according to their performances in the previous championship. The top five teams from the previous championship entered the main tournament, while the remaining ten entered the qualifier.

== Teams ==
The following teams entered the qualification tournament:

- Algeria
- Burkina Faso
- DR Congo
- Egypt
- Ghana
- Ivory Coast
- Mauritius
- Senegal
- Zambia
- Zimbabwe

The following teams entered the main tournament:

- Kenya
- Madagascar
- South Africa
- Tunisia
- Uganda
- Zambia
- Ghana
- Zimbabwe

== Qualifier event ==
=== Pool stage ===
Legend
Advanced to quarter finals

Pool A

| Team | Pld | W | D | L | PF | PA | PD | Pts |
|---|---|---|---|---|---|---|---|---|
| Zambia | 3 | 3 | 0 | 0 | 100 | 15 | +85 | 9 |
| Senegal | 3 | 2 | 0 | 1 | 55 | 48 | +7 | 7 |
| Mauritius | 2 | 1 | 0 | 1 | 19 | 36 | -17 | 4 |
| Algeria | 2 | 0 | 0 | 2 | 10 | 61 | -51 | 2 |
| Egypt | 2 | 0 | 0 | 2 | 19 | 43 | -24 | 2 |

| Zambia | 35–10 | Algeria |

| Senegal | 24–19 | Egypt |

| Zambia | 36–0 | Mauritius |

| Senegal | 26–0 | Algeria |

| Egypt | 0–19 | Mauritius |

| Zambia | 29–5 | Senegal |

| Egypt | v | Algeria |

| Senegal | v | Mauritius |

| Zambia | v | Egypt |

| Mauritius | v | Algeria |

Pool B

| Team | Pld | W | D | L | PF | PA | PD | Pts |
|---|---|---|---|---|---|---|---|---|
| Zimbabwe | 0 | 0 | 0 | 0 | 0 | 0 | 0 | 0 |
| Ghana | 0 | 0 | 0 | 0 | 0 | 0 | 0 | 0 |
| Ivory Coast | 0 | 0 | 0 | 0 | 0 | 0 | 0 | 0 |
| DR Congo | 0 | 0 | 0 | 0 | 0 | 0 | 0 | 0 |
| Burkina Faso | 0 | 0 | 0 | 0 | 0 | 0 | 0 | 0 |

| Ghana | 24–12 | Ivory Coast |

| Zimbabwe | v | DR Congo |

| Ghana | 24–0 | Burkina Faso |

| Zimbabwe | 43–0 | Ivory Coast |

| DR Congo | 12–19 | Burkina Faso |

| Ghana | 19–15 | Zimbabwe |

| DR Congo | v | Ivory Coast |

| Zimbabwe | v | Burkina Faso |

| Ghana | v | DR Congo |

| Burkina Faso | v | Ivory Coast |

=== Knockout stage ===
9th place

| Egypt | 46–0 | DR Congo |

5th place

Semi-finals
[[ women's national rugby sevens team|]]
[[ women's national rugby sevens team|]]
[[ women's national rugby sevens team|]]
[[ women's national rugby sevens team|]]

Fifth place
Algeria | 0
Ivory Coast | 19
Seventh place
Mauritius | 24
Burkina Faso | 12

Cup

Quarter-finals
[[ women's national rugby sevens team|]]
[[ women's national rugby sevens team|]]
[[ women's national rugby sevens team|]]
[[ women's national rugby sevens team|]]
[[ women's national rugby sevens team|]]
[[ women's national rugby sevens team|]]
[[ women's national rugby sevens team|]]
[[ women's national rugby sevens team|]]

Semi-finals
[[ women's national rugby sevens team|]]
[[ women's national rugby sevens team|]]
[[ women's national rugby sevens team|]]
[[ women's national rugby sevens team|]]

Final
Zambia | 26
Ghana | 5
Third place
Senegal | 7
Zimbabwe | 10

=== Standings ===
Legend
| Qualified for Main Tournament |

| Rank | Team |
|---|---|
| 1 | Zambia |
| 2 | Ghana |
| 3 | Zimbabwe |
| 4 | Senegal |
| 5 | Ivory Coast |
| 6 | Algeria |
| 7 | Mauritius |
| 8 | Burkina Faso |
| 9 | Egypt |
| 10 | DR Congo |

== Final tournament ==
=== Pool stage ===
Legend
Advanced to semi finals

Pool A

| Team | Pld | W | D | L | PF | PA | PD | Pts |
|---|---|---|---|---|---|---|---|---|
| South Africa | 3 | 3 | 0 | 0 | 72 | 12 | +60 | 9 |
| Uganda | 3 | 2 | 0 | 1 | 34 | 24 | +10 | 7 |
| Tunisia | 3 | 1 | 0 | 2 | 38 | 44 | –6 | 5 |
| Zimbabwe | 3 | 0 | 0 | 3 | 10 | 74 | –64 | 3 |

| 14 October | Tunisia | 5–12 | Uganda |
| 09:00 |

| 14 October | South Africa | 26–5 | Zimbabwe |
| 09:22 |

| 14 October | Tunisia | 26–5 | Zimbabwe |
| 11:22 |

| 14 October | South Africa | 19–0 | Uganda |
| 12:06 |

| 14 October | Uganda | 22–0 | Zimbabwe |
| 14:56 |

| 14 October | South Africa | 27–7 | Tunisia |
| 16:02 |

Pool B

| Team | Pld | W | D | L | PF | PA | PD | Pts |
|---|---|---|---|---|---|---|---|---|
| Kenya | 3 | 3 | 0 | 0 | 89 | 17 | +72 | 9 |
| Zambia | 3 | 2 | 0 | 1 | 32 | 52 | –20 | 7 |
| Madagascar | 3 | 1 | 0 | 2 | 66 | 47 | +19 | 5 |
| Ghana | 3 | 0 | 0 | 3 | 20 | 91 | –71 | 3 |

| 14 October | Kenya | 27–0 | Zambia |
| 09:44 |

| 14 October | Madagascar | 34–10 | Ghana |
| 10:06 |

| 14 October | Kenya | 42–0 | Ghana |
| 12:28 |

| 14 October | Madagascar | 15–17 | Zambia |
| 12:50 |

| 14 October | Zambia | 15–10 | Ghana |
| 15:18 |

| 14 October | Madagascar | 17–20 | Kenya |
| 15:40 |

==== Knockout stage ====
5th place

Semi-finals
Tunisia | 24
Ghana | 5
Madagascar | 15
Zimbabwe | 10

Fifth place
Tunisia | 5
Madagascar | 25
Seventh place
Ghana | 0
Zimbabwe | 10

Cup

Semi-finals
South Africa | 31
Zambia | 0
Kenya | 27
Uganda | 0

Final
South Africa | 12
Kenya | 7
Third place
Zambia | 10
Uganda | 29

==== Standings ====
Legend
Qualified for 2024 Summer Olympics
Qualified for Olympic Repechage

| Rank | Team |
|---|---|
| 1st place, gold medalist(s) | South Africa |
| 2nd place, silver medalist(s) | Kenya |
| 3rd place, bronze medalist(s) | Uganda |
| 4 | Zambia |
| 5 | Madagascar |
| 6 | Tunisia |
| 7 | Zimbabwe |
| 8 | Ghana |
