= Rugby sevens at the 2023 African Games – Women's tournament =

African Games Rugby event

Women's rugby sevens at the 2023 African Games
- Venue: UoG rugby stadium
- Date: 20–21 March 2024
- Teams: 5

Medalists
gold medal	Uganda
silver medal	Madagascar
bronze medal	Tunisia

The women's tournament of rugby sevens at the 2023 African Games is being held at the UoG rugby stadium, Accra, Ghana from 20 to 21 March 2024.

== Schedule ==
G	Group stage

Date Event
Date Event	19 Tue	20 Wed	21 Thu
Women		G	G

== Participating nations ==
5 teams were scheduled to compete in rugby.

- Ghana
- Madagascar
- Nigeria
- Tunisia
- Uganda

== Results ==
20 March 2024
9:00

Ghana	12–5	Nigeria
	Report

UoG rugby stadium, Accra

20 March 2024
9:22

Uganda	37–7	Tunisia
	Report

UoG rugby stadium, Accra

20 March 2024
11:30

Uganda	50–7	Ghana
	Report

UoG rugby stadium, Accra

20 March 2024
11:52

Madagascar	20–5	Nigeria
	Report

UoG rugby stadium, Accra

21 March 2024
9:22

Tunisia	17–7	Nigeria
	Report

UoG rugby stadium, Accra

21 March 2024
9:44

Madagascar	10–15	Ghana
	Report

UoG rugby stadium, Accra

21 March 2024
11:44

Uganda	33–12	Nigeria
	Report

UoG rugby stadium, Accra

21 March 2024
12:06

Madagascar	26–10	Tunisia
	Report

UoG rugby stadium, Accra

21 March 2024
14:28

Tunisia	20–7	Ghana
	Report

UoG rugby stadium, Accra

21 March 2024
14:50

Uganda	29–0	Madagascar
	Report

UoG rugby stadium, Accra

== Final ranking ==
Pos	Team	Pld	W	D	L	PF	PA	PD	Pts	Results
1	Uganda	4	4	0	0	149	26	+123	12	Gold medalists
2	Madagascar	4	2	0	2	56	59	−3	8	Silver medalists
3	Tunisia	4	2	0	2	54	77	−23	8	Bronze medalists
4	Ghana (H)	4	2	0	2	41	85	−44	8	
5	Nigeria	4	0	0	4	29	82	−53	4	

Source: results.accra2023ag.com
(H) Hosts
