= 2015 Women's Africa Cup Sevens =

- Hosts: South Africa
- Date: 26–27 September
- Nations: 10 teams

Final positions
- Champions: South Africa
- Runners-up: Kenya
- Third: Tunisia

The 2015 Women's Africa Cup Sevens was a women's rugby sevens tournament for the continental championship of Africa and a qualification tournament for rugby sevens at the 2016 Summer Olympics. The competition was held in Kempton Park, South Africa on 26–27 September 2015. It was the fifth all-continental African Women's Sevens Championship, hosting teams from both Northern and Southern Africa.

South Africa, as the tournament winner, qualified directly for the Olympic Games but their National Olympic Committee decided not to send a team so the runner-up, Kenya, took their place. The next three place-getters, Tunisia, Zimbabwe and Tunisia progressed to the final qualifying competition to play-off for inclusion in the 2016 Games.

== Teams ==
- Botswana
- Kenya
- Morocco
- Namibia
- Senegal
- South Africa
- Tunisia
- Uganda
- Zambia
- Zimbabwe

== Pool Stage ==
=== Pool A ===
Teams	Pld	W	D	L	PF	PA	+/−	Pts
South Africa	4	4	0	0	189	0	+189	9
Zimbabwe	4	3	0	1	89	50	+39	9
Uganda	4	2	0	2	58	75	-17	6
Namibia	4	1	0	3	34	119	−85	3
Zambia	4	0	0	4	10	145	−135	0

- South Africa 57-0 Zambia
- Zimbabwe 19-5 Uganda
- South Africa 60-0 Namibia
- Zimbabwe 37-0 Zambia
- Uganda 17-7 Namibia
- South Africa 33-0 Zimbabwe
- Uganda 36-0 Zambia
- Zimbabwe 33-12 Namibia
- South Africa 39-0 Uganda
- Namibia 15-10 Zambia

=== Pool B ===
Ranking	Nation	Won	Drawn	Lost	For	Against	Points
1	Kenya	4	0	0	148	14	12
2	Tunisia	3	0	1	111	31	10
3	Madagascar	2	0	2	72	57	8
4	Senegal	1	0	3	37	106	6
5	Botswana	0	0	4	14	168	4

- Kenya 46-7 Botswana
- Tunisia 15-12 Madagascar
- Kenya 52-0 Senegal
- Tunisia 47-0 Botswana
- Madagascar 14-5 Senegal
- Kenya 19 -7 Tunisia
- Madagascar 43-7 Botswana
- Tunisia 40-0 Senegal
- Kenya 33-0 Madagascar
- Senegal 32-0 Botswana

== Placement Stage ==
Bowl (9th/10th Place)

- Zambia 5-12 Botswana

Plate (5th/8th Place)

Semi-finals

- Uganda 10-15 Senegal (After Extra Time)
- Namibia 0-43 Madagascar

7th/8th Place

- Uganda 28-0 Namibia

Plate Final (5th/6th Place)

- Senegal 0-15 Madagascar

Cup (1st/4th Place)

Semi-finals

- South Africa 34-0 Tunisia
- Zimbabwe 0-39 Kenya

3rd/4th Place

- Zimbabwe 0-33 Tunisia

Final

- South Africa 31-5 Kenya

== Final standings ==
Legend
Qualified for the 2016 Summer Olympics.
Qualified for the Final 2016 Women's Olympic Qualification Tournament.

Rank	Team
1st place, gold medalist(s)	South Africa
2nd place, silver medalist(s)	Kenya
3rd place, bronze medalist(s)	Tunisia
4	Zimbabwe
5	Madagascar
6	Senegal
7	Uganda
8	Namibia
9	Botswana
10	Zambia

South Africa will not participate in the 2016 Olympics. Previously SASCOC chief executive Tubby Reddy had stated that winning the continental qualifier would not be enough. Kenya, as the second-placed team in the African qualifiers, advance to the Olympics. Madagascar, the fifth-place finisher in qualifying, was named as a replacement.

== See also ==
- 2015 Rugby Africa Men's Sevens Championships
