= Aberdeen Shikoyi =

- Born: 1985
- Died: 28 April 2012 (aged 27) Nairobi

Rugby union career
- Position(s): Flanker and Hooker
Senior career
Years	Team	Apps	(Points)
- Mwamba RFC
International career
Years	Team	Apps	(Points)
- Kenya
National sevens team
Years	Team		Comps
- Kenya

Aberdeen Shikoyi (1985 – 28 April 2012) was a Kenyan rugby union player. She was the captain of the women's rugby union team.

In 2012, Shikoyi sustained a spinal injury during a rugby match and died a few days later.
