= 2016 Women's Africa Cup Sevens =

- Hosts: Zimbabwe
- Date: 17–18 September
- Nations: 8

Final positions
- Champions: South Africa
- Runners-up: Kenya

The 2016 Women's Africa Cup Sevens was a women's rugby sevens tournament held in Harare, Zimbabwe on 17–18 September 2016.

== Teams ==
- Kenya
- Madagascar
- Namibia
- Senegal
- South Africa
- Tunisia
- Uganda
- Zimbabwe

== Pool stage ==
Key to colours in group tables
Teams that advanced to the Cup Semifinal

=== Pool A ===
Team	Pld	W	D	L	PF	PA	PD	Pts
South Africa	3	3	0	0	108	16	+92	9
Zimbabwe	3	2	0	1	58	24	+34	7
Senegal	3	1	0	2	31	74	–43	5
Namibia	3	0	0	3	7	90	–83	3

17 September 2016
11:00

South Africa	24–7	Zimbabwe

17 September 2016
11:40

Namibia	7–22	Senegal

17 September 2016
12:20

South Africa	45–9	Senegal

17 September 2016
13:00

Namibia	0–29	Zimbabwe

17 September 2016
14:40

South Africa	39–0	Namibia

17 September 2016
15:20

Senegal	0–22	Zimbabwe

=== Pool B ===
Team	Pld	W	D	L	PF	PA	PD	Pts
Kenya	3	3	0	0	91	17	+74	9
Uganda	3	2	0	1	34	58	–24	7
Tunisia	3	1	0	2	43	49	–6	5
Madagascar	3	0	0	3	25	69	–44	3

17 September 2016
11:20

Kenya	17–12	Tunisia

17 September 2016
12:00

Uganda	12–10	Madagascar

17 September 2016
12:40

Kenya	38–0	Madagascar

17 September 2016
14:20

Uganda	17–12	Tunisia

17 September 2016
15:00

Kenya	36–5	Uganda

17 September 2016
15:40

Madagascar	15–19	Tunisia

== Tournament Stage ==
=== 7th Place ===
Final
18 September 2016 – 11:00
Madagascar	15
Namibia	0

=== 5th Place ===
Final
18 September 2016 – 11:25
Tunisia	17
Senegal	7

=== Cup ===
Semi-finals
18 September 2016 – 11:50
South Africa	29
Uganda	5
18 September 2016 – 12:10
Kenya	31
Zimbabwe	5

Final
18 September 2016 – 15:20
South Africa	22
Kenya	17
Third place
18 September 2016 – 14:00
Uganda	10
Zimbabwe	24

=== Rankings ===
Legend
Qualified for 2017 Hong Kong Women's Sevens

Rank	Team
1st place, gold medalist(s)	South Africa
2nd place, silver medalist(s)	Kenya
3rd place, bronze medalist(s)	Zimbabwe
4	Uganda
5	Tunisia
6	Senegal
7	Madagascar
8	Namibia
