= 2017 Women's Africa Cup Sevens =

- Hosts: Tunisia
- Date: 16–17 September
- Nations: 8

Final positions
- Champions: South Africa
- Runners-up: Kenya
- Third: Tunisia

The 2017 Women's Africa Cup Sevens was a women's rugby sevens tournament held in Monastir, Tunisia on 16–17 September 2017. This tournament served as a qualifier for two tournaments, only the winner qualifies for next years 2018 Rugby World Cup Sevens, whereas the top two teams qualify for the 2018 Commonwealth Games which will also be held the following year.

South Africa won the tournament and qualified for the Sevens World Cup and the Commonwealth Games, runner-up, Kenya, qualified for the latter.

== Teams ==
Eight teams competed in the tournament.

- Kenya
- Madagascar
- Morocco
- Senegal
- South Africa
- Tunisia
- Uganda
- Zimbabwe

== Pool stage ==
=== Pool A ===
Team	Pld	W	D	L	PF	PA	PD	Pts
South Africa	3	3	0	0	82	7	+75	9
Tunisia	3	2	0	1	60	32	+28	7
Uganda	3	1	0	2	39	39	0	5
Morocco	3	0	0	3	5	108	–103	3

16 September 2017
10:00

South Africa	41–0	Morocco

16 September 2017
10:22

Uganda	10–15	Tunisia

16 September 2017
11:58

South Africa	17–7	Tunisia

16 September 2017
12:20

Uganda	29–0	Morocco

16 September 2017
13:56

South Africa	24–0	Uganda

16 September 2017
14:18

Tunisia	38–5	Morocco

=== Pool B ===
Team	Pld	W	D	L	PF	PA	PD	Pts
Kenya	3	3	0	0	112	5	+107	9
Madagascar	3	2	0	1	69	44	+25	7
Zimbabwe	3	1	0	2	32	80	–48	5
Senegal	3	0	0	3	5	89	–84	3

16 September 2017
10:44

Kenya	27–5	Madagascar

16 September 2017
11:06

Zimbabwe	15–5	Senegal

16 September 2017
12:42

Kenya	38–0	Senegal

16 September 2017
13:04

Zimbabwe	17–28	Madagascar

16 September 2017
14:40

Kenya	47–0	Zimbabwe

16 September 2017
15:02

Senegal	0–36	Madagascar

== Knockout stage ==
=== Cup ===
Quarter-finals
17 September 2017 – 10:30
Kenya	47
Morocco	0
17 September 2017 – 11:14
Tunisia	24
Zimbabwe	7
17 September 2017 – 10:52
South Africa	43
Senegal	0
17 September 2017 – 11:36
Madagascar	5
Uganda	12

Semi-finals
17 September 2017 – 13:12
Kenya	26
Tunisia	7
17 September 2017– 13:34
South Africa	27
Uganda	0

Final
17 September 2017 – 15:22
Kenya	12
South Africa	17
Third place
17 September 2017– 15:00
Tunisia	14
Uganda	5

=== Fifth Place ===
Semi-finals
17 September 2017 – 12:28
Morocco	7
Senegal	24
17 September 2017– 12:50
Zimbabwe	7
Madagascar	29

Final
17 September 2017 – 14:38
Senegal	5
Madagascar	24
Third place
17 September 2017– 14:16
Morocco	0
Zimbabwe	26

== Standings ==
Legend
Winner qualifies to 2018 Rugby World Cup Sevens
Top two Commonwealth members eligible for 2018 Commonwealth Games

Rank	Team
1st place, gold medalist(s)	South Africa
2nd place, silver medalist(s)	Kenya
3rd place, bronze medalist(s)	Tunisia
4	Uganda
5	Madagascar
6	Senegal
7	Zimbabwe
8	Morocco

== See also ==
- 2018 Rugby World Cup Sevens qualifying – Women
- Rugby sevens at the 2018 Commonwealth Games
- 2017 Africa Cup Sevens (Men)
