= 2024 RAN Women's Sevens =

Rugby tournament

- Hosts: Trinidad and Tobago
- Date: November 22–24; 2024
- Nations: 5

Final positions
- Champions: Mexico
- Runners-up: Jamaica
- Third: Trinidad and Tobago

The 2024 RAN Women's Sevens is a North American rugby sevens tournament that took place at the Larry Gomes Stadium in Trinidad and Tobago from 22 to 24 November 2024. Mexico won the tournament and qualified for the 2025 Challenger Series, and together with runner-up, Jamaica, they qualified their respective U20s teams for the 2025 Junior Pan American Games in Asunción, Paraguay.

== Format ==
Teams will play each other in a round-robin during the pool stage. No extra time is given in the pool stage. The top two sides play in the final, the third and fourth place teams play for Bronze, and the bottom two teams will play for fifth place.

The winner of the tournament will qualify for the 2025 Challenger Series. The top two teams will also qualify their countries for the 2025 Junior Pan Am Games in Paraguay.

== Teams ==
The six teams competing were:

- Barbados
- Dominican Republic
- Jamaica
- Mexico
- Trinidad and Tobago
- Trinidad and Tobago B

== Pool stage ==
All times in Atlantic Time Zone (UTC−04:00)

| Team | Pld | W | D | L | PF | PA | PD | TF | TA | TD | Pts |
|---|---|---|---|---|---|---|---|---|---|---|---|
| Mexico | 5 | 5 | 0 | 0 | 152 | 12 | +140 | 26 | 2 | +24 | 15 |
| Jamaica | 5 | 4 | 0 | 1 | 121 | 46 | +75 | 21 | 8 | +13 | 13 |
| Trinidad and Tobago | 5 | 3 | 0 | 2 | 103 | 34 | +69 | 19 | 6 | +13 | 11 |
| Dominican Republic | 5 | 1 | 0 | 4 | 57 | 94 | –37 | 9 | 16 | –7 | 9 |
| Barbados | 5 | 2 | 0 | 4 | 19 | 115 | –96 | 3 | 19 | –16 | 7 |
| Trinidad and Tobago B | 5 | 0 | 0 | 5 | 12 | 163 | –151 | 2 | 29 | –27 | 5 |

=== Day 1 ===
| November 22 | Trinidad and Tobago | 36–0 | Barbados | Larry Gomes Stadium |

| November 22 | Jamaica | 40–12 | Dominican Republic | Larry Gomes Stadium |

| November 22 | Mexico | 39–0 | Trinidad and Tobago B | Larry Gomes Stadium |

=== Day 2 ===
| November 23 | Dominican Republic | 33–0 | Trinidad and Tobago B | Larry Gomes Stadium |

| November 23 | Jamaica | 12–10 | Trinidad and Tobago | Larry Gomes Stadium |

| November 23 | Mexico | 33–0 | Barbados | Larry Gomes Stadium |

| November 23 | Mexico | 19–12 | Jamaica | Larry Gomes Stadium |

| November 23 | Trinidad and Tobago | 15–0 | Dominican Republic | Larry Gomes Stadium |

| November 23 | Barbados | 14–12 | Trinidad and Tobago B | Larry Gomes Stadium |

| November 23 | Mexico | 22–0 | Trinidad and Tobago | Larry Gomes Stadium |

| November 23 | Barbados | 12–0 | Dominican Republic | Larry Gomes Stadium |

| November 23 | Jamaica | 35–0 | Trinidad and Tobago B | Larry Gomes Stadium |

=== Day 3 ===
| November 24 | Trinidad and Tobago | 42–0 | Trinidad and Tobago B | Larry Gomes Stadium |

| November 24 | Mexico | 39–0 | Dominican Republic | Larry Gomes Stadium |

| November 24 | Jamaica | 22–5 | Barbados | Larry Gomes Stadium |

== Finals ==
=== 5th Place ===
| November 24 | Barbados | 5–22 | Trinidad and Tobago B | Larry Gomes Stadium |

=== Bronze ===
| November 24 | Trinidad and Tobago | 29–0 | Dominican Republic | Larry Gomes Stadium |

=== Cup Final ===
| November 24 | Mexico | 19–12 | Jamaica | Larry Gomes Stadium |

== Standings ==
Legend
Qualified for the 2025 Challenger Series
Qualified for the 2025 Junior Pan Am Games

| Rank | Team |
|---|---|
| 1st place, gold medalist(s) | Mexico |
| 2nd place, silver medalist(s) | Jamaica |
| 3rd place, bronze medalist(s) | Trinidad and Tobago |
| 4 | Dominican Republic |
| 5 | Trinidad and Tobago B |
| 6 | Barbados |
