= Rugby sevens at the 2023 African Games – Men's tournament =

African Games Rugby event

Men's rugby sevens at the 2023 African Games
- Venue: UoG rugby stadium
- Date: 19–21 March 2024
- Teams: 7

Medalists
gold medal	Uganda
silver medal	Zimbabwe
bronze medal	Burkina Faso

The men's tournament of rugby sevens at the 2023 African Games is being held at the UoG rugby stadium, Accra, Ghana from 19 to 21 March 2024.

== Schedule ==
G	Group stage

Date Event
Date Event	19 Tue	20 Wed	21 Thu
Men	G	G	G

== Participating nations ==
7 teams were scheduled to compete in rugby.

- Benin
- Burkina Faso
- Ghana
- Kenya
- Tunisia
- Uganda
- Zimbabwe

== Results ==
19 March 2024
11:00

Kenya	5–10	Burkina Faso
	Report

UoG rugby stadium, Accra

19 March 2024
11:22

Uganda	14–0	Zimbabwe
	Report

UoG rugby stadium, Accra

19 March 2024
11:44

Tunisia	34–0	Benin
	Report

UoG rugby stadium, Accra

19 March 2024
14:00

Kenya	22–27	Zimbabwe
	Report

UoG rugby stadium, Accra

19 March 2024
14:22

Uganda	48–0	Tunisia
	Report

UoG rugby stadium, Accra

19 March 2024
14:44

Ghana	52–0	Benin
	Report

UoG rugby stadium, Accra

20 March 2024
9:44

Tunisia	5–42	Ghana
	Report

UoG rugby stadium, Accra

20 March 2024
10:06

Kenya	55–0	Benin
	Report

UoG rugby stadium, Accra

20 March 2024
10:28

Uganda	24–14	Burkina Faso
	Report

UoG rugby stadium, Accra

20 March 2024
12:50

Uganda	22–5	Ghana
	Report

UoG rugby stadium, Accra

20 March 2024
13:12

Zimbabwe	36–7	Tunisia
	Report

UoG rugby stadium, Accra

20 March 2024
13:34

Burkina Faso	41–0	Benin
	Report

UoG rugby stadium, Accra

21 March 2024
9:00

Burkina Faso	19–0	Ghana
	Report

UoG rugby stadium, Accra

21 March 2024
10:28

Tunisia	7–40	Kenya
	Report

UoG rugby stadium, Accra

21 March 2024
11:00

Uganda	56–0	Benin
	Report

UoG rugby stadium, Accra

21 March 2024
11:22

Zimbabwe	17–21	Ghana
	Report

UoG rugby stadium, Accra

21 March 2024
13:22

Burkina Faso	33–0	Tunisia
	Report

UoG rugby stadium, Accra

21 March 2024
13:44

Kenya	24–5	Ghana
	Report

UoG rugby stadium, Accra

21 March 2024
14:06

Zimbabwe	57–0	Benin
	Report

UoG rugby stadium, Accra

21 March 2024
16:28

Zimbabwe	19–0	Burkina Faso
	Report

UoG rugby stadium, Accra

21 March 2024
16:50

Kenya	14–21	Uganda
	Report

UoG rugby stadium, Accra

== Final ranking ==
Pos	Team	Pld	W	D	L	PF	PA	PD	Pts	Results
1	Uganda	6	6	0	0	185	33	+152	18	Gold medalists
2	Zimbabwe	6	4	0	2	156	64	+92	14	Silver medalists
3	Burkina Faso	6	4	0	2	117	48	+69	14	Bronze medalists
4	Kenya	6	3	0	3	160	70	+90	12	
5	Ghana (H)	6	3	0	3	125	87	+38	12	
6	Tunisia	6	1	0	5	53	199	−146	8	
7	Benin	6	0	0	6	0	295	−295	6	

Source: results.accra2023ag.com
(H) Hosts
