= 2009 Rugby World Cup Sevens =

Rugby tournament in 2009

كأس العالم للرجبي 2009 السبعات

Tournament details
- Host nation: United Arab Emirates
- Dates: March 5 – March 7
- No. of nations: 24 (men); 16 (women)

Final positions
- Champions: Wales (men); Australia (women)
- Runner-up: Argentina (men); New Zealand (women)

Tournament statistics
- Attendance: 78,000

The 2009 Rugby sevens World Cup was the fifth edition of the Rugby World Cup Sevens. The International Rugby Board (IRB) selected Dubai in the United Arab Emirates as the host venue for the tournament ahead of bids from four other countries. The format included nine direct qualifiers and a further fifteen qualifiers from all six regions defined by the IRB. A women's version of the world cup was also held alongside the men's tournament for the first time and featured sixteen teams. The men's cup was won by Wales, with the women's cup going to Australia.

The men's teams of Fiji, New Zealand and Australia, who entered the semi-finals in the two previous editions, failed to do so in 2009: the former were defeated by quarter-finals Kenya and Wales respectively, whereas Australia lost two of the three matches in the pool stage and did not advance to quarter-finals.

Wales, which had never reached quarter-finals in the previous editions of the World Cup, beat Samoa in semi-finals and Argentina in the final to win the tournament. Kenya had never reached the Cup or Plate stages before, but shared 3rd place in 2009.

== Bids ==
A record seven countries originally expressed interest in hosting the tournament however, only five officially submitted bids for hosting rights after Kenya and South Africa withdrew from the bidding process. The United Arab Emirates, Australia, the Netherlands, Russia and the United States were the five candidates. The voting process consisted of two rounds. No clear majority was reached in the first round and therefore the top two, the United Arab Emirates (UAE) and Australia, progressed to a second round, with the IRB subsequently selecting the UAE as the host union. The IRB cited the provision of a new purpose built stadium, the recent success of the Dubai Sevens tournament and the Under 19 Rugby World Championship as strong factors in their decision to select the Arabian Gulf RFU as the host union. The event was the first major rugby tournament to be held in the Middle East.

== Qualification ==
=== Men ===
24 Teams took part in this tournament

Africa	North America/ Caribbean	South America	Asia	Europe	Oceania
Automatic qualification
South Africa		Argentina	(Cooperation Council for the Arab States of the Gulf) Arabian Gulf (host)	England; France; Scotland	Australia; Fiji (holders); New Zealand
Regional qualifiers
Kenya; Tunisia; Zimbabwe	Canada; United States	Uruguay	Hong Kong; Japan	Georgia; Ireland; Italy; Portugal; Wales	Samoa; Tonga

=== Women ===
16 Teams took part in this tournament

Africa	North America/ Caribbean	South America	Asia	Europe	Oceania
South Africa; Uganda	Canada; United States	Brazil	China; Japan; Thailand	England; France; Italy; Netherlands; Russia; Spain	Australia; New Zealand

== Trophy Overview ==
	Men's		Women's	
	Champions	Runner-up	Champions	Runner-up
Cup	Wales	Argentina	Australia	New Zealand
Plate	Scotland	Australia	England	Canada
Bowl	Zimbabwe	Ireland	China	Brazil

== See also ==
- Women's Rugby World Cup
- IRB Sevens World Series
- Rugby World Cup Sevens
- Rugby World Cup
