= 2019 Africa Women's Sevens =

Rugby Tournament

- Hosts: Tunisia
- Date: 12–13 October
- Nations: 10

Final positions
- Champions: South Africa
- Runners-up: Kenya
- Third: Madagascar

The 2019 Africa Women's Sevens was a women's rugby sevens tournament held in Monastir, Tunisia on 12–13 October 2019.

The tournament acted as qualification for the 2020 Hong Kong Women's Sevens, which in turns serves as a qualification tournament for the World Rugby Women's Sevens Series.

The tournament also acted as qualification for the 2020 Summer Olympics.

South Africa won the tournament and qualified for the Hong Kong Sevens along with Kenya. South Africa declined Olympics qualification so Kenya earned the automatic qualifying spot.

== Teams ==
- Botswana
- Ghana
- Kenya
- Madagascar
- Mauritius
- Morocco
- Senegal
- South Africa
- Tunisia
- Uganda
- Zambia
- Zimbabwe

== Pool stage ==
The top two teams in each pool as well as the two best 3rd ranked teams qualify for the cup quarterfinals.

Legend
Advance to Cup quarterfinals
Advance to Challenge Trophy semifinals

=== Pool A ===
Team	Pld	W	D	L	PF	PA	PD	Pts
Kenya	3	3	0	0	123	0	+123	9
Senegal	3	2	0	1	36	56	−20	7
Ghana	3	1	0	2	22	63	−41	5
Botswana	3	0	0	3	20	82	−62	3

12 Oct 2019	Senegal	19–10	Botswana	Jemmal, Tunisia
10:28

12 Oct 2019	Kenya	36–0	Ghana	Jemmal, Tunisia
10:50

12 Oct 2019	Senegal	17–10	Ghana	Jemmal, Tunisia
13:04

12 Oct 2019	Kenya	51–0	Botswana	Jemmal, Tunisia
13:26

12 Oct 2019	Botswana	10–12	Ghana	Jemmal, Tunisia
15:38

12 Oct 2019	Kenya	36–0	Senegal	Jemmal, Tunisia
16:00

=== Pool B ===
Team	Pld	W	D	L	PF	PA	PD	Pts
South Africa	3	3	0	0	99	0	+99	9
Uganda	3	2	0	1	25	47	−22	7
Zimbabwe	3	1	0	2	17	48	−31	5
Zambia	3	0	0	3	17	63	−46	3

12 Oct 2019	Zimbabwe	12–7	Zambia	Jemmal, Tunisia
9:44

12 Oct 2019	Uganda	0–32	South Africa	Jemmal, Tunisia
10:06

12 Oct 2019	Zimbabwe	0–31	South Africa	Jemmal, Tunisia
12:20

12 Oct 2019	Uganda	15–10	Zambia	Jemmal, Tunisia
12:42

12 Oct 2019	Zambia	0–36	South Africa	Jemmal, Tunisia
14:54

12 Oct 2019	Uganda	10–5	Zimbabwe	Jemmal, Tunisia
15:16

=== Pool C ===
Team	Pld	W	D	L	PF	PA	PD	Pts
Madagascar	3	3	0	0	89	7	+82	9
Tunisia	3	2	0	1	76	14	+62	7
Morocco	3	1	0	2	41	65	−24	5
Mauritius	3	0	0	3	0	120	−120	3

12 Oct 2019	Madagascar	34–0	Morocco	Jemmal, Tunisia
9:00

12 Oct 2019	Tunisia	38–0	Mauritius	Jemmal, Tunisia
9:22

12 Oct 2019	Madagascar	41–0	Mauritius	Jemmal, Tunisia
11:36

12 Oct 2019	Tunisia	31–0	Morocco	Jemmal, Tunisia
11:58

12 Oct 2019	Morocco	41–0	Mauritius	Jemmal, Tunisia
14:10

12 Oct 2019	Tunisia	7–14	Madagascar	Jemmal, Tunisia
14:32

== Knockout stage ==
=== Challenge Trophy ===
Semi-finals
13 Oct 2019 – 10:58 – Jemmal, Tunisia
Ghana	29
Mauritius	10
13 Oct 2019 – 11:20 – Jemmal, Tunisia
Zambia	24
Botswana	5

Final
13 Oct 2019 – 14:26 – Jemmal, Tunisia
Ghana	21
Zambia	14
Eleventh Place
13 Oct 2019 – 14:04 – Jemmal, Tunisia
Mauritius	17
Botswana	22

=== 5th place ===
Semi-finals
13 Oct 2019 – 12:36 – Jemmal, Tunisia
Morocco	12
Senegal	17
13 Oct 2019 – 12:58 – Jemmal, Tunisia
Uganda	7
Zimbabwe	0

Final
13 Oct 2019 – 15:42 – Jemmal, Tunisia
Senegal	5
Uganda	12
Seventh Place
13 Oct 2019 – 15:20 – Jemmal, Tunisia
Morocco	22
Zimbabwe	12

=== Cup ===
Quarter-finals
13 Oct 2019 – 9:30 – Jemmal, Tunisia
South Africa	42
Morocco	0
13 Oct 2019 – 9:52 – Jemmal, Tunisia
Madagascar	24
Senegal	5
13 Oct 2019 – 10:14 – Jemmal, Tunisia
Uganda	0
Tunisia	33
13 Oct 2019 – 10:36 – Jemmal, Tunisia
Kenya	36
Zimbabwe	5

Semi-finals
13 Oct 2019 – 13:20 – Jemmal, Tunisia
South Africa	29
Madagascar	0
13 Oct 2019 – 13:42 – Jemmal, Tunisia
Tunisia	0
Kenya	19

Final
13 Oct 2019 – 16:30 – Jemmal, Tunisia
South Africa	15
Kenya	14
Third place
13 Oct 2019 – 16:04 – Jemmal, Tunisia
Madagascar	5
Tunisia	0

== Final standings ==
Legend
Qualified for the 2020 Summer Olympics.
Qualified for the Final Qualification Tournament.

Rank	Team
1st place, gold medalist(s)	South Africa
2nd place, silver medalist(s)	Kenya
3rd place, bronze medalist(s)	Madagascar
4	Tunisia
5	Uganda
6	Senegal
7	Morocco
8	Zimbabwe
9	Ghana
10	Zambia
11	Botswana
12	Mauritius
