= 2009 Rugby World Cup Sevens – Women's tournament =

Rugby tournament in 2009

Tournament details
- Venue: The Sevens
- Dates: 6 – 7 March
- No. of nations: 16

Final positions
- Champions: Australia
- Runner-up: New Zealand

Tournament statistics
- Matches played: 41
- Tries scored: 193 (average 4.71 per match)
- Top scorer(s): (New Zealand) Selica Winiata (52 points)

The inaugural women's tournament in the 2009 Rugby World Cup Sevens was held at The Sevens in Dubai alongside the men's tournament. The tournament was held from 6 March to 7 March, with Australia beating New Zealand 15−10 at the final.

== Teams ==
16 teams took part in this tournament

- Australia
- Brazil
- Canada
- China
- England
- France
- Italy
- Japan
- Netherlands
- New Zealand
- Russia
- South Africa
- Spain
- Thailand
- Uganda
- United States

== Pool Stages ==
Legend
Teams advanced to the Cup quarter-final
Teams advanced to the Bowl quarter-final

=== Pool A ===
Team	Pld	W	D	L	PF	PA	+/–	Pts
France	3	2	0	1	47	32	+15	7
Australia	3	2	0	1	96	26	+70	7
China	3	1	0	2	48	81	–33	5
Netherlands	3	1	0	2	29	81	–52	5

6 March 2009
11:00

Australia	50–12	China

6 March 2009
11:22

France	14–17	Netherlands

6 March 2009
13:56

Australia	10–14	France

6 March 2009
14:18

China	31–12	Netherlands

6 March 2009
16:52

Australia	36–0	Netherlands

6 March 2009
17:14

China	5–19	France

=== Pool B ===
Team	Pld	W	D	L	PF	PA	+/-	Pts
England	3	3	0	0	93	0	+93	9
United States	3	2	0	1	50	17	+33	7
Russia	3	1	0	2	31	51	–20	5
Japan	3	0	0	3	10	116	–106	3

6 March 2009
13:12

England	17–0	United States

6 March 2009
13:34

Japan	10–31	Russia

6 March 2009
15:24

England	29–0	Russia

6 March 2009
15:46

Japan	0–38	United States

6 March 2009
19:04

Russia	0–12	United States

6 March 2009
19:26

England	47–0	Japan

=== Pool C ===
Team	Pld	W	D	L	PF	PA	+/-	Pts
Spain	3	3	0	0	50	12	+38	9
Canada	3	2	0	1	90	19	+71	7
Brazil	3	1	0	2	12	67	–55	5
Thailand	3	0	0	3	29	83	–54	3

6 March 2009
11:44

Canada	52–7	Thailand

6 March 2009
12:06

Brazil	0–19	Spain

6 March 2009
14:40

Brazil	12–10	Thailand

6 March 2009
15:02

Canada	0–12	Spain

6 March 2009
17:36

Spain	19–12	Thailand

6 March 2009
17:58

Brazil	0–38	Canada

=== Pool D ===
Team	Pld	W	D	L	PF	PA	+/-	Pts
New Zealand	3	3	0	0	120	0	+120	9
South Africa	3	2	0	1	43	30	+13	7
Italy	3	1	0	2	17	69	–52	5
Uganda	3	0	0	3	7	88	–81	3

6 March 2009
12:28

New Zealand	50–0	Uganda

6 March 2009
12:50

South Africa	17–5	Italy

6 March 2009
15:24

New Zealand	45–0	Italy

6 March 2009
15:46

South Africa	26–0	Uganda

6 March 2009
18:20

Italy	12–7	Uganda

6 March 2009
18:42

New Zealand	25–0	South Africa

== Knockout ==
=== Bowl ===
Quarter-finals
7 March 2009 – 11:00
China	21
Japan	5
7 March 2009 – 11:22
Italy	17
Thailand	0
7 March 2009 – 11:44
Brazil	12
Uganda	7
7 March 2009 – 12:06
Russia	12
Netherlands	5

Semi-finals
7 March 2009 – 14:30
China	28
Italy	0
7 March 2009 – 14:52
Brazil	17
Russia	12

Final
7 March 2009 – 17:52
China	10
Brazil	7

=== Plate ===
Semi-finals
7 March 2009 – 15:14
France	12
Canada	19
7 March 2009 – 15:36
Spain	7
England	12

Final
7 March 2009 – 19:00
Canada	0
England	12

=== Cup ===
Quarter-finals
7 March 2009 – 12:28
France	0
United States	19
7 March 2009 – 12:50
New Zealand	33
Canada	12
7 March 2009 – 13:12
Spain	7
South Africa	15
7 March 2009 – 13:34
England	10
Australia	17

Semi-finals
7 March 2009 – 16:24
United States	12
New Zealand	14
7 March 2009 – 16:46
South Africa	10
Australia	17

Final
7 March 2009 – 20:00
New Zealand	10
Australia	15

2009 Rugby World Cup Sevens Women's winners

Australia
1st title
