= 2013 Rugby World Cup Sevens – Women's tournament =

Tournament details
- Venue: Luzhniki Stadium; Gorodok Stadium
- Dates: 29 – 30 June
- No. of nations: 16

Final positions
- Champions: New Zealand
- Runner-up: Canada

Tournament statistics
- Matches played: 42
- Tries scored: 201 (average 4.79 per match)
- Top scorer(s): (New Zealand) Portia Woodman (60 points)

The women's 2013 Rugby World Cup Sevens tournament was held at Luzhniki stadium and nearby Gorodok Stadium, both in Moscow. The tournament was held on 29 and 30 June, with New Zealand beating Canada 29−12 in the final. The eight quarter-finalists qualified as core teams for the 2013–14 IRB Women's Sevens World Series.

== Teams ==
- Australia (Holders)
- Brazil
- Canada
- China
- England
- Fiji
- France
- Ireland
- Japan
- Netherlands
- New Zealand
- Russia (Hosts)
- South Africa
- Spain
- Tunisia
- United States

Notes:
Canada qualified for the tournament through NACRA's regional qualifying tournament taking the 1 and only place available in the North America/Caribbean category.
Tunisia qualified for the tournament taking the 1 available place in the Africa category.
England, Ireland, Spain, France and Netherlands qualified for the tournament taking the 5 available places in the European category.
Fiji, Japan, and China qualified for the tournament through AFRU's regional qualifying tournament taking the 3 available places in the Asian and Oceania category.
Brazil qualified through CONSUR's regional qualifying tournament taking the 1 and only place in the South America category.

== Draw ==
The band allocation was completed on February 25 in advance of the pool draw on February 28.

The 16 teams were ranked in four bands of four, determined by series points accumulated over the three IRB Women's Sevens Challenge Cups, and the first two rounds of the 2012–13 IRB Women's Sevens World Series.

Band 1	England, Australia, Canada, United States
Band 2	New Zealand, South Africa, Spain, Russia
Band 3	Netherlands, China, France, Brazil
Band 4	Japan, Tunisia, Ireland, Fiji

== Pool Stage ==
Key to colours in group tables
Teams advanced to the Cup quarter-final
Teams advanced to the Bowl quarter-final

All times are local (UTC+4).

=== Pool A ===
Teams	Pld	W	D	L	PF	PA	+/−	Pts
New Zealand	3	3	0	0	97	5	+92	9
Canada	3	2	0	1	65	27	+38	7
Netherlands	3	1	0	2	33	61	−28	5
Tunisia	3	0	0	3	3	105	−102	3

29 June 2013
09:00

New Zealand	36 – 0	Tunisia
	Report

Gorodok Stadium

29 June 2013
09:22

Canada	17 – 7	Netherlands
	Report

Gorodok Stadium

29 June 2013
11:56

Canada	43 – 0	Tunisia
	Report

Gorodok Stadium

29 June 2013
12:18

New Zealand	41 – 0	Netherlands
	Report

Gorodok Stadium

29 June 2013
15:36

Netherlands	26 – 3	Tunisia
	Report

Luzhniki Stadium

29 June 2013
18:32

Canada	5 – 20	New Zealand
	Report

Luzhniki Stadium

=== Pool B ===
Teams	Pld	W	D	L	PF	PA	+/−	Pts
Australia	3	3	0	0	87	5	+82	9
Ireland	3	2	0	1	45	37	+8	7
South Africa	3	1	0	2	24	48	−24	5
China	3	0	0	3	17	83	−66	3

29 June 2013
09:44

Australia	36 – 0	China
	Report

Gorodok Stadium

29 June 2013
10:06

South Africa	5 – 12	Ireland
	Report

Gorodok Stadium

29 June 2013
12:40

Australia	22 – 5	Ireland
	Report

Gorodok Stadium

29 June 2013
13:02

South Africa	19 – 7	China
	Report

Gorodok Stadium

29 June 2013
15:58

China	10 – 28	Ireland
	Report

Luzhniki Stadium

29 June 2013
18:54

Australia	29 – 0	South Africa
	Report

Luzhniki Stadium

=== Pool C ===
Teams	Pld	W	D	L	PF	PA	+/−	Pts
United States	3	3	0	0	62	19	+43	9
Spain	3	1	1	1	47	43	+4	6
Brazil	3	1	0	2	34	52	−18	5
Fiji	3	0	1	2	33	62	−29	4

29 June 2013
10:28

United States	12 – 7	Brazil
	Report

Gorodok Stadium

29 June 2013
10:50

Spain	14 – 14	Fiji
	Report

Gorodok Stadium

29 June 2013
13:24

United States	31 – 5	Fiji
	Report

Gorodok Stadium

29 June 2013
13:46

Spain	26 – 10	Brazil
	Report

Gorodok Stadium

29 June 2013
17:04

Brazil	17 – 14	Fiji
	Report

Luzhniki Stadium

29 June 2013
20:00

United States	19 – 7	Spain
	Report

Luzhniki Stadium

=== Pool D ===
Teams	Pld	W	D	L	PF	PA	+/−	Pts
Russia	3	2	1	0	57	51	+6	8
England	3	2	0	1	69	17	+52	7
France	3	1	1	1	69	41	+28	6
Japan	3	0	0	3	10	96	−86	3

29 June 2013
11:12

England	15 – 0	France
	Report

Gorodok Stadium

29 June 2013
11:34

Russia	14 – 10	Japan
	Report

Gorodok Stadium

29 June 2013
14:08

Russia	26 – 26	France
	Report

Gorodok Stadium

29 June 2013
14:30

England	39 – 0	Japan
	Report

Gorodok Stadium

29 June 2013
17:26

France	43 – 0	Japan
	Report

Luzhniki Stadium

29 June 2013
20:22

England	15 – 17	Russia
	Report

Luzhniki Stadium

== Knockout stage ==
=== Bowl ===
Quarter-finals
30 June 2013 – 11:00 – Gorodok Stadium
Netherlands	19
Japan	14
30 June 2013 – 11:22 – Gorodok Stadium
Brazil	5
China	10
30 June 2013 – 11:44 – Gorodok Stadium
France	40
Tunisia	7
30 June 2013 – 12:06 – Gorodok Stadium
South Africa	5
Fiji	22

Semi-finals
30 June 2013 – 14:30 – Gorodok Stadium
Netherlands	17
China	12
30 June 2013 – 14:52 – Gorodok Stadium
France	10
Fiji	12

Final
30 June 2013 – 17:50 – Luzhniki Stadium
Netherlands	10
Fiji	12

=== Plate ===
Semi-finals
30 June 2013 – 15:14 – Gorodok Stadium
England	22
Ireland	0
30 June 2013 – 15:36 – Gorodok Stadium
Russia	5
Australia	7

Final
30 June 2013 – 18:40 – Luzhniki Stadium
England	5
Australia	14

=== Cup ===
Quarter-finals
30 June 2013 – 12:28 – Gorodok Stadium
New Zealand	24
England	7
30 June 2013 – 12:50 – Gorodok Stadium
United States	14
Ireland	5
30 June 2013 – 13:12 – Gorodok Stadium
Russia	12
Canada	15
30 June 2013 – 13:34 – Gorodok Stadium
Australia	10
Spain	14

Semi-finals
30 June 2013 – 15:56 – Luzhniki Stadium
New Zealand	19
United States	10
30 June 2013 – 16:18 – Luzhniki Stadium
Canada	10
Spain	0

Final
30 June 2013 – 20:25 – Luzhniki Stadium
New Zealand	29
Canada	12
Third place
30 June 2013 – 19:30 – Luzhniki Stadium
United States (aet)	10
Spain	5

2013 Rugby World Cup Sevens Women's winners

New Zealand
1st title
