= Jemmal =

Jemmel
- Commune and town
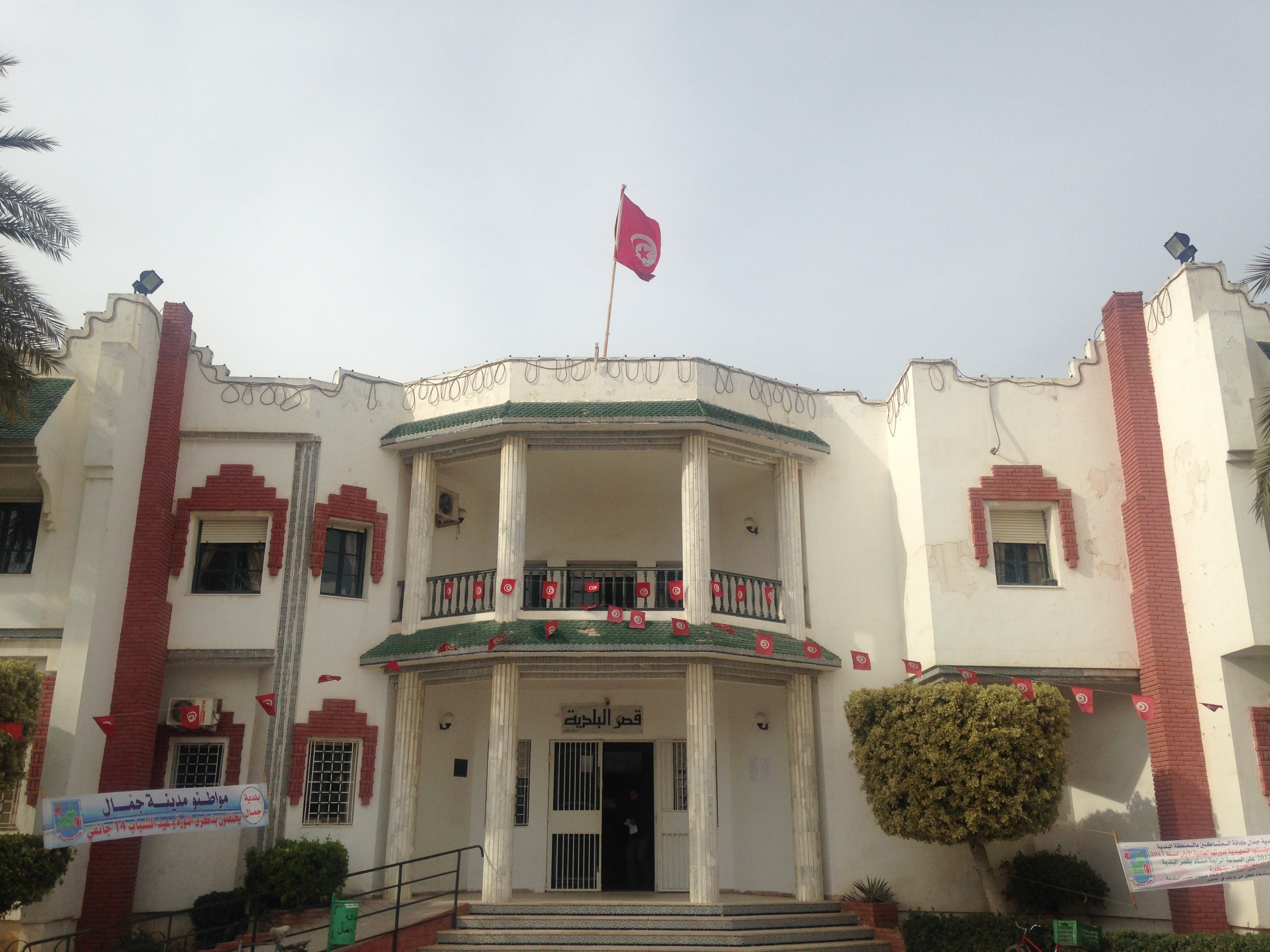
- Jemmal's City Hall

- Location within Tunisia
- Coordinates: 35°38′24″N 10°45′36″E
- Country: Tunisia
- Governorate: Monastir Governorate

Population (2014)
  - Total: 55,285
- Time zone: UTC+1 (CET)

Jemmal (Arabic: جمال) is a city in the Monastir Governorate of Tunisia, located about 20 kilometres (12 mi) south of Monastir. As of 2014 it had a population of 55,285. The city is well known for its historic Grand Mosque and is at the centre of a region of olive groves. A festival takes place each year during the olive harvest season in November or December. It is also an important industrial center for textiles and manufacturing; the manufacturing industry employs about half of Jemmal's active population. An industrial zone was established in 2005 on 7.5 hectares (.03 sq. miles), along the road that connects Jemmal to the town of Moknine.

== Notable people ==
- Taïeb Baccouche: Minister of Education in 2011, Minister of Foreign Affairs in 2015–2016

== Population ==
2014 Census (Municipal)
Homes	Families	Males	Females	Total
19108	14975	32670	32750	65420
