= Madagascar women's national rugby sevens team =

Madagascar
- Union: Madagascan Rugby Federation
- Nickname: Les Makis dames Ladies Makis
- Coach: (Madagascar) Zaka Ravelonanosy

World Cup Sevens
- Appearances: 1 (First in 2022)
- Best result: 15th place (2022)

The Madagascar women's national rugby union sevens team is Madagascar's representative in women's rugby sevens.

Madagascar competed at the 2020 Women's Rugby Sevens Final Olympic Qualification Tournament. They had placed third at the 2019 Africa Women's Sevens allowing them to compete at the final Olympic Qualification Tournament.

Madagascar made their first World Cup appearance in 2022, as they had reached the final of the 2022 Africa Women's Sevens held in Tunisia, only being narrowly defeated 14–15 by South Africa.

== Tournament History ==
=== Rugby World Cup Sevens ===
Rugby World Cup Sevens
Year	Round	Position	Pld	W	L	D
(United Arab Emirates) 2009	Did not qualify					
(Russia) 2013	Did not qualify					
(United States) 2018	Did not qualify					
(South Africa) 2022	15th-place Final	15th	4	1	3	0
Total	0 Titles	1/4	4	1	3	0

=== Summer Olympics ===
Olympic Games record
Year	Round	Position	Pld	W	L	D
(Brazil) 2016	Did not qualify					
(Japan) 2020	Did not qualify					
(France) 2024	Did not qualify					
Total	0 Titles	0/3	0	0	0	0

=== Women's Africa Cup Sevens ===
Women's Africa Cup Sevens
Year	Round	Position	Pld	W	L	D
2013	Did Not Participate					
2014	5th Place Finalists	6th	5	2	3	0
2015	5th Place	5th	6	4	2	0
2016	7th Place	7th	4	1	3	0
2017	5th Place	5th	6	4	2	0
2018	Semifinalists	4th	5	2	3	0
2019	Semifinalists	3rd	6	5	1	0
2022	Finalists	2nd	5	4	1	0
2023	5th Place	5th	5	3	2	0
Total	0 Titles	8/9	42	25	17	0

== See also ==
- Rugby union in Madagascar
