= Kenya women's national rugby sevens team =

Kenya
- Union: Kenya Rugby Union
- Nickname: Lionesses
- Ground: RFUEA Ground
- Coach: Dennis Mwanja
- Captain: Grace Okulu
Team kit

Kenya women's national rugby sevens team plays in several tournaments including the African Women's Sevens Championship, Dubai Invitational Sevens and the Hong Kong Women's Sevens.

== History ==
In 2012, Kenya's captain Aberdeen Shikoyi died on 29 May after an injury she sustained in a match against Uganda.

Kenya qualified for the 2016 Summer Olympics by winning the 2015 Women's Africa Cup Sevens. In 2019, despite coming second at the Africa Women's Sevens, they qualified for the Tokyo Olympics because South Africa declined their regional spot.

In 2024, they competed in the World Rugby Sevens Challenger Series; they were runners-up in the first round of the series which took place in Dubai. They finished fifth overall at the 2024 Sevens Challenger Series and missed out on qualifying for the new SVNS Play-off promotion and relegation competition in Madrid.

== Tournament history ==
=== Summer Olympics ===
Olympic Games record
| Year | Round | Position | Pld | W | L | D |
|---|---|---|---|---|---|---|
| (Brazil) 2016 | Placement round | 11th | 5 | 1 | 4 | 0 |
| (Japan) 2020 | 9th Place Match | 10th | 5 | 1 | 4 | 0 |
| Total | 0 Titles | 2/2 | 10 | 2 | 8 | 0 |

=== Commonwealth Games ===
Commonwealth Games record
| Year | Round | Position | Pld | W | L | D |
|---|---|---|---|---|---|---|
| (Australia) 2018 | Placement round | 6th | 5 | 3 | 2 | 0 |
| (England) 2022 | Did not qualify | | | | | |
| Total | 0 Titles | 1/2 | 5 | 3 | 2 | 0 |

=== Rugby Africa Women's Sevens ===
Rugby Africa Women's Sevens record
| Year | Round | Position | Pld | W | L | D |
|---|---|---|---|---|---|---|
| (Uganda) 2008 | Semi Final | 3rd place, bronze medalist(s) | 5 | 3 | 2 | 0 |
| (Morocco) 2012 | Final | 2nd place, silver medalist(s) | 5 | 4 | 1 | 0 |
| (Tunisia) 2013 | Semi Final | 4 | 4 | 1 | 3 | 0 |
| (Kenya) 2014 | Final | 2nd place, silver medalist(s) | 5 | 3 | 2 | 0 |
| (South Africa) 2015 | Final | 2nd place, silver medalist(s) | 6 | 5 | 1 | 0 |
| (Zimbabwe) 2016 | Final | 2nd place, silver medalist(s) | 5 | 4 | 1 | 0 |
| (Tunisia) 2017 | Final | 2nd place, silver medalist(s) | 6 | 5 | 1 | 0 |
| (Botswana) 2018 | Final | 1st place, gold medalist(s) | 5 | 5 | 0 | 0 |
| (Tunisia) 2019 | Final | 2nd place, silver medalist(s) | 6 | 5 | 1 | 0 |
| (Tunisia) 2022 | Plate Final | 5 | 5 | 3 | 2 | 0 |
| (Tunisia) 2023 | Final | 2nd place, silver medalist(s) | 5 | 4 | 1 | 0 |
| (Ghana) 2024 | Final | 2nd place, silver medalist(s) | 6 | 5 | 1 | 0 |
| (Kenya) 2025 | Final | 2nd place, silver medalist(s) | 6 | 5 | 1 | 0 |
| Total | 1 Titles | 13/13 | 69 | 52 | 17 | 0 |

== Team ==
=== Current squad ===
Kenya's squad to the 2024 World Rugby Sevens Challenger Series:

| No. | Players |
|---|---|
| 1 | Naomi Amuguni |
| 2 | Christabel Lindo |
| 3 | Sheila Chajira |
| 4 | Stella Wafula |
| 5 | Phoebe Otieno |
| 6 | Moreen Muritu |
| 7 | Sinaida Nyachio |
| 8 | Diana Nyairo |
| 9 | Judith Okumu |
| 10 | Grace Okulu |
| 11 | Sharon Auma |
| 12 | Diana Ochieng |
