= Tunisia women's national rugby sevens team =

Tunisia
- Union: Tunisian Rugby Federation
- Nickname(s): نسور قرطاج (Eagles of Carthage)
- Coach: Malick Tcha-tchibara
Team kit	Change kit

World Cup Sevens
- Appearances: 1 (First in 2013)
- Best result: 13th

The Tunisian women's national rugby union sevens team is Tunisia's representative in women's rugby sevens. Tunisia competed at the 2020 Women's Rugby Sevens Final Olympic Qualification Tournament. They placed fourth at the 2019 Africa Women's Sevens but because South Africa declined an Olympics qualification, Kenya earned the automatic qualifying spot which allowed Madagascar and Tunisia to compete at the final Olympic Qualification Tournament.

== Tournament History ==
=== Rugby World Cup Sevens ===
Rugby World Cup Sevens
Year	Round	Position	Pld	W	L	D
(United Arab Emirates) 2009	Did not qualify					
(Russia) 2013	Bowl Quarterfinalists	13th	4	0	4	0
(United States) 2018	Did not qualify					
(South Africa) 2022	TBD					
Total	0 Titles	1/3	4	0	4	0

=== Summer Olympics ===
Olympic Games record
Year	Round	Position	Pld	W	L	D
(Brazil) 2016	Did not qualify					
(Japan) 2020	Did not qualify					
Total	0 Titles	0/2	0	0	0	0

=== Women's Africa Cup Sevens ===
Women's Africa Cup Sevens
Year	Round	Position	Pld	W	L	D
2013	Finalists	3rd	4	3	1	0
2014	Semifinalists	3rd	5	4	1	0
2015	Semifinalists	3rd	6	4	2	0
2016	5th Place Finalists	5th	4	2	2	0
2017	Semifinalists	3rd	6	4	2	0
2018	Semifinalists	3rd	5	3	1	1
2019	Semifinalists	4th	6	4	2	0
Total	0 Titles	5/5	25	17	8	0

== Current squad ==
Tunisian national team's list in the first matches of the African Cup of Nations preliminary matches.

- Amal Dardouri
- Halima Charrada
- Falfoul Sandaise
- Hajer Saoudi
- Baya Ajroud
- Yasmine Korbi
- Nour Jalali
- Emna Zarai

== See also ==
- Rugby union in Tunisia
