= South Africa women's national rugby sevens team =

South Africa
- Union: South African Rugby Union
- Nickname(s): Springbok Women's Sevens; Blazeboks; Imbokodo
- Coach: Cecil Afrika
- Captain: Nadine Roos
- Most caps: Mathrin Simmers
- Top scorer: Nadine Roos
Team kit	Change kit

World Cup Sevens
- Appearances: 4 (First in 2009)
- Best result: Semi-finals (2009)

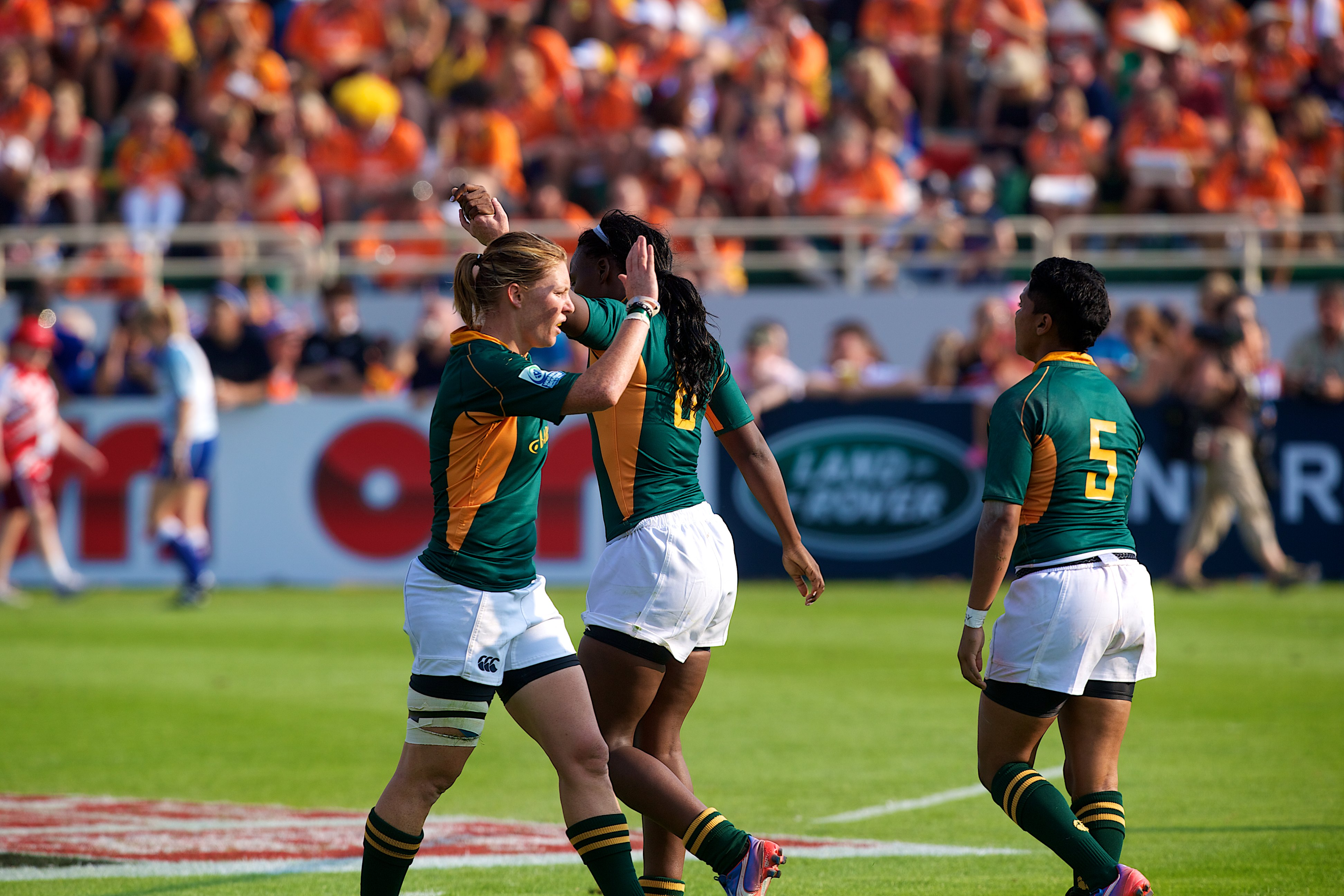
South Africa at the 2012 Dubai Women's 7s

The South Africa women's national rugby sevens team competes at events within the World Rugby Women's Sevens Series and are a core team for the 2023–24 season. They first played in the 2009 Rugby World Cup Sevens, and also competed in the IRB Women's Sevens Challenge Cup in the 2011–12 season.

South Africa qualified for the 2016 Rio Olympics after winning the 2015 Women's Africa Cup Sevens, but did not enter the tournament because the South African Olympic Committee (SASCOC) rules states that teams cannot qualify by winning continental titles. As in 2016, South Africa missed Tokyo 2020 for the same reason. South Africa will finally make their Olympic debut in Paris 2024.

== Tournament History ==
=== Olympics ===
Olympics
Year	Round	Position	Pld	W	D	L
(Brazil) 2016	Qualified but withdrew					
(Japan) 2020	Qualified but withdrew					
(France) 2024	11th Place Playoff	11th	5	1	0	4
Total	0 Titles	1/3	5	1	0	4

=== Rugby World Cup Sevens ===
Rugby World Cup Sevens
Year	Round	Position	Pld	W	L	D
(United Arab Emirates) 2009	Semifinalists	3rd place, bronze medalist(s)	5	3	2	0
(Russia) 2013	Bowl Quarterfinalists	13th	4	1	3	0
(United States) 2018	13th Place Final	14th	4	1	3	0
(South Africa) 2022	13th Place Final	14th	4	1	3	0
Total	0 Titles	4/4	17	6	11	0

=== Commonwealth Games ===
Commonwealth Games
Year	Round	Position	Pld	W	D	L
(Australia) 2018	Classification Semi Finals	8th	5	0	0	5
(England) 2022	Seventh Place Match	7th	5	1	0	4
Total	0 Titles	2/2	10	1	0	9

=== Women's Africa Cup Sevens ===
Women's Africa Cup Sevens
Year	Round	Position	Pld	W	L	D
2013	Champions	1st	4	4	0	0
2014	Champions	1st	5	5	0	0
2015	Champions	1st	6	6	0	0
2016	Champions	1st	5	5	0	0
2017	Champions	1st	6	6	0	0
2019	Champions	1st	6	6	0	0
2022	Champions	1st	5	5	0	0
2023	Champions	1st	5	5	0	0
2024	Champions	1st	6	6	0	0
2025	Champions	1st	6	6	0	0
Total	6 Titles	8/8	48	48	0	0

== Players ==
=== Current squad ===
2026 SVNS 3 in squad was announced on 12 January 2026.

Head coach: Cecil Afrika

Player	Position	Date of birth (age)	Caps	Club/province
Leigh Fortuin	Centre	23 September 2000 (aged 25)	3	
Asisipho Plaatjies	Prop	24 April 1996 (aged 29)	4	
Patience Mokone	Wing	17 April 2002 (aged 23)	2	
Zintle Mpupha	Forward	25 December 1993 (aged 32)	17	(South Africa) Bulls Daisies
Maria Tshiremba	Wing	29 December 1995 (aged 30)	11	
Nadine Roos (Captain)	Wing	9 May 1996 (aged 29)	18	Unattached (Captain)
Byrhandré Dolf	Back	4 July 2003 (aged 22)	4	(South Africa) Bulls Daisies
Liske Lategan	Prop	25 November 1998 (aged 27)	11	
Simamkele Namba	Wing	3 October 1998 (aged 27)	9	
Vianca Boer	Centre	10 December 2001 (aged 24)	1	
Shiniqwa Lamprecht	Centre	24 April 2003 (aged 22)	13	
Ayanda Malinga	Wing	23 June 1998 (aged 27)	13	(South Africa) Bulls Daisies
