= Uganda women's national rugby sevens team =

Uganda
- Union: Uganda Rugby Union
- Nickname: Lady Cranes
- Coach: (Uganda) Charles Onencan

World Cup Sevens
- Appearances: 1 (First in 2009)
- Best result: Bowl quarterfinals (2009)

The Uganda women's national rugby sevens team represents Uganda in international rugby sevens. They compete annually in the Africa Women's Sevens, and have made an appearance in the 2009 Rugby World Cup Sevens at the inaugural women's tournament.

== History ==
Uganda has previously participated in the 2009 Rugby World Cup Sevens for the inaugural women's tournament. Former coach, Helen Buteme, was one of the players in the 2009 squad.

Uganda competed at the 2019 Africa Women's Sevens which also served as an automatic Olympic qualification tournament for the winner. They finished in 5th place. The Lady Cranes attended the 2021 Safari Sevens. In 2024, they participated in the World Rugby Sevens Challenger Series; they placed fourth in the first round of the series which took place in Dubai. They finished sixth overall at the 2024 Sevens Challenger Series and missed out on qualifying for the new SVNS Play-off promotion and relegation tournament in Madrid.

== Tournament History ==
=== Rugby World Cup Sevens ===
Rugby World Cup Sevens
Year	Round	Position	Pld	W	L	D
(United Arab Emirates) 2009	Bowl Quarterfinalists	13th	4	0	4	0
(Russia) 2013	Did not qualify					
(United States) 2018	Did not qualify					
Total	0 Titles	1/3	4	0	4	0

=== Women's Africa Cup Sevens ===
Women's Africa Cup Sevens
Year	Round	Position	Pld	W	L	D
2013	Semifinalists	3rd	4	2	2	0
2014	Bowl Winners	5th	5	3	2	0
2015	Plate Semifinalists	7th	6	3	3	0
2016	Semifinalists	4th	5	2	3	0
2017	Bowl Winners	4th	6	2	4	0
Total	0 Titles	5/5	26	12	14	0

== Players ==
Uganda's squad to the 2024 World Rugby Sevens Challenger Series:

No.	Players
1	Lydia Namabiro
2	Yvonne Najjuma
3	Mary Ayot
4	Sarah Kirabo
5	Grace Nabaggala
6	Rachael Mufuwa
7	Agnes Nakuya
8	Ritta Nadunga
9	Lona Amoli
10	Mayimuna Nassozi
12	Peace Lekuru
18	Janati Nandudu
