= 2019–20 World Rugby Women's Sevens Series squads =

International rugby sevens

Sevens 2019–20 squads

This is a list of the complete squads for the 2019–20 World Rugby Women's Sevens Series.

Legend
Gold	Indicates the captains for a tournament
–	Indicates that a player did not play in the tournament

== New Zealand ==
Head Coach: (New Zealand) Cory Sweeney and (New Zealand) Allan Bunting

New Zealand team members 2019–20
Player	Jersey number by tournament				
Player	Glendale	Dubai	Cape Town	Hamilton	Sydney
Shakira Baker	2	2	–	–	–
Michaela Blyde	6	–	–	6	6
Kelly Brazier	8	8	8	8	8
Gayle Broughton	9	9	9	9	9
Theresa Fitzpatrick	10	10	10	10	10
Sarah Hirini	5	–	–	5	5
Risi Pouri-Lane	11	13	2	2	–
Montessa Tairakena	12	–	–	–	–
Terina Te Tamaki	3	–	–	–	–
Ruby Tui	1	1	1	1	1
Stacey Waaka	7	3	3	3	3
Niall Williams	4	4	4	4	4
Huia Harding	–	5	5	–	–
Shiray Kaka	–	11	11	–	11
Tyla Nathan-Wong	–	7	7	7	7
Alena Saili	–	12	11	12	12
Tenika Willison	–	6	13	13	2
Mahina Paul	–	–	6	11	–
Jazmin Hotham	–	–	–	–	13

== Russia ==
Head Coach: (Russia) Andrey Kuzin

Russia team members 2019–20
Player	Jersey number by tournament				
Player	Glendale	Dubai	Cape Town	Hamilton	Sydney
Anna Baranchuk	12	12	12	12	12
Iana Danilova	11	–	6	13	6
Anna Gavrilyuk	6	6	–	6	10
Diana Glushenko	9	–	–	3	3
Baizat Khamidova	5	5	5	5	5
Marina Kukina	8	13	–	8	8
Daria Lushina	2	2	–	2	2
Alena Mikhaltsova	4	4	4	–	–
Daria Noritsina	1	1	1	1	1
Kristina Seredina	7	7	7	4	4
Daria Shestakova	3	3	13	–	–
Elena Zdrokova	10	10	10	10	–
Arina Bystrova	–	11	11	–	–
Marina Myasnnikova	–	9	9	9	9
Nadezhda Sozonova	–	8	8	7	7
Alina Arterchuk	–	–	2	–	–
Snezhanna Kulkova	–	–	3	–	–
Anastasia Prokudina	–	–	–	11	11

== Spain ==
Head Coach: (Spain) Pedro de Matías

Spain team members 2019–20
Player	Jersey number by tournament				
Player	Glendale	Dubai	Cape Town	Hamilton	Sydney
Eva Aguirre	1	1	1	1	1
Marina Bravo	5	5	5	5	5
María Casado	9	–	–	9	9
Beatriz Dominguez Sanchez	2	2	–	2	2
Iera Echebarría	11	11	11	11	11
Amaia Erbina	3	3	3	3	3
Anne Fernández de Corres	10	10	10	–	–
Olivia Fresnada	8	8	8	8	8
María García	12	6	6	6	6
Patricia García	4	4	4	4	4
Barbara Pla	7	7	7	7	7
Iciar Pozo Eizaguirre	6	–	–	–	–
Uri Barrutieta	–	9	2	–	–
Lucia Diaz	–	13	9	–	–
Lide Erbina	–	9	12	12	12
Clara Piquero	–	–	–	10	13
Paula Requena	–	–	–	13	10

== United States ==
Head Coach: (New Zealand) Chris Brown

United States team members 2019–20
Player	Jersey number by tournament				
Player	Glendale	Dubai	Cape Town	Hamilton	Sydney
Lauren Doyle	6	6	6	6	6
Cheta Emba	1	1	1	13	8
Jordan Matyas	8	8	8	8	–
Abby Gustaitis	3	3	3	3	3
Eti Haungatau	10	9	9	9	9
Nicole Heavirland	4	4	4	4	4
Alev Kelter	5	5	5	5	5
Kristi Kirshe	12	12	12	12	12
Ilona Maher	2	2	2	2	2
Kasey McCravey	11	13	10	–	–
Stephanie Rovetti	9	–	–	1	1
Naya Tapper	7	7	7	7	13
Kayla Canett	–	10	13	10	10
Kristen Thomas	–	11	11	11	11
Joanne Fa'avesi	–	–	–	–	7

== Non-core teams ==
One place in each tournament of the series is allocated to a national team based on performance in the respective continental tournaments within Africa, Asia, Europe, Oceania, and the Americas. Dispite not being a core team, Japan got invited to 3 of the 5 tournaments as the wild card team in preparation to host the Olympic tournament.

== China ==
Head Coach: (New Zealand) Sean Horan

China team members 2019–20
Player	Jersey number by tournament
Player	Hamilton
Yang Feifei	9
Lyu Hewen	13
Chen Keyi	7
Yu Liping	3
Yang Min	2
Tang Minglin	1
Su Qi	4
Wang Wanyu	6
Zheng Wenyan	5
Yu Xiaoming	10
Liu Xiaoqian	8
Xu Xiaoyan	11
Gu Yaoyao	12

== Japan ==
Head Coach: (Japan) Hitoshi Inada

Japan team members 2019–20
Player	Jersey number by tournament		
Player	Glendale	Dubai	Sydney
Atecayumi Bativakalolo	6	–	–
Raichel Bativakalolo	3	3	3
Yume Hirano	7	7	–
Yuki Ito	12	–	12
Mele Yua Havili Kagawa	8	2	2
Tomomi Kozasa	10	10	–
Riho Kurogi	9	8	–
Hana Nagata	11	5	5
Chiharu Nakamura	1	1	1
Yume Okuroda	2	–	–
Fumiko Otake	4	4	4
Honoka Tsutsumi	5	11	7
Haruka Hirotsu	–	9	8
Iroha Nagata	–	6	–
Yoko Suzuki	–	12	–
Wakaba Hara	–	–	11
Sayaka Suzuki	–	–	6
Emii Tanaka	–	–	10
Ayumi Yabuuchi	–	–	9

== South Africa ==
Head Coach: (South Africa) Paul Delport

South Africa team members 2019–20
Player	Jersey number by tournament
Player	Cape Town
Lusanda Dumke	13
Catha Jacobs	11
Zenay Jordaan	5
Liske Lategan	12
Rights Mkhari	1
Zintle Mpupha	4
Megh Phillips	6
Nadine Roos	9
Mathrin Simmers	10
Sizophila Solontsi	8
Bhule Sonamzi	3
Christelene Steinhobel	2
Eloise Webb	7
