= 2019 in sports by month =

== Calendar by month ==
=== January ===
Date	Sport	Venue/Event	Staus	Winner/s
13 December 2018–1	Darts	(England) 2019 PDC World Darts Championship	International	(Netherlands) Michael van Gerwen
1	Ice hockey	(United States) 2019 NHL Winter Classic	Domestic	(Massachusetts) Boston Bruins
26 December 2018–5	Ice hockey	(Canada) 2019 World Junior Ice Hockey Championships	International	Finland
29 December 2018–5	Tennis	(Australia) 2019 Hopman Cup	International	Switzerland (Belinda Bencic & Roger Federer)
5–13	Darts	(England) 2019 BDO World Darts Championship	International	Men: (England) Glen Durrant; Women: (Japan) Mikuru Suzuki
5–13	Rugby sevens	(Uruguay) / (Chile) 2019 Sudamérica Rugby Sevens	Continental	Chile
5–1 February	Association football	(United Arab Emirates) 2019 AFC Asian Cup	Continental	Qatar
29 December 2018–6	Cross-country skiing	(Italy) / (Switzerland) / (Germany) 2018–19 Tour de Ski	International	Men: (Norway) Johannes Høsflot Klæbo; Women: (Norway) Ingvild Flugstad Østberg
29 December 2018–6	Ski jumping	(Germany) / (Austria) 2018–19 Four Hills Tournament	International	(Japan) Ryoyu Kobayashi
6–12	Ice hockey	(United Kingdom) 2019 IIHF World Women's U18 Championship Division I – Group B	International	France was promoted to Division I – Group A Netherlands was relegated to Division I – Group B Qualification
6–13	Ice hockey	(Japan) 2019 IIHF World Women's U18 Championship	International	Canada
6–17	Rally raid	(Peru) 2019 Dakar Rally	International	Cars: (Qatar) Nasser Al-Attiyah; Bikes: (Australia) Toby Price; Quads: (Argentina) Nicolás Cavigliasso; Trucks: (Russia) Eduard Nikolaev; UTV: (Chile) Francisco López Contardo
7	American football	(United States) 2019 College Football Playoff National Championship	Domestic	(South Carolina) Clemson Tigers
7–13	Ice hockey	(Austria) 2019 IIHF World Women's U18 Championship Division I – Group A	International	Slovakia was promoted to Top Division; Austria was relegated to Division I – Group B
8–13	Track cycling	(Indonesia) 2019 Asian Track Cycling Championships	Continental	South Korea
10–27	Bowls	(England) 2019 World Indoor Bowls Championship	International	Open: (Scotland) Stewart Anderson; Women: (Scotland) Julie Forrest
10–27	Handball	(Denmark) / (Germany) 2019 World Men's Handball Championship	International	Denmark
11–13	Speed skating	(Italy) 2019 European Speed Skating Championships	Continental	Netherlands
11–13	Speed skating	(Netherlands) 2019 European Short Track Speed Skating Championships	Continental	Hungary
12	Formula E	(Morocco) 2019 Marrakesh ePrix (FE #2)	International	(Belgium) Jérôme d'Ambrosio (Mahindra Racing)
12–18	Ice hockey	(Spain) 2019 IIHF World Women's U18 Championship Division I – Group B Qualification	International	South Korea was promoted to Division I – Group B
13–18	Ice hockey	(South Africa) 2019 IIHF Women's World Championship Division II – Group B Qualification	International	Ukraine was promoted to Division II – Group B
13–19	Ice hockey	(Estonia) 2019 World Junior Ice Hockey Championships Division II – Group A	International	Estonia was promoted to Division I – Group B South Korea was relegated to Division II – Group B
13–20	Netball	(England) 2019 Netball Quad Series (January)	International	Australia
13–20	Snooker	(England) 2019 Masters (Triple Crown #2)	International	(England) Judd Trump
14–20	Ice hockey	(Iceland) 2019 World Junior Ice Hockey Championships – Division III	International	China was promoted to Division II – Group B
14–27	Tennis	(Australia) 2019 Australian Open (Grand Slam #1)	International	Men: (Serbia) Novak Djokovic; Women: (Japan) Naomi Osaka
15–21	Ice hockey	(Croatia) 2019 World Junior Ice Hockey Championships Division II – Group B	International	Serbia was promoted to Division II – Group A Mexico was relegated to Division III
17–20	Curling	(United States) 2019 Continental Cup	International	(United Nations) Team World
17–10 February	Association football	(Chile) 2019 South American U-20 Championship	Continental	Ecuador
18–19	Luge	(Switzerland) 2019 FIL Junior European Luge Championships	Continental	Germany
19–20	Motorsport	(Mexico) 2019 Race of Champions	International	Race of Champions: (Mexico) Benito Guerra; Nations' Cup: Team Nordic ( (Denmark) Tom Kristensen & (Sweden) Johan Kristoffersson)
20–27	Nordic skiing	(Finland) 2019 Nordic Junior World Ski Championships	International	Russia
21–27	Figure skating	(Belarus) 2019 European Figure Skating Championships	Continental	Men: (Spain) Javier Fernández; Ladies: (Russia) Sofia Samodurova; Pairs: (France) (Vanessa James & Morgan Ciprès); Ice Dance: (France) (Gabriella Papadakis & Guillaume Cizeron)
24–27	Luge	(Germany) 2019 FIL World Luge Championships	International	Germany
24–27	Multi-sport	(United States) Winter X Games XXIII	International	United States
24–27	Rallying	(Monaco) 2019 Monte Carlo Rally (WRC #1)	International	(France) Sébastien Ogier & Julien Ingrassia (Citroën World Rally Team)
25–26	Ice hockey	(United States) 64th National Hockey League All-Star Game	Domestic	Metropolitan Division; MVP: (Nova Scotia) Sidney Crosby ( (Pennsylvania) Pittsburgh Penguins)
25–27	Speed skating	(Canada) 2019 World Junior Short Track Speed Skating Championships	International	South Korea
26	Formula E	(Chile) 2019 Santiago ePrix (FE #3)	International	(United Kingdom) Sam Bird (Envision Virgin Racing)
26	Horse racing	(United States) 2019 Pegasus World Cup	International	Horse: (United States) City Of Light; Jockey: (Venezuela) Javier Castellano; Trainer: (United States) Michael McCarthy
26–27	Rugby sevens	2019 New Zealand Sevens (WRSS #3)	International	Fiji
26–2 February	Bandy	(Sweden) 2019 Bandy World Championship	International	Russia
27	American football	(United States) 2019 Pro Bowl	Domestic	American Football Conference; Offensive MVP: (Texas) Patrick Mahomes ( (Missouri) Kansas City Chiefs); Defensive MVP: (Texas) Jamal Adams ( (New Jersey) New York Jets)
27–3 February	Biathlon	(Slovakia) Biathlon Junior World Championships 2019	International	Norway
30–3 February	Curling	(Sweden) 2018–19 Curling World Cup – Third Leg	International	Men: Canada (Skip: Matt Dunstone); Women: South Korea (Skip: Kim Min-ji); Mixed Doubles: Canada (Kadriana Sahaidak & Colton Lott)

=== February ===
Date	Sport	Venue/Event	Status	Winner/s
1–2	Luge	(Austria) 2019 Junior World Luge Championships	International	Germany
1–3	Rugby sevens	(Australia) 2019 Sydney Sevens (WRSS #4) (Australia) 2019 Sydney Women's Sevens (WRWSS #3)	International	New Zealand; New Zealand
1–3	Table tennis	(Puerto Rico) 2019 ITTF Pan-America Cup	Continental	Men: (Brazil) Hugo Calderano; Women: (Puerto Rico) Adriana Díaz
1–10	Freestyle skiing Snowboarding	(United States) FIS Freestyle Ski and Snowboarding World Championships 2019	International	United States
1–15 March	Rugby union	(England) / (France) / (Ireland) / (Italy) / (Scotland) / (Wales) 2019 Six Nations Under 20s Championship	Continental	Ireland
1–16 March	Rugby union	(England) / (France) / (Ireland) / (Italy) / (Scotland) / (Wales) 2019 Six Nations Championship	Continental	Wales
1–17 March	Rugby union	(England) / (France) / (Ireland) / (Italy) / (Scotland) / (Wales) 2019 Women's Six Nations Championship	Continental	England
2–3	Cyclo-cross	(Denmark) 2019 UCI Cyclo-cross World Championships	International	Netherlands
2–3	Table tennis	(Switzerland) 2019 Europe Top 16 Cup	Continental	Men: (Germany) Dimitrij Ovtcharov; Women: (Germany) Petrissa Solja
2–17	Association football	(Niger) 2019 Africa U-20 Cup of Nations	Continental	Mali
2–9 March	Rugby union	(Argentina) / (Brazil) / (Canada) / (Chile) / (United States) / (Uruguay) 2019 Americas Rugby Championship	Continental	Argentina XV
3	American football	(United States) Super Bowl LIII	Domestic	(Massachusetts) New England Patriots
4–17	Alpine skiing	(Sweden) FIS Alpine World Ski Championships 2019	International	Norway & Switzerland (tie)
7–10	Figure skating	(United States) 2019 Four Continents Figure Skating Championships	International	Men: (Japan) Shoma Uno; Ladies: (Japan) Rika Kihira; Pairs: (China) (Sui Wenjing & Han Cong); Ice Dance: (United States) (Madison Chock & Evan Bates)
7–10	Speed skating	(Germany) 2019 World Single Distance Speed Skating Championships	International	Netherlands
9–10	Luge	(Germany) 2019 FIL European Luge Championships	Continental	Germany
9–10	Triathlon	(South Africa) 2019 ITU Triathlon World Cup #1	International	Men: (United Kingdom) Alex Yee; Women: (Japan) Ai Ueda
9–17 March	Rugby union	(Belgium) / (Georgia (country)) / (Germany) / (Romania) / (Russia) / (Spain) 2019 Rugby Europe Championship	Continental	Georgia
10–15	Multi-sport	(Bosnia and Herzegovina) 2019 European Youth Olympic Winter Festival	Continental	Norway
11–17	Badminton	(Australia) 2019 Oceania Badminton Championships	Continental	Men: (New Zealand) Oscar Guo; Women: (Australia) Chen Hsuan-yu
13–17	Badminton	(Denmark) 2019 European Mixed Team Badminton Championships	Continental	Denmark
14–17	Badminton	(Peru) 2019 Pan Am Mixed Team Badminton Championships	Continental	Canada
14–17	Rallying	2019 Rally Sweden (WRC #2)	International	(Estonia) Ott Tänak & Martin Järveoja (Toyota Gazoo Racing WRT)
15–17	Basketball	(Brazil) 2019 FIBA Intercontinental Cup	International	(Greece) AEK Athens
15–17	Futsal	(Portugal) UEFA Women's Futsal Euro 2019	Continental	Spain
15–17	Speed skating	(Italy) 2019 World Junior Speed Skating Championships	International	Netherlands
15–15 November	NASCAR	(United States) 2019 NASCAR Gander Outdoors Truck Series	Domestic	(California) Matt Crafton ( (Ohio) ThorSport Racing)
16	Formula E	Mexico City ePrix (FE #4)	International	(Brazil) Lucas di Grassi (Audi Sport ABT Schaeffler)
16–23	Curling	(Canada) 2019 World Junior Curling Championships	International	Men: Canada (Skip: Tyler Tardi); Women: Russia (Skip: Vlada Rumiantseva)
16–16 November	NASCAR	(United States) 2019 NASCAR Xfinity Series	Domestic	(California) Tyler Reddick ( (North Carolina) Richard Childress Racing)
17	Basketball	(United States) 2019 NBA All-Star Game	Domestic	Team LeBron; MVP: (Washington, D.C.) Kevin Durant ( (California) Golden State Warriors)
17	NASCAR	(United States) 2019 Daytona 500	Domestic	(Florida) Denny Hamlin ( (North Carolina) Joe Gibbs Racing)
17	Rugby league	(England) 2019 World Club Challenge	International	(Australia) Sydney Roosters
17–17 November	NASCAR	(United States) 2019 Monster Energy NASCAR Cup Series	Domestic	(Nevada) Kyle Busch ( (North Carolina) Joe Gibbs Racing)
18–27	Alpine skiing	(Italy) World Junior Alpine Skiing Championships 2019	International	Switzerland
20–24	Biathlon	(Belarus) 2019 IBU Open European Championships	Continental	Sweden
20–3 March	Nordic skiing	(Austria) FIS Nordic World Ski Championships 2019	International	Norway
21–24	Golf	2019 WGC-Mexico Championship	International	(United States) Dustin Johnson
21–6 October	Rallying	(African Union) 2019 African Rally Championship	Continental	Driver: (South Africa) Hergen Fekken; Co-driver: (South Africa) Pierre Arries; Team: (South Africa) Rally Technic
21–8 October	Rally raid	(Qatar) / (United Arab Emirates) / (Kazakhstan) / (Morocco) 2019 FIA World Cup for Cross-Country Rallies	International	Driver: (France) Stéphane Peterhansel; Co-driver: (Germany) Andrea Peterhansel; Team: (Germany) X-raid
23–24	Speed skating	(Netherlands) 2019 World Sprint Speed Skating Championships	International	Men: (Russia) Pavel Kulizhnikov; Women: (Japan) Nao Kodaira
23–2 March	Squash	(United States) 2018–19 PSA Men's World Squash Championship (United States) 2018–19 PSA Women's World Squash Championship	International	Men: (Egypt) Ali Farag; Women: (Egypt) Nour El Sherbini
23–26 October	Motorsport	(European Union) / (Australia) / (Thailand) / (United States) / (Argentina) / (Qatar) 2019 Superbike World Championship	International	(United Kingdom) Jonathan Rea ( (Spain) Kawasaki Motors Racing)
25–10 March	Bobsleigh and Skeleton	(Canada) IBSF World Championships 2019	International	Germany
26–2 March	Archery	(Turkey) 2019 European Archery Indoor Championship	Continental	Russia
27–3 March	Track cycling	(Poland) 2019 UCI Track Cycling World Championships	International	Netherlands

=== March ===
Date	Sport	Venue/Event	Status	Winner/s
1–3	Rugby sevens	(United States) 2019 USA Sevens (WRSS #5)	International	United States
1–3	Athletics	(United Kingdom) 2019 European Athletics Indoor Championships	Continental	Poland
1–3	Darts	(England) 2019 UK Open	International	(England) Nathan Aspinall
2–3	Speed skating	(Canada) 2019 World Allround Speed Skating Championships	International	Men: (Netherlands) Patrick Roest; Women: (Czech Republic) Martina Sábliková
2–12	Multi-sport	(Russia) 2019 Winter Universiade	International	Russia
2–24 November	Motorsport	(Australia) / (New Zealand) 2019 Supercars Championship	Regional	(New Zealand) Scott McLaughlin ( (Australia) DJR Team Penske)
3	Marathon	(Japan) 2019 Tokyo Marathon (WMM #1)	International	Men: (Ethiopia) Birhanu Legese; Women: (Ethiopia) Ruti Aga
3–10	Curling	(Scotland) 2019 World Wheelchair Curling Championship	International	China (Skip: Wang Haitao)
4–10	Biathlon	(Norway) 2019 IBU Junior Open European Championships	Continental	Germany
4–10	Figure skating	(Croatia) 2019 World Junior Figure Skating Championships	International	Men: (United States) Tomoki Hiwatashi; Ladies: Alexandra Trusova; Pairs: Russia (Anastasia Mishina & Aleksandr Galiamov); Ice Dance: Canada (Marjorie Lajoie & Zachary Lagha)
4–10	Wrestling	(Serbia) 2019 European U23 Wrestling Championship	Continental	Russia
4–15	Chess	(Kazakhstan) World Team Chess Championship 2019	International	Russia
4–17	Tennis	(United States) 2019 Indian Wells Masters	International	Men: (Austria) Dominic Thiem; Women: (Canada) Bianca Andreescu
7–10	Rallying	2019 Rally Mexico (WRC #3)	International	(France) Sébastien Ogier & Julien Ingrassia ( (France) Citroën World Rally Team)
7–10	Table tennis	(Portugal) 2019 European Under-21 Table Tennis Championships	Continental	Men: (Greece) Ioannis Sgouropoulos; Women: (Romania) Adina Diaconu
7–17	Beach soccer	(Thailand) 2019 AFC Beach Soccer Championship	Continental	Japan
7–17	Biathlon	(Sweden) Biathlon World Championships 2019	International	Norway
7–23 November	Rallying	(Mexico) / (Canada) / (Venezuela) 2019 NACAM Rally Championship	Continental	
8–9	Triathlon	(United Arab Emirates) 2019 ITU World Triathlon Series #1	International	Men: (Spain) Mario Mola; Women: (United States) Katie Zaferes
8–10	Speed skating	(Bulgaria) 2019 World Short Track Speed Skating Championships	International	Men: (South Korea) Lim Hyo-jun; Women: (Netherlands) Suzanne Schulting
8–15	Weightlifting	(United States) 2019 Youth World Weightlifting Championships	International	Kazakhstan
8–17 November	Rallying	(Argentina) / (Paraguay) / (Brazil) / (Bolivia) / (Uruguay) 2019 Codasur South American Rally Championship	Continental	
9–10	Athletics	(Slovakia) 2019 European Throwing Cup	Continental	Belarus
9–10	Rugby sevens	2019 Canada Sevens (WRSS #6)	International	South Africa
10	Formula E	2019 Hong Kong ePrix (FE #5)	International	(Switzerland) Edoardo Mortara ( (Monaco) Venturi Grand Prix)
10	Motorcycle racing	2019 Qatar motorcycle Grand Prix	International	MotoGP: (Italy) Andrea Dovizioso ( (Italy) Ducati Corse); Moto2: (Italy) Lorenzo Baldassarri ( (United Kingdom) Pons Racing); Moto3: (Japan) Kaito Toba ( (Japan) Honda Team Asia)
10–22 September	IndyCar	(United States) / (Canada) 2019 IndyCar Series	International	(United States) Josef Newgarden ( (United States) Team Penske)
14–17	Golf	(United States) 2019 Players Championship	International	(Northern Ireland) Rory McIlroy
14–17	Para-cycling	(Netherlands) 2019 UCI Para-cycling Track World Championships	International	Great Britain
14–21	Multi-sport	(United Arab Emirates) 2019 Special Olympics World Summer Games	International	
14–23	Multi-sport	(Argentina) 2019 South American Beach Games	Continental	Argentina
14–2 November	Rallying	(Qatar) / (Jordan) / (Lebanon) / (Cyprus) / (Kuwait) 2019 Middle East Rally Championship	Regional	(Qatar) Nasser Al-Attiyah
15–16	Synchronized skating	(Switzerland) 2019 ISU World Junior Synchronized Skating Championships	International	(Russia) Team Junost Junior
16	Triathlon	(Australia) 2019 ITU Triathlon World Cup #2	International	Men: (Canada) Tyler Mislawchuk; Women: (Australia) Ashleigh Gentle
16–24	Curling	(Denmark) 2019 World Women's Curling Championship	International	Switzerland (Skip: Silvana Tirinzoni)
16–25	Shooting	(Croatia) 2019 10m European Shooting Championships	Continental	Russia
17	Formula One	(Australia) 2019 Australian Grand Prix	International	(Finland) Valtteri Bottas ( (Germany) Mercedes)
17–29	Chess	(North Macedonia) 2019 European Individual Chess Championship	Continental	(Russia) Vladislav Artemiev
18–24	Figure skating	(Japan) 2019 World Figure Skating Championships	International	Men: (United States) Nathan Chen; Ladies: (Russia) Alina Zagitova; Pairs: China (Sui Wenjing & Han Cong); Ice Dance: France (Gabriella Papadakis & Guillaume Cizeron)
18–31	Tennis	(United States) 2019 Miami Open	International	Men: (Switzerland) Roger Federer; Women: (Australia) Ashleigh Barty
19–24	Badminton	(Hong Kong) 2019 Badminton Asia Mixed Team Championships	Continental	China
19–24	Snooker	(Wales) 2019 Tour Championship	International	(England) Ronnie O'Sullivan
19–8 April	Basketball	(United States) 2019 NCAA Division I men's basketball tournament	Domestic	Virginia Cavaliers; Final Four MOP: (Indiana) Kyle Guy (Virginia)
21–24	Wrestling	(Mongolia) 2019 Asian U23 Wrestling Championship	Continental	Iran
21–14 April	Association football	(Peru) 2019 South American U-17 Championship	Continental	Argentina
21–10 November	Rallying	(European Union) 2019 European Rally Championship	Continental	ERC: (United Kingdom) Chris Ingram; ERC2: (Argentina) Juan Carlos Alonso; ERC3: (Spain) Efrén Llarena
22–24	Cross-country skiing	(Canada) 2018–19 FIS Cross-Country World Cup Finals	International	Men: (Norway) Johannes Høsflot Klæbo; Women: (Sweden) Stina Nilsson
22–7 April	Basketball	(United States) 2019 NCAA Division I women's basketball tournament	Domestic	(Texas) Baylor Lady Bears; Final Four MOP: (Maryland) Chloe Jackson (Baylor)
23	Formula E	(China) 2019 Sanya ePrix (FE #6)	International	(France) Jean-Éric Vergne ( (China) Techeetah)
23	Road bicycle racing	(Italy) 2019 Milan–San Remo (Monument #1)	International	(France) Julian Alaphilippe ( (Belgium) Deceuninck–Quick-Step)
23–12 May	Cricket	(India) 2019 Indian Premier League (IPL #12)	Domestic	(India) Mumbai Indians
25–31	Ice hockey	(Serbia) 2019 IIHF World U18 Championships Division II – Group B	International	Serbia was promoted to Division II – Group A Belgium was relegated to Division III – Group A
25–31	Ice hockey	(Bulgaria) 2019 IIHF World U18 Championships Division III – Group A	International	Bulgaria was promoted to Division II – Group B New Zealand was relegated to Division III – Group B
26–31	Wrestling	(Tunisia) 2019 African Wrestling Championships	Continental	Freestyle: Tunisia; Greco-Roman: Egypt; Women's freestyle: Nigeria
27–31	Golf	(United States) 2019 WGC-Dell Technologies Match Play	International	(United States) Kevin Kisner
28–31	Rallying	(France) 2019 Tour de Corse (WRC #4)	International	(Belgium) Thierry Neuville & Nicolas Gilsoul ( (South Korea) Hyundai Motorsport)
28–31	Karate	(Spain) 2019 European Karate Championships	Continental	Spain
28–29 September	Baseball	(United States) / (Canada) 2019 Major League Baseball season (Regular)	Domestic	American League: (Texas) Houston Astros; National League: (California) Los Angeles Dodgers
29	Association football	(Qatar) 2019 CAF Super Cup (March)	Continental	(Morocco) Raja Casablanca
29–31	Nine-ball pool	(Gibraltar) 2019 World Pool Masters	International	(Spain) David Alcaide
30	Athletics	(Denmark) 2019 IAAF World Cross Country Championships	International	Men: (Uganda) Joshua Cheptegei; Women: (Kenya) Hellen Obiri
30	Horse racing	(United Arab Emirates) 2019 Dubai World Cup	International	Horse: (Republic of Ireland) Thunder Snow; Jockey: (Belgium) Christophe Soumillon; Trainer: (United Kingdom) Saeed bin Suroor
30–7 April	Curling	(Canada) 2019 World Men's Curling Championship	International	Sweden (Skip: Niklas Edin)
30–1 December	Motorsport	(European Union) / (Bahrain) / (Russia) / (United Arab Emirates) 2019 FIA Formula 2 Championship	International	(Netherlands) Nyck de Vries
31	Formula One	2019 Bahrain Grand Prix	International	(United Kingdom) Lewis Hamilton ( (Germany) Mercedes)
31	Motorcycle racing	(Argentina) 2019 Argentine motorcycle Grand Prix	International	MotoGP: (Spain) Marc Márquez ( (Belgium) Repsol Honda); Moto2: (Italy) Lorenzo Baldassarri ( (United Kingdom) Pons Racing); Moto3: (Spain) Jaume Masiá ( (Italy) Bester Capital Dubai)
31	Triathlon	(New Zealand) 2019 ITU Triathlon World Cup #3	International	Men: (Australia) Luke Willian; Women: (Italy) Angelica Olmo
31–6 April	Ice hockey	(United Arab Emirates) 2019 IIHF World Championship Division III Qualification	International	The United Arab Emirates was promoted to Division III
31–7 April	Futsal	(Argentina) 2019 AMF Futsal Men's World Cup	International	Argentina

=== April ===
Date	Sport	Venue/Event	Status	Winner/s
1–7	Ice hockey	(Romania) 2019 IIHF Women's World Championship Division II – Group B	International	Chinese Taipei was promoted to Division II – Group A Romania was relegated to Division II – Group B Qualification
2–8	Ice hockey	(United Kingdom) 2019 IIHF Women's World Championship Division II – Group A	International	Slovenia was promoted to Division I – Group B Australia was relegated to Division II – Group B
3–7	Show jumping Dressage	(Sweden) 2019 FEI World Cup Show Jumping and Dressage Finals	International	Jumping: (Switzerland) Steve Guerdat; Dressage: (Germany) Isabell Werth
4–7	Golf	(United States) 2019 ANA Inspiration	International	(South Korea) Ko Jin-young
4–14	Ice hockey	(Finland) 2019 IIHF Women's World Championship	International	United States
5–7	Rugby sevens	2019 Hong Kong Sevens (WRSS #7)	International	Fiji
5–7	Table tennis	(Japan) 2019 ITTF-ATTU Asian Cup	Continental	Men: (China) Fan Zhendong; Women: (China) Zhu Yuling
5–8	Athletics	(Egypt) 2019 Arab Athletics Championships	Regional	Bahrain
5–9 November	Rallycross	(European Union) / (United Arab Emirates) / (Canada) / (South Africa) 2019 FIA World Rallycross Championship	International	(Sweden) Timmy Hansen ( (France) Team Peugeot Total)
3 October 2018–6	Ice hockey	(United States) / (Canada) 2018–19 NHL season	Domestic	Presidents' Trophy & East: (Florida) Tampa Bay Lightning; West: (Alberta) Calgary Flames
6	Horse racing	(United Kingdom) 2019 Grand National	International	Horse: (Republic of Ireland) Tiger Roll; Jockey: (Republic of Ireland) Davy Russell; Trainer: (Republic of Ireland) Gordon Elliott
6–12	Ice hockey	(China) 2019 IIHF Women's World Championship Division I – Group B	International	Netherlands was promoted to Division I – Group A Latvia was relegated to Division II – Group A
6–13	Weightlifting	(Georgia (country)) 2019 European Weightlifting Championships	Continental	Russia
6–14	Fencing	(Poland) 2019 Junior World Fencing Championships	International	Russia
6–15 December	Motorsport	(European Union) / (Morocco) / (China) / (Japan) / (Macau) / (Malaysia) 2019 World Touring Car Cup	International	
7	Road bicycle racing	(Belgium) 2019 Tour of Flanders (Monument #2)	International	(Italy) Alberto Bettiol ( (United States) EF Education First)
7–13	Ice hockey	(Lithuania) 2019 IIHF World U18 Championships Division II – Group A	International	Poland was promoted to Division I – Group B Spain was relegated to Division II – Group B
7–13	Ice hockey	(Hungary) 2019 IIHF Women's World Championship Division I – Group A	International	Hungary & Denmark were promoted to World Championship; Italy was relegated to Division I – Group B
8–14	Wrestling	(Romania) 2019 European Wrestling Championships	Continental	Freestyle: Russia; Greco-Roman: Russia; Women's freestyle: Ukraine
9–12	Ice hockey	(South Africa) 2019 IIHF World U18 Championships Division III – Group B	International	Chinese Taipei was promoted to Division III – Group A
9–15	Ice hockey	(Serbia) 2019 IIHF World Championship Division II – Group A	International	Serbia was promoted to Division I – Group B Belgium was relegated to Division II – Group B
16 October 2018–10	Basketball	(United States) / (Canada) 2018–19 NBA season	Domestic	(Canada) Toronto Raptors
10	Basketball	(United States) 2019 WNBA draft	Domestic	#1 pick: (Indiana) Jackie Young (To the (Nevada) Las Vegas Aces from (Indiana) Notre Dame)
10–14	Artistic gymnastics	(Poland) 2019 European Artistic Gymnastics Championships	Continental	Russia
10–23	Chess	(Turkey) 2019 European Individual Women Chess Championship	Continental	(Russia) Alina Kashlinskaya
10–12 June	Ice hockey	(United States) / (Canada) 2019 Stanley Cup playoffs	Domestic	(Missouri) St. Louis Blues; Conn Smythe Trophy: (Ontario) Ryan O'Reilly (St. Louis Blues)
11–14	Golf	(United States) 2019 Masters Tournament	International	(United States) Tiger Woods
11–14	Figure skating	(Japan) 2019 ISU World Team Trophy	International	United States
12–13	Synchronized skating	(Finland) 2019 ISU World Synchronized Skating Championships	International	(Russia) Paradise
12–27 October	Rallying	(New Zealand) / (Australia) / (Japan) / (Indonesia) / (China) 2019 Asia-Pacific Rally Championship	International	Asia Rally Cup: (New Zealand) Michael Young; Pacific Rally Cup: (New Zealand) Hayden Paddon
13	Formula E	(Italy) Rome ePrix (FE #7)	International	(New Zealand) Mitch Evans ( (United Kingdom) Jaguar Racing)
13–14	Rugby sevens	2019 Singapore Sevens (WRSS #8)	International	South Africa
14	Formula One	(China) 2019 Chinese Grand Prix	International	(United Kingdom) Lewis Hamilton ( (Germany) Mercedes)
14	Motorcycle racing	(United States) 2019 Motorcycle Grand Prix of the Americas	International	MotoGP: (Spain) Álex Rins ( (Japan) Suzuki MotoGP); Moto2: (Switzerland) Thomas Lüthi ( (Germany) Dynavolt Intact GP); Moto3: (Spain) Arón Canet ( (Italy) Sterilgarda Max Racing Team)
14	Road bicycle racing	(France) 2019 Paris–Roubaix (Monument #3)	International	(Belgium) Philippe Gilbert ( (Belgium) Deceuninck–Quick-Step)
14–20	Ice hockey	(France) 2019 IIHF World U18 Championships Division I – Group A	International	Germany was promoted to Top Division; Ukraine was relegated to Division I – Group B
14–20	Ice hockey	(Hungary) 2019 IIHF World U18 Championships Division I – Group B	International	Japan was promoted to Division I – Group A Great Britain was relegated to Division II – Group A
14–28	Association football	(Tanzania) 2019 Africa U-17 Cup of Nations	Continental	Cameroon
14–29 September	Motorsport	(European Union) 2019 Blancpain GT Series	International	Italy (Marco Mapelli & Andrea Caldarelli) ( (China) Orange1 FFF Racing Team)
14–27 October	Motorsport	(European Union) 2019 European Le Mans Series	International	LMP2: (France) IDEC Sport; LMP3: (United States) EuroInternational; LMGTE: (Switzerland) Luzich Racing
15	Marathon	(United States) 2019 Boston Marathon (WMM #2)	International	Men: (Kenya) Lawrence Cherono; Women: (Ethiopia) Worknesh Degefa
15–21	Tennis	(Monaco) 2019 Monte-Carlo Masters	International	(Italy) Fabio Fognini
18–21	Wrestling	(Argentina) 2019 Pan American Wrestling Championships	Continental	United States
18–28	Ice hockey	(Sweden) 2019 IIHF World U18 Championships	International	Sweden
1 September 2018–19	Ice hockey	(Russia) / (Kazakhstan) / (Latvia) / (Belarus) / (Slovakia) / (Finland) / (China) 2018–19 KHL season	International	Gagarin Cup: (Russia) CSKA
20–21	Rugby sevens	2019 Japan Women's Sevens (WRWSS #4)	International	Canada
20–23	Judo	(United Arab Emirates) 2019 Asian-Pacific Judo Championships	Continental	Japan
20–27	Curling	(Norway) 2019 World Mixed Doubles Curling Championship (Norway) 2019 World Senior Curling Championships	International	Mixed Doubles: Sweden (Anna Hasselborg & Oskar Eriksson); Senior Men: Canada (Skip: Bryan Cochrane); Senior Women: Canada (Skip: Sherry Anderson)
20–28	Weightlifting	(China) 2019 Asian Weightlifting Championships	Continental	China
20–6 May	Snooker	(England) 2019 World Snooker Championship (Triple Crown #3)	International	(England) Judd Trump
21–24	Athletics	(Qatar) 2019 Asian Athletics Championships	Continental	Bahrain
21–27	Ice hockey	(Mexico) 2019 IIHF World Championship Division II – Group B	International	Israel was promoted to Division II – Group A North Korea was relegated to Division III
21–28	Table tennis	(Hungary) 2019 World Table Tennis Championships	International	Men: (China) Ma Long; Women: (China) Liu Shiwen
22–28	Badminton	(Nigeria) 2019 African Badminton Championships	Continental	Nigeria
22–28	Ice hockey	(Bulgaria) 2019 IIHF World Championship Division III	International	Bulgaria was promoted to Division II – Group B South Africa was relegated to Division III Qualification
23–27	Weightlifting	(Guatemala) 2019 Pan American Weightlifting Championships	Continental	United States
23–28	Badminton	(China) 2019 Badminton Asia Championships	Continental	Men: (Japan) Kento Momota; Women: (Japan) Akane Yamaguchi
23–28	Wrestling	(China) 2019 Asian Wrestling Championships	Continental	Iran
23–28	Road bicycle racing	(Uzbekistan) 2019 Asian Road Cycling Championships	Continental	Kazakhstan
23–1 May	Association football	(Mexico) 2019 CONCACAF Champions League Finals	Continental	(Mexico) Monterrey
25–27	American football	(United States) 2019 NFL draft	Domestic	#1 pick: (Texas) Kyler Murray (to the Arizona Cardinals from the Oklahoma Sooners)
25–27	Judo	(Peru) 2019 Pan American Judo Championships	Continental	Brazil
25–28	Badminton	(Mexico) 2019 Pan Am Individual Badminton Championships	Continental	Men: (Cuba) Osleni Guerrero; Women: (Canada) Michelle Li
25–28	Judo	(South Africa) 2019 African Judo Championships	Continental	Algeria
25–28	Rallying	2019 Rally Argentina (WRC #5)	International	(Belgium) Thierry Neuville & Nicolas Gilsoul ( (South Korea) Hyundai Shell Mobis WRT)
25–29	Weightlifting	(Egypt) 2019 African Weightlifting Championships	Continental	Egypt
26–4 May	Rugby union	(Australia) 2019 Oceania Rugby Under 20 Championship	Continental	Australia
27	Formula E	(France) 2019 Paris ePrix (FE #8)	International	(Netherlands) Robin Frijns ( (United Kingdom) Envision Virgin Racing)
27	Triathlon	(Bermuda) 2019 ITU World Triathlon Series #2	International	Men: (France) Dorian Coninx; Women: (United States) Katie Zaferes
27–4 May	Triathlon	(Spain) 2019 ITU Multisport World Championships	International	Spain
27–13 October	Motorsport	(European Union) 2019 International GT Open	International	(Italy) Giacomo Altoè & (Spain) Albert Costa ( (Switzerland) Emil Frey Racing)
28 August 2018–28	Futsal	(Europe) 2018–19 UEFA Futsal Champions League	Continental	(Portugal) Sporting CP
28	Formula One	2019 Azerbaijan Grand Prix	International	(Finland) Valtteri Bottas ( (Germany) Mercedes)
28	Marathon	(United Kingdom) 2019 London Marathon (WMM #3)	International	Men: (Kenya) Eliud Kipchoge; Women: (Kenya) Brigid Kosgei
28	Road bicycle racing	(Belgium) 2019 Liège–Bastogne–Liège (Monument #4)	International	(Denmark) Jakob Fuglsang ( (Kazakhstan) Astana Pro Team)
28–4 May	Ice hockey	(Estonia) 2019 IIHF World Championship Division I – Group B	International	Romania was promoted to Division I – Group A Netherlands was relegated to Division II – Group A
18 September 2018–29	Association football	(Europe) 2018–19 UEFA Youth League	Continental	(Portugal) FC Porto
29–5 May	Ice hockey	(Kazakhstan) 2019 IIHF World Championship Division I – Group A	International	Kazakhstan & Belarus were promoted to Top Division; Lithuania was relegated to Division I – Group B

=== May ===
Date	Sport	Venue/Event	Status	Winner/s
1–5	Squash	(Malaysia) 2019 Men's Asian Individual Squash Championships (Malaysia) 2019 Women's Asian Individual Squash Championships	Continental	Men: (India) Saurav Ghosal; Women: (India) Joshna Chinappa
1–7	Softball	(Indonesia) 2019 Asian Women's Softball Championship	Continental	Japan
1–16	Association football	(United States) 2019 CONCACAF U-17 Championship	Continental	Mexico
3	Athletics	(Qatar) Doha Diamond League (Diamond League #1)	International	United States
3–5	Basketball	(Belgium) 2019 Basketball Champions League Final Four	Continental	(Italy) Segafredo Virtus Bologna
3–12	Tennis	(Spain) 2019 Madrid Open	International	Men: (Serbia) Novak Djokovic; Women: (Netherlands) Kiki Bertens
3–19	Association football	(Republic of Ireland) 2019 UEFA European Under-17 Championship	Continental	Netherlands
4	Horse racing	(United States) 2019 Kentucky Derby	International	Horse: (United States) Country House; Jockey: (France) Flavien Prat; Trainer: (United States) Bill Mott
4–5	Triathlon	(Spain) 2019 ITU Triathlon World Cup #4	International	Men: (Germany) Justus Nieschlag; Women: (France) Emilie Morier
4–6 October	Motorsport	(European Union) 2019 Deutsche Tourenwagen Masters	International	(Germany) René Rast ( (Germany) Team Rosberg)
5	Motorcycle racing	(Spain) 2019 Spanish motorcycle Grand Prix	International	MotoGP: (Spain) Marc Márquez ( (Japan) Repsol Honda Team); Moto2: (Italy) Lorenzo Baldassarri ( (Spain) Flexbox HP40); Moto3: (Italy) Niccolò Antonelli ( (Italy) SIC58 Squadra Corse)
5–17	Association football	(Bulgaria) 2019 UEFA Women's Under-17 Championship	Continental	Germany
8–12	Curling	(China) 2018–19 Curling World Cup – Grand Final	International	Men: Canada (Skip: Kevin Koe); Women: Canada (Skip: Jennifer Jones); Mixed doubles: Norway (Magnus Nedregotten & Kristin Skaslien)
9–12	Rallying	2019 Rally Chile (WRC #6)	International	(Estonia) Ott Tänak & Martin Järveoja ( (Japan) Toyota Gazoo Racing WRT)
9–13	Golf	(United States) The Tradition	International	(United States) Steve Stricker
10–26	Ice hockey	(Slovakia) 2019 IIHF World Championship	International	Finland
11	Association football	(New Caledonia) 2019 OFC Champions League Final	Continental	(New Caledonia) Hienghène Sport
11	Formula E	2019 Monaco ePrix (FE #9)	International	(France) Jean-Éric Vergne ( (China) DS Techeetah Formula E Team)
11	Rugby union	(England) 2019 European Rugby Champions Cup Final	Continental	(England) Saracens
11–12	Athletics	(Japan) 2019 IAAF World Relays	International	United States
11–12	Rugby sevens	2019 Canada Women's Sevens (WRWSS #5)	International	New Zealand
11–12	Triathlon	(China) 2019 ITU Triathlon World Cup #5	International	Men: (Australia) Matthew Hauser; Women: (Germany) Laura Lindemann
11–2 June	Road bicycle racing	(Italy) 2019 Giro d'Italia (Grand Tour #1)	International	(Ecuador) Richard Carapaz ( (Spain) Movistar Team)
11–29 September	Motorsport	(European Union) / (Russia) 2019 FIA Formula 3 Championship	International	(Russia) Robert Shwartzman ( (Italy) Prema Powerteam)
12	Formula One	(Spain) 2019 Spanish Grand Prix	International	(United Kingdom) Lewis Hamilton ( (Germany) Mercedes)
13–19	Beach soccer	(Mexico) 2019 CONCACAF Beach Soccer Championship	Continental	Mexico
13–19	Tennis	(Italy) 2019 Italian Open	International	Men: (Spain) Rafael Nadal; Women: (Czech Republic) Karolína Plíšková
15–19	Taekwondo	(United Kingdom) 2019 World Taekwondo Championships	International	South Korea
16–19	Rhythmic gymnastics	(Azerbaijan) 2019 Rhythmic Gymnastics European Championships	Continental	Russia
16–19	Golf	(United States) 2019 PGA Championship	International	(United States) Brooks Koepka
16–19	Golf	(United States) 2019 U.S. Senior Women's Open	International	(Sweden) Helen Alfredsson
16–26	Nine-pin bowling	(Czech Republic) 2019 Nine-pin Bowling World Team Championships	International	Men: Serbia; Women: Croatia
17–19	Aesthetic group gymnastics	(Spain) 2019 World Aesthetic Gymnastics Championships	International	Senior: Russia; Junior: Finland
17–19	Basketball	(Spain) 2019 EuroLeague Final Four	Continental	(Russia) CSKA Moscow
18	Association football	(Hungary) 2019 UEFA Women's Champions League Final	Continental	(France) Lyon
18	Horse racing	(United States) 2019 Preakness Stakes	Domestic	Horse: (United States) War of Will; Jockey: (United States) Tyler Gaffalione; Trainer: (United States) Mark E. Casse
18	Athletics	(China) IAAF Diamond League Shanghai (Diamond League #2)	International	United States
18	Triathlon	(Italy) 2019 ITU Triathlon World Cup #6	International	Men: (United Kingdom) Alistair Brownlee; Women: (United Kingdom) Sophie Coldwell
18–19	Triathlon	(Japan) 2019 ITU World Triathlon Series #3	International	Men: (France) Vincent Luis; Women: (United States) Katie Zaferes
18–19	Rowing	(Germany) 2019 European Rowing Junior Championships	Continental	Germany
18–29 June	Rugby union	(Hong Kong) / (Malaysia) / (South Korea) 2019 Asia Rugby Championship	Continental	Hong Kong
19	Motorcycle racing	(France) 2019 French motorcycle Grand Prix	International	MotoGP: (Spain) Marc Márquez ( (Japan) Repsol Honda Team); Moto2: (Spain) Álex Márquez ( (Belgium) EG 0,0 Marc VDS); Moto3: (United Kingdom) John McPhee ( (Japan) Repsol Honda Team)
19	Athletics	(Lithuania) 2019 European Race Walking Cup	Continental	Italy
19–26	Badminton	(China) 2019 Sudirman Cup	International	China
19–28 September	NASCAR	(Canada) / (United States) 2019 NASCAR Pinty's Series	Domestic	(Quebec) Andrew Ranger
22–30	Association football	(Brazil) / (Argentina) 2019 Recopa Sudamericana	Continental	(Argentina) River Plate
23–26	Golf	(United States) Senior PGA Championship	International	(United States) Ken Tanigawa
23–15 June	Association football	(Poland) 2019 FIFA U-20 World Cup	International	Ukraine
24–26	3x3 basketball	(China) 2019 FIBA 3x3 Asia Cup	Continental	Men: Australia; Women: Australia
24–26	Aerobic gymnastics	(Azerbaijan) 2019 Aerobic Gymnastics European Championships	Continental	Russia
24–26	Athletics	(Peru) 2019 South American Championships in Athletics	Continental	Brazil
24–31	Association football	(Morocco) / (Tunisia) 2019 CAF Champions League Final	Continental	(Tunisia) Espérance de Tunis
24–8 September	Basketball	(United States) 2019 WNBA season	Domestic	Eastern Conference RS: (Washington, D.C.) Washington Mystics; Western Conference RS: (California) Los Angeles Sparks
25	Formula E	(Germany) 2019 Berlin ePrix (FE #10)	International	(Brazil) Lucas di Grassi ( (Germany) Audi Sport ABT Schaeffler)
25–26	Rugby sevens	(England) 2019 London Sevens (WRSS #9)	International	Fiji
25–26	Table tennis	(French Polynesia) 2019 ITTF-Oceania Cup	Continental	Men: (Australia) Hu Heming; Women: (Australia) Jian Fang Lay
25–6 October	Motorsport	(European Union) 2019 European Truck Racing Championship	Continental	(Germany) Jochen Hahn ( (Germany) Team Hahn Racing)
26	Formula One	2019 Monaco Grand Prix	International	(United Kingdom) Lewis Hamilton ( (Germany) Mercedes)
26–9 June	Tennis	(France) 2019 French Open (Grand Slam #2)	International	Men: (Spain) Rafael Nadal; Women: (Australia) Ashleigh Barty
27–1 June	Multi-sport	(Montenegro) 2019 Games of the Small States of Europe	Continental	Luxembourg
28–2 June	Handball	(Mexico) 2019 Nor.Ca. Women's Handball Championship	Continental	Cuba
29	Association football	(Azerbaijan) 2019 UEFA Europa League Final	Continental	(England) Chelsea
29–2 June	Fencing	(Bulgaria) 2019 European Fencing Under 23 Championships	Continental	Russia
30	Athletics	(Sweden) Bauhaus-Galan (Diamond League #3)	International	United States
30–2 June	Canoe slalom	(France) 2019 European Canoe Slalom Championships	Continental	Czech Republic
30–2 June	Golf	(United States) 2019 U.S. Women's Open	International	(South Korea) Lee Jeong-eun
30–2 June	Rallying	2019 Rally de Portugal (WRC #7)	International	(Estonia) Ott Tänak & Martin Järveoja ( (Japan) Toyota Gazoo Racing WRT)
30–2 June	Rhythmic gymnastics	(Colombia) 2019 South American Rhythmic Gymnastics Championships	Continental	Brazil
30–15 July	Cricket	(England) / (Wales) 2019 Cricket World Cup	International	England
31–2 June	Triathlon	(Netherlands) 2019 European Triathlon Championships	Continental	Men: (United Kingdom) Alistair Brownlee; Women: (United Kingdom) Beth Potter
31–2 June	Rowing	(Switzerland) 2019 European Rowing Championships	Continental	Germany

=== June ===
Date	Sport	Venue/Event	Status	Winner/s
1	Association football	(Spain) 2019 UEFA Champions League Final	Continental	(England) Liverpool
1	Horse racing	(United Kingdom) 2019 Epsom Derby	International	Horse: (Republic of Ireland) Anthony Van Dyck; Jockey: (Republic of Ireland) Seamie Heffernan; Trainer: (Republic of Ireland) Aidan O'Brien
1	Professional boxing	(United States) Anthony Joshua vs. Andy Ruiz Jr.	International	(United States) / (Mexico) Andy Ruiz Jr.
1–2	Rugby sevens	(France) 2019 Paris Sevens (WRSS #10)	International	Fiji
1–8	Weightlifting	(Fiji) 2019 Junior World Weightlifting Championships	International	China
2	Motorcycle racing	(Italy) 2019 Italian motorcycle Grand Prix	International	MotoGP: (Italy) Danilo Petrucci ( (Italy) Ducati Corse); Moto2: (Spain) Álex Márquez ( (Belgium) Marc VDS Racing Team); Moto3: (Italy) Tony Arbolino ( (Italy) VNE Snipers)
3–9	Amateur wrestling	(Spain) 2019 European Junior Wrestling Championships	Continental	Freestyle: Russia; Greco-Roman: Georgia; Women's freestyle: Russia
3–9	Basketball	(Brazil) 2019 FIBA Under-16 Americas Championship	Continental	United States
4–9	Water polo	(Hungary) 2019 FINA Women's Water Polo World League (Super Final)	International	United States
4–9	Modern pentathlon	(Poland) 2019 Modern Pentathlon Junior European Championships	Continental	Men: (Russia) Andrei Zuev; Women: (Russia) Adelina Ibatullina
4–22	Rugby union	(Argentina) 2019 World Rugby Under 20 Championship	International	France
5–9	Association football	(Portugal) 2019 UEFA Nations League Finals	Continental	Portugal
6	Athletics	(Italy) Golden Gala Pietro Mennea (Diamond League #4)	International	United States
6–9	Darts	(Germany) 2019 PDC World Cup of Darts	International	Scotland (Gary Anderson & Peter Wright)
7–7 July	Association football	(France) 2019 FIFA Women's World Cup	International	United States
8	Horse racing	(United States) 2019 Belmont Stakes	International	Horse: (United States) Sir Winston; Jockey: (Dominican Republic) Joel Rosario; Trainer: (United States) Mark E. Casse
8–9	Triathlon	(United Kingdom) 2019 ITU World Triathlon Series #4	International	Men: (Australia) Jacob Birtwhistle; Women: (United Kingdom) Georgia Taylor-Brown
8–16	Handball	(Georgia (country)) 2019 IHF Emerging Nations Championship	International	Georgia
9	Formula One	(Canada) 2019 Canadian Grand Prix	International	(United Kingdom) Lewis Hamilton ( (Germany) Mercedes)
9	Triathlon	(Mexico) 2019 ITU Triathlon World Cup #7	International	Men: (Canada) Tyler Mislawchuk; Women: (United States) Summer Rappaport
9–14	Squash	(Egypt) 2019 Men's PSA World Tour Finals (Egypt) 2019 Women's PSA World Tour Finals	International	Men: (Egypt) Karim Abdel Gawad; Women: (Egypt) Raneem El Weleily
9–16	Modern pentathlon	(Lithuania) 2019 Modern Pentathlon Youth European Championships	Continental	Russia
10–16	Archery	(Netherlands) 2019 World Archery Championships	International	South Korea
13	Athletics	(Norway) Bislett Games (Diamond League #5)	International	United States
13–16	Golf	(United States) 2019 U.S. Open	International	(United States) Gary Woodland
13–16	Rallying	(Italy) 2019 Rally Italia Sardegna (WRC #8)	International	(Spain) Dani Sordo & Carlos del Barrio ( (South Korea) Hyundai Shell Mobis WRT)
13–18	Fencing	(Japan) 2019 Asian Fencing Championships	Continental	South Korea
13–23	Softball	(Czech Republic) 2019 Men's Softball World Championship	International	Argentina
14–16	Athletics	(Colombia) 2019 South American U20 Championships in Athletics	Continental	Brazil
14–23	Multi-sport	(Cape Verde) 2019 African Beach Games	Continental	Morocco
14–7 July	Association football	(Brazil) 2019 Copa América	Continental	Brazil
15–16	Endurance racing	(France) 2019 24 Hours of Le Mans	International	(Spain) Fernando Alonso, (Switzerland) Sébastien Buemi & (Japan) Kazuki Nakajima ( (Japan) Toyota Gazoo Racing)
15–16	Rugby sevens	2019 France Women's Sevens (WRWSS #6)	International	United States
15–16	Triathlon	(Kazakhstan) 2019 ITU Triathlon World Cup #8	International	Men: (Australia) Matthew Hauser; Women: (Japan) Ai Ueda
15–7 July	Association football	(United States) / (Costa Rica) / (Jamaica) 2019 CONCACAF Gold Cup	Continental	Mexico
5 May 2018–16	Endurance racing	(European Union) / (Japan) / (China) / (United States) 2018–19 FIA World Endurance Championship	International	LMP: (Spain) Fernando Alonso, (Switzerland) Sébastien Buemi, & (Japan) Kazuki Nakajima; GTE: (Denmark) Michael Christensen & (France) Kévin Estre
16	Athletics	(Morocco) Meeting International Mohammed VI d'Athlétisme de Rabat (Diamond League #6)	International	Ethiopia
16	Motorcycle racing	(Catalonia) 2019 Catalan motorcycle Grand Prix	International	MotoGP: (Spain) Marc Márquez ( (Belgium) Repsol Honda); Moto2: (Spain) Álex Márquez ( (Belgium) Marc VDS Racing Team); Moto3: (Spain) Marcos Ramírez ( (Luxembourg) Leopard Racing)
16–21	Volleyball	(Mexico) 2019 Men's Pan-American Volleyball Cup	Continental	Cuba
16–22	Basketball	(Chile) 2019 FIBA Under-16 Women's Americas Championship	Continental	United States
16–30	Association football	(Italy) / (San Marino) 2019 UEFA European Under-21 Championship	Continental	Spain
17–22	Beach soccer	(French Polynesia) 2019 OFC Beach Soccer Nations Cup	Continental	Tahiti
17–22	Fencing	(Germany) 2019 European Fencing Championships	Continental	Russia
18–23	3x3 basketball	(Netherlands) 2019 FIBA 3x3 World Cup	International	Men: United States; Women: China
18–23	Artistic gymnastics	(Chile) 2019 South American Artistic Gymnastics Championships	Continental	Brazil
18–23	Water polo	(Serbia) 2019 FINA Men's Water Polo World League (Super Final)	International	Serbia
19–22	Artistic gymnastics	(Mongolia) 2019 Asian Artistic Gymnastics Championships	Continental	China
19–23	Beach volleyball	(Thailand) 2019 FIVB Beach Volleyball U21 World Championships	International	Men: Brazil; Women: Brazil
20	Basketball	(United States) 2019 NBA draft	International	#1: (United States) Zion Williamson (to the (Louisiana) New Orleans Pelicans from the (North Carolina) Duke Blue Devils)
20–23	Golf	(United States) 2019 Women's PGA Championship	International	(Australia) Hannah Green
20–23	Rhythmic gymnastics	(Thailand) 2019 Asian Rhythmic Gymnastics Championships	Continental	China
21–22	Ice hockey	(Canada) 2019 NHL entry draft	International	#1: (United States) Jack Hughes (to the New Jersey Devils from the (Michigan) U.S. NTDP)
21–30	Multi-sport	(Belarus) 2019 European Games	Continental	Russia
21–19 July	Association football	(Egypt) 2019 Africa Cup of Nations	Continental	Algeria
22	Formula E	(Switzerland) 2019 Swiss ePrix (FE #11)	International	(France) Jean-Éric Vergne ( (China) Techeetah)
22–25	Judo	(Belarus) 2019 European Judo Championships	Continental	Russia
23	Formula One	(France) 2019 French Grand Prix	International	(United Kingdom) Lewis Hamilton ( (Germany) Mercedes)
23	Triathlon	(Belgium) 2019 ITU Triathlon World Cup #9	International	Men: (New Zealand) Tayler Reid; Women: (Germany) Lisa Tertsch
24–28	Fencing	(Mali) 2019 African Fencing Championships	Continental	Tunisia
24–30	Snooker	(China) 2019 World Cup	International	Scotland (John Higgins & Stephen Maguire)
25–30	Pool	(United Kingdom) 2019 World Cup of Pool	International	Austria (Mario He & Albin Ouschan)
26–31 July	Cricket	(England) 2019 Women's Ashes	International	Australia
26–30	Volleyball	(Peru) 2019 FIVB Volleyball Women's Challenger Cup	International	Canada
27–30	Artistic gymnastics	(Hungary) 2019 Junior World Artistic Gymnastics Championships	International	Russia
27–30	Field hockey	(Netherlands) 2019 Men's FIH Pro League Grand Final (Netherlands) 2019 Women's FIH Pro League Grand Final	International	Men: Australia; Women: Netherlands
27–30	Golf	(United States) U.S. Senior Open	International	(United States) Steve Stricker
27–2 July	Fencing	(Canada) 2019 Pan American Fencing Championships	Continental	United States
27–7 July	Basketball	(Serbia) / (Latvia) FIBA Women's EuroBasket 2019	Continental	Spain
28–7 July	Beach volleyball	(Germany) 2019 Beach Volleyball World Championships	International	Men: Russia (Oleg Stoyanovskiy & Viacheslav Krasilnikov); Women: Canada (Sarah Pavan & Melissa Humana-Paredes)
28–14 July	Rugby union	(United States) 2019 Women's Rugby Super Series	International	New Zealand
29	Triathlon	(Canada) 2019 ITU World Triathlon Series #5	International	Men: (Belgium) Jelle Geens; Women: (United States) Katie Zaferes
29–7 July	Basketball	(Greece) 2019 FIBA Under-19 Basketball World Cup	International	United States
30	Athletics	(United States) Prefontaine Classic (Diamond League #7)	International	United States
30	Formula One	(Austria) 2019 Austrian Grand Prix	International	(Netherlands) Max Verstappen ( (Austria) Red Bull Racing)
30	Motorcycle racing	(Netherlands) 2019 Dutch TT	International	MotoGP: (Spain) Maverick Viñales ( (Japan) Yamaha Motor Racing); Moto2: (Spain) Augusto Fernández ( (United Kingdom) Pons Racing); Moto3: (Italy) Tony Arbolino ( (Italy) VNE Snipers)
30–6 July	Softball	(Czech Republic) 2019 ESF Women's Championship	Continental	Italy

=== July ===
Date	Sport	Venue/Event	Status	Winner/s
1–14	Tennis	(United Kingdom) 2019 Wimbledon Championships (Grand Slam #3)	International	Men: (Serbia) Novak Djokovic; Women: (Romania) Simona Halep
2–7	Beach handball	(Poland) 2019 European Beach Handball Championship	Continental	Men: Denmark; Women: Denmark
2–10	Shooting	(Italy) 2019 World Shotgun Championships	International	Italy
3–7	Swimming	(Russia) 2019 European Junior Swimming Championships	Continental	Russia
3–7	Volleyball	(Slovenia) 2019 FIVB Volleyball Men's Challenger Cup	International	Slovenia
3–7	Volleyball	(China) 2019 FIVB Volleyball Women's Nations League (Final Round)	International	United States
3–14	Multi-sport	(Italy) 2019 Summer Universiade	International	Japan
4–7	Canoe slalom	(Slovakia) 2019 European Junior and U23 Canoe Slalom Championships	Continental	France
4–9	Sailing	(Japan) 2019 Laser World Championship	International	(Australia) Tom Burton
5	Athletics	(Switzerland) Athletissima (Diamond League #8)	International	United States
5–7	Athletics	(Mexico) 2019 NACAC Under-23 Championships in Athletics	Continental	United States
5–14	Basketball	(Cape Verde) 2019 FIBA Under-16 African Championship	Continental	Egypt
5–14	Road bicycle racing	(Italy) 2019 Giro Rosa	International	(Netherlands) Annemiek van Vleuten
6	Athletics	(United Kingdom) 2019 European 10,000m Cup	Continental	Men: (Italy) Yemaneberhan Crippa; Women: (United Kingdom) Stephanie Twell
6–7	Athletics	(Ukraine) 2019 European Combined Events Team Championships (Super League)	Continental	Estonia
6–7	Triathlon	(Germany) 2019 ITU World Triathlon Series #6	International	Men: (Australia) Jacob Birtwhistle; Women: (United Kingdom) Non Stanford
6–12	Multi-sport	(Gibraltar) 2019 Island Games	International	Jersey
6–14	Basketball	(Bosnia and Herzegovina) 2019 FIBA U18 Women's European Championship	Continental	Italy
6–14	Roller hockey	(Spain) 2019 Roller Hockey World Cup (Spain) 2019 Women's Roller Hockey World Cup	International	Men: Portugal; Women: Spain
6–14	Volleyball	(Peru) 2019 Women's Pan-American Volleyball Cup	Continental	United States
6–28	Road bicycle racing	2019 Tour de France (Grand Tour #2)	International	(Colombia) Egan Bernal ( (United Kingdom) Team Ineos)
7	Motorcycle racing	(Germany) 2019 German motorcycle Grand Prix	International	MotoGP: (Spain) Marc Márquez ( (Belgium) Repsol Honda); Moto2: (Spain) Álex Márquez ( (Belgium) Marc VDS Racing Team); Moto3: (Italy) Lorenzo Dalla Porta ( (Luxembourg) Leopard Racing)
7–16	Table tennis	(Czech Republic) 2019 Table Tennis European Youth Championships	Continental	Russia
8–20	Multi-sport	(Samoa) 2019 Pacific Games	Continental	New Caledonia
9	Baseball	(United States) 2019 Major League Baseball All-Star Game	Domestic	American League; MVP: (United States) Shane Bieber ( (Ohio) Cleveland Indians); Home Run Derby: (United States) Pete Alonso ( (New York (state)) New York Mets)
9–14	Track cycling	(Belgium) 2019 UEC European Track Championships (under-23 & junior)	Continental	Germany
9–14	Volleyball	(Egypt) 2019 Women's African Volleyball Championship	Continental	Cameroon
9–21	Rugby union	(Brazil) 2019 World Rugby Under 20 Trophy	International	Japan
10–14	Volleyball	(United States) 2019 FIVB Volleyball Men's Nations League (Final Round)	International	Russia
11–14	Athletics	(Sweden) 2019 European Athletics U23 Championships	Continental	Germany
11–14	Golf	(United States) Senior Players Championship	International	(South Africa) Retief Goosen
11–14	Canoe sprint	(Czech Republic) 2019 European Junior & U23 Canoe Sprint Championships	Continental	Belarus
11–14	BMX	(Latvia) 2019 European BMX Championships	Continental	Men: (Netherlands) Niek Kimmann; Women: (Netherlands) Laura Smulders
11–21	Handball	(Hungary) 2019 Women's U-19 European Handball Championship	Continental	Hungary
12	Athletics	(Monaco) Herculis (Diamond League #9)	International	United States
12–21	Netball	(England) 2019 Netball World Cup	International	New Zealand
12–21	Volleyball	(Mexico) 2019 FIVB Volleyball Women's U20 World Championship	International	Japan
12–28	Aquatics	(South Korea) 2019 World Aquatics Championships	International	China
13–14	Formula E	(United States) 2019 New York City ePrix (FE #12 & #13)	International	Race 1: (Switzerland) Sébastien Buemi ( (France) DAMS); Race 2: (Netherlands) Robin Frijns ( (United Kingdom) Envision Virgin Racing)
13–14	Triathlon	(Hungary) 2019 ITU Triathlon World Cup #10	International	Men: (United States) Eli Hemming; Women: (Australia) Emma Jeffcoat
13–21	Basketball	(Israel) 2019 FIBA U20 European Championship	Continental	Israel
13–21	Field hockey	(Spain) 2019 Women's EuroHockey Junior Championship	Continental	Spain
13–21	Sailing	(Poland) 2019 Youth Sailing World Championships	International	United States; Nations Trophy: Spain
14	Formula One	(United Kingdom) 2019 British Grand Prix	International	(United Kingdom) Lewis Hamilton ( (Germany) Mercedes)
14–27	Association football	(Armenia) 2019 UEFA European Under-19 Championship	Continental	Spain
15–21	Field hockey	(Spain) 2019 Men's EuroHockey Junior Championship	Continental	Germany
15–21	Indoor hockey	(Thailand) 2019 Men's Indoor Hockey Asia Cup (Thailand) 2019 Women's Indoor Hockey Asia Cup	Continental	Men: Iran; Women: Kazakhstan
15–23	Fencing	(Hungary) 2019 World Fencing Championships	International	Russia
16–20	Badminton	(Canada) 2019 Pan Am Junior Badminton Championships	Continental	Canada
16–21	Canoe slalom	(Poland) 2019 World Junior and U23 Canoe Slalom Championships	International	France
16–24	Sailing	(Japan) 2019 Men's Laser Radial World Championship (Japan) 2019 Women's Laser Radial World Championship	International	Men: (Belgium) Simon de Gendt; Women: (Denmark) Anne-Marie Rindom
16–25	Lacrosse	(Israel) 2019 Women's European Lacrosse Championship	Continental	England
16–28	Association football	(Scotland) 2019 UEFA Women's Under-19 Championship	Continental	France
16–28	Handball	(Spain) 2019 Men's Junior World Handball Championship	International	France
18–21	Golf	(Northern Ireland) 2019 Open Championship	International	(Republic of Ireland) Shane Lowry
18–21	Athletics	(Sweden) 2019 European Athletics U20 Championships	Continental	Great Britain
18–27	Volleyball	(Bahrain) 2019 FIVB Volleyball Men's U21 World Championship	International	Iran
19–21	Athletics	(Costa Rica) 2019 Pan American U20 Athletics Championships	Continental	United States
19–21	Karate	(Uzbekistan) 2019 Asian Karate Championships	Continental	Japan
20–21	Athletics	(United Kingdom) Müller Anniversary Games (Diamond League #10)	International	Jamaica
20–21	Speedway	(Russia) 2019 Speedway of Nations (Final)	International	Russia
20–21	Triathlon	(Canada) 2019 ITU World Triathlon Series #7	International	Men: (United Kingdom) Jonny Brownlee; Women: (Australia) Emma Jackson
20–28	Basketball	(Thailand) 2019 FIBA Under-19 Women's Basketball World Cup	International	United States
20–28	Badminton	(China) 2019 Badminton Asia Junior Championships	Continental	China
20–28	Darts	(England) 2019 World Matchplay	International	(England) Rob Cross
20–29	Handball	(Lebanon) 2019 Asian Women's Junior Handball Championship	Continental	South Korea
20–10 August	Rugby union	(Argentina) / (Australia) / (New Zealand) / (South Africa) 2019 Rugby Championship	International	South Africa
21–27	Multi-sport event	(Azerbaijan) 2019 European Youth Summer Olympic Festival	Continental	Russia
21–28	Volleyball	(Tunisia) 2019 Men's African Volleyball Championship	Continental	Tunisia
22–26	Cue sports	(United States) 2019 WPA World Ten-ball Championship	International	(Chinese Taipei) Ko Ping-chung
22–28	Muay Thai	(Thailand) 2019 IFMA World Muaythai Championships	International	Elite A: Russia; Competitive Class U23: Thailand; Overall: Thailand
23–27	BMX racing	(Belgium) 2019 UCI BMX World Championships	International	Men: (Netherlands) Twan van Gendt; Women: (United States) Alise Willoughby
24–28	Rowing	(United States) 2019 World Rowing Under-23 Championships	International	Great Britain
25–28	Golf	(France) 2019 Evian Championship	International	(South Korea) Ko Jin-young
25–28	Golf	(United States) 2019 WGC-FedEx St. Jude Invitational	International	(United States) Brooks Koepka
25–28	Golf	(England) Senior Open Championship	International	(Germany) Bernhard Langer
25–28	Mountain biking	(Czech Republic) 2019 European Mountain Bike Championships (XC & XCE)	Continental	Switzerland
26–28	Snooker	(Latvia) 2019 Riga Masters	International	(China) Yan Bingtao
26–4 August	Baseball	(Taiwan) 2019 U-12 Baseball World Cup	International	Chinese Taipei
26–11 August	Multi-sport	(Peru) 2019 Pan American Games	Continental	United States
27	Basketball	(United States) 2019 WNBA All-Star Game	Domestic	Team Wilson; MVP: (Florida) Erica Wheeler ( Indiana Fever)
27	Horse racing	(United Kingdom) 2019 King George VI and Queen Elizabeth Stakes	International	Horse: (United Kingdom) Enable; Jockey: (Italy) Frankie Dettori; Trainer: (United Kingdom) John Gosden
27–4 August	Basketball	(Greece) 2019 FIBA U18 European Championship	Continental	Spain
27–10 August	Rugby union	(Fiji) / (Japan) / (Samoa) / (United States) 2019 World Rugby Pacific Nations Cup	Regional	Japan
28	Formula One	(Germany) 2019 German Grand Prix	International	(Netherlands) Max Verstappen ( (United Kingdom) Red Bull Racing)
28–3 August	Basketball	(Rwanda) 2019 FIBA Under-16 Women's African Championship	Continental	Mali
30–4 August	Squash	(Malaysia) 2019 Men's World Junior Squash Championships (Malaysia) 2019 Women's World Junior Squash Championships	International	Men: (Egypt) Mostafa Asal; Women: (Egypt) Hania El Hammamy

=== August ===
Date	Sport	Venue/Event	Status	Winner/s
1–2	Mountain bike racing	(Italy) 2019 UCI Mountain Bike World Championships (4X only)	International	Men: (France) Romain Mayet; Women: (Czech Republic) Romana Labounková
1–4	Golf	(England) 2019 Women's British Open	International	(Japan) Hinako Shibuno
1–4	Handball	(China) 2019 IHF Women's Super Globe	International	(Angola) 1º de Agosto
1–4	Rallying	2019 Rally Finland (WRC #9)	International	(Estonia) Ott Tänak & Martin Järveoja ( (Finland) Toyota Gazoo Racing WRT)
1–10	Korfball	(South Africa) 2019 IKF World Korfball Championship	International	Netherlands
1–11	Handball	(Slovenia) 2019 European Women's U-17 Handball Championship	Continental	Hungary
1–16 September	Cricket	(England) 2019 Ashes series	Bilateral	Series drawn 2–2 (Australia retain the Ashes)
2–9	Sailing	(Japan) 2019 470 World Championships	International	Men: Australia (Mathew Belcher & Will Ryan); Women: Great Britain (Hannah Mills & Eilidh McIntyre)
3–5	Table tennis	(Nigeria) 2019 ITTF Africa Cup	Continental	Men: (Egypt) Omar Assar; Women: (Egypt) Dina Meshref
3–10	Sport shooting	(Sweden) 2019 IPSC Rifle World Shoot	International	(Finland) Jarkko Laukia
3–11	Basketball	(Czech Republic) 2019 FIBA U20 Women's European Championship	Continental	Italy
4	Formula One	(Hungary) 2019 Hungarian Grand Prix	International	(United Kingdom) Lewis Hamilton ( (Germany) Mercedes)
4	Motorcycle racing	2019 Czech Republic motorcycle Grand Prix	International	MotoGP: (Spain) Marc Márquez ( (Belgium) Repsol Honda); Moto2: (Spain) Álex Márquez ( (Belgium) Marc VDS Racing Team); Moto3: (Spain) Arón Canet ( (Italy) Sterilgarda Max Racing Team)
5–11	Beach volleyball	(Russia) 2019 European Beach Volleyball Championship	Continental	Men: Norway (Anders Mol & Christian Sørum); Women: Latvia (Tina Graudina & Anastasija Kravčenoka)
5–11	Diving	(Ukraine) 2019 European Diving Championships	Continental	Russia
5–11	Tennis	(Canada) 2019 Canadian Open	International	Men: (Spain) Rafael Nadal; Women: (Canada) Bianca Andreescu
6–11	Modern pentathlon	(United Kingdom) 2019 European Modern Pentathlon Championships	Continental	Great Britain
6–18	Handball	(North Macedonia) 2019 Men's Youth World Handball Championship	International	Egypt
7–11	Road bicycle racing	(Netherlands) 2019 European Road Championships	Continental	Netherlands
7–11	Rowing	(Japan) 2019 World Rowing Junior Championships	International	Germany
8–18	Multi-sport	(China) 2019 World Police and Fire Games	International	For results, click here.
9–11	Athletics	(Poland) 2019 European Team Championships (Super League)	Continental	Poland
9–17	Basketball	(Italy) 2019 FIBA U16 European Championship	Continental	Spain
10–18	Basketball	(Senegal) 2019 Women's Afrobasket	Continental	Nigeria
11	Motorcycle racing	(Austria) 2019 Austrian motorcycle Grand Prix	International	MotoGP: (Italy) Andrea Dovizioso ( (Italy) Ducati Corse); Moto2: (South Africa) Brad Binder ( (Finland) Ajo Motorsport); Moto3: (Italy) Romano Fenati ( (Italy) VNE Snipers)
11–17	Fistball	(Switzerland) 2019 Men's Fistball World Championships	International	Germany
11–21	Climbing	(Japan) 2019 IFSC Climbing World Championships	International	Men: (Japan) Tomoa Narasaki; Women: (Slovenia) Janja Garnbret
12–18	Tennis	(United States) 2019 Cincinnati Masters	International	Men: (Russia) Daniil Medvedev; Women: (United States) Madison Keys
13–17	Orienteering	(Norway) 2019 World Orienteering Championships	International	Sweden
14	Association football	(Turkey) 2019 UEFA Super Cup	Continental	(England) Liverpool
14–18	Track cycling	(Germany) 2019 UCI Junior Track Cycling World Championships	International	Germany
16–25	Baseball	(United States) 2019 Little League World Series	International	(Louisiana) Eastbank Little League (River Ridge)
16–25	Field hockey	(Belgium) 2019 Men's EuroHockey Championship (Belgium) 2019 Women's EuroHockey Championship	Continental	Men: Belgium; Women: Netherlands
18	Athletics	(United Kingdom) Müller Grand Prix Birmingham (Diamond League #11)	International	Jamaica
18–25	Volleyball	(South Korea) 2019 Asian Women's Volleyball Championship	Continental	Japan
19–25	Archery	(Spain) 2019 World Archery Youth Championships	International	South Korea
19–25	Badminton	(Switzerland) 2019 BWF World Championships	International	Men: (Japan) Kento Momota; Women: (India) P. V. Sindhu
19–25	Equestrian	(Netherlands) 2019 FEI European Championships	Continental	Germany
19–31	Multi-sport	(Morocco) 2019 African Games	Continental	Egypt
20–25	Aquatics	(Hungary) 2019 FINA World Junior Swimming Championships	International	United States
21–25	Canoe sprint	(Hungary) 2019 ICF Canoe Sprint World Championships	International	Canoe sprint: Belarus; Paracanoe: Great Britain
21–30	Handball	(India) 2019 Asian Women's Youth Handball Championship	Continental	South Korea
21–30	Volleyball	(Tunisia) 2019 FIVB Volleyball Boys' U19 World Championship	International	Italy
22–25	Rallying	(Germany) 2019 Rallye Deutschland (WRC #10)	International	(Estonia) Ott Tänak & Martin Järveoja ( (Finland) Toyota Gazoo Racing WRT)
22–30	Basketball	(North Macedonia) 2019 FIBA U16 Women's European Championship	Continental	Russia
23–1 September	Multi-sports	(Peru) 2019 Parapan American Games	Continental	Brazil
23–8 September	Volleyball	(Hungary) / (Poland) / (Slovakia) / (Turkey) 2019 Women's European Volleyball Championship	Continental	Serbia
24	Athletics	(France) Meeting de Paris (Diamond League #12)	International	United States
24–31	Amateur boxing	(Spain) 2019 Women's European Amateur Boxing Championships	Continental	Russia
24–15 September	Road bicycle racing	(Spain) 2019 Vuelta a España (Grand Tour #3)	International	(Slovenia) Primož Roglič ( (Netherlands) Team Jumbo–Visma)
25	Motorcycle racing	(United Kingdom) 2019 British motorcycle Grand Prix	International	MotoGP: (Spain) Álex Rins ( (Japan) Suzuki MotoGP); Moto2: (Spain) Augusto Fernández ( (United Kingdom) Pons Racing); Moto3: (Spain) Marcos Ramírez ( (Luxembourg) Leopard Racing)
25	Triathlon	(Czech Republic) 2019 ITU Triathlon World Cup #11	International	Men: (United Kingdom) Samuel Dickinson; Women: (Czech Republic) Vendula Frintová
25–1 September	Judo	(Japan) 2019 World Judo Championships	International	Japan
25–1 September	Rowing	(Austria) 2019 World Rowing Championships	International	New Zealand
26–9 September	Tennis	(United States) 2019 US Open (Grand Slam #4)	International	Men: (Spain) Rafael Nadal; Women: (Canada) Bianca Andreescu
27–31	Handball	(Saudi Arabia) 2019 IHF Super Globe	International	(Spain) FC Barcelona
28–1 September	Mountain bike racing	(Canada) 2019 UCI Mountain Bike World Championships (XCO, XCR, & DHI)	International	Switzerland
28–1 September	Volleyball	(Peru) 2019 Women's South American Volleyball Championship	Continental	Brazil
29	Athletics	(Switzerland) Weltklasse Zürich (Diamond League #13)	International	United States
29–1 September	Triathlon	(Switzerland) 2019 ITU World Triathlon Series Grand Final	International	Men: (Norway) Kristian Blummenfelt; Women: (United States) Katie Zaferes
30–1 September	3x3 basketball	(Hungary) 2019 FIBA 3x3 Europe Cup	Continental	Men: Serbia; Women: France
30–8 September	Baseball	(South Korea) 2019 U-18 Baseball World Cup	International	Chinese Taipei
30–12 September	Association football	(Cook Islands) 2019 OFC U-19 Women's Championship	Continental	New Zealand
31–15 September	Basketball	(China) 2019 FIBA Basketball World Cup	International	Spain
31–14 December	American football	(United States) 2019 NCAA Division I FBS football season	Domestic	(Louisiana) LSU Tigers

=== September ===
Date	Sport	Venue/Event	Status	Winner/s
1	Endurance racing	(United Kingdom) 6 Hours of Silverstone (WEC #1)	International	LMP1: (Japan) Toyota Motorsport GmbH; LMP2: (Switzerland) Cool Racing; LMGTE Pro: (Germany) Porsche GT Team; LMGTE Am: (Italy) AF Corse
1	Formula One	(Belgium) 2019 Belgian Grand Prix	International	(Monaco) Charles Leclerc ( (Italy) Ferrari)
1–8	Modern pentathlon	(Hungary) 2019 World Modern Pentathlon Championships	International	Men: (France) Valentin Belaud; Women: (Belarus) Volha Silkina
2–7	Archery	(Canada) 2019 World 3D Archery Championships	International	France
2–7	Snooker	(Thailand) 2019 Six-red World Championship	International	(Scotland) Stephen Maguire
3–8	Table tennis	(France) 2019 European Table Tennis Championships	Continental	Men: Germany; Women: Romania
3–8	Table tennis	(Paraguay) 2019 Pan American Table Tennis Championships	Continental	Men: (Brazil) Vitor Ishiy; Women: (United States) Lily Zhang
3–17	Shooting	(Italy) 2019 European Shotgun Championship	Continental	Italy
4–8	Beach volleyball	(Italy) 2019 FIVB Beach Volleyball World Tour Finals	International	Men: Russia (Oleg Stoyanovskiy & Viacheslav Krasilnikov); Women: Germany (Margareta Kozuch & Laura Ludwig)
5–8	Field hockey	(Australia) 2019 Oceania Cup	Continental	Men: Australia; Women: New Zealand
5–14	Handball	(Niger) 2019 African Women's Junior Handball Championship	Continental	Tunisia
5–14	Volleyball	(Egypt) 2019 FIVB Volleyball Girls' U18 World Championship	International	United States
5–29 December	American football	(United States) 2019 NFL season	Domestic	(Maryland) Baltimore Ravens
6	Athletics	(Belgium) Memorial Van Damme (Diamond League #14)	International	United States
6–7	Archery	(Russia) 2019 Archery World Cup Final	International	United States
6–8	3x3 basketball	(Georgia (country)) 2019 FIBA 3x3 Under-18 Europe Cup	Continental	Men: Lithuania; Women: Spain
7	Triathlon	(Spain) 2019 ITU Triathlon World Cup #12	International	Men: (France) Vincent Luis; Women: (Germany) Laura Lindemann
7–8	Golf	(England) 2019 Walker Cup	International	United States
7–8	Rowing	(Greece) 2019 European Rowing U23 Championships	Continental	Romania
7–8	Triathlon	(France) 2019 Ironman 70.3 World Championship	International	Men: (Norway) Gustav Iden; Women: (Switzerland) Daniela Ryf
7–15	Surfing	(Japan) 2019 ISA World Surfing Games	International	Men: Italo Ferreira; Women: (Peru) Sofía Mulánovich; Team: Brazil
7–15	Baseball	(Germany) 2019 European Baseball Championship	Continental	Netherlands
8	Formula One	(Italy) 2019 Italian Grand Prix	International	(Monaco) Charles Leclerc ( (Italy) Ferrari)
8–14	Futsal	(Latvia) 2019 UEFA Under-19 Futsal Championship	Continental	Spain
9–15	Paralympic swimming	(United Kingdom) 2019 World Para Swimming Championships	International	Italy
9–21	Amateur boxing	(Russia) 2019 AIBA World Boxing Championships	International	Uzbekistan
9–4 October	Chess	(Russia) Chess World Cup 2019	International	(Azerbaijan) Teimour Radjabov
10–14	Volleyball	(Chile) 2019 Men's South American Volleyball Championship	Continental	Brazil
11–10 October	Basketball	(United States) 2019 WNBA Playoffs	Domestic	(Washington, D.C.) Washington Mystics
12–15	Rallying	2019 Rally Turkey (WRC #11)	International	(France) Sébastien Ogier & Julien Ingrassia ( (France) Citroën World Rally Team)
12–29	Volleyball	(Belgium) / (France) / (Slovenia) / (Netherlands) 2019 Men's European Volleyball Championship	Continental	Serbia
13–15	Golf	(Scotland) 2019 Solheim Cup	International	Europe
13–15	Multi-sport	(Hungary) 2019 World Urban Games	International	United States
13–21	Volleyball	(Iran) 2019 Asian Men's Volleyball Championship	Continental	Iran
14–22	Wrestling	(Kazakhstan) 2019 World Wrestling Championships	International	Men's Freestyle: Russia; Men's Greco-Roman: Russia; Women's Freestyle: Japan
14–29	Volleyball	(Japan) 2019 FIVB Volleyball Women's World Cup	International	China
15	Motorcycle racing	2019 San Marino and Rimini's Coast motorcycle Grand Prix	International	MotoGP: (Spain) Marc Márquez ( (Belgium) Repsol Honda); Moto2: (Spain) Augusto Fernández ( (United Kingdom) Pons Racing); Moto3: (Japan) Tatsuki Suzuki ( (Italy) SIC58 Squadra Corse)
15–22	Table tennis	(Indonesia) 2019 Asian Table Tennis Championships	Continental	Men: (China) Xu Xin; Women: (China) Sun Yingsha
15–28	Association football	(Thailand) 2019 AFC U-16 Women's Championship	Continental	Japan
15–3 October	Draughts	(Ivory Coast) 2019 World Draughts Championship	International	(Russia) Alexander Georgiev
16–22	Rhythmic gymnastics	(Azerbaijan) 2019 Rhythmic Gymnastics World Championships	International	Russia
16–24	Handball	(Niger) 2019 African Women's Youth Handball Championship	Continental	Egypt
18–27	Weightlifting	(Thailand) 2019 World Weightlifting Championships	International	China
19–22	Golf	(England) 2019 BMW PGA Championship	International	(England) Danny Willett
20–2 November	Rugby union	(Japan) 2019 Rugby World Cup	International	South Africa
21	Triathlon	(China) 2019 ITU Triathlon World Cup #13	International	Men: (Portugal) João Pedro Silva; Women: (Switzerland) Julie Derron
21–22	Mountain bike racing	(Switzerland) 2019 UCI Mountain Bike Marathon World Championships	International	Men: (Colombia) Héctor Leonardo Páez; Women: (France) Pauline Ferrand-Prévot
21–5 October	Association football	(Fiji) 2019 OFC U-23 Championship	Continental	New Zealand
22	Formula One	2019 Singapore Grand Prix	International	(Germany) Sebastian Vettel ( (Italy) Ferrari)
22	Motorcycle racing	2019 Aragon motorcycle Grand Prix	International	MotoGP: (Spain) Marc Márquez ( (Belgium) Repsol Honda); Moto2: (South Africa) Brad Binder ( (Finland) Ajo Motorsport); Moto3: (Spain) Arón Canet ( (Italy) Sterilgarda Max Racing Team)
22–28	Windsurfing	(Italy) 2019 RS:X World Championships	International	Men: (Netherlands) Kiran Badloe; Women: (China) Lu Yunxiu
22–29	Basketball	(Puerto Rico) 2019 FIBA Women's AmeriCup	Continental	United States
22–29	Road bicycle racing	(United Kingdom) 2019 UCI Road World Championships	International	United States
24–29	Basketball	(India) 2019 FIBA Women's Asia Cup	Continental	Japan
24–29	Canoe slalom	(Spain) 2019 ICF Canoe Slalom World Championships	International	Czech Republic
27–29	Netball	(Northern Ireland) 2019 Netball Europe Open Championships	Continental	England
27–6 October	Athletics	(Qatar) 2019 World Athletics Championships	International	United States
28	Australian rules football	(Australia) 2019 AFL Grand Final	Domestic	(Victoria (state)) Richmond Tigers
29	Formula One	(Russia) 2019 Russian Grand Prix	International	(United Kingdom) Lewis Hamilton ( (Germany) Mercedes)
29	Marathon	(Germany) 2019 Berlin Marathon (WMM #4)	International	Men: (Ethiopia) Kenenisa Bekele; Women: (Ethiopia) Ashete Bekere
30–13 October	Badminton	(Russia) 2019 BWF World Junior Championships	International	Men: (Thailand) Kunlavut Vitidsarn; Women: (Japan) Riko Gunji

=== October ===
Date	Sport	Venue/Event	Status	Winner/s
1–15	Volleyball	(Japan) 2019 FIVB Volleyball Men's World Cup	International	Brazil
3–6	Rallying	(United Kingdom) 2019 Wales Rally GB (WRC #12)	International	(Estonia) Ott Tänak & Martin Järveoja ( (Japan) Toyota Gazoo Racing WRT)
3–13	Amateur boxing	(Russia) 2019 AIBA Women's World Boxing Championships	International	Russia
4–13	Artistic gymnastics	(Germany) 2019 World Artistic Gymnastics Championships	International	United States
5–6	Rugby sevens	(United States) 2019 USA Women's Sevens (WRWSS #1)	International	United States
6	Endurance racing	(Japan) 2019 6 Hours of Fuji (WEC #2)	International	LMP1: (Japan) Toyota Gazoo Racing; LMP2: (Netherlands) Racing Team Nederland; LMGTE Pro: (United Kingdom) Aston Martin Racing; LMGTE Am: (United Kingdom) TF Sport
6	Horse racing	(France) 2019 Prix de l'Arc de Triomphe	International	Horse: (United Kingdom) Waldgeist; Jockey: (France) Pierre-Charles Boudot; Trainer: (France) André Fabre
6	Motorcycle racing	2019 Thailand motorcycle Grand Prix	International	MotoGP: (Spain) Marc Márquez ( (Japan) Repsol Honda Team); Moto2: (Italy) Luca Marini ( (Italy) Sky Racing Team VR46); Moto3: (Spain) Albert Arenas ( (Spain) Gaviota Ángel Nieto Team)
6–12	Darts	(Republic of Ireland) 2019 World Grand Prix	International	(Netherlands) Michael van Gerwen
6–13	Tennis	(China) 2019 Shanghai Masters	International	(Russia) Daniil Medvedev
10–21	Chess	(Isle of Man) FIDE Grand Swiss Tournament 2019	International	(China) Wang Hao
11–28	Association football	(Ecuador) 2019 Copa Libertadores Femenina	Continental	(Brazil) Corinthians
12	Road bicycle racing	(Italy) 2019 Il Lombardia (Monument #5)	International	(Netherlands) Bauke Mollema ( (United States) Trek–Segafredo)
12	Triathlon	(United States) 2019 Ironman World Championship	International	Men: (Germany) Jan Frodeno; Women: (Germany) Anne Haug
12–16	Multi-sport	(Qatar) 2019 World Beach Games	International	Spain
12–19	Curling	(Scotland) 2019 World Mixed Curling Championship	International	Canada (Skip: Colin Kurz)
13	Formula One	(Japan) 2019 Japanese Grand Prix	International	(Finland) Valtteri Bottas ( (Germany) Mercedes)
13	Marathon	(United States) 2019 Chicago Marathon (WMM #5)	International	Men: (Kenya) Lawrence Cherono; Women: (Kenya) Brigid Kosgei
14–20	Baseball	(Taiwan) 2019 Asian Baseball Championship	Continental	Chinese Taipei
16–20	Track cycling	(Netherlands) 2019 UEC European Track Championships	Continental	Netherlands
17–21	Track cycling	(South Korea) 2020 Asian Track Cycling Championships	Continental	Japan
18–19	Rugby league nines	(Australia) 2019 Rugby League World Cup 9s	International	Men: Australia; Women: New Zealand
18–20	Table tennis	(China) 2019 ITTF Women's World Cup	International	(China) Liu Shiwen
18–27	Multi-sport	(China) 2019 Military World Games	International	China
18–27	Olympic weightlifting	(Romania) 2019 European Junior & U23 Weightlifting Championships	Continental	Armenia
19	Triathlon	(South Korea) 2019 ITU Triathlon World Cup #14	International	Men: (United States) Matthew McElroy; Women: (France) Sandra Dodet
20	Motorcycle racing	(Japan) 2019 Japanese motorcycle Grand Prix	International	MotoGP: (Spain) Marc Márquez ( (Japan) Repsol Honda); Moto2: (Italy) Luca Marini ( (Italy) Sky Racing Team VR46); Moto3: (Italy) Lorenzo Dalla Porta ( (Luxembourg) Leopard Racing)
20–23	Wushu	(China) 2019 World Wushu Championships	International	China
22–27	Tennis	(China) 2019 WTA Elite Trophy	International	(Belarus) Aryna Sabalenka
22–30	Baseball	(United States) 2019 World Series	Domestic	(Washington, D.C.) Washington Nationals
23–27	Rowing	(South Korea) 2019 Asian Rowing Championships	Continental	China
24–27	Rallying	(Spain) 2019 Rally Catalunya (WRC #13)	International	(Belgium) Thierry Neuville & Nicolas Gilsoul ( (South Korea) Hyundai Shell Mobis WRT)
24–27	Darts	(Germany) 2019 European Championship	International	(England) Rob Cross
24–1 November	Squash	(Egypt) 2019–20 PSA Women's World Squash Championship	International	(Egypt) Nour El Sherbini
24–2 November	Chess	(Georgia (country)) 2019 European Team Chess Championship	Continental	Russia
26	Ice hockey	(Canada) 2019 Heritage Classic	Domestic	(Manitoba) Winnipeg Jets
26	Triathlon	(Japan) 2019 ITU Triathlon World Cup #15	International	Men: (United States) Matthew McElroy; Women: (Japan) Ai Ueda
26–17 November	Association football	(Brazil) 2019 FIFA U-17 World Cup	International	Brazil
27	Formula One	(Mexico) 2019 Mexican Grand Prix	International	(United Kingdom) Lewis Hamilton ( (Germany) Mercedes)
27	Motorcycle racing	(Australia) 2019 Australian motorcycle Grand Prix	International	MotoGP: (Spain) Marc Márquez ( (Japan) Repsol Honda); Moto2: (South Africa) Brad Binder ( (Finland) Red Bull KTM Ajo); Moto3: (Italy) Lorenzo Dalla Porta ( (Luxembourg) Leopard Racing)
27–3 November	Tennis	(China) 2019 WTA Finals	International	Singles: (Australia) Ashleigh Barty; Doubles: (Hungary) Tímea Babos / (France) Kristina Mladenovic
27–9 November	Association football	(Thailand) 2019 AFC U-19 Women's Championship	Continental	Japan
28–3 November	Tennis	(France) 2019 Paris Masters	International	(Serbia) Novak Djokovic
28–3 November	Wrestling	(Hungary) 2019 World U23 Wrestling Championship	International	Men's freestyle: Russia; Men's Greco-Roman: Iran; Women's freestyle: Japan
30–3 November	Acrobatic gymnastics	(Israel) 2019 Acrobatic Gymnastics European Championships	Continental	Russia
31–3 November	Golf	(China) 2019 WGC-HSBC Champions	International	(Northern Ireland) Rory McIlroy

=== November ===
Date	Sport	Venue/Event	Status	Winner/s
1–2	Horse racing	(United States) 2019 Breeders' Cup	International	Breeders' Cup Classic: Horse: (United States) Vino Rosso; Jockey: (Puerto Rico) Irad Ortiz Jr. Trainer: (United States) Todd Pletcher
1–3	Motorsport	(Italy) 2019 FIA Motorsport Games	International	Russia
1–3	Judo	(Russia) 2019 European U23 Judo Championships	Continental	Russia
2–3	Triathlon	(Peru) 2019 ITU Triathlon World Cup #16	International	Men: (Brazil) Manoel Messias; Women: (Japan) Ai Ueda
2–9	Curling	(China) 2019 Pacific-Asia Curling Championships	International	Men: South Korea (Skip: Kim Chang-min); Women: China (Skip: Han Yu)
2–17	Baseball	(Taiwan) / (South Korea) / (Mexico) / (Japan) 2019 WBSC Premier12	International	Japan
3	Formula One	2019 United States Grand Prix	International	(Finland) Valtteri Bottas ( (Germany) Mercedes)
3	Marathon	(United States) 2019 New York City Marathon (WMM #6)	International	Men: (Kenya) Geoffrey Kamworor; Women: (Kenya) Joyciline Jepkosgei
3	Motorcycle racing	(Malaysia) 2019 Malaysian motorcycle Grand Prix	International	MotoGP: (Spain) Maverick Viñales ( (Japan) Monster Energy Yamaha MotoGP); Moto2: (South Africa) Brad Binder ( (Finland) Red Bull KTM Ajo); Moto3: (Italy) Lorenzo Dalla Porta ( (Luxembourg) Leopard Racing)
3–8	Shooting	(Australia) 2019 Oceania Shooting Championships	Continental	Australia
4–10	Snooker	(England) 2019 Champion of Champions	International	(Australia) Neil Robertson
5	Horse racing	(Australia) 2019 Melbourne Cup	International	Horse: (Australia) Vow And Declare; Jockey: (Australia) Craig Williams; Trainer: (Australia) Danny O’Brien
5–9	Beach soccer	(United Arab Emirates) 2019 Beach Soccer Intercontinental Cup	International	Iran
5–9	Tennis	(Italy) 2019 Next Generation ATP Finals	International	(Italy) Jannik Sinner
5–13	Shooting	(Qatar) 2019 Asian Shooting Championships	Continental	China
6–10	Table tennis	(Japan) 2019 ITTF Team World Cup	International	Men: China; Women: China
7–9	Rugby sevens	(Fiji) 2019 Oceania Sevens Championship (Fiji) 2019 Oceania Women's Sevens Championship	Continental	Men: Australia; Women: Australia
7–15	Athletics	(United Arab Emirates) 2019 World Para Athletics Championships	International	China
8–10	Sambo	(South Korea) 2019 World Sambo Championships	International	Russia
8–15	Squash	(Qatar) 2019–20 PSA Men's World Squash Championship	International	(Egypt) Tarek Momen
8–22	Association football	(Egypt) 2019 Africa U-23 Cup of Nations	Continental	Egypt
9	Association football	(Paraguay) 2019 Copa Sudamericana Final	Continental	(Ecuador) Independiente del Valle
9–10	Tennis	(Australia) 2019 Fed Cup World Group Final	Intercontinental	France
9–10	Triathlon	(Dominican Republic) 2019 ITU Triathlon World Cup #17	International	Men: (United States) Matthew McElroy; Women: (New Zealand) Andrea Hewitt
9–17	Darts	(England) 2019 Grand Slam of Darts	International	(Wales) Gerwyn Price
9–24	Association football	(Saudi Arabia) / (Japan) 2019 AFC Champions League Final	Continental	(Saudi Arabia) Al-Hilal
10	Endurance racing	(China) 4 Hours of Shanghai (WEC #3)	International	LMP1: (Switzerland) Rebellion Racing; LMP2: (United Kingdom) Jota Sport; LMGTE Pro: (Germany) Porsche GT Team; LMGTE Am: (United Kingdom) TF Sport
10–17	Tennis	(United Kingdom) 2019 ATP Finals	International	Singles: (Greece) Stefanos Tsitsipas; Doubles: (France) Pierre-Hugues Herbert / Nicolas Mahut
14–17	Rallying	2019 Rally Australia (WRC #14)	International	Cancelled due to bushfires
16–17	Wrestling	(Japan) 2019 Wrestling World Cup - Women's freestyle	International	Japan
16–23	Curling	(Sweden) 2019 European Curling Championships	Continental	Men: Sweden (Skip: Niklas Edin); Women: Sweden (Skip: Anna Hasselborg)
17	Formula One	(Brazil) 2019 Brazilian Grand Prix	International	(Netherlands) Max Verstappen ( (Austria) Red Bull Racing)
17	Motorcycle racing	2019 Valencian Community motorcycle Grand Prix	International	MotoGP: (Spain) Marc Márquez ( (Japan) Repsol Honda Team); Moto2: (South Africa) Brad Binder ( (Finland) Red Bull KTM Ajo); Moto3: (Spain) Sergio García ( (Spain) Estrella Galicia 0,0)
17–25	Shooting	(Algeria) 2019 African Shooting Championships	Continental	Egypt
18–24	Tennis	(Spain) 2019 Davis Cup Finals	International	Spain
21–1 December	Beach soccer	(Paraguay) 2019 FIFA Beach Soccer World Cup	International	Portugal
22–23	Formula E	(Saudi Arabia) 2019 Diriyah ePrix (FE #1 & #2)	International	Race 1: (United Kingdom) Sam Bird ( (United Kingdom) Envision Virgin Racing); Race 2: (United Kingdom) Alexander Sims ( (United States) BMW i Andretti Motorsport)
22–24	Darts	(England) 2019 Players Championship Finals	International	(Netherlands) Michael van Gerwen
23	Association football	(Chile) 2019 Copa Libertadores Final	Continental	(Brazil) Flamengo
23–8 December	Association football	(Paraguay) 2019 South American U-15 Championship	Continental	Brazil
24	Canadian football	(Canada) 107th Grey Cup	Domestic	(Manitoba) Winnipeg Blue Bombers
24	Horse racing	2019 Japan Cup	International	Horse: (Japan) Suave Richard; Jockey: (Republic of Ireland) Oisin Murphy; Trainer: (Japan) Yasushi Shono
24–1 December	Table tennis	(Thailand) 2019 World Junior Table Tennis Championships	International	China
25–28	Nine-ball pool	(United States) 2019 Mosconi Cup	International	United States
26–30	Association football	(South Korea) 2019 AFC Women's Club Championship	Continental	(Japan) Nippon TV Beleza
26–8 December	Snooker	(England) 2019 UK Championship (Triple Crown #1)	International	(China) Ding Junhui
28–1 December	Trampolining	(Japan) 2019 Trampoline World Championships	International	Russia
29–1 December	Table tennis	(China) 2019 ITTF Men's World Cup	International	(China) Fan Zhendong
30–11 December	Multi-sport	(Philippines) 2019 Southeast Asian Games	Regional	Philippines
30–15 December	Handball	(Japan) 2019 World Women's Handball Championship	International	Netherlands

=== December ===
Date	Sport	Venue/Event	Status	Winner/s
1	Formula One	(United Arab Emirates) 2019 Abu Dhabi Grand Prix	International	(United Kingdom) Lewis Hamilton ( (Germany) Mercedes)
1–8	Sailing	(New Zealand) 2019 49er & 49er FX World Championships (New Zealand) 2019 Nacra 17 World Championship	International	49er: (New Zealand) Peter Burling / Blair Tuke; 49er FX: (Netherlands) Annemiek Bekkering / Annette Duetz; Nacra 17: (Italy) Vittorio Bissaro / Maelle Frascari
1–10	Multi-sport	(Nepal) 2019 South Asian Games	Regional	India
3–8	Volleyball	(Brazil) 2019 FIVB Volleyball Men's Club World Championship (China) 2019 FIVB Volleyball Women's Club World Championship	International	Men: (Italy) Lube Civitanova; Women: (Italy) Imoco Volley Conegliano
4–8	Swimming	(United Kingdom) 2019 European Short Course Swimming Championships	Continental	Russia
4–10	Ice hockey	(Bulgaria) 2020 IIHF Women's World Championship Division III	International	South Africa
5–7	Rugby sevens	(United Arab Emirates) 2019 Dubai Sevens (WRSS #1) (United Arab Emirates) 2019 Dubai Women's Sevens (WRWSS #2)	International	Men: South Africa; Women: New Zealand
5–8	Figure skating	(Italy) 2019–20 Grand Prix of Figure Skating Final	International	Russia
6–7	Taekwondo	(Russia) 2019 World Taekwondo Grand Prix Final	International	China
7	Professional boxing	(Saudi Arabia) Andy Ruiz Jr. vs. Anthony Joshua II	International	(United Kingdom) Anthony Joshua
7–14	Olympic weightlifting	(Israel) 2019 European Youth Weightlifting Championships	Continental	Russia
7–15	Floorball	(Switzerland) 2019 Women's World Floorball Championships	International	Sweden
8	Cross country running	(Portugal) 2019 European Cross Country Championships	Continental	Men: (Sweden) Robel Fsiha; Women: (Turkey) Yasemin Can
8	Horse racing	2019 Hong Kong Cup	International	Horse: (Japan) Win Bright; Jockey: (Japan) Masami Matsuoka; Trainer: (Japan) Yoshihiro Hatakeyama
9–15	Ice hockey	(Belarus) 2020 World Junior Ice Hockey Championships – Division I – Group A	International	Austria
10–18	Association football	(South Korea) 2019 EAFF E-1 Football Championship (South Korea) 2019 EAFF E-1 Football Championship (women)	Regional	Men: South Korea; Women: Japan
11–15	Badminton	(China) 2019 BWF World Tour Finals	International	Men: (Japan) Kento Momota; Women: (China) Chen Yufei
11–21	Association football	(Qatar) 2019 FIFA Club World Cup	International	(England) Liverpool
12–15	Golf	(Australia) 2019 Presidents Cup	International	United States
12–15	Table tennis	(China) 2019 ITTF World Tour Grand Finals	International	Men: (China) Fan Zhendong; Women: (China) Chen Meng
12–18	Ice hockey	(Ukraine) 2020 World Junior Ice Hockey Championships – Division I – Group B	International	Hungary
13–15	Rugby sevens	2019 South Africa Sevens (WRSS #2); 2019 South Africa Women's Sevens (WRWSS #3)	International	Men: New Zealand; Women: New Zealand
13–17	Nine-ball pool	(Qatar) 2019 WPA World Nine-ball Championship	International	(Russia) Fedor Gorst
13–21	Sailing	(Australia) 2019 Finn Gold Cup	International	(New Zealand) Josh Junior
13–1 January 2020	Darts	(England) 2020 PDC World Darts Championship	International	(Scotland) Peter Wright
14	Endurance racing	2019 8 Hours of Bahrain (WEC #4)	International	LMP1: (Japan) Toyota Gazoo Racing; LMP2: (United Kingdom) United Autosports; LMGTE Pro: (United Kingdom) Aston Martin Racing; LMGTE Am: (Germany) Team Project 1
15–21	Squash	(United States) 2019 Men's World Team Squash Championships	International	Egypt
18–20	Taekwondo	(China) 2019 World Taekwondo Grand Slam	International	South Korea
26–30	Chess	(Russia) 2019 World Rapid Chess Championship (Russia) 2019 World Blitz Chess Championship	International	Rapid (Open): (Norway) Magnus Carlsen; Rapid (Women): (India) Humpy Koneru; Blitz (Open): (Norway) Magnus Carlsen; Blitz (Women): (Russia) Kateryna Lagno
26–2 January 2020	Ice hockey	(Slovakia) 2020 IIHF World Women's U18 Championship	International	United States
26–5 January 2020	Ice hockey	(Czech Republic) 2020 World Junior Ice Hockey Championships	International	Canada
28–5 January 2020	Cross-country skiing	(Switzerland) / (Italy) 2019–20 Tour de Ski	International	Men: (Russia) Alexander Bolshunov; Women: (Norway) Therese Johaug
28–6 January 2020	Ski jumping	(Germany) / (Austria) 2019–20 Four Hills Tournament	International	(Poland) Dawid Kubacki
