= Huia Harding =

- Born: 12 July 1993 (age 33)

Rugby union career
- Position: Forward
Provincial / State sides
| Years | Team | Apps | (Points) |
| 2014 – present | Waikato | 24 | (25) |
National sevens team
| Years | Team | | Comps |
| 2018– | New Zealand | | |

Huia Harding (born 12 July 1993) is a New Zealand rugby sevens player.

Harding joined the Black Ferns Sevens in 2018, she was one of three newly contracted players that year. She featured at the 2018 Japan Women's Sevens.

Harding was named in the Black Ferns Sevens squad for the 2018–19 Sevens Series.

In 2019, Harding scored a brace of tries in their 48–0 win against Japan at the Dubai Sevens. She later appeared at the 2019 South Africa Sevens in Cape Town.

Harding is a qualified lawyer and has represented Waikato in sevens and fifteens.
