= 2019 New Zealand Women's Sevens =

Inaugural women's rugby sevens tournament

- Host nation: New Zealand
- Date: 26–27 January 2019

Tournament details
- Matches played: 8

The 2019 New Zealand Women's Sevens Fast Four or Women's Fast Four was the inaugural women's sevens tournament held on 26–27 January 2019 at FMG Stadium Waikato, Hamilton alongside the 2019 New Zealand Sevens.

In August 2018, New Zealand Rugby announced the Black Ferns Sevens would play France, England and China at the Women's Fast Four. Each team played four matches a week before round three of the Sydney Women's Sevens in Sydney. Although the Black Ferns Sevens had previously played exhibition matches in New Zealand, the 2019 HSBC New Zealand Sevens was the first time the team had competed in an international tournament on home turf.

== Format ==
Each team played four matches in Hamilton: three matches within a round-robin format followed by a final playoff match. The top two teams met in the gold medal match, with the bottom two playing for bronze.

The women's final matches were played directly before the men's Cup final to complete the two days of competition at the 2019 New Zealand Sevens.

== Teams ==
Four core teams from 2018–19 World Rugby Women's Sevens Series participated in the tournament:

- China
- England
- France
- New Zealand

== Round-robin ==
All times in New Zealand Time (UTC+12:00)

Cup finalists are highlighted in green

Team	Pld	W	D	L	PF	PA	PD	Pts
New Zealand	3	3	0	0	84	19	+65	9
France	3	2	0	1	60	43	+17	7
England	3	1	0	2	59	57	+2	5
China	3	0	0	3	21	105	-84	3

26 January 2019	France	31–7	China	Waikato Stadium, Hamilton
12:44

26 January 2019	New Zealand	19–14	England	Waikato Stadium, Hamilton
13:06

26 January 2019	England	33–14	China	Waikato Stadium, Hamilton
13:26

26 January 2019	New Zealand	24–5	France	Waikato Stadium, Hamilton
15:10

27 January 2019	New Zealand	41–0	China	Waikato Stadium, Hamilton
18:12

27 January 2019	France	24–12	England	Waikato Stadium, Hamilton
14:24

== Third place ==
27 January 2019	England	26–7	China	Waikato Stadium, Hamilton
19:10

== Cup final ==
27 January 2019	New Zealand	31–0	France	Waikato Stadium, Hamilton
20:10

== Tournament placings ==
Gold medal	New Zealand
Silver medal	France
Bronze medal	England
4	China

Source: World Rugby

== See also ==
- 2019 New Zealand Sevens
- 2018–19 World Rugby Women's Sevens Series
- World Rugby

New Zealand Women's Sevens
Preceded by N/A	2019 New Zealand Women's Sevens	Succeeded by 2020 New Zealand Women's Sevens
