= 2020 Sydney Women's Sevens =

2020 World Rugby Women's Sevens Series

- Women's Sevens Series VIII
- Host nation: Australia
- Date: 1–2 February 2020

Cup
- Champion: New Zealand
- Runner-up: Canada
- Third: Australia

Tournament details
- Matches played: 28

The 2020 Sydney Women's Sevens was the fifth tournament within the 2019–20 World Rugby Women's Sevens Series and the fourth edition of the Australian Women's Sevens. It was held over the first weekend of February 2020 at Bankwest Stadium in Sydney and was run alongside the men's tournament.

In the final, New Zealand claimed their fourth tournament victory in a row as they defeated Canada 33–7.

== Format ==
The teams were drawn into three pools of four teams each. Each team played every other team in their pool once. The top team from each pool and the best second-placed team advanced to the semifinals to playoff for berths in the cup final and third place match. The other teams from each group were paired off for the lower classification matches.

== Teams ==
There were twelve national women's teams in the tournament, the eleven core teams for the series plus Japan as the invited side.

- Australia
- Brazil
- Canada
- Japan
- England
- Fiji
- France
- Ireland
- New Zealand
- Russia
- Spain
- United States

== Pool stage ==
=== Pool A ===
| Team | Pld | W | D | L | PF | PA | PD | Pts | Qualification |
|---|---|---|---|---|---|---|---|---|---|
| New Zealand | 3 | 3 | 0 | 0 | 76 | 24 | +52 | 9 | Advance to semifinals |
| England | 3 | 2 | 0 | 1 | 71 | 31 | +40 | 7 | 5th-place playoff |
| Russia | 3 | 1 | 0 | 2 | 26 | 67 | -41 | 5 | 7th-place playoff |
| Japan | 3 | 0 | 0 | 3 | 17 | 68 | -51 | 3 | 9th-place playoff |

1 February 2020

| England | 33–0 | Russia |

Bankwest Stadium, Sydney

1 February 2020

| New Zealand | 28–0 | Japan |

Bankwest Stadium, Sydney

1 February 2020

| England | 26–5 | Japan |

Bankwest Stadium, Sydney

1 February 2020

| New Zealand | 22–12 | Russia |

Bankwest Stadium, Sydney

2 February 2020

| Russia | 14–12 | Japan |

Bankwest Stadium, Sydney

2 February 2020

| New Zealand | 26–12 | England |

Bankwest Stadium, Sydney

=== Pool B ===
| Team | Pld | W | D | L | PF | PA | PD | Pts | Qualification |
|---|---|---|---|---|---|---|---|---|---|
| Canada | 3 | 3 | 0 | 0 | 74 | 31 | +43 | 9 | Advance to semifinals |
| Fiji | 3 | 2 | 0 | 1 | 64 | 34 | +30 | 7 | 5th-place playoff |
| United States | 3 | 1 | 0 | 2 | 55 | 59 | -4 | 5 | 7th-place playoff |
| Brazil | 3 | 0 | 0 | 3 | 29 | 98 | -69 | 3 | 11th-place playoff |

1 February 2020

| United States | 14–19 | Fiji |

Bankwest Stadium, Sydney

1 February 2020

| Canada | 33–10 | Brazil |

Bankwest Stadium, Sydney

1 February 2020

| United States | 34–19 | Brazil |

Bankwest Stadium, Sydney

1 February 2020

| Canada | 20–14 | Fiji |

Bankwest Stadium, Sydney

2 February 2020

| Fiji | 31–0 | Brazil |

Bankwest Stadium, Sydney

2 February 2020

| Canada | 21–7 | United States |

Bankwest Stadium, Sydney

=== Pool C ===
| Team | Pld | W | D | L | PF | PA | PD | Pts | Qualification |
|---|---|---|---|---|---|---|---|---|---|
| Australia | 3 | 3 | 0 | 0 | 81 | 10 | +71 | 9 | Advance to semifinals |
| France | 3 | 2 | 0 | 1 | 92 | 35 | +57 | 7 | Advance to semifinals |
| Spain | 3 | 1 | 0 | 2 | 31 | 80 | -49 | 5 | 9th-place playoff |
| Ireland | 3 | 0 | 0 | 3 | 19 | 98 | -79 | 3 | 11th-place playoff |

1 February 2020

| Australia | 33–0 | Spain |

Bankwest Stadium, Sydney

1 February 2020

| France | 40–14 | Ireland |

Bankwest Stadium, Sydney

1 February 2020

| Australia | 34–0 | Ireland |

Bankwest Stadium, Sydney

1 February 2020

| France | 42–7 | Spain |

Bankwest Stadium, Sydney

2 February 2020

| Spain | 24–5 | Ireland |

Bankwest Stadium, Sydney

2 February 2020

| Australia | 14–10 | France |

Bankwest Stadium, Sydney

== Placement matches ==
=== Eleventh place ===
| 2 February | Brazil | 7–20 | Ireland | Bankwest Stadium, Sydney |
| 14:08 |

=== Ninth place ===
| 2 February | Spain | 17–33 | Japan | Bankwest Stadium, Sydney |
| 14:30 |

=== Seventh place ===
| 2 February | United States | 15–19 | Russia | Bankwest Stadium, Sydney |
| 14:52 |

=== Fifth place ===
| 2 February | England | 5–17 | Fiji | Bankwest Stadium, Sydney |
| 15:14 |

== Knockout stage ==
Semi-finals
2 February 2020 – 15:36 – Bankwest Stadium, Sydney
Canada | 34
Australia | 0
2 February 2020 – 15:58 – Bankwest Stadium, Sydney
New Zealand | 24
France | 7

Final
2 February 2020 – 20:36 – Bankwest Stadium, Sydney
Canada | 7
New Zealand | 33
Third place
2 February 2020 – 19:37 – Bankwest Stadium, Sydney
Australia | 12
France | 10

== Tournament placings ==
| Place | Team | Points |
|---|---|---|
| 1st place, gold medalist(s) | New Zealand | 20 |
| 2nd place, silver medalist(s) | Canada | 18 |
| 3rd place, bronze medalist(s) | Australia | 16 |
| 4 | France | 14 |
| 5 | Fiji | 12 |
| 6 | England | 10 |

| Place | Team | Points |
|---|---|---|
| 7 | Russia | 8 |
| 8 | United States | 6 |
| 9 | Japan | 4 |
| 10 | Spain | 3 |
| 11 | Ireland | 2 |
| 12 | Brazil | 1 |

Source: World Rugby

== See also ==
- World Rugby Women's Sevens Series
- 2019–20 World Rugby Women's Sevens Series
- 2020 Sydney Sevens

Women's Sevens Series VIII
| Preceded by 2020 New Zealand Women's Sevens | 2020 Sydney Women's Sevens | Succeeded by None (last event) |
Australian Women's Sevens
| Preceded by 2019 Sydney Women's Sevens | 2020 Sydney Women's Sevens | Succeeded by 2023 Sydney Women's Sevens |
