= 2020 New Zealand Women's Sevens =

Rugby Contest

- Women's Sevens Series VIII
- Host nation: New Zealand
- Date: 25-26 January 2020

Cup
- Champion: New Zealand
- Runner-up: Canada
- Third: France

Tournament details
- Matches played: 28
- Tries scored: 157 (average 5.61 per match)
- Most points: Michaela Blyde & Stacey Fluhler (45 pts each)
- Most tries: Michaela Blyde & Stacey Fluhler (9 tries each)

The 2020 New Zealand Women's Sevens was a tournament at the Waikato Stadium in Hamilton, New Zealand from 25-26 January 2020. It was the first edition of the New Zealand Women's Sevens for the World Rugby Women's Sevens Series and the fourth tournament of the 2019–20 World Rugby Women's Sevens Series.

== Format ==
The teams were drawn into three pools of four teams each. Each team played every other team in their pool once. The top team from each pool and the best second-placed team advanced to the semifinals to playoff for berths in the cup final and third place match. The other teams from each group were paired off for the lower classification matches.

== Teams ==
Twelve teams competed in the tournament with eleven being the core teams that compete throughout the entire season. The invited team for the tournament was China.

- Australia
- Brazil
- Canada
- China
- England
- Fiji
- France
- Ireland
- New Zealand
- Russia
- Spain
- United States

== Pool stage ==
=== Pool A ===
| Team | Pld | W | D | L | PF | PA | PD | Pts | Qualification |
|---|---|---|---|---|---|---|---|---|---|
| New Zealand | 3 | 3 | 0 | 0 | 118 | 35 | +83 | 9 | Advance to semifinals |
| England | 3 | 1 | 0 | 2 | 57 | 66 | -9 | 5 | 5th-place playoff |
| Fiji | 3 | 1 | 0 | 2 | 59 | 74 | -15 | 5 | 7th-place playoff |
| China | 3 | 1 | 0 | 2 | 24 | 83 | -59 | 5 | 9th-place playoff |

25 January 2020

| Fiji | 26–19 | England |

Waikato Stadium, Hamilton

25 January 2020

| New Zealand | 40–7 | China |

Waikato Stadium, Hamilton

25 January 2020

| Fiji | 12–17 | China |

Waikato Stadium, Hamilton

25 January 2020

| New Zealand | 40–7 | England |

Waikato Stadium, Hamilton

26 January 2020

| China | 0–31 | England |

Waikato Stadium, Hamilton

26 January 2020

| New Zealand | 38–21 | Fiji |

Waikato Stadium, Hamilton

=== Pool B ===
| Team | Pld | W | D | L | PF | PA | PD | Pts | Qualification |
|---|---|---|---|---|---|---|---|---|---|
| Australia | 3 | 3 | 0 | 0 | 83 | 40 | +43 | 9 | Advance to semifinals |
| United States | 3 | 2 | 0 | 1 | 67 | 38 | +29 | 7 | 5th-place playoff |
| Russia | 3 | 1 | 0 | 2 | 48 | 73 | -25 | 5 | 7th-place playoff |
| Brazil | 3 | 0 | 0 | 3 | 35 | 82 | -47 | 3 | 11th-place playoff |

25 January 2020

| United States | 19–12 | Russia |

Waikato Stadium, Hamilton

25 January 2020

| Australia | 24–14 | Brazil |

Waikato Stadium, Hamilton

25 January 2020

| United States | 34–7 | Brazil |

Waikato Stadium, Hamilton

25 January 2020

| Australia | 40–12 | Russia |

Waikato Stadium, Hamilton

26 January 2020

| Russia | 24–14 | Brazil |

Waikato Stadium, Hamilton

26 January 2020

| Australia | 19–14 | United States |

Waikato Stadium, Hamilton

=== Pool C ===
| Team | Pld | W | D | L | PF | PA | PD | Pts | Qualification |
|---|---|---|---|---|---|---|---|---|---|
| Canada | 3 | 3 | 0 | 0 | 80 | 31 | +49 | 9 | Advance to semifinals |
| France | 3 | 2 | 0 | 1 | 85 | 35 | +50 | 7 | Advance to semifinals |
| Spain | 3 | 1 | 0 | 2 | 26 | 73 | -47 | 5 | 9th-place playoff |
| Ireland | 3 | 0 | 0 | 3 | 21 | 73 | -52 | 3 | 11th-place playoff |

25 January 2020

| France | 31–7 | Spain |

Waikato Stadium, Hamilton

25 January 2020

| Canada | 24–7 | Ireland |

Waikato Stadium, Hamilton

25 January 2020

| France | 35–7 | Ireland |

Waikato Stadium, Hamilton

25 January 2020

| Canada | 35–5 | Spain |

Waikato Stadium, Hamilton

26 January 2020

| Spain | 14–7 | Ireland |

Waikato Stadium, Hamilton

26 January 2020

| France | 19–21 | Canada |

Waikato Stadium, Hamilton

== Placement matches ==
=== Eleventh place ===
| Brazil | 19–26 | Ireland |

=== Ninth place ===
| Spain | 0–31 | China |

=== Seventh place ===
| Fiji | 21–26 | Russia |

=== Fifth place ===
| United States | 45–5 | England |

== Knockout stage ==
=== Cup ===
Semi-finals
26 January 2020 – Waikato Stadium
Australia | 19
Canada | 28
26 January 2020 – Waikato Stadium
New Zealand | 19
France | 7

Final
26 January 2020 – Waikato Stadium
Canada | 7
New Zealand | 24
Third place
26 January 2020 – Waikato Stadium
Australia | 14
France | 19

Matches

Semi-finals

| Australia | 19–28 | Canada |

| New Zealand | 19–7 | France |

3rd place

| Australia | 14–19 | France |

Cup Final

| Canada | 7–24 | New Zealand |

== See also ==
- World Rugby Women's Sevens Series
- 2019–20 World Rugby Women's Sevens Series
- 2020 New Zealand Sevens

Women's Sevens Series VIII
| Preceded by 2019 South Africa Women's Sevens | 2020 New Zealand Women's Sevens | Succeeded by 2020 Sydney Women's Sevens |
New Zealand Women's Sevens
| Preceded by 2019 New Zealand Women's Sevens | 2020 New Zealand Women's Sevens | Succeeded by 2023 New Zealand Women's Sevens |
