= Yuki Ito =

Yuki Ito may refer to:

- Yuki Ito (actor) (伊藤 友樹, Itō Yūki; born 1985), Japanese actor
- Yuki Ito (cellist) (伊藤 悠貴, Itō Yūki; born 1989), Japanese classical cellist
- Yuki Ito (ski jumper) (伊藤 有希, Itō Yūki; born 1994), Japanese ski jumper
- Yuki Ito (motorcyclist) (伊藤 勇樹, Itō Yūki; born 1991), Japanese Grand Prix motorcycle racer
