= Anna Baranchuk =

Russian rugby sevens player

- Full name: Anna Alexandrovna Baranchuk
- Born: 18 December 1993 (age 32) Prokopyevsk, Russia
- Height: 1.69 m (5 ft 7 in)
- Weight: 65 kg (143 lb)

Rugby union career
International career
Years	Team	Apps	(Points)
2014	Russia		
National sevens team
Years	Team		Comps
2018–Present	Russia		64 (20 pts)

Anna Alexandrovna Baranchuk (Russian: Анна Александровна Баранчук; born 18 December 1993) is a Russian rugby sevens player. She competed in the women's tournament at the 2020 Summer Olympics.
