= María Casado =

María Casado is the name of:

- María Casado (journalist) (born 1978), Spanish journalist and presenter
- María Casado (rugby union) (born 1985), Spanish rugby sevens player
