= Australian Women's Sevens =

Annual rugby sevens tournament

- Recent tournament 2024 Australia Sevens
- Sport: Rugby sevens
- Inaugural season: 2017
- Number of teams: 12
- Holders: Ireland (2024)
- Most titles: New Zealand (3)

The Australian Women's Sevens, currently hosted in Perth, is an annual rugby sevens tournament and one of the stops on the World Rugby Women's Sevens Series. Australia joined the women's circuit in 2017 for the fifth edition of the series.

Originally hosted at the Sydney Football Stadium prior to its demolition and rebuilding, both the men's and women's events for the Sydney Sevens tournament were moved to the Sydney Showground Stadium in 2019, and then to Western Sydney Stadium for 2020. Since 2024 the tournament has been played in Perth at Perth Rectangular Stadium.

== Champions ==
Year	Venue	Cup final			Placings			Refs
		Winner	Score	Runner-up	Third	Fourth	Fifth	
2017	Sydney Football Stadium	Canada	21–17	United States	New Zealand	Australia	Fiji	
2018	Sydney Football Stadium	Australia	31–0	New Zealand	Canada	Russia	France	
2019	Sydney Showground	New Zealand	34–10	Australia	United States	Ireland	Canada	
2020	Western Sydney Stadium	New Zealand	35–0	Canada	Australia	France	Fiji	
World Series tournaments planned for Sydney were cancelled in 2021 and 2022, due to COVID-19.
2023	Sydney Football Stadium	New Zealand	33–7	France	United States	Ireland	Australia	
2024	Perth Rectangular Stadium	Ireland	19–14	Australia	Great Britain	United States	New Zealand	

== See also ==
- Australian Sevens (men's tournament)
