= 2019–20 World Rugby Women's Sevens Series =

8th edition of the global circuit for women's national rugby sevens teams

World Rugby Women's Sevens Series VIII
- Hosts: United States; United Arab Emirates; South Africa; New Zealand; Australia
- Date: 5 October 2019 – 2 February 2020

Final positions
- Champions: New Zealand
- Runners-up: Australia
- Third: Canada

Series details
- Top try scorer: Stacey Fluhler (31)
- Top point scorer: Alev Kelter (171)

The 2019–20 World Rugby Women's Sevens Series was the eighth edition of the global circuit for women's national rugby sevens teams, organised by World Rugby.

Only five of the originally scheduled eight tournaments were completed before the series was cut short due to the COVID-19 pandemic. New Zealand was awarded the series title at the end of June 2020, on account of it leading by 16 points over the second-placed Australia.

The events planned for Hong Kong, Langford and Paris were postponed, before eventually being cancelled.

== Format ==
Twelve nations competed at each event, drawn into three pools of four teams. The top-placed teams after the pool matches at each tournament played off for a Cup, with gold, silver and bronze medals also awarded to the first three teams. The winner of the series was determined by the overall points standings gained across all events in the season.

== Teams ==
The eleven "core teams" qualified to participate in all series events for 2019–20 were:

- Australia
- Brazil
- Canada
- England
- Fiji
- France
- Ireland
- New Zealand
- Russia
- Spain
- United States

Brazil was promoted to core team status after winning the World Series qualifier held in Hong Kong in 2019, replacing China who were relegated after finishing as the lowest-placed core team in 2018–19.

== Tour venues ==
The original itinerary for the 2019–20 women's circuit included three new legs to be played in Cape Town, Hamilton and Hong Kong, although only the first two were able to be played. The women's Tokyo Sevens was not included in the series due to the Olympic Sevens being scheduled there instead.

After all tournaments planned for the second quarter of 2020 were cancelled, the series was reduced from eight legs to five. All but one of the completed legs were combined sevens tournaments with their corresponding events from the men's World Series, with only the Glendale tournament hosted as a stand-alone women's event.

2019–20 Itinerary
| Leg | Stadium | City | Dates | Winner |
|---|---|---|---|---|
| United States | Infinity Park | Glendale (Denver) | 5–6 October 2019 | United States |
| Dubai | The Sevens | Dubai | 5–7 December 2019 | New Zealand |
| South Africa | Cape Town Stadium | Cape Town | 13–15 December 2019 | New Zealand |
| New Zealand | Waikato Stadium | Hamilton | 25–26 January 2020 | New Zealand |
| Australia | Bankwest Stadium | Sydney | 1–2 February 2020 | New Zealand |

The tournaments planned for Hong Kong (3–5 April 2020), Langford (2–3 May 2020) and Paris (30–31 May 2020), were ultimately cancelled due to health concerns related to the COVID-19 pandemic.

== Standings ==
Final standings for the 2018–19 series:

2019–20 World Rugby Women's – Series VIII
| Pos. | Event Team | Glendale | Dubai | Cape Town | Hamilton | Sydney | Points total |
|---|---|---|---|---|---|---|---|
| 1 | New Zealand | 16 | 20 | 20 | 20 | 20 | 96 |
| 2 | Australia | 18 | 14 | 18 | 14 | 16 | 80 (Note: Point differential: Australia +367, Canada +233.) |
| 3 | Canada | 10 | 18 | 16 | 18 | 18 | 80 |
| 4 | France | 14 | 12 | 14 | 16 | 14 | 70 |
| 5 | United States | 20 | 16 | 12 | 12 | 6 | 66 |
| 6 | Russia | 8 | 10 | 6 | 8 | 8 | 40 |
| 7 | Fiji | 2 | 8 | 10 | 6 | 12 | 38 |
| 8 | England | 4 | 4 | 8 | 10 | 10 | 36 |
| 9 | Spain | 12 | 6 | 4 | 3 | 3 | 28 |
| 10 | Ireland | 6 | 3 | 2 | 2 | 2 | 15 |
| 11 | Japan | 3 | 1 | — | — | 4 | 8 |
| 12 | Brazil (Note: World Rugby announced that there would be no relegation from the 2019–20 core teams as the inaugural Challenger Series qualifying event for women's teams scheduled for March 2020 was not able to take place. Therefore, Brazil, who would have been relegated as the lowest placed core team, re-qualified as a core team for the next World Rugby Women's Sevens Series.) | 1 | 2 | 1 | 1 | 1 | 6 |
| 13 | China | — | — | — | 4 | — | 4 |
| 14 | South Africa | — | — | 3 | — | — | 3 |

Source: World Rugby

Event medalists
| Gold | Event Champions |
| Silver | Event Runner-ups |
| Bronze | Event Third place finishers |
Qualification for the 2019–20 World Rugby Women's Sevens
| No colour | Core team in 2019–20 and re-qualified as a core team for the next World Rugby Women's Sevens Series |
| Yellow | Invitational team |

== Placings summary ==
Tallies of top four tournament placings during the 2019–20 series, by team:

| Team | (gold) Gold | (silver) Silver | (bronze) Bronze | Fourth | Total |
|---|---|---|---|---|---|
| New Zealand | 4 | – | 1 | – | 5 |
| United States | 1 | – | 1 | – | 2 |
| Canada | – | 3 | 1 | – | 4 |
| Australia | – | 2 | 1 | 2 | 5 |
| France | – | – | 1 | 3 | 4 |
| Totals | 5 | 5 | 5 | 5 | 20 |

== Tournaments ==
=== Glendale ===
| Event | Winners | Score | Finalists | Semifinalists |
|---|---|---|---|---|
| Cup | United States | 26–7 | Australia | New Zealand (Bronze); France |
| 5th Place | Spain | 12–7 | Canada | Russia; Ireland |
| Challenge Trophy | England | 36–14 | Japan | Brazil; Fiji |

=== Dubai* ===
| Event | Winners | Score | Finalists | Semifinalists |
|---|---|---|---|---|
| Cup | New Zealand | 17–14 | Canada | United States (Bronze); Australia |
| 9th Place | England | 26–21 | Ireland | - |
| 11th Place | Brazil | 14-12 | Japan | - |

=== Cape Town* ===
| Event | Winners | Score | Finalists | Semifinalists |
|---|---|---|---|---|
| Cup | New Zealand | 17–7 | Australia | Canada (Bronze); France |
| 9th Place | Spain | 19–7 | South Africa | - |
| 11th Place | Ireland | 26-7 | Brazil | - |

* 5th Place and Challenge Trophy not contested

== Players ==
=== Tries scored ===
| Rank | Player | Tries |
|---|---|---|
| 1 | (New Zealand) Stacey Fluhler | 31 |
| 2 | (Australia) Ellia Green | 26 |
| 3 | (United States) Alev Kelter | 21 |
| 4 | (Canada) Bianca Farella | 18 |
| 5 | (Australia) Emma Tonegato | 18 |

=== Points scored ===
| Rank | Player | Points |
|---|---|---|
| 1 | (United States) Alev Kelter | 171 |
| 2 | (Canada) Ghislaine Landry | 170 |
| 3 | (Australia) Ellia Green | 164 |
| 4 | (New Zealand) Stacey Fluhler | 155 |
| 5 | (New Zealand) Tyla Nathan-Wong | 139 |

Updated: 4 February 2020

=== Awards ===
Impact player awards
| Tour Leg | Player | Points |
|---|---|---|
| Glendale | (Australia) Charlotte Caslick | 63 |
| Dubai | (New Zealand) Stacey Fluhler | 78 |
| Cape Town | (France) Séraphine Okemba | 58 |
| Hamilton | (New Zealand) Michaela Blyde | 59 |
| Sydney | (France) Shannon Izar | 56 |

Total impact player points
| Pos | Player | T | B | O | C | Total |
|---|---|---|---|---|---|---|
| 1 | (New Zealand) Stacey Fluhler | 16 | 38 | 24 | 101 | 279 |
| 2 | (Australia) Emma Tonegato | 51 | 18 | 16 | 105 | 242 |
| 3 | (France) Coralie Bertrand | 48 | 10 | 30 | 84 | 222 |
| 4 | (Canada) Bianca Farella | 47 | 16 | 15 | 95 | 220 |
| 5 | (New Zealand) Kelly Brazier | 73 | 12 | 15 | 80 | 219 |
| 6 | (United States) Alev Kelter | 27 | 23 | 10 | 101 | 217 |
| 7 | (Australia) Ellia Green | 26 | 24 | 11 | 90 | 210 |
| 8 | (Fiji) Ana Maria Naimasi | 27 | 17 | 21 | 71 | 191 |
| 9 | (France) Camille Grassineau | 56 | 6 | 18 | 73 | 183 |
| 10 | (Russia) Baizat Khamidova | 42 | 10 | 18 | 73 | 181 |

Updated: 4 February 2020

== See also ==
- 2019–20 World Rugby Sevens Series (for men)
- Rugby sevens at the 2020 Summer Olympics

== Sources ==
- "Terms of participation: HSBC World Rugby Women's Sevens Series" (PDF). World Rugby. 2018.
