= 2019 USA Women's Sevens =

- Women's Sevens Series VIII
- Host nation: United States
- Date: 5–6 October 2019

Cup
- Champion: United States
- Runner-up: Australia
- Third: New Zealand

Tournament details
- Matches played: 32

The 2019 USA Women's Sevens was a rugby sevens tournament that takes place at Infinity Park in Glendale, Colorado between the 5-6 October 2019. It was the seventh time that the USA Women's Sevens have been held as an World Series event and was the first tournament of the 2019–20 World Rugby Women's Sevens Series.

In the cup final, the United States won their first USA Women's Sevens since the tournament became a World Series event as they defeated Australia 26–7 in the final. New Zealand came home in third place after defeating France 31–14 while England won the Challenge Trophy over Japan.

== Background ==
The 2019 USA Women's Sevens is the first round of eight tournaments for the 2019–20 World Rugby Women's Sevens Series and the seventh since the tournament became a part of the World Series. During the off-season, qualifying for the 2020 Summer Olympics continued in the continental with England qualifying through to the Olympic Games as Great Britain with a 19-0 victory over Russia. France joined Russia in qualifying for the repcharge event.

== Format ==
The twelve teams are drawn into three pools of four teams each with each team playing their other three opponents in their pool once. Points are awarded in each pool on the standard schedule for rugby sevens tournaments (though different from the standard in the 15-man game)—3 for a win, 2 for a draw, 1 for a loss. The top two teams from each pool advance to the Cup brackets while the top two third place teams also compete in the Cup. The remaining four teams will compete in the Challenge Trophy.

== Teams ==
Twelve teams will compete in the tournament with eleven teams being core teams to the Sevens Series. The twelfth team, Japan was invited to the tournament.

- Australia
- Brazil
- Canada
- England
- Fiji
- France
- Ireland
- Japan
- New Zealand
- Russia
- Spain
- United States

== Pool stage ==
Key to colours in group tables
Teams that advanced to the Cup Quarterfinal

=== Pool A ===
Team	Pld	W	D	L	PF	PA	PD	Pts
New Zealand	3	3	0	0	116	19	+97	9
Russia	3	2	0	1	79	62	+17	7
England	3	1	0	2	43	88	−45	5
Japan	3	0	0	3	21	90	−69	3

5 October 2019
11:21

England	22–38	Russia

Infinity Park, Glendale

5 October 2019
11:43

New Zealand	40–7	Japan

Infinity Park, Glendale

5 October 2019
14:05

England	21–14	Japan

Infinity Park, Glendale

5 October 2019
14:27

New Zealand	40–12	Russia

Infinity Park, Glendale

5 October 2019
17:05

Russia	29–0	Japan

Infinity Park, Glendale

5 October 2019
17:33

New Zealand	36–0	England

Infinity Park, Glendale

=== Pool B ===
Team	Pld	W	D	L	PF	PA	PD	Pts
France	3	3	0	0	90	26	+64	9
United States	3	2	0	1	86	31	+55	7
Ireland	3	1	0	2	42	90	−48	5
Brazil	3	0	0	3	12	93	−81	3

5 October 2019
10:37

France	28–7	Ireland

Infinity Park, Glendale

5 October 2019
10:59

United States	27–0	Brazil

Infinity Park, Glendale

5 October 2019
13:21

France	38–5	Brazil

Infinity Park, Glendale

5 October 2019
13:43

United States	45–7	Ireland

Infinity Park, Glendale

5 October 2019
16:05

Ireland	28–7	Brazil

Infinity Park, Glendale

5 October 2019
16:35

United States	14–24	France

Infinity Park, Glendale

=== Pool C ===
Team	Pld	W	D	L	PF	PA	PD	Pts
Australia	3	2	1	0	92	38	+54	8
Canada	3	2	1	0	76	47	+29	8
Spain	3	1	0	2	48	71	−23	5
Fiji	3	0	0	3	35	95	−60	3

5 October 2019
9:53

Australia	31–5	Spain

Infinity Park, Glendale

5 October 2019
10:15

Canada	31–7	Fiji

Infinity Park, Glendale

5 October 2019
12:37

Australia	35–7	Fiji

Infinity Park, Glendale

5 October 2019
12:59

Canada	19–14	Spain

Infinity Park, Glendale

5 October 2019
15:21

Spain	29–21	Fiji

Infinity Park, Glendale

5 October 2019
15:43

Canada	26–26	Australia

Infinity Park, Glendale

== Knockout stage ==
=== Challenge Trophy ===
Semi-finals
6 October 2019 – 11:39 – Infinity Park
England	34
Brazil	14
6 October 2019 – 12:01 – Infinity Park
Fiji	19
Japan	21

Challenge Trophy Final
6 October 2019 – 15:37 – Infinity Park
England	36
Japan	14

Matches

Semi-finals

6 October 2019	England	34–14	Brazil	Infinity Park, Glendale
11:39

6 October 2019	Fiji	19–21	Japan	Infinity Park, Glendale
12:01

Challenge Trophy Final

6 October 2019	England	36–14	Japan	Infinity Park, Glendale
15:37

=== Fifth place ===
Semi-finals
6 October 2019 – 13:17 – Infinity Park
Spain	24
Russia	19
6 October 2019 – 13:39 – Infinity Park
Canada	40
Ireland	14

Final
6 October 2019 – 16:01 – Infinity Park
Spain	12
Canada	7

Matches

Semi-finals

6 October 2019	Spain	24–19	Russia	Infinity Park, Glendale
13:17

6 October 2019	Canada	40–14	Ireland	Infinity Park, Glendale
13:39

Fifth place

6 October 2019	Spain	12–7	Canada	Infinity Park, Glendale
16:01

=== Cup ===
Quarter-finals
6 October 2019 – 10:11 – Infinity Park
France	26
Spain	7
6 October 2019 – 10:33 – Infinity Park
Australia	38
Russia	0
6 October 2019 – 10:55 – Infinity Park
United States	29
Canada	26
6 October 2019 – 11:17 – Infinity Park
New Zealand	36
Ireland	10

Semi-finals
6 October 2019 – 14:01 – Infinity Park
France	0
Australia	40
6 October 2019 – 14:23 – Infinity Park
United States	19
New Zealand	17

Cup Final
6 October 2019 – 16:58 – Infinity Park
Australia	7
United States	26
Third place
6 October 2019 – 16:28 – Infinity Park
France	14
New Zealand	31

Matches

Quarter-finals

6 October 2019	France	26–7	Spain	Infinity Park, Glendale
10:11

6 October 2019	Australia	38–0	Russia	Infinity Park, Glendale
10:33

6 October 2019	Canada	29–26	United States	Infinity Park, Glendale
10:55

6 October 2019	New Zealand	36–10	Ireland	Infinity Park, Glendale
11:17

Semi-finals

6 October 2019	France	0–40	Australia	Infinity Park, Glendale
14:01		Report

6 October 2019	United States	19–17	New Zealand	Infinity Park, Glendale
14:23		Report

3rd place

6 October 2019	France	14–31	New Zealand	Infinity Park, Glendale
16:28		Report

Cup Final

6 October 2019	Australia	7–26	United States	Infinity Park, Glendale
16:58		Report

== Tournament placings ==
Place	Team	Points
1st place, gold medalist(s)	United States	20
2nd place, silver medalist(s)	Australia	18
3rd place, bronze medalist(s)	New Zealand	16
4	France	14
5	Spain	12
6	Canada	10
7	Russia	8
8	Ireland	6
9	England	4
10	Japan	3
11	Fiji	2
12	Brazil	1

Source: World Rugby

== Players ==
=== Scoring leaders ===
Tries scored
Rank	Player	Tries
1	(Australia) Emma Tonegato	9
2	(Australia) Charlotte Caslick	7
3	(Australia) Ellia Green	6
3	(New Zealand) Kelly Brazier	6
3	(New Zealand) Michaela Blyde	6
3	(New Zealand) Stacey Waaka	6

Source: World Rugby Archived 2019-10-07 at the Wayback Machine

Points scored
Rank	Player	Points
1	(Australia) Emma Tonegato	45
2	(Australia) Ellia Green	40
2	(Canada) Ghislaine Landry	40
4	(New Zealand) Kelly Brazier	38
5	(United States) Alev Kelter	36

Source: World Rugby Archived 2019-06-24 at the Wayback Machine

=== Dream Team ===
The following seven players were selected for the tournament Dream Team at the conclusion of the tournament:

Backs	Forwards
(Australia) Charlotte Caslick; (United States) Kristi Kirshe; (New Zealand) Kelly Brazier; (Australia) Emma Tonegato	(United States) Cheta Emba; (France) Chloé Pelle; (New Zealand) Stacey Waaka

== See also ==
- World Rugby Sevens Series (for men)
- World Rugby

Women's Sevens Series VIII
Preceded by None (first event)	2019 USA Women's Sevens	Succeeded by 2019 Dubai Women's Sevens
USA Women's Sevens
Preceded by 2018 USA Women's Sevens	2019 USA Women's Sevens	Succeeded by 2020 USA Women's Sevens
