= 2019 Dubai Women's Sevens =

- Women's Sevens Series VIII
- Host nation: United Arab Emirates
- Date: 5–7 December 2019

Cup
- Champion: New Zealand
- Runner-up: Canada
- Third: United States

Tournament details
- Matches played: 34

The 2019 Dubai Women's Sevens will be a tournament held at The Sevens Stadium in Dubai, United Arab Emirates from 5–7 December 2019. It will be the ninth edition of the Dubai Women's Sevens and will also be the second tournament of the 2019–20 World Rugby Women's Sevens Series.

== Format ==
The teams are drawn into three pools of four teams each. Each team plays every other team in their pool once. The top two teams from each pool advance to the Cup/Plate brackets while the top 2 third place teams also compete in the Cup/Plate. The other teams from each group play-off for the Challenge Trophy.

== Teams ==
Twelve teams will compete in the tournament with eleven being the core teams that compete throughout the entire season. The invited team for this tournament is Japan who was invited after last competing in the previous round.

- Australia
- Brazil
- Canada
- England
- Fiji
- France
- Ireland
- Japan
- New Zealand
- Russia
- Spain
- United States

== Pool stage ==
Key to colours in group tables
Teams that advanced to the Cup Quarterfinal

=== Pool A ===
Team	Pld	W	D	L	PF	PA	PD	Pts
United States	3	3	0	0	96	31	65	9
Canada	3	2	0	1	77	53	24	7
Russia	3	1	0	2	55	64	-9	5
Brazil	3	0	0	3	14	94	-80	3

5 December 2019

Canada	24–19	Russia

The Sevens, Dubai

5 December 2019

United States	29–7	Brazil

The Sevens, Dubai

6 December 2019

Canada	43–0	Brazil

The Sevens, Dubai

6 December 2019

United States	33–14	Russia

The Sevens, Dubai

6 December 2019

Russia	22–7	Brazil

The Sevens, Dubai

6 December 2019

United States	34–10	Canada

The Sevens, Dubai

=== Pool B ===
Team	Pld	W	D	L	PF	PA	PD	Pts
Australia	3	3	0	0	114	10	104	9
Fiji	3	1	1	1	47	69	-22	6
Spain	3	1	1	1	36	67	-31	6
Ireland	3	0	0	3	27	78	-51	3

5 December 2019

Spain	12–10	Ireland

The Sevens, Dubai

5 December 2019

Australia	38–0	Fiji

The Sevens, Dubai

6 December 2019

Spain	19–19	Fiji

The Sevens, Dubai

6 December 2019

Australia	38–5	Ireland

The Sevens, Dubai

6 December 2019

Ireland	12–28	Fiji

The Sevens, Dubai

6 December 2019

Australia	38–5	Spain

The Sevens, Dubai

=== Pool C ===
Team	Pld	W	D	L	PF	PA	PD	Pts
France	3	3	0	0	69	21	48	9
New Zealand	3	2	0	1	102	31	71	7
England	3	1	0	2	43	83	-40	5
Japan	3	0	0	3	21	100	-79	3

5 December 2019

France	29–0	England

The Sevens, Dubai

5 December 2019

New Zealand	48–0	Japan

The Sevens, Dubai

6 December 2019

France	21–7	Japan

The Sevens, Dubai

6 December 2019

New Zealand	40–12	England

The Sevens, Dubai

6 December 2019

England	31–14	Japan

The Sevens, Dubai

6 December 2019

New Zealand	14–19	France

The Sevens, Dubai

== Placement matches ==
=== Eleventh place ===
7 December 2019
9:00

Japan	12–14	Brazil

The Sevens

=== Ninth place ===
7 December 2019
9:22

England	26–21	Ireland

The Sevens

== Knockout stage ==
=== Cup ===
Quarter-finals
7 December – The Sevens Stadium
Australia	21
Spain	0
7 December – The Sevens Stadium
France	7
Canada	19
7 December – The Sevens Stadium
Fiji	10
New Zealand	24
7 December – The Sevens Stadium
United States	28
Russia	7

Semi-finals
7 December – The Sevens Stadium
Australia	12
Canada	26
7 December – The Sevens Stadium
New Zealand	24
United States	7

Cup Final
7 December – The Sevens Stadium
Canada	14
New Zealand	17
Third place
7 December – The Sevens Stadium
Australia	7
United States	24

Matches

Quarter-finals

7 December 2019	Australia	21–0	Spain	The Sevens Stadium
9:44

7 December 2019	France	7–19	Canada	The Sevens Stadium
10:06

7 December 2019	Fiji	10–24	New Zealand	The Sevens Stadium
10:28

7 December 2019	United States	28–7	Russia	The Sevens Stadium
10:50

Semi-finals

7 December 2019	Australia	12–26	Canada	The Sevens Stadium
14:14

7 December 2019	New Zealand	24–7	United States	The Sevens Stadium
14:36

3rd place

7 December 2019	Australia	7–24	United States	The Sevens Stadium
17:38

Cup Final

7 December 2019	Canada	14–17	New Zealand	The Sevens Stadium
18:33

== Tournament placings ==
Place	Team	Points
1st place, gold medalist(s)	New Zealand	20
2nd place, silver medalist(s)	Canada	18
3rd place, bronze medalist(s)	United States	16
4	Australia	14
5	France	12
6	Russia	10

Place	Team	Points
7	Fiji	8
8	Spain	6
9	England	4
10	Ireland	3
11	Brazil	2
12	Japan	1

Source: World Rugby

== See also ==
- World Rugby Women's Sevens Series
- 2019–20 World Rugby Women's Sevens Series
- 2019 South Africa Sevens

== See also ==
- World Rugby Women's Sevens Series
- 2019–20 World Rugby Women's Sevens Series
- 2019 Dubai Sevens
