= Kenya at the 2020 Summer Olympics =

- IOC code: KEN
- NOC: National Olympic Committee of Kenya
- Website: teamkenya.or.ke

in Tokyo, Japan July 23, 2021 – August 8, 2021
- Competitors: 85 in 6 sports
- Flag bearers (opening): Mercy Moim; Andrew Amonde
- Flag bearer (closing): Timothy Cheruiyot
- Medals Ranked 19th: Gold 4 Silver 4 Bronze 2 Total 10

Summer Olympics appearances (overview)
- 1956; 1960; 1964; 1968; 1972; 1976–1980; 1984; 1988; 1992; 1996; 2000; 2004; 2008; 2012; 2016; 2020; 2024

Kenya competed at the 2020 Summer Olympics in Tokyo. Originally scheduled to take place from 24 July to 9 August 2020, the Games were postponed to 23 July to 8 August 2021, because of the COVID-19 pandemic. It was the nation's fifteenth appearance at the Summer Olympics since its debut in 1956, having boycotted the 1976 Montreal and 1980 Moscow Games.

Kenya's medal tally was slightly down from 6 gold and 13 total medals in 2016, but it still won far more medals than any other African nation.

== Medalists ==
Medal	Name	Sport	Event	Date
Gold	Emmanuel Korir	Athletics	Men's 800 metres	August 4
Gold	Faith Kipyegon	Athletics	Women's 1500 metres	August 6
Gold	Peres Jepchirchir	Athletics	Women's marathon	August 7
Gold	Eliud Kipchoge	Athletics	Men's marathon	August 8
Silver	Hellen Obiri	Athletics	Women's 5000 metres	August 2
Silver	Ferguson Rotich	Athletics	Men's 800 metres	August 4
Silver	Brigid Kosgei	Athletics	Women's marathon	August 7
Silver	Timothy Cheruiyot	Athletics	Men's 1500 metres	August 7
Bronze	Benjamin Kigen	Athletics	Men's 3000 metres steeplechase	August 2
Bronze	Hyvin Kiyeng Jepkemoi	Athletics	Women's 3000 metres steeplechase	August 4

== Competitors ==
The following is the list of number of competitors in the Games.

Sport	Men	Women	Total
Athletics	22	18	40
Beach volleyball	0	2	2
Boxing	2	2	4
Rugby sevens	13	13	26
Swimming	1	1	2
Taekwondo	0	1	1
Volleyball	0	12	12
Total	38	49	87

== Athletics ==
Kenyan athletes further achieved the entry standards, either by qualifying time or by world ranking, in the following track and field events (up to a maximum of 3 athletes in each event):

Six marathon runners (three per gender) were named to the Kenyan team on January 31, 2020, with defending champions Eliud Kipchoge and Vivian Cheruiyot racing at their fourth and fifth Olympics, respectively. The rest of the track and field team was officially announced on June 19, 2021, including Rio 2016 medalists Hellen Obiri (women's 10000 m), Julius Yego (men's javelin throw), and the reigning middle-distance champion Faith Kipyegon.

Key

- Note–Ranks given for track events are within the athlete's heat only
- Q = Qualified for the next round
- q = Qualified for the next round as a fastest loser or, in field events, by position without achieving the qualifying target
- NR = National record
- N/A = Round not applicable for the event
- Bye = Athlete not required to compete in round

Track & road events
Men

Athlete	Event	Heat		Quarterfinal		Semifinal		Final	
Athlete	Event	Result	Rank	Result	Rank	Result	Rank	Result	Rank
Mark Odhiambo	100 m	Bye		DNS		Did not advance			
Ferdinand Omurwa	100 m	Bye		10.01 NR	3 Q	10.00 NR	3	Did not advance	
Emmanuel Korir	400 m	DSQ		—		Did not advance			
Emmanuel Korir	800 m	1:45.33	1 Q	—		1:44.74	2 Q	1:45.06	1st place, gold medalist(s)
Ferguson Rotich	800 m	1:43.75	1 Q	—		1:44.04	1 Q	1:45.23	2nd place, silver medalist(s)
Michael Saruni	800 m	1:45.21	2 Q	—		1:44.55 SB	8	Did not advance	
Timothy Cheruiyot	1500 m	3:36.01	2 Q	—		3:33.95	3 Q	3:29.01	2nd place, silver medalist(s)
Abel Kipsang	1500 m	3:40.68	1 Q	—		3:31.65 OR	1 Q	3:29.56 PB	4
Charles Simotwo	1500 m	3:37.26	10 q	—		3:34.61	6	Did not advance	
Daniel Ebenyo	5000 m	13:41.64	10	—				Did not advance	
Nicholas Kimeli	5000 m	13:38.87	1 Q	—				12:59.17 SB	4
Samwel Masai	5000 m	DNS		—				Did not advance	
Rhonex Kipruto	10000 m	—						27:52.78	9
Rodgers Kwemoi	10000 m	—						27:50.06	7
Weldon Kipkurui Langat	10000 m	—						28:41.42	20
Leonard Bett	3000 m steeplechase	8:19:62	5	—				Did not advance	
Abraham Kibiwott	3000 m steeplechase	8:12.25	1 Q	—				8:19.41	10
Benjamin Kigen	3000 m steeplechase	8:10.80 SB	3 Q	—				8:11.45	3rd place, bronze medalist(s)
Lawrence Cherono	Marathon	—						2:10:02	4
Eliud Kipchoge	Marathon	—						2:08:38	1st place, gold medalist(s)
Amos Kipruto	Marathon	—						DNF	

Women

Athlete	Event	Heat		Semifinal		Final	
Athlete	Event	Result	Rank	Result	Rank	Result	Rank
Hellen Syombua	400 m	52.70	5	Did not advance			
Mary Moraa	800 m	2:01.66	3 Q	2:00.47	3	Did not advance	
Eunice Sum	800 m	2:03.00	6	Did not advance			
Emily Cherotich Tuei	800 m	2:08.08 PB	8	Did not advance			
Winnie Chebet	1500 m	4:03.93	10 Q	4:11.62	13	Did not advance	
Edinah Jebitok	1500 m	4:10.72	36	Did not advance			
Faith Kipyegon	1500 m	4:01.40	1 Q	3:56.80	1 Q	3:53.11 OR	1st place, gold medalist(s)
Hellen Obiri	5000 m	14:55.77	2 Q	—		14:38.36	2nd place, silver medalist(s)
Lilian Kasait Rengeruk	5000 m	14:50.36 SB	5 Q	—		14:55.85	12
Agnes Jebet Tirop	5000 m	14:48.01 SB	2 Q	—		14:39.62 SB	4
Sheila Chelangat	10000 m	—				31:48.23	16
Irene Chepet Cheptai	10000 m	—				30:44.00 PB'	6
Hellen Obiri	10000 m	—				30:24.27 PB	4
Beatrice Chepkoech	3000 m steeplechase	9:19.82	3 Q	—		9:16.33	7
Hyvin Kiyeng Jepkemoi	3000 m steeplechase	9:23.17	1 Q	—		9:05.39	3rd place, bronze medalist(s)
Purity Cherotich Kirui	3000 m steeplechase	9:30.13	5	—		Did not advance	
Ruth Chepngetich	Marathon	—				DNF	
Peres Jepchirchir	Marathon	—				2:27:20 SB	1st place, gold medalist(s)
Brigid Kosgei	Marathon	—				2:27:36 SB	2nd place, silver medalist(s)

Field events

Athlete	Event	Qualification		Final	
Athlete	Event	Distance	Position	Distance	Position
Mathew Sawe	Men's high jump	2.17	=30	Did not advance	
Julius Yego	Men's javelin throw	77.34 SB	24	Did not advance	

== Boxing ==
Kenya entered four boxers (two per gender) into the Olympic tournament. Rio 2016 Olympian Nick Okoth (men's featherweight) and rookie Christine Ongare (women's flyweight) secured places in their respective weight divisions, with the former advancing to the final match and the latter scoring a box-off victory at the 2020 African Qualification Tournament in Diamniadio, Senegal. Elly Ajowi Ochola (men's heavyweight) and Elizabeth Akinyi (women's welterweight) completed the nation's boxing lineup by topping the list of eligible boxers from Africa in their respective weight divisions of the IOC's Boxing Task Force Rankings.

Athlete	Event	Round of 32	Round of 16	Quarterfinals	Semifinals	Final	
Athlete	Event	Opposition Result	Opposition Result	Opposition Result	Opposition Result	Opposition Result	Rank
Nick Okoth	Men's featherweight	Erdenebatyn (MGL); L 2–3	Did not advance				
Elly Ajowi Ochola	Men's heavyweight	Bye	La Cruz (CUB); L 0–5	Did not advance			
Christine Ongare	Women's flyweight	Magno (PHI); L 0–5	Did not advance				
Elizabeth Akinyi	Women's welterweight	Bye	Panguana (MOZ); L RSC	Did not advance			

== Rugby sevens ==
Summary

Team	Event	Group stage				Quarterfinal/Classification	Semifinal/Classification	Final / BM	
Team	Event	Opposition Score	Opposition Score	Opposition Score	Rank	Opposition Score	Opposition Score	Opposition Score	Rank
Kenya men's	Men's tournament	United States; L 14–19	South Africa; L 5–14	Ireland; L 7–12	4	—	Japan; W 21–7	Ireland; W 22–0	9
Kenya women's	Women's tournament	New Zealand; L 7–29	ROC; L 12–35	Great Britain; L 0–31	4	—	Japan; W 21–17	Canada; L 10–24	10

=== Men's tournament ===
Kenya national rugby sevens team qualified for the Games by securing a lone outright berth with a gold-medal victory at the 2019 Africa Men's Sevens in Johannesburg, South Africa.

Team roster

Kenya's 12-man squad plus one alternate was named on 6 July 2021.

Head coach: Innocent Simiyu

No.	Pos.	Player	Date of birth (age)	Events	Points
1	BK	Daniel Taabu	19 January 1996 (aged 25)	15	216
2	FW	Herman Humwa	8 November 1995 (aged 25)	12	10
3	FW	Alvin Otieno	19 April 1994 (aged 27)	10	55
4	FW	Vincent Onyala	10 December 1996 (aged 24)	15	177
5	BK	Billy Odhiambo	26 June 1994 (aged 27)	48	440
6	BK	Jeff Oluoch	2 April 1995 (aged 26)	22	160
7	BK	Eden Agero	17 September 1990 (aged 30)	32	273
8	FW	Andrew Amonde (c)	25 December 1983 (aged 37)	76	320
9	BK	Nelson Oyoo	26 June 1994 (aged 27)	36	230
11	BK	Collins Injera (c)	18 October 1986 (aged 34)	83	1,443
10	BK	Johnstone Olindi	4 November 1999 (aged 21)	13	132
12	FW	Willy Ambaka	14 May 1990 (aged 31)	51	615
13	BK	Jacob Ojee	7 March 1991 (aged 30)	12	65

Group play

Pos	Team	Pld	W	D	L	PF	PA	PD	Pts	Qualification
1	South Africa	3	3	0	0	64	31	+33	9	Quarter-finals
2	United States	3	2	0	1	50	48	+2	7	Quarter-finals
3	Ireland	3	1	0	2	43	59	−16	5	
4	Kenya	3	0	0	3	26	45	−19	3	

Updated to match(es) played on 26 July 2021. Source: Tokyo 2020 and World Rugby
Rules for classification: 1) Points; 2) Head-to-head result; 3) Point difference; 4) Points scored.

26 July 2021
11:30

United States	19–14	Kenya
Try: Isles 2' m Iosefo 4' c Hughes 13' c Con: Hughes (1/2) 5'; Tomasin (1/1) 14'	(Tokyo 2020)	Try: Injera 6' c Oluoch 9' c Con: Agero (2/2) 7', 10'

Tokyo Stadium, Tokyo
Attendance: 0
Referee: Jordan Way (Australia)

26 July 2021
19:00

South Africa	14–5	Kenya
Try: S. Davids 2' c Soyizwapi 3' c Con: du Preez (2/2) 2', 4'	(Tokyo 2020)	Try: Injera 6' m Con: Agero (0/1)

Tokyo Stadium, Tokyo
Attendance: 0
Referee: Damon Murphy (Australia)

27 July 2021
11:00

Kenya	7–12	Ireland
Try: Onyala 13' c Con: Taabu (1/1) 13'	(Tokyo 2020)	Try: Lennox 1' m McNulty 2' c Con: Dardis (1/2) 2'

Tokyo Stadium, Tokyo
Attendance: 0
Referee: Jordan Way (Australia)

27 July 2021
17:00

Kenya	21–7	Japan
Try: Otieno 3' c Oluoch 5' c Amonde 12' c Con: Olindi (3/3) 4', 5', 12'	(Tokyo 2020)	Try: Matsui 1' c Con: Kano (1/1) 2'

Tokyo Stadium, Tokyo
Attendance: 0
Referee: Damián Schneider (Argentina)

28 July 2021
9:30

Ireland	0–22	Kenya
	(Tokyo 2020)	Try: Olindi 5' c Ojee 10' m Ambaka 12' m Taabu 14' m Con: Olindi (1/1) 5'; Taabu (0/2); Amonde (0/1)

Tokyo Stadium, Tokyo
Attendance: 0
Referee: Damián Schneider (Argentina)

=== Women's tournament ===
Kenya women's national rugby sevens team qualified for the Games by winning the silver medal and securing a lone outright berth at the 2019 Africa Women's Sevens in Jemmal, Tunisia, as the winners South Africa decided not to accept the berth under SASCOC's rules pertaining to continental qualification route.

Team roster

Kenya's squad of 13 players was named on 5 July 2021. Additionally, Enid Ouma was named as a non-travelling reserve athlete.

Head coach: Felix Oloo

- Grace Adhiambo
- Vivian Okwach
- Camilla Atieno
- Judith Okumu
- Sinaida Omondi
- Diana Ochieng
- Sheila Chajira
- Christabel Lindo
- Janet Okelo
- Philadelphia Olando (c)
- Sarah Ndunde
- Stellah Wafula
- Leah Wambui

Group play

Pos	Team	Pld	W	D	L	PF	PA	PD	Pts	Qualification
1	New Zealand	3	3	0	0	88	28	+60	9	Quarter-finals
2	Great Britain	3	2	0	1	66	38	+28	7	Quarter-finals
3	ROC	3	1	0	2	47	59	−12	5	Quarter-finals
4	Kenya	3	0	0	3	19	95	−76	3	

Source: Tokyo 2020 and World Rugby
Rules for classification: 1) Points; 2) Head-to-head result; 3) Point difference; 4) Points scored.

29 July 2021
11:30

New Zealand	29–7	Kenya
Try: Fluhler 1' m Blyde (2) 3' c, 9' c Woodman 5' m Broughton 11' m Con: Nathan-Wong (2/5) 3', 9'	(Tokyo 2020)	Try: Lindo 7' +1 c Con: Okulu (1/1) 7' +1

Tokyo Stadium, Tokyo

29 July 2021
19:00

ROC	35–12	Kenya
Try: Sozonova 2' c Seredina 4' c Shestakova 8' c Tiron 9' c Kukina 13' c Con: Seredina (4/4) 2', 4', 8', 9'; Lushina (1/1) 14'	(Tokyo 2020)	Try: Okelo (2) 5' c, 8' m Con: Ndunde (1/2) 5'

Tokyo Stadium, Tokyo

30 July 2021
11:00

Great Britain	31–0	Kenya
Try: Joyce (2) 1' c, 6' m Burton 3' m Jones 9' c Thomson 14' c Con: Hunt (1/3) 2'; Rowland (1/1) 9'; Aitchison (1/1) 14'	(Tokyo 2020)

Tokyo Stadium, Tokyo

30 July 2021
17:00

Kenya	21–17	Japan
Try: Okulu 3' c Omondi 7' c Atieno 14' +1 c Con: Okulu (3/3) 3', 8', 14' +1	(Tokyo 2020)	Try: Hara 1' m Koide 8' m Kajiki 10' c Con: Yamanaka (1/3) 10'

Tokyo Stadium, Tokyo

31 July 2021
9:30

Canada	24–10	Kenya
Try: Williams 1' c Farella 3' m, 8' m Landry 10' c Con: Landry (2/3) 1', 10'; Nicholas (0/1)	(Tokyo 2020)	Try: Okello 5' m Ochieng 13' m Con: Okulu (0/2)

Tokyo Stadium, Tokyo

== Swimming ==
Kenya received a universality invitation from FINA to send two top-ranked swimmers (one per gender) in their respective individual events to the Olympics, based on the FINA Points System of June 28, 2021.

Athlete	Event	Heat		Semifinal		Final	
Athlete	Event	Time	Rank	Time	Rank	Time	Rank
Danilo Rosafio	Men's 100 m freestyle	52.54	56	Did not advance			
Emily Muteti	Women's 50 m freestyle	26.31	43	Did not advance			

== Taekwondo ==
Kenya entered one athlete into the taekwondo competition at the Games for the first time since Beijing 2008. Faith Ogallo secured a spot in the women's heavyweight category (+67 kg) with a top two finish at the 2020 African Qualification Tournament in Rabat, Morocco.

Athlete	Event	Round of 16	Quarterfinals	Semifinals	Repechage	Final / BM	
Athlete	Event	Opposition Result	Opposition Result	Opposition Result	Opposition Result	Opposition Result	Rank
Faith Ogallo	Women's +67 kg	Mandić (SRB); L 0–13	Did not advance		Kowalczuk (POL); L 7–15	Did not advance	7

== Volleyball ==
=== Beach ===
Kenya women's beach volleyball team qualified directly for the Olympics by winning the gold medal at the 2018–2020 CAVB Continental Cup Final in Agadir, Morocco.

Athlete	Event	Preliminary round				Repechage	Round of 16	Quarterfinal	Semifinal	Final / BM	
Athlete	Event	Opposition Score	Opposition Score	Opposition Score	Rank	Opposition Score	Opposition Score	Opposition Score	Opposition Score	Opposition Score	Rank
Gaudencia Makokha; Brackcides Khadambi	Women's	Ana Patrícia / Rebecca (BRA); L (15–21, 9–21)	Claes / Sponcil (USA); L (8–21, 6–21)	Kravčenoka / Graudiņa (LAT); L (6–21, 14–21)	4	Did not advance					

=== Indoor ===
Summary

Team	Event	Group stage						Quarterfinal	Semifinal	Final / BM	
Team	Event	Opposition Score	Opposition Score	Opposition Score	Opposition Score	Opposition Score	Rank	Opposition Score	Opposition Score	Opposition Score	Rank
Kenya women's	Women's tournament	Japan; L 0–3	South Korea; L 0–3	Serbia; L 0–3	Dominican Republic; L 0–3	Brazil; L 0–3	6	Did not advance			

==== Women's tournament ====
Kenya women's volleyball team qualified for the Olympics by winning the pool round with three match points and securing an outright berth at the African Olympic Qualification Tournament in Yaoundé, Cameroon, marking the nation's recurrence to the sport for the first time since Athens 2004.

Team roster

The roster was announced on 26 June 2021.

Head coach: (Brazil) Luizomar de Moura

- 1 Jane Wacu S
- 4 Leonida Kasaya OH
- 5 Sharon Chepchumba OP
- 8 Joy Lusenaka S
- 10 Noel Murambi OH
- 12 Gladys Ekaru MB
- 13 Lorine Chebet MB
- 14 Mercy Moim (c) OH
- 15 Pamela Jepkirui OH
- 16 Agripina Kundu L
- 18 Emmaculate Chemtai OP
- 19 Edith Mukuvilani MB

Group play

Pos	Team	Pld	W	L	Pts	SW	SL	SR	SPW	SPL	SPR	Qualification
1	Brazil	5	5	0	14	15	3	5.000	434	315	1.378	Quarter-finals
2	Serbia	5	4	1	12	13	3	4.333	381	313	1.217	Quarter-finals
3	South Korea	5	3	2	7	9	10	0.900	374	415	0.901	Quarter-finals
4	Dominican Republic	5	2	3	8	10	10	1.000	411	406	1.012	Quarter-finals
5	Japan (H)	5	1	4	4	6	12	0.500	378	395	0.957	
6	Kenya	5	0	5	0	0	15	0.000	242	376	0.644	

Source: Tokyo 2020 and FIVB
Rules for classification: Tiebreakers
(H) Host

25 July 2021; 19:40	Japan	3–0	Kenya	Ariake Arena, Tokyo; Referees: Fabrice Collados (FRA), Hamid Al-Rousi (UAE)
25 July 2021; 19:40	(25–15, 25–11, 25–23); Results Statistics			Ariake Arena, Tokyo; Referees: Fabrice Collados (FRA), Hamid Al-Rousi (UAE)

27 July 2021; 21:45	South Korea	3–0	Kenya	Ariake Arena, Tokyo; Referees: Sumie Myoi (JPN), Evgeny Makshanov (RUS)
27 July 2021; 21:45	(25–14, 25–22, 26–24); Results Statistics			Ariake Arena, Tokyo; Referees: Sumie Myoi (JPN), Evgeny Makshanov (RUS)

29 July 2021; 14:20	Serbia	3–0	Kenya	Ariake Arena, Tokyo; Referees: Hamid Al-Rousi (UAE), Sumie Myoi (JPN)
29 July 2021; 14:20	(25–21, 25–11, 25–20); Results Statistics			Ariake Arena, Tokyo; Referees: Hamid Al-Rousi (UAE), Sumie Myoi (JPN)

31 July 2021; 09:00	Dominican Republic	3–0	Kenya	Ariake Arena, Tokyo; Referees: Kang Joo-hee (KOR), Patricia Rolf (USA)
31 July 2021; 09:00	(25–19, 25–18, 25–10); Results Statistics			Ariake Arena, Tokyo; Referees: Kang Joo-hee (KOR), Patricia Rolf (USA)

2 August 2021; 21:45	Brazil	3–0	Kenya	Ariake Arena, Tokyo; Referees: Vladimir Simonović (SRB), Daniele Rapisarda (ITA)
2 August 2021; 21:45	(25–10, 25–16, 25–8); Results Statistics			Ariake Arena, Tokyo; Referees: Vladimir Simonović (SRB), Daniele Rapisarda (ITA)
