= Kenya at the 2018 Commonwealth Games =

- Flag of Kenya
- CG code: KEN
- CGA: National Olympic Committee of Kenya

in Gold Coast, Australia 4 April 2018 – 15 April 2018
- Competitors: 136 in 14 sports
- Flag bearer: Elijah Manangoi (opening)
- Medals Ranked 14th: Gold 4 Silver 7 Bronze 6 Total 17

Commonwealth Games appearances (overview)
- 1954; 1958; 1962; 1966; 1970; 1974; 1978; 1982; 1986; 1990; 1994; 1998; 2002; 2006; 2010; 2014; 2018; 2022; 2026; 2030

Kenya competed at the 2018 Commonwealth Games in the Gold Coast, Australia from April 4 to April 15, 2018.

Track and field athlete Elijah Manangoi was the country's flag bearer during the opening ceremony.

== Medalists ==
Medal	Name	Sport	Event	Date
Gold	Wycliffe Kinyamal	Athletics	Men's 800 m	April 12
Gold	Conseslus Kipruto	Athletics	Men's 3000 m Steeplechase	April 13
Gold	Hellen Obiri	Athletics	Women's 5000 m	April 14
Gold	Elijah Motonei Manangoi	Athletics	Men's 1500 m	April 14
Silver	Stacy Ndiwa	Athletics	Women's 10,000 m	April 9
Silver	Beatrice Chepkoech	Athletics	Women's 1500 m	April 10
Silver	Celliphine Chepteek Chespol	Athletics	Women's 3000 m Steeplechase	April 11
Silver	Abraham Kibiwott	Athletics	Men's 3000 m Steeplechase	April 13
Silver	Margaret Nyairera Wambui	Athletics	Women's 800 m	April 13
Silver	Margaret Chelimo Kipkemboi	Athletics	Women's 5000 m	April 14
Silver	Timothy Cheruiyot	Athletics	Men's 1500 m	April 14
Bronze	Samuel Ireri Gathimba	Athletics	Men's 20 kilometres walk	April 8
Bronze	Edward Zakayo	Athletics	Men's 3000 m Steeplechase	April 8
Bronze	Purity Cherotich Kirui	Athletics	Women's 3000 m Steeplechase	April 11
Bronze	Amos Kirui	Athletics	Men's 3000 m Steeplechase	April 13
Bronze	Rodgers Kwemoi	Athletics	Men's 10000 metres	April 13
Bronze	Christine Ongare	Boxing	Women's 51 kg	April 13

== Competitors ==
The following is the list of number of competitors participating at the Games per sport/discipline.

Sport	Men	Women	Total
Athletics	38	28	66
Badminton	1	1	2
Boxing	7	3	10
Cycling	4	0	4
Lawn bowls	1	1	2
Powerlifting	1	2	3
Rugby sevens	13	13	26
Shooting	3	2	5
Squash	1	1	2
Swimming	2	4	6
Table tennis	1	1	2
Triathlon	0	1	1
Weightlifting	3	2	5
Wrestling	1	1	1
Total	76	60	136

== Athletics ==
Men
Track & road events

Athlete	Event	Heat		Semifinal		Final	
Athlete	Event	Result	Rank	Result	Rank	Result	Rank
Mark Otieno Odhiambo	100 m	10.35	2 Q	10.37	6	did not advance	
Stephen Wesonga	100 m T47	—N/a				12.47	5
Peter Mwai Ndichu	200 m	21.27	5	Did not advance			
Mike Mokamba Nyang'au	200 m	21.14	3	Did not advance			
Mark Otieno Odhiambo	200 m	21.03	3 q	21.29	5	Did not advance	
Collins Omae Gichana	400 m	46.57	4 Q	47.39	8	did not advance	
Boniface Ontuga Mweresa	400 m	46.32	3 Q	46.68	6	did not advance	
Alexander Lerionka Sampao	400 m	DNS		did not advance			
Wycliffe Kinyamal	800 m	1:45.46	1 Q	—N/a		1:45.11	1st place, gold medalist(s)
Jonathan Kitilit	800 m	1:47.27	1 Q	—N/a		1:46.12	6
Cornelius Tuwei	800 m	1:47.10	3	—N/a		Did not advance	
Timothy Cheruiyot	1500 m	3:42.95	1 Q	—N/a		3:35.17	2nd place, silver medalist(s)
Elijah Motonei Manangoi	1500 m	3:46.82	1 Q	—N/a		3:34.78	1st place, gold medalist(s)
Kumari Taki	1500 m	3:43.93	3 Q	—N/a		3:38.74	7
David Kiprotich Bett	5000 m	—N/a				14:18:80	11
Nicholas Kipkorir Kimeli	5000 m	—N/a				14:13:97	9
Edward Pingua Zakayo	5000 m	—N/a				13:54:06	3rd place, bronze medalist(s)
Josphat Bett Kipkoech	10000 m	—N/a				28:56.22	10
Rodgers Kwemoi	10000 m	—N/a				27:28.66 SB	3rd place, bronze medalist(s)
Jonathan Muia Ndiku	10000 m	—N/a				27:56.24	8
Kiprono Koskei	110 m hurdles	15.00	8	—N/a		Did not advance	
Nicholas Kiplagat Bett	400 m hurdles	49.24	1 Q	—N/a		51.00	8
Aron Kipchumba Koech	400 m hurdles	49.28 SB	3 Q	—N/a		50.02	6
William Mbeva Mutunga	400 m hurdles	50.92	6	—N/a		Did not advance	
Abraham Kibiwott	3000 m steeplechase	—N/a				8:10.62 SB	2nd place, silver medalist(s)
Conseslus Kipruto	3000 m steeplechase	—N/a				8:10.08 GR	1st place, gold medalist(s)
Amos Kirui	3000 m steeplechase	—N/a				8:12.24	3rd place, bronze medalist(s)
Collins Omae Gichana; Kiprono Koskei; Peter Mwai Ndichu; Mike Mokamba Nyangau; Mark Otieno Odhiambo	4 × 100 m	DNS		—N/a		Did not advance	
Nicholas Kiplagat Bett; Collins Omae Gichana; Aron Kipchumba Koech; Boniface Ontuga Mweresa; Mike Mokamba Nyang'au*; Peter Mwai Ndichu*	4 × 400 m	3:13.52	2 Q	—N/a		DNS	
Nicholas Manza Kamakya	Marathon	—N/a				2:40:18	16
Julius Nderitu Karinga	Marathon	—N/a				2:24:26	9
Kenneth Mburu Mungara	Marathon	—N/a				2:25:42	10
Samuel Ireri Gathimba	20 km walk	—N/a				1:19:51	3rd place, bronze medalist(s)
Simon Wachira	20 km walk	—N/a				1:26:33	12

* Competed in the heats only.

Field events

Athlete	Event	Qualification		Final	
Athlete	Event	Distance	Rank	Distance	Rank
Bethwel Lagat	Long jump	7.58	10	Did not advance	
Elijah Kimitei	Triple jump	15.75	6	Did not advance	
Mathieu Kiplagat Sawe	High jump	2.15	16	Did not advance	
Alex Toroitich Kiprotich	Javelin throw	74.88	11 q	73.21	11
Julius Yego	Javelin throw	74.55	13	Did not advance	
Dominic Ondigi Abunda	Hammer throw	—N/a		61.38 NR	16

Combined events – Decathlon

Athlete	Event	100 m	LJ	SP	HJ	400 m	110H	DT	PV	JT	1500 m	Final	Rank
Gilbert Koech	Result	11.38	6.59	13.21 PB	1.83 PB	49.28	15.63 PB	40.80 PB	3.30 PB	58.27	4:31.82	7009 PB	8
Gilbert Koech	Points	778	718	680	653	848	775	681	431	712	733	7009 PB	8

Women
Track & road events

Athlete	Event	Heat		Semifinal		Final	
Athlete	Event	Result	Rank	Result	Rank	Result	Rank
Joan Cherono	200 m	25.10	7	did not advance			
Gladys Musyoka	200 m	24.94	6	did not advance			
Millicent Ndoro	200 m	24.31	5 q	24.42	8	did not advance	
Maximila Imali	400 m	51.74	1 Q	51.52	1 Q	51.32	5
Gladys Musyoka	400 m	53.41	6 q	54.40	7	did not advance	
Veronica Kamumbe Mutua	400 m	52.70	4 Q	54.85	8	did not advance	
Eglay Nalayanya	800 m	2:00.28	3 q	—N/a		2:03.08	8
Emily Cherotich Tuei	800 m	2:00.58	1 Q	—N/a		2:01.74	7
Margaret Nyairera Wambui	800 m	2:00.60	1 Q	—N/a		1:58.07	2nd place, silver medalist(s)
Winny Chebet	1500 m	4:20.67	9	—N/a		did not advance	
Beatrice Chepkoech	1500 m	4:08.28	1 Q	—N/a		4:03.09	2nd place, silver medalist(s)
Mary Wangari Kuria	1500 m	4:06.58	3 Q	—N/a		4:05.88	9
Eva Cherono	5000 m	—N/a				15:36.10	7
Margaret Chelimo Kipkemboi	5000 m	—N/a				15:15.28	2nd place, silver medalist(s)
Hellen Obiri	5000 m	—N/a				15:13.11	1st place, gold medalist(s)
Beatrice Mutai	10000 m	—N/a				31:49.81	4
Stacy Ndiwa	10000 m	—N/a				31:46.36	2nd place, silver medalist(s)
Sandrafelis Chebet Tuei	10000 m	—N/a				32:11.92	10
Priscilla Tabunda	100 m hurdles	14.18	7	—N/a		did not advance	
Maureen Jelagat Maiyo	400 m hurdles	57.66	6	—N/a		did not advance	
Fancy Cherono	3000 m steeplechase	—N/a				9:46.27	6
Celliphine Chepteek Chespol	3000 m steeplechase	—N/a				9:22.61	2nd place, silver medalist(s)
Purity Cherotich Kirui	3000 m steeplechase	—N/a				9:25.74	3rd place, bronze medalist(s)
Sheila Jerotich	Marathon	—N/a				2:36:19	4
Hellen Nzembi Musyoka	Marathon	—N/a				DNF	
Shelmith Muriuki Nyawira	Marathon	—N/a				2:47:53	10
Grace Wanjiru Njue	20 km walk	—N/a				1:42:23	8
Lindah Waweru	20 km walk	—N/a				1:53:41	11

Field events

Athlete	Event	Qualification		Final	
Athlete	Event	Distance	Rank	Distance	Rank
Priscilla Tabunda	Long jump	5.68	17	did not advance	
Lucy Omondi	Hammer throw	—N/a		45.59	9

== Badminton ==
Kenya participated with two athletes (one man and one woman)

Athlete	Event	Round of 64	Round of 32	Round of 16	Quarterfinal	Semifinal	Final / BM	
Athlete	Event	Opposition Score	Opposition Score	Opposition Score	Opposition Score	Opposition Score	Opposition Score	Rank
Victor Munga	Men's singles	Tob Adeoye (FAI); W 2-0	Dennis Coke (JAM); L 0-2	did not advance				
Mercy Joseph	Women's singles	Allisen Camille (SEY); L W/O	did not advance					
Mercy Joseph; Victor Munga	Mixed doubles	Dunn / O'Donnell (SCO); L W/O	did not advance					

== Boxing ==
Kenya participated with a team of 10 athletes (7 men and 3 women)

Men

Athlete	Event	Round of 32	Round of 16	Quarterfinals	Semifinals	Final	Rank
Athlete	Event	Opposition Result	Opposition Result	Opposition Result	Opposition Result	Opposition Result	Rank
Shaffi Hassan	−49 kg	—N/a	Mathias Hamunyela (NAM); W 3-2	Juma Miiro (UGA); L 2-3	did not advance		
Brian Agina	−52 kg	—N/a	Syed Muhammad Asif (PAK); L 1-4	did not advance			
Benson Njangiru	−56 kg	—N/a	Peter McGrail (ENG); L RSC	did not advance			
Nicholas Okoth	−60 kg	Michael Alexander (TTO); L 0–5	did not advance				
Edwin Owuor	−75 kg	Selemani Kidunda (TAN); L 2-3	Ryan Scaife (NZL); L 0-5	did not advance			
Nickson Abaka	−81 kg	—N/a	Mbachi Kaonga (ZAM); L 1–4	did not advance			
Elly Ochola	−91 kg	—N/a	Scott Forrest (SCO); L 0-5	did not advance			

Women

Athlete	Event	Round of 16	Quarterfinals	Semifinals	Final	Rank
Athlete	Event	Opposition Result	Opposition Result	Opposition Result	Opposition Result	Rank
Christine Ongare	−51 kg	—N/a	Dulani Jayasinghe (SRI); W RSC	Carly McNaul (NIR); L 0-5	Did not advance	3rd place, bronze medalist(s)
Lorna Simbi	−69 kg	Bye	Marie-Jeanne Parent (CAN); L 0–5	did not advance		
Elizabeth Andiego	−75 kg	Bye	Millicent Agboegbulem (NGR); L 0–5	did not advance		

== Cycling ==
Kenya participated with 4 athletes (4 men).

=== Road ===
Men

Athlete	Event	Time	Rank
Suleiman Kangangi	Road race	3:57:58	19
Salim Kipkemboi	Road race	3:59:39	39
David Kinjah	Road race	DNF	
Peter Waruiru	Road race	DNF	
David Kinjah	Time trial	54:35.62	28

== Lawn bowls ==
Kenya will compete in Lawn bowls.

Athlete	Event	Group Stage						Quarterfinal	Semifinal	Final / BM	
Athlete	Event	Opposition Score	Opposition Score	Opposition Score	Opposition Score	Opposition Score	Rank	Opposition Score	Opposition Score	Opposition Score	Rank
Cephas Kimani	Men's Singles	Xalxo (IND); L 12–21	Newell (JAM); W 21–2	McIlroy (NZL); L 10–21	Kumar (FIJ); L 5–21	Paxton (ENG); L 14–21	6	did not advance			
Eunice Mbugua	Women's Singles	Wimp (PNG); W 21–15	Anderson (NFI); L 7–21	Senna (BOT); W 21–10	McKerihen (CAN); L 10–21	Mataiho (COK); L 18–19	4	did not advance			

== Powerlifting ==
Kenya participated with 3 athletes (1 man and 2 women).

Athlete	Event	Result	Rank
Gabriel Wanjiku	Men's lightweight	143.8	7
Hellen Kariuki	Women's lightweight	96.0	4
Joyce Njuguna	Women's heavyweight	89.0	3

== Rugby sevens ==
=== Men's tournament ===
Kenya qualified a men's team of 12 athletes by being among the top nine ranked nations from the Commonwealth in the 2016–17 World Rugby Sevens Series ranking.

Roster

- Eden Agero
- Willie Ambaka
- Andrew Amonde
- Collins Injera
- Ian Minjire
- Billy Odhiambo
- Samuel Oliech
- Jeffrey Oluoch
- Oscar Ouma
- Arthur Owira
- Nelson Oyoo
- Daniel Sikuta

Pool C

Pos	Team	Pld	W	D	L	PF	PA	PD	Pts	Qualification
1	New Zealand	3	3	0	0	127	14	+113	9	Semi-finals
2	Kenya	3	2	0	1	80	50	+30	7	Classification semi-finals
3	Canada	3	1	0	2	64	59	+5	5	
4	Zambia	3	0	0	3	0	148	−148	3	

Source: GC2018
Rules for classification: 1) Points; 2) Head-to-head result; 3) Point difference; 4) Points scored.

14 April 2018
10:15

Canada	10–26	Kenya
Try: Hirayama 1' m Douglas 10' m Con: Hirayama (0/2)	(Gold Coast 2018)	Try: Injera 7' m Oluoch 8' c Oyoo 12' c Ambaka 13' c Con: Oliech (3/4) 8', 12', 13'; Cards: Ouma Achieng (yellow card) 5' to 7'

Robina Stadium, Gold Coast
Referee: Richard Kelly (New Zealand)

14 April 2018
14:17

New Zealand	40–7	Kenya
Try: Nanai-Seturo (2) 1' m, 6' c Molia 3' c Ware 8' c Curry 9' c Knewstubb 11' c Con: Koroi (2/3) 3', 6'; Baker (1/1) 8'; Knewstubb (2/2) 10', 11'	(Gold Coast 2018)	Try: Oliech 12' c Con: Oliech (1/1) 13'

Robina Stadium, Gold Coast
Referee: Sam Grove-White (Scotland)

14 April 2018
20:27

Kenya	47–0	Zambia
Try: Owira 2' m Oluoch (2) 3' c, 9' c Oyoo (2) 5' c, 11' c Odhiambo 7' c Injera 7' c Con: Agero (6/7) 3', 5', 7', 7', 9', 11'	(Gold Coast 2018)

Robina Stadium, Gold Coast
Referee: Tevita Rokovereni (Fiji)

Classification semi-finals

15 April 2018
10:15

Australia	33–5	Kenya
Try: O'Donnell (2) 4' c, 13' c Longbottom 7' m Myers 8' c Porch 10' c Con: Porch (4/5) 4', 8', 11', 14'	(Gold Coast 2018)	Try: Odhiambo 1' m Con: Agero (0/1)

Robina Stadium, Gold Coast
Referee: Tevita Rokovereni (Fiji)

Match for seventh place

15 April 2018
13:11

Kenya	24–28	Wales
Try: Ambaka (2) 1' c, 9' m Odhiambo (2) 7' c, 14'; Con: Agero (2/3) 2', 7'	(Gold Coast 2018)	Try: Williams (2) 1' c, 4' c Morgan 10' c Treharne 12' c Con: Davies (2/2) 1', 4'; O'Brien (2/2) 10', 12'

Robina Stadium, Gold Coast
Referee: Richard Haughton (England)

=== Women's tournament ===
Roster

- Linet Arasa
- Cynthia Atieno
- Sheilla Chajira
- Celestine Masinde
- Rachael Mbogo
- Janet Okelo
- Grace Okulu
- Judith Okumu
- Philadelphia Olando
- Michelle Omondi
- Stacey Otieno
- Doreen Remour

Pool A

Pos	Team	Pld	W	D	L	PF	PA	PD	Pts	Qualification
1	New Zealand	3	3	0	0	110	7	+103	9	Semi-finals
2	Canada	3	2	0	1	60	36	+24	7	Semi-finals
3	Kenya	3	1	0	2	31	79	−48	5	Classification semi-finals
4	South Africa	3	0	0	3	10	89	−79	3	Classification semi-finals

Source: GC2018
Rules for classification: 1) Points; 2) Head-to-head result; 3) Point difference; 4) Points scored.

13 April 2018
16:53

New Zealand	45–0	Kenya
Try: Woodman (3) 1' m, 8' c, 9' c Brazier 2' c Broughton 7' c Williams (2) 11' c, 14' m Con: Nathan-Wong (5/6) 3', 7', 8', 9', 11'; Willison (0/1)	(Gold Coast 2018)

Robina Stadium, Gold Coast
Referee: Rose LaBreche (Canada)

13 April 2018
19:11

Canada	24–12	Kenya
Try: Greenshields 1' m Darling 3' m Farella (2) 6' c, 8' c Con: Nicholas (2/4) 6', 8'	(Gold Goast 2018)	Try: Olando 5' c Okelo 12'; Con: Remour Nziwa (1/1) 5'

Robina Stadium, Gold Coast
Referee: Hollie Davidson (Scotland)

14 April 2018
12:27

South Africa	10–19	Kenya
Try: Simmers 8' m Jordaan 9' m Con: Jordaan (0/2)	(Gold Coast 2018)	Try: Okelo 2' c Masinde 7' c Olando 13' m Con: Okulu (2/3) 3', 7'

Robina Stadium, Gold Coast
Referee: Rebecca Mahoney (New Zealand)

Classification semi-finals

15 April 2018	Kenya	14–12	Wales	Gold Coast
9:53

Match for fifth place

15 April 2018	Fiji	40–5	Kenya	Gold Coast
12:49

== Shooting ==
Kenya participated with 5 athletes (3 men and 2 women).

Men

Athlete	Event	Qualification		Final	
Athlete	Event	Points	Rank	Points	Rank
Gurupreet Dhanjal	50 metre rifle 3 positions	1068	17	did not advance	
Gurupreet Dhanjal	50 metre rifle prone	600.6	26	did not advance	
Gurupreet Dhanjal	10 metre air rifle	587.1	18	did not advance	
Gulraaj Sehmi	50 metre rifle 3 positions	1132	13	did not advance	
Gulraaj Sehmi	50 metre rifle prone	612.2	9	did not advance	
Gulraaj Sehmi	10 metre air rifle	598.5	17	did not advance	

Women

Athlete	Event	Qualification		Final	
Athlete	Event	Points	Rank	Points	Rank
Marrianne Cherotich	10 metre air pistol	329	21	did not advance	
Linet Owiti	10 metre air pistol	350	19	did not advance	

Open

Athlete	Event	Day 1		Day 2		Day 3		Total	
Athlete	Event	Points	Rank	Points	Rank	Points	Rank	Overall	Rank
Christopher Saina	Queen's prize individual	101-11v	24	143-9v	26	142-10v	25	386-30v	25

== Squash ==
Kenya participated with 2 athletes (1 man and 1 woman).

Individual

Athlete	Event	Round of 64	Round of 32	Round of 16	Quarterfinals	Semifinals	Final	
Athlete	Event	Opposition Score	Opposition Score	Opposition Score	Opposition Score	Opposition Score	Opposition Score	Rank
Hardeep Reel	Men's singles	Othneil Bailey (SVG); L 2 – 3	did not advance					
Khaaliqa Nimji	Women's singles	Bye	Nikki Todd (CAN); L 0 – 3	did not advance				

Doubles

Athlete	Event	Group stage			Round of 16	Quarterfinals	Semifinals	Final	
Athlete	Event	Opposition Score	Opposition Score	Rank	Opposition Score	Opposition Score	Opposition Score	Opposition Score	Rank
Khaaliqa Nimji; Hardeep Reel	Mixed doubles	Evans / Creed (WAL); L 0 - 2	West / Stafford (CAY); L 0 - 2	3	did not advance				

== Swimming ==
Kenya participated with 6 athletes (2 men and 4 women).

Men

Athlete	Event	Heat		Semifinal		Final	
Athlete	Event	Time	Rank	Time	Rank	Time	Rank
Steven Maina	100 m freestyle	53.53	38	did not advance			
Steven Maina	100 m backstroke	1:01.65	22	did not advance			
Steven Maina	50 m butterfly	26.02	33	did not advance			
Issa Mohamed	50 m freestyle	23.80	29	did not advance			
Issa Mohamed	100 m freestyle	DNS		did not advance			
Issa Mohamed	50 m butterfly	25.77	30	did not advance			

Women

Athlete	Event	Heat		Semifinal		Final	
Athlete	Event	Time	Rank	Time	Rank	Time	Rank
Maria Brunlehner	50 m freestyle	26.70	16 Q	26.63	16	did not advance	
Emily Muteti	50 m freestyle	27.14	19	did not advance			
Ann Wacuka	50 m freestyle S8	56.63	7 Q	—N/a		56.72	7
Maria Brunlehner	100 m freestyle	57.75	17	did not advance			
Sylvia Brunlehner	50 m backstroke	30.72	22	did not advance			
Sylvia Brunlehner	100 m backstroke	1:06.64	23	did not advance			
Emily Muteti	50 m butterfly	28.46	15 Q	28.63	16	did not advance	

== Table tennis ==
Kenya participated with 2 athletes (1 man and 1 woman).

Singles

Athletes	Event	Group Stage			Round of 64	Round of 32	Round of 16	Quarterfinal	Semifinal	Final	Rank
Athletes	Event	Opposition Score	Opposition Score	Rank	Opposition Score	Opposition Score	Opposition Score	Opposition Score	Opposition Score	Opposition Score	Rank
Brian Mutua	Men's singles	Doughty (BAR); L 2 - 4	Rameez (PAK); L 0 - 4	3	did not advance						
Sejal Thakkar	Women's singles	Ho Wan Kau (MRI); L 0 - 4	Qwea (VAN); W 4 - 1	2	—N/a	did not advance					

Doubles

Athletes	Event	Round of 64	Round of 32	Round of 16	Quarterfinal	Semifinal	Final	Rank
Athletes	Event	Opposition Score	Opposition Score	Opposition Score	Opposition Score	Opposition Score	Opposition Score	Rank
Sejal Thakkar; Brian Mutua	Mixed doubles	Jayasingha Mudiyanselage / Warusawithana (SRI); L 2 - 3	did not advance					

== Triathlon ==
Kenya participated with 1 athlete (1 woman).

Individual

Athlete	Event	Swim (750 m)	Trans 1	Bike (20 km)	Trans 2	Run (5 km)	Total	Rank
Hanifa Said	Women's	14:28	0:45	36:15	0:46	23:04	1:15:18	23

== Weightlifting ==
Kenya participated with 5 athletes (3 men and 2 women).

Athlete	Event	Snatch		Clean & Jerk		Total	Rank
Athlete	Event	Result	Rank	Result	Rank	Total	Rank
Benjamin Ochoma	Men's −56 kg	62	12	76	12	138	12
Webstar Lukose	Men's −77 kg	127	10	155	11	282	10
James Adede	Men's −94 kg	120	13	151	10	271	11
Winny Langat	Women's −58 kg	60	14	75	14	135	14
Winnie Okoth	Women's −63 kg	66	12	87	10	133	11

== Wrestling ==
Kenya participated with 2 athletes (1 man and 1 woman).

Men

Athlete	Event	Round of 16	Quarterfinal	Semifinal	Repechage	Final / BM	
Athlete	Event	Opposition Result	Opposition Result	Opposition Result	Opposition Result	Opposition Result	Rank
Mark Inguyesi	-86 kg	Eslami (ENG); L 1 - 4	did not advance				11

Women

Athlete	Event	Group Stage			Semifinal	Final / BM	
Athlete	Event	Opposition Result	Opposition Result	Rank	Opposition Result	Opposition Result	Rank
Lilian Nthiga	-68 kg	Sultana (BAN); L 0 - 5	Orborududu (NGR); L 0 - 5	3	did not advance		6

== See also ==
- Kenya at the 2018 Summer Youth Olympics
