= 2019 Hong Kong Women's Sevens =

- Women's Sevens Series VII
- Host nation: Hong Kong
- Date: 4–5 April 2019

Cup
- Champion: Brazil
- Runner-up: Scotland

Tournament details
- Matches played: 25

The 2019 Hong Kong Women's Sevens acts as a qualifier for the 2019–20 World Rugby Women's Sevens Series. The tournament was played on 4 April 2019 with pool stage matches played at So Kon Po Recreation Ground with knock-out stage matches played at the Hong Kong Stadium in Hong Kong alongside the 2019 Hong Kong Sevens for men.

== Continental qualifying ==
Teams will qualify for the World Series Qualifier tournament based on continental championships. The top teams from each continent that are not already core teams will qualify.

Continental Sevens Championship	Dates	Venue(s)	Berths	Qualified
2018 Rugby Europe Women's Sevens Grand Prix Series	3 June– 16 July 2018	(France) Malemort, (Russia) Kazan	3	Scotland; Belgium; Poland
2018 Africa Women's Sevens	16–17 September 2018	(Botswana) Gaborone	2	Kenya; Uganda
2018 Asia Rugby Women's Sevens Series	23 September– 14 October 2018	Hong Kong, (South Korea) Incheon, (Sri Lanka) Colombo	3	Hong Kong; Kazakhstan; Japan
2018 Oceania Women's Sevens Championship	10–11 November 2018	(Fiji) Suva	1	Papua New Guinea
2018 Torneo Valentín Martinez (Sudamérica)	10–11 November 2018	(Uruguay) Montevideo	2	Brazil; Argentina
2018 RAN Women's Sevens	25–26; November 2018	(Barbados) Saint James	1	Mexico
Total			12	

== Format ==
12 teams, split into three groups of four. The group winners, runners up and the two best third ranked teams will enter the knockout stage. The overall winner will gain a spot on the 2019–20 World Rugby Women's Sevens Series.

== Pool Stage ==
All times in Hong Kong Time (UTC+08:00).

=== Pool A ===
Team	Pld	W	D	L	PF	PA	PD	Pts
Japan	3	3	0	0	116	19	+97	9
Scotland	3	2	0	1	88	44	+44	7
Belgium	3	1	0	2	46	66	–20	5
Mexico	3	0	0	3	5	126	–121	3

4 April 2019
10:00

Belgium	12–31	Scotland
Try: Nairac 7'c Blondiau 8'm Con: D'Haeseleir (1/2) 7'		Try: Smith (2) 0'm, 6'c Sergeant 3'c Lloyd (2) 10'c, 11'm Con: Nelson (3/5) 3', 7', 10'

So Kon Po Recreation Ground, Hong Kong
Referee: Emily Hsieh (United States)

4 April 2019
10:22

Japan	54–0	Mexico
Try: Nakamura (2) 1'c, 14'm Bogidraumainadave 3'c Okuroda 6'c Kurogi 7'c Tsutsumi 8'c Suzuki (2) 9'c, 11'c Con: Okuroda (7/8) 2', 4', 6', 7', 8', 10', 11'

So Kon Po Recreation Ground, Hong Kong
Referee: Maria Pacifico (Italy)

4 April 2019
12:34

Belgium	34–0	Mexico
Try: De Donder 5'm Lalli (2) 6'm, 8'm Nairac 12'c Pierson (2) 13'c, 14'm Con: D'Haeseleir (2/3) 12', 13'; Stévins (0/3)

So Kon Po Recreation Ground, Hong Kong
Referee: Shanda Mosher-Gallant (Canada)

4 April 2019
12:56

Japan	27–19	Scotland
Try: Hirano 4'm Bogidraumainadave 5'm Tsutsumi 9'm, 13'm Matsuda 11'c Con: Okuroda (1/5) 12'		Try: Smith 1'c Lloyd 8'c Evans 14'; Con: Nelson (2/2) 2', 9'

So Kon Po Recreation Ground, Hong Kong
Referee: Ashleigh Murray (South Africa)

4 April 2019
15:08

Scotland	38–5	Mexico
Try: Lloyd (3) 1'c, 5'c, 9'm Evans 3'm Gaffney 7'c Grieve 11'c Con: Nelson (2/3) 2', 5'; Sergeant (2/3) 8', 12'		Try: Salomon 7'm Con: Rodriguez (0/1)

So Kon Po Recreation Ground, Hong Kong
Referee: Emily Hsieh (United States)

4 April 2019
15:30

Japan	35–0	Belgium
Try: Bogidraumainadave 2'c Matsuda 4'c Suzuki (2) 8'c, 10'c Hirano 12'c Con: Okuroda (2/2) 2', 4'; Hirano (3/3) 9', 10', 13'

So Kon Po Recreation Ground, Hong Kong
Referee: Katherine Ritchie (England)

=== Pool B ===
Team	Pld	W	D	L	PF	PA	PD	Pts
Kenya	3	3	0	0	80	15	+65	9
Papua New Guinea	3	2	0	1	64	34	+30	7
Hong Kong	3	1	0	2	45	63	–18	5
Uganda	3	0	0	3	5	82	–77	3

4 April 2019
10:44

Papua New Guinea	22–14	Hong Kong
Try: Rama 1'm Lavai 3'c Lagona 5'm Biyama 7'm Con: Lavai (1/4) 3'		Try: Chong 9'c Kwong 12'c Con: S. Chan (2/2) 9', 12

So Kon Po Recreation Ground, Hong Kong
Referee: Ashleigh Murray (South Africa)

4 April 2019
11:06

Kenya	24–0	Uganda
Try: Olando 2'm Okelo 4'c Lindo 8'c Okulu 10'm Con: Okulu (2/4) 4', 8'

So Kon Po Recreation Ground, Hong Kong
Referee: Shanda Mosher-Gallant (Canada)

4 April 2019
13:18

Papua New Guinea	32–0	Uganda
Try: Lavai 0'm Lagona 5'm Rama 7'm Biyama 9'm Garesa 11'm Kaore 14'c Con: Lavai (1/1) 14'; Lagona (0/5)

So Kon Po Recreation Ground, Hong Kong
Referee: Maria Pacifico (Italy)

4 April 2019
13:40

Kenya	36–5	Hong Kong
Try: Okulu (2) 1'm, 13'c Awino (2) 3'm, 7'm Atieno 7'c Olando 9'c Con: Awuor Owino (1/4) 7'; Okulu (2/2) 10', 13'		Try: Lucas 6'm Con: S. Chan (0/1)

So Kon Po Recreation Ground, Hong Kong
Referee: Emily Hsieh (United States)

4 April 2019
15:52

Hong Kong	26–5	Uganda
Try: Chong 1'c Poon 3'm Penalty try 7'; Li 9'c Con: Poon (2/3) 1', 10'		Try: Lekuru 12'm Con: Mudoola (0/1)

So Kon Po Recreation Ground, Hong Kong
Referee: Shanda Mosher-Gallant (Canada)

4 April 2019
16:14

Kenya	20–10	Papua New Guinea
Try: Chajira 1'm Awino 5'm Okelo (2) 7'm, 12'm Con: Okulu (0/3); Awuor Owino (0/1)		Try: Lagona 2'm Kaore 7'm Con: Lavai (0/2)

So Kon Po Recreation Ground, Hong Kong
Referee: Ashleigh Murray (South Africa)

=== Pool C ===
Team	Pld	W	D	L	PF	PA	PD	Pts
Brazil	3	3	0	0	54	48	+6	9
Kazakhstan	3	1	0	2	39	38	+1	5
Argentina	3	1	0	2	60	62	–2	5
Poland	3	1	0	2	43	48	–5	5

4 April 2019
11:28

Argentina	12–17	Kazakhstan
Try: Gonzalez 6'c Moreno 9'm Con: Gonzalez (1/2) 7'		Try: Nurmatova 1'm Teryayeva 7'c Baktybayeva 14'm Con: Nurmatova (1/3) 8'

So Kon Po Recreation Ground, Hong Kong
Referee: Katherine Ritchie (England)

4 April 2019
11:50

Brazil	14–12	Poland
Try: B. Silva 3'c Costa 12'c Con: Kocchann (2/2) 4', 12'		Try: Paszczyk 6'c Pamięta 9'm Con: Jaszczyszyn (1/2) 7'

So Kon Po Recreation Ground, Hong Kong
Referee: Maria Pacifico (Italy)

4 April 2019
14:02

Argentina	24–19	Poland
Try: Gonzalez 1'm Montero 4'c Moreno 5'm Pedrozo 13'c Con: Gonzalez (2/4) 4', 13'		Try: Witkowska 7'c Paszczyk 8'c Klichowska 11'm Con: Jaszczyszyn (2/3) 7', 8'

So Kon Po Recreation Ground, Hong Kong
Referee: Katherine Ritchie (England)

4 April 2019
14:24

Brazil	14–12	Kazakhstan
Try: Zanellato 0'c B. Silva 10'c Con: Kocchann (2/2) 1', 10'		Try: Nurmatova 6'c Baktybayeva 14'; Con: Nurmatova (1/2) 6'

So Kon Po Recreation Ground, Hong Kong
Referee: Shanda Mosher-Gallant (Canada)

4 April 2019
16:36

Kazakhstan	10–12	Poland
Try: Yakovleva 10'm Bazyaruk 11'm Con: Nurmatova (0/2)		Try: Klichowska (2) 3'm, 13'c Con: Jaszczyszyn (1/2) 14'

So Kon Po Recreation Ground, Hong Kong
Referee: Maria Pacifico (Italy)

4 April 2019
16:58

Brazil	26–24	Argentina
Try: Zanellato (2) 1'm, 7'c Campos 4'c L. Silva 7'c Con: Kocchann (3/4) 5', 7', 8'		Try: Gonzalez 5'm Giraudo 9'c Montero 11'm Penalty try 14'; Con: Gonzalez (1/3) 9'

So Kon Po Recreation Ground, Hong Kong
Referee: Emily Hsieh (United States)

== Knockout stage ==
Quarter-finals
5 April 2019 – 10:00 – Hong Kong Stadium
Kenya	17
Argentina	15
5 April 2019 – 10:22 – Hong Kong Stadium
Brazil	21
Kazakhstan	5
5 April 2019 – 10:44 – Hong Kong Stadium
Scotland	36
Papua New Guinea	12
5 April 2019 – 11:06 – Hong Kong Stadium
Japan	27
Hong Kong	7

Semi-finals
5 April 2019 – 13:49 – Hong Kong Stadium
Kenya	5
Brazil	17
5 April 2019 – 14:11 – Hong Kong Stadium
Scotland	24
Japan	19

Final
5 April 2019 – 16:54 – Hong Kong Stadium
Brazil	28
Scotland	19

Matches

Quarter-finals

5 April 2019
10:00

Kenya	17–15	Argentina
Try: Okelo 7'm Okulu 10'c Atieno 12'm Con: Owino (1/3) 11'		Try: Padellaro 3'm Moreno 5'm Pedrozo 8'm Con: Gonzalez (0/3)

Hong Kong Stadium
Referee: Katherine Ritchie (England)

5 April 2019
10:22

Brazil	21–5	Kazakhstan
Try: Kocchann 3'c Scatrut 5'c L. Silva 7'c Con: Kocchann (3/3) 3', 5', 7'		Try: Yakovleva 14'm Con: Nurmatova (0/1)

Hong Kong Stadium
Referee: Ashleigh Murray (South Africa)

5 April 2019
10:44

Scotland	36–12	Papua New Guinea
Try: Lloyd 0'c Nelson 3'm Thomson 7'c Gaffney 7'c Rollie (2) 10'm, 11'm Con: Nelson (3/6) 0', 7', 8'		Try: Lagona 5'c Alois 13'm Con: Lagona (1/2) 6'

Hong Kong Stadium
Referee: Shanda Mosher-Gallant (Canada)

5 April 2019
11:06

Japan	27–7	Hong Kong
Try: Tsutsumi (2) 3'm, 5'm Hirano 7'm Kurogi 9'm Suzuki 12'c Con: Okuroda (1/5) 12'		Try: Chong 7'c Con: Poon (1/1) 8'

Hong Kong Stadium
Referee: Maria Pacifico (Italy)

Semi-finals

5 April 2019
13:49

Kenya	5–17	Brazil
Try: Okelo 4'm Con: Awino (0/1)		Try: B. Silva (2) 1'm, 6'm Campos 8'c Con: Kocchann (1/3) 9'

Hong Kong Stadium
Referee: Ashleigh Murray (South Africa)

5 April 2019
14:11

Scotland	24–19	Japan
Try: Gaffney 1'c Evans (2) 4'm, 8'c Rollie 10'c Con: Nelson (2/4) 8', 10'		Try: Bogidraumainadave 2'c, 7'm Suzuki 13'c Con: Okuroda (1/2) 3'; Hirano (1/1) 13'

Hong Kong Stadium
Referee: Emily Hsieh (United States)

World Series Qualifier Final

5 April 2019
16:54

Brazil	28–19	Scotland
Try: Furtado 2'c B. Silva 5'c Costa 8'c L. Silva 10'; Con: Kocchann (3/3) 3', 5', 9', 10'		Try: Thomson 0'm Evans 6'c Lloyd 7'c Con: Nelson (2/3) 6', 7'

Hong Kong Stadium
Referee: Emily Hsieh (United States)

== See also ==
- 2019 Hong Kong Sevens
- 2018-19 World Rugby Women's Sevens Series

Hong Kong Women's Sevens
Preceded by 2018 Hong Kong Women's Sevens	2019 Hong Kong Women's Sevens	Succeeded by 2020 Hong Kong Women's Sevens
