= 2019 Japan Women's Sevens =

- Women's Sevens Series VII
- Host nation: Japan
- Date: 20–21 April 2019

Cup
- Champion: Canada
- Runner-up: England
- Third: United States

Challenge Trophy
- Winner: Fiji

Tournament details
- Matches played: 34
- Tries scored: 212 (average 6.24 per match)
- Most points: Alev Kelter (53)
- Most tries: Anne-Cécile Ciofani (9)

The 2019 Japan Women's Sevens was the fourth tournament within the 2018–19 World Rugby Women's Sevens Series and the third edition of the Japan Women's Sevens. It was held over the weekend of 20–21 April 2019 at Mikuni World Stadium Kitakyushu.

== Format ==
The teams are drawn into three pools of four teams each. Each team plays every other team in their pool once. The top two teams from each pool advance to the Cup brackets while the top 2 third place teams also compete in the Cup/Plate. The other teams from each group play-off for the Challenge Trophy.

== Teams ==
Eleven core teams played in the tournament along with one invitational team, 2018 Asia Rugby Women's Sevens Series winner Japan:

- Australia
- Canada
- China
- England
- Fiji
- France
- Ireland
- Japan
- New Zealand
- Russia
- Spain
- United States

== Pool stage ==
All times in Japan Standard Time (UTC+09:00)

=== Pool A ===
Team	Pld	W	D	L	PF	PA	PD	Pts
France	3	3	0	0	95	36	+59	9
New Zealand	3	1	1	1	67	46	+21	6
Russia	3	1	1	1	55	71	–16	6
Japan	3	0	0	3	40	104	–64	3

20 April 2019
11:58

France	33–10	Russia
Try: Ciofani 1'c Bertrand (2) 3'c, 9'c Konde 12'; Okemba 14'c Con: Izar (3/3) 2', 4', 10'; Drouin (1/2) 14'	Report	Try: Zdrokova 5'm Khamidova 7'm Con: Lushina (0/2)

Mikuni World Stadium Kitakyushu
Referee: Tevita Rokovereni (Fiji)

20 April 2019
12:20

New Zealand	43–0	Japan
Try: Faleafaga (2) 1'c, 7'm Waaka (2) 2'm, 5'c Williams 9'c Baker 11'm Willison 14'c Con: Nathan-Wong (3/5) 1', 5', 9'; Willison (1/2) 14'	Report

Mikuni World Stadium Kitakyushu
Referee: Tyler Miller (Australia)

20 April 2019
14:42

New Zealand	17–17	Russia
Try: Baker 7'm Saili 10'm Nathan-Wong 14'c Con: Nathan-Wong (1/3) 14'	Report	Try: Baranchuk 6'm Khamidova 8'm Zdrokova 13'c Con: Lushina (1/3) 13'

Mikuni World Stadium Kitakyushu
Referee: Sara Cox (England)

20 April 2019
15:04

France	33–19	Japan
Try: Ciofani (2) 1'c, 7'c Bertrand 2'c Horta 10'm Okemba 14'c Con: Drouin (4/5) 2', 3', 7', 14'	Report	Try: Tsutsumi (2) 3'c, 9'm Ito 13'c Con: Okuroda (2/3) 4', 13'

Mikuni World Stadium Kitakyushu
Referee: Ashleigh Murray (South Africa)

20 April 2019
17:26

New Zealand	7–29	France
Try: Robins-Reti 9'c Con: Robins-Reti (1/1) 10'	Report	Try: Okemba 1'c Ciofani (2) 7'c, 7'm Izar 12'm Pelle 14'm Con: Drouin (2/3) 1', 7'; Izar (0/1); Konde (0/1)

Mikuni World Stadium Kitakyushu
Referee: Amy Perrett (Australia)

20 April 2019
17:48

Russia	28–21	Japan
Try: Khamidova (2) 2'c, 7'c Seredina 10'c Zdrokova 13'c Con: Lushina (1/1) 3'; Kukina (3/3) 8', 10', 14'	Report	Try: Hirano 4'c Matsuda (2) 7'c, 9'c Con: Okuroda (3/3) 5', 7', 9'

Mikuni World Stadium Kitakyushu
Referee: Lauren Jenner (New Zealand)

=== Pool B ===
Team	Pld	W	D	L	PF	PA	PD	Pts
Canada	3	3	0	0	85	50	+35	9
Australia	3	2	0	1	97	22	+75	7
Spain	3	1	0	2	53	88	–35	5
China	3	0	0	3	45	120	–75	3

20 April 2019
11:14

Canada	26–17	Spain
Try: Lukan 2'c Williams 7'c Benn 12'c Farella 14'm Con: Landry (3/4) 3', 7', 13'	Report	Try: Echebarría 5'm L. Erbina (2) 7'm, 10'c Con: García (1/3) 11'

Mikuni World Stadium Kitakyushu
Referee: Ashleigh Murray (South Africa)

20 April 2019
11:36

Australia	47–0	China
Try: Quirk 2'c Tonegato (3) 3'c, 8'c, 9'c Caslick 4'c Treherne 7'm Dick 13'c Con: Treherne (4/5) 2', 3', 5', 8'; Sykes (2/2) 10', 13'	Report

Mikuni World Stadium Kitakyushu
Referee: Sakurako Kawasaki (Japan)

20 April 2019
13:58

Canada	42–19	China
Try: Paquin 1'c Williams (2) 2'c, 8'c Wardley 4'c Farella (2) 11'c, 13'c Con: Landry (3/3) 1', 3', 4'; Nicholas (3/3) 9', 11', 13'	Report	Try: Chen (2) 6'c, 7'c Hu 14'm Con: Gu (2/2) 6', 7'; Yang (0/1)

Mikuni World Stadium Kitakyushu
Referee: Tyler Miller (Australia)

20 April 2019
14:20

Australia	36–5	Spain
Try: Green 1'm Caslick (2) 2'c, 10'm Pelite 5'm Dick 7'c Quirk 8'c Con: Sykes (3/6) 3', 7', 8'	Report	Try: Losada 12'm Con: García (0/1)

Mikuni World Stadium Kitakyushu
Referee: Lauren Jenner (New Zealand)

20 April 2019
16:42

Spain	31–26	China
Try: Losada 1'm Echebarría 7'c Bravo 8'c Algar 12'c Requena 13'm Con: García (1/2) 7'; Bravo (1/1) 8'; Algar (1/2) 12'	Report	Try: Min 3'm Yu 5'c Chen 10'c Ruan 14'c Con: Gu (2/3) 6', 14'; Chen (1/1) 10'

Mikuni World Stadium Kitakyushu
Referee: Madeline Putz (Australia)

20 April 2019
17:04

Australia	14–17	Canada
Try: Sykes (2) 5'c, 8'c Con: Sykes (2/2) 6', 8'	Report	Try: Farella 1'm Paquin 3'm Lukan 12'c Con: Landry (1/3) 12'

Mikuni World Stadium Kitakyushu
Referee: Tevita Rokovereni (Fiji)

=== Pool C ===
Team	Pld	W	D	L	PF	PA	PD	Pts
United States	3	3	0	0	89	24	+65	9
England	3	2	0	1	73	58	+15	7
Ireland	3	1	0	2	43	56	–13	5
Fiji	3	0	0	3	30	97	–67	3

20 April 2019
10:30

Ireland	31–10	Fiji
Try: Murphy-Crowe (3) 0'm, 7'c, 13'c Higgins 4'c Tyrell 10'm Con: Mulhall (3/5) 4', 7', 14'	Report	Try: Solikoviti 5'm Naimasi 8'm Con: Tisolo (0/2)

Mikuni World Stadium Kitakyushu
Referee: Sara Cox (England)

20 April 2019
10:52

United States	43–7	England
Try: Thomas 1'm Kelter (2) 3'm, 14'c Emba 7'c Fa'avesi 8'c Tapper (2) 10'c, 12'm Con: Kelter (4/7) 7', 8', 11', 14'	Report	Try: Rowland 2'c Con: Aitchison (1/1) 3'

Mikuni World Stadium Kitakyushu
Referee: Amy Perrett (Australia)

20 April 2019
13:14

Ireland	0–31	England
	Report	Try: Matthews 1'c Quansah 3'm Aitchison 7'c Uren 11'm Adam 14'c Con: Aitchison (2/4) 1', 14'; Rowland (1/1) 7'

Mikuni World Stadium Kitakyushu
Referee: Tevita Rokovereni (Fiji)

20 April 2019
13:36

United States	31–5	Fiji
Try: Thomas 1'm Kelter 2'c Fa'avesi 6'c Maher 9'c Heavirland 14'm Con: Kelter (3/4) 3', 6', 10'; Heavirland (0/1)	Report	Try: Savu 3'; Con: Tisolo (0/1)

Mikuni World Stadium Kitakyushu
Referee: Madeline Putz (Australia)

20 April 2019
15:58

Fiji	15–35	England
Try: Tisolo 0'm Daveua 7'm Savu 9'm Con: Tisolo (0/2); Seniyasi (0/1)	Report	Try: Uren 4'c Wilson-Hardy 6'c Jones 8'c Aitchison 12'c Quansah 13'c Con: Aitchison (4/4) 4', 6', 9', 12', 14'

Mikuni World Stadium Kitakyushu
Referee: Sakurako Kawasaki (Japan)

20 April 2019
16:20

United States	15–12	Ireland
Try: Canett 4'm Kirshe 8'; Kelter 11'; Con: Heavirland (0/2); Kelter (0/1)	Report	Try: Murphy-Crowe 2'c Lane 7'm Con: Mulhall (1/2) 2'

Mikuni World Stadium Kitakyushu
Referee: Sara Cox (England)

== Knockout stage ==
=== Challenge Trophy ===
Semi-finals
21 April 2019 – 11:58 – Mikuni World Stadium Kitakyushu
Spain	12
China	5
21 April 2019 – 12:20 – Mikuni World Stadium Kitakyushu
Japan	17
Fiji	28

Final
21 April 2019 – 15:26 – Mikuni World Stadium Kitakyushu
Spain	12
Fiji	41
Third place
21 April 2019 – 15:04 – Mikuni World Stadium Kitakyushu
China	7
Japan	0

Matches

Semifinals

21 April 2019
11:58

Spain	12–5	China
Try: Algar 5'm Martínez 7'c Con: García (1/2) 7'	Report	Try: Liu 9'm Con: Chen (0/1)

Mikuni World Stadium Kitakyushu
Referee: Sakurako Kawasaki (Japan)

21 April 2019
12:20

Japan	17–28	Fiji
Try: Tsutsumi 2'm Hirano 7'c Ito 14'm Con: Okuroda (1/3)	Report	Try: Naimasi (2) 4'c, 7'c Sokoiwasa 8'c Roqica 10'c Con: Tisolo (4/4) 4', 8', 9', 10'

Mikuni World Stadium Kitakyushu
Referee: Tyler Miller (Australia)

Eleventh Place

21 April 2019
15:04

China	7–0	Japan
Try: Gu 4'c Con: Gu (1/1) 5'	Report

Mikuni World Stadium Kitakyushu
Referee: Lauren Jenner (New Zealand)

Final

21 April 2019
15:26

Spain	12–41	Fiji
Try: Algar 4'c Fresneda 7'm Con: García (1/2) 4'	Report	Try: Savu (3) 0'c, 8'm, 10'm Naimasi 3'm Daveua (2) 6'c, 13'c Korowaqa 12'm Con: Tisolo (2/5) 1', 6'; Rokounono (1/2) 14'

Mikuni World Stadium Kitakyushu
Referee: Madeline Putz (Australia)

=== 5th place ===
Semi-finals
21 April 2019 – 13:36 – Mikuni World Stadium Kitakyushu
Russia	0
New Zealand	36
21 April 2019 – 13:58 – Mikuni World Stadium Kitakyushu
Australia	29
Ireland	7

Final
21 April 2019 – 16:42 – Mikuni World Stadium Kitakyushu
New Zealand	34
Australia	26
Seventh Place
21 April 2019 – 16:20 – Mikuni World Stadium Kitakyushu
Russia	14
Ireland	15

Matches

Semifinals

21 April 2019
13:36

Russia	0–36	New Zealand
	Report	Try: Tui 3'm Nathan-Wong 6'm Baker 8'c Hirini (2) 10'c, 14'c Faleafaga 12'm Con: Nathan-Wong (3/6) 8', 11', 14'

Mikuni World Stadium Kitakyushu
Referee: Madeline Putz (Australia)

21 April 2019
13:58

Australia	29–7	Ireland
Try: Sykes 3'm Tonegato (2) 7'c, 10'm Caslick 12'c Paki 14'm Con: Sykes (2/5) 7', 12'	Report	Try: Murphy-Crowe 4'c Con: Mulhall (1/1) 5'

Mikuni World Stadium Kitakyushu
Referee: Lauren Jenner (New Zealand)

Seventh Place

21 April 2019
16:20

Russia	14–15	Ireland
Try: Khamidova 4'c Shestakova 7'c Con: Lushina (2/2) 5', 7'	Report	Try: Higgins (2) 3'm, 9'm Galvin 9'm Con: Higgins (0/3)

Mikuni World Stadium Kitakyushu
Referee: Sakurako Kawasaki (Japan)

Final

21 April 2019
16:42

New Zealand	34–26	Australia
Try: Hirini (2) 0'c, 5'c Faleafaga 2'm Saili 3'm Tui 7'm Nathan-Wong 8'm Con: Nathan-Wong (2/6) 1', 6'	Report	Try: Murphy 9'c Green 12'c Sykes 13'm Con: Treherne (2/2) 10', 12'; Sykes (1/2) 13'

Mikuni World Stadium Kitakyushu
Referee: Sara Cox (England)

=== Cup ===
Quarter-finals
21 April 2019 – 10:30 – Mikuni World Stadium Kitakyushu
Canada	17
Russia	14
21 April 2019 – 10:52 – Mikuni World Stadium Kitakyushu
United States	26
New Zealand	19
21 April 2019 – 11:14 – Mikuni World Stadium Kitakyushu
Australia	7
England	21
21 April 2019 – 11:36 – Mikuni World Stadium Kitakyushu
France	19
Ireland	0

Semi-finals
21 April 2019 – 14:20 – Mikuni World Stadium Kitakyushu
Canada	24
United States	12
21 April 2019 – 14:42 – Mikuni World Stadium Kitakyushu
England	19
France	17

Final
21 April 2019 – 17:30 – Mikuni World Stadium Kitakyushu
Canada	7
England	5
Third place
21 April 2019 – 17:04 – Mikuni World Stadium Kitakyushu
United States	36
France	12

Matches

Quarterfinals

21 April 2019
10:30

Canada	17–14	Russia
Try: Landry 1'm Williams 5'm Paquin 7'c Con: Landry (1/3) 7'	Report	Try: Khamidova 9'c Zdrokova 11'c Con: Lushina (2/2) 9', 11'

Mikuni World Stadium Kitakyushu
Referee: Sara Cox

21 April 2019
10:52

United States	26–19	New Zealand
Try: Tapper 2'c Thomas 7'm Kelter 7'c Kirshe 13'c Con: Kelter (3/4) 3', 8', 13'	Report	Try: Faleafaga 4'm Williams (2) 9'c, 11'c Con: Nathan-Wong (2/3) 10', 12'

Mikuni World Stadium Kitakyushu
Referee: Tevita Rokovereni (Fiji)

21 April 2019
11:14

Australia	7–21	England
Try: Tonegato 14'c Con: Sykes	Report	Try: Matthews 2'c Rowland 8'c Aitchison 11'c Con: Aitchison (3/3) 2', 9', 11'

Mikuni World Stadium Kitakyushu
Referee: Ashleigh Murray (South Africa)

21 April 2019
11:36

France	19–0	Ireland
Try: Ciofani 7'c Okemba 7'c Pelle 10'm Con: Izar (2/3) 7', 7'	Report

Mikuni World Stadium Kitakyushu
Referee: Amy Perrett (Australia)

Semifinals

21 April 2019
14:20

Canada	24–12	United States
Try: Farella (2) 3'c, 8'm Greenshields 4'c Landry 10'm Con: Landry (2/4) 3', 4'	Report	Try: Doyle (2) 7'c, 14'c Con: Kelter (1/1) 7'; Emba (0/1)

Mikuni World Stadium Kitakyushu
Referee: Ashleigh Murray (South Africa)

21 April 2019
14:42

England	19–17	France
Try: Brown (2) 5'c, 10'c Uren 7'm Con: Aitchison (2/3) 5', 11'	Report	Try: Okemba 1'm Ciofani (2) 6', 9'; Con: Izar (1/3) 6'

Mikuni World Stadium Kitakyushu
Referee: Tevita Rokovereni (Fiji)

Third Place

21 April 2019
17:04

United States	36–12	France
Try: Maher 4'c Doyle (2) 6'm, 12'm Tapper (2) 7'c, 10'c Kirshe 9'm Con: Kelter (3/6) 4', 7', 11'	Report	Try: Neissen 1'm Ciofani 3'c Con: Izar (1/2) 3'

Mikuni World Stadium Kitakyushu
Referee: Tyler Miller (Australia)

Final

21 April 2019
17:30

Canada	7–5	England
Try: Landry 14'c Con: Landry (1/1) 14'	Report	Try: Wilson-Hardy 5'm Con: Aitchison (0/1)

Mikuni World Stadium Kitakyushu
Referee: Amy Perrett (Australia)

== Tournament placings ==
Place	Team	Points
1st place, gold medalist(s)	Canada	20
2nd place, silver medalist(s)	England	18
3rd place, bronze medalist(s)	United States	16
4	France	14
5	New Zealand	12
6	Australia	10

Place	Team	Points
7	Ireland	8
8	Russia	6
9	Fiji	4
10	Spain	3
11	China	2
12	Japan	1

Source: World Rugby

== Players ==
=== Scoring leaders ===
Tries scored
Rank	Player	Tries
1	Anne-Cécile Ciofani	9
2	Baizat Khamidova	6
2	Bianca Farella	6
2	Emma Tonegato	6
5	7 players	5

Points scored
Rank	Player	Points
1	Alev Kelter	53
2	Anne-Cécile Ciofani	45
3	Emma Sykes	42
4	Holly Aitchison	41
5	Ghislaine Landry	37
5	Tyla Nathan-Wong	37

Source: World Rugby

== See also ==
- World Rugby Women's Sevens Series
- 2018–19 World Rugby Women's Sevens Series

World Sevens Series VII
Preceded by 2019 Sydney Women's Sevens	2019 Japan Women's Sevens	Succeeded by 2019 Canada Women's Sevens
Japan Women's Sevens
Preceded by 2018 Japan Women's Sevens	2019 Japan Women's Sevens	Succeeded by 2020 Japan Women's Sevens
