= Ciofani =

Ciofani is a surname. Notable people with the surname include:

- Anne-Cécile Ciofani (born 1993), French rugby player
- Daniel Ciofani (born 1985), Italian footballer
- Gianni Ciofani (born 1982), Italian scientist
- Matteo Ciofani (born 1988), Italian footballer, brother of Daniel
- Walter Ciofani (born 1962), French hammer thrower
