= Atieno =

Atieno is a given name and a surname. Notable people with the name include:

== Middle name ==
- Eisha Stephen Atieno Odhiambo (1945–2009), Kenyan academic
- Gladys Atieno Nyasuna Wanga (born 1981), Kenyan politician
- Margaret Atieno Ogola (1958–2011), Kenyan Catholic Novelist

== Surname ==
- Anthony Wambani Atieno (born 1999), Kenyan professional footballer
- Camilla Atieno (born 1995), Kenyan rugby sevens player
- Neddy Atieno (born 1992), Kenyan former footballer
- Taiwo Atieno (born 1985), former professional footballer
