= Athletics at the 2018 Commonwealth Games =

- Dates: 8–15 April 2018
- Host city: Gold Coast, Queensland
- Venue: Carrara Stadium
- Events: 50
- Participation: 952 athletes from 68 nations
- Records set: games records

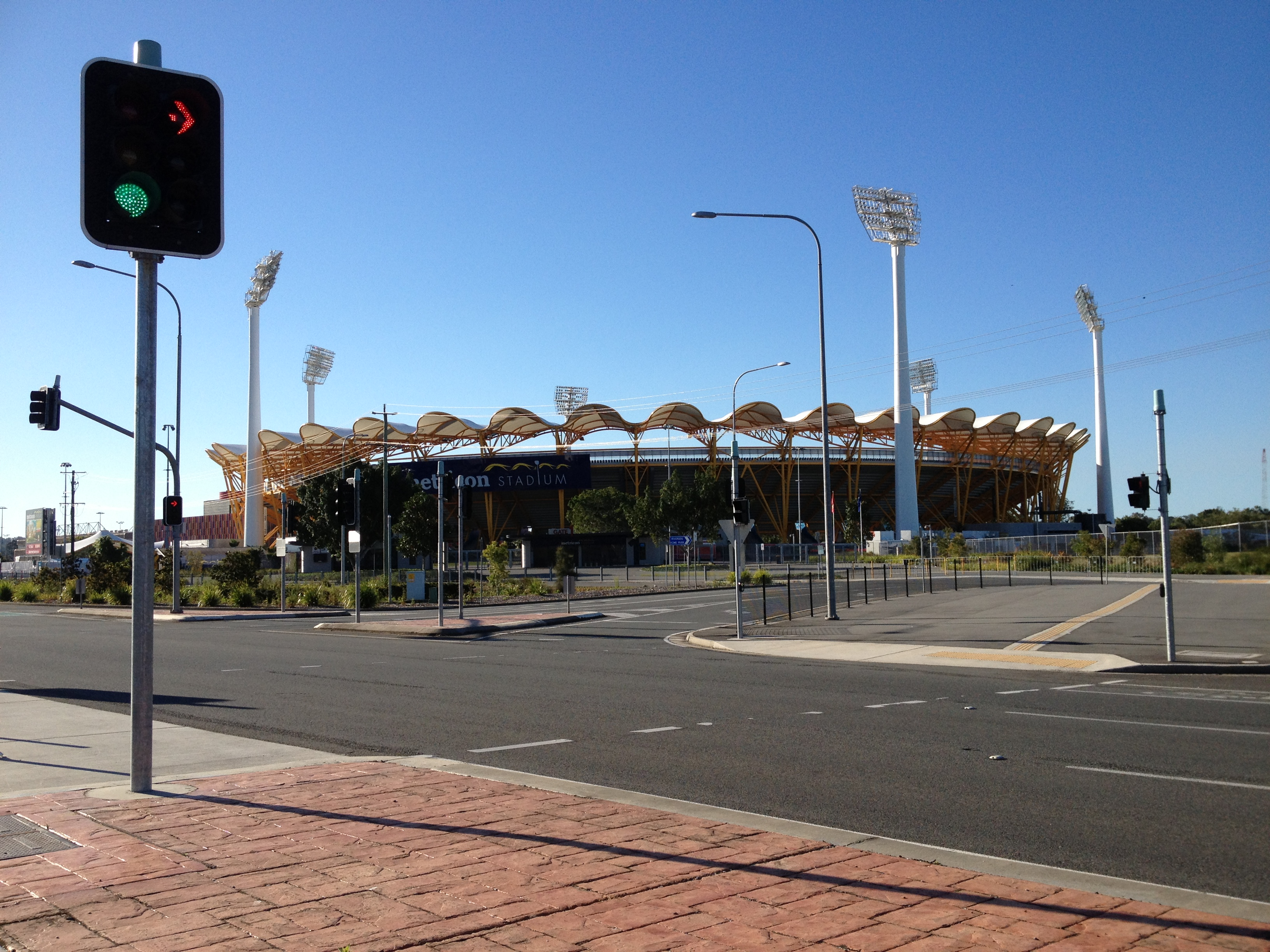
Carrara Stadium

Athletics was one of ten core sports that appeared at the 2018 Commonwealth Games in Gold Coast. As a founding sport, athletics has appeared consistently since its introduction at the 1911 Inter-Empire Games; the recognized precursor to the Commonwealth Games. The competition took place between Sunday 8–15 April 2018 at the Carrara Stadium.

The programme featured an expanded event set for para-athletes with a total of six men's and six women's events, re presenting doubling of the number para-events at the previous games. This move was approved of by the para-athletes, and Kailyn Joseph noted that inclusion in the medal table alongside able-bodied events allowed her to share in the same environment, as opposed to the separation found in the Paralympics and World Para Athletics Championships.

Two Indian athletes, racewalker Irfan Kolothum Thodi and triple jumper A.V. Rakesh Babu were removed from the games after a needle was found in their apartment, breaking games policy. A Singapore para-athlete, Mohammad Khairi Ishak, was withdrawn from the men's T47 100 m after failing a drug test prior to the competition. Other controversies of the athletics included the gold medal disqualification of Zharnel Hughes in the men's 200 m, after he impeded (eventual gold medallist) Jereem Richards, and the mid-race collapse of men's marathon leader Callum Hawkins.

== Preparation ==
In preparation for hosting the Commonwealth Games Athletics events, the modified Carrara Stadium was used for the Australian Athletics Championships in February 2018.

The Australian Sports Anti-Doping Authority conducted a series of anti-doping tests in the months before the games. Australian sprinter Jessica Peris (daughter of former Commonwealth Games sprint champion Nova Peris) was among those to a fail doping test and she withdrew from the Australian trials event.

== Schedule ==
Over the 10 days of competition there were 58 medal events including additional para-sport disciplines.

Q	Qualification	H	Heats	S	Semi-final	F	Final

Sex	Event	April												
Sex	Event	Sun 8		Mon 9		Tue10		Wed 11	Thu 12		Fri 13		Sat 14	Sun 15
Sex	Event	M	A	M	A	M	A	A	M	A	M	A	A	M
Men	100 m		H/S		F									
Men	100 m (T12)								H	F				
Men	100 m (T38)				F									
Men	100 m (T47)											F		
Men	200 m					H		S		F				
Men	400 m		H		S		F							
Men	800 m					H		S		F				
Men	1500 m										H		F	
Men	1500 m (T54)			H			F							
Men	5000 m		F											
Men	10,000 m											F		
Men	Marathon													F
Men	Marathon (T54)													F
Men	3000 m steeplechase											F		
Men	110 m hurdles			H			F							
Men	400 m hurdles					H				F				
Men	Decathlon			F										
Men	High jump			Q				F						
Men	Pole vault									F				
Men	Long jump					Q		F						
Men	Triple jump								Q				F	
Men	Shot put		Q		F									
Men	Shot put (F38)							F						
Men	Discus throw								Q			F		
Men	Hammer throw		F											
Men	Javelin throw										Q		F	
Men	20 km walk	F												
Men	4 × 100 m relay										H		F	
Men	4 × 400 m relay										H		F	
Women	100 m		H/S		F									
Women	100 m (T35)							F						
Women	100 m (T38)									F				
Women	200 m					H		S		F				
Women	400 m			H			S	F						
Women	800 m								H			F		
Women	1500 m				H		F							
Women	1500 m (T54)				H		F							
Women	5000 m												F	
Women	10,000 m				F									
Women	Marathon													F
Women	Marathon (T54)													F
Women	3000 m steeplechase							F						
Women	100 m hurdles								H			F		
Women	400 m hurdles					H				F				
Women	Heptathlon								F					
Women	High jump												F	
Women	Pole vault											F		
Women	Long jump							Q		F				
Women	Long jump (T38)		F											
Women	Triple jump						F							
Women	Shot put								Q			F		
Women	Discus throw									F				
Women	Hammer throw						F							
Women	Javelin throw							F						
Women	Javelin throw (F46)				F									
Women	20 km walk	F												
Women	4 × 100 m relay										H		F	
Women	4 × 400 m relay										H		F	

== Medal summary ==
=== Medal table ===
* Host nation (Australia)

Rank	Nation	Gold	Silver	Bronze	Total
1	Australia*	13	13	10	36
2	Jamaica	7	8	10	25
3	England	5	5	7	17
4	South Africa	5	4	5	14
5	Kenya	4	7	4	15
6	Canada	3	6	4	13
7	Uganda	3	1	2	6
8	Botswana	3	1	1	5
9	New Zealand	2	4	0	6
10	Nigeria	2	2	1	5
11	Wales	2	0	3	5
12	Trinidad and Tobago	2	0	0	2
13	Bahamas	1	3	0	4
14	India	1	1	1	3
15	Grenada	1	0	1	2
16	British Virgin Islands	1	0	0	1
16	Guyana	1	0	0	1
16	Namibia	1	0	0	1
16	Saint Lucia	1	0	0	1
20	Scotland	0	2	3	5
21	Dominica	0	1	1	2
22	Cameroon	0	0	1	1
22	Cyprus	0	0	1	1
22	Malaysia	0	0	1	1
22	Northern Ireland	0	0	1	1
22	Vanuatu	0	0	1	1
Totals (26 entries)		58	58	58	174

=== Men ===
Event	Gold		Silver		Bronze	
100 metres	Akani Simbine; South Africa	10.03	Henricho Bruintjies; South Africa	10.17	Yohan Blake; Jamaica	10.19
200 metres	Jereem Richards; Trinidad and Tobago	20.12	Aaron Brown; Canada	20.34	Leon Reid; Northern Ireland	20.55
400 metres	Isaac Makwala; Botswana	44.35	Baboloki Thebe; Botswana	45.09	Javon Francis; Jamaica	45.11 SB
800 metres	Wycliffe Kinyamal; Kenya	1:45.11	Kyle Langford; England	1:45.16 PB	Luke Mathews; Australia	1:45.60 SB
1500 metres	Elijah Manangoi; Kenya	3:34.78	Timothy Cheruiyot; Kenya	3:35.17	Jake Wightman; Scotland	3:35.97
5000 metres	Joshua Cheptegei; Uganda	13:50.83	Mohammed Ahmed; Canada	13:52.78	Edward Zakayo; Kenya	13:54.06
10,000 metres	Joshua Cheptegei; Uganda	27:19.62 GR	Mohammed Ahmed; Canada	27:20.56	Jacob Kiplimo; Uganda	27:30.25 SB
110 metres hurdles	Ronald Levy; Jamaica	13.19	Hansle Parchment; Jamaica	13.22	Nicholas Hough; Australia	13.38 PB
400 metres hurdles	Kyron McMaster; British Virgin Islands	48.25	Jeffrey Gibson; Bahamas	49.10 SB	Jaheel Hyde; Jamaica	49.16
3000 metres steeplechase	Conseslus Kipruto; Kenya	8:10.08 GR	Abraham Kibiwott; Kenya	8:10.62 =SB	Amos Kirui; Kenya	8:12.24
4 × 100 metres relay	England; Reuben Arthur; Zharnel Hughes; Richard Kilty; Harry Aikines-Aryeetey	38.13 SB	South Africa; Henricho Bruintjies; Emile Erasmus; Anaso Jobodwana; Akani Simbine	38.24 NR	Jamaica; Everton Clarke; Oshane Bailey; Warren Weir; Yohan Blake; Nigel Ellis*	38.35 SB
4 × 400 metres relay	Botswana; Leaname Maotoanong; Baboloki Thebe; Onkabetse Nkobolo; Isaac Makwala	3:01.78 SB	Bahamas; O'Jay Ferguson; Teray Smith; Stephen Newbold; Alonzo Russell; Michael Mathieu*; Ramon Miller*	3:01.92 SB	Jamaica; Jermaine Gayle; Demish Gaye; Jamari Rose; Javon Francis; Peter Matthews*	3:01.97 SB
Marathon	Michael Shelley; Australia	2:16:46	Solomon Mutai; Uganda	2:19:02	Robbie Simpson; Scotland	2:19:36
20 kilometres walk	Dane Bird-Smith; Australia	1:19:34 GR	Tom Bosworth; England	1:19:38 NR	Samuel Gathimba; Kenya	1:19:51
High jump	Brandon Starc; Australia	2.32 m PB	Jamal Wilson; Bahamas	2.30 m SB	Django Lovett; Canada	2.30 m PB
Pole vault	Kurtis Marschall; Australia	5.70 m	Shawnacy Barber; Canada	5.65 m	Luke Cutts; England	5.45 m
Long jump	Luvo Manyonga; South Africa	8.41 m GR	Henry Frayne; Australia	8.33 m	Ruswahl Samaai; South Africa	8.22 m
Triple jump	Troy Doris; Guyana	16.88 m SB	Yordanys Durañona; Dominica	16.86 m	Marcel Mayack; Cameroon	16.80 m PB
Shot put	Tom Walsh; New Zealand	21.41 m	Chukwuebuka Enekwechi; Nigeria	21.14 m PB	Tim Nedow; Canada	20.91 m SB
Discus throw	Fedrick Dacres; Jamaica	68.20 m GR	Traves Smikle; Jamaica	63.98 m	Apostolos Parellis; Cyprus	63.61 m
Hammer throw	Nick Miller; England	80.26 m GR NR	Matthew Denny; Australia	74.88 m PB	Mark Dry; Scotland	73.12 m SB
Javelin throw	Neeraj Chopra; India	86.47 m SB	Hamish Peacock; Australia	82.59 m	Anderson Peters; Grenada	82.20 m
Decathlon	Lindon Victor; Grenada	8303 pts	Pierce LePage; Canada	8171 pts PB	Cedric Dubler; Australia	7983 pts

* Indicates the athlete only competed in the preliminary heats and received medals.

==== Men's para-sport ====
Event	Gold		Silver		Bronze	
100 metres (T12)	Jonathan Ntutu (T12); South Africa	11.02	Hilton Langenhoven (T12); South Africa	11.27 =SB	Afiq Ali Hanafiah (T12); Malaysia	11.28
100 metres (T38)	Evan O'Hanlon (T38); Australia	11.09	Dyan Buis (T38); South Africa	11.33 SB	Charl du Toit (T37); South Africa	11.35 WR
100 metres (T47)	Suwaibidu Galadima (T47); Nigeria	11.04	James Arnott (T46); England	11.30	Tevaughn Thomas (T46); Jamaica	11.63
1500 metres (T54)	Alex Dupont (T54); Canada	3:11.75	Kurt Fearnley (T54); Australia	3:11.92	Jake Lappin (T54); Australia	3:12.60
Marathon (T54)	Kurt Fearnley (T54); Australia	1:30:26 GR	Johnboy Smith (T54); England	1:31:44 SB	Simon Lawson (T53); England	1:31:44
Shot put (F38)	Cameron Crombie (F38); Australia	15.74 m	Martin Jackson (F38); Australia	13.74 m SB	Reinhardt Hamman (F38); South Africa	13.15 m SB

=== Women ===
Event	Gold		Silver		Bronze	
100 metres	Michelle-Lee Ahye; Trinidad and Tobago	11.14	Christania Williams; Jamaica	11.21	Gayon Evans; Jamaica	11.22 PB
200 metres	Shaunae Miller-Uibo; Bahamas	22.09 GR	Shericka Jackson; Jamaica	22.18 PB	Dina Asher-Smith; England	22.29
400 metres	Amantle Montsho; Botswana	50.15 SB	Anastasia Le-Roy; Jamaica	50.57 PB	Stephenie Ann McPherson; Jamaica	50.93
800 metres	Caster Semenya; South Africa	1:56.68 GR	Margaret Wambui; Kenya	1:58.07	Natoya Goule; Jamaica	1:58.82 PB
1500 metres	Caster Semenya; South Africa	4:00.71 GR NR	Beatrice Chepkoech; Kenya	4:03.09 PB	Melissa Courtney; Wales	4:03.44 PB
5000 metres	Hellen Obiri; Kenya	15:13.11	Margaret Chelimo Kipkemboi; Kenya	15:15.28	Laura Weightman; England	15:25.84
10,000 metres	Stella Chesang; Uganda	31:45.30	Stacey Chepkemboi Ndiwa; Kenya	31:46.36 PB	Mercyline Chelangat; Uganda	31:48.41
100 metres hurdles	Oluwatobiloba Amusan; Nigeria	12.68	Danielle Williams; Jamaica	12.78	Yanique Thompson; Jamaica	12.97
400 metres hurdles	Janieve Russell; Jamaica	54.33	Eilidh Doyle; Scotland	54.80	Wenda Nel; South Africa	54.96
3000 metres steeplechase	Aisha Praught-Leer; Jamaica	9:21.00	Celliphine Chespol; Kenya	9:22.61	Purity Cherotich Kirui; Kenya	9:25.74
4 × 100 metres relay	England; Asha Philip; Dina Asher-Smith; Bianca Williams; Lorraine Ugen	42.46 NR	Jamaica; Christania Williams; Natasha Morrison; Gayon Evans; Elaine Thompson	42.52	Nigeria; Joy Udo-Gabriel; Blessing Okagbare-Ighoteguonor; Oluwatobiloba Amusan; Rosemary Chukwuma	42.75
4 × 400 metres relay	Jamaica; Christine Day; Anastasia Le-Roy; Janieve Russell; Stephenie Ann McPherson	3:24.00	Nigeria; Patience Okon George; Glory Onome Nathaniel; Praise Idamadudu; Yinka Ajayi	3:25.29	Botswana; Galefele Moroko; Christine Botlogetswe; Loungo Matlhaku; Amantle Montsho	3:26.86 NR
Marathon	Helalia Johannes; Namibia	2:32:40	Lisa Jane Weightman; Australia	2:33:23	Jessica Trengove; Australia	2:34:09
20 kilometres walk	Jemima Montag; Australia	1:32:50	Alana Barber; New Zealand	1:34:18	Bethan Davies; Wales	1:36:08
High jump	Levern Spencer; Saint Lucia	1.95 m SB	Morgan Lake; England	1.93 m	Nicola McDermott; Australia	1.91 m PB
Pole vault	Alysha Newman; Canada	4.75 m GR =NR	Eliza McCartney; New Zealand	4.70 m	Nina Kennedy; Australia	4.60 m
Long jump	Christabel Nettey; Canada	6.84 m	Brooke Stratton; Australia	6.77 m	Shara Proctor; England	6.75 m
Triple jump	Kimberly Williams; Jamaica	14.64 m PB	Shanieka Ricketts; Jamaica	14.52 m SB	Thea LaFond; Dominica	13.92 m
Shot put	Danniel Thomas-Dodd; Jamaica	19.36 m NR	Valerie Adams; New Zealand	18.70 m SB	Brittany Crew; Canada	18.32 m
Discus throw	Dani Stevens; Australia	68.26 m GR	Seema Punia; India	60.41 m	Navjeet Dhillon; India	57.43 m
Hammer throw	Julia Ratcliffe; New Zealand	69.94 m	Alexandra Hulley; Australia	68.20 m	Lara Nielsen; Australia	65.03 m
Javelin throw	Kathryn Mitchell; Australia	68.92 m GR AR	Kelsey-Lee Roberts; Australia	63.89 m	Sunette Viljoen; South Africa	62.08 m
Heptathlon	Katarina Johnson-Thompson; England	6255 pts	Nina Schultz; Canada	6133 pts PB	Niamh Emerson; England	6043 pts PB

==== Women's para-sport ====
Event	Gold		Silver		Bronze	
100 metres (T35)	Isis Holt (T35); Australia	13.58	Maria Lyle (T35); Scotland	15.14	Brianna Coop (T35); Australia	15.63
100 metres (T38)	Sophie Hahn (T38); England	12.46 GR	Rhiannon Clarke (T38); Australia	13.17 AR	Olivia Breen (T38); Wales	13.35
1500 metres (T54)	Madison de Rozario (T53); Australia	3:34.06	Angie Ballard (T53); Australia	3:36.85	Diane Roy (T54); Canada	3:36.97 GR
Marathon (T54)	Madison de Rozario (T53); Australia	1:44:00	Eliza Ault-Connell (T54); Australia	1:44:13	Jade Jones (T54); England	1:44:20
Long jump (T38)	Olivia Breen (T38); Wales	4.86 m GR PB	Erin Cleaver (T38); Australia	4.36 m	Taylor Doyle (T38); Australia	4.22 m
Javelin throw (F46)	Hollie Arnold (F46); Wales	44.43 m WR GR	Holly Robinson (F46); New Zealand	43.32 m AR	Friana Kwevira (F46); Vanuatu	24.54 m

== Records ==
- Broken Records in Athletics
