= Athletics at the 2018 Commonwealth Games – Men's 3000 metres steeplechase =

Men's 3000 metres steeplechase at the 2018 Commonwealth Games
- Venue: Carrara Stadium
- Dates: 13 April
- Competitors: 11 from 8 nations
- Winning time: 8:10.08 GR

Medalists
gold medal	Conseslus Kipruto	Kenya
silver medal	Abraham Kibiwott	Kenya
bronze medal	Amos Kirui	Kenya

The men's 3000 metres steeplechase at the 2018 Commonwealth Games, as part of the athletics programme, took place in the Carrara Stadium on 13 April 2018.

== Records ==
Prior to this competition, the existing world and Games records were as follows:

World record	Saif Saaeed Shaheen (QAT)	7:53.63	Brussels, Belgium	3 September 2003
Games record	Jonathan Ndiku (KEN)	8:10.44	Glasgow, Scotland	1 August 2014

== Schedule ==
The schedule was as follows:

Date	Time	Round
Friday 13 April 2018	19:30	Final

All times are Australian Eastern Standard Time (UTC+10)

== Results ==
With eleven entrants, the event was held as a straight final.

=== Final ===
Rank	Order	Name	Result	Notes
1st place, gold medalist(s)	4	Conseslus Kipruto (KEN)	8:10.08	GR
2nd place, silver medalist(s)	8	Abraham Kibiwott (KEN)	8:10.62	=SB
3rd place, bronze medalist(s)	10	Amos Kirui (KEN)	8:12.24	
4	7	Matthew Hughes (CAN)	8:12.33	SB
5	2	Albert Chemutai (UGA)	8:19.89	PB
6	5	Jonathan Hopkins (WAL)	8:34.12	
7	3	Ieuan Thomas (WAL)	8:40.02	
8	1	Adam Kirk-Smith (NIR)	8:48.40	
9	6	James Nipperess (AUS)	8:58.16	
10	9	Nikolas Fragkou (CYP)	9:03.12	
11	11	Simon Charley (VAN)	10:03.08	
