= Aline Furtado =

Brazilian rugby sevens player

- Full name: Aline Ribeiro Furtado
- Born: 2 October 1995 (age 31) São Paulo
- Height: 1.62 m (5 ft 4 in)
- Weight: 58 kg (128 lb)

Rugby union career
- Position: fullback
National sevens team
| Years | Team | Comps |
- Brazil

Aline Ribeiro Furtado (born 2 October 1995) is a Brazilian rugby sevens player. She made her debut appearance at the Olympics representing Brazil at the 2020 Summer Olympics.

== Career ==
Furtado was introduced to the sport of rugby sevens in 2017 when she was pursuing her degree in sports studies from the University of São Paulo. She previously engaged in athletics prior to switching to the rugby sevens. She completed her bachelor's degree in Physical Education at the University of São Paulo in 2018.

Furtado was part of Brazil squad which was invited to take part at the 2018–19 World Rugby Women's Sevens Series. She was also part of the national team at the 2019 Hong Kong Women's Sevens where Brazil emerged as champions of the competition defeating Scotland 28 – 19 in the final. As a result, Brazil also secured their place to compete at the 2019–20 World Rugby Women's Sevens Series.

Furtado was part of the Brazilian squad which finished at fourth place in the women's rugby sevens tournament at the 2019 Pan American Games. She was also named in the Brazilian rugby sevens squad to compete in the women's rugby sevens tournament at the 2020 Summer Olympics.

Furtado represented Brazil at the 2022 Rugby World Cup Sevens in Cape Town, they placed eleventh overall.

She was named as a traveling reserve for the Brazilian women's sevens team that competed at the 2024 Summer Olympics in Paris.
