= Athletics at the 2018 Commonwealth Games – Men's 1500 metres =

Men's 1500 metres at the 2018 Commonwealth Games
- Venue: Carrara Stadium
- Dates: 13 April (heats); 14 April (final)
- Competitors: 18 from 11 nations
- Winning time: 3:34.78

Medalists
gold medal	Elijah Manangoi	Kenya
silver medal	Timothy Cheruiyot	Kenya
bronze medal	Jake Wightman	Scotland

The men's 1500 metres at the 2018 Commonwealth Games, as part of the athletics programme, took place in the Carrara Stadium on 13 and 14 April 2018.

== Records ==
Prior to this competition, the existing world and Games records were as follows:

World record	Hicham El Guerrouj (MAR)	3:26.00	Rome, Italy	14 July 1998
Games record	Filbert Bayi (TAN)	3:32.16	Christchurch, New Zealand	2 February 1974

== Schedule ==
The schedule was as follows:

Date	Time	Round
Friday 13 April 2018	11:35	First round
Saturday 14 April 2018	16:10	Final

All times are Australian Eastern Standard Time (UTC+10)

== Results ==
=== First round ===
The first round consisted of two heats. The four fastest competitors per heat (plus four fastest losers) advanced to the final.

Heat 1

Rank	Order	Name	Result	Notes	Qual.
1	5	Timothy Cheruiyot (KEN)	3:42.95		Q
2	6	Ryan Gregson (AUS)	3:43.06		Q
3	9	Kumari Taki (KEN)	3:43.93		Q
4	1	Amine Khadiri (CYP)	3:44.29		Q
5	3	Chris O'Hare (SCO)	3:44.76		q
6	4	Harvey Dixon (GIB)	3:47.03		q
7	2	Luke Mathews (AUS)	3:47.08		q
8	8	Tom Marshall (WAL)	3:50.95		
9	7	Mohammad Dookun (MRI)	3:53.43		

Heat 2

Rank	Order	Name	Result	Notes	Qual.
1	9	Elijah Manangoi (KEN)	3:46.82		Q
2	8	Jinson Johnson (IND)	3:47.04		Q
3	5	Jake Wightman (SCO)	3:47.16		Q
4	7	Charlie Grice (ENG)	3:47.19		Q
5	4	Jordan Williamsz (AUS)	3:47.75		q
6	6	Ronald Musagala (UGA)	3:48.62		
7	1	Christos Dimitriou (CYP)	3:49.84	SB	
8	3	Rowan Axe (WAL)	3:49.89		
9	2	Elliott Dorey (JEY)	3:52.75		

=== Final ===
The medals were determined in the final.

Rank	Order	Name	Result	Notes
1st place, gold medalist(s)	11	Elijah Manangoi (KEN)	3:34.78	
2nd place, silver medalist(s)	5	Timothy Cheruiyot (KEN)	3:35.17	
3rd place, bronze medalist(s)	8	Jake Wightman (SCO)	3:35.97	
4	7	Charlie Grice (ENG)	3:37.43	
5	10	Jinson Johnson (IND)	3:37.86	NR
6	6	Jordan Williamsz (AUS)	3:38.34	
7	1	Kumari Taki (KEN)	3:38.74	
8	3	Chris O'Hare (SCO)	3:39.04	
9	12	Ryan Gregson (AUS)	3:39.24	
10	2	Amine Khadiri (CYP)	3:40.76	SB
11	4	Harvey Dixon (GIB)	3:43.84	NR
12	9	Luke Mathews (AUS)	3:47.04	
