= Mateitoga Bogidraumainadave =

Japan international rugby union player

- Born: 6 June 1984 (age 42) Fiji
- Height: 170 cm (5 ft 7 in)
- Weight: 96 kg (212 lb; 15 st 2 lb)

Rugby union career
- Position: Back row
Senior career
Years	Team	Apps	(Points)
- Arukas Queen Kumagaya
2020	Nanairo Prism Fukuoka		
2021–?	Mie Pearls		
International career
Years	Team	Apps	(Points)
2015–2022	Japan	13	(15)
National sevens team
Years	Team		Comps
2011–2019	Japan 7s		

Mateitoga Bogidraumainadave (born 6 June 1984) is a Fiji-born Japanese rugby union player. She competed for Japan at the 2017 Women's Rugby World Cup.

== Rugby career ==
=== XVs ===
Bogidraumainadave played for Arukas Queen Kumagaya and has also represented Japan internationally.

She was a standout player against Hong Kong during the Asia Rugby Women's Championship when Japan won their first championship title in 2015. She scored a hat-trick in the match.

In 2016, she featured for the Sakura fifteens side in their 55–0 thrashing of Fiji during the final qualifying tournament for the 2017 Women's Rugby World Cup.

In 2017, she made the Japanese squad to the World Cup in Ireland. She scored a try between the posts from off the back of a scrum for her side in their 72–14 loss to France in the pool stage.

In May 2022, Bogidraumainadave was part of the Sakura's squad in their Australian tour. She also featured in their two-test series against South Africa in July.

=== Sevens ===
Bogidraumainadave has competed for the Japan women's sevens team. She was part of the team that won the Dublin Women’s Sevens tournament at the UCD Bowl in 2015.

In 2017, she was instrumental in the Sakura sevens side's semi-final victory over Italy and their win against South Africa in the final of the Women’s Sevens Series qualifier at the Hong Kong Stadium.

She appeared for the side at the 2019 Hong Kong Women's Sevens in their bid for promotion to the 2019–20 Women's Series. Despite her scoring twice, the Sakura's lost to Scotland in the semi-final.

== Personal life ==
Bogidraumainadave graduated from the South Pacific Bible College.
