= Athletics at the 2018 Commonwealth Games – Women's 3000 metres steeplechase =

Women's 3000 metres steeplechase at the 2018 Commonwealth Games
- Venue: Carrara Stadium
- Dates: 11 April
- Competitors: 10 from 6 nations
- Winning time: 9:21.00

Medalists
gold medal	Aisha Praught-Leer	Jamaica
silver medal	Celliphine Chepteek Chespol	Kenya
bronze medal	Purity Cherotich Kirui	Kenya

The women's 3000 metres steeplechase at the 2018 Commonwealth Games, as part of the athletics programme, took place in the Carrara Stadium on 11 April 2018.

== Records ==
Prior to this competition, the existing world and Games records were as follows:

World record	Ruth Jebet (BHR)	8:52.78	Paris, France	27 August 2016
Games record	Dorcus Inzikuru (UGA)	9:19.51	Melbourne, Australia	22 March 2006

== Schedule ==
The schedule was as follows:

Date	Time	Round
Wednesday 11 April 2018	19:45	Final

All times are Australian Eastern Standard Time (UTC+10)

== Results ==
With ten entrants, the event was held as a straight final.

=== Final ===
Rank	Order	Name	Result	Notes
1st place, gold medalist(s)	1	Aisha Praught-Leer (JAM)	9:21.00	
2nd place, silver medalist(s)	10	Celliphine Chepteek Chespol (KEN)	9:22.61	
3rd place, bronze medalist(s)	8	Purity Cherotich Kirui (KEN)	9:25.74	
4	2	Rosie Clarke (ENG)	9:36.29	
5	4	Genevieve LaCaze (AUS)	9:42.69	
6	3	Fancy Cherono (KEN)	9:46.27	PB
7	7	Geneviève Lalonde (CAN)	9:46.68	
8	6	Iona Lake (ENG)	9:58.92	
9	9	Victoria Mitchell (AUS)	10:12.59	
10	5	Lennie Waite (SCO)	10:21.72	
