= Dhys Faleafaga =

- Born: 17 October 2000 (age 26) Wellington, New Zealand
- Height: 1.75 m (5 ft 9 in)
- Weight: 87 kg (192 lb)

Rugby union career
- Position: Loose forward
Provincial / State sides
Years	Team	Apps	(Points)
2017–2021	Wellington Pride	13	(40)
Super Rugby
Years	Team	Apps	(Points)
2022	Hurricanes Poua		(0)
2023	Chiefs Manawa	5	(5)
International career
Years	Team	Apps	(Points)
2021	New Zealand	2	(0)
National sevens team
Years	Team		Comps
2019, 2024–	New Zealand		33 apps

Dhys Faleafaga (born 17 October 2000) is a New Zealand rugby union and sevens player. She plays for Chiefs Manawa in the Super Rugby Aupiki competition and for Wellington provincially. She has played for the Black Ferns and the Black Ferns Sevens internationally.

== Personal life ==
Faleafaga attended St Mary's College and played for their First XV. They won the National First XV and Sevens titles in 2016 and 2017. Her mother, Vanessa was a flanker who represented Samoa at the 2002 and 2006 Women's Rugby World Cups. She also played netball for the Central Pulse. Her older sister, Lyric Faleafaga, was previously a member of the Black Ferns Sevens squad.

== Rugby career ==
=== 2017–2018 ===
Faleafaga made her debut for the Wellington Pride in 2017. In 2018, she was one of 28 female rugby players to be the first-ever 15s players to be offered Black Ferns contracts by New Zealand Rugby.

=== 2019 ===
Faleafaga was contracted by the Black Ferns Sevens squad as an injury replacement in 2019. She made her rugby sevens debut for New Zealand at the 2019 Japan Women's Sevens in Kitakyushu.

=== 2021–2023 ===
In 2021, she was named in the Black Ferns squad for the end of year tour of England and France. She later made her Black Ferns debut against England on 31 October 2021 in Exeter.

The Hurricanes named her in their squad for the historic Super Rugby Aupiki competition. She signed with Chiefs Manawa for the competitions second season.

=== 2024 ===
After taking a break from rugby to give birth to twin sons, Faleafaga was in February 2024 named in the Black Fern Sevens squad for the remainder of the 2023–24 season.
