= 2018 Asia Rugby Women's Sevens Series =

- Hosts: Hong Kong; South Korea; Sri Lanka
- Date: 14 September – 14 October

Final positions
- Champions: Japan
- Runners-up: China
- Third: Kazakhstan

The 2018 Asia Rugby Women's Sevens Series was the nineteenth edition of Asia's continental sevens tournament. The series will be played over three legs in Hong Kong, South Korea, and Sri Lanka.

The top two teams that are not already core teams on the 2018–19 World Rugby Women's Sevens Series will earn qualification to the 2019 Hong Kong Women's Sevens for a chance to earn core team status for the following World Series.

== Teams ==
- China
- Hong Kong
- Japan
- Kazakhstan
- Singapore
- South Korea
- Sri Lanka
- Thailand

== Hong Kong ==
The tournament was held 14–15 September in Hong Kong. All times in Hong Kong Time (UTC+08:00).

=== Pool stage ===
Legend
Advances to Cup
Advances to Plate

Pool C

Teams	Pld	W	D	L	PF	PA	+/−	Pts
Japan	3	3	0	0	110	7	+103	9
Hong Kong	3	2	0	1	63	38	+25	7
Thailand	3	1	0	2	31	65	–34	5
South Korea	3	0	0	3	12	106	–94	3

14 September 2018
13:14

Hong Kong	22–7	Thailand

HKFC

14 September 2018
13:36

Japan	48–0	South Korea

HKFC

14 September 2018
16:10

Thailand	24–12	South Korea

HKFC

14 September 2018
16:32

Japan	31–7	Hong Kong

HKFC

15 September 2018
10:44

Japan	31–0	Thailand

HKFC

15 September 2018
11:06

Hong Kong	34–0	South Korea

HKFC

Pool D

Teams	Pld	W	D	L	PF	PA	+/−	Pts
China	3	3	0	0	88	14	+74	9
Kazakhstan	3	2	0	1	74	31	+43	7
Sri Lanka	3	1	0	2	17	77	–60	5
Singapore	3	0	0	3	15	72	–57	3

14 September 2018
12:30

Kazakhstan	36–0	Sri Lanka

HKFC

14 September 2018
12:52

China	31–0	Singapore

HKFC

14 September 2018
15:26

Sri Lanka	17–5	Singapore

HKFC

14 September 2018
15:48

China	21–14	Kazakhstan

HKFC

15 September 2018
10:00

China	36–0	Sri Lanka

HKFC

15 September 2018
10:22

Kazakhstan	24–10	Singapore

HKFC

=== Knockout stage ===
Plate

Semi-finals
15 September – 12:56 – HKFC
South Korea	15
Sri Lanka	21
15 September – 13:18 – HKFC
Thailand	19
Singapore	5

Plate Final
15 September – 16:18 – HKFC
Sri Lanka	22
Thailand	10
Seventh place
15 September – 15:56 – HKFC
South Korea	0
Singapore	27

Cup

Semi-finals
15 September – 13:40 – HKFC
Japan	21
Kazakhstan	15
15 September – 14:02 – HKFC
Hong Kong	14
China	19

Cup Final
15 September – 18:08 – HKFC
Japan	12
China	7
Third place
15 September – 17:24 – HKFC
Kazakhstan	14
Hong Kong	5

== South Korea ==
The tournament was held 29–30 September in Incheon. All times in Korea Standard Time (UTC+09:00).

=== Pool stage ===
Legend
Advances to Cup
Advances to Plate

Pool C

Teams	Pld	W	D	L	PF	PA	+/−	Pts
Japan	3	3	0	0	113	12	+101	9
Hong Kong	3	2	0	1	68	34	+34	7
Sri Lanka	3	1	0	2	22	87	–65	5
South Korea	3	0	0	3	15	85	–70	3

29 September 2018
12:14

Hong Kong	41–0	Sri Lanka

Namdong Asiad

29 September 2018
12:36

Japan	48–0	South Korea

Namdong Asiad

29 September 2018
15:34

Sri Lanka	22–5	South Korea

Namdong Asiad

29 September 2018
15:56

Japan	24–12	Hong Kong

Namdong Asiad

30 September 2018
10:44

Japan	41–0	Sri Lanka

Namdong Asiad

30 September 2018
11:06

Hong Kong	15–10	South Korea

Namdong Asiad

Pool D

Teams	Pld	W	D	L	PF	PA	+/−	Pts
Kazakhstan	3	3	0	0	92	5	+87	9
China	3	2	0	1	67	27	+40	7
Thailand	3	1	0	2	36	43	–7	5
Singapore	3	0	0	3	7	127	–120	3

29 September 2018
11:30

Kazakhstan	17–0	Thailand

Namdong Asiad

29 September 2018
11:52

China	43–0	Singapore

Namdong Asiad

29 September 2018
14:50

Thailand	36–7	Singapore

Namdong Asiad

29 September 2018
15:12

China	5–27	Kazakhstan

Namdong Asiad

30 September 2018
10:00

China	19–0	Thailand

Namdong Asiad

30 September 2018
10:22

Kazakhstan	48–0	Singapore

Namdong Asiad

=== Knockout stage ===
Plate

Semi-finals
30 September – 12:56 – Namdong Asiad
South Korea	12
Thailand	20
30 September – 13:18 – Namdong Asiad
Sri Lanka	15
Singapore	10

Plate Final
30 September – 16:28 – Namdong Asiad
Thailand	5
Sri Lanka	22
Seventh place
30 September – 16:06 – Namdong Asiad
South Korea	7
Singapore	19

Cup

Semi-finals
30 September – 13:40 – Namdong Asiad
Japan	10
China	5
30 September – 14:02 – Namdong Asiad
Hong Kong	14
Kazakhstan	26

Cup Final
30 September – 18:18 – Namdong Asiad
Japan	17
Kazakhstan	12
Third place
30 September – 17:34 – Namdong Asiad
China	31
Hong Kong	10

== Sri Lanka ==
The tournament will be held 13–14 October in Colombo. All times in Sri Lanka Standard Time (UTC+05:30).

=== Pool stage ===
Legend
Advances to Cup
Advances to Plate

Pool C

Teams	Pld	W	D	L	PF	PA	+/−	Pts
Japan	3	3	0	0	106	7	+99	9
Hong Kong	3	2	0	1	63	31	+32	7
Sri Lanka	3	1	0	2	26	68	−42	5
South Korea	3	0	0	3	10	99	−89	3

13 October 2018
14:14

Hong Kong	29−0	Sri Lanka

Racecourse Stadium

13 October 2018
14:36

Japan	46−0	South Korea

Racecourse Stadium

13 October 2018
17:20

Sri Lanka	26−10	South Korea

Racecourse Stadium

13 October 2018
17:42

Japan	31−7	Hong Kong

Racecourse Stadium

14 October 2018
10:44

Japan	29−0	Sri Lanka

Racecourse Stadium

14 October 2018
11:06

Hong Kong	27−0	South Korea

Racecourse Stadium

Pool D

Teams	Pld	W	D	L	PF	PA	+/−	Pts
China	3	2	1	0	87	0	+87	8
Kazakhstan	3	2	1	0	77	5	+72	8
Thailand	3	1	0	1	19	71	−52	5
Singapore	3	0	0	3	0	107	−107	3

13 October 2018
13:30

China	35−0	Thailand

Racecourse Stadium

13 October 2018
13:52

Kazakhstan	41−0	Singapore

Racecourse Stadium

13 October 2018
16:36

Thailand	14−0	Singapore

Racecourse Stadium

13 October 2018
16:58

Kazakhstan	0−0	China

Racecourse Stadium

14 October 2018
10:00

Kazakhstan	36−5	Thailand

Racecourse Stadium

14 October 2018
10:22

China	52−0	Singapore

Racecourse Stadium

=== Knockout stage ===
Plate

Semi-finals
14 October – 12:56 – Racecourse Stadium
South Korea	10
Thailand	26
14 October – 13:18 – Racecourse Stadium
Sri Lanka	40
Singapore	0

Plate Final
14 October – 16:28 – Racecourse Stadium
Thailand	5
Sri Lanka	7
Seventh place
14 October – 16:06 – Racecourse Stadium
South Korea	19
Singapore	15

Cup

Semi-finals
14 October – 13:40 – Racecourse Stadium
Japan	26
Kazakhstan	12
14 October – 14:02 – Racecourse Stadium
Hong Kong	17
China	7

Cup Final
14 October – 18:28 – Racecourse Stadium
Japan	31
Hong Kong	0
Third place
14 October – 17:34 – Racecourse Stadium
Kazakhstan	12
China	17

== Final standings ==
Legend
Qualified to 2019 Hong Kong Women's Sevens
Already in Women's Sevens Series
Relegated for 2019 Series

Rank	Team	Hong Kong	South Korea	Sri Lanka	Points
1	Japan	12	12	12	36
2	China	10	8	8	26
3	Kazakhstan	8	10	7	25
4	Hong Kong	7	7	10	24
5	Sri Lanka	4	4	4	12
6	Thailand	3	3	3	9
7	Singapore	2	2	1	5
8	South Korea	1	1	2	4

== See also ==
- 2018 Asia Rugby Sevens Series
- 2019 Hong Kong Women's Sevens
