= Vivian Okwach =

Kenyan rugby sevens player

- Born: 9 February 1999 (age 27)
- Height: 1.60 m (5 ft 3 in)

Rugby union career
National sevens team
Years	Team	Comps
2021	Kenya	

Vivian Okwach (born 9 February 1999) is a Kenyan rugby sevens player. She competed in the 2020 Summer Olympics as part of the Kenyan team that qualified for the Olympics after South Africa declined their spot.
