= Gianni Ciofani =

Italian scientist

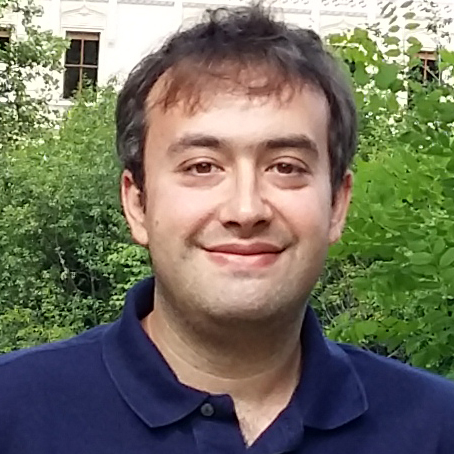
- Born: August 14, 1982 (age 44); La Spezia.

Gianni Ciofani (born August 14, 1982) is an Italian scientist. He is senior researcher tenured (equivalent to full professor) at the Istituto Italiano di Tecnologia.(Italian Institute of Technology, IIT). His research interests are mainly in the field of smart nanomaterials for nanomedicine, including the bio/non-biointeractions, and the biological processes in altered gravity conditions.

== Career ==
He obtained a Ph.D. at the Scuola Scuperiore Sant'Anna of Pisa.

He won an ERC starting grant in 2016 and he is principal investigator of the Smart Bio-Interfaces Research Line and Coordinator of the Center for Materials Interfaces at the Istituto Italiano di Tecnologia, where he works at the seat in Pontedera. He was also professor at the Polytechnic University of Turin.

== Research ==
He studied therapeutic strategies for tumors and brain diseases: for example the use of nanobots against glioblastoma and nanoparticles of barium titanate that can convert mechanical energy in an electric potential able to excite brain cells. He is studying also antioxidant agents derived from natural products against Parkinson's disease.

Another topic of his research is the health of astronauts and living bodies in space, specifically the effect of gravity on the production of radicals and the possible use of nanoparticles (nanoceria) to prevent oxidative stress. He coordinated on the topic Project PlanOx2, in collaboration with ESA and in 2022 the PROMETEO (Protezione Antiossidante) project.

== Awards ==
- 2023, Knight of the Order of Merit of the Italian Republic
