= Mathrin Simmers =

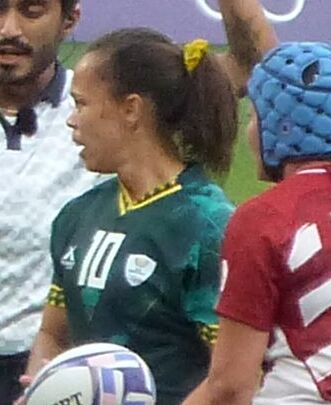
- Simmers at the 2024 Summer Olympics
- Born: 3 March 1988 (age 38) Knysna, South Africa
- Height: 162 cm (5 ft 4 in)
- Weight: 64 kg (141 lb; 10 st 1 lb)

Rugby union career
National sevens team
Years	Team	Comps
2012–2025	South Africa	94 (100 pts)

Mathrin Simmers (born 3 March 1988) is a South African rugby sevens player.

== Rugby career ==
Simmers competed for South Africa at the 2018 Commonwealth Games in Gold Coast, Queensland, Australia. She was selected again to represent South Africa at the 2018 Rugby World Cup Sevens in San Francisco.

Simmers was named in South Africa's squad for the 2022 Commonwealth Games in Birmingham where they finished in seventh place. She was later selected to represent South Africa at the 2022 Rugby World Cup Sevens in Cape Town.

She was a member of the South African side that competed at the 2024 Summer Olympics in Paris.
