= Sarah Ndunde =

Kenyan rugby sevens player

Personal information
- Nationality: Kenyan
- Born: 13 February 1997 (age 28)

Sport
- Sport: Rugby sevens

Sarah Ndunde (born 13 February 1997) is a Kenyan rugby sevens player. She competed in the women's tournament at the 2020 Summer Olympics.
