= Sinaida Omondi =

Kenyan rugby sevens player

Sinaida Omondi OLY
Personal information
- National team: Kenya
- Born: 10 May 1991 (age 35)

Sport
- Sport: Rugby sevens

Sinaida Omondi (born 10 May 1991) is a Kenyan rugby sevens player. She competed in the women's tournament at the 2020 Summer Olympics.
