= Stellah Wafula =

Kenyan rugby sevens player

Stella Wafula
Personal information
- Nationality: Kenyan
- Born: 7 July 1998 (age 27)

Sport
- Sport: Rugby sevens

Stella Wafula (born 7 July 1998) is a Kenyan rugby sevens player. She competed in the women's tournament at the 2020 Summer Olympics.
