= Anthony Wambani =

Kenyan footballer

Personal information
- Full name: Anthony Wambani Atieno
- Date of birth: 7 August 1999 (age 27)
- Place of birth: Nairobi, Kenya
- Height: 1.83 m (6 ft 0 in)
- Position: Midfielder

Team information
- Current team: Vasalund IF
- Number: 26

Senior career*
Years	Team	Apps	(Gls)
2016–2018	Bandari	36	(5)
2018–	Vasalund IF	129	(14)

International career^{‡}
2019–	Kenya	4	(0)
- * Club domestic league appearances and goals as of 29 November 2023 ‡ National team caps and goals as of 16:42, 7 November 2021 (UTC)

Anthony Wambani Atieno (born 7 August 1999) is a Kenyan professional footballer who plays as a midfielder for Vasalund IF and the Kenya national team.

== Career ==
Wambani joined the Swedish club Vasalund IF in 2018 from the Kenyan club Bandari, and helped them achieve promotion into the Superettan in his debut season.

== International career ==
Wambani debuted with the Kenya national team in a 1–0 2019 CECAFA Cup win over Tanzania on 8 December 2019.
