= Diana Ochieng =

Kenyan rugby sevens player

Personal information
- Nationality: Kenyan
- Born: 20 October 1992 (age 32)

Sport
- Sport: Rugby sevens

Diana Ochieng (born 20 October 1992) is a Kenyan rugby sevens player. She competed in the women's tournament at the 2020 Summer Olympics.
