= Anne-Cécile Ciofani =

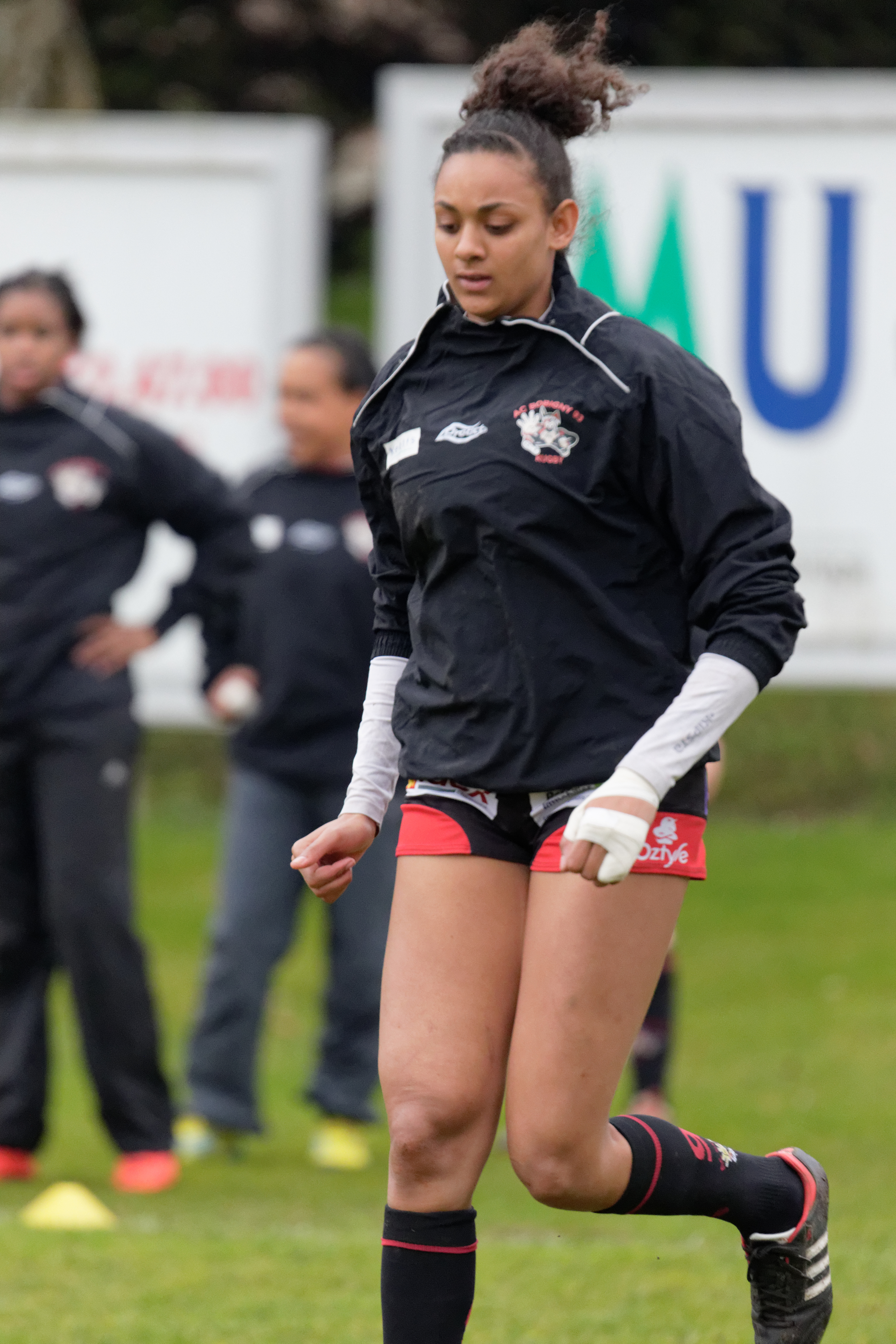
- Ciofani in 2015
- Born: 14 December 1993 (age 32) Colombes, France
- Height: 1.80 m (5 ft 11 in)
- Weight: 72 kg (159 lb)

Rugby union career
Senior career
Years	Team	Apps	(Points)
2018-	AC Bobigny		
National sevens team
Years	Team		Comps
2018-	France 7s		
Medal record
Women's rugby sevens
Representing France
Olympic Games
Silver medal – second place	2020 Tokyo	Team competition

Anne-Cécile Ciofani (born 14 December 1993) is a French rugby player. She was named World Rugby Women’s Sevens Player of the Year for 2021.

== Career ==
She discovered rugby at age 18 when she started studying Science and technology of physical and sports activities (STAPS), while she practiced the heptathlon:

With my speed skills, I knew I could do it. The opportunity to reach the very highest level pushed me as much as the practice.

Six months after her debut, however, she was summoned to the Elite Center of Marcoussis, but was only selected in the national team in 2018.

In 2018, when she finished her first year as a professional player at AC Bobigny, she became vice-champion of the world of rugby 7 with the France team. She scored a test on the last action in the game against the Olympic champion Australia, which qualified France in the final, and was elected best new player of the world tournament.

She was a member of the French women's sevens team that competed at the 2024 Summer Olympics.

== Personal life ==
She came from a sporting family, both parents participated in Olympiads, her father Walter Ciofani in the hammer throw in Los Angeles in 1984, and her Cameroonian mother Jeanne Ngo Minyemeck in women's shot put and the women's discus throw at Seoul in 1988. Her sisters Juliette (Junior French Champion) and Audrey Ciofani (French Champion Hope and Vice Elite Champion) are athletes at the hammer throw and licensed at the Athletic Circle of Montreuil 93.

In 2022, Ciofani married Geoffray Durbant, who is a professional footballer.
