= Daria Lushina =

Russian rugby sevens player

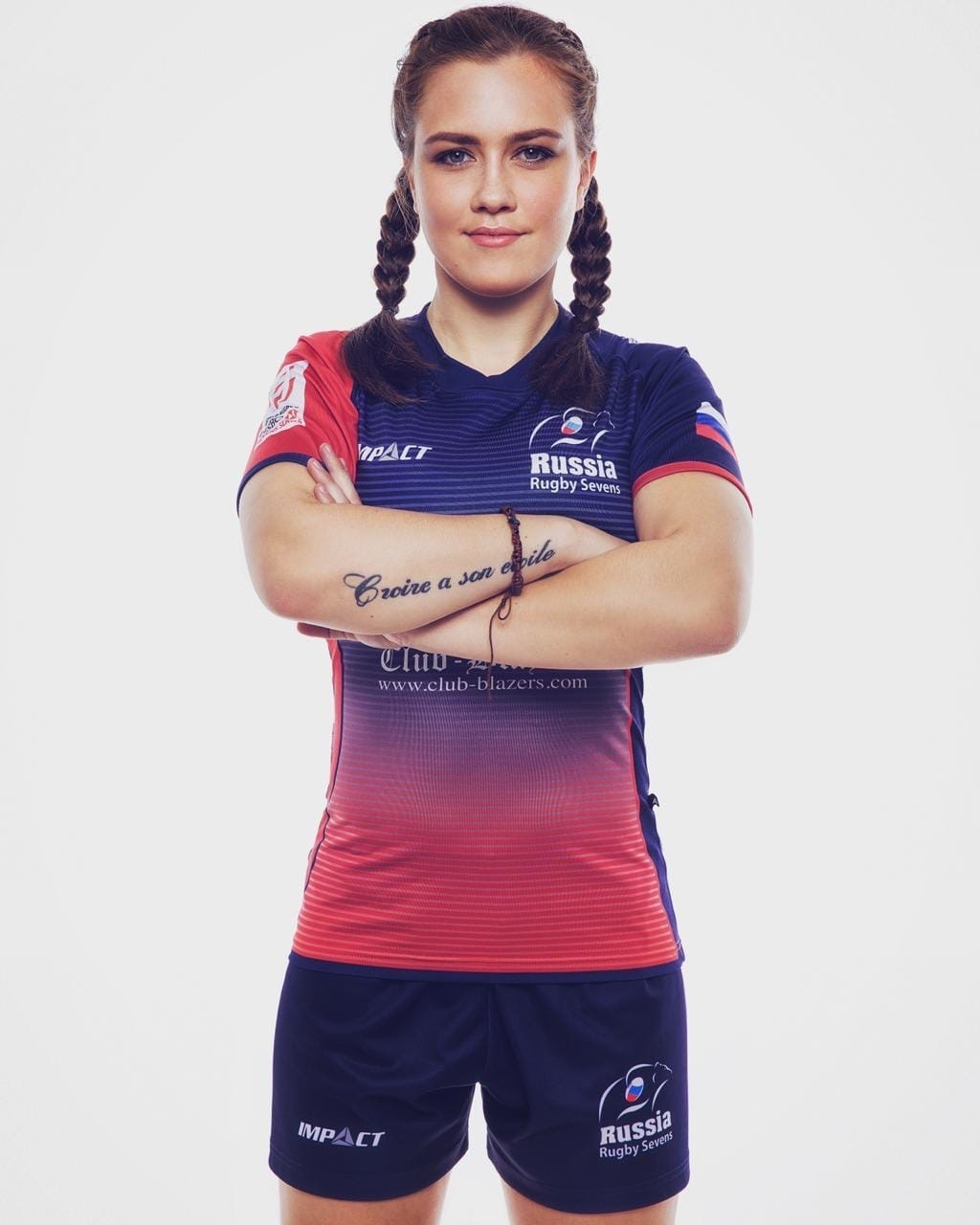
- Daria Lushina
- Full name: Daria Vladimirovna Lushina
- Born: 1 November 1996 (age 30) Lyudinovo, Russia
- Height: 1.68 m (5 ft 6 in)
- Weight: 66 kg (146 lb)

Rugby union career
National sevens team
| Years | Team | Comps |
| 2012–Present | Russia | 114 (241 pts) |

Daria Vladimirovna Lushina (Russian: Дарья Владимировна Лушина; born 1 November 1996) is a Russian rugby sevens player. She competed in the women's tournament at the 2020 Summer Olympics.
