= Grace Adhiambo =

Kenyan rugby sevens player

- Born: 16 March 1998 (age 28)
- Height: 1.71 m (5 ft 7 in)

Rugby union career
- Position: Fly-half
Senior career
Years	Team	Apps	(Points)
2026	Mumbai Dreamers		
International career
Years	Team	Apps	(Points)
2021	Kenya		(0)
National sevens team
Years	Team		Comps
2020	Kenya		

Grace Adhiambo Okulu (born 16 March 1998) is a Kenyan rugby union and sevens player. She competed for Kenya in the 2020 Summer Olympics.

== Background ==
Okulu discovered rugby while playing football in primary school. In 2016, she made her debut for Kenya's sevens team at 17, just as the Kenya Sevens team made their debut at the Women's Sevens Series in France.

Okulu was the only scorer against Fiji in their placing match at the 2018 Commonwealth Games in Gold Coast. She also played a crucial role in her team's qualification for the 2020 Summer Olympics in Tokyo as she was a dependable try-scorer during their qualifiers in Tunisia.

In 2021, Okulu made her fifteens debut in the Lionesses 2021 Rugby World Cup qualifying match against Colombia in Nairobi. She scored five points from a conversion, and a penalty in her side's loss.

Okulu signed with the Japanese, Kitakyushu-based, club Nagato Blue Angels on a six-month contract in the beginning of 2023. She was named in Kenya's fifteens squad on 3 October 2023 for the inaugural WXV 3 tournament that will be held in Dubai.
