= Purity Cherotich Kirui =

Kenyan long-distance runner

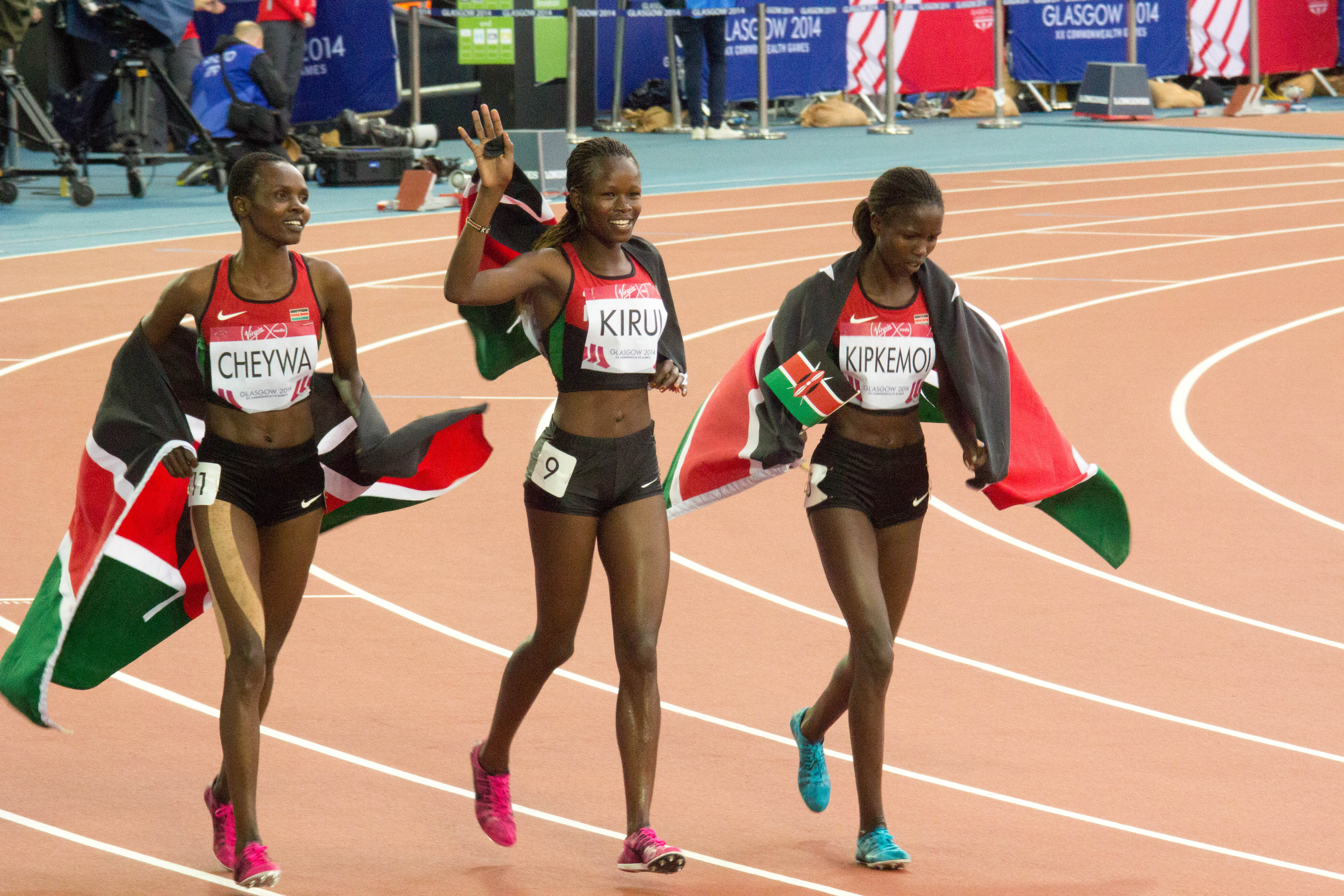
- Purity Cherotich Kirui (centre) in 2014

Medal record

Women's athletics

Representing Kenya

Commonwealth Games
Gold medal – first place	2014 Glasgow	3000 m s'chase
Bronze medal – third place	2018 Gold Coast	3000 m s'chase

African Games
Bronze medal – third place	2015 Brazzaville	3000 m s'chase

Purity Cherotich Kirui (born 13 August 1991) is a Kenyan long-distance runner who specialises in the 3000 metres steeplechase. She holds a personal best of 9:19.42 minutes for the event. She was the gold medallist at the 2014 Commonwealth Games and the 2010 World Junior Championships in Athletics.

Born in Kericho, her international debut came at the 2008 Commonwealth Youth Games, where she was seventh in the 1500 metres and also ran for Kenya as part of their 4×400 metres relay. She emerged as a steeplechase specialist in the 2010 season by winning the gold medal at the 2010 World Junior Championships in Athletics.

She made her first performances on the international track and field circuit in 2011 and had a series of top three finishes at IAAF World Challenge-level meets. She was in the top ten at three IAAF Diamond League races, but managed only seventh at the Kenyan Athletics Championships. She competed less frequently in 2012, with her best run coming at the Meeting Iberoamericano in Spain, where she was third in a best of 9:35.61 minutes. She was over ten minutes at the Kenyan Olympic trials, so did not gain selection. A quick race opened her 2013 season in May and her run of 9:19.42 minutes for sixth at the Doha Diamond League meeting ranked her sixth fastest in the world that year, as well as the top thirty all-time rankings. She was in the top five at the Adidas Grand Prix and Memorial Van Damme, but the same placing at the national trials meant another year without international competition for Kirui.

Kirui was more consistent in 2014, coming fourth at the Shanghai Diamond League then winning the IAAF World Challenge Beijing in a meet record of 9:25.68 minutes. She claimed her first national title in June, then ran 9:23.43 minutes to place second behind Sofia Assefa in New York. Her performances earned her selection to compete for Kenya at the 2014 Commonwealth Games and led her country to a medal sweep of the women's steeplechase, defeating Milcah Cheywa (the defending champion and reigning world champion).
