= Philadelphia Olando =

- Born: February 18, 1990 (age 36)
- Height: 1.54 m (5 ft 1/2 in)
- Weight: 72 kg (159 lb; 11 st 5 lb)

Rugby union career
National sevens team
Years	Team	Comps
- Kenya 7s

Philadelphia Olando (born February 18, 1990) is a Kenyan rugby sevens player. She competed at the 2016 Summer Olympics as the captain of the Kenya women's national rugby sevens team.
