= Amos Kirui =

Kenyan athletics competitor

Personal information
- Nationality: Kenyan
- Born: 9 February 1998 (age 28)

Sport
- Sport: Track and field
- Event: 5000 metres 10,000 metres 2000 metres steeplechase 3000 metres steeplechase

Amos Kirui (born 9 February 1998) is a Kenyan distance runner who competes in the 3000 metres steeplechase. He was the gold medallist at the 2016 IAAF World U20 Championships, extending his nation's grip on the event since 1988. Kirui was a silver medallist in the steeplechase at the 2014 Summer Youth Olympics and a bronze medallist at the 2014 African Youth Games. He shared in a junior team silver at the 2017 IAAF World Cross Country Championships.

== Personal bests ==
Event	Time	Venue	Date
5000 metres	13:25.91	Kumamoto	2 APR 2016
10,000 metres	28:08.98	Gifu	8 MAY 2016
2000 metres steeplechase	5:39.23	Botswana National Stadium	29 MAY 2014
3000 metres steeplechase	8:08.37	Rome (Stadio Olimpico)	24 JUL 2016
