= Camilla Atieno =

Kenyan rugby sevens player

Personal information
- Nationality: Kenyan
- Born: 17 April 1995 (age 29)
- Height: 1.8 m (5 ft 11 in)
- Weight: 64 kg (141 lb)

Sport
- Sport: Rugby sevens

Camilla Atieno (born 17 April 1995) is a Kenyan rugby sevens player. She competed in the women's tournament at the 2020 Summer Olympics.
