= 2017 Pan American U20 Athletics Championships =

XIX Pan American U20 Athletics Championships
- Dates: July 21-July 23
- Host city: Trujillo, Peru
- Venue: Mansiche Sports Complex
- Level: U20
- Events: 44
- Participation: 418 athletes from 31 nations

The 2017 Pan American U20 Athletics Championships was the nineteenth edition of the biennial track and field competition for under-20 athletes from the Americas, organised by the Association of Panamerican Athletics. It was held in Trujillo, Peru, at the Mansiche Sports Complex from 21 to 23 July. The United States topped the medal table with 54 medals total including 22 gold.

== Medal summary ==
=== Men ===
Event	Gold		Silver		Bronze	
100 metres -0.4 m/s	Tarrick Brock; United States	10.45	Paulo André de Oliveira; Brazil	10.46	Felipe dos Santos; Brazil	10.47
200 metres +0.5 m/s	Christopher Taylor; Jamaica	20.38	Tyrese Cooper; United States	20.59	Derick Silva; Brazil	20.77
400 metres	Jamal Walton; Cayman Islands	44.99 CR, NR	Josephus Lyles; United States	45.30	Zachary Shinnick; United States	45.98
800 metres	Ryan Sánchez; Puerto Rico	1:46.41 CR	Marco Arop; Canada	1:47.08	Italo de Araujo; Brazil	1:49.87
1500 metres	Eric Van Der Els; United States	3:43.16	Kyle Madden; Canada	3:44.19	Cooper Teare; United States	3:46.46
5000 metres	Carlos Hernández; Colombia	14:53.93	Thomas Fafard; Canada	14:55.35	Yuri Labra; Peru	14:57.11
10,000 metres	Steven Cross; United States	32:09.66	Aidan Reed; United States	32:10.15	Yuri Labra; Peru	32:13.33
110 metres hurdles (99 cm) -1.6 m/s	Eric Edwards; United States	13.33	Anastasios Eliopo; Canada	13.36	Joseph Anderson; United States	13.43
400 metres hurdles	Quincy Hall; United States	49.02 CR	Fernando Arodi Vega; Mexico	49.96	Cory Poole; United States	50.14
3000 m steeplechase	Jean-Simon Desgagnes; Canada	8:56.57	Nathan Mylenek; United States	9:00.70	Edwar Condori; Peru	9:03.22
4 × 100 m relay	United States; Anthony Schwartz; Cravont Charleston; Sean Hooper; Tarrick Brock	39.33	Jamaica; Carey McLeod; Christopher Taylor; Ashanie Smith; Anthony Carpenter	39.74	Trinidad and Tobago; Akanni Hislop; Jalen Purcell; Tyrell Edwards; Jerod Elcock	39.90
4 × 400 m relay	United States; Zachary Shinnick; Josephus Lyles; Brian Herron; Sean Hooper	3:00.33 WU20R	Jamaica; Shemar Chambers; Anthony Carpenter; Javauney James; Christopher Taylor	3:03.77	Trinidad and Tobago; Zidan Martin; Judah Taylor; Terry Frederick; Jacob St. Clair	3:10.36
10,000 m track walk	David Hurtado; Ecuador	40:37.64	Andrés Olivas; Mexico	40:45.31	Jhonatan Amores; Ecuador	42:03.53
High jump	Roberto Vílches; Mexico	2.21	Jermaine Francis; Saint Kitts and Nevis	2.19	Justice Summerset; United States	2.19
Pole vault	Tate Curran; United States	5.20	Natán Rivera; El Salvador	5.10	Josué Gutiérrez; Peru	5.00
Long jump	Ja'Mari Ward; United States	7.77w	Gabriel Oliveira; Brazil	7.73	Holland Martin; Bahamas	7.66
Triple jump	Arturo Rodríguez; Cuba	15.93	Joe Javier Mendez; Ecuador	15.52	Isaiah Griffith; United States	15.50
Shot put (6 kg)	Jordan Geist; United States	22.02 CR	Kevin Nedrick; Jamaica	20.34	Adrian Piperi; United States	20.26
Discus throw (1.75 kg)	Claudio Romero; Chile	62.09	Turner Washington; United States	61.30	Kevin Nedrick; Jamaica	58.86
Hammer throw (6 kg)	Joshua Hernandez; United States	72.55	Miguel Zamora; Cuba	72.03	Alencar Pereira; Brazil	67.14
Javelin throw	Pedro Henrique Rodrigues; Brazil	74.58	Ronny Cedeño; Cuba	70.69	Liam Christensen; United States	67.25
Decathlon (junior)	George Patrick; United States	7514	Kyle Garland; United States	7212	Jordan de Souza; Brazil	7036
WR world record | AR area record | CR championship record | GR games record | NR national record | OR Olympic record | PB personal best | SB season best | WL world leading (in a given season)

=== Women ===
Event	Gold		Silver		Bronze	
100 metres -0.3 m/s	Khalifa St. Fort; Trinidad and Tobago	11.32	Rebekah Smith; United States	11.55	Symone Mason; United States	11.62
200 metres +0.9 m/s	Ashlan Best; Canada	23.27	Symone Mason; United States	23.42	Gabriele Cunningham; United States	23.60
400 metres	Roxana Gomez; Cuba	51.46 CR	Jaevin Reed; United States	51.71	Kyra Constantine; Canada	52.63
800 metres	Victoria Tachinski; Canada	2:04.22	Jazz Shukla; Canada	2:04.52	Caitlin Collier; United States	2:05.26
1500 metres	Lucia Stafford; Canada	4:21.70	Laura Parkinson; Canada	4:25.03	Michelle Magnani; United States	4:25.65
3000 metres	Taylor Werner; United States	9:16.12	Taryn O'Neill; Canada	9:22.05	Sevanne Ghazarian; Canada	9:23.73
5000 metres	Laura Dickinson; Canada	16:39.50	María de Jesús Ruiz; Mexico	16:41.01	Samantha Drop; United States	16:44.01
100 metres hurdles +0.4 m/s	Tia Jones; United States	13.01	Tara Davis; United States	13.05	Maribel Caicedo; Ecuador	13.41
400 metres hurdles	Brandee Johnson; United States	56.65	Xahria Santiago; Canada	57.01	Masai Russell; United States	57.55
3000 m steeplechase	Sarah Edwards; United States	10:10.68	Alondra Negron; Puerto Rico	10:13.73	Alexandra Harris; United States	10:14.76
4 × 100 m relay	United States; Gabriele Cunningham; Rebekah Smith; Sha'Carri Richardson; Tara Davis	44.07	Jamaica; Amoi Brown; Aneka Brisset; Kasheika Cameron; Patrice Moody	44.92	Canada; Shyvonne Roxborough; Ashlan Best; Eunice Boateng; Keira Galloway	45.14
4 × 400 m relay	United States; Syaira Richardson; Jaevin Reed; Arria Minor; Takyera Roberson	3:28.57 CR	Canada; Xahria Santiago; Victoria Tachinski; Ashlan Best; Kyra Constantine	3:33.19	Ecuador; Deyanira Ortiz; Josselyn Montiel; Coraima Cortez; Tania Caicedo	3:46.57
10,000 m track walk	Alegna González; Mexico	44:43.89 CR	María Montoya; Colombia	45:52.92	Evelyn Inga; Peru	47:18.71
High jump	María Fernanda Murillo; Colombia	1.85	Jelena Rowe; United States	1.82	Mikella Oatis; Canada	1.82
Long jump	Tara Davis; United States	6.51	Tissanna Hickling; Jamaica	6.36	Tyra Gittens; Trinidad and Tobago	6.22
Triple jump	Davisleidis Velazco; Cuba	13.59	Jaimie Robinson; United States	13.32	Jasmine Moore; United States	13.25
Shot put	Alyssa Wilson; United States	17.70	María Fernanda Orozco; Mexico	16.57	Samantha Noening; United States	15.66
Discus throw	Laulauga Collins; United States	59.29	Alma Pollorena; Mexico	53.68	Gabrielle Rains; Canada	53.06
Hammer throw	Camryn Rogers; Canada	63.42	Ayamey Medina; Cuba	62.18	Mariana García; Chile	58.90
Javelin throw	Juleisy Angulo; Ecuador	52.30	Fabielle Samira Ferreira; Brazil	51.15	Katelyn Gochenour; United States	50.56
Heptathlon	Adriana Rodríguez; Cuba	5733 CR	Ariel Okorie; United States	5253	Dallyssa Huggins; Canada	5237
WR world record | AR area record | CR championship record | GR games record | NR national record | OR Olympic record | PB personal best | SB season best | WL world leading (in a given season)

== Medal table ==
* Host nation (Peru)

Rank	Nation	Gold	Silver	Bronze	Total
1	United States	22	14	18	54
2	Canada	6	9	7	22
3	Cuba	4	3	0	7
4	Mexico	2	5	0	7
5	Ecuador	2	1	3	6
6	Colombia	2	1	0	3
7	Jamaica	1	5	1	7
8	Brazil	1	3	5	9
9	Puerto Rico	1	1	0	2
10	Trinidad and Tobago	1	0	3	4
11	Chile	1	0	1	2
12	Cayman Islands	1	0	0	1
13	El Salvador	0	1	0	1
13	Saint Kitts and Nevis	0	1	0	1
15	Peru*	0	0	5	5
16	Bahamas	0	0	1	1
Totals (16 entries)		44	44	44	132
