= H. Junior Engbrecht =

American politician

Member of the South Dakota House of Representatives from the 17th district
- In office January 12, 1999 – January 9, 2001
- Preceded by: Caitlin Collier; Gary Sokolow
- Succeeded by: Ben Nesselhuf

Personal details
- Born: May 22, 1929 Dolton, South Dakota
- Died: December 6, 2007 (aged 78) Parker, South Dakota
- Party: Republican

H. Junior Engbrecht (May 22, 1929 – December 6, 2007) was an American politician who served in the South Dakota House of Representatives from the 17th district from 1999 to 2001.

He died on December 6, 2007, in Parker, South Dakota at age 78.
