= Athletics at the 2024 Summer Olympics – Men's 5000 metres =

Men's 5000 metres at the Games of the XXXIII Olympiad
- Venue: Stade de France, Paris, France
- Dates: 7 August 2024 (heats); 10 August 2024 (final)
- Winning time: 13:13.66

Medalists
1st place, gold medalist(s)		Jakob Ingebrigtsen	Norway
2nd place, silver medalist(s)		Ronald Kwemoi	Kenya
3rd place, bronze medalist(s)		Grant Fisher	United States

The men's 5000 metres at the 2024 Summer Olympics took place at the Stade de France in Paris, France, with the heats on 7 August and the final on 10 August. This event marked the 26th appearance of the men's 5000 metres in Olympic history. A total of 43 athletes qualified for the competition through entry standards or world rankings.

== Summary ==
=== Field overview ===
Defending champion and world record holder Joshua Cheptegei did not participate in the heats. Jakob Ingebrigtsen, the reigning world champion, competed after narrowly missing a medal in the 1500 meters. Ingebrigtsen, known for attempting doubles at major championships, prioritized the 1500 metres but remained a strong contender in the 5000 metres.

From the 2020 Tokyo Olympics, silver medalist Mohammed Ahmed returned, while bronze medalist Paul Chelimo failed to qualify at the U.S. Trials. Other key contenders included Jacob Krop, a 2022 and 2023 World Championship medalist, and world leader Hagos Gebrhiwet, who entered the event in strong form alongside compatriot Yomif Kejelcha. Notably absent was Mohamed Katir, the 2023 World silver medalist, due to a doping-related suspension.

=== Heats ===
The heats aimed to reduce the field to 16 finalists, with the top eight athletes from each of the two semi-finals advancing. Both heats were marred by incidents involving tightly packed runners.

In the first heat, Mohammed Ahmed fell after contact with another athlete and was unable to recover. A chaotic sprint finish led to multiple falls, including Dominic Lobalu, George Mills, Thierry Ndikumwenayo, and Mike Foppen, with some runners narrowly avoiding the pileup. Despite the disruption, Thomas Fafard hurdled fallen athletes to secure a qualifying spot.

The second heat experienced similar issues during the final sprint. Abdi Nur tripped, causing a domino effect that affected other athletes, including Yann Schrub and Birhanu Balew, though Balew managed to finish the race.

=== The final ===
Following protests, the referee and Jury of Appeals advanced several affected athletes, resulting in an expanded final field of 22 competitors. However, Abdi Nur and Mohammed Ahmed did not advance.

The final began with Dominic Lobalu setting the early pace, followed by Thierry Ndikumwenayo. The Ethiopian and Kenyan teams adopted uncharacteristically conservative tactics, with key athletes such as Gebrhiwet and Ronald Kwemoi staying at the back early on. As the pace quickened, Addisu Yihune and Biniam Mehary alternated in leading.

With 600 metres remaining, Gebrhiwet surged to the front, opening a significant gap. Jakob Ingebrigtsen responded, moving past his competitors to take the lead with 200 metres to go. From there, Ingebrigtsen extended his lead and claimed the gold medal by a comfortable margin.

Behind him, Kwemoi secured silver after passing Mehary and Gebrhiwet. In a close sprint for the bronze, Grant Fisher surged late to edge out Lobalu and Gebrhiwet at the finish line.

== Background ==
The men's 5000 m has been present on the Olympic athletics programme since 1912.

Global records before the 2024 Summer Olympics
Record	Athlete (nation)	Time (s)	Location	Date
World record	Joshua Cheptegei (UGA)	12:35.36	Fontvieille, Monaco	14 August 2020
Olympic record	Kenenisa Bekele (ETH)	12:57.82	Beijing, China	23 August 2008
World leading	Hagos Gebrhiwet (ETH)	12:36.73	Oslo, Norway	30 May 2024

Area records before the 2024 Summer Olympics
Area record	Athlete (nation)	Time (s)
Africa (records)	Joshua Cheptegei (UGA)	12:35.36 WR
Asia (records)	Albert Rop (BHR)	12:51.96
Europe (records)	Mohamed Katir (ESP)	12:45.01
North, Central America and Caribbean (records)	Grant Fisher (USA)	12:46.96
Oceania (records)	Craig Mottram (AUS)	12:55.76
South America (records)	Luis Grijalva (GTM)	12:50.58

== Qualification ==
For the men's 5000 metres event, the qualification period was between 1 July 2023 and 30 June 2024. 43 athletes were able to qualify for the event, with a maximum of three athletes per nation, by running the entry standard of 13:05.00 seconds or faster or by their World Athletics Ranking for this event.

== Results ==
=== Round 1 ===
Round 1 was held on 7 August, starting at 11:10 (UTC+2) in the morning.

==== Heat 1 ====
Rank	Athlete	Nation	Time	Notes
1	Narve Gilje Nordås	Norway	14:08.16	Q
2	Hagos Gebrhiwet	Ethiopia	14:08.18	Q
3	John Heymans	Belgium	14:08.33	Q
4	Jacob Krop	Kenya	14:08.73	Q
5	Edwin Kurgat	Kenya	14:08.76	Q
6	Graham Blanks	United States	14:09.06	Q
7	Hugo Hay	France	14:09.22	Q
8	Thomas Fafard	Canada	14:09.37	Q
9	Jimmy Gressier	France	14:09.95	
10	Egide Ntakarutimana	Burundi	14:11.29	
11	Abdi Waiss	Djibouti	14:11.88	
12	Stewart McSweyn	Australia	14:12.31	qJ
13	Patrick Dever	Great Britain	14:13.48	
14	Elzan Bibić	Serbia	14:14.46	
15	Dominic Lobalu	Refugee Olympic Team	14:15.49	qR
16	Mohammed Ahmed	Canada	14:15.76	
17	Aron Kifle	Eritrea	14:16.77	
18	George Mills	Great Britain	14:37.08	qR
19	Mike Foppen	Netherlands	14:37.34	qR
	Thierry Ndikumwenayo	Spain	DNF	qR
	Andreas Almgren	Sweden	DNS	

==== Heat 2 ====
Rank	Athlete	Nation	Time	Notes
1	Jakob Ingebrigtsen	Norway	13:51.59	Q
2	Biniam Mehary	Ethiopia	13:51.82	Q
3	Isaac Kimeli	Belgium	13:52.18	Q
4	Grant Fisher	United States	13:52.44	Q
5	Oscar Chelimo	Uganda	13:52.46	Q
6	Ronald Kwemoi	Kenya	13:52.51	Q
7	Dawit Seare	Eritrea	13:52.53	Q
8	Addisu Yihune	Ethiopia	13:52.62	Q
9	Morgan McDonald	Australia	13:52.67	
10	Birhanu Balew	Bahrain	13:53.11	
11	Yann Schrub	France	13:53.27	qJ
12	Jonas Raess	Switzerland	13:55.04	
13	Brian Fay	Ireland	13:55.35	
14	Santiago Catrofe	Uruguay	13:56.40	
15	Mohamed Ismail Ibrahim	Djibouti	13:57.47	
16	Luis Grijalva	Guatemala	13:58.81	
17	Benjamin Flanagan	Canada	13:59.23	
18	Sam Atkin	Great Britain	14:02.46	
19	Abdihamid Nur	United States	14:15.00	
	Adel Mechaal	Spain	DNS	

=== Final ===
The final was held on 10 August, starting at 20:00 (UTC+2) in the evening.

Rank	Athlete	Nation	Time	Notes
1st place, gold medalist(s)	Jakob Ingebrigtsen	Norway	13:13.66	SB
2nd place, silver medalist(s)	Ronald Kwemoi	Kenya	13:15.04	
3rd place, bronze medalist(s)	Grant Fisher	United States	13:15.13	
4	Dominic Lobalu	Refugee Olympic Team	13:15.27	
5	Hagos Gebrhiwet	Ethiopia	13:15.32	
6	Biniam Mehary	Ethiopia	13:15.99	
7	Edwin Kurgat	Kenya	13:17.18	
8	Isaac Kimeli	Belgium	13:18.10	
9	Graham Blanks	United States	13:18.67	
10	Jacob Krop	Kenya	13:18.68	SB
11	John Heymans	Belgium	13:19.25	
12	Yann Schrub	France	13:20.63	
13	Mike Foppen	Netherlands	13:21.56	
14	Addisu Yihune	Ethiopia	13:22.33	
15	Thierry Ndikumwenayo	Spain	13:24.07	
16	Hugo Hay	France	13:26.71	SB
17	Narve Gilje Nordås	Norway	13:31.34	
18	Stewart McSweyn	Australia	13:31.38	
19	Dawit Seare	Eritrea	13:31.50	
20	Oscar Chelimo	Uganda	13:31.56	
21	George Mills	Great Britain	13:32.32	
22	Thomas Fafard	Canada	13:49.69	
