= Glenn Robinson =

American basketball player (born 1973)

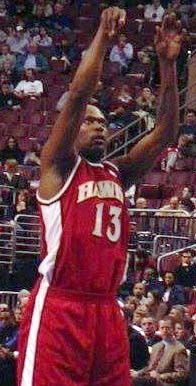
- Robinson with the Atlanta Hawks in 2003

Personal information
- Born: January 10, 1973 (age 53) Gary, Indiana, U.S.
- Listed height: 6 ft 7 in (2.01 m)
- Listed weight: 240 lb (109 kg)

Career information
- High school: Roosevelt (Gary, Indiana)
- College: Purdue (1992–1994)
- NBA draft: 1994: 1st round, 1st overall pick
- Drafted by: Milwaukee Bucks
- Playing career: 1994–2005
- Position: Small forward
- Number: 13, 31, 3

Career history
- 1994–2002: Milwaukee Bucks
- 2002–2003: Atlanta Hawks
- 2003–2005: Philadelphia 76ers
- 2005: San Antonio Spurs

Career highlights
- NBA champion (2005); 2× NBA All-Star (2000, 2001); NBA All-Rookie First Team (1995); National college player of the year (1994); Consensus first-team All-American (1994); Consensus second-team All-American (1993); NCAA scoring champion (1994); Big Ten Player of the Year (1994); 2× First-team All-Big Ten (1993, 1994); Big Ten Athlete of the Year (1994); First-team Parade All-American (1991); McDonald's All-American (1991); Indiana Mr. Basketball (1991)

Career NBA statistics
- Points: 14,234 (20.7 ppg)
- Rebounds: 4,189 (6.1 rpg)
- Assists: 1,879 (2.7 apg)
- Stats at NBA.com
- Stats at Basketball Reference

Glenn Alan Robinson Jr. (born January 10, 1973) is an American former professional basketball player. Nicknamed "Big Dog" and "the Chosen One", he played in the National Basketball Association (NBA) from 1994 to 2005 for the Milwaukee Bucks, Atlanta Hawks, Philadelphia 76ers, and San Antonio Spurs. Robinson attended Purdue University and was the first overall pick in the 1994 NBA draft. He is the father of Glenn Robinson III, who played college basketball at the University of Michigan and has also played in the NBA. His daughter is Jaimie Robinson.

== Early life ==
Robinson was born to Christine Bridgeman in Gary, Indiana. With his mother being an unmarried teenager, Robinson rarely saw his father. Not receiving the best grades at school, his mother once pulled him off the basketball team, and he took a job at an air-conditioning and refrigeration shop.

== High school career ==
Robinson attended Theodore Roosevelt High School in Gary, where he started playing organized basketball during the 9th grade. He was a member of three IHSAA Sectional title teams, two Regional title teams and a State Championship team. During his senior season (1990–91), he led the Panthers to an Indiana state basketball championship, winning the final game against Brebeuf Jesuit and their star Alan Henderson; this highly anticipated showdown was captured in The Road to Indianapolis. and Indiana High School Basketball 20 Most Dominant Players. Robinson won the 1991 Indiana Mr. Basketball award, the oldest such award in the nation (inaugurated in 1939). He was selected as a McDonald's All-American and along with Chris Webber was one of the MVPs of the Dapper Dan Roundball classic.

== College career ==
=== 1991–1993 ===
After high school, Robinson attended Purdue University to play under head coach Gene Keady and his recruiter/assistant coach Frank Kendrick. A school custodian gave him the nickname of "Big Dog" before he played a game for Purdue. Robinson subsequently got a tattoo of a "snarling bulldog wearing a spiked collar" on his chest.

Due to struggles with NCAA eligibility, resulting from Proposition 48 which requires minimum academic standards, he had to redshirt for his freshman season. He worked as a welder during the summers while at Purdue.

Eligible for his sophomore season, Robinson led the Boilermakers with 24.1 points and 9.4 rebounds a game in his first season as a Boilermaker. He led them to an 18–10 record in the regular season and an NCAA tournament appearance. He received First Team All-Big Ten and Second Team All-American honors.

=== 1993–1994 ===
In his junior season, Robinson built upon his previous season's averages with 30.3 points and 11.2 rebounds a game, while becoming the first player since 1978 to lead the Big Ten Conference in both categories. Along with teammates Cuonzo Martin and Matt Waddell, he led the Boilermakers to a Big Ten Conference Title and an Elite Eight appearance, finishing the season with a 29–5 record and a 3rd overall ranking. In his last college game against a Grant Hill-led Duke team in the NCAA Tournament, Robinson was held to only 13 points, his season low, while suffering from a back strain he sustained against Kansas in the prior game. Leading the nation in scoring and becoming the conference's all-time single season points leader with 1,030 points, Robinson was unanimously selected as the Big Ten Conference Player of the Year. He also unanimously received the John R. Wooden Award and Naismith Award, the first national player of the year-honored Boilermaker since John Wooden himself did it in 1932 (who also wore the jersey #13). Robinson also was the recipient for the USBWA College Player of the Year.

=== College notes ===
Robinson left Purdue after becoming the only Boilermaker to have more than 1,000 points, 500 rebounds, 100 steals, 100 assists and 50 blocked shots in a career during his two seasons at Purdue, along with a school weightlifting record with a 309-pound clean-and-jerk. His 1,030 points during his junior year made him only the 15th player in college history to score 1,000 points in a season. In September 2010, the Big Ten Network named Robinson Icon No. 35 on its list of the biggest icons in Big Ten Conference history.

Purdue's campus bookstores sold T-shirts featuring Robinson's image and his nickname "Big Dog" before Robinson complained and they discontinued the practice.

== Professional career ==
=== Milwaukee Bucks (1994–2002) ===
Robinson was selected by the Milwaukee Bucks with the first overall pick in the 1994 NBA draft, the first Boilermaker to be selected as the first pick since Joe Barry Carroll in 1980.

At the draft, Robinson wore a gold suit and black alligator slip-ons. Before he could take the court, he and the Bucks became involved in a contract holdout that lasted until the beginning of training camp after it was rumored that he desired a 13-year, $100 million contract. Robinson eventually signed a rookie-record 10-year, $68 million deal that still stands as the richest NBA rookie contract. Within months of his executed contract, the NBA moved to implement a rookie wage scale starting with the 1995 season, likely in direct response to the deal.

During his first year in the NBA, Robinson was twice named the Schick NBA Rookie of the Month and was named to the NBA All-Rookie First Team after leading all rookies with an average of 21.9 points per game. Robinson finished third in Rookie of the Year voting behind Grant Hill and Jason Kidd, who shared the award, but was named Rookie Of The Year by Basketball Digest magazine.

While playing for the Milwaukee Bucks, Robinson recorded some of the best statistical seasons in franchise history. Early in his career, Robinson shared the frontcourt with teammate and All-Star Vin Baker. On December 7, 1996, Robinson scored 44 points on 70% shooting, alongside 7 rebounds and 6 assists, in a 126–118 victory over the Washington Bullets. Despite another strong statistical season from Robinson, the Bucks would again fail make the NBA playoffs.

After several trades, one of which had Baker go to Seattle, Robinson teamed with Ray Allen and Sam Cassell, and helped lead the Bucks to several postseason appearances. On May 11, 1999, Robinson scored 23 points and grabbed 12 rebounds in a narrow 108–107 playoff loss against Reggie Miller and the Indiana Pacers. The underexperienced Bucks (was both Robinson's and Allen's first postseason appearance) would eventually lose the series. On January 29, 2001, Robinson scored 25 points, grabbed 10 rebounds, and recorded 5 steals in a 99–96 loss against the Minnesota Timberwolves. On February 25, 2001, Robinson scored a career-high 45 points in a 122–95 win against the Golden State Warriors. That season, Robinson and the Bucks would reach the 2001 Eastern Conference Finals, losing to the Philadelphia 76ers in a 7-game series. In the final game of that series, Robinson scored 24 points, grabbed 7 rebounds, and recorded 4 assists in a losing effort. It would be the closest the Bucks would get to the finals until 2019, when another Bucks Forward, Giannis Antetokounmpo, helped end their 18-year conference finals drought.

Robinson was the second place all-time leading scorer in Milwaukee Bucks history, only trailing Kareem Abdul-Jabbar until he was later surpassed by Giannis Antetokounmpo. Robinson averaged at least 20 points per game in seven of his eight seasons in Milwaukee. He made back-to-back NBA All-Star Team appearances in 2000 and 2001.

=== Atlanta Hawks (2002–2003) ===
Robinson was traded by Milwaukee to the Atlanta Hawks for Toni Kukoč, Leon Smith, and a 2003 first-round pick on August 2, 2002. In Robinson's debut as a Hawk in the season opener, he scored 34 points, had 10 rebounds and 8 assists against the New Jersey Nets. During the 2002–03 season, he averaged 20.8 points a game and shot a personal-best 87.6 percent from the free throw line.

=== Philadelphia 76ers (2003–2005) ===
After a year in Atlanta, he was traded on July 23, 2003, with a 2006 second-round pick to the Philadelphia 76ers in a four-team deal. In his tenth overall and only season playing with the Sixers, Robinson averaged 16.6 points and 1 steal per game as second scoring option to teammate, Allen Iverson. After his year in Philadelphia during the 2003–04 season, Robinson did not play a game for the 76ers in 2004–05, largely due to an injury. On February 24, 2005, he was traded to the New Orleans Hornets in exchange for forwards Rodney Rogers and Jamal Mashburn. Robinson was waived by the team almost immediately and never suited up for them.

=== San Antonio Spurs (2005) ===
Robinson signed with the San Antonio Spurs on April 4, 2005, to establish an additional veteran shooting presence as the team prepared for the playoffs. As a role player in the 2005 playoffs, Robinson helped the Spurs win the championship. The games in the NBA Finals would be Robinson's last in the NBA, capping off his 11-year career with a title.

Robinson was forced to retire due to injuries, particularly to his knees. He finished his career with 14,234 career points, averaging 20.7 points, 6.1 rebounds, 2.7 assists, and 1.2 steals per game, also playing in two league all-star games.

== NBA career statistics ==
Legend
GP	Games played	GS	Games started	MPG	Minutes per game
FG%	Field goal percentage	3P%	3-point field goal percentage	FT%	Free throw percentage
RPG	Rebounds per game	APG	Assists per game	SPG	Steals per game
BPG	Blocks per game	PPG	Points per game	**Bold**	Career high
†	Won an NBA championship	*	Led the league

=== Regular season ===
Year	Team	GP	GS	MPG	FG%	3P%	FT%	RPG	APG	SPG	BPG	PPG
1994–95	Milwaukee	80	76	37.0	.451	.321	.796	6.4	2.5	1.4	.3	21.9
1995–96	Milwaukee	**82**	**82***	39.6	.454	.342	.812	6.1	**3.6**	1.2	.5	20.2
1996–97	Milwaukee	80	79	38.9	.465	.350	.791	6.3	3.1	1.3	**.9**	21.1
1997–98	Milwaukee	56	56	**41.0**	.470	.385	.808	5.5	2.8	1.2	.6	**23.4**
1998–99	Milwaukee	47	47	33.6	.459	**.392**	.870	5.9	2.1	1.0	**.9**	18.4
1999–00	Milwaukee	81	81	35.9	**.472**	.363	.802	6.0	2.4	1.0	.5	20.9
2000–01	Milwaukee	76	74	37.0	.468	.299	.820	**6.9**	3.3	1.1	.8	22.0
2001–02	Milwaukee	66	63	35.5	.467	.326	.837	6.2	2.5	**1.5**	.6	20.7
2002–03	Atlanta	69	68	37.6	.432	.342	**.876**	6.6	3.0	1.3	.4	20.8
2003–04	Philadelphia	42	42	31.8	.448	.340	.832	4.5	1.4	1.0	.2	16.6
2004–05†	San Antonio	9	0	17.4	.442	.333	.870	2.7	.9	.4	.3	10.0
Career		688	668	36.8	.459	.340	.820	6.1	2.7	1.2	.6	20.7
All-Star		2	0	12.5	.529	—	—	5.0	.5	.5	.5	9.0

=== Playoffs ===
Year	Team	GP	GS	MPG	FG%	3P%	FT%	RPG	APG	SPG	BPG	PPG
1999	Milwaukee	3	3	**39.3**	.412	**.500**	.889	**8.3**	1.7	1.0	.7	**20.7**
2000	Milwaukee	5	5	34.8	.405	.286	.846	4.2	2.6	**1.6**	.8	15.4
2001	Milwaukee	**18**	**18**	38.2	**.429**	.387	**.893**	6.4	**3.3**	.6	**1.3**	19.4
2005†	San Antonio	13	0	8.7	.356	.300	.882	1.6	.1	.2	.5	3.8
Career		39	26	28.0	.416	.379	.885	4.7	2.0	.6	.9	13.8

== National team career ==
Robinson was selected for the 1996 U.S. Olympic basketball team, but was unable to play because of injury. He was replaced by Gary Payton.

== Personal life ==
His oldest son, Glenn III, played basketball for the University of Michigan and started for the national runner-up 2012–13 team. Following the 2012–13 Big Ten season he was an honorable mention All-conference selection and All-freshman honoree by the coaches. Glenn III was the NBA Slam Dunk Contest champion in 2017 when he was with the Indiana Pacers and most recently played for the Sacramento Kings.

His younger son, Gelen (class of 2014), is the 2013 Indiana High School Athletic Association (IHSAA) 220-pound (100 kg) wrestling champion, the 2013 IHSAA shot put runner-up, the 2013 IHSAA discus runner-up, and a repeat (2012 and 2013) winner of The Times of Northwest Indiana Football Defensive Player of the Year and as a result the 2012–13 Times of Northwest Indiana Athlete of the Year. Gelen played for the Purdue University football team and signed with the CFL BC Lions in 2018. He played rugby for the LA Giltinis of Major League Rugby (MLR). Gelen currently plays Defensive Tackle for the XFL's St. Louis Battlehawks.

Robinson also has a daughter named Jaimie who competes in track and field, As a freshman, she was 2014 Class 2A Illinois High School Association (IHSA) runner-up in the triple jump for De La Salle Institute. As a sophomore, she was the 2015 Class 2A IHSA state champion in the triple jump De La Salle, setting the IHSA Class 2A record at 40 ft 0 in (12.19 m). As a senior, she was 3-time 2017 IHSA Class 3A state champion in the triple jump, long jump, and 200 metres for Homewood-Flossmoor High School, setting the Class 3A state record in the triple jump at 42 ft 8.5 in (13.02 m). She ran track in college for Alabama Crimson Tide (2018), Oregon Ducks (2019–21) and Ohio State Buckeyes (2022–23), earning Big Ten Indoor and Outdoor Championship triple jump championships in 2022 and Big Ten Indoor and Outdoor Championship triple jump runner up finishes in 2023, as well as the Ohio State Outdoor Triple Jump school record.

Robinson has another son, Gicarri Harris, a college basketball player who joined the Purdue University Boilermakers for the 2024-25 season.

On May 16, 2003, Robinson was convicted in Cook County, Illinois of domestic battery and assault charges involving his former fiancé on July 20, 2002, in her Chicago Heights home.

Awards and achievements
Preceded by Damon Bailey	Indiana Mr. Basketball award 1991	Succeeded by Charles Macon
