= Avery Ellis =

American gridiron football player (born 1994)

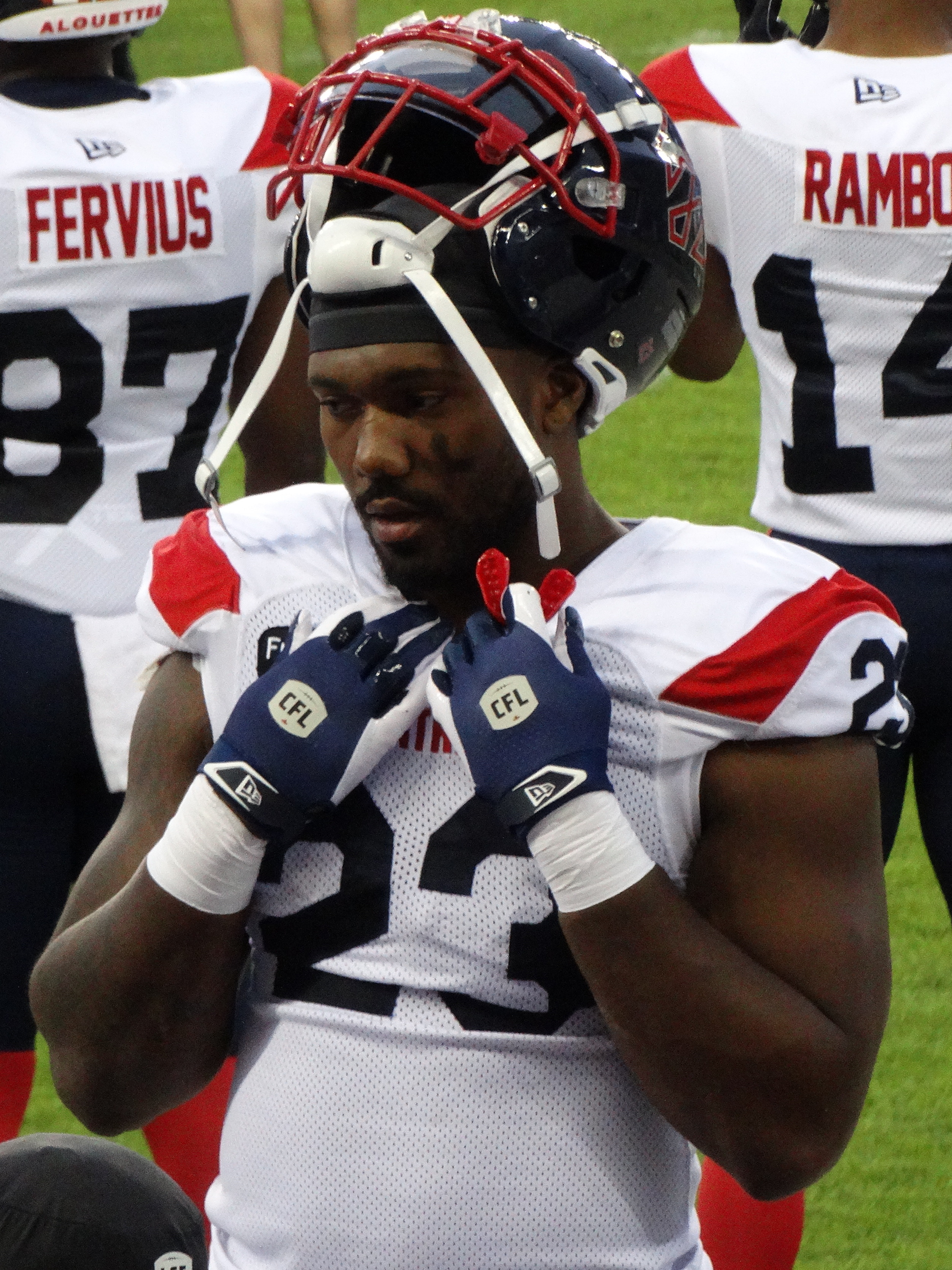
- Ellis with the Montreal Alouettes in 2024

Profile
- Position: Defensive lineman

Personal information
- Born: October 3, 1994 (age 32); Newark, New Jersey, U.S.
- Listed height: 6 ft 2 in (1.88 m)
- Listed weight: 250 lb (113 kg)

Career information
- High school: Montclair High
- University: Temple

Career history
- 2017–2021: Ottawa Redblacks
- 2022: Montreal Alouettes
- 2022: Edmonton Elks
- 2023–2024: Montreal Alouettes

Awards and highlights
- Grey Cup champion (2023)
- Stats at CFL.ca

Avery Malcolm Ellis (born October 3, 1994) is an American professional football defensive lineman who is a free agent. He most recently played for the Montreal Alouettes of the Canadian Football League (CFL).

== College career ==
Ellis played college football for the Temple Owls from 2012 to 2016.

== Professional career ==
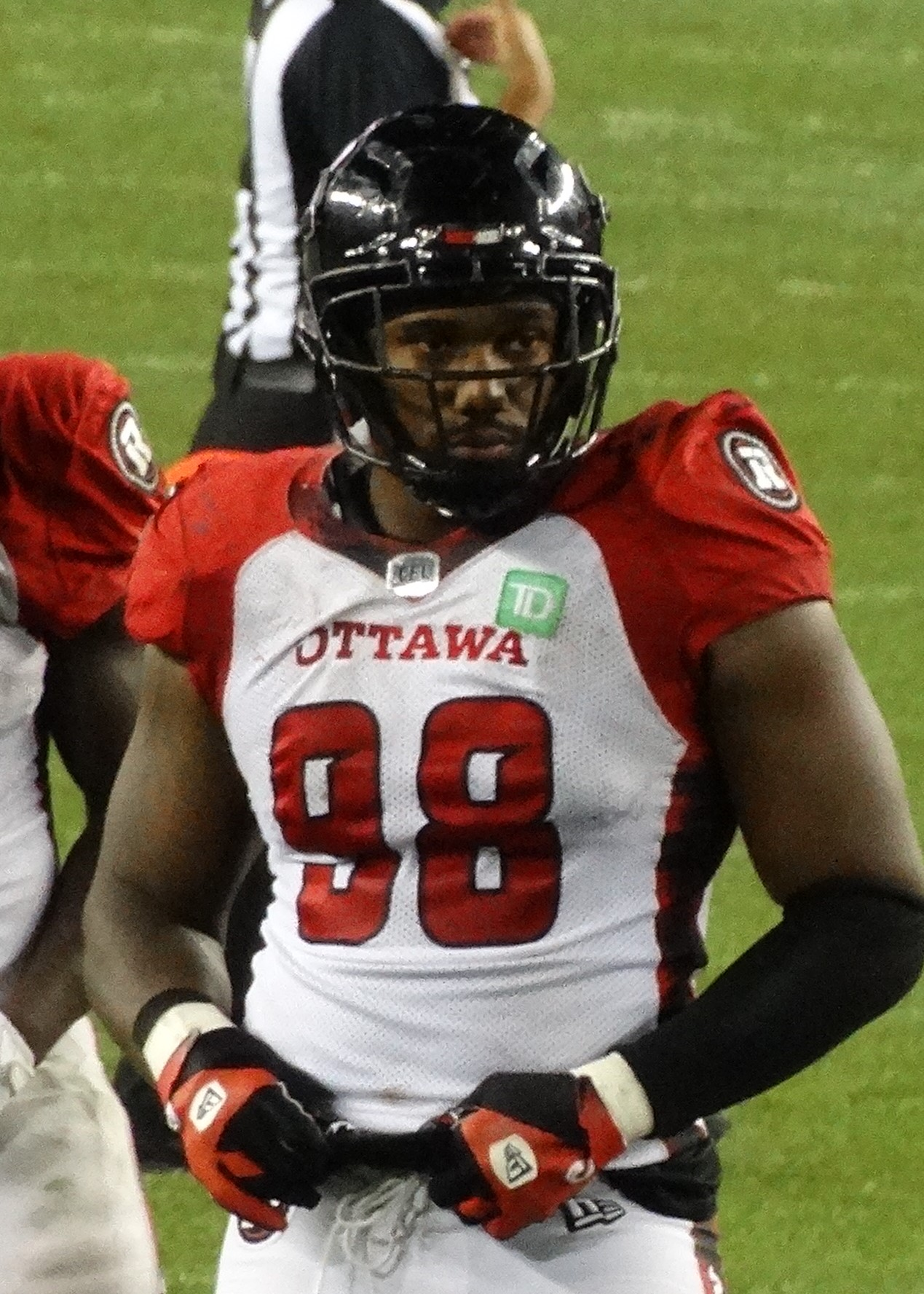
Ellis with the Ottawa Redblacks in 2021

=== Ottawa Redblacks ===
Following his collegiate career, Ellis signed with the Ottawa Redblacks on May 8, 2017. He played in his first professional game on July 8, 2017, against the Toronto Argonauts, where he recorded two tackles, one sack, and one special teams tackle. He scored his first career touchdown on August 18, 2017, in a game against the Hamilton Tiger-Cats when he returned a fumble 30 yards for the score. In 2017, he played in 16 regular season games where he made 28 defensive tackles and six sacks.

Ellis played in the first six games of the 2018 season, before suffering an injury in the July 28 game against the Tiger-Cats. He returned for the last three games of the regular season and totalled 15 defensive tackles and three sacks in those nine games. Following an East Final victory against the Tiger-Cats, Ellis played in his first Grey Cup game where he recorded three tackles. However, the Redblacks lost the 106th Grey Cup championship to the Calgary Stampeders.

In 2019, Ellis played in all 18 regular season games and led the team with 54 defensive tackles and tied for the team lead with seven sacks. He did not play in 2020 due to the cancellation of the 2020 CFL season and he re-signed with the Redblacks on January 15, 2021. He became a free agent upon the expiry of his contract on February 8, 2022.

=== Montreal Alouettes (first stint) ===
On February 8, 2022, it was announced that Ellis had signed with the Montreal Alouettes. He played in nine games where he had 17 defensive tackles and three sacks.

=== Edmonton Elks ===
On August 31, 2022, the Edmonton Elks acquired Ellis and a third-round pick in the 2023 CFL draft from the Montreal Alouettes in exchange for Thomas Costigan and Nafees Lyon. He played in seven games where he had 16 defensive tackles, three sacks, and one forced fumble. He was released on May 4, 2023.

=== Montreal Alouettes (second stint) ===
On May 28, 2023, Ellis signed again with the Alouettes. He played in 13 regular season games in 2023 where he had nine defensive tackles, one special teams tackle, and one sack. He also played in all three post-season games, including the team's victory over the Winnipeg Blue Bombers in the 110th Grey Cup.

In 2024, Ellis played in all 18 regular season games and recorded 17 defensive tackles, five special teams tackles, and two sacks. He became a free agent upon the expiry of his contract on February 11, 2025.

== Personal life ==
Ellis was born in Newark, New Jersey, to parents Lisa Hunter and Byron Ellis, and raised in Montclair, New Jersey, where he attended Montclair High School. He has three younger sisters.
