= Nafees Lyon =

American gridiron football player (born 1996)

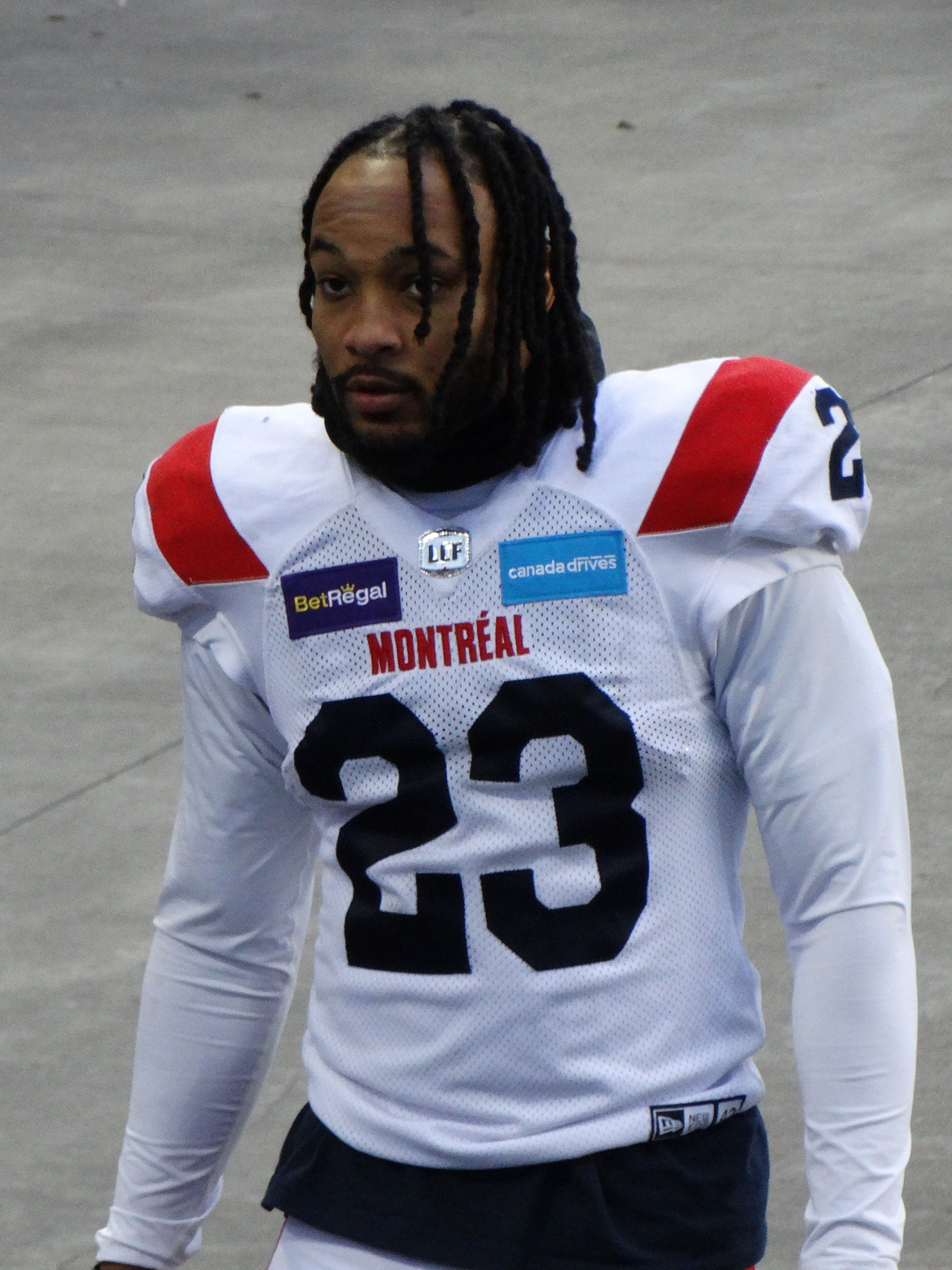
- Lyon with the Montreal Alouettes in 2022

Profile
- Position: Defensive back

Personal information
- Born: December 10, 1996 (age 29); Charlotte, North Carolina, U.S.
- Listed height: 5 ft 10 in (1.78 m)
- Listed weight: 184 lb (83 kg)

Career information
- High school: Mallard Creek (Charlotte)
- College: Charlotte

Career history
- 2021–2022: Edmonton Elks
- 2022–2024: Montreal Alouettes
- 2025: Ottawa Redblacks*
- 2025: Saskatchewan Roughriders
- * Offseason or practice squad member only

Awards and highlights
- 2× Grey Cup champion (2023, 2025)
- Stats at CFL.ca

Nafees Lyon (born December 10, 1996) is an American professional football defensive back.

== High School and College ==
Lyon attended Mallard Creek High School in Charlotte, North Carolina. He was a member of the football team, and part of two North Carolina 4AA state champion teams in 2013 and 2014.

He committed to the Charlotte 49ers football team for college. Lyon used a redshirt season his first year in college in 2015. He then played from 2016 to 2020, missing the 2017 season due to injury. He played in 40 games in four seasons where he recorded 137 total tackles, two interceptions, and two forced fumbles.

== Professional career ==
=== Edmonton Elks ===
Lyon signed with the Edmonton Elks on January 11, 2021. He began the 2021 season on the practice roster, but he made his professional debut on October 29, 2021, against the Hamilton Tiger-Cats where he had six defensive tackles. He played and started in the five regular season games where he had 27 defensive tackles and two interceptions.

In 2022, he played in eight regular season games for the Elks where he had 25 defensive tackles, one sack, one interception, and one forced fumble.

=== Montreal Alouettes ===
On August 31, 2022, Lyon was traded to the Montreal Alouettes along with Thomas Costigan in exchange for Avery Ellis and a third-round pick in the 2023 CFL draft. In his first game as an Alouette, on September 9, 2022, he scored his first career touchdown on a 52-yard interception return against the BC Lions. He played in six regular season games for the Alouettes where he had 27 defensive tackles, one special teams tackle, one interception, and one touchdown.

=== Ottawa Redblacks ===
Lyon signed with the Ottawa Redblacks on February 11, 2025. However, he was released prior to the start of 2025 training camp on May 2, 2025.

=== Saskatchewan Roughriders ===
On October 6, 2025, it was announced that Lyon had signed with the Saskatchewan Roughriders.

On May 13, 2026, Lyon was released by the Roughriders.

== Personal life ==
Lyon was born to parents Tobin and Belinda Lyon and has one brother, Tobin II.
