= Jaimie Robinson =

American triple jumper and track coach

Personal information
- Nationality: American
- Born: May 26, 1999 (age 27) Flossmoor, Illinois, U.S.

Sport
- Sport: Track and field
- Event: Triple jump
- College team: Alabama Crimson Tide (2018); Oregon Ducks (2020–2021); Ohio State Buckeyes (2022–2023)

Achievements and titles
- Personal best(s): Triple jump (outdoor): 13.60 m (44 ft 7 1/4 in) (Bloomington 2022); Triple jump (indoor): 13.37 m (43 ft 10 1/4 in) (Albuquerque 2023)
Medal record
Women's track and field
Representing the United States
Pan American Junior Championships
Silver medal – second place	2017 Trujillo	Triple jump

Jaimie Robinson (born May 26, 1999) is an American track and field coach and former triple jump specialist. She is an assistant coach for the Illinois Fighting Illini track and field team. As an athlete, she was a four-time Illinois High School Association (IHSA) state champion, a two-time Big Ten Conference champion, and a silver medalist at the 2017 Pan American U20 Athletics Championships.

== Early life and family ==
Robinson was raised in Flossmoor, Illinois. She belongs to a prominent athletic family with multiple ties to the Big Ten Conference and the National Basketball Association (NBA).

- Her father, Glenn Robinson, was the first overall pick in the 1994 NBA draft, a two-time NBA All-Star, and won an NBA championship in 2005. He was also named the NCAA national player of the year and Big Ten Athlete of the Year at Purdue University.
- Her brother, Glenn Robinson III, played nine seasons in the NBA and won the 2017 NBA Slam Dunk Contest after playing collegiately for the Michigan Wolverines.
- Her brother, Gelen Robinson, was a three-time Indiana High School Athletic Association state champion (twice in wrestling and once in the discus throw) before becoming an All-Big Ten defensive lineman for the Purdue Boilermakers.

Robinson later joined her father and brothers in earning All-Big Ten honors during her own collegiate career.

== Athletic career ==
=== Prep career ===
Robinson began her high school career at De La Salle Institute in Chicago. As a freshman in 2014, she was the IHSA Class 2A state runner-up in the triple jump. The following year, she won the 2015 Class 2A state title in the event, setting a class record of 40 ft 0 in (12.19 m).

After transferring to Homewood-Flossmoor High School, she had a dominant senior season in 2017. She won three Class 3A state titles in a single weekend—the triple jump, long jump, and 200-meter dash—scoring 36 of her team's 43 total points to secure a runner-up team finish. Her winning triple jump of 42 ft 8.5 in (13.02 m) set an Illinois all-class state record. In the summer of 2017, she won the triple jump at the U.S. Junior Championships in Sacramento, California, which qualified her for the 2017 Pan American U20 Athletics Championships in Trujillo, Peru, where she won the silver medal.

=== Collegiate career ===
Robinson competed for three different major programs during her collegiate career:

- Alabama (2018): She began her career with the Alabama Crimson Tide, earning SEC All-Freshman honors indoors and qualifying for the 2018 NCAA Outdoor Championships, where she placed 20th.
- Oregon (2020–2021): After transferring to the Oregon Ducks, she placed fifth in the triple jump at the 2021 Pac-12 Conference Track and Field Championships.
- Ohio State (2022–2023): Robinson saw her greatest collegiate success with the Ohio State Buckeyes. In 2022, she won both the Indoor and Outdoor Big Ten triple jump titles and won the Penn Relays college championship. She repeated as the Penn Relays champion in 2023 and finished as the Big Ten runner-up both indoors and outdoors. She concluded her collegiate career by placing 9th at the 2023 NCAA Outdoor Championships, earning the fourth USTFCCCA Second-Team All-American honor of her career. She left Ohio State as the program's school record holder in the outdoor triple jump.

== Coaching career ==
Prior to the 2025–2026 athletic calendar, the University of Illinois Director of Track, Field, and Cross Country, Petros Kyprianou, announced the hiring of Robinson as an assistant coach for the Fighting Illini. She primarily oversees the jumps and combined events crews.

== History ==
=== High school ===
Robinson is an athlete in track and field. As a freshman, she was 2014 Class 2A Illinois High School Association (IHSA) runner-up in the triple jump for De La Salle Institute. As a sophomore, she was the 2015 Class 2A IHSA state champion in the triple jump De La Salle, setting the IHSA Class 2A record at 40 ft 0 in (12.19 m). As a senior, she was 3-time 2017 IHSA Class 3A state champion in the triple jump, long jump, and 200 metres for Homewood-Flossmoor High School, setting the Class 3A state record in the triple jump at 42 ft 8.5 in (13.02 m).

=== College ===
Robinson ran track in college for the Alabama Crimson Tide (2018), Oregon Ducks (2020–21) and Ohio State Buckeyes (2022–23), earning Big Ten Indoor and Outdoor Championship triple jump championships in 2022 and Big Ten Indoor and Outdoor Championship triple jump runner up finishes in 2023, as well as the Ohio State Outdoor Triple Jump school record. Robinson won the 2022 Penn Relays college championship in triple jump with a jump of 13.44 metres (44 ft 1.13 in) and she also won the 2023 Penn Relays college championship in triple jump with a jump of 13.16 metres (43 ft 2 in).

Robinson was a 5x All-Big Ten honoree (2x first team 2022 indoor and outdoor, 2x second team 2023 indoor and outdoor, academic 2023).

At the NCAA Division I Women's Outdoor Track and Field Championships she placed 20th (2018, 12.87), 12th (2022, 13.14) and 9th (2023, 13.50) in her last collegiate season . At the NCAA Division I Women's Indoor Track and Field Championships, she placed 13th (2023, 13.37). Robinson was also named a four-time U. S. Track & Field and Cross Country Coaches Association second team All-American.

== Coaching ==
Robinson became a 2025–26 jumps coach for the Illinois Fighting Illini track and field.
