= Glenn Robinson III =

American basketball player (born 1994)

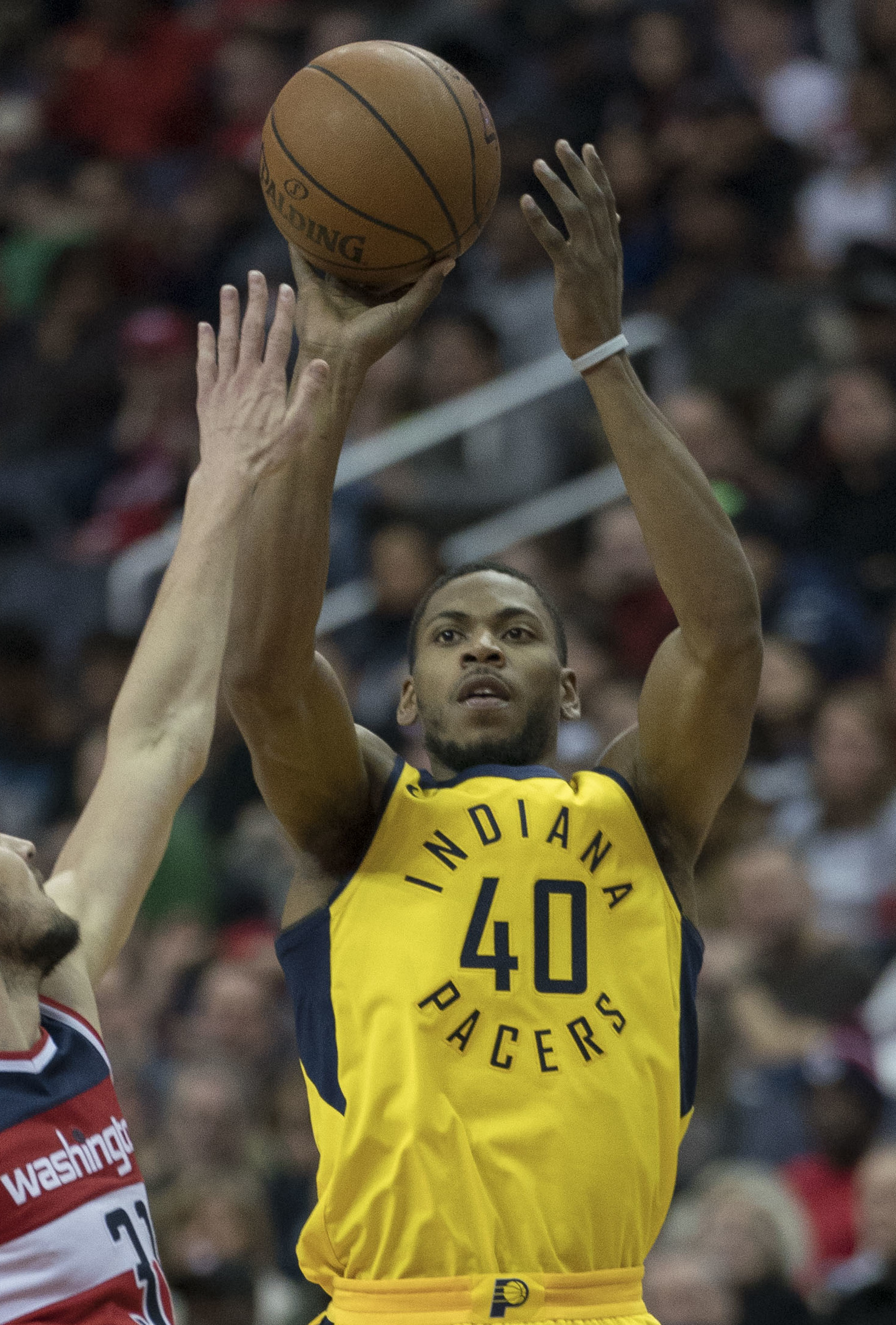
- Robinson with the Indiana Pacers in 2018

No. 22 – Sharjah
- Position: Small forward / shooting guard
- League: UAE National Basketball League

Personal information
- Born: January 8, 1994 (age 32) Gary, Indiana, U.S.
- Listed height: 6 ft 6 in (1.98 m)
- Listed weight: 220 lb (100 kg)

Career information
- High school: Lake Central (St. John, Indiana)
- College: Michigan (2012–2014)
- NBA draft: 2014: 2nd round, 40th overall pick
- Drafted by: Minnesota Timberwolves
- Playing career: 2014–present

Career history
- 2014–2015: Minnesota Timberwolves
- 2015: Philadelphia 76ers
- 2015–2018: Indiana Pacers
- 2015, 2018: →Fort Wayne Mad Ants
- 2018–2019: Detroit Pistons
- 2019–2020: Golden State Warriors
- 2020: Philadelphia 76ers
- 2020–2021: Sacramento Kings
- 2023–2024: Wisconsin Herd
- 2024: Magnolia Hotshots
- 2025: Seoul Samsung Thunders
- 2025–present: Sharjah SC

Career highlights
- NBA Slam Dunk Contest champion (2017); Big Ten All-Freshman team (2013)
- Stats at NBA.com
- Stats at Basketball Reference

Glenn Alann ‘Tre’ Robinson III (born January 8, 1994) is an American professional basketball player for Sharjah SC of the UAE National Basketball League. He was drafted 40th overall by the Minnesota Timberwolves in the 2014 NBA draft. He played nine seasons in the National Basketball Association (NBA) for the Timberwolves, Philadelphia 76ers, Indiana Pacers, Detroit Pistons, Golden State Warriors and Sacramento Kings. Robinson won the NBA Slam Dunk Contest in 2017.

He played college basketball for the Michigan Wolverines, where he was an All-Freshman team honoree in during the 2012–13 Big Ten Conference men's basketball season for the 2012–13 Michigan Wolverines team that finished as national runner-up in the 2013 NCAA Division I men's basketball tournament. He returned to play for the 2013–14 Big Ten Conference men's basketball season champion 2013–14 Wolverines before departing for the NBA.

Robinson was an all-state high school basketball player for Lake Central High School in St. John, Indiana. He is the son of Glenn Robinson, the 1994 first overall NBA draft pick. Two of his siblings were multiple time state champions in high school in individual events.

== Early life ==
Robinson was prematurely born to his mother, Shantelle Clay, at Methodist Hospital in Gary, Indiana. He spent his first two months in an incubator, until he was about 6 pounds (2.7 kg). He was raised by his mother and maternal grandmother. By age three, he was a participant in the Hammond, Indiana YMCA children's basketball league. At age 5 he played in a Boys & Girls Clubs of America basketball league.

Growing up, Robinson had special NBA experiences. On January 2, 1998, when his father and Michael Jordan each scored 44 points against each other at the United Center, he and his brother Gelen were in the front row. When his father played for the Milwaukee Bucks, Robinson remembers being kicked off the court by head coach George Karl. During a meeting in the Philadelphia 76ers locker room with Allen Iverson, Iverson referred to him as "Shorty", and the younger Robinson noted that he was as tall as Iverson, saying "Man, I’m your height right now! Who are you calling shorty?"

Robinson attended Grimmer Middle School in Schererville, Indiana prior to attending Lake Central High School in St. John, Indiana. He stood at 5 feet 6 inches (1.68 m) in seventh grade and 6 feet 1 inch (1.85 m) two years later as a freshman. Robinson was nearly 6 feet 4 inches (1.93 m) during his sophomore season and stood at more than 6 feet 5.5 inches (1.97 m) as a junior.

== High school career ==
As a freshman, he played junior varsity for Lake Central. At the time, his father lived in Atlanta, and Robinson grew up with his mother, Shantelle Clay-Irving alongside his younger brother Gelen. During the summer between his freshman and sophomore season, he came under the wing of two substitute father figures: Dave Milausnic, Lake Central Varsity Basketball head coach, and Wayne Brumm, AAU SYF Players under-17 coach. Milausnic convinced Robinson to come to the gym for early morning workouts, often waking Robinson at his home. Brumm, who would continue to mentor Robinson as a collegian, advised him to hire a personal trainer named Andrew Wallen, who helped Robinson augment his vertical leap. He also helped Robinson bulk up from 167 pounds (76 kg) prior to his sophomore year to 210 pounds (95 kg) in two years.

As a sophomore, he was a first-team all-area selection after leading Lake Central in scoring. On September 14, 2010, Robinson became the first verbal commitment to the Michigan Wolverines men's basketball class of 2012. At the time, he had scholarship offers from Colorado, Valparaiso, Missouri State, IUPUI and Indiana State, and Rivals.com rated him as the 118th-best player in the class of 2012. On February 5, 2011, Robinson posted his career-high 39 points against East Chicago Central High School on 14-for-19 shooting. In the 2011 Indiana sectional against Munster High School, Robinson scored 31 points in an overtime 54–53 loss.

Robinson and Mitch McGary had been friends for years prior to their Michigan affiliation. By the time McGary committed to Michigan in November 2011, Robinson had moved up to the national no. 34 player ranking, per Rivals.com. The pair, along with Nik Stauskas, gave Michigan a consensus top 10 entering class for its 2012 campaign. Robinson visited Michigan along with future teammate Stauskas to see the 61–56 New Year's Day 2012 victory by the 2011–12 Wolverines team over Minnesota. Robinson blossomed as a senior in 2012. In January 2012, he led Lake Central to a 71–47 win over North Carolina-bound J. P. Tokoto's Menomonee Falls High School at the Brandon Jennings Invitational in Milwaukee. Robinson earned most valuable player (MVP) honors with 33 points, while Tokoto posted 28. Robinson led Lake Central to its first sectional championship since 1997 with a 24-point performance in the team's 63–37 victory over Highland High School. The road to the sectional title included a 66–56 rematch victory over Munster. Despite his ascent in the national player rankings, Robinson never received an offer from either Purdue or Indiana.

Following the season, Robinson was invited to participate in the four-team All-American Championship along with future teammate McGary in New Orleans on April 1, 2012. He posted 16 points and 4 rebounds to earn the ESPNHS All-American Championship game MVP. He was named the 2012 Post-Tribune boys' basketball player of the year. By the end of his senior year, Robinson was considered a five-star player by Rivals.com. Robinson was an honor roll student at Lake Central. He placed fourth in the Indiana Mr. Basketball voting behind Gary Harris, Yogi Ferrell and Kellen Dunham. Robinson was a second-team Associated Press all-state selection. His late rise offset a late fall by McGary and enabled Michigan to retain its top-ten class status.

College recruiting
Name	Hometown	School	Height	Weight	Commit date
Glenn Robinson III; SF	St. John, IN	Lake Central High School (IN)	6 ft 7 in (2.01 m)	198.5 lb (90.0 kg)	Jul 13, 2011
Glenn Robinson III; SF	Recruit ratings: Scout: Rivals: (97)				
Overall recruit ranking: Scout: 29, 8 (SF) Rivals: 11, 2 (SF) ESPN: 18, 5 (SF), 2 (IN)
Note: In many cases, Scout, Rivals, 247Sports, On3, and ESPN may conflict in their listings of height and weight.; In these cases, the average was taken. ESPN grades are on a 100-point scale.; Sources: "Michigan 2012 Basketball Commitments". Rivals.; "2012 Michigan Basketball Commits". Scout.; "ESPN". ESPN.; "Scout.com Team Recruiting Rankings". Scout.; "2012 Team Ranking". Rivals.

== College career ==
The 2011–12 Michigan Wolverines men's basketball team had been co-champions of 2011–12 Big Ten Conference, but lost both of its co-captains, Zack Novak and Stu Douglass, to graduation. The team also lost three players as transfers. The team was returning a nucleus of All-Big Ten players Trey Burke and Tim Hardaway Jr.

=== Freshman season ===
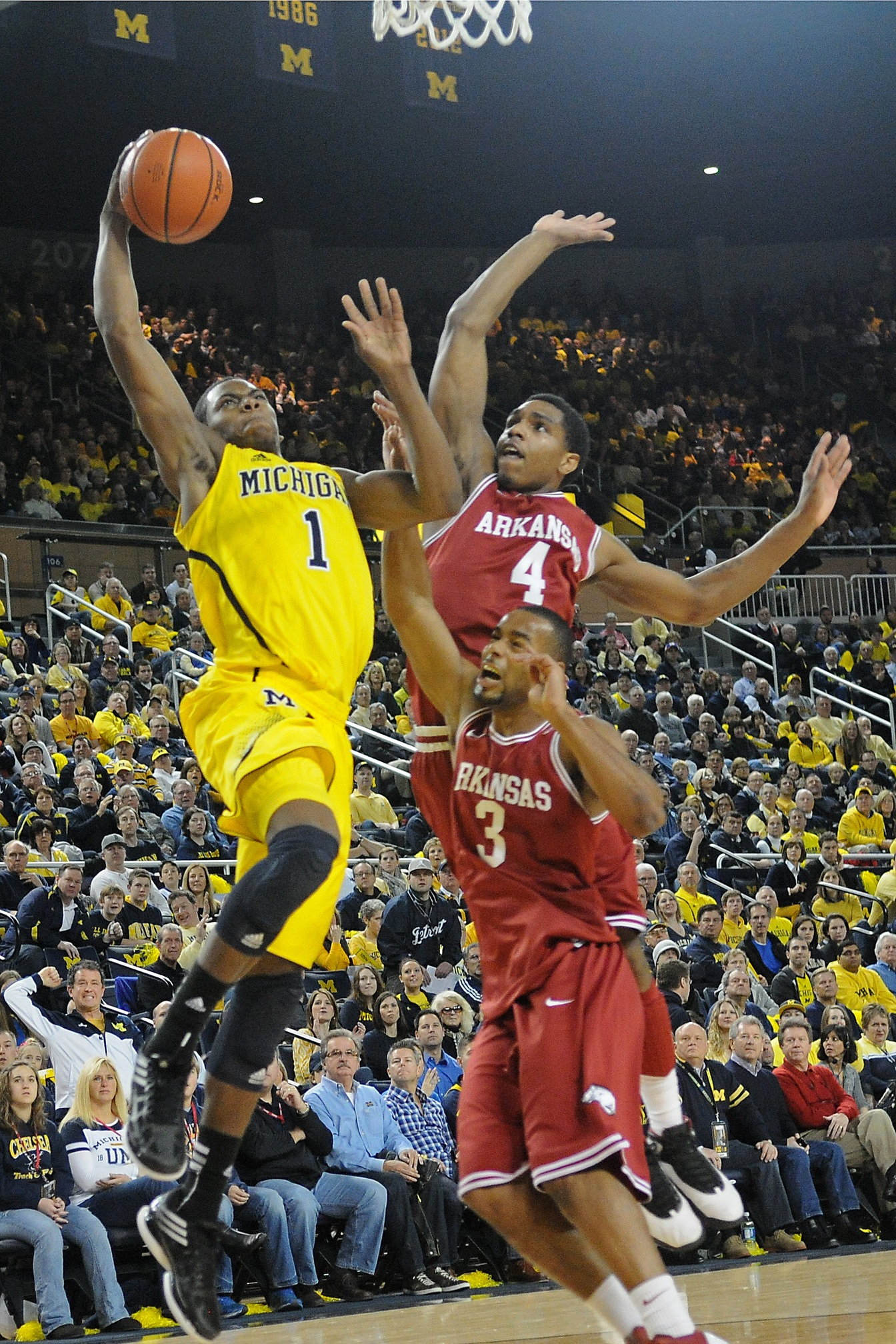
Robinson attacking the rim (December 8, 2012)

Robinson began his Michigan career in the starting lineup on November 9. In his first career game, Robinson nearly posted a double-double with ten points and eight rebounds in a 100–62 victory against Slippery Rock. In his second game, Robinson had 21 points, while making his first eight field goals in a 91–54 victory against the IUPUI Jaguars on November 12. On November 23, he posted 12 rebounds in the championship game victory in the NIT Season Tip-Off tournament against Kansas State.

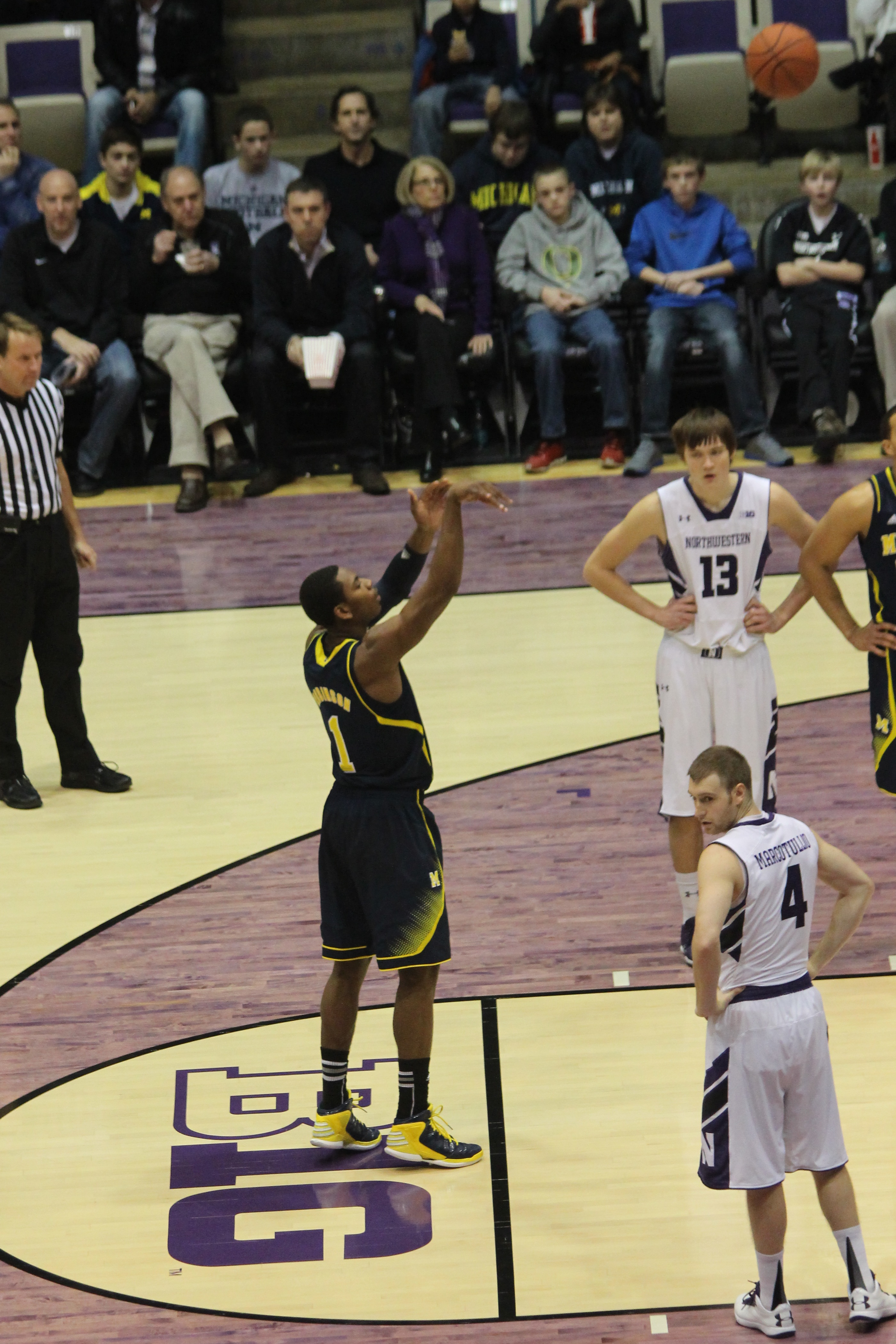
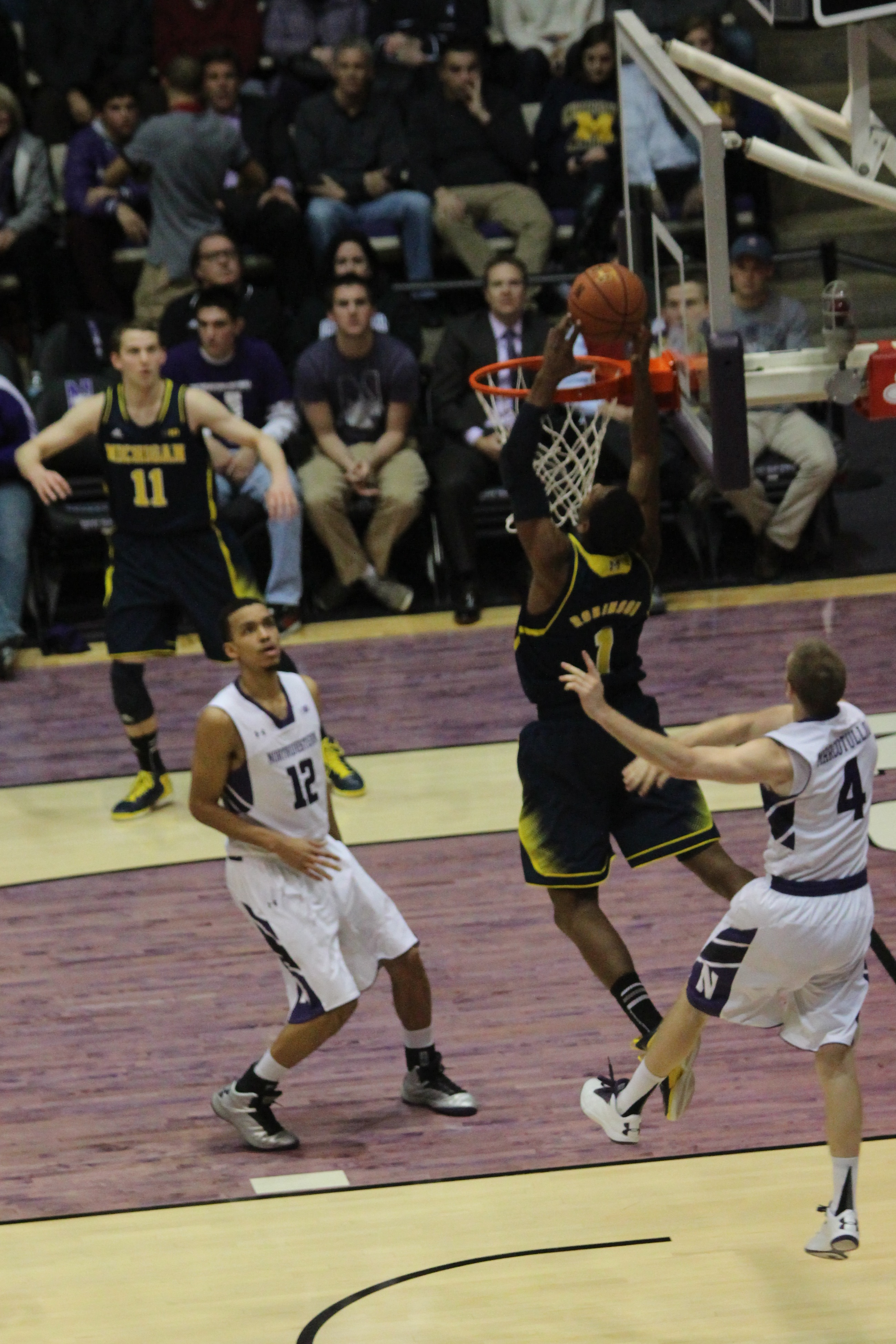
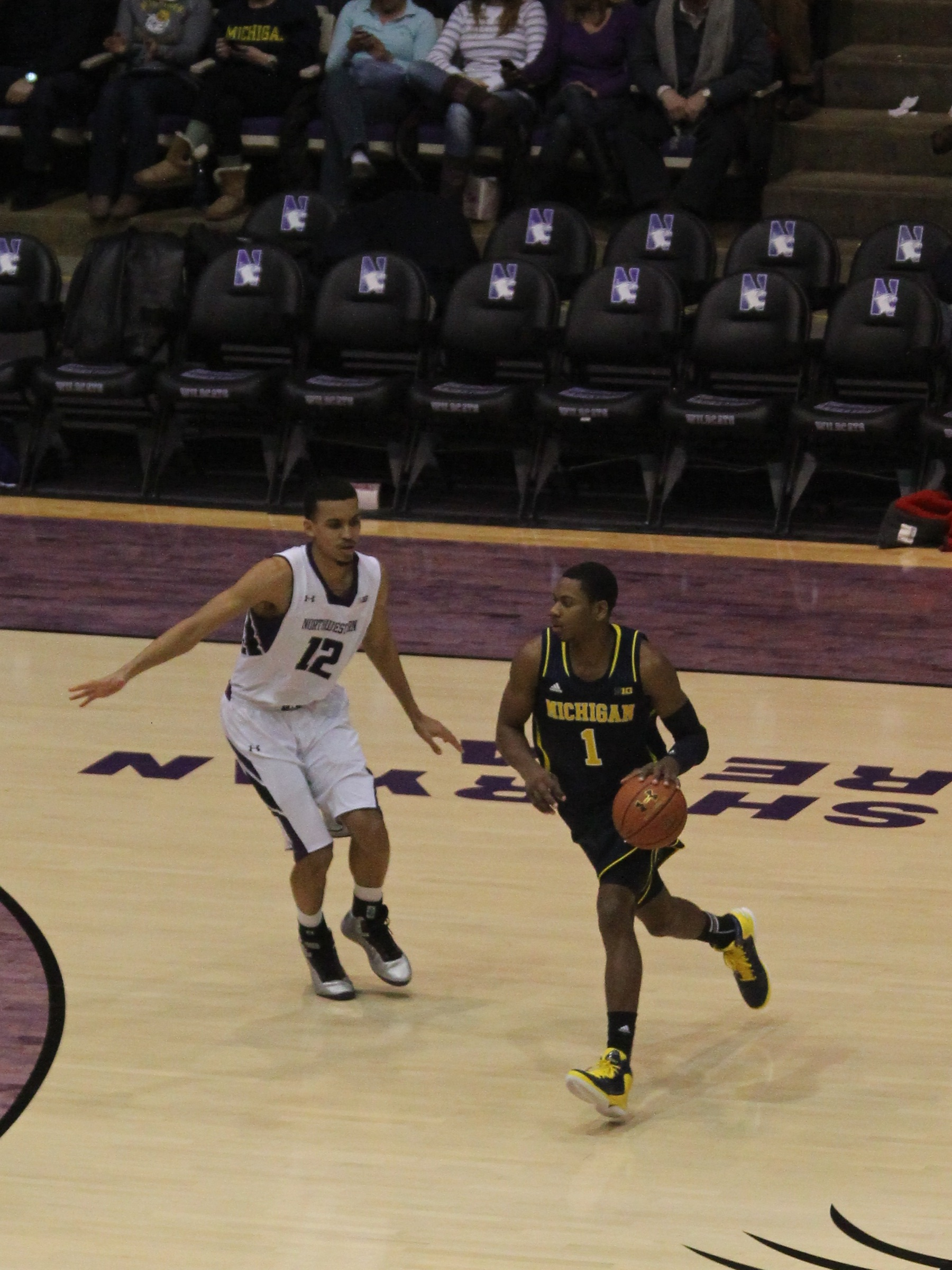
Robinson shooting a free throw (left), completing an alley oop (center) and dribbling (right) in the January 3 2012–13 Big Ten Conference men's basketball season opener against Northwestern

On January 6, Robinson posted 20 points and 10 rebounds against Iowa to earn his first career double-double. He was the first Michigan freshman to post at least 20 points and 10 rebounds in a game since LaVell Blanchard did so three times for the 1999–2000 Michigan Wolverines men's basketball team. On January 7, he earned recognition as Big Ten Conference Freshman of the Week. Robinson earned his second Big Ten Freshman of the week award on January 28 due to a pair of 12-point performances on 71.4% shooting in which he averaged 8 rebounds. On January 31, Robinson and Stauskas were named to the Wayman Tisdale Award (USBWA National Freshman of the Year) top 12 midseason list. On February 17 against Penn State, Robinson tied his career-high point total of 21 and posted his second double-double by adding 10 rebounds. He was a 2012–13 Big Ten Conference all-freshman and honorable mention all-conference selection by the coaches.

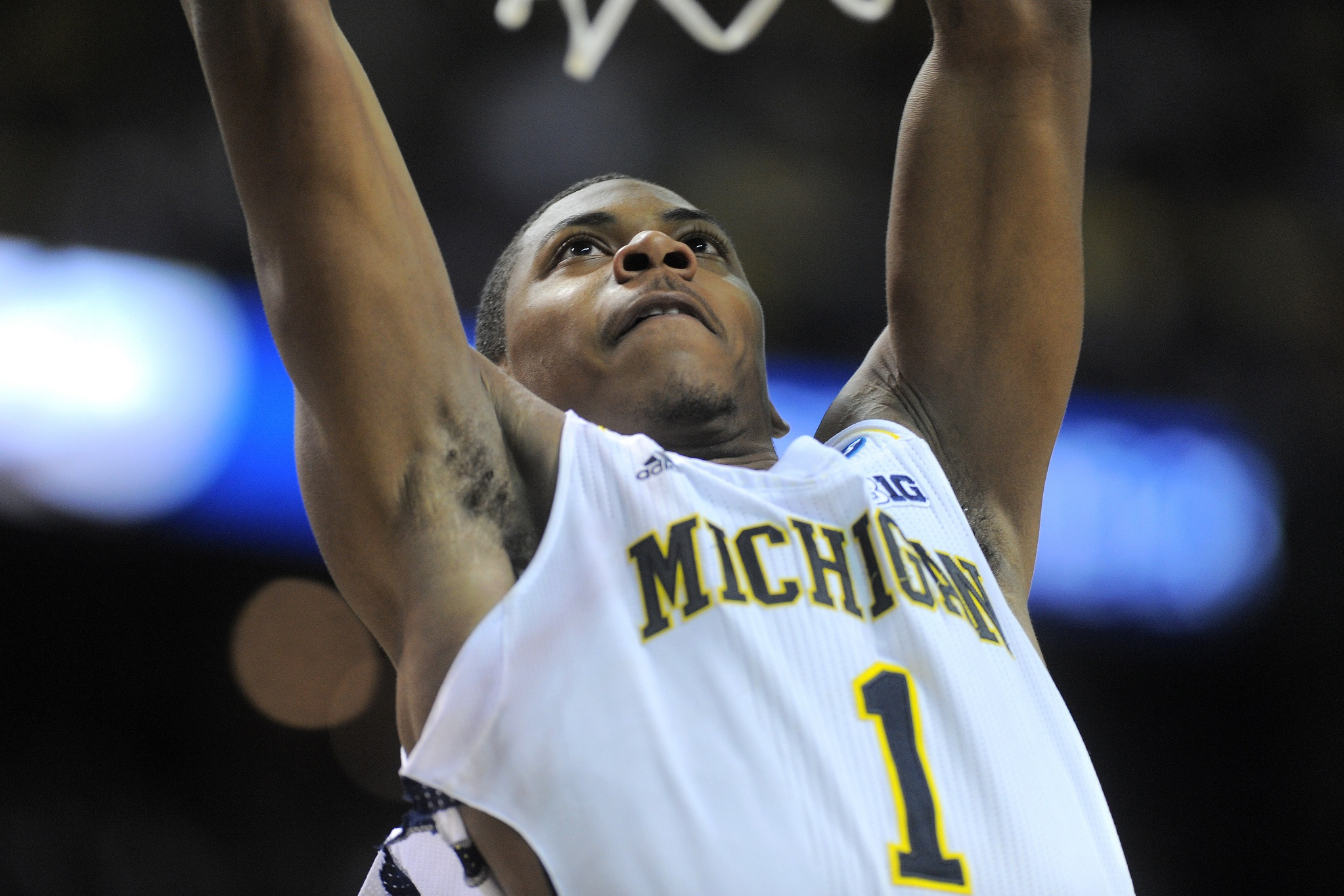
Robinson during the 2013 NCAA Division I men's basketball tournament

As a number four seed, Michigan defeated its first NCAA tournament opponent, South Dakota State, 71–56. Robinson tied his career high again with 21 points. The 27th victory of the season gave the team its most wins in 20 years and matched head coach John Beilein's career high. Michigan had held a narrow 30–26 lead at the half, but Robinson made two 3-pointers to open the second half. He scored Michigan's first eleven second-half points as South Dakota only made one field goal in that time. In the first two tournament games against South Dakota State and VCU, Robinson shot a combined 15-for-19. On March 29 against Kansas, Robinson contributed 13 points and 8 rebounds, bringing his averages in the first three tournament games to 16 points and 7.7 rebounds. During the final media timeout with 3:47 to play and Michigan trailing by 10 points, Robinson became the vocal leader during the team huddle for the first time as a Wolverine, reminding his teammates to focus on their defense. With Michigan down by 5 points, he scooped a loose ball for an offensive rebound and made a reverse layup following a Tim Hardaway Jr. missed three-point shot with 35 seconds remaining. It was part of a Michigan 14–4 run in the final 2:52 to force overtime in the victory. On April 1, he was one of two Big Ten players (Harris) named to the 21-man 2013 Kyle Macy Freshman All-America team. Michigan advanced to the April 8 national championship game where the team lost to Louisville by an 82–76 margin despite 12 points from Robinson. Following his freshman season there was speculation he was considering entering the 2013 NBA draft. He was a projected first-round pick; however, on April 18, he and Mitch McGary held a joint press conference to announce that they would not enter the draft.

=== Sophomore season ===
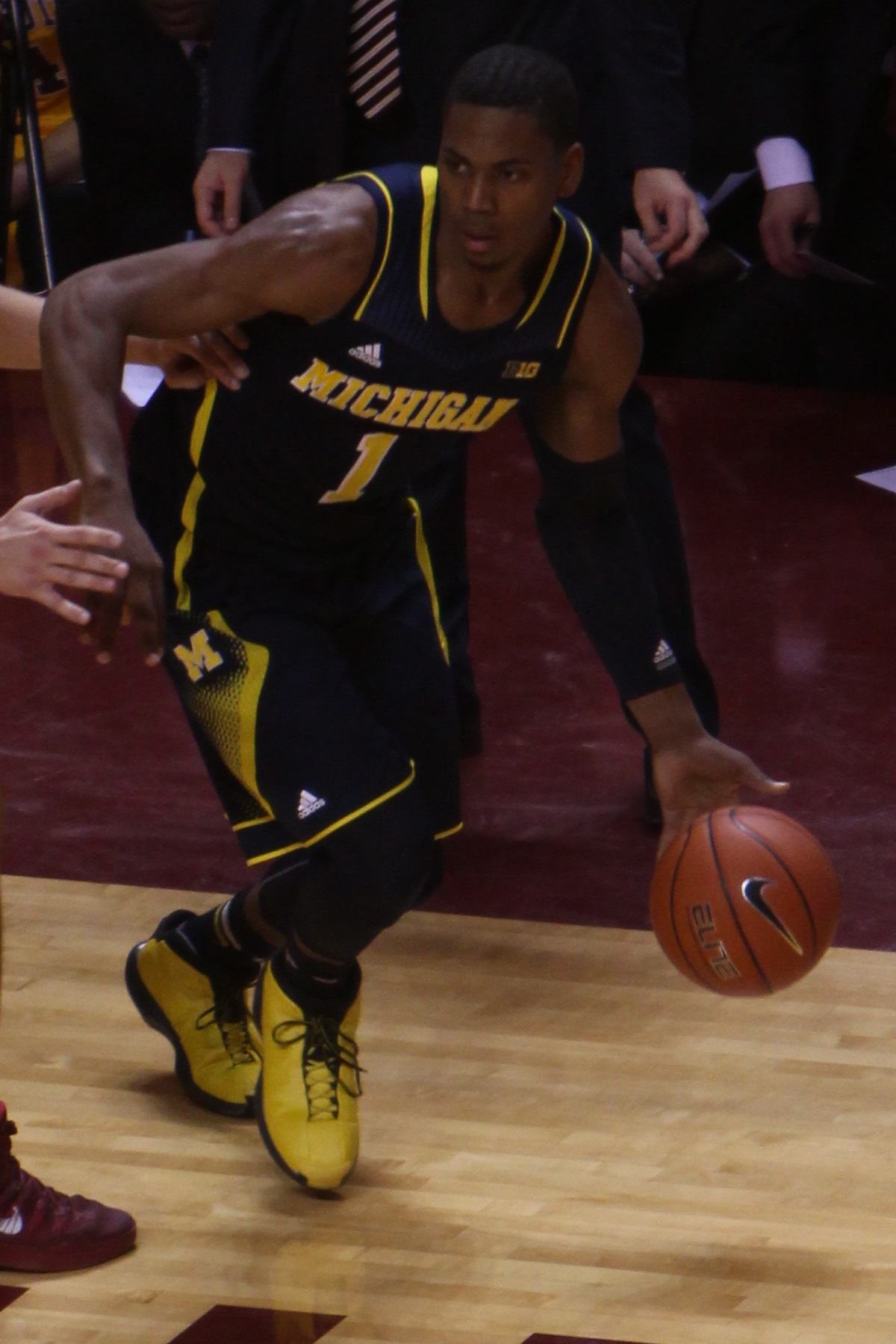
Robinson in the Michigan–Minnesota 2013–14 Big Ten season opener

Robinson declined an invitation to try out for the USA Basketball team that competed at the 2013 FIBA Under-19 World Championship, opting instead to attend a Nike Skills Academy for wing players featuring Kevin Durant and LeBron James. While training, he became the first player in the history of Michigan basketball to max out the 12-foot-3-inch (3.73 m) Vertec apparatus that is used to measure vertical leap.

Robinson was a preseason All-Big Ten selection in both the official media poll released by the Big Ten Conference and the unofficial media poll released by the Big Ten Network. Robinson was on the 50-man Naismith Award and Wooden Award preseason watchlists.

On November 8, Robinson tied career highs with 4 assists and 3 steals against UMass Lowell on a night when he also had 15 points and 7 rebounds. On November 13, Robinson earned his first Sports Illustrated cover as part of a four-version set of regional covers depicting college basketball's greatest rivalries on the college basketball preview issue. Robinson and Michigan State Spartans men's basketball player Gary Harris represented the Michigan–Michigan State basketball rivalry on one of the four regional versions. On December 14, Robinson tallied 20 points on 8-of-9 field goal shooting and 4 rebounds against (#1/#1) Arizona in a 72–70 loss. On December 28, against Holy Cross Robinson posted a career high with 23 points.

Michigan–Minnesota 2013–14 Big Ten season opener at Williams Arena

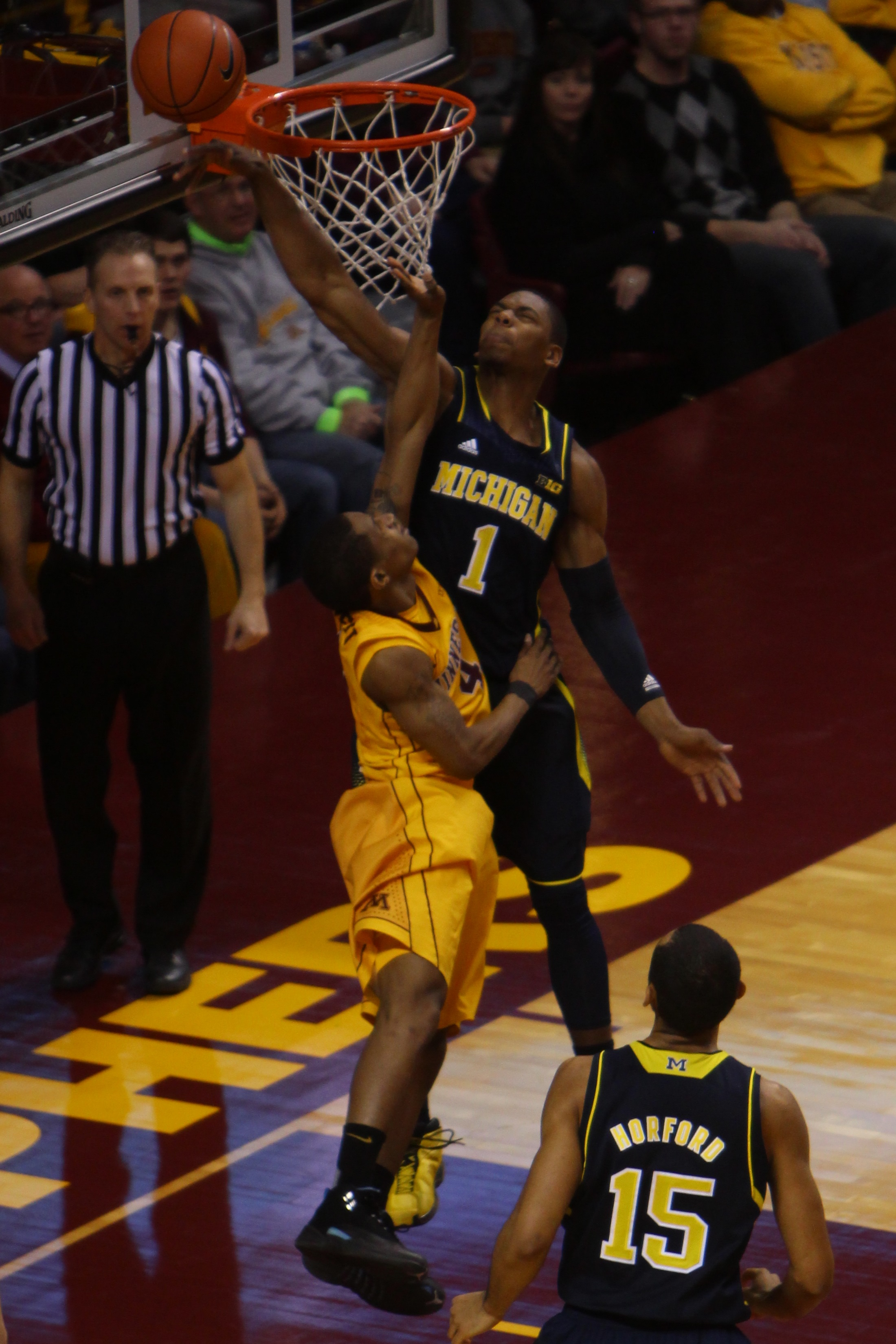
Robinson was injured making this block against Deandre Mathieu.

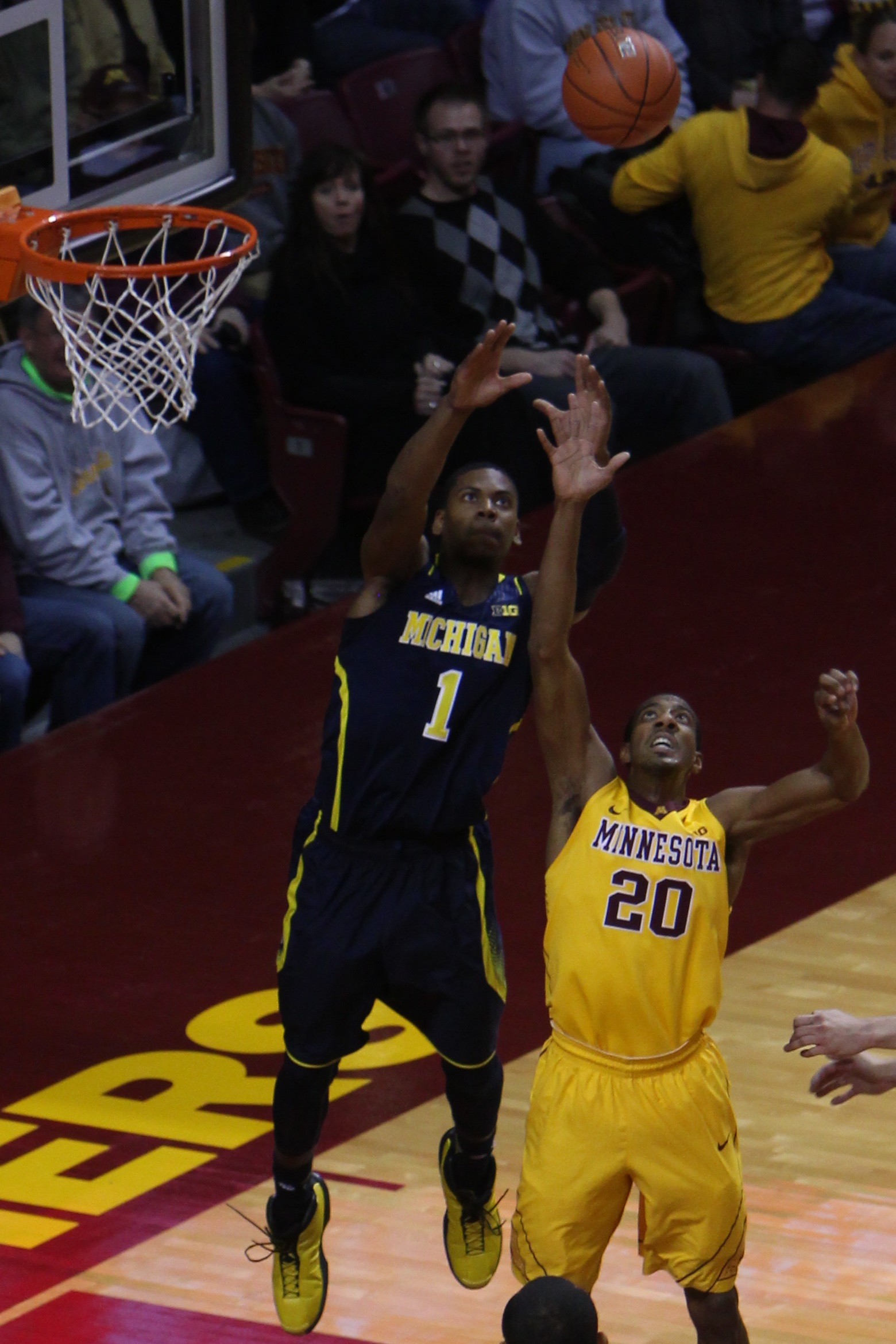
Robinson does a reverse dunk with this alley oop.

In the January 2 Big Ten Conference opener against Minnesota, Robinson set a career high with 4 blocks despite missing the final 17:24 of the game with an injury to his left ankle. Robinson tied his career high with 23 points against Nebraska on February 5 as the team posted its largest conference game margin of victory since defeating Indiana 112–64 on February 22, 1998. On February 26, Robinson contributed a team-high 17 points including a game-winning overtime buzzer beater against his father's alma mater Purdue to help the team overcome its largest deficit of the season (19). On March 8, Robinson had his fourth 20-point game of the season to help Michigan close out its season with an 84–80 victory over Indiana. His 20 points included a tie-breaking three-pointer with 1:10 remaining. Michigan clinched its first outright (unshared) Big Ten Conference championship since 1985–86. Following the regular season, he was named an honorable mention All-Big Ten selection by both the coaches and the media.

Michigan played its first two games of the 2014 NCAA Division I men's basketball tournament at the BMO Harris Bradley Center, which was the home arena for Robinson's father, Glenn Robinson, for most of his NBA career as a member of the Milwaukee Bucks. In the two games at the Bradley Center against Wofford and Texas, Robinson scored 14 points in each game and averaged 6 rebounds. In the Sweet Sixteen round, he opposed his father's former Purdue roommate and Tennessee head coach Cuonzo Martin. Robinson scored 13 points as Michigan again advanced in the tournament. The 2013–14 team was eliminated in the Elite Eight round of the NCAA tournament by Kentucky.

On April 15, in a joint press conference with Stauskas, Robinson announced that he was declaring himself eligible for the 2014 NBA draft. During his two years with Michigan, the school enjoyed its winningest two-year stretch in school history, marked by a total of 59 wins.

== Professional career ==
=== Minnesota Timberwolves (2014–2015) ===
At the May NBA Draft Combine, Robinson excelled with the top standing vertical jump at the combine, the top small forward spot up shooting percentage and impressive measurements. Robinson was pleased with his overall performance, but disappointed with his 41.5-inch (1.05 m) running vertical jump, which was short of his 44-inch (1.12 m) personal best. Robinson was drafted in the second round of the 2014 draft with the 40th overall pick by the Minnesota Timberwolves. With teammates Stauskas and McGary also being drafted, it marked the first time Michigan had at least three draft picks since the 1990 NBA draft. With Burke and Hardaway having been drafted the year before, every player that started in the 2013 NCAA Division I men's basketball championship game was drafted either in the 2013 or 2014 NBA draft.

Robinson committed to represent the Timberwolves in 2014 NBA Summer League. On September 17, 2014, he signed with the Timberwolves and then made the opening day 15-man roster. Robinson made his professional debut with the Timberwolves on November 14 against the New Orleans Pelicans, scoring 1 point in 8 minutes of play. On November 21, he posted his first field goals with a 2-for-2 shooting performance against the defending champion San Antonio Spurs. Among his early performances, he tallied 7 points on December 6 against the Spurs and 4 rebounds on December 8 against the Golden State Warriors. On March 5, 2015, he was waived by the Timberwolves.

=== Philadelphia 76ers (2015) ===
On March 7, 2015, he was claimed off waivers by the Philadelphia 76ers. Robinson debuted for the 76ers on March 14 against the Brooklyn Nets, going scoreless in 7 minutes. He reached double digits for the first time on April 11 against the Chicago Bulls, scoring 10 points. Robinson started in the season finale on April 15 against the Miami Heat. It was his first and only start of the season and he posted a season-high 8 rebounds to go along with another 10-point performance.

The 76ers opted not to make a qualifying offer to Robinson before the July 1, 2015 signing period, thus making him a free agent. He later joined the Atlanta Hawks for the 2015 NBA Summer League on July 9.

=== Indiana Pacers (2015–2018) ===
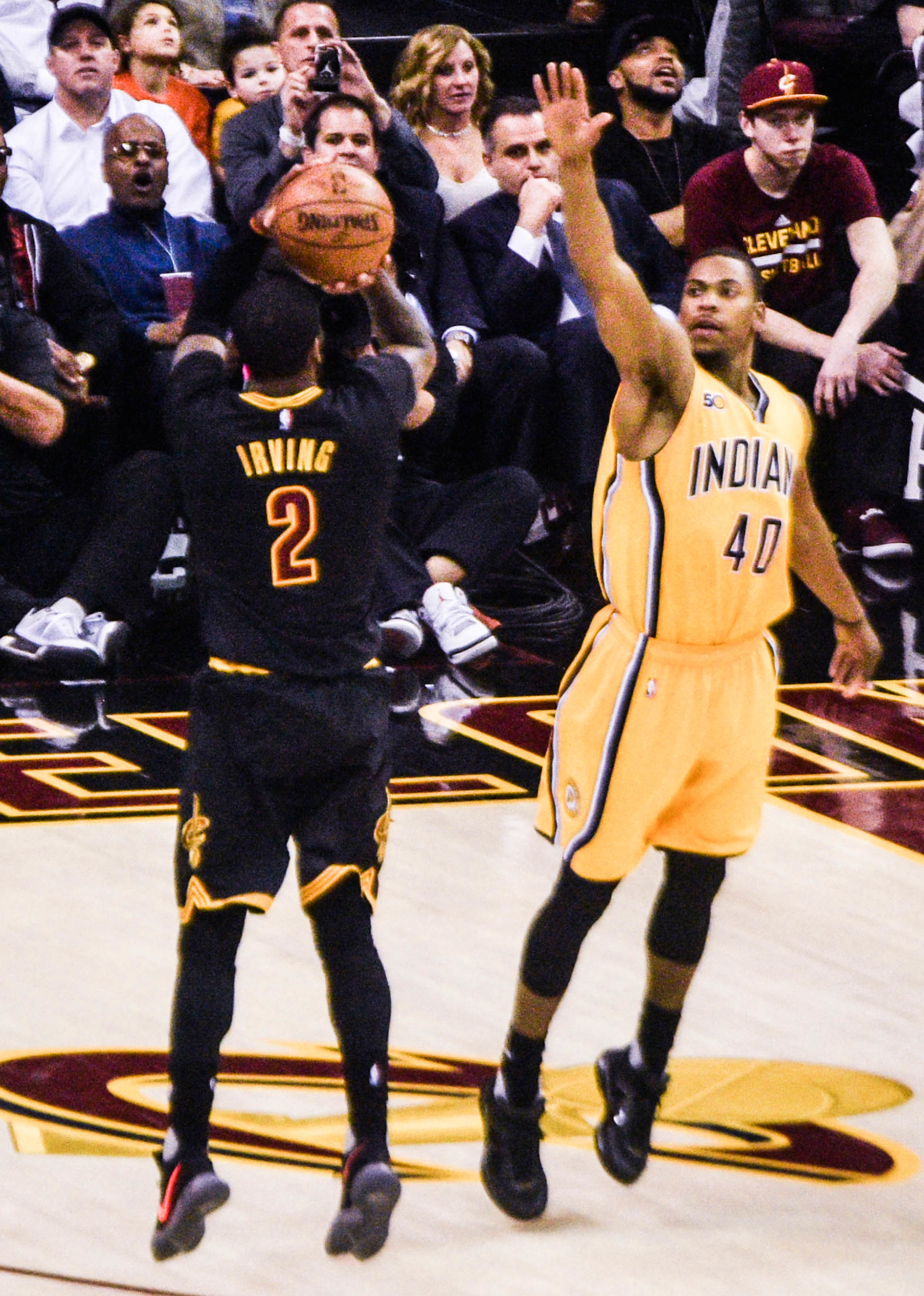
Robinson trying to block a Kyrie Irving three-pointer in 2017

On July 27, 2015, Robinson signed a three-year deal with the Indiana Pacers. Pacer General Manager Larry Bird noted that he had been attempting to acquire Robinson for some time due to the potential that he saw. He hooked Robinson up with shooting guru Hal Wissel for extra attention during his first offseason. While with the team, he was assigned to guard Paul George during practices. Robinson entered the season impaired by shoulder soreness and did not dress for the October 28 season opener. Robinson began practicing with the team at the beginning of November as he recovered from his shoulder injury.

On November 4, 2015, Robinson debuted with the Pacers against the Boston Celtics in their fifth game of the season. Robinson posted 10 points and 2 rebounds in 19 minutes of action. On November 13, he posted 11 points against the Minnesota Timberwolves. On November 21, he scored a career-high 17 points off the bench and was 4-of-4 from three-point range against the Milwaukee Bucks. On December 27, he was assigned to the Fort Wayne Mad Ants of the NBA Development League. He was recalled the next day. With George Hill attending to personal business and Rodney Stuckey injured, the Pacers—who only dressed 10 players—gave Robinson his first start of the season on January 17 against the Denver Nuggets. Hill missed three consecutive games and came off the bench for a fourth as he endured the loss of his grandmother, mourned the loss of a former IUPUI Jaguars men's basketball teammate and celebrated the birth of his first child. Hill replaced Robinson in the starting lineup on January 26 against the Los Angeles Clippers.

On November 20, 2016, with forwards George, C. J. Miles and Kevin Seraphin sidelined, Robinson started and posted a double double with 16 points and 11 rebounds in an overtime win against the Oklahoma City Thunder. He got his second start of the season on November 25 and finished with a team-high and career-high 20 points and five rebounds against the Brooklyn Nets. Those two starts were regarded as the best two performances of his career up to that date. Robinson returned to the starting lineup when Monta Ellis was injured in mid-December. He posted a season-high rebounding performance in a 12-point, 12-rebound double-double against the Detroit Pistons in his fourth start in his return to the starting lineup.

During the 2017 All-Star Weekend, Robinson became the first Pacers player since Fred Jones (in 2004) to win the Slam Dunk Contest. On March 24 with less than 3 weeks left in the regular season, Robinson was sidelined for at least two weeks with a calf strain. After missing the final 11 games of the regular season, Robinson was sidelined for the first game of the 2017 NBA playoffs on April 15 against Cleveland, but he returned to the lineup for game 2 on April 17.

Robinson was injured during a September 29, 2017 intrasquad scrimmage. On October 13, 2017, he was ruled out for three to four months after undergoing surgery for a repair of medial and lateral ligaments in his left ankle. On February 1, 2018, he began a rehab assignment with Fort Wayne. He was recalled by the Pacers later that day. On February 23, 2018, he made his season debut for the Pacers against the Atlanta Hawks. He had four points and two rebounds in 19 minutes.

=== Detroit Pistons (2018–2019) ===
Robinson considered signing with the Golden State Warriors, but anticipated greater playing time with the Pistons. On July 7, 2018, Robinson signed with the Detroit Pistons. Robinson was injured on December 10 and was sidelined for the subsequent eight games. Although he was cleared to play on December 30, he did not return to the court until late in a January 1, 2019 contest against the Milwaukee Bucks. Robinson's salary with the Pistons was the highest of his NBA career at $4 million ($5.1 million in 2025). However, he only shot 29% on his three-point shot attempts, reducing his value as a free agent following his time with Detroit.

=== Golden State Warriors (2019–2020) ===
On July 10, 2019, Robinson signed a two-year deal with the Golden State Warriors. On November 25, Robinson posted a career-high 25 points against the Oklahoma City Thunder. He matched that high on December 31 against the San Antonio Spurs. While with the Warriors, Robinson created a non-profit foundation "dedicated to empowering fathers and supporting single-parent households". Named after his young daughter, Ariana, titled the Angels are Real Indeed (A.R.I. or ARI), its first event was donating 200 turkeys to needy families for Thanksgiving 2019. Robinson started all 48 games that he played with the Warriors and achieved several statistical career-best averages with the team: 12.9 points, 4.7 rebounds and 1.8 assists in 31.6 minutes per game.

=== Return to Philadelphia (2020) ===
On February 6, 2020, Robinson and teammate Alec Burks were traded to the Philadelphia 76ers in exchange for three second-round draft picks. Robinson matched his career high of 25 points again on March 3, 2020, against the Los Angeles Lakers.

=== Sacramento Kings (2020–2021) ===
On December 2, 2020, Robinson signed a one-year contract with the Sacramento Kings. On February 24, 2021, the Kings waived Robinson. This transaction occurred immediately before the NBA deadline by which nonguaranteed contracts become guaranteed for the season, which saved the team about $1 million.

=== Wisconsin Herd (2023–2024) ===
During the summer of 2023, Robinson resumed his professional basketball career. He scheduled several workouts with NBA teams. On October 19, 2023, Robinson signed with the Milwaukee Bucks, but was waived two days later. Nine days later, he joined the Wisconsin Herd, the Bucks' NBA G League affiliate. With the Herd, he played a leadership role both on and off the court.

=== Magnolia Chicken Timplados Hotshots (2024) ===
In July 2024, Robinson signed with the Magnolia Chicken Timplados Hotshots of the Philippine Basketball Association (PBA) as the team's import for the 2024 PBA Governors' Cup. In September, he was replaced by Shabazz Muhammad.

=== Seoul Samsung Thunders (2025) ===
On February 26, 2025, Robinson signed with the Seoul Samsung Thunders of the Korean Basketball League, replacing Marcus Derrickson.

== Career statistics ==
Legend
GP	Games played	GS	Games started	MPG	Minutes per game
FG%	Field goal percentage	3P%	3-point field goal percentage	FT%	Free throw percentage
RPG	Rebounds per game	APG	Assists per game	SPG	Steals per game
BPG	Blocks per game	PPG	Points per game	**Bold**	Career high

=== NBA ===
==== Regular season ====
Year	Team	GP	GS	MPG	FG%	3P%	FT%	RPG	APG	SPG	BPG	PPG
2014–15	Minnesota	25	0	4.3	.333	.167	.750	.6	.1	.1	.0	1.2
2014–15	Philadelphia	10	1	15.3	.419	.308	.500	2.5	.8	.3	.1	4.4
2015–16	Indiana	45	4	11.3	.430	.378	.692	1.5	.6	.4	.2	3.8
2016–17	Indiana	**69**	27	20.7	.467	.392	.711	3.6	.7	.6	**.3**	6.1
2017–18	Indiana	23	1	14.7	.424	**.412**	.818	1.6	.7	.6	.0	4.1
2018–19	Detroit	47	18	13.0	.420	.290	.800	1.5	.4	.3	.2	4.2
2019–20	Golden State	48	**48**	**31.6**	.481	.400	.851	**4.7**	**1.8**	**.9**	**.3**	**12.9**
2019–20	Philadelphia	14	4	19.3	**.518**	.333	**.917**	3.1	.8	.6	.1	7.7
2020–21	Sacramento	23	2	16.0	.424	.364	.913	2.0	.9	.2	.1	5.3
Career		304	105	17.4	.457	.373	.779	2.6	.8	.5	.2	5.9

==== Playoffs ====
Year	Team	GP	GS	MPG	FG%	3P%	FT%	RPG	APG	SPG	BPG	PPG
2016	Indiana	**4**	0	2.6	.750	—	1.000	.0	.0	.0	**.3**	1.8
2017	Indiana	3	0	10.4	**1.000**	**1.000**	.500	1.0	.3	.0	.0	**5.0**
2018	Indiana	2	0	3.0	**1.000**	—	—	.5	.0	.0	.0	1.0
2019	Detroit	3	0	**12.0**	.267	.125	**1.000**	**2.3**	**.7**	**.7**	.0	4.3
Career		12	0	6.9	.538	.300	.857	.9	.3	.2	.1	3.1

=== College ===
Year	Team	GP	GS	MPG	FG%	3P%	FT%	RPG	APG	SPG	BPG	PPG
2012–13	Michigan	**39**	**39**	**33.6**	**.572**	**.324**	.676	**5.4**	1.1	**1.0**	**.3**	11.0
2013–14	Michigan	37	37	32.3	.488	.306	**.757**	4.4	**1.2**	.9	**.3**	**13.1**
Career		76	76	33.0	.525	.313	.718	4.9	1.1	1.0	.3	12.0

== Personal life ==
Robinson is the founder of the Angels are Real Indeed, Foundation, a nonprofit organization dedicated to providing resources to fatherless families. Based in his hometown of Gary, Indiana, the ARI Foundation is named after Robinson's daughter, Ariana. The ARI Foundation has hosted toy drives, back-to-school supply and holiday-specific fundraisers, and has furnished the apartments of working-class single mothers. The nonprofit's work has been featured in CNN, Sports Illustrated and USA Today.

Robinson is the son of Shantelle Clay and Glenn Robinson, who was a two-time NBA All-Star. His grandfather Glenn A. Robinson Sr. has been in and out of trouble with the law. Some but not all of his nicknames stem from being named the third (III). Robinson's nicknames include "Tre" "GR3", and "Little Dog".McGavin, Kevin Daily Herald; Arlington Heights, Ill.. 05 Apr 2019. His younger brother, Gelen (class of 2014), was the 2013 & 2014 Indiana High School Athletic Association (IHSAA) 220-pound (100 kg) wrestling champion, 2014 IHSAA discus champion, 2013 IHSAA shot put runner-up, 2013 IHSAA discus runner-up and 2013 Post-Tribune Football Defensive Player of the Year. Gelen verbally committed to the Purdue Boilermakers football team and played 46 games in four seasons, achieving third team 2017 All-Big Ten Conference football team status. His younger sister, Jaimie, is an athlete in track & field. As a freshman, she was 2014 Class 2A Illinois High School Association (IHSA) runner-up in the triple jump for De La Salle Institute. As a sophomore, she was the 2015 Class 2A IHSA state champion in the triple jump De La Salle, setting the IHSA Class 2A record at 40 ft 0 in (12.19 m). As a senior, she was 3-time 2017 IHSA Class 3A state champion in the triple jump, long jump, and 200 metres for Homewood-Flossmoor High School, setting the Class 3A state record in the triple jump at 42 ft 8.5 in (13.02 m). She ran track in college for Alabama Crimson Tide (2018), Oregon Ducks (2019–21) and Ohio State Buckeyes (2022–23), earning Big Ten Indoor and Outdoor Championship triple jump championships in 2022 and Big Ten Indoor and Outdoor Championship triple jump runner up finishes in 2023, as well as the Ohio State Outdoor Triple Jump school record. He has another brother, Gicarri Harris, who signed with Purdue men's basketball for the class of 2024.
