= Mallard Creek High School =

American public school in North Carolina

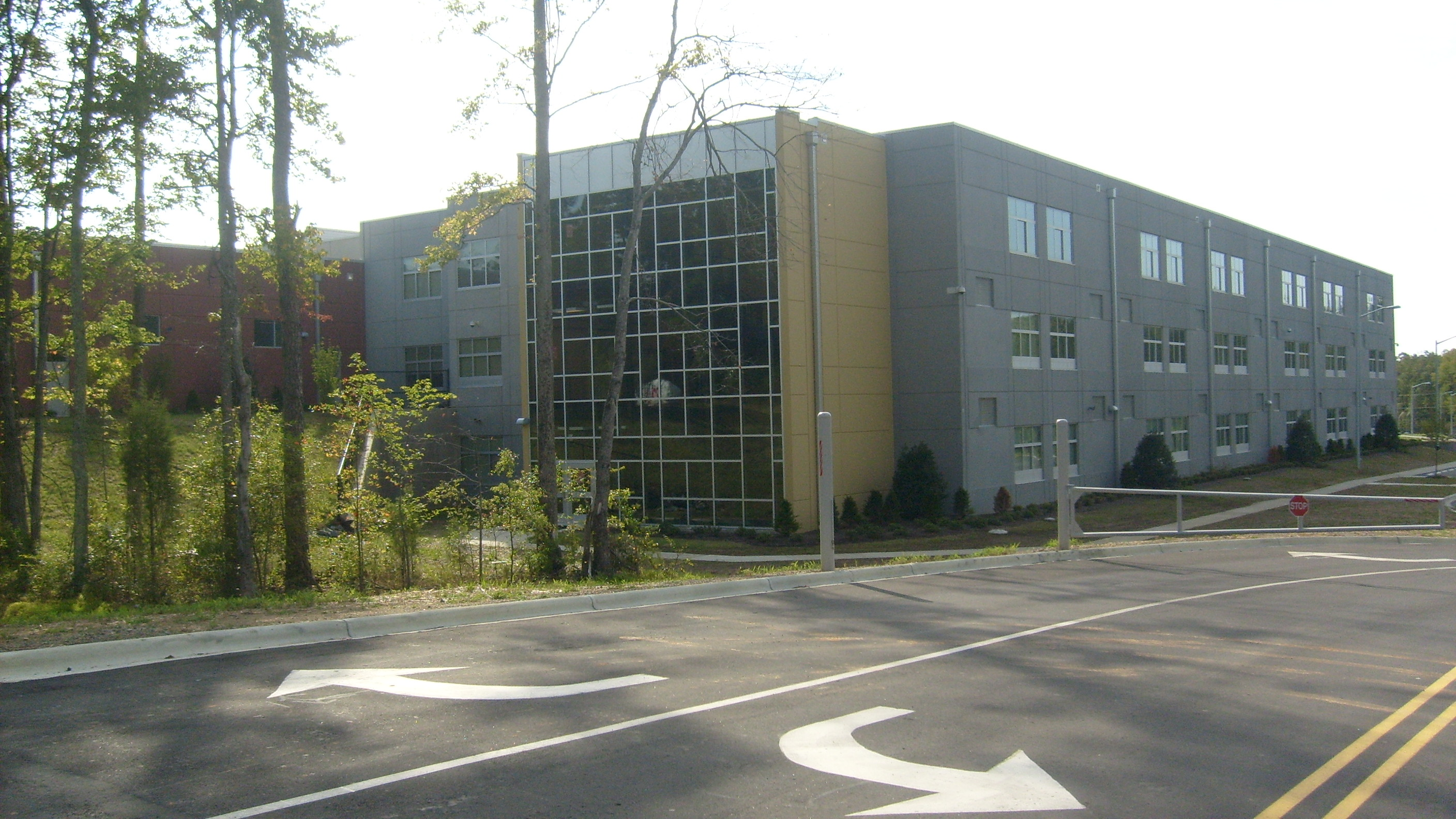
- Mallard Creek High School, December 2007

Location
- 3825 Johnston Oehler Rd; Charlotte, North Carolina 28269; United States; 35°21′55″N 80°46′11″W

Information
- Other name: The Creek
- Type: Public
- Established: 2007 (19 years ago)
- School district: Charlotte-Mecklenburg Schools
- Oversight: Charlotte-Mecklenburg School Board
- CEEB code: 340732
- Principal: Jared Thompson
- Faculty: 222
- Teaching staff: 113.15 (FTE)
- Grades: 9–12
- Enrollment: 2,099 (2023-2024)
- Student to teacher ratio: 18.55
- Colors: Navy, cardinal red, Vegas gold
- Athletics: NCHSAA 8A
- Athletics conference: Meck Power Six 7A/8A
- Mascot: Mavericks
- Yearbook: Unbridled
- Website: mallardcreekhs.cmsk12.org

Mallard Creek High School is a comprehensive public high school located in Charlotte, North Carolina. It was the 21st high school in the Charlotte-Mecklenburg Schools district. The school opened to 1,200 students on August 27, 2007.

== Campus and facilities ==
Built in the similar style as its sister school, Ardrey Kell High School, Mallard Creek is a three-story, pre-cast concrete building, surrounding a large central courtyard. The school is located near the I-485 belt loop in Mecklenburg County, and the Highland Creek community. The concrete is colored in certain exterior areas to represent the school's colors: navy blue, cardinal red, and Vegas gold. At over 351,000 square feet (32,600 m^{2}), it is one of the largest single-school buildings in the Piedmont area of North Carolina, and the largest school in the Charlotte-Mecklenburg School District. The school has a football stadium (with a turf field), a baseball–softball complex, and a large gymnasium, as well as an adjoining practice gymnasium, tennis courts, and soccer fields. The school shares practice fields and the athletic stadium with nearby Mallard Creek Community Park, and local community athletic groups.

== Athletics ==
Mallard Creek's teams are known as the "Mavericks". The school is a member of the North Carolina High School Athletic Association (NCHSAA) and is classified as an 8A school. It is a part of the Meck Power Six 7A/8A Conference.

The school's football team won three straight NCHSAA 4AA State Championships in 2013, 2014, and 2015. The men's outdoor track and field team won the NCHSAA 4A State Championship in 2015.

== Notable alumni ==
- Kaylyn Brown, track athlete, 2024 Summer Olympics gold medalist in women's 4x400 m relay
- Cravont Charleston, track athlete, competed at 2023 World Championships
- Gabbi Cunningham, track athlete, competed at 2020 Summer Olympics
- Jordan Davis, NFL defensive tackle, Super Bowl LIX champion with the Philadelphia Eagles
- Amari Henderson, CFL defensive back
- D. J. Humphries, NFL offensive tackle and Pro Bowl selection in 2021
- Nafees Lyon, CFL defensive back
- Thaddeus Moss, NFL tight end, CFP national champion with LSU
- Jaylen Samuels, NFL running back
- Trenton Simpson, NFL linebacker
- Marquise Williams, American football quarterback
