= Taylor Werner =

American middle- and long-distance runner

Personal information
- Nationality: United States
- Born: May 1, 1998 (age 28)
- Height: 1.67 m (5 ft 6 in)

Sport
- Country: United States
- Sport: Track, long-distance running
- Event(s): 1500 m, 3000 m, 5000 m, cross country, 10,000 m
- College team: Arkansas
- Coached by: Lance Harter '16-Present

Achievements and titles
- Personal bests: 1500 m: 4:13.53 (Nashville 2020); Indoor Mile: 4:39.52i (Fayetteville 2019); Indoor 3000 m: 8:51.91 (New York City 2020); Indoor 5000 m: 15:11.19 (Boston 2019); 10,000 m: 32:26.38 (Stanford 2019)
Medal record
Women's athletics
Representing the United States
Pan American Games
Silver medal – second place	2023 Santiago	5000 m
Pan American U20 Championships
Gold medal – first place	2017 Trujillo	3000 m

Taylor Werner (born May 1, 1998) is an American middle- and long-distance runner. Representing the University of Arkansas, her team won the 2019 NCAA Division I Cross Country Championships. Werner is the Pan American U20 Championships 3000 m champion.

== Professional ==
Werner, running the fastest time 5K in the U.S. during the winter season, recorded a personal best 15:11.19 during a win at Boston University on December 7. 2019, in Boston, Massachusetts.

Year	Competition	Venue	Position	Event	Notes
Major international competitions
2023	Pan American Games	Santiago, Chile	2nd	5000m	16:06.48
2017	Pan American U20 Championships	Trujillo, Peru	1st	3000m	9:16.12
Puma
2021	Olympic trials	Eugene, Oregon	11th	5000m	15:56.83
Representing Arkansas
2017	United States Junior Championships	Sacramento, California	1st	3000m	9:35.56

== NCAA @ Arkansas ==
Werner is a student-athlete from University of Arkansas in Fayetteville, Arkansas, where she earned 7 All-American honors and is a 3 time Southeastern Conference Champion.

Werner was recruited to the University of Arkansas for track and cross country in 2016, Werner's first NCAA championship appearance was at the 2016 NCAA Division I Cross Country Championships, where she finished 16th. She qualified for and placed twenty-second in the 5000 m at the 2017 NCAA Division I Outdoor Track and Field Championships.

Year	Competition	Venue	Position	Event	Notes
NCAA Division I Championships
2019	2019 NCAA Division I Cross Country Championships	Terre Haute, Indiana	4th	6 km	20:11.1
2019	Southeastern Conference Cross Country Championships	Lexington, Kentucky	2nd	6 km	19:42.8
2019	2019 NCAA Division I Outdoor Track and Field Championships	Austin, Texas	2nd	5 km	15:51.24
2019	2019 NCAA Division I Outdoor Track and Field Championships	Austin, Texas	4th	10 km	33:20.68
2019	Southeastern Conference Outdoor Track and Field Championships	Fayetteville, Arkansas	1st	5 km	15:51.08
2019	Southeastern Conference Outdoor Track and Field Championships	Fayetteville, Arkansas	4th	1500 m	4:20.40
2019	2019 NCAA Division I Indoor Track and Field Championships	Birmingham, Alabama	2nd	3 km	9:01.75
2019	2019 NCAA Division I Indoor Track and Field Championships	Birmingham, Alabama	5th	DMR	10:56.85
2019	Southeastern Conference Indoor Track and Field Championships	Birmingham, Alabama	1st	3 km	9:15.57
2019	Southeastern Conference Indoor Track and Field Championships	Birmingham, Alabama	1st	5 km	16:18.39
2018	2018 NCAA Division I Cross Country Championships	Madison, Wisconsin	81st	6 km	20:58.0
2018	Southeastern Conference Cross Country Championships	Auburn, Alabama	6th	6 km	19:22.2
2018	Southeastern Conference Indoor Track and Field Championships	College Station, Texas	4th	3 km	9:17.62
2018	Southeastern Conference Indoor Track and Field Championships	College Station, Texas	3rd	5 km	16:35.34
2017	2017 NCAA Division I Cross Country Championships	Louisville, Kentucky	104th	6 km	20:44.7
2017	Southeastern Conference Cross Country Championships	Athens, Georgia	2nd	6 km	20:07.1
2017	2017 NCAA Division I Outdoor Track and Field Championships	Eugene, Oregon	22nd	5 km	16:25.25
2017	Southeastern Conference Outdoor Track and Field Championships	Columbia, South Carolina	2nd	10 km	34:15.71
2016	2016 NCAA Division I Cross Country Championships	Terre Haute, Indiana	16th	6 km	20:10.5
2016	Southeastern Conference Cross Country Championships	Fayetteville, Arkansas	15th	6 km	21:01.0

== Early life ==
Werner was raised in Bloomsdale, Missouri, the sister of Shelby Werner, an NCAA Division II runner at Missouri Southern State Lions. Taylor is a Four-time XC All- American high school runner.

Year	Foot Locker Cross Country Championships	
2015	5th 17:29.8	
2013	10th 17:44.0	
2012	13th 17:53	
Year	Nike Cross Nationals	
2013	5th 17:34.0	
Representing Ste. Genevieve High School at Missouri State High School Activities Association
Year	Cross Country class 3 state championship	Outdoor Track and Field class 4 state championship
2015-16	17:14.22; 1st place	3200 m 10:49.20; 2nd
2015-16	17:14.22; 1st place	1600 m 4:51.39; 1st
2015-16	17:14.22; 1st place	800 m 2:15.45; 2nd
2014-15	18:20.8; 1st place	3200 m 10:34.27; 1st
2014-15	18:20.8; 1st place	1600 m 4:59.62; 1st
2014-15	18:20.8; 1st place	800 m 2:17.06; 6th
2013-14	17:31.3; 1st place	3200 m 10:19.15; 1st
2013-14	17:31.3; 1st place	1600 m 4:44.26; 1st
2013-14	17:31.3; 1st place	800 m 2:15.18; 1st
2012-13	18:19.9; 1st place	3200 m 10:38.04; 1st
2012-13	18:19.9; 1st place	1600 m 4:52.52; 1st
2012-13	18:19.9; 1st place	800 m 2:14.02; 1st
