= Jelena Rowe =

American high jumper (born 1999)

Personal information
- Nationality: American
- Born: 1 August 1999 (age 26)

Sport
- Sport: Track and Field
- Event: High Jump

Achievements and titles
- Personal bests: High jump: 1.96 m (Tucson, 2021)
Medal record
Women's athletics
Representing the United States
Pan American U20 Athletics Championships
Silver medal – second place	2017 Trujilo	High jump

Jelena Rowe (born August 1, 1999) is an American athlete who competes in the high jump.

== Biography ==
From Bloom Township, Illinois, Rowe attended Bloom High School. She was 6 feet tall as a freshman, then 6'3" as a sophomore and 6'4" as a junior. Rowe played a number of sports such as Volleyball and basketball before settling on athletics and the high jump.

Rowe cleared a height of 1.85 metres at the Illinois Top Times indoor state meet on March 26, 2017, in Bloomington, Illinois and matched that height outdoors on April 22, 2017, at the Sue Pariseau Invite at Glenbard West. In June 2017, she became USA Junior Champion in the high jump, making a clearance of 1.79m metres in Sacramento. She was a silver medalist behind María Fernanda Murillo at the 2017 Pan American U20 Athletics Championships in Trujillo, Peru, in July 2017.

In February 2021, Rowe cleared 1.91 indoors for a new personal best, finishing second to Vashti Cunningham at the American Track League event in Fayetteville, Arkansas. On May 22, 2021, Rowe cleared 1.96m at a meet in Tucson, Arizona. This height ranked her in the top-ten worldwide for the calendar year 2021.

Rowe jumped 1.91m to finish in third place at the USA Indoor Championships on 27 February 2022, in Spokane, Washington. Both Rowe and her training partner Vashti Cunningham however, opted against competing at the 2022 World Athletics Indoor Championships in Belgrade, Serbia due to restrictions around COVID "athlete bubbles".

In February 2025, she placed sixth at the USA Indoor Track and Field Championships in New York.
