= 2019 NCAA Division I cross country championships =

2019 cross-country running meet of the NCAA (Division I)

2019 NCAA Division I Cross Country Championships
- Edition: 81st–Men; 39th–Women
- Date: November 23, 2019
- Host city: (Indiana) Terre Haute, IN
- Distances: 10 km–Men; 6 km–Women

The 2019 NCAA Division I Cross Country Championships was the 81st annual NCAA Men's Division I Cross Country Championship and the 39th annual NCAA Women's Division I Cross Country Championship to determine the team and individual national champions of NCAA Division I men's and women's collegiate cross country running in the United States. In all, four different titles were contested: men's and women's individual and team championships.

== Women's title ==
- Distance: 6,000 meters
- (DC) = Defending champions

=== Women's Team Result (Top 10) ===
| PL | Team | Total Time | Average Time | Score | 1 | 2 | 3 | 4 | 5 | 6 | 7 |
|---|---|---|---|---|---|---|---|---|---|---|---|
| 1st place, gold medalist(s) | Arkansas | 1:42:27.40 | 20:29.48 | 96 | 3 | 4 | 16 | 21 | 52 | 57 | 142 |
| 2nd place, silver medalist(s) | BYU | 1:42:49.90 | 20:33.98 | 102 | 5 | 6 | 7 | 41 | 43 | 80 | 125 |
| 3rd place, bronze medalist(s) | Stanford | 1:43:19.90 | 20:39.98 | 123 | 8 | 11 | 20 | 38 | 46 | 69 | 158 |
| 4 | New Mexico | 1:43:12.60 | 20:38.52 | 168 | 1 | 9 | 27 | 40 | 91 | 170 | 189 |
| 5 | NC State | 1:44:11.90 | 20:50.38 | 190 | 10 | 17 | 39 | 49 | 75 | 100 | 171 |
| 6 | Michigan State | 1:44:37.70 | 20:55.54 | 209 | 24 | 26 | 34 | 35 | 90 | 105 | 201 |
| 7 | Wisconsin | 1:44:17.50 | 20:51.50 | 235 | 2 | 19 | 37 | 70 | 107 | 122 | 194 |
| 8 | Air Force | 1:45:07.10 | 21:01.42 | 259 | 28 | 30 | 44 | 51 | 106 | 113 | 153 |
| 9 | Furman | 1:45:06.60 | 21:01.32 | 290 | 13 | 15 | 58 | 65 | 139 | 193 | 211 |
| 10 | Colorado (DC) | 1:45:29.90 | 21:05.98 | 294 | 29 | 33 | 64 | 73 | 95 | 152 | 178 |

=== Women's Individual Result (Top 10) ===
| Rank | Name | Team | Time |
|---|---|---|---|
| 1st place, gold medalist(s) | (Eritrea) Weini Kelati | New Mexico | 19:47.5 |
| 2nd place, silver medalist(s) | (United States) Alicia Monson | Wisconsin | 19:57.1 |
| 3rd place, bronze medalist(s) | (United States) Katie Izzo | Arkansas | 19:59.3 |
| 4 | (United States) Taylor Werner | Arkansas | 20:11.1 |
| 5 | (United States) Courtney Wayment | BYU | 20:16.1 |
| 6 | (United States) Erica Birk | BYU | 20:16.1 |
| 7 | (United States) Whittni Orton | BYU | 20:17.0 |
| 8 | (United States) Ella Donaghu | Stanford | 20:17.9 |
| 9 | (Kenya) Ednah Kurgat | New Mexico | 20:18.4 |
| 10 | (United States) Elly Henes | NC State | 20:20.7 |

== Men's title ==
- Distance: 10,000 meters

=== Men's Team Result (Top 10) ===
| PL | Team | Total Time | Average Time | Score | 1 | 2 | 3 | 4 | 5 | 6 | 7 |
|---|---|---|---|---|---|---|---|---|---|---|---|
| 1st place, gold medalist(s) | BYU | 2:35:42.90 | 31:08.58 | 109 | 3 | 14 | 17 | 36 | 39 | 73 | 126 |
| 2nd place, silver medalist(s) | Northern Arizona (DC) | 2:36:43.30 | 31:20.66 | 163 | 18 | 28 | 31 | 40 | 46 | 55 | 125 |
| 3rd place, bronze medalist(s) | Colorado | 2:36:16.10 | 31:15.22 | 164 | 2 | 7 | 32 | 48 | 75 | 113 | 124 |
| 4 | Iowa State | 2:36:52.20 | 31:22.44 | 211 | 1 | 37 | 45 | 62 | 66 | 79 | 143 |
| 5 | Tulsa | 2:37:36.11 | 31:31.22 | 243 | 10 | 12 | 67 | 70 | 84 | 164 | 204 |
| 6 | Stanford | 2:37:39.50 | 31:31.90 | 248 | 20 | 29 | 30 | 83 | 86 | 152 | 195 |
| 7 | Michigan | 2:37:47.20 | 31:33.44 | 250 | 13 | 34 | 38 | 80 | 85 | 102 | 153 |
| 8 | Notre Dame | 2:37:58.70 | 31:35.74 | 269 | 24 | 41 | 44 | 59 | 101 | 106 | 107 |
| 9 | Oregon | 2:38:10.70 | 31:38.14 | 307 | 6 | 60 | 63 | 64 | 114 | 117 | 144 |
| 10 | Portland | 2:38:33.70 | 31:42.74 | 314 | 26 | 43 | 68 | 82 | 95 | 110 | 155 |

=== Men's Individual Result (Top 10) ===
| Rank | Name | Team | Time |
|---|---|---|---|
| 1st place, gold medalist(s) | (Kenya) Edwin Kurgat | Iowa State | 30:32.7 |
| 2nd place, silver medalist(s) | (United States) Joe Klecker | Colorado | 30:37.1 |
| 3rd place, bronze medalist(s) | (United States) Conner Mantz | BYU | 30:40.0 |
| 4 | (United States) Peter Seufer | Virginia Tech | 30:40.1 |
| 5 | (Kenya) Vincent Kiprop | Alabama | 30:43.5 |
| 6 | (United States) Cooper Teare | Oregon | 30:49.2 |
| 7 | (United States) John Dressel | Colorado | 30:52.2 |
| 8 | (Kenya) Amon Kemboi | Campbell | 30:55.9 |
| 9 | (Kenya) Gilbert Kigen | Alabama | 30:57.2 |
| 10 | (United States) Jaret Carpenter | Purdue | 30:58.7 |

== See also ==
- NCAA Men's Division II Cross Country Championship
- NCAA Women's Division II Cross Country Championship
- NCAA Men's Division III Cross Country Championship
- NCAA Women's Division III Cross Country Championship
