= Gary Sokolow =

American politician

Member of the South Dakota House of Representatives from the 17th district
- In office January 14, 1997 – January 12, 1999
- Succeeded by: H. Junior Engbrecht; Judy Clark

Personal details
- Born: November 17, 1955 (age 70) Fort Lauderdale, Florida
- Party: Democratic

Gary Sokolow (born November 17, 1955) is an American politician who served in the South Dakota House of Representatives from the 17th district from 1997 to 1999.
