= Thomas Costigan =

American gridiron football player (born 1997)

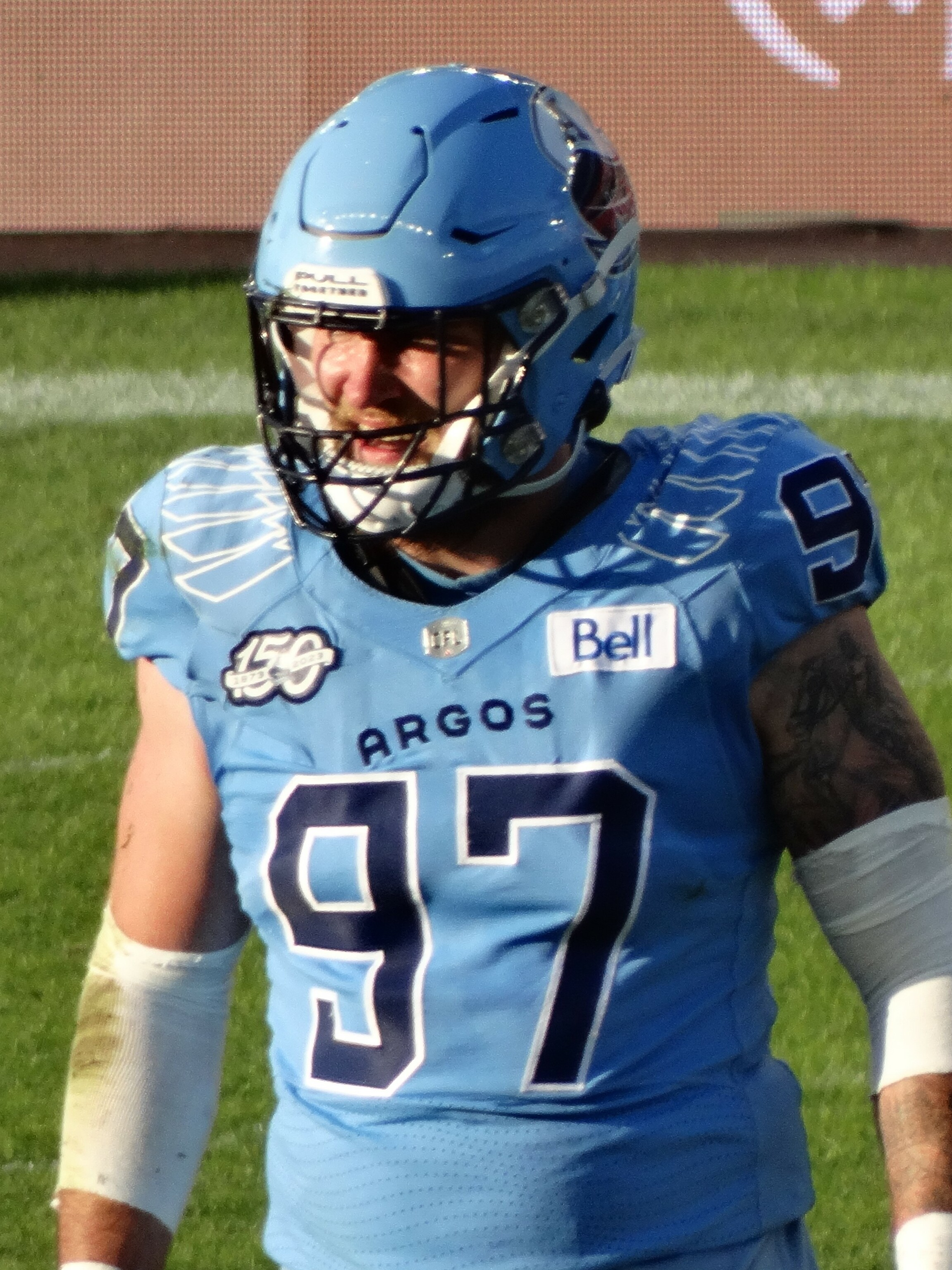
- Costigan with the Toronto Argonauts in 2023

Profile
- Position: Defensive lineman

Personal information
- Born: August 26, 1997 (age 29); Stamford, Connecticut, U.S.
- Listed height: 6 ft 3 in (1.91 m)
- Listed weight: 245 lb (111 kg)

Career information
- High school: Trinity Catholic High (Connecticut)
- College: Bryant

Career history
- 2019: Los Angeles Chargers*
- 2020–2022: Edmonton Elks
- 2022: Montreal Alouettes
- 2023: Toronto Argonauts
- * Offseason or practice squad member only
- Stats at CFL.ca

Thomas Costigan (born August 26, 1997) is an American professional football defensive lineman. He previously played in the Canadian Football League (CFL).

== College career ==
Costigan played college football for the Bryant Bulldogs from 2015 to 2018. He played in 44 games, starting 29, where he had 285 total tackles, 46.5 tackles for a loss, 26 sacks, three interceptions, 13 forced fumbles, three fumble recoveries, and one blocked kick.

== Professional career ==
=== Los Angeles Chargers ===
Costigan signed with the Los Angeles Chargers as an undrafted free agent on August 12, 2019. He was released with final roster cuts.

=== Edmonton Elks ===
Costigan signed as a free agent with the Edmonton Eskimos on February 7, 2020. However, he did not play in 2020 due to the cancellation of the 2020 CFL season. Following training camp in 2021, he made the active roster for the newly named Edmonton Elks and made his professional debut on August 7, 2021, against the Ottawa Redblacks. He played in 11 regular season games that year where he recorded 24 defensive tackles and lead the team with six sacks. In 2022, Costigan again played in 11 regular season games for the Elks where he had 14 defensive tackles, three special teams tackles, and three sacks.

=== Montreal Alouettes ===
On August 31, 2022, Costigan was traded to the Montreal Alouettes along with Nafees Lyon for Avery Ellis and a third-round pick in the 2023 CFL draft. He played in seven games for the Alouettes where he had three defensive tackles, one special teams tackle, one sack, and two forced fumbles. He became a free agent upon the expiry of his contract on February 14, 2023.

=== Toronto Argonauts ===
On the first day of free agency, on February 14, 2023, it was announced that Costigan had signed with the Toronto Argonauts. He played in 13 regular season games where he had 17 defensive tackles, six sacks, and two forced fumbles. He was released on February 14, 2024, after the team re-signed Shawn Oakman.

== Personal life ==
Costigan was born to parents Patricia Brennan and Thomas Costigan.
