= Edwin Kurgat =

Kenyan long-distance runner

Personal information
- Born: 19 May 1996 (age 30) Eldoret, Uasin Gishu County, Kenya
- Education: St. Patrick's High School; Iowa State University

Sport
- Country: Kenya
- Sport: Track and field
- Events: 3000 m, 5000 m, 10,000 m
- College team: Iowa State
- Club: UA Mission Dark Sky
- Turned pro: 2021
- Coached by: Stephen Haas
Medal record
Men's athletics
Representing the Kenya
Olympic Games
2024 Paris	5000 m
World Championships
2025 Tokyo	10,000 m

Edwin Kurgat (born 19 May 1996) is a Kenyan long-distance runner who competes for UA Mission Run Dark Sky. He won the 2019 NCAA Division I Cross Country Championships while competing for Iowa State.

Kurgat attended St. Patrick's High School in Iten, Kenya, and didn't begin running until 2016. He initially attended UT Martin, before transferring to Iowa State in 2018.

On 26 January 2024, Kurgat ran a personal best time of 12:57.52 in the indoor 5000 metres at the John Thomas Terrier Classic in Boston. This met the Olympic standard of 13:05.00.

== Career ==
Representing Kenya
Year	Competition	Venue	Position	Event	Notes
2024	Olympic Games	Paris, France	7th	5,000 m	13:17.18
2025	World Championships	Tokyo, Japan	7th	10,000 m	28:57.83
2026	Commonwealth Games	Glasgow, United Kingdom	4th	10,000 m	27:50.98

Grand Slam Track results
Slam	Race group	Event	Pl.	Time	Prize money
2025 Philadelphia Slam	Long distance	3000 m	6th	8:04.18	US$7,500

== Personal bests ==
Outdoor

- 1500 metres – 3:45.57 (Des Moines 2023)
- Mile – 3:58.62 (Ames, IA 2020)
- 5000 metres – 13:08.46 (Los Angeles 2023)
- 10,000 metres – 26:51.54 (Eugene 2024)

Indoor

- Mile – 4:06.05 (Boston 2018)
- 3000 metres – 7:49.19 (New York 2020)
- 5000 metres – 12:57.52 (Boston 2024)

Road

- 5K – 13:27 (Boston 2023)
- 10K – 28:01 (Boston 2023)
