= Cravont Charleston =

American track and field athlete (born 1998)

Personal information
- Born: January 2, 1998 (age 28) Charlotte, North Carolina, US
- Education: Mallard Creek High School

Sport
- Country: United States
- Sport: Athletics
- Event(s): 100 m, 200 m
- College team: North Carolina State University

Achievements and titles
- Personal bests: 100 m: 9.90 (Kuortane, Finland 2023); 200 m: 20.16 (Jacksonville 2021)

Cravont Charleston (born January 2, 1998) is an American track and field athlete who competes as a sprinter. In 2023, he became the US national champion over 100 metres.

== Early life ==
Charleston was born on January 2, 1998, in Charlotte, North Carolina. He attended Mallard Creek High School, and in senior year in 2016, was the NCHSAA 4A state champion in the indoor 55 m and outdoor 100 m. He was also the 2016 Charlotte Observer indoor track runner of the year. Charleston competed in college at North Carolina State University.

== Career ==
Competing to qualify at the US Olympic trials for the delayed 2020 Tokyo Olympics, Charleston ran 10.23s for the 100m without qualifying from the heats on June 19, 2021. A year later he ran 10.07 in the heats for the US qualifying for the 2022 World Athletics Championships. He improved in the semi-final to 10.05 and finished eleventh. In the 200m he finished twelfth with a time of 20.50 at Hayward Field in Eugene, Oregon.

Charleston broke the 10-second barrier for the 100m for the first time in June 2022, in Geneva, when he ran 9.98 at the Geneva International event.

Charleston ran a wind assisted 100m of 9.87 in April 2023 at the Mt. SAC Relays in Hilmer Lodge Stadium. The following month he ran a new personal best for the 100 metres on May 27, 2023, when he ran 9.91s in Los Angeles.

Competing at the 2023 USA Outdoor Track and Field Championships, in Eugene, Oregon, Charleston won the 100m competition, running 9.95s to edge out Christian Coleman and Noah Lyles. He was selected for the 2023 World Athletics Championships in Budapest in August 2023.
