= Thomas Fafard =

Canadian long-distance runner

Personal information
- Born: December 6, 1998 (age 27) Repentigny, Quebec, Canada

Sport
- Sport: Athletics (track and field)

Achievements and titles
- Personal bests: 13:05.07 (5000 metres); 28:39.29 (10,000 metres)
Medal record
Men's Athletics
Representing Canada
NACAC Championships
Silver medal – second place	2022 Nassau	5000 metres
Pan American U20 Championships
Silver medal – second place	2017 Trujillo	5000 metres

Thomas Fafard (born December 6, 1998) is a Canadian track and field athlete competing in the long-distance events.

== Career ==
At the 2017 Pan American U20 Athletics Championships in Trujillo, Peru, Fafard won the silver medal in the 5000 metres event. Fafard's first major senior international medal came in 2022, when he won the silver medal in the 5000 metres at the 2022 NACAC Championships in Nassau, Bahamas. Fafard also won silver at the 2022 Pan American Cross-Country Championships in Brazil.

=== 2024 season ===
In April 2024, Fafard won the Vancouver Sun Run. In May 2024, Fafard ran a personal best of 13:05.07 in the 5000 metres, just shy of the Olympic standard by 0.07 seconds. In June 2024, Fafard made his professional debut, finishing second at the Canadian trials in the 5000 metres. In July 2024, Fafard qualified to compete for Canada at the 2024 Summer Olympics through his world rankings position.
