= Caitlin Collier =

American politician

Member of the South Dakota House of Representatives from the 17th district
- In office January 14, 1997 – January 12, 1999
- Succeeded by: H. Junior Engbrecht; Judy Clark

Personal details
- Born: January 21, 1956 (age 70) Kansas City, Kansas
- Party: Democratic

Caitlin Collier (born January 21, 1956) is an American politician who served in the South Dakota House of Representatives from the 17th district from 1997 to 1999.
