= Argentina at the 2024 Summer Olympics =

- IOC code: ARG
- NOC: Argentine Olympic Committee
- Website: www.coarg.org.ar (in Spanish)

in Paris, France 26 July 2024 – 11 August 2024
- Competitors: 136 (103 men and 33 women) in 23 sports
- Flag bearers (opening): Luciano De Cecco; Rocío Sánchez Moccia
- Flag bearers (closing): José Torres; Eugenia Bosco
- Medals Ranked 52nd: Gold 1 Silver 1 Bronze 1 Total 3

Summer Olympics appearances (overview)
- 1900; 1904; 1908; 1912; 1920; 1924; 1928; 1932; 1936; 1948; 1952; 1956; 1960; 1964; 1968; 1972; 1976; 1980; 1984; 1988; 1992; 1996; 2000; 2004; 2008; 2012; 2016; 2020; 2024; 2028

Argentina competed at the 2024 Summer Olympics in Paris from 26 July to 11 August 2024. Since the nation's official debut in 1900, Argentine athletes have competed in every edition of the Summer Olympic Games except for three occasions: the sparsely attended St. Louis 1904 and Stockholm 1912; and Moscow 1980 as part of the United States-led boycott.

On 3 July 2024, the Argentine Olympic Committee appointed the volleyball player Luciano De Cecco and the field hockey player Rocío Sánchez Moccia as the flag bearers to opening ceremony.

== Medalists ==
Medal	Name	Sport	Event	Date
Gold	José Torres	Cycling	Men's BMX freestyle	31 July
Silver	Mateo Majdalani; Eugenia Bosco	Sailing	Mixed Nacra 17	8 August
Bronze	Argentina women's national field hockey team: Sofía Toccalino Agustina Gorzelany Valentina Raposo Agostina Alonso Agustina Albertario María José Granatto Cristina Cosentino Rocío Sánchez Moccia Victoria Sauze Sofía Cairó Eugenia Trinchinetti Lara Casas Juana Castellaro Pilar Campoy Julieta Jankunas Zoe Díaz	Field hockey	Women's tournament	9 August

== Competitors ==
The following is the list of number of competitors in the Games.

Sport	Men	Women	Total
Archery	1	0	1
Athletics	3	3	6
Canoeing	1	1	2
Cycling	3	0	3
Equestrian	1	0	1
Fencing	1	0	1
Field hockey	16	16	32
Football	18	0	18
Golf	2	0	2
Handball	14	0	14
Judo	0	1	1
Modern pentathlon	1	0	1
Rowing	2	2	4
Rugby sevens	12	0	12
Sailing	3	4	7
Shooting	2	1	3
Skateboarding	2	0	2
Swimming	1	2	3
Table tennis	1	0	1
Taekwondo	1	0	1
Tennis	6	2	8
Triathlon	0	1	1
Volleyball	12	0	12
Total	103	33	136

== Archery ==
For the first time since 1988, Argentina qualified one archer for the 2024 Summer Olympics men's individual recurve competition through the 2024 Olympic Continental Qualifier for the Americas, held in Medellín, Colombia.

Athlete	Event	Ranking round		Round of 64	Round of 32	Round of 16	Quarterfinals	Semifinals	Final / BM	
Athlete	Event	Score	Seed	Opposition Score	Opposition Score	Opposition Score	Opposition Score	Opposition Score	Opposition Score	Rank
Damián Jajarabilla	Men's individual	643	52	Sadikov (UZB); L 2–6	Did not advance					

== Athletics ==
Argentinian track and field athletes achieved the entry standards for Paris 2024, either by passing the direct qualifying mark (or time for track and road races) or by world ranking, in the following events (a maximum of 3 athletes each):

Key

- Note–Ranks given for track events are within the athlete's heat only
- Q = Qualified for the next round
- q = Qualified for the next round as a fastest loser or, in field events, by position without achieving the qualifying target
- NR = National record
- N/A = Round not applicable for the event
- Bye = Athlete not required to compete in round

Track and road events

Athlete	Event	Preliminary		Heat		Repechage		Semifinal		Final	
Athlete	Event	Time	Rank	Time	Rank	Time	Rank	Time	Rank	Time	Rank
Elián Larregina	Men's 400 m	—N/a		47.80	44	45.36	5 Q	45.02	6	Did not advance	
Belén Casetta	Women's 3000 m steeplechase	—N/a		9:34.78	34	—N/a				Did not advance	
Florencia Borelli	Women's marathon	—N/a								2:29:29	21
Daiana Ocampo	Women's marathon	—N/a								2:32:02	41

Field events

Athlete	Event	Qualification		Final	
Athlete	Event	Result	Rank	Result	Rank
Nazareno Sasia	Men's shot put	19.33	23	Did not advance	
Joaquín Gómez	Men's hammer throw	72.10	22	Did not advance	

== Canoeing ==
=== Sprint ===
Argentinian canoeists qualified two boat in the following distances for the Games through the 2023 ICF Canoe Sprint World Championships in Duisburg, Germany; and 2024 Pan American Canoe Sprint Olympic Qualifiers in Sarasota, United States.

Athlete	Event	Heats		Quarterfinals		Semifinals		Final	
Athlete	Event	Time	Rank	Time	Rank	Time	Rank	Time	Rank
Agustín Vernice	Men's K-1 1000 m	3:27.18	2 SF	Bye		3:28.18	2 FA	3:28.10	4
Brenda Rojas	Women's K-1 500 m	1:52.68	2 SF	Bye		1:53.35	6 FC	1:53.88	20

Qualification Legend: SF = Qualify to semifinal; FA = Qualify to final (medal); FB = Qualify to final B (non-medal); FC =Qualify to final C (non-medal)

== Cycling ==
=== Road ===
Argentina entered one male rider to compete in the men's road race events at the Olympic, after secured those quota through the UCI Nation Ranking.

Athlete	Event	Time	Rank
Eduardo Sepúlveda	Men's road race	6:28:31	54

=== BMX ===
==== Freestyle ====
Riders from Argentina received a single quota spot in the men's BMX freestyle for Paris 2024, finishing among the top three eligible nations, not yet qualified, at the 2023 UCI BMX Freestyle World Championships in Glasgow, Great Britain.

Athlete	Event	Qualification				Final		
Athlete	Event	Run 1	Run 2	Average	Rank	Run 1	Run 2	Rank
José Torres	Men's	86.24	87.08	86.66	7 Q	94.82	92.12	1st place, gold medalist(s)

==== Race ====
Argentina secured one quota place (one men's) race for Paris 2024 through the allocations of final Olympic BMX ranking.

Athlete	Event	Quarterfinal		Last chance repechage		Semifinal		Final	
Athlete	Event	Points	Rank	Time	Rank	Points	Rank	Result	Rank
Gonzalo Molina	Men's	19	20 q	35.097	6	Did not advance			

== Equestrian ==
Argentina entered one rider in jumping events, into the games, by virtue of top three nations performances in individual jumping events, not yet qualified, at the 2023 Pan American Games in Santiago, Chile.

=== Jumping ===
Athlete	Horse	Event	Qualification			Final			Jump-off		
Athlete	Horse	Event	Penalties	Time	Rank	Penalties	Time	Rank	Penalties	Time	Rank
José María Larocca	Finn Lente	Individual	4.00	73.33	29 Q	20.00	81.82	25	Did not advance		

== Fencing ==
Argentina entered one male fencer into the Olympic competition. Pascual di Tella secured his quota places in men's sabre events, after nominated as the highest ranked individual fencers, eligible for Pan Am zone through the release of the FIE Official ranking for Paris 2024.

Athlete	Event	Round of 64	Round of 32	Round of 16	Quarterfinal	Semifinal	Final / BM
Athlete	Event	Opposition Score	Opposition Score	Opposition Score	Opposition Score	Opposition Score	Opposition Score
Pascual di Tella	Men's sabre	Cauchon (CAN); W 15–13	El-Sissy (EGY); L 11–15	Did not advance			

== Field hockey ==
Summary

Key:

- FT – After full-time.
- P – Match decided by penalty-shootout.

Team	Event	Group stage						Quarterfinal	Semifinal	Final / BM	
Team	Event	Opposition Score	Opposition Score	Opposition Score	Opposition Score	Opposition Score	Rank	Opposition Score	Opposition Score	Opposition Score	Rank
Argentina men's	Men's tournament	Australia; L 0–1	India; D 1–1	New Zealand; W 2–0	Ireland; W 2–1	Belgium; D 3–3	4 Q	Germany; L 2–3	Did not advance		8
Argentina women's	Women's tournament	United States; W 4–1	South Africa; W 4–2	Spain; W 2–1	Australia; D 3–3	Great Britain; W 3–0	2 Q	Germany; W 1–1 (2–0 pso)	Netherlands; L 0–3	Belgium; W 2–2 (3–1 pso)	3rd place, bronze medalist(s)

=== Men's tournament ===
Argentina men's national field hockey team qualified by winning the gold medal at the 2023 Pan American Games.

Team roster

Argentina announced their final squad on 7 June 2024.

Head coach: Mariano Ronconi

No.	Pos.	Player	Date of birth (age)	Caps	Club
1	GK	Tomás Santiago	15 June 1992 (aged 32)	79	(Belgium) Herakles
4	DF	Juan Catán	5 October 1995 (aged 28)	79	(Argentina) Hurling
7	MF	Nicolás Keenan	6 May 1997 (aged 27)	75	(Netherlands) Klein Zwitserland
9	FW	Maico Casella	5 June 1997 (aged 27)	134	(Argentina) San Fernando
10	DF	Nicolás Della Torre	1 March 1990 (aged 34)	108	(Belgium) Dragons
11	MF	Lucas Toscani	22 September 1999 (aged 24)	60	(Netherlands) Laren
17	MF	Santiago Tarazona	31 May 1996 (aged 28)	120	(Argentina) GEBA
18	DF	Federico Monja	12 September 1993 (aged 30)	79	(Argentina) Banco Provincia
21	FW	Tomas Domene	4 September 1997 (aged 26)	77	(Belgium) Orée
22	MF	Matías Rey (Captain)	1 December 1984 (aged 39)	286	(Argentina) San Fernando
23	FW	Lucas Martínez	17 November 1993 (aged 30)	132	(Belgium) Dragons
26	FW	Agustín Mazzilli	20 June 1989 (aged 35)	270	(Argentina) Lomas
27	DF	Tadeo Marcucci	3 May 2001 (aged 23)	32	(Argentina) Lomas
29	MF	Thomas Habif	27 May 1996 (aged 28)	75	(Germany) Harvestehuder THC
30	MF	Agustín Bugallo	23 April 1995 (aged 29)	131	(Argentina) Mitre
31	FW	Bautista Capurro	22 October 2003 (aged 20)	28	(Argentina) Ciudad
41	DF	Iñaki Minadeo	9 June 2003 (aged 21)	8	(Argentina) Banco Provincia

Group play

Pos	Team	Pld	W	D	L	GF	GA	GD	Pts	Qualification
1	Belgium	5	4	1	0	15	7	+8	13	Advance to quarter-finals
2	India	5	3	1	1	10	7	+3	10	Advance to quarter-finals
3	Australia	5	3	0	2	12	10	+2	9	Advance to quarter-finals
4	Argentina	5	2	2	1	8	6	+2	8	Advance to quarter-finals
5	Ireland	5	1	0	4	4	9	−5	3	
6	New Zealand	5	0	0	5	4	14	−10	0	

Source: FIH
Rules for classification: 1) points; 2) matches won; 3) goal difference; 4) goals for; 5) head-to-head result; 6) field goals scored.

27 July 2024
13:15
v

Australia	1–0	Argentina
Govers 30+'	Report

Pitch 2
Umpires:
Coen van Bunge (NED)
Ben Göntgen (GER)

29 July 2024
12:45
v

India	1–1	Argentina
Harmanpreet 59'	Report	Martínez 22'

Pitch 1
Umpires:
Daniel Barstow (GBR)
Zeke Newman (AUS)

30 July 2024
17:00
v

Argentina	2–0	New Zealand
Domene 24'; Martínez 60'	Report

Pitch 1
Umpires:
Jonas van 't Hek (NED)
Sean Rapaport (RSA)

1 August 2024
13:15
v

Argentina	2–1	Ireland
Domene 17'; Casella 28'	Report	Cole 27'

Pitch 2
Umpires:
Raghu Prasad (IND)
Marcin Grochal (POL)

2 August 2024
17:30
v

Belgium	3–3	Argentina
De Kerpel 34'; Hendrickx 52'; Stockbroekx 60'	Report	Casella 5'; Domene 45'; Rey 53'

Pitch 2
Umpires:
Steve Rogers (AUS)
Martin Madden (GBR)

Quarterfinal

4 August 2024
20:00
v

Germany	3–2	Argentina
Hinrichs 9'; Peillat 24'; Weigand 54'	Report	Casella 11'; Mazilli 48'

Pitch 1
Umpires:
Zeke Newman (AUS)
David Tomlinson (NZL)

=== Women's tournament ===
Argentina women's national field hockey team qualified by winning the gold medal at the 2023 Pan American Games.

Team roster

The squad was announced on 14 June 2024.

Head coach: Fernando Ferrara

No.	Pos.	Player	Date of birth (age)	Caps	Goals	Club
2	MF	Sofía Toccalino	20 March 1997 (aged 27)	168	12	(Argentina) St. Catherine's
3	DF	Agustina Gorzelany	11 March 1996 (aged 28)	116	70	(Argentina) San Martín
4	DF	Valentina Raposo	28 January 2003 (aged 21)	51	8	(Argentina) River Plate
5	MF	Agostina Alonso	1 October 1995 (aged 28)	157	7	(Argentina) Banco Nación
7	FW	Agustina Albertario	1 January 1993 (aged 31)	227	62	(Argentina) Lomas
10	FW	María Granatto	21 April 1995 (aged 29)	205	104	(Argentina) Santa Bárbara
13	GK	Cristina Cosentino	22 December 1997 (aged 26)	40	0	(Argentina) Banco Nación
17	MF	Rocío Sánchez Moccia (Captain)	2 August 1988 (aged 35)	320	20	(Argentina) Puerto Nizuc
18	MF	Victoria Sauze	21 July 1991 (aged 33)	147	4	(Argentina) River Plate
20	MF	Sofía Cairó	8 October 2002 (aged 21)	27	4	(Argentina) Mariano Moreno
22	FW	Eugenia Trinchinetti	17 July 1997 (aged 27)	179	38	(Argentina) San Fernando
23	FW	Lara Casas	22 June 2004 (aged 20)	9	1	(Argentina) Italiano
25	DF	Juana Castellaro	29 March 2005 (aged 19)	21	0	(Argentina) River Plate
26	MF	Pilar Campoy	6 October 1990 (aged 33)	96	24	(Argentina) Hacoaj
28	FW	Julieta Jankunas	20 January 1999 (aged 25)	170	65	(Argentina) Universitario de Córdoba
33	FW	Zoe Díaz	5 June 2006 (aged 18)	6	0	(Argentina) Italiano

Group play

Pos	Team	Pld	W	D	L	GF	GA	GD	Pts	Qualification
1	Australia	5	4	1	0	15	5	+10	13	Quarter-finals
2	Argentina	5	4	1	0	16	7	+9	13	Quarter-finals
3	Spain	5	2	1	2	6	7	−1	7	Quarter-finals
4	Great Britain	5	2	0	3	8	12	−4	6	Quarter-finals
5	United States	5	1	1	3	5	13	−8	4	
6	South Africa	5	0	0	5	4	10	−6	0	

Source: FIH
Rules for classification: 1) points; 2) matches won; 3) goal difference; 4) goals for; 5) head-to-head result; 6) field goals scored.

27 July 2024
19:45
v

Argentina	4–1	United States
Sánchez Moccia 18'; Gorzelany 29'; Jankunas 44'; Díaz 47'	Report	Sessa 33'

Pitch 1
Umpires:
Aleisha Neumann (AUS)
Wanri Venter (RSA)

29 July 2024
17:30
v

South Africa	2–4	Argentina
Louw 15'; De Waal 29'	Report	Gorzelany 17', 49', 52'; Jankunas 53'

Pitch 2
Umpires:
Ayanna McClean (TTO)
Laurine Delforge (BEL)

31 July 2024
10:00
v

Argentina	2–1	Spain
Gorzelany 6'; Trinchinetti 21'	Report	Riera 34'

Pitch 1
Umpires:
Hannah Harrison (GBR)
Alison Keogh (IRE)

1 August 2024
20:15
v

Argentina	3–3	Australia
Casas 10'; Sauze 10'; Granatto 50'	Report	Nobbs 37'; Kershaw 45+'; Williams 60'

Pitch 2
Umpires:
Wanri Venter (RSA)
Amber Church (NZL)

3 August 2024
10:00
v

Great Britain	0–3	Argentina
	Report	Raposo 34'; Albertario 35'; Díaz 55'

Pitch 1
Umpires:
Laurine Delforge (BEL)
Emi Yamada (JPN)

Quarterfinal

5 August 2024
12:30
v

Argentina	1–1	Germany
Jankunas 59'	Report; Penalty shootout report	Huse 57'
Penalties
Casas (penalty shoot-out missed); Jankunas (penalty shoot-out scored); Díaz (penalty shoot-out scored)	2–0	(penalty shoot-out missed) Weidemann; (penalty shoot-out missed) Huse; (penalty shoot-out missed) Schröder; (penalty shoot-out missed) Zimmermann

Pitch 1
Umpires:
Laurine Delforge (BEL)
Aleisha Neumann (AUS)

Semifinal

7 August 2024
14:00
v

Netherlands	3–0	Argentina
Fokke 21'; Nunnink 26'; Jansen 35'	Report

Pitch 1
Umpires:
Laurine Delforge (BEL)
Sarah Wilson (GBR)

Bronze medal game

9 August 2024
14:00
v

(bronze) Argentina	2–2	Belgium
Gorzelany 22'; Albertarrio 27'	Report; Penalty shootout report	Puvrez 8'; Rasir 27'
Penalties
Casas (penalty shoot-out scored); Jankunas (penalty shoot-out missed); Díaz (penalty shoot-out scored); Cairo (penalty shoot-out scored)	3–1	(penalty shoot-out missed) Englebert; (penalty shoot-out missed) Blockmans; (penalty shoot-out scored) Rasir; (penalty shoot-out missed) Vanden Borre

Pitch 1
Umpires:
Amber Church (NZL)
Alison Keogh (IRE)

== Football ==
Summary

Key:

- A.E.T – After extra time.
- P – Match decided by penalty-shootout.

Team	Event	Group Stage				Quarterfinal	Semifinal	Final / BM	
Team	Event	Opposition Score	Opposition Score	Opposition Score	Rank	Opposition Score	Opposition Score	Opposition Score	Rank
Argentina men's	Men's tournament	Morocco; L 1–2	Iraq; W 3–1	Ukraine; W 2–0	2 Q	France; L 0–1	Did not advance		7

=== Men's tournament ===
Argentina men's football team qualified for the Olympics following the triumph of the nation's runner-up title at the 2024 CONMEBOL Pre-Olympic Tournament in Venezuela.

Team roster

Argentina announced their final squad on 3 July 2024.

Head coach: Javier Mascherano

No.	Pos.	Player	Date of birth (age)	Club
1	GK	Gerónimo Rulli*	20 May 1992 (aged 32)	(Royal Dutch Football Association) Ajax
2	DF	Marco Di Cesare	30 January 2002 (aged 22)	(Argentine Football Association) Racing
3	DF	Julio Soler	16 February 2005 (aged 19)	(Argentine Football Association) Lanus
4	DF	Joaquín García	21 August 2001 (aged 22)	(Argentine Football Association) Vélez Sarsfield
5	MF	Ezequiel Fernández	25 July 2002 (aged 21)	(Argentine Football Association) Boca Juniors
6	DF	Bruno Amione	3 January 2002 (aged 22)	(Mexican Football Federation) Santos Laguna
7	MF	Kevin Zenón	30 July 2001 (aged 22)	(Argentine Football Association) Boca Juniors
8	MF	Cristian Medina	1 June 2002 (aged 22)	(Argentine Football Association) Boca Juniors
9	FW	Julián Álvarez*	31 January 2000 (aged 24)	(The Football Association) Manchester City
10	FW	Thiago Almada	26 April 2001 (aged 23)	(United States Soccer Federation) Atlanta United
11	MF	Claudio Echeverri	2 January 2006 (aged 18)	(Argentine Football Association) River Plate
12	GK	Leandro Brey	21 September 2002 (aged 21)	(Argentine Football Association) Boca Juniors
13	DF	Gonzalo Luján	21 April 2001 (aged 23)	(Argentine Football Association) San Lorenzo
14	MF	Santiago Hezze	22 October 2001 (aged 22)	(Hellenic Football Federation) Olympiacos
15	FW	Luciano Gondou	22 June 2001 (aged 23)	(Argentine Football Association) Argentinos Juniors
16	DF	Nicolás Otamendi* (captain)	12 February 1988 (aged 36)	(Portuguese Football Federation) Benfica
17	FW	Giuliano Simeone	18 December 2002 (aged 21)	(Royal Spanish Football Federation) Alavés
18	FW	Lucas Beltrán	29 March 2001 (aged 23)	(Italian Football Federation) Fiorentina

* Overage player.

Group stage

Pos	Team	Pld	W	D	L	GF	GA	GD	Pts	Qualification
1	Morocco	3	2	0	1	6	3	+3	6 (Note: Head-to-head points: Morocco 3, Argentina 0.)	Advance to knockout stage
2	Argentina	3	2	0	1	6	3	+3	6	Advance to knockout stage
3	Ukraine	3	1	0	2	3	5	−2	3	
4	Iraq	3	1	0	2	3	7	−4	3	

Source: FIFA
Rules for classification: Group stage tiebreakers
Notes:
24 July 2024
15:00

Argentina	1–2	Morocco
Simeone 68'	Report	Rahimi 45+2', 51' (pen.)

Stade Geoffroy-Guichard, Saint-Étienne
Attendance: 26,717
Referee: Glenn Nyberg (Sweden)

27 July 2024
15:00

Argentina	3–1	Iraq
Almada 14'; Gondou 62'; Fernández 85'	Report	Hussein 45+5'

Stade de Lyon, Décines-Charpieu
Attendance: 30,008
Referee: Espen Eskås (Norway)

30 July 2024
17:00

Ukraine	0–2	Argentina
	Report	Almada 47'; Echeverri 90+1'

Stade de Lyon, Décines-Charpieu
Attendance: 10,017
Referee: Dahane Beida (Mauritania)

Quarterfinals

2 August 2024
21:00

France	1–0	Argentina
Mateta 5'	Report

Stade de Bordeaux, Bordeaux
Attendance: 37,153
Referee: Ilgiz Tantashev (Uzbekistan)

== Golf ==
Argentina entered two golfers into the Olympic tournament. Emiliano Grillo and Alejandro Tosti, both qualified directly to Paris 2024, based on their ranking position in the top 60 on the IGF World Rankings.

Men

Athlete	Event	Round 1	Round 2	Round 3	Round 4	Total		
Athlete	Event	Score	Score	Score	Score	Score	Par	Rank
Alejandro Tosti	Individual	68	69	69	70	276	−8	T18
Emiliano Grillo	Individual	66	75	75	68	284	E	T43

== Handball ==
Summary

Key:

- ET: After extra time
- P – Match decided by penalty-shootout.

Team	Event	Group Stage						Quarterfinal	Semifinal	Final / BM	
Team	Event	Opposition Score	Opposition Score	Opposition Score	Opposition Score	Opposition Score	Rank	Opposition Score	Opposition Score	Opposition Score	Rank
Argentina men's	Men's tournament	Norway; L 31–36	Hungary; L 25–35	Denmark; L 27–38	France; L 21–28	Egypt; L 27–34	6	Did not advance			12

=== Men's tournament ===
Argentina men's national handball team qualified for the Olympics by winning the gold medal at the 2023 Pan American Games in Viña del Mar, Chile.

Team roster

A 17-player roster was announced on 7 June 2024.

Head coach: Guillermo Milano

No.	Pos.	Name	Date of birth (age)	Height	App.	Goals	Club
2	LW	Federico Gastón Fernández	17 October 1989 (aged 34)	1.87 m	218	790	(Argentina) San Fernando
3	RB	Federico Pizarro	7 September 1986 (aged 37)	1.85 m	252	825	(Spain) BM Ciudad Encantada
4	CB	Nicolás Bono	16 August 1997 (aged 26)	1.79 m	24	43	(France) Istres Provence
6	CB	Diego Simonet	26 December 1989 (aged 34)	1.89 m	137	429	(France) Montpellier Handball
7	LW	Ignacio Pizarro	8 February 1990 (aged 34)	1.78 m	94	307	(Spain) BM Ciudad Encantada
8	CB	Pablo Simonet	4 May 1992 (aged 32)	1.85 m	150	332	(Spain) BM Puente Genil
11	P	Lucas Moscariello	19 February 1992 (aged 32)	1.90 m	106	223	(Spain) BM Benidorm
14	RB	Andrés Moyano	28 July 1996 (aged 27)	1.92 m	27	57	(Spain) BM Granollers
18	LB	Guillermo Fischer	18 July 1996 (aged 28)	2.00 m	57	51	(Spain) BM Villa de Aranda
19	CB	Pedro Martínez Cami	20 December 1999 (aged 24)	1.90 m	59	127	(Portugal) Benfica
22	P	Gastón Mouriño	12 October 1994 (aged 29)	1.92 m	69	118	(Romania) CSM Constanța
23	LB	James Parker	9 June 1994 (aged 30)	1.87 m	41	75	(Spain) Balonmano Alicante
40	GK	Leonel Maciel	4 January 1989 (aged 35)	1.92 m	131	17	(Spain) CD Bidasoa
77	LB	Nicolás Bonanno	18 November 1991 (aged 32)	1.98 m	93	67	(Spain) Club Balonmano Nava
87	GK	Juan Bar	29 June 1987 (aged 37)	1.90 m	85	5	(Spain) BM Valladolid

Group play

Pos	Team	Pld	W	D	L	GF	GA	GD	Pts	Qualification
1	Denmark	5	5	0	0	165	133	+32	10	Quarterfinals
2	Egypt	5	3	1	1	148	140	+8	7	Quarterfinals
3	Norway	5	3	0	2	139	136	+3	6	Quarterfinals
4	France (H)	5	2	1	2	129	131	−2	5	Quarterfinals
5	Hungary	5	1	0	4	137	138	−1	2	
6	Argentina	5	0	0	5	131	171	−40	0	

Source: Olympics Paris 2024 rankings
Rules for classification: 1) Points; 2) Head-to-head points; 3) Head-to-head goal difference; 4) Head-to-head goals scored; 5) Goal difference; 6) Goals scored; 7) Draw.
(H) Hosts

27 July 2024; 16:00	Norway	36–31	Argentina	Paris Expo Porte de Versailles, Paris; Attendance: 5,749; Referees: Horáček, Novotný (CZE)
27 July 2024; 16:00	Grøndahl 8	(22–15)	D. Simonet 5	Paris Expo Porte de Versailles, Paris; Attendance: 5,749; Referees: Horáček, Novotný (CZE)
27 July 2024; 16:00	1× (red card)	Report	3× (suspension)	Paris Expo Porte de Versailles, Paris; Attendance: 5,749; Referees: Horáček, Novotný (CZE)

29 July 2024; 21:00	Argentina	25–35	Hungary	Paris Expo Porte de Versailles, Paris; Attendance: 5,602; Referees: Schulze, Tönnies (GER)
29 July 2024; 21:00	P. Simonet 5	(12–17)	Imre 7	Paris Expo Porte de Versailles, Paris; Attendance: 5,602; Referees: Schulze, Tönnies (GER)
29 July 2024; 21:00	4× (suspension) 2× (red card)	Report	3× (suspension)	Paris Expo Porte de Versailles, Paris; Attendance: 5,602; Referees: Schulze, Tönnies (GER)

31 July 2024; 21:00	Denmark	38–27	Argentina	Paris Expo Porte de Versailles, Paris; Attendance: 5,780; Referees: Belkhiri, Hamidi (ALG)
31 July 2024; 21:00	Gidsel 13	(19–14)	Parker 6	Paris Expo Porte de Versailles, Paris; Attendance: 5,780; Referees: Belkhiri, Hamidi (ALG)
31 July 2024; 21:00	5× (suspension)	Report	2× (yellow card) 4× (suspension) 1× (red card)	Paris Expo Porte de Versailles, Paris; Attendance: 5,780; Referees: Belkhiri, Hamidi (ALG)

2 August 2024; 11:00	Argentina	21–28	France	Paris Expo Porte de Versailles, Paris; Attendance: 5,764; Referees: Pavićević, Ražnatović (MNE)
2 August 2024; 11:00	Parker 7	(8–15)	Descat 8	Paris Expo Porte de Versailles, Paris; Attendance: 5,764; Referees: Pavićević, Ražnatović (MNE)
2 August 2024; 11:00	4× (suspension)	Report	1× (yellow card) 1× (suspension)	Paris Expo Porte de Versailles, Paris; Attendance: 5,764; Referees: Pavićević, Ražnatović (MNE)

4 August 2024; 11:00	Egypt	34–27	Argentina	Paris Expo Porte de Versailles, Paris; Attendance: 5,808; Referees: Bíró, Kiss (HUN)
4 August 2024; 11:00	S. El-Deraa, Zein 6	(14–15)	F. Pizarro 6	Paris Expo Porte de Versailles, Paris; Attendance: 5,808; Referees: Bíró, Kiss (HUN)
4 August 2024; 11:00	4× (suspension)	Report	1× (suspension)	Paris Expo Porte de Versailles, Paris; Attendance: 5,808; Referees: Bíró, Kiss (HUN)

== Judo ==
Argentina qualified one judoka for the following weight class at the Games. Sofía Fiora (women's half-lightweight, 52 kg) got qualified via continental quota based on Olympic point rankings.

Athlete	Event	Round of 64	Round of 32	Round of 16	Quarterfinals	Semifinals	Repechage	Final / BM	
Athlete	Event	Opposition Result	Opposition Result	Opposition Result	Opposition Result	Opposition Result	Opposition Result	Opposition Result	Rank
Sofía Fiora	Women's −52 kg	—N/a	Ndiaye (SUI); L 00–10	Did not advance					

== Modern pentathlon ==
Argentinian modern pentathletes confirmed a single quota place for Paris 2024. Franco Serrano secured one of two available South American berth in the men's event at the 2023 Pan American Games in Santiago, Chile.

Athlete	Event		Fencing (épée one touch)				Swimming (200 m freestyle)			Riding (show jumping)			Combined: shooting/running (10 m laser pistol)/(3000 m)			Total points	Final rank
Athlete	Event		RR	BR	Rank	MP points	Time	Rank	MP points	Penalties	Rank	MP points	Time	Rank	MP points	Total points	Final rank
Franco Serrano	Men's	Semifinal	200	2	13	202	2:02.56	9	305	56.58	15	286	10:40.88	15	660	1453	28
Franco Serrano	Men's	Final	Did not advance														

== Rowing ==
Argentinian rowers qualified two boats, each in the men's and women's lightweight double sculls for the Games, through the 2024 Americas Qualification Regatta in Rio de Janeiro, Brazil.

Athlete	Event	Heats		Repechage		Quarterfinals		Semifinals		Final	
Athlete	Event	Time	Rank	Time	Rank	Time	Rank	Time	Rank	Time	Rank
Alejandro Colomino; Pedro Dickson	Men's lightweight double sculls	7:04.34	6 R	6:52.94	3 SA/B	—N/a		6:51.59	6 FB	6:31.86	12
Sonia Baluzzo; Evelyn Silvestro	Women's lightweight double sculls	7:36.43	6 R	7:29.76	3 SA/B	—N/a		7:33.41	6 FB	7:25.86	12

Qualification Legend: FA=Final A (medal); FB=Final B (non-medal); FC=Final C (non-medal); FD=Final D (non-medal); FE=Final E (non-medal); FF=Final F (non-medal); SA/B=Semifinals A/B; SC/D=Semifinals C/D; SE/F=Semifinals E/F; QF=Quarterfinals; R=Repechage

== Rugby sevens ==
Summary

Team	Event	Pool round				Quarterfinal	Semifinal	Final/BM	
Team	Event	Opposition Score	Opposition Score	Opposition Score	Rank	Opposition Score	Opposition Score	Opposition Score	Rank
Argentina men's	Men's tournament	Kenya; W 31–12	Samoa; W 28–12	Australia; L 14–22	2 Q	France; L 14–26	New Zealand; L 12–17	United States; W 19–0	7

=== Men's tournament ===
Argentina national rugby sevens team qualified for the Olympics by securing a top-four placement in the 2022–23 World Rugby Sevens Series, defeating Great Britain at the end of the pool round in the Toulouse leg.

Team roster

Argentina's squad of 12 players was named on 28 June 2024. Additionally, Rodrigo Isgró and Santiago Vera Feld were named as traveling reserves.

Head coach: Santiago Gómez Cora

No.	Player	Date of birth (age)
1	Joaquín Pellandini	27 May 1999 (aged 25)
2	Tomás Elizalde	18 November 2002 (aged 21)
3	Germán Schulz	5 February 1994 (aged 30)
4	Matteo Graziano	21 July 2001 (aged 23)
5	Agustín Fraga	6 March 2002 (aged 22)
6	Santiago Álvarez (c)	17 February 1994 (aged 30)
7	Tobías Wade	6 August 1999 (aged 24)
8	Gastón Revol	26 November 1986 (aged 37)
9	Matías Osadczuk	22 April 1997 (aged 27)
10	Santiago Mare	21 October 1996 (aged 27)
11	Luciano González	10 April 1997 (aged 27)
12	Marcos Moneta	7 March 2000 (aged 24)
13	Rodrigo Isgró	24 March 1999 (aged 25)
14	Santiago Vera Feld	29 March 2001 (aged 23)

Group stage

Pos	Team	Pld	W	D	L	PF	PA	PD	Pts	Qualification
1	Australia	3	3	0	0	64	35	+29	9	Advance to Quarter-finals
2	Argentina	3	2	0	1	73	46	+27	7	Advance to Quarter-finals
3	Samoa	3	1	0	2	52	49	+3	5	
4	Kenya	3	0	0	3	19	78	−59	3	

Source: World Rugby
Rules for classification: 1) Points; 2) Head-to-head result; 3) Point difference; 4) Points scored.

24 July 2024
16:00

Argentina	31–12	Kenya
Try: Fraga (2) 7' m, 8' c Elizalde 10' c González 14' c Moneta 15' m Con: Pellandini (2/3) 8', 12'; Mare (1/1) 14'	World Rugby	Try: Ojwang 4' c Wekesa 9' m Con: Mboya (1/2) 5'

Stade de France, Paris
Attendance: 69,000
Referee: AJ Jacobs (South Africa)

24 July 2024
19:30

Argentina	28–12	Samoa
Try: Osadczuk (2) 2' c, 9' c Graziano 5' c Pellandini 7' c Con: Pellandini (4/4) 2', 6', 8', 9'	World Rugby	Try: Apelu Maliko 11' c Leitufia 14' m Con: Leitufia (1/2) 11'

Stade de France, Paris
Attendance: 69,000
Referee: Francisco González (Uruguay)

25 July 2024
14:30

Argentina	14–22	Australia
Try: Schulz 2' c Osadczuk 11' c Con: Pellandini (2/2) 2', 11'	World Rugby	Try: Hutchison 7' m Dowling 8' m Roache 9' m Malouf 13' c Con: Roache (1/4) 13'

Stade de France, Paris
Attendance: 70,000
Referee: Adam Leal (England)

Quarter-final

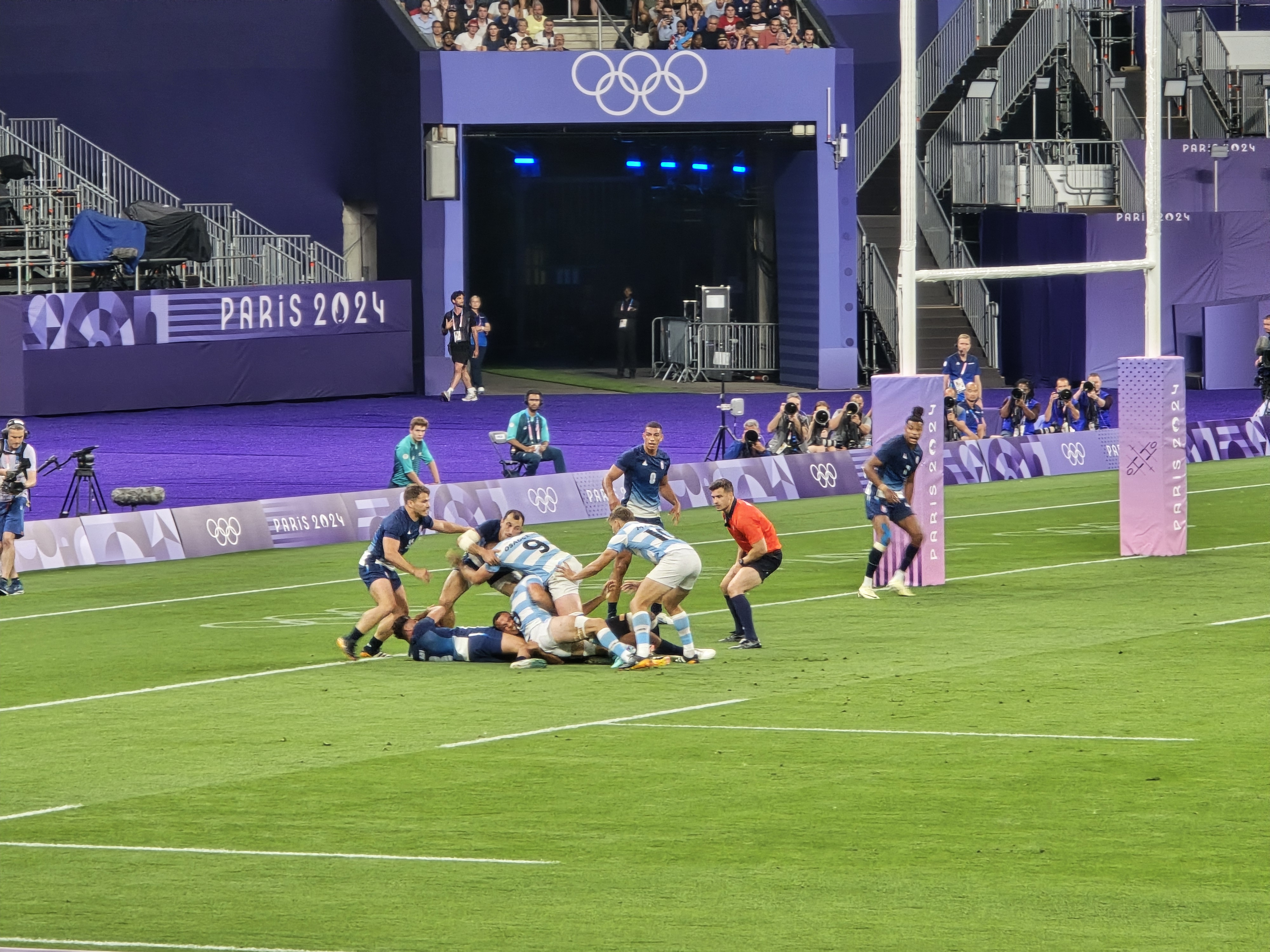
Argentina attacking the try line against France

25 July 2024
21:30

Argentina	14–26	France
Try: Isgró 9' c Moneta 12' c Con: Mare (1/1) 9'; Pellandini (1/1) 12',	World Rugby	Try: Timo 4' c Grandidier Nkanang (2) 4' c, 7' c Dupont 15' m Con: Rebbadj (3/3) 4', 6', 8'

Stade de France, Paris
Attendance: 70,000
Referee: Jordan Way (Australia)

5–8th place playoff semi-final

27 July 2024
14:30

New Zealand	17–12	Argentina
Try: Rokolisoa 1' c Leo 14' m Knewstubb 19'; Con: Rokolisoa (1/1) 3'	World Rugby	Try: Wade 6' c González 11' m Con: Wade (1/2) 7'

Stade de France, Paris
Referee: Ben Breakspear (Wales/Great Britain)

7th place final

27 July 2024
18:00

Argentina	19–0	United States
Try: Osadczuk (2) 7' c, 9' c Isgro 13' m Con: Wade (2/2) 8', 9'	World Rugby

Stade de France, Paris
Referee: Nick Hogan (New Zealand)

== Sailing ==
Argentine sailors qualified one boat in each of the following classes through the 2023 Sailing World Championships in The Hague, Netherlands, 2023 Pan American Games in Santiago, Chile, and 2024 ILCA 6 World Championships in Mar del Plata.

Elimination events

Athlete	Event	Opening series																						Quarterfinal	Semifinal								Final							
Athlete	Event	1	2	3	4	5	6	7	8	9	10	11	12	13	14	15	16	17	18	19	20	Net points	Rank	Rank	1	2	3	4	5	6	Total	Rank	1	2	3	4	5	6	Total	Rank
Francisco Saubidet	Men's IQFoil	17	4	17	15	19	~~25~~	15	13	17	18	21	~~23~~	19	Cancelled							175	21	Did not advance																21
Chiara Ferretti	Women's IQFoil	19	21	19	21	~~24~~	22	14	20	23	21	24	19	~~25~~	19	Cancelled						242	24	Did not advance																24
Catalina Turienzo	Women's Formula Kite	13	13	~~19~~	14	13	3	Cancelled														56	Did not advance																13	

Medal race events

Athlete	Event	Race													Net points	Final rank
Athlete	Event	1	2	3	4	5	6	7	8	9	10	11	12	M*	Net points	Final rank
Francisco Guaragna Rigonat	Men's ILCA 7	28	26	24	DSQ	6	18	24	23	C	C	—N/a		EL	149	27
Lucía Falasca	Women's ILCA 6	~~35~~	11	14	33	11	5	10	16	2	C	—N/a		EL	102	11
Mateo Majdalani; Eugenia Bosco	Mixed Nacra 17	2	2	5	10	6	6	3	2	2	1	2	~~12~~	14	55	2nd place, silver medalist(s)

M = Medal race; EL = Eliminated – did not advance into the medal race; C = Canceled

== Shooting ==
Argentinian shooters achieved quota places for the following events based on their results at 2024 Championships of the Americas and 2023 Pan American Games.

Athlete	Event	Qualification		Final	
Athlete	Event	Points	Rank	Points	Rank
Julián Gutiérrez	Men's 10 m air rifle	631.7	2 Q	122.8	8
Federico Gil	Men's skeet	115	27	Did not advance	
Fernanda Russo	Women's 10 m air rifle	625.4	30	Did not advance	
Julián Gutiérrez; Fernanda Russo	Mixed 10 m air rifle team	624.8	19	Did not advance	

== Skateboarding ==
For the first time ever, Argentina qualified two male skateboarders to compete in the following event at the Games, based on the release of the final Olympic ranking.

Men

Athlete	Event	Qualification		Final	
Athlete	Event	Score	Rank	Score	Rank
Matías Dell Olio	Street	266.8	5	153.98	8
Mauro Iglesias	Street	249.09	10	Did not advance	

== Swimming ==
Argentinian swimmers achieved entry standards in the following events for Paris 2024 (a maximum of two swimmers under the Olympic Qualifying Time (OST) and potentially at the Olympic Consideration Time (OCT)):

Athlete	Event	Heat		Semifinal		Final	
Athlete	Event	Time	Rank	Time	Rank	Time	Rank
Ulises Saravia	Men's 100 m backstroke	55.03	35	Did not advance			
Agostina Hein	Women's 400 m freestyle	4:14.24	18	Did not advance			
Agostina Hein	Women's 800 m freestyle	8:37.43	14	Did not advance			
Macarena Ceballos	Women's 100 m breaststroke	1:06.89	16 Q	1:07.31	15	Did not advance	
Macarena Ceballos	Women's 200 m breaststroke	2:26.55	18	Did not advance			

== Table tennis ==
Argentina entered one table tennis player into Paris 2024. Santiago Lorenzo qualified for the games following the triumph of winning the first quota places at the 2024 Pan American Qualification Tournament in Lima, Peru.

Athlete	Event	Preliminary	Round of 64	Round of 32	Round of 16	Quarterfinals	Semifinals	Final / BM	
Athlete	Event	Opposition Result	Opposition Result	Opposition Result	Opposition Result	Opposition Result	Opposition Result	Opposition Result	Rank
Santiago Lorenzo	Men's singles	—N/a	Lebrun (FRA); L 0–4	Did not advance					

== Taekwondo ==
Argentina qualified one athlete to compete at Paris 2024. Lucas Guzmán secured his spot by virtue of winning the semifinal match, through the 2024 Pan American Qualification Tournament, in Santo Domingo, Dominican Republic.

Athlete	Event	Qualification	Round of 16	Quarterfinals	Semifinals	Repechage	Final / BM	
Athlete	Event	Opposition Result	Opposition Result	Opposition Result	Opposition Result	Opposition Result	Opposition Result	Rank
Lucas Guzmán	Men's −58 kg	—N/a	Salim (HUN); L 0–6, 5–3, 0–3	Did not advance				

== Tennis ==
Argentina initially entered two tennis players into the Olympic tournament. Facundo Díaz Acosta secured an outright berth by winning the men's singles title and María Lourdes Carlé secured an outright berth in the women's singles by advancing to the final match at the 2023 Pan American Games in Santiago, Chile.

Díaz Acosta was originally qualified as a Pan American Games champion, however, he was removed from the list after the four highest-ranked players got direct entries via the ATP rankings of 10 June 2024, as well as doubles players Máximo González and Andrés Molteni. 2019 Pan American Games champion Nadia Podoroska, the highest ranked Argentine woman player, will join Carlé in the participation list.

Men

Athlete	Event	Round of 64	Round of 32	Round of 16	Quarterfinal	Semifinal	Final / BM	
Athlete	Event	Opposition Result	Opposition Result	Opposition Result	Opposition Result	Opposition Result	Opposition Result	Rank
Sebastián Báez	Singles	Monteiro (BRA); W 6–4, 6–3	Hassan (LBN); W 6–2, 3–6, 7–6^{(7–3)}	Tsitsipas (GRE); L 5–7, 1–6	Did not advance			
Francisco Cerúndolo	Singles	Barrios Vera (CHI); W 6–2, 6–1	Humbert (FRA); W 7–5, 6–7^{(5–7)}, 7–5	Ruud (NOR); L 3–6, 4–6	Did not advance			
Tomás Martín Etcheverry	Singles	Seyboth Wild (BRA); W 7–6^{(9–7)}, 6–2	Safiullin (AIN); L 0–6, 6–7^{(1–7)}	Did not advance				
Mariano Navone	Singles	Borges (POR); W 6–2, 6–2	Musetti (ITA); L 6–7^{(2–7)}, 3–6	Did not advance				
Tomás Martín Etcheverry; Mariano Navone	Doubles	—N/a	Haase / Rojer (NED); L 6–7^{(3–7)}, 6–7^{(4–7)}	Did not advance				
Máximo González; Andrés Molteni	Doubles	–	Alcaraz / Nadal (ESP); L 6–7^{(4–7)}, 4–6	Did not advance				

Women

Athlete	Event	Round of 64	Round of 32	Round of 16	Quarterfinal	Semifinal	Final / BM	
Athlete	Event	Opposition Result	Opposition Result	Opposition Result	Opposition Result	Opposition Result	Opposition Result	Rank
María Lourdes Carlé	Singles	Maria (GER); W 6–0, 6–0	Gauff (USA); L 1–6, 1–6	Did not advance				
Nadia Podoroska	Singles	Parry (FRA); L 6–7^{(6–8)}, 5–7	Did not advance					
María Lourdes Carlé; Nadia Podoroska	Doubles	—N/a	Korpatsch / Maria (GER); W 6–3, 6–0	Bucșa / Sorribes Tormo (ESP); L 3–6, 4–6	Did not advance			

Mixed

Athlete	Event	Round of 16	Quarterfinals	Semifinals	Final / BM	
Athlete	Event	Opposition Score	Opposition Score	Opposition Score	Opposition Score	Rank
Nadia Podoroska; Máximo González	Doubles	Gauff / Fritz (USA); L 1–6, 7–6^{(8–6)}, [5–10]	Did not advance			

== Triathlon ==
Argentina achieved a quota (one woman) for the women's individual triathlon competition at the 2024 Summer Olympics through the Individual Olympic Qualification Ranking.

Individual

Athlete	Event	Time						Rank
Athlete	Event	Swim (1.5 km)	Trans 1	Bike (40 km)	Trans 2	Run (10 km)	Total	Rank
Romina Biagioli	Women's	24:09	0:56	1:01:12	0:33	38:46	2:05:36	47

== Volleyball ==
=== Indoor ===
Summary

Team	Event	Group stage				Quarterfinal	Semifinal	Final / BM	
Team	Event	Opposition Score	Opposition Score	Opposition Score	Rank	Opposition Score	Opposition Score	Opposition Score	Rank
Argentina men's	Men's tournament	United States; L 0–3	Japan; L 1–3	Germany; L 0–3	4	Did not advance			11

==== Men's tournament ====
Argentina men's volleyball team qualified by their rank in the World Ranking qualification pathway.

Team roster

The roster was announced on 3 July 2024.

Head coach: Marcelo Méndez

- 1 Matías Sánchez S
- 3 Jan Martínez Franchi OH
- 7 Facundo Conte OH
- 8 Agustín Loser MB
- 9 Santiago Danani L
- 12 Bruno Lima OP
- 15 Luciano De Cecco (c) S
- 16 Pablo Kukartsev OP
- 17 Luciano Vicentín OH
- 18 Martín Ramos MB
- 21 Luciano Palonsky OH
- 22 Nicolás Zerba MB

Group play

Pos	Team	Pld	W	L	Pts	SW	SL	SR	SPW	SPL	SPR	Qualification
1	United States	3	3	0	8	9	3	3.000	270	232	1.164	Quarterfinals
2	Germany	3	2	1	6	8	5	1.600	287	264	1.087	Quarterfinals
3	Japan	3	1	2	4	6	7	0.857	278	292	0.952	Quarterfinals
4	Argentina	3	0	3	0	1	9	0.111	196	243	0.807	

Source: Olympics
Rules for classification: Tiebreakers

27 July 2024; 21:00	United States	3–0	Argentina	South Paris Arena 1, Paris; Attendance: 9,464; Referees: Stefano Cesare (ITA), Wojciech Maroszek (POL)
27 July 2024; 21:00	(25–20, 25–19, 25–16); P2 Report			South Paris Arena 1, Paris; Attendance: 9,464; Referees: Stefano Cesare (ITA), Wojciech Maroszek (POL)

31 July 2024; 13:00	Japan	3–1	Argentina	South Paris Arena 1, Paris; Attendance: 9,474; Referees: Wojciech Maroszek (POL), Vladimir Simonović (SUI)
31 July 2024; 13:00	(25–16, 25–22, 18–25, 25–23); P2 Report			South Paris Arena 1, Paris; Attendance: 9,474; Referees: Wojciech Maroszek (POL), Vladimir Simonović (SUI)

2 August 2024; 09:00	Argentina	0–3	Germany	South Paris Arena 1, Paris; Attendance: 9,455; Referees: Fabrice Collados (FRA), Hamid Al-Rousi (UAE)
2 August 2024; 09:00	(13–25, 21–25, 21–25); P2 Report			South Paris Arena 1, Paris; Attendance: 9,455; Referees: Fabrice Collados (FRA), Hamid Al-Rousi (UAE)

== See also ==
- Argentina at the 2024 Winter Youth Olympics
