= Buenos Aires Hockey Association =

Buenos Aires Field Hockey Amateur Association
- Asociación Amateur de Hockey sobre Césped de Buenos Aires
- Sport: Field hockey
- Jurisdiction: Regional
- Abbreviation: AAHBA
- Affiliation: CAH
- Affiliation date: 1983
- Headquarters: Buenos Aires, Argentina
- President: Candelaria Moirano
- Vice president: Rodolfo Schmitt
- Secretary: Néstor Burman

Official website
- buenosaireshockey.ar
- (Argentina)

The Buenos Aires Field Hockey Amateur Association (Spanish: Asociación Amateur de Hockey sobre Césped de Buenos Aires, abbreviated AAHBA) is the Argentine amateur sports governing body that regulates the practice of field hockey over the Buenos Aires Province including the autonomous city of Buenos Aires.

The AAHBA organises its championships since 1908. The body is affiliated to Argentine Hockey Confederation (CAH) as a founding member of the confederation in 1983.

The most important tournaments organized by the AAHBA are the Women's and Men's Torneo Metropolitano.

== Affiliated clubs ==
Nowadays the AAHBA has registered more than 100 clubs from the Buenos Aires Province and the city of Buenos Aires. Below are some of the most notable members of the body:

- Almirante Brown
- Arsenal de Sarandí
- Atlético y Progreso
- Banco Nación
- Banco Provincia
- Banfield
- Belgrano A.C.
- Boca Juniors
- Buenos Aires Cricket & Rugby Club
- CASA de Padua
- C.A. San Isidro
- Centro Naval
- Champagnat
- Ciudad de Buenos Aires
- DAOM
- Deportiva Francesa
- Ducilo
- Estudiantes (LP)
- Ferro Carril Oeste
- Gimnasia y Esgrima (BA)
- Gimnasia y Esgrima (LP)
- Hindú
- Huracán
- Hurling
- Italiano
- Jockey Club (R)
- Liceo Militar
- Lanús
- Liceo Naval
- Lomas
- Los Andes
- Los Cedros
- Los Matreros
- Manuel Belgrano
- Mitre
- Monte Grande
- Náutico Hacoaj
- Nueva Chicago
- Newman
- Olivos
- Platense
- Pucará
- Pueyrredón
- Quilmes
- Regatas (BV)
- River Plate
- San Albano
- San Andrés
- San Cirano
- San Luis
- San Fernando
- San Lorenzo
- San Martín
- San Patricio
- San Telmo
- San Isidro Club
- SITAS
- Temperley
- Tigre R.C.
- Tristán Suárez
- Universitario (BA)
- Universitario (LP)
- Universitario (R)
- Vélez Sarsfield

== See also ==
- Metropolitano de Hockey (Women)
- Metropolitano de Hockey (Men)
