= Delta Rugby Club =

(Argentina) Delta
- Full name: Delta Rugby Club
- Union: URBA
- Nickname: Yacaré
- Founded: 19 November 2009; 16 years ago
- Location: Tigre, Argentina
- Ground(s): Rincón de Milberg, Tigre, Argentina
- President: Horacio Sanguinetti
- Coach(es): Gastón Boniface; Sergio Torres
- League: URBA Primera B
- 2025: 8th.
1st kit	2nd kit

Delta Rugby Club, or just Delta, is an Argentine amateur sports club located in the Tigre district of Greater Buenos Aires. The rugby union team currently plays in Primera División B, the second division of the URBA league system. Founded in 2009, Delta is the newest rugby club taking part in the union tournaments.

The club has also a field hockey section, affiliated to the Buenos Aires Hockey Association.

== History ==
After rugby union was introduced at the club San Fernando played at the highest level of the Unión de Rugby de Buenos Aires championship until 2009, when after disputing the Top14 of Torneo de la URBA the club punished five players of the first division, banning them for periods from three months to two years. Due to that suspension the club could not play the seven tournament.

The banned players left San Fernando to establish a new club, so "Delta Rugby Club" was founded on 19 November 2009 and started to play at Grupo IV, the lowest division of the Unión de Rugby de Buenos Aires.

With a team dismantled because of the exodus of its most notable players one year before, San Fernando made a poor campaign in the 2010 championship and was relegated to Grupo II (the second division) where it currently plays.

Delta RC played its home games in a field property of Club San Patricio until 2011, when the club opened its own facilities, which included a field. The installations are located in Rincón de Milberg, a division of Tigre Partido.

In 2013, Delta promoted to the first división when only four years had passed since its foundation. The team achieved its goal after defeating San Albano by 42–27.
