= Club Ferrocarril Mitre =

Argentine sports club

Ferrocarril Mitre
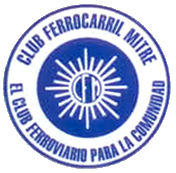
- Full name: Club Deportivo; Ferrocarril General Mitre
- Nickname(s): Ferroviario
- League: Torneo Metropolitano (Men's/Women's)
- Founded: April 24, 1924; 101 years ago
- Home ground: Gral. Savio 3000, Villa Maipú, San Martín Partido

Personnel
- Chairman: Omar Maturano
Home

Club Deportivo Ferrocarril General Mitre, or simply Ferrocarril Mitre, is an Argentine sports club located in the Miguelete district of General San Martín Partido, Greater Buenos Aires.

Ferrocarril Mitre is mostly known for its men's and women's field hockey teams, who took part in the Torneo Metropolitano organized by the Buenos Aires Hockey Association. The male team is the most successful club in Provincial hockey with 18 titles won to date. The club also hosts the practise of handball, association football, golf and tennis.

Ferrocarril Mitre's main rival is San Fernando.

== History ==
The club was founded by British immigrants as "Club Central Argentino de Migueletes", then changing its name to "Ferrocarril Central Argentino" (for the Central Argentine Railway, one of the lines that served the suburban area of Buenos Aires Province).

With the nationalization of the railways in Argentina in 1948, all the lines changed their names to honor notable presidents of the country. The "Central Argentino" was renamed "Ferrocarril General Bartolomé Mitre" in honor of military officer and historian Bartolomé Mitre, and the club changed its name as well.

The men's team was finalist in the 2013 Torneo Metropolitano after defeating San Fernando but then Mitre would lose the championship at the hands of Banco Provincia.

The women's team was about to be relegated in 2013, but they defeated San Isidro Club by 1–0, remaining in the first division.

== Titles ==
Men

- Torneo Metropolitano (18): 1941, 1943, 1945, 1946, 1947, 1952, 1957, 1959, 1961,
  1963, 1965, 1968, 1972, 1974, 1989, 1993, 1998, 2010

Women

- Torneo Metropolitano (3): 1990, 1994, 1995

== Bibliography ==
- Historia del Hockey en Argentina on HSRA website: Part 1, Part 2, Part 3, Part 4, Part 5, by Eric Weil, Aug 2011
