= Metropolitano de Hockey (women) =

Metropolitano (Women's)
- First season: 1924; 102 years ago
- Administrator: AHBA
- No. of teams: 14
- Country: Argentina
- Headquarters: Buenos Aires
- Most recent champion: Santa Bárbara (2026)
- Most titles: Lomas (20 titles)
- Broadcaster: ESPN
- Website: buenosaireshockey.ar

The Metropolitano de Hockey Femenino is a women's field hockey competition contested by clubs from the Buenos Aires Province of Argentina. Played since 1924, it is regulated by the Buenos Aires Hockey Association (AHBA).

== Formula ==
The Torneo Metropolitano is one of the country's two main club competitions; the other is the Liga Nacional de Hockey (LHN) played by teams not only from Buenos Aires but from the rest of Argentina.

The championship is disputed by 14 teams grouped in a unique zone. All teams played a double round-robin tournament of 13 fixtures each (home and away). At the end of the season, the first six teams qualify for the playoffs, where two teams will be eliminated. The next stage is the semi-finals, and then the final match.

== Current teams (2027) ==
Club	Neighborhood	Region	Est.	Tit.
Arquitectura	San Martín	Greater Buenos Aires	1927	0
Banco Nación	Vicente López	Greater Buenos Aires	1909	4
Banco Provincia	Vicente López	Greater Buenos Aires	1918	1
Belgrano	Belgrano	Buenos Aires city	1896	4
Ciudad de Buenos Aires	Núñez	Buenos Aires city	1920	5
Gimnasia y Esgrima (BA)	Palermo	Buenos Aires city	1880	9
Italiano	Caballito	Buenos Aires city	1898	0
Lomas	Lomas de Zamora	Greater Buenos Aires	1891	20
Quilmes	Quilmes	Greater Buenos Aires	1887	18
Regatas Bella Vista	Bella Vista	Greater Buenos Aires	1895	0
River Plate	Belgrano	Buenos Aires city	1901	1
San Fernando	San Fernando	Greater Buenos Aires	1923	5
Santa Bárbara	Manuel B. Gonnet	Buenos Aires Province	1974	1
St. Catherine's Moorlands	Tortuguitas	Greater Buenos Aires	1969	0

== List of champions ==
The chart below includes all the titles won by women's teams.

Season	Champion
1924	Quilmes Girls (Note: Not to be confused with Quilmes Atlético Club.) (1)
1925	Quilmes (1)
1926	Quilmes (2)
1927	Quilmes (3)
1928	Quilmes (4)
1929	Quilmes (5)
1930	Quilmes (6)
1931	Quilmes (7)
1932	Quilmes (8)
1933	Pacific RAC (Note: Current "Club San Martín".)(1)
1934	Arrows (1)
1935	Pacific RAC (2)
1936	Pacific RAC (3)
1937	Arrows (2)
1938	Lomas (1)
1939	Arrows (3)
1940	Arrows (4)
1941	Pacific RAC (4)
1942	Belgrano (1)
1943	CA San Isidro (1)
1944	CA San Isidro (2)
1945	Arrows (5)
1946	Belgrano (2)
1947	Pacific RAC (5)
1948	San Isidro Club (1)
1949	Belgrano (3)
1950	San Isidro Club (2)
1951	San Isidro Club (3)
1952	Quilmes (9)
1953	San Isidro Club (4)
1954	Quilmes (10)
1955	Quilmes (11)
1956	Quilmes (12)
1957	Quilmes (13)
1958	Quilmes (14)
1959	Hurling (1)
1960	Quilmes (15)
1961	Quilmes (16)
1962	Surí (1)
1963	Surí (2) (Note: That was the last championship won by Surí. In 1966 the team merged to Buenos Aires Cricket & Rugby Club.)
1964	Quilmes (17)
1965	Gimnasia y Esgrima (BA) (1)
1966	CA San Isidro (3)
1967	CA San Isidro (4)
1968	Banco Nación (1)
1969	CA San Isidro (5)
1970	Banco Nación (2)
1971	Atlético del Rosario (1)
1972	Hurling (2)
1973	Banco Nación (3)
1974	Belgrano (4)
1975	Atlético del Rosario (2)
1976	Buenos Aires CRC (1)
1977	Lomas (2)
1978	Hurling (3)
1979	Lomas (3)
1980	Buenos Aires CRC (2)
1981	Buenos Aires CRC (3)
1982	San Fernando (1)
1983	Lomas (4)
1984	Lomas (5)
1985	Lomas (6)
1986	Lomas (7)
1987	Buenos Aires CRC (4)
1988	Buenos Aires CRC (5)
1989	Lomas (8)
1990	Ferrocarril Mitre (1)
1991	Lomas (9)
1992	Lomas (10)
1993	Lomas (11)
1994	Ferrocarril Mitre (2)
1995	Ferrocarril Mitre (3)
1996	Lomas (12)
1997	Lomas (13)
1998	Ciudad (1)
1999	Ciudad (2)
2000	Ciudad (3)
2001	Lomas (14)
2002	San Fernando (2)
2003	Lomas (15)
2004	Ciudad (4)
2005	Lomas (16)
2006	Lomas (17)
2007	Gimnasia y Esgrima (BA) (2)
2008	Gimnasia y Esgrima (BA) (3)
2009	Gimnasia y Esgrima (BA) (4)
2010	Gimnasia y Esgrima (BA) (5)
2011	Gimnasia y Esgrima (BA) (6)
2012	Gimnasia y Esgrima (BA) (7)
2013	Gimnasia y Esgrima (BA) (8)
2014	Ciudad (5)
2015	Banco Provincia (1)
2016	River Plate (1)
2017	Gimnasia y Esgrima (BA) (9)
2018	Banco Nación (4)
2019	Lomas (18)
2020	(not held) (Note: Because of the COVID-19 pandemic in Argentina.)
2021	San Fernando (3)
2022	Lomas (19)
2023	San Fernando (4)
2024	Lomas (20)
2025	San Fernando (5)
2026	Santa Bárbara (1)

== Titles by club ==
The teams with most titles is Lomas with 18 championships. Quilmes Girls was a team that only won one championship, the first to be played in 1924.

Team	Titles	Years won
Lomas	20	1938, 1977, 1979, 1983, 1984, 1985, 1986, 1989, 1991, 1992, 1993, 1996, 1997, 2001, 2003, 2005, 2006, 2019, 2022, 2024
Quilmes	18	1925, 1926, 1927, 1928, 1929, 1930, 1931, 1932, 1952, 1954, 1955, 1956, 1957, 1958, 1960, 1961, 1964, 2008
Gimnasia y Esgrima (BA)	9	1965, 2007, 2008, 2009, 2010, 2011, 2012, 2013, 2017
Pacific RAC	5	1933, 1935, 1936, 1941, 1947
Arrows	5	1934, 1937, 1939, 1940, 1945
CA San Isidro	5	1943, 1944, 1966, 1967, 1969
Buenos Aires CRC	5	1976, 1980, 1981, 1987, 1988
Ciudad	5	1998, 1999, 2000, 2004, 2014
San Fernando	5	1982, 2002, 2021, 2023, 2025
San Isidro Club	4	1948, 1950, 1951, 1953
Belgrano	4	1942, 1946, 1949, 1974
Banco Nación	4	1968, 1970, 1973, 2018
Hurling	3	1959, 1972, 1978
Ferrocarril Mitre	3	1990, 1994, 1995
Surí	2	1962, 1963
Atlético del Rosario	2	1971, 1975
Quilmes Girls	1	1924
Banco Provincia	1	2015
River Plate	1	2016
Santa Bárbara	1	2026
