= Metropolitano de Hockey (men) =

Metropolitano (Men's)
- First season: 1908; 118 years ago
- Administrator: AAHBA
- No. of teams: 14
- Country: Argentina
- Headquarters: Buenos Aires
- Most recent champion: Ferrocarril Mitre (2026)
- Most titles: Ferrocarril Mitre (20 titles)
- Broadcaster: ESPN

The Torneo Metropolitano de Hockey Masculino is a men's field hockey competition contested by clubs of the Buenos Aires Province in Argentina. Played since 1908, it is regulated by the Buenos Aires Hockey Association (AHBA).

== Formula ==
The Torneo Metropolitano is one of the country's two main club competitions; the other is the Liga Nacional de Hockey (LHN) played by teams not only from Buenos Aires but from the rest of Argentina.

The championship is disputed by 14 teams that play double round-robin basis in which every team plays all others in its league once at home and once away. At the end of the season, the six teams best placed in the table are allowed to dispute the playoffs, where two teams will be eliminated. The next stage is the semi-finals, and then the final match.

== Current teams (2027) ==
Club	Neighborhood	Region	Est.	Tit.
Banco Provincia	Vicente López	Greater Buenos Aires	1918	11
Ciudad A	Núñez	Buenos Aires city	1920	14
Ducilo	Berazategui	Greater Buenos Aires	1938	0
Gimnasia y Esgrima (BA)	Palermo	Buenos Aires city	1880	5
Hurling	Hurlingham	Greater Buenos Aires	1922	9
Lomas	Lomas de Zamora	Greater Buenos Aires	1891	0
Mitre	General San Martín	Greater Buenos Aires	1924	20
Quilmes A.C.	Quilmes	Greater Buenos Aires	1887	16
San Fernando	San Fernando	Greater Buenos Aires	1923	17
San Fernando B (Note: B team from the same club.)	San Fernando	Greater Buenos Aires	1923	0
San Martín	Sáenz Peña	Greater Buenos Aires	1908	2
Santa Bárbara	La Plata	Greater Buenos Aires	1974	0
Universitario (La Plata)	Manuel B. Gonnet	Buenos Aires Province	1937	0
Vélez Sarsfield	Liniers	Buenos Aires city	1910	0

== List of champions ==
The chart below includes all the titles won by men's teams. In brackets, number of titles won until that date:

Season	Champion
1908	CA San Isidro (1)
1909–20	(not championships held)
1921	CA San Isidro (2)
1922	Quilmes (1)
1923	Quilmes (2)
1924	Quilmes (3)
1925	Buenos Aires Great Southern (1)
1926	CA San Isidro (3)
1927	Buenos Aires Hockey Club (1)
1928	Buenos Aires Great Southern (2)
1929	Pacific Railway (1)
1930	Pacific Railway (2)
1931	Buenos Aires Hockey Club (2)
1932	Buenos Aires Hockey Club (3)
1933	Gimnasia y Esgrima (BA) (1)
1934	Belgrano Hockey Club
1935	Belgrano Hockey Club
1936	Gimnasia y Esgrima (BA) (2)
1937	Quilmes (4)
1938	Quilmes (5)
1939	Quilmes (6)
1940	Quilmes (7)
1941	Ferrocarril Mitre (1)
1942	Quilmes (8)
1943	Ferrocarril Mitre (2)
1944	Quilmes (9)
1945	Ferrocarril Mitre (3)
1946	Ferrocarril Mitre (4)
1947	Ferrocarril Mitre (5)
1948	CA San Isidro (4)
1949	Hurling (1)
1950	Hurling (2)
1951	Hurling (3)
1952	Ferrocarril Mitre (6)
1953	Hurling (4)
1954	Hurling (5)
1955	Hurling (6)
1956	Hurling (7)
1957	Ferrocarril Mitre (7)
1958	San Fernando (1)
1959	Ferrocarril Mitre (8)
1960	San Fernando (2)
1961	Ferrocarril Mitre (9)
1962	San Fernando (3)
1963	Ferrocarril Mitre (10)
1964	San Fernando (4)
1965	Ferrocarril Mitre (11)
1966	San Fernando (5)
1967	San Fernando (6)
1968	Ferrocarril Mitre (12)
1969	Hurling (8)
1970	San Fernando (7)
1971	San Fernando (8)
1972	Ferrocarril Mitre (13)
1973	Gimnasia y Esgrima (BA) (3)
1974	Ferrocarril Mitre (14)
1975	San Fernando (9)
1976	Ciudad (1)
1977	Ciudad (2)
1978	San Fernando (10)
1979	Ciudad (3)
1980	Quilmes (10)
1981	Ciudad (4)
1982	San Fernando (11)
1983	Hurling (9)
1984	Ciudad (5)
1985	Ciudad (6)
1986	Ciudad (7)
1987	Ciudad (8)
1988	Ciudad (9)
1989	Ferrocarril Mitre (15)
1990	Ciudad (10)
1991	Ciudad (11)
1992	Círculo Univ. de Quilmes
1993	Ferrocarril Mitre (16)
1994	Ciudad (12)
1995	Quilmes (11)
1996	Quilmes (12)
1997	Ciudad (13)
1998	Ferrocarril Mitre (17)
1999	Banco Provincia (1)
2000	Banco Provincia (2)
2001	Quilmes (13)
2002	Banco Provincia (3)
2003	San Fernando (12)
2004	Banco Provincia (4)
2005	Quilmes (14)
2006	San Fernando (13)
2007	Quilmes (15)
2008	Quilmes (16)
2009	Gimnasia y Esgrima (BA) (4)
2010	Ferrocarril Mitre (18)
2011	Banco Provincia (5)
2012	Banco Provincia (6)
2013	Banco Provincia (7)
2014	Ciudad (14)
2015	Banco Provincia (8)
2016	Banco Provincia (9)
2017	San Fernando (14)
2018	Banco Provincia (10)
2019	Banco Provincia (11)
2020	(not held) (Note: Because of the COVID-19 pandemic in Argentina.)
2021	San Fernando (15)
2022	Gimnasia y Esgrima (BA) (5)
2023	Ferrocarril Mitre (19)
2024	San Fernando (16)
2025	San Fernando (17)
2026	Ferrocarril Mitre (20)

== Titles by club ==
Club Ferrocarril General Mitre has won the most titles (20 championships), followed by San Fernando with 17 and Quilmes with 16 titles.

Team	Titles	Years won
Ferrocarril Mitre	20	1941, 1943, 1945, 1946, 1947, 1952, 1957, 1959, 1961, 1963, 1965, 1968, 1972, 1974, 1989, 1993, 1998, 2010, 2023, 2026
San Fernando	17	1958, 1960, 1962, 1964, 1966, 1967, 1970, 1971, 1975, 1978, 1982, 2003, 2006, 2017, 2021, 2024, 2025
Quilmes	16	1922, 1923, 1924, 1937, 1938, 1939, 1940, 1942, 1944, 1980, 1995, 1996, 2001, 2005, 2007, 2008
Ciudad	14	1976, 1977, 1979, 1981, 1984, 1985, 1986, 1987, 1988, 1990, 1991, 1994, 1997, 2014
Banco Provincia	11	1999, 2000, 2002, 2004, 2011, 2012, 2013, 2015, 2016, 2018, 2019
Hurling	9	1949, 1950, 1951, 1953, 1954, 1955, 1956, 1969, 1983
Gimnasia y Esgrima (BA)	5	1933, 1936, 1973, 2009, 2022
CA San Isidro	4	1908, 1921, 1926, 1948
Buenos Aires Hockey Club	3	1927, 1931, 1932
Buenos Aires Great Southern	2	1925, 1928
San Martín (Note: Due to the nationalization of Argentine railways during the presidency of Juan Perón in 1947, Pacific Railway changed its name to "Club Atlético Ferrocarril General San Martín".)	2	1929, 1930
