= Sofía Fiora =

Argentina judoka (born 1996)

Personal information
- Born: 8 January 1996 (age 30)
- Occupation: Judoka

Sport
- Country: Italy (until 2021); Argentina (since 2022)
- Sport: Judo
- Weight class: ‍–‍52 kg

Achievements and titles
- Olympic Games: R32 (2024)
- World Champ.: R16 (2024)
- Pan American Champ.: 5th (2023)
Medal record
Women's judo
Representing Italy
European Cadet Championships
Bronze medal – third place	2012 Bar	‍–‍52 kg

Profile at external databases
- IJF: 70253, 13370
- JudoInside.com: 74867
- Updated on 17 November 2025

Sofía Fiora (born 8 January 1996) is an Argentine judoka. Fiora represented Argentina at the 2024 Summer Olympics, securing a spot by winning the 2024 African Open in Abidjan. In the women's 50 kg judo event, Fiora was eliminated after losing to Ndiaye Binta.

Fiora has lived in Italy since 2002, moving there with her family in the midst of the Argentine great depression.
