= Monte Grande Rugby Club =

(Argentina) Monte Grande
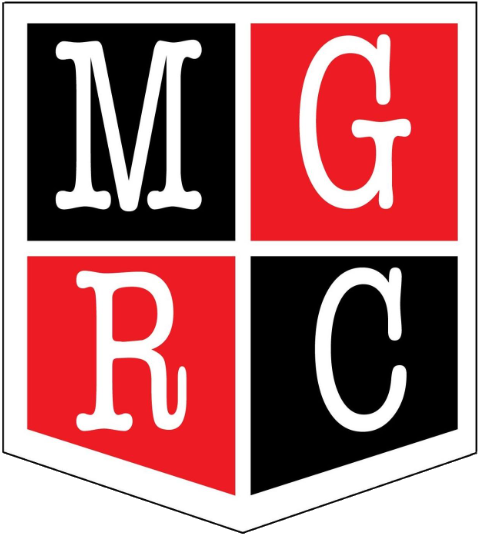
- Full name: Monte Grande Rugby Club
- Union: URBA
- Founded: 28 April 1965; 60 years ago
- Location: Monte Grande, Greater Buenos Aires, Argentina
- Ground: Monte Grande
- President: José Danelotti
- League: Primera C
- 2025: 2nd. (promoted)
Team kit

Official website
- montegranderc.org.ar

Monte Grande Rugby Club, usually just Monte Grande, is an Argentine amateur sports club located in the Monte Grande district of Greater Buenos Aires. The rugby union squad currently plays in Primera B, the third division of the URBA league system.

The club has also a field hockey section, affiliated to the Buenos Aires Hockey Association.

== History ==
In 1965 a group of young rugby players thought of establishing a place where to play the sport they loved. Finally they founded the club on April 28, 1965, naming Oscar Bottone as president. The first meetings of the club were celebrated at diverse high schools of Monte Grande. That meetings later defined the name, colors and the pet of the club Monte Grande.

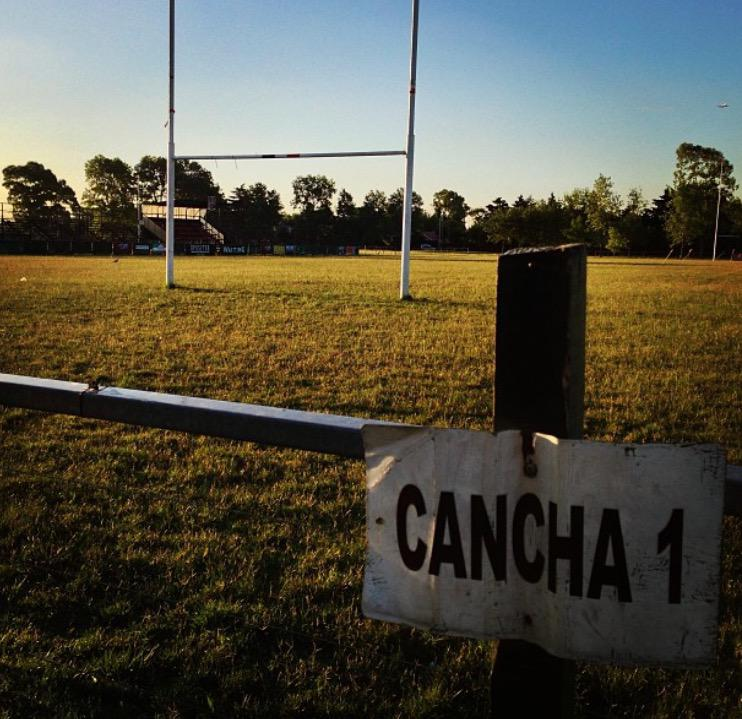
Monte Grande rugby field

In August, 1965, the club asked Argentine Rugby Union to be registered, being supported in that requirement by Lomas Athletic and Olivos. In 1966 the team disputed a number of friendly matches (demanded by the rules of the UAR) and on March 24 the club is officially affiliated to that institution and the team began to dispute the third division championship. The first official lineup was: Corchio, Hosteter, Drew, Lasalle y Galan; Méndez y Gómez Durañona; Cavatorta, Guida y Canegallo; Torres Y Ruiz; Bottone, Cordeiro y Hernández. That team faced Club Central de Buenos Aires, winning 19-11. By those years a women's field hockey team was formed as well. They played in the same field that rugby union team.

In 1974 the matches had to be played at Club Vialidad Nacional of Ezeiza, Buenos Aires, which field was rented by Monte Grande. The next year all divisions of the club were disbanded therefore Monte Grande could not dispute the 1975 and 1976 seasons.

After some failed attempts to merge with other clubs, in 1982 Monte Grande won the promotion to "Tercera de Ascenso" (third division) and the club acquired a 30 hectares land to build its sports installations, which were finally opened in 1987. In 1993 the rugby union team promoted to second division, where has remained since.

In October 2025, Monte Grande promoted to Primera B, the third division of URBA. The team secured their place after easily defeating El Retiro 116–12 so they promoted along with champions Vicentinos.
