= Club Atlético Ferrocarril General San Martín =

Argentinian sports club (mainly rugby union), based in Buenos Aires

(Argentina) San Martín
- Full name: Club Atlético Ferrocarril General San Martín
- Union: URBA
- Nickname(s): Pacific, Tricolor, Ferroviarios
- Founded: 6 April 1908; 118 years ago
- Location: Villa Raffo, Argentina
- Ground(s): Lope de Vega and Colón, Villa Raffo
- President: Gustavo Arona
- Coach(es): Mariano Bosch; Matias Kahn
- League: URBA Primera B
- 2025: 5th.
Team kit

Official website
- clubsanmartin.org

Club San Martín (formerly Pacific Rugby Athletic Club) is an Argentine amateur sports club based in the Villa Raffo neighborhood of Tres de Febrero Partido. San Martín is mostly known for its rugby union team, which currently plays in Primera B, the third division of the Unión de Rugby de Buenos Aires (URBA). The club also a field hockey squad which participates at tournaments organised by the Buenos Aires Hockey Association (AHBA).

Other sports practised at San Martín are bowls and tennis.

== History ==
=== The beginning ===
The huge expansion of the Buenos Aires and Pacific Railway in Argentina encouraged workers to form a club, after some years playing cricket in different locations, most of them borrowed by other institutions. On 3 April 1908, a first meeting was held at the railway offices, naming Lightly Simpson as first president of the "Pacific Railway Athletic Club", the name chosen. On 6 April, the founding members asked BAP Railway Manager for approval, stating that only railway workers could be members of the recently formed club. The Managers gave their consent the requirement, allowing members to use a land near to Santos Lugares station, in Tres de Febrero Partido.

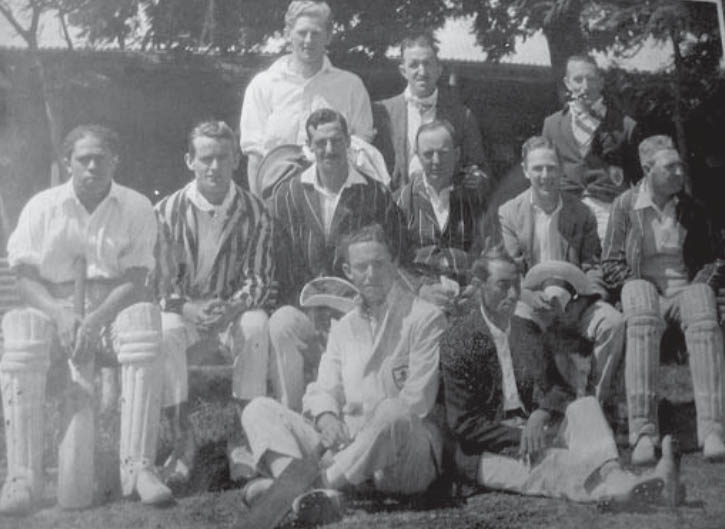
1909 Pacific cricket team

Once the club was founded, Pacific club started its activities playing football matches, first of them facing "Asociación Cristiana de Jóvenes", which ended 2–2. The team continuing (convocando) some opponents to play with, receiving the positive feedback from Belgrano Athletic, which played a friendly match against Pacific.

Pacific was also one of the founding members of the Argentine Field Hockey Association, along with Belgrano Athletic. Soon after, the first tournament was organized, being won by Club Atlético San Isidro. The same year of its foundation, the club started its participation in the cricket championship for the 1908–09 season, being registered in the second division. Pacific finished 3rd. at the end of the season.

The first title for the club came in 1909, obtaining the Railway Football League, a tournament played amongst railroad related teams. The most frequent lineup was: Wilson, Mallet, Machado; Parkinson, E. A. Brown, Sheridan; Curtis, Watson, Morgan (captain), Parsons, Chalk. The success of the football team encouraged club's manager to affiliate to Argentine Football Association, which accepted the request and registered Pacific to play at third division.

Rugby union started to be practised at the club in 1910. Buenos Aires Football Club (predecessor of Buenos Aires Cricket & Rugby Club) played all its home games in PRAC field. Hockey continued developing in Argentina, increasing the number of teams taking part of the league. By 1911 this was the most popular sport of the club.

=== Consolidation through rugby ===
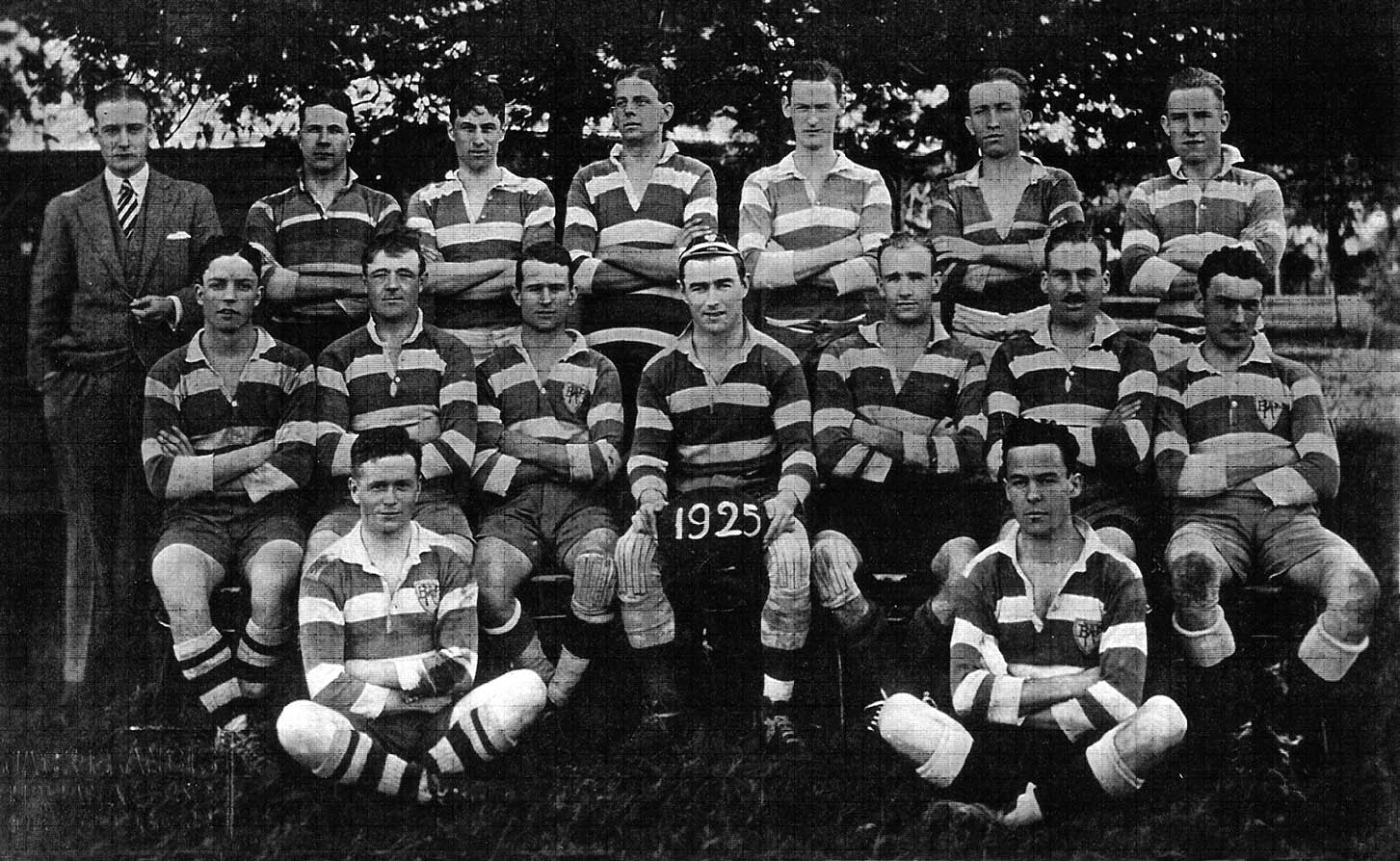
The rugby union team in 1925

Rugby union was incorporated to Pacific in 1922, which affiliated to River Plate Rugby Union one year later to play at the second division. The club played its first match against Club Universitario de Buenos Aires (CUBA), being the first of some friendly matches prior the beginning of the official tournament. In 1925 Pacific debuted at Primera División facing Buenos Aires Football Club. The team made a good performance in the tournament, finishing 4th.

By 1921 football had been abandoned by Pacific and it would not be reintroduced anymore. On the other hand, the practise of tennis gained followers amongst club's members. At the beginning of 1930, the sports practised at the club were field hockey, cricket, tennis and rugby. Pacific won its first hockey championship in 1929, obtaining a new title one year later. In 1931 the team achieved a notable victory over Club Atlético San Isidro, defeating it 8–0. The women's team also won titles for the club, obtaining the 1932, 1935 and 1936 championship, being nicknamed "Las Imbatibles" ("The Unbeaten"). In rugby, Pacific played against British & Irish Lions, who were touring on Argentina for the first time, in 1936. The Lions won 62–0.

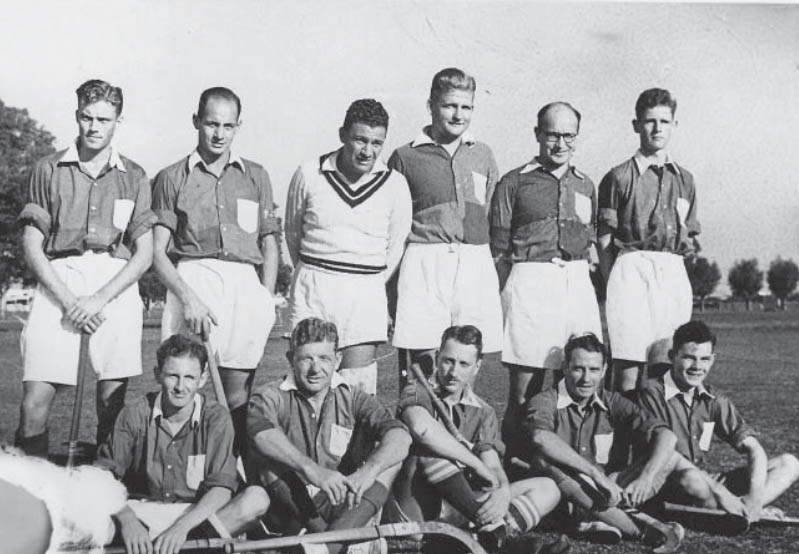
1943 Men's field hockey team, using the square uniform

At the end of the 1930s, Pacific had more than 600 members, forcing the club to put a limit, restricting new memberships to avoid exceeding its capacity.

In 1943, Pacific rugby team promoted to Primera División, after beating Sportivo Francés (now Asociación Deportiva Francesa) in the final match. The club lasted only one season in Primera, being relegated again in 1944.

=== Club San Martín rises ===
On 13 February 1947, the railway lines were bought by the Government of Argentina to the British companies. As a result of the nationalisation, Pacific changed its name to "Club Ferrocarril San Martín" (the name given by the Government to former Buenos Aires and Pacific Railway, now a state-owned line).

In 1949 "San Martín" returned to the first division of rugby. During the 1950 there was a revival of cricket, sport which was usually practised during Summer, when the rugby seasons finished. After spending some seasons at second division, in 1962 San Martín rugby team won a new championship promoting to primera, after an 8–8 draw with Alumni in the last fixture. San Martín played a total of 20 matches, with 20 wins, 6 draws and only 2 lost. The team scored 260 points receiving only 71. San Martín made a great campaign in its return to primera, finishing in 2nd. position.

During the 1960s the practise of cricket had considerably decreased, therefore San Martín disaffiliated from the association and was inactive until 1971. The rugby team was relegated from primera to the third division due to a major restructuring, in 1977, although San Martín returned to second division two years later. The club disputed a playoff to return to primera in 1983, but lost the decisive match at the hands of Champagnat.

=== Back to Primera ===
In 1996 San Martín played a qualifying round in order to promote one team to Primera División. The team defeated Liceo Naval 44–14 in the final, returning to the top level. During those years San Martín also bought the lands that the club had occupied since 1908 when the institution was founded.

== Colors ==
The colors of the club are directly related to the Buenos Aires and Pacific Railway, because they were the official colors of the railway, used in steam locomotives and cars. Green represented the Argentine Pampas; blue symbolized the Pacific Ocean (which railway connected to the Atlantic crossing Buenos Aires and the Provinces of Cuyo Region. Finally, white represented the snowed mountains of the Andes.

=== Sports uniforms ===
Footb / FH 1908–11	Football 1912–17	Hockey 1911-today	Rugby 1913–1923	Rugby 1923–today

== Honours ==
=== Field hockey ===
==== Men's ====
- Metropolitano Primera División (2): 1929, 1930
- Metropolitano Segunda División (2): 1960, 1961, 1962, 1963, 1964
- Copa Competencia (1): 1947

==== Women's ====
- Metropolitano Primera División (5): 1933, 1935, 1936, 1941, 1947

=== Rugby union ===
- Segunda División (2): 1943, 1962
