= Hurling Club =

Argentine sports club

(Argentina) Hurling
- Full name: Hurling Club
- Union: URBA
- Founded: 22 August 1922; 104 years ago
- Location: Hurlingham, Argentina
- Ground: Hurlingham
- Chairman: Rolando Quinn
- League: Primera A
- 2026: 8th.
Team kit

Official website
- hurlingclub.com.ar

Hurling Club is an Argentine sports club, located in Hurlingham, Buenos Aires. As its name implies, the club was established in 1922 as a hurling team. Other disciplines hosted by Hurling are field hockey, Gaelic football, and rugby union.

The rugby team currently plays in Primera A, the second division of the URBA league system, while the hockey team competes at tournaments organised by the Buenos Aires Hockey Association.

Hurling is also notable for being the first Argentine club where Gaelic football was practised, with regular invitational matches held against Irish teams and other Gaelic football teams from Buenos Aires. The national side won the World Cup held in Abu Dhabi in 2015, with a team formed exclusively by rugby union footballers.

== History ==
Irish Argentine immigrants had been the first to introduce the practice of hurling in the country in 1887. They later formed the first team which was named "Buenos Aires Hurling Club", in August 1900. The First World War meant the importation of hurleys was interrupted, as a result, the practise of hurling ceased until the war came to an end. In 1920, several clubs such as Buenos Aires, Mercedes, Wanderers and Bearna Baoghail, met to find a field where to play hurling. As none of the clubs had an own field, the first games were played at Club Singer.

In August 1922, the Banco de la Nación Argentina rented a land in the Floresta district to BA Hurling Club. On August 22, the "Federación Argentina de Hurling" (Argentine Hurling Federation) was officially established.

Nevertheless, in 1924 the Municipality of Buenos Aires sent an eviction order to the club, alleging that new streets would be opened there. Hurling moved to Villa Devoto, where the club rented a land on Santo Tomé streets. During its years in Villa Devoto, the club formed the first women's field hockey team (which began to compete under the "Golden Wings" name in 1931) and hosted the practise of athletics, bowls and tennis.

As the practise of hurling decreased (due to problems to import the hurleys), some of Hurling's members began to introduce other sports to the club, such as men's field hockey and rugby union, which first practises were in 1941 but the first match was played one year later. The jersey chosen was green, white and orange in horizontal strips, that would be worn until 1956. The first URBA team that played Hurling was Lomas Athletic in May 1942. The game was played in Villa Devoto, with Lomas winning by 19–5. The line-up was: K. Patricio Keegan, Guillermo MacAllister, A. Harten, Santiago Ussher (captain), Lorenzo Shanly, Desmond Fitzpatrick, Tomás Mac Cormack, Edmundo Shanly, J. Kelly, Eduardo Ferro, Guillermo MacDermott, José Carmody, Cornelius Ronayne, Roberto Schamun, Sean Sills.

In 1943 Hurling affiliated to the URRP and began to compete at the third division. The first official game was on May 9, 1943, v. Kanguru Rugby Club. Hurling lost 17–3.

In 1945 Hurling acquired a land in Hurlingham, Buenos Aires where the club created its new facilities, completing them three years later. In 1955 the club buildings were completely burned down. The club was later rebuilt, also adding a golf course in 1963.

The field hockey section has become the most successful of the club, having won 13 championships to date (10 titles by men's team and 3 by women's).

== Titles ==
=== Field hockey ===
==== Men's ====
- Metropolitano Primera División (9): 1949, 1950, 1951, 1953, 1954, 1955, 1956, 1969, 1978, 1983

==== Women's ====
- Metropolitano Primera División (3): 1959, 1972, 1978

=== Rugby union ===
- URBA Primera B (1): 2023
