= Tigre Rugby Club =

Argentine rugby union club in Tigre

(Argentina) Tigre
- Full name: Tigre Rugby Club
- Union: URBA
- Founded: 15 May 1981; 44 years ago
- Ground(s): Benito Lynch 1600; Tigre, Argentina
- Chairman: Sergio Pérez
- League: URBA Segunda
- 2025: 3rd.
1st kit	2nd kit

Official website
- tigrerugbyclub.com.ar

Tigre Rugby Club is an Argentine rugby union and field hockey club sited in Tigre, Greater Buenos Aires. The rugby union team currently plays in Segunda División, the fifth division of the URBA league system.

== History ==
Tigre RC was the first rugby union club in Tigre so the existing clubs were dedicated to other sports such as football (where Club Atlético Tigre has been the most representative club of the city due to the football popularity in Argentina) or rowing, which is a very practised activity because of the nearness of the Río Tigre that crosses the city dividing it in two.

After many attempts of creating a club where to practise rugby, on May 15, 1981 the "Tigre Rugby Club" was constituted. Once the club was formed, its managers began to search for a field, which was finally gave by the Government of the city.

== Team image ==
Tigre Club adopted the same colors (blue and red) than Club Atlético Tigre, although both clubs are not related. Those colors were elected in 1983, soon after the club was founded and have been worn in the kit uniforms and club's emblem to date.
