= Club San Fernando =

Argentine sports club

San Fernando
- Full name: Club San Fernando
- Nicknames: Sanfer; Tricolor
- Sport: List: Artistic gymnastics; Basketball; Basque pelota; Canoe racing; Field hockey; Football; Judo; Rowing; Rugby union; Tennis; Volleyball
- Founded: 3 March 1923; 103 years ago
- Based in: San Fernando, Argentina
- Colors: (Green, Blue, White)
- Chairman: Mario Bonini
- Affiliations: URBA (rugby); AHBA (field hockey)
- Championships: List: Metropolitano hockey (m) (17); Metropolitano hockey (w) (5); Segunda División (1)
- Website: clubsanfernando.org.ar

Club San Fernando is an Argentine multi-sports club based in San Fernando, Buenos Aires. One of the largest clubs of the North side of Greater Buenos Aires, the club hosts a wide range of sports and activities, such as artistic gymnastics, basketball, basque pelota, canoe racing, field hockey, football, judo, rowing, rugby union, tennis, and volleyball.

The club has a large tradition in sports so in football, San Fernando played in Argentine Primera División from 1922 to 1931 when the squad was relegated to Second Division. San Fernando disaffiliated from the Argentine Football Association when the sport became professional in the country, although the practise of football was never abandoned.

Field hockey is San Fernando's most successful sport. The men's and women's teams are affiliated to Buenos Aires Hockey Association, having won 17 and 5 Torneo Metropolitano championships, respectively. The rugby teams are affiliated to Unión de Rugby de Buenos Aires and currently play in Primera División B, the third division of the URBA league system.

== History ==
=== Origins in football ===
The roots of current club can be traced to its predecessor Club Atlético San Fernando, founded on 25 November 1905 by a group of members of Club Tiro Federal Argentino who played football outside that institution. The meeting was held in a room of Club Social Unión because Tiro Federal refused to host the meeting.

The club soon affiliated to the Argentine Association, playing some friendly matches against Uruguayan teams Nacional, Palmira and Club Náutico Carmelo.

In 1918 San Fernando promoted to División Intermedia (second division) after winning over Del Plata by 2–1 at Independiente stadium. When the club lost its game field due to the owner requested it to get back, Gerardo Magaldi ceded a land that the Municipality of San Fernando had given him many years before as a payment for a debt. Therefore, Atlético San Fernando established its headquarters there.

At the end of the 1910s, the Municipality annulled the property given to Magaldi and requested the land to get back. Not only the club refused but some the neighbors declared against the request so the municipality desisted from demanding the restitution of the land.

Two years later, Atlético promoted to Primera División. To play at the top division, the Association demanded the clubs to have their stadiums in optimal conditions due to security reasons, otherwise they would not be allowed to play. Therefore, the club had to build grandstands and a fence surrounding the field, for which it was suggested that San Fernando merge with clubs Social Unión and Fénix Club de Gimnasia y Esgrima. Fénix did not accept to merge but so did Social Unión.

Atlético San Fernando debuted in the 1922 Primera División season playing in official league, "Asociación Argentina de Football" (the other league was the dissident "Asociación Amateurs de Football"). The colors that identify the club (blue, white and green) symbolized seriousness, purity and hope respectively.

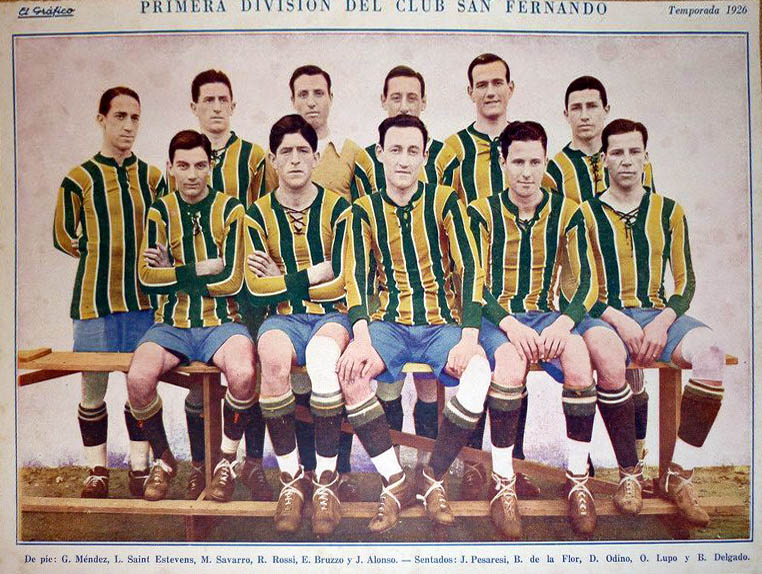
The San Fernando football team of 1926

On 3 March 1923, seventy-two members of clubs Social Unión and Atlético San Fernando gave their approval to the merger, so current "Club San Fernando" was established.

San Fernando continued playing at the top division of football until 1931 when the team was relegated after finishing in the last place. That same year, the club decided to disaffiliate from the Football Association, focusing on internal tournaments since then.

Tennis was the second sport to be introduced at San Fernando, in 1930. It was practised only at lower levels until 1932, when the club affiliated to Asociación Argentina de Lawn Tenis. One year later, the club took part in its first official tournament, finishing second. In 1937, the men's team promoted to Segunda División.

Basketball began to be practised at the club in 1925 when the first court was built. In 1930, the club had 1,600 members.

=== Hockey ===
In March 1932 a female team named "San Fernando Hockey Club" requested the club permission to play their games in its fields. Then president Francisco Charlin approved the request and not only the girls were admitted but field hockey was added to the institution as an official activity. The female team was affiliated to Argentine league to play at second division. The first team that took part in an official championship was formed by Lorna Mathews, Norah Hubber, Marjory Stuert, Peggy Cowlishaw, Joey walsh, Florrie Walding, Dorothy Stuart, Beatrice Crawlwey, Violet Spamer, Gladis Herboldt and Martha Harrison and Doris Mayne.

In 1942 a men's hockey team was also created. The first players of that team were Betti, Borgonovo, Boscaro, Trevisan, Francheschini, Manfredi, Otero, Pigni, Rivero, Sutil, Odewal and Cersósimo. That team promoted to Primera División in 1946. In 1958 San Fernando won the Torneo Metropolitano championship, being the first of 13 titles won to date.

In 1961 San Fernando inaugurated its gym, which would be used to play the basketball games apart from other purposes. Three years later the club opens a basketball academy. In 1976 the San Fernando basketball team promoted to Primera División finishing 2nd after Estudiantes de La Plata that won the title. The roster was: Aníbal Jaimes (captain), Daniel Solzona, Ricardo Guitiérrez, Héctor Corgo, Daniel Magaldi, José Guazzaroni, Hugo Barbiero, Carlos Leveroni, Carlos Frissena, Sergio Sartor, Carlos Guazzaroni, C. Momiroff, Alejandro Montes, Miguel Bercoff, Carlos Claramut, Juan Arbillaga and Aníbal Aagard. Eduardo Risso and Ricardo Vellón were the coaches.

Despite the success during the 1970s, San Fernando would be relegated to lower divisions in subsequent years.

=== Rugby ===
After rugby union was introduced at the club San Fernando played at the highest level of the Unión de Rugby de Buenos Aires championship until 2009, when after disputing the Top14 of Torneo de la URBA the club punished five players of the first division, banning them for periods from three months to two years. Due to that suspension the club could not play the seven tournament.

The banned players left San Fernando to establish a new club, so Delta Rugby Club was founded and started to play at Grupo IV, the lowest division of the Unión de Rugby de Buenos Aires.

With a team dismantled because of the exodus of its most notable players one year before, San Fernando made a poor campaign in the 2010 championship and was relegated to Grupo II (the second division) where it currently plays.

=== Club schism ===
After several disagreements with the authorities, in 2009 a group of near 100 members and executives of San Fernando left the club to form a new entity, "Delta Rugby Club". The departure of some of San Fernando's best rugby players caused the team to weaken in such a way that they were relegated to Grupo II (second division) in 2010. As of 2024, Delta had 650 members.

== Team image ==
Club's colors are green, blue, and white, being nicknamed tricolor.

== Honours ==
=== Field hockey ===
Men's

- Metropolitano de Primera División (17): 1958, 1960, 1962, 1964, 1966, 1967, 1970, 1971, 1975, 1978, 1982, 2003, 2006, 2017, 2021, 2024, 2025

Women's

- Metropolitano de Primera División (5): 1982, 2002, 2021, 2023, 2025

=== Football ===
- Segunda División (1): 1918
