= Buenos Aires Cricket & Rugby Club =

Sports club

(Argentina) Buenos Aires
- Full name: Buenos Aires Cricket & Rugby Club
- Union: URBA
- Nickname: Biei
- Founded: 1831; 195 years ago (Note: BACRC's itself sets the date of its foundation in 1831. The Buenos Aires Rugby Union mentions "before 8 December 1864", which refers to the inauguration of the BACC's ground. The claim that the club was founded in 1831 is supported by existing documentary evidence about a cricket match played by Buenos Aires that same year.)
- Location: Victoria, Argentina
- Ground: Victoria
- President: Damian Habib
- Coach: Martín Etchepare
- League: Top 14
- 2026: 12th.
Team kit

Official website
- bacrc.com

Buenos Aires Cricket & Rugby Club, sometimes known simply as Buenos Aires, is an Argentine amateur sports club headquartered in the Victoria district of San Fernando Partido in Buenos Aires Province. Having set its official date of foundation in 1831, the club claims to be the oldest club still in existence in Argentina, according to reports of a cricket match played by the club in Recoleta, Buenos Aires that year.

A highlight of club's history was in 1951 when the Buenos Aires FC (established in 1886 as a rugby union club and founder member of the "River Plate Rugby Championship" (now the Argentine Rugby Union) merged to BACC, renaming "Buenos Aires Cricket & Rugby Club". Since then, rugby union has been the main sport of the institution.

Rugby's senior squad participates in Top 12, the highest division of the URBA league system. The club also has a women's field hockey team that plays in the Torneo Metropolitano B (Second Division), organised by the Buenos Aires Hockey Association (AHBA), while the cricket squad competes in the Argentine Cricket Association tournaments.

Football is also practised at the club but at children level only.

== History ==
=== Cricket origins ===
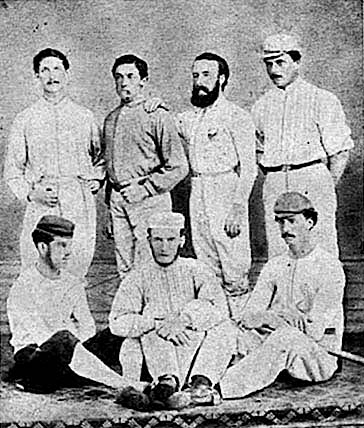
Buenos Aires C.C. team of 1867

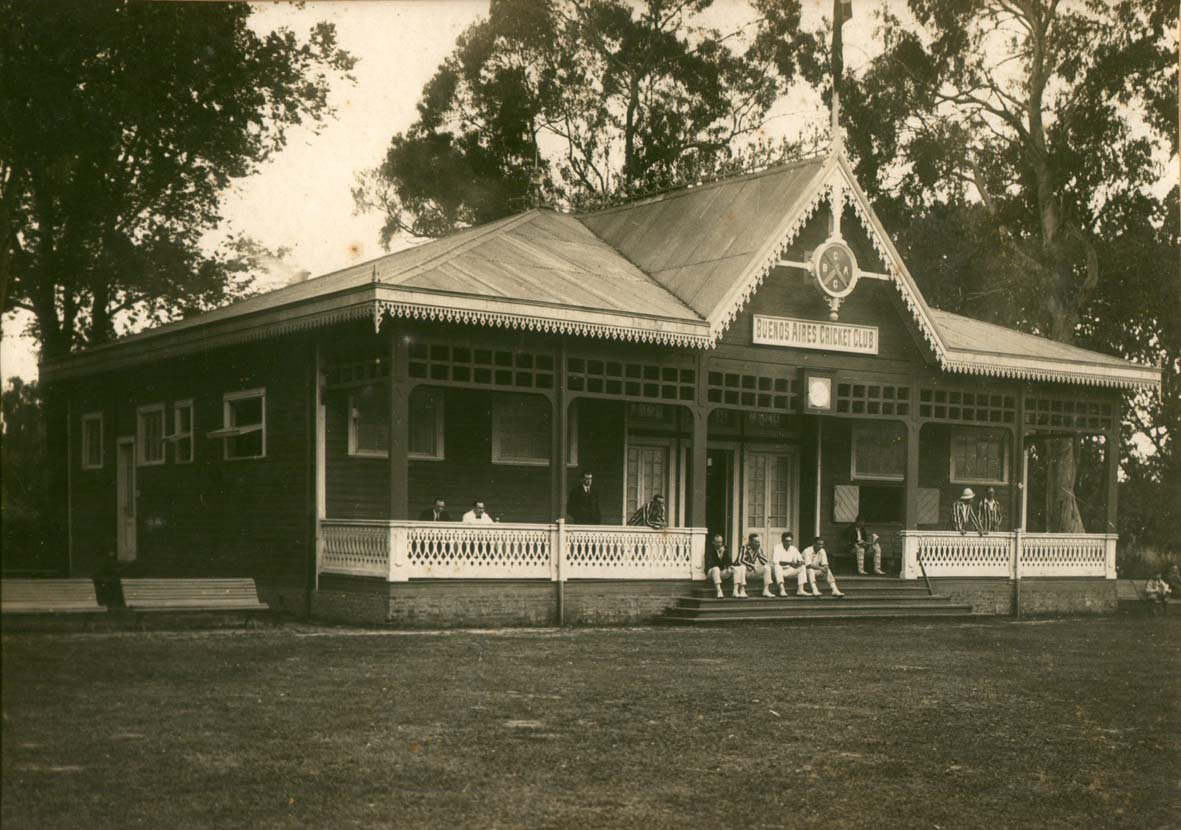
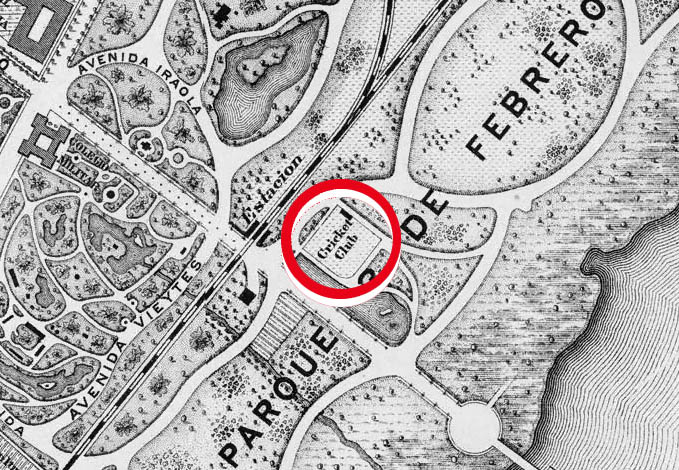
The BACC clubhouse in 1868 (left); location of the BACC in Palermo from a 1895 map (right); the first association football and rugby union matches in Argentina were played there

The exact date of establishment of the "Buenos Aires Cricket Club" is not clear because of the fire that destroyed most of the club's facilities and its archives. Nevertheless, there are records of a cricket match played by members of the club in the Recoleta district of Buenos Aires in 1831, where a flag with the legend "Buenos Aires Cricket Club" was displayed. That match was covered by English language newspaper The British Packet, published in Buenos Aires.

The first president of the club was British consul Frank Parish, named in 1858. The club had its first ground near the Río de la Plata, on a land that would be later occupied by Colegio Nacional Mariano Moreno. In late 1861 the club moved to Palermo neighborhood, where the team played until 1864. The club got new members among British immigrants to Buenos Aires, adding new sections such as football, rowing, and athletics. Nevertheless, the number of members did not increase significantly.

En 1864, the BACC rented a land in Palermo, near the Buenos Aires Northern Railway station, next to Galileo Galilei Planetarium. The Buenos Aires Cricket Club Ground was inaugurated on December 8, 1864, in a match v the HMS Bombay crew. That date would be established as the club's official birthdate.

In April, 1868, BACC played its first club match facing Montevideo Cricket Club (MVCC) in the city of Montevideo. BACC won by 156–124. The rematch was played in Buenos Aires in 1869, where BACC defeated Montevideo again by 174–121.

On 8 December 1864, the club officially inaugurated its game field in Parque Tres de Febrero of Palermo, Buenos Aires, where the Galileo Galilei planetarium is placed nowadays. That day BACC defeated HMS Bombay team by 85 runs to 31, just 6 days before that ship would be destroyed in a fire on the River Plate, in a freak target practice accident.

In 1877 the BACC played its first match against Rosario Cricket Club.

=== Football and rugby pioneers ===
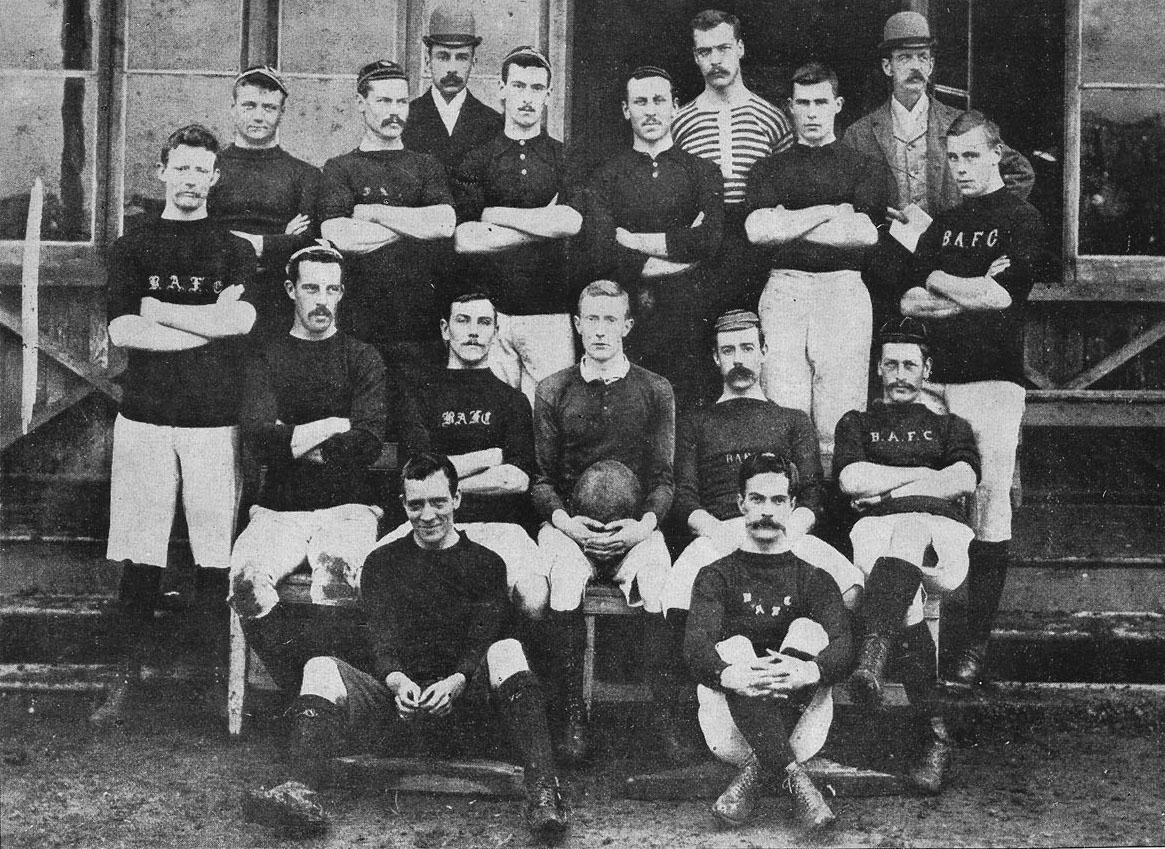
Team of Buenos Aires F.C. of 1891. The club would then merge with BACC in 1951

On 26 June 1867, several members of the club met on the Buenos Aires Cricket Club's field in Palermo, Buenos Aires to play what would be the first game of football ever played in Argentina. The game had originally planned to be played in La Boca but it had to be moved due to floods.

The game was such a success that some members would go on to found the Buenos Aires Football Club, which would be the first football club in South America. For years to come both clubs would share facilities and members with the BACC playing cricket in the summer and BAFC playing football in the winter.

Rugby union rules were first adopted by Buenos Aires FC in 1874 but the club was dissolved one year later.

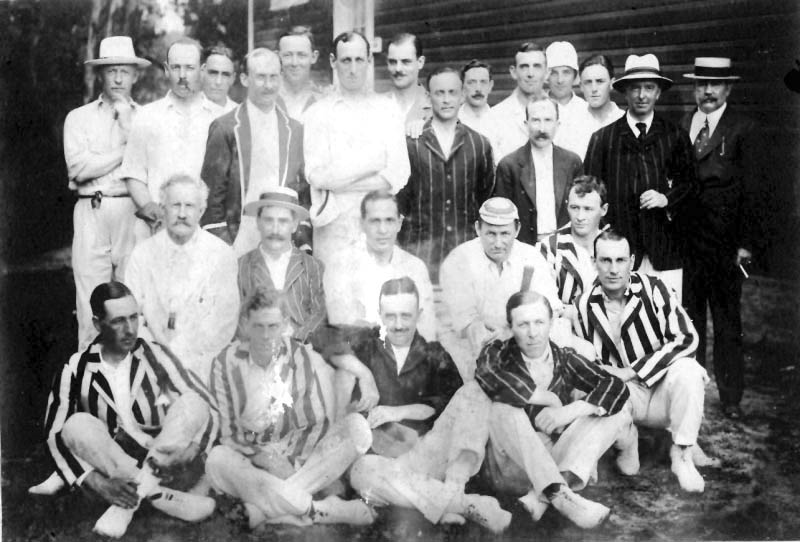
Buenos Aires and Rosario A.C. players posing together during a cricket match, 1916

In 1886, a new a new "Buenos Aires Football Club" was founded as a rugby union club exclusively. The club played against Rosario A.C., being the first time two different clubs ever met for an interprovincial rugby game in the country.

In 1899, along with Rosario A.C., Belgrano A.C. and Lomas A.C., Buenos Aires FC became a founding member of "The River Plate Rugby Championship", which would later become today's Argentine Rugby Union.

The first Unión de Rugby de Buenos Aires championship was created the same year. Buenos Aires won eight of the first 17 editions of this tournament. During the 1920s, 1930s and 1940s, the club did not win any title, encountering strong resistance from younger clubs, such as C.A. San Isidro and San Isidro Club, which have won most of the URBA titles to date.

=== A new foundation ===
In 1948, the facilities of the BACC were destroyed by the fire (some sources affirm it was intentional although those versions could never be confirmed). The fire destroyed most of the archives and documents of the club. Three years later, on 4 May 1951, both the BACC and BAFC decided to merge, under the name "Buenos Aires Cricket & Rugby Club". The merger was legally structured with the Buenos Aires Cricket Club as the absorbing entity, since it had legal status.

The recently created club did not have definitive location until October 1952, when it moved to the Don Torcuato district, where Buenos Aires CRC established its headquarters. The club stayed there until 1987, when the lands were sold to Hindú Club. That same year, Buenos Aires moved to Victoria, where it has remained up to the present day.

In 1997, BACRC inaugurated the first purpose-built rugby union stadium in Argentina, erected in Los Polvorines, Greater Buenos Aires. The stadium, with capacity for 15,000 spectators, was venue of eight consecutive Torneo de la URBA finals, from 1998 to 2005. Besides, the Argentina national team played nine international matches at BACRC Stadium. In 2005, the land where the stadium had been built was sold to a Germany-based company.

=== Field hockey ===
The "Surí Hockey Club" was established as a women's field hockey club by a group of former students of the Northlands and St. Hilda's schools. In 1945, Surí ("rhea" in the Quechua languages) began to play in tournaments organized by field hockey association, starting in the third division. After many years playing its home games at different venues, due to Surí not having a stadium, the team finally joined BACRC in 1966, changing its name to Buenos Aires.

Buenos Aires and its predecessor Surí have been successful teams in Argentine hockey, winning a total of seven Metropolitano championships between 1962 and 1988, two by Surí and five by BACRC.

In 2007, the club inaugurated its synthetic grass hockey field in San Fernando. The women's field hockey team has played its home games there since then.

== Honours ==
=== Cricket ===
- Primera División (18): 1904–05, 1919–20, 1924–25, 1927–28, 1930–31, 1938–39, 1939–40, 1940–41, 1941–42,
  1949–50, 1952–53, 1956–57, 1957–58, 1963–64, 1966–67, 1971–72, 1975/76, 1976–77

=== Rugby union ===
- Torneo de la URBA (10): 1900, 1901, 1902, 1903, 1904, 1908, 1909, 1915, (Note: 1900–1915: titles won by the Buenos Aires Football Club (then merged with Buenos Aires Cricket Club).) 1958, 1959

== See also ==
- Buenos Aires Cricket Club Ground
- Buenos Aires F.C.
