= Club Ciudad de Buenos Aires =

Argentine sports and social club

Ciudad de Buenos Aires
- Full name: Club Ciudad de Buenos Aires
- Nicknames: Muni
- Sport: List: artistic gymnastics; artistic roller skating; basketball; basque pelota; cestoball; field hockey; football; golf; judo; karate; roller hockey; rugby union; rhythmic gymnastics; swimming; synchronised swimming; taekwondo; tennis; volleyball
- Founded: 6 October 1920; 105 years ago
- League: Metropolitano de Hockey; URBA Primera C
- Based in: Buenos Aires
- Location: Avenida del Libertador 7501
- Colors
- Chairman: Marcelo Tortorelli
- Affiliations: AHBA (hockey); URBA (rugby)
- Championships: Metropolitano de Hockey: men's (14); women's (5)
- Website: clubciudad.org.ar

Club Ciudad de Buenos Aires, familiarly nicknamed as "Muni", is an Argentine sports and social club located in the Núñez neighbourhood of the city of Buenos Aires. The institution was founded on October 6, 1920.

The nickname "Muni" is a diminutive of the word "Municipalidad", which was the way the Government of Buenos Aires seat was called until the 1994 reform of the Argentine Constitution. Since then, the Executive is called "Jefe de Gobierno" ("Chief of Government") instead of "Intendente" ("Mayor") and the former "Municipalidad" denomination became obsolete.

== History ==
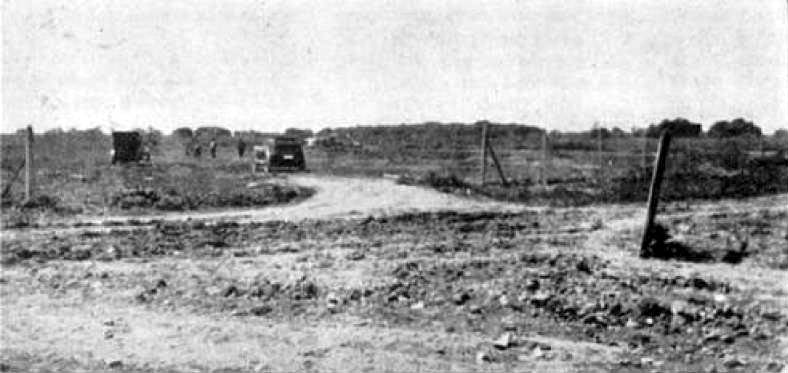
Lands granted by the Municipality in possession of the club

On 6 October 1920 employees of the street light section of the Municipality of Buenos Aires met to establish a club which was initially named "Club Atlético Dirección de Alumbrado". After that, they began the search for a field to practice sports.

One year later, the Government of Buenos Aires gave the club a 100 m2 land on Blandengues (current Del Libertador Avenue) and Crisólogo Larralde, where the club established its headquarters.

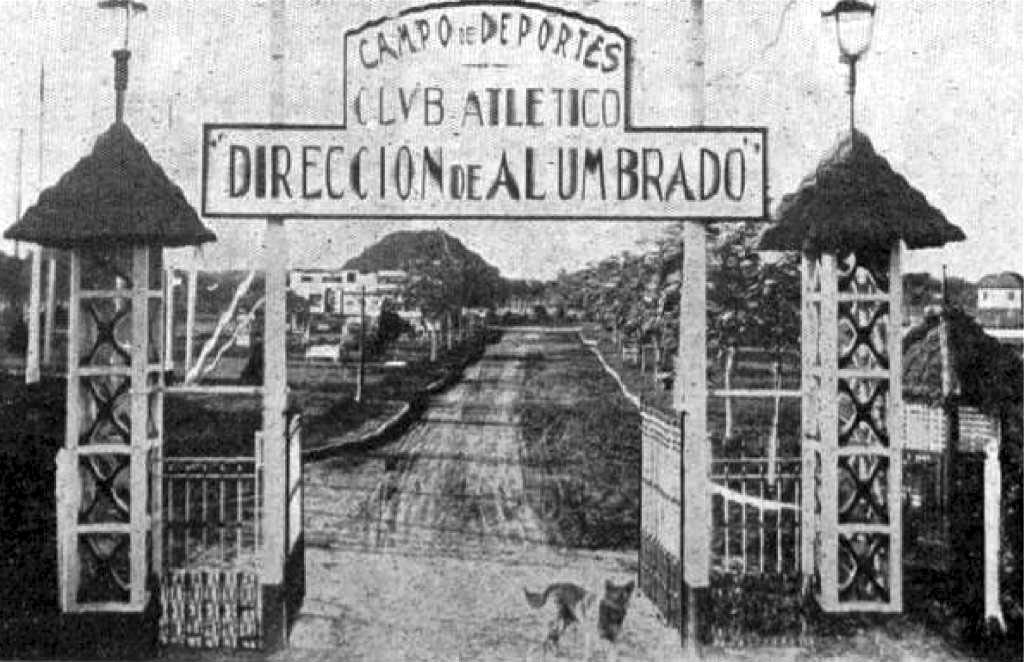
Club Alumbrado's main entrance

In April 1930, a group of employees of the City of Buenos Aires met at City Hall to express their wish for the creation of a sports club that included all municipal workers. They resolved to establish the club, which was named "Club Municipalidad de la Ciudad de Buenos Aires". In 1932, by decree of the City Council, the club was granted the use of a portion of municipal land located on Blandengues Street, bordering the Alumbrado, Atlético Policial, and Unión Obreros Municipales clubs.

In 1937, the City Council passed a decree recognizing the Club Municipalidad de la Ciudad de Buenos Aires, along with the Club Atlético Dirección de Alumbrado, as the official club of the Municipality. Therefore, on May 20, 1940, after numerous discussions between the directors of the Alumbrado and Municipalidad clubs, they merged into a new institution called "Club Municipalidad de la Ciudad de Buenos Aires"; the two institutions were thus united under a single name.

In 1978, a Municipal Ordinance prohibited the use of names that distinguish the Municipality of the City of Buenos Aires. Consequently, the Board of Directors submitted a proposal to change the club's name at an Extraordinary General Meeting, and it was unanimously approved that the name be "Club Ciudad de Buenos Aires".

== Sports and activities ==
Club Ciudad hosts a large number of sports and activities, such as artistic gymnastics, artistic roller skating, basketball, basque pelota, cestoball, field hockey, football, golf, judo, karate, roller hockey, rugby union, rhythmic gymnastics, swimming, synchronised swimming, taekwondo, tennis, volleyball, among others.

Other recreational activities include latin and pop dance, pilates and yoga among others. Cultural activities include language teaching, and singing.

=== Hockey ===
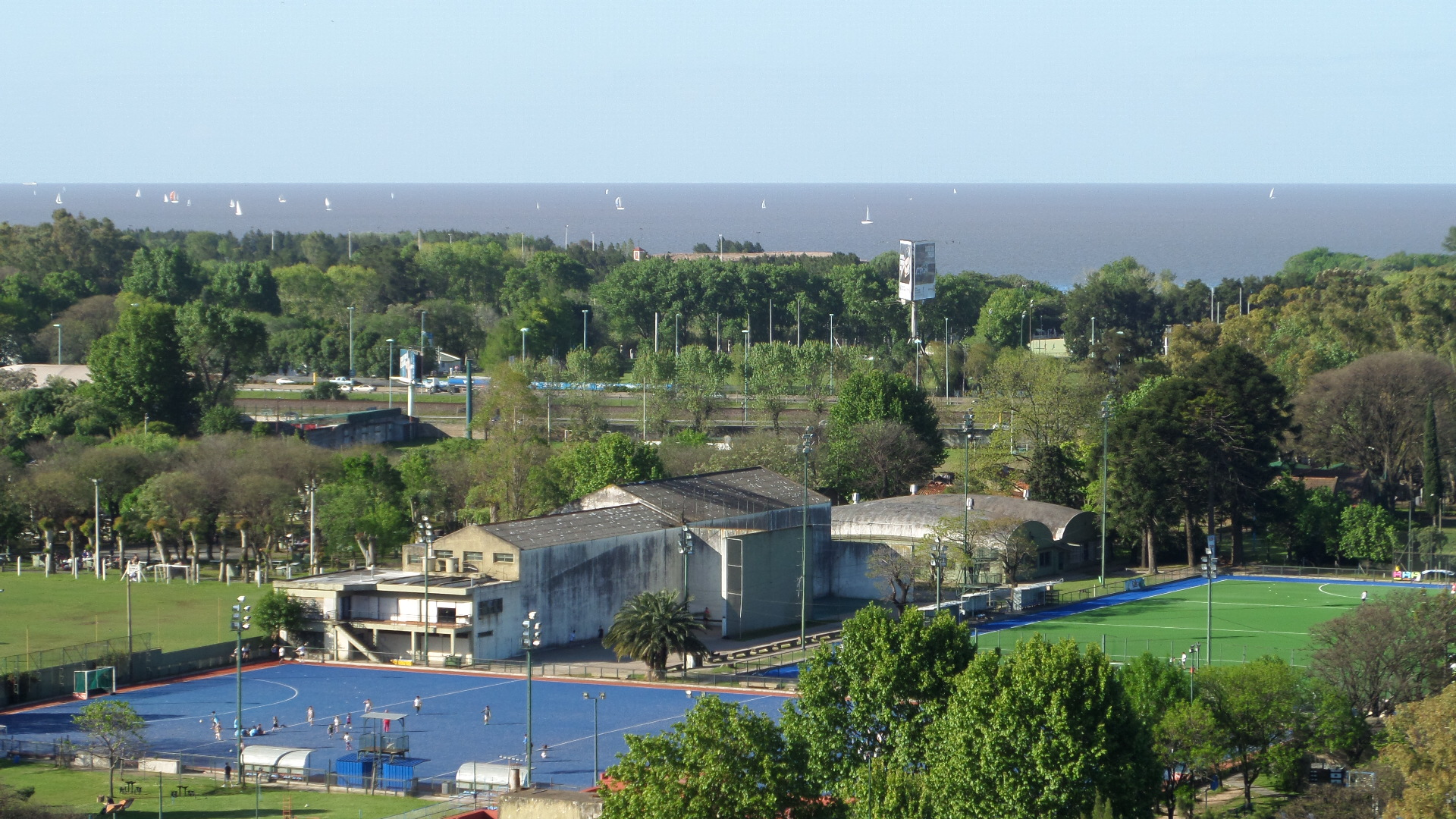
Aerial view of the club's field hockey pitches

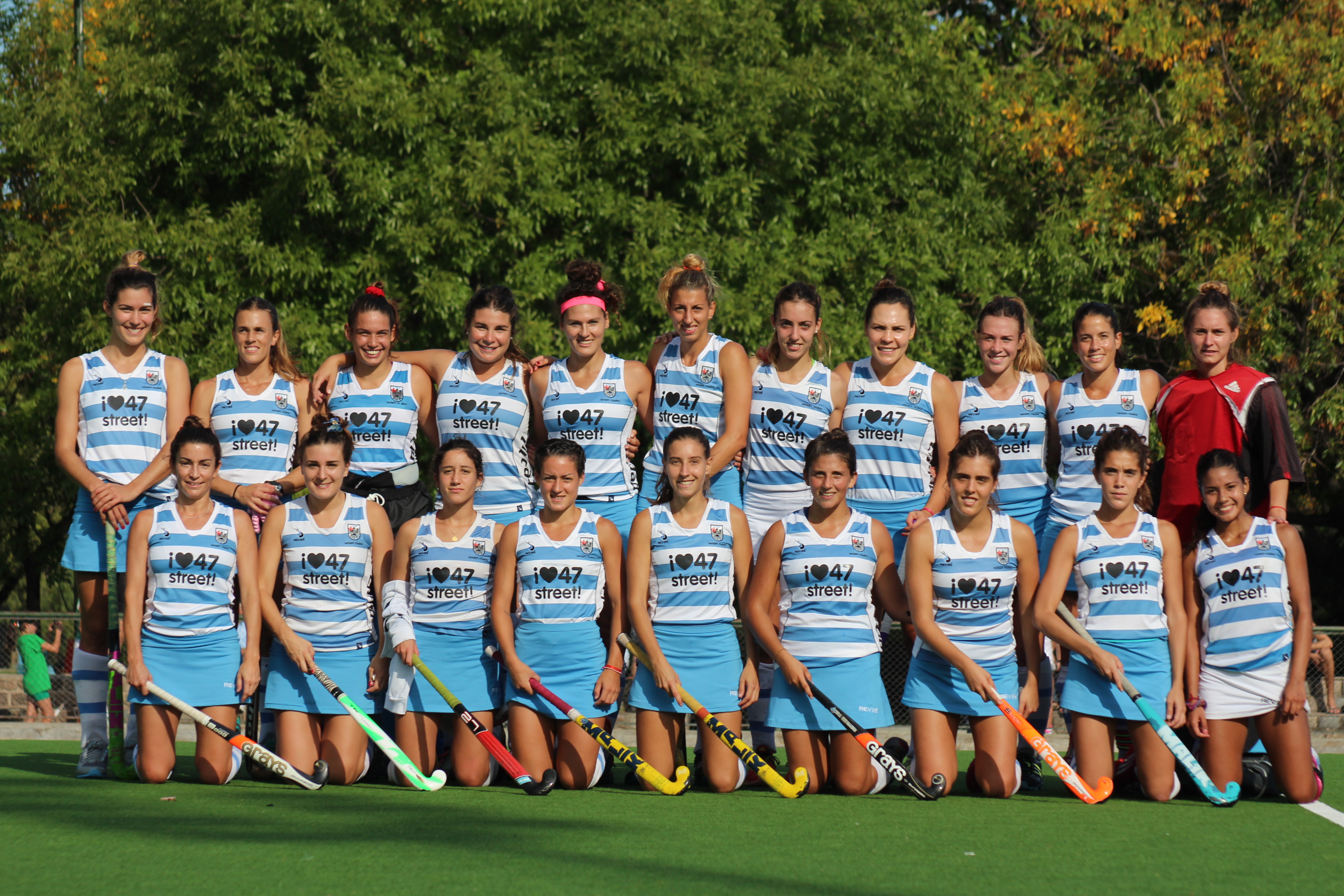
Women's team that won the Metropolitano in 2014

Field hockey is one of the most representative sports of the club, with competitive teams in both men's and women's divisions. The hockey squads (men's and women's) currently play at Metropolitano de Primera División, the top division of Argentine hockey league system.

The men's team is one of the most successful teams of the Buenos Aires league, having won 14 Metropolitano titles, the last in 2014 when the squad defeated Banco Provincia 1–0. On the other hand, the women's team has won five Metropolitano titles, the last also in 2014 after defeating GEBA 1–0 with goal by Noel Barrionuevo.

Notable hockey players for Ciudad include Cecilia Rognoni (one of Ciudad's hockey pitch was named in his honour), and Carla Rebecchi.

=== Rugby ===
Although the institution had been founded in 1920, the rugby union team was not formed until 1938. The same year the team was affiliated to the Argentine Rugby Union, taking part in the "Competencia" tournament. The rugby union team is currently member of the Unión de Rugby de Buenos Aires (URBA) playing in Primera División B, the second division of Union's league system.

In 1972 the team promoted to the second division, with 486 points scored and only 99 conceded. The top scorer was Emilio "Cachavacha" Aliaga, team's fullback. A years later Ciudad would be dissolved but was formed again in 1983, with some of the former 1972 players and many other from the youth categories taking part of the team.

In 1986 the top division of Club Ciudad was the "Torneo de Ascenso" sub-champion. In 1994 the team was relegated to lower category but promoted in 1997 after a restructuring of the tournaments by the Argentine Rugby Union.

== Honours ==
=== Field hockey ===
Men's

- Metropolitano Primera División (14): 1976, 1977, 1979, 1981, 1984, 1985, 1986, 1987, 1988, 1990, 1991, 1997, 1999, 2014

Women's

- Metropolitano Primera División (5): 1998, 1999, 2000, 2004, 2014

== Concerts ==
Club Ciudad has held many concerts since 2008 to date, as part of the Pepsi Music Festival that takes part in Buenos Aires. Some of the artists that performed there are:

- Radiohead
- Faith No More
- Pet Shop Boys
- Zero 7
- Tahiti 80
- Gogol Bordello
- Maxïmo Park
- The Ting Tings
- Calle 13
- Kraftwerk
- Keane
- Jesus & Mary Chain
- Stone Temple Pilots
- Depeche Mode
- The Offspring
- R.E.M.
- Kaiser Chiefs
- The Mars Volta
- The Black Eyed Peas
- New Order
- Madness
- Ian Brown
- The Rasmus
- The Bravery
- The Dandy Warhols
- Snoop Dogg
- Beastie Boys
- Daft Punk
- Patti Smith
- Yeah Yeah Yeahs
- Mötley Crüe
- TV on the Radio
- The Strokes
- Kings of Leon
- M.I.A.
- Elvis Costello
- Massive Attack
- rinôçérôse
- The Slackers
- The Human League
