= Club San Patricio =

Argentine rugby union and field hockey club

(Argentina) San Patricio
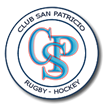
- Full name: Club San Patricio
- Union: URBA
- Nickname: Sanpa
- Founded: 17 March 1973; 52 years ago
- Location: La Lonja, Pilar Partido, Argentina
- Ground: La Lonja
- President: Adrian Ricardo Musa
- Coach: Luis Maria Cacciabue
- League: URBA Primera B
- 2025: 6th.
Team kit

Club San Patricio, or just San Patricio, is an Argentine rugby union and field hockey club, located in La Lonja, a locality in Pilar Partido, Buenos Aires Province. The club was founded on March 17, 1973, by a group of young enthusiasts with the purpose of practising amateur rugby. Luis Cacciabue was the first president of the institution. Women's field hockey would be later added as sport.

The rugby union team currently plays in Primera División B, the third division of the URBA league system.

== History ==
The institution was founded by dissident players from club Obras Sanitarias to establish their own rugby club. The name was taken from the Irish saint, setting its foundation on Saint Patrick's Day, and Luis María Cacciabue was elected as club's first president. The club was initially located in Núñez, but it soon moved to Pilar, an almost deserted town by then. The club set its new location on a dirt road next to the General Manuel Belgrano Railway tracks and distant 500 meters from Acceso Norte.

The club affiliated to URBA playing its first tournament in 1974, when the squad debuted vs San Albano. San Patricio's first hightlight came in 1982 when it won the Segunda División championship and promoted to Primera División (current Torneo de la URBA).

A field hockey section was later added. In 2010, San Patricio inaugurated its first artificial turf field for that sport. Hockey's increased growth caused it became the main sport in the club.
