= Club Atlético Banco de la Provincia de Buenos Aires =

Banco Provincia
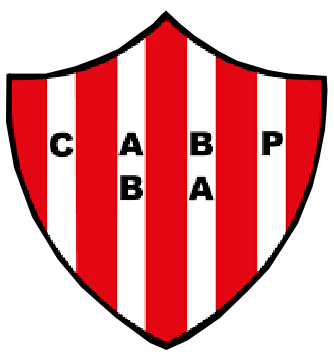
- Full name: Club Atlético Banco de la Provincia de Buenos Aires
- League: Metropolitano
- Founded: May 17, 1918; 107 years ago
- Home ground: H. Yrigoyen 803, Vicente López, Argentina (Capacity 2,000)

Personnel
- Chairman: Hugo Marré
- Website: clubbancoprovincia.com.ar
Home

Club Atlético Banco de la Provincia de Buenos Aires, simply known as Banco Provincia is a sports club based in the city of Vicente López in the homonymous partido of Greater Buenos Aires. The club, mostly known for its men's and women's field hockey teams, hosts a wide variety of sports such as basketball, football, gymnastics, golf, swimming, tennis, martial arts amongst other sports and social activities.

The men's team has won 8 Metropolitano titles, being the last one in 2015, when both teams, men's and women's, won their respective championships.

== History ==
The club was founded by a group of employees of the Bank of the Province of Buenos Aires on May 17. Its first president was Mauricio Reusmann. The first headquarters was in the Buenos Aires neighborhood of Barracas, at the intersection of Iriarte and Santa Elena streets. Sports were also practiced in Avellaneda and Palermo districts, until in the 1930s the club settled on Avenida del Libertador (then, "Blandengues") in Vicente López close to Rio de la Plata.

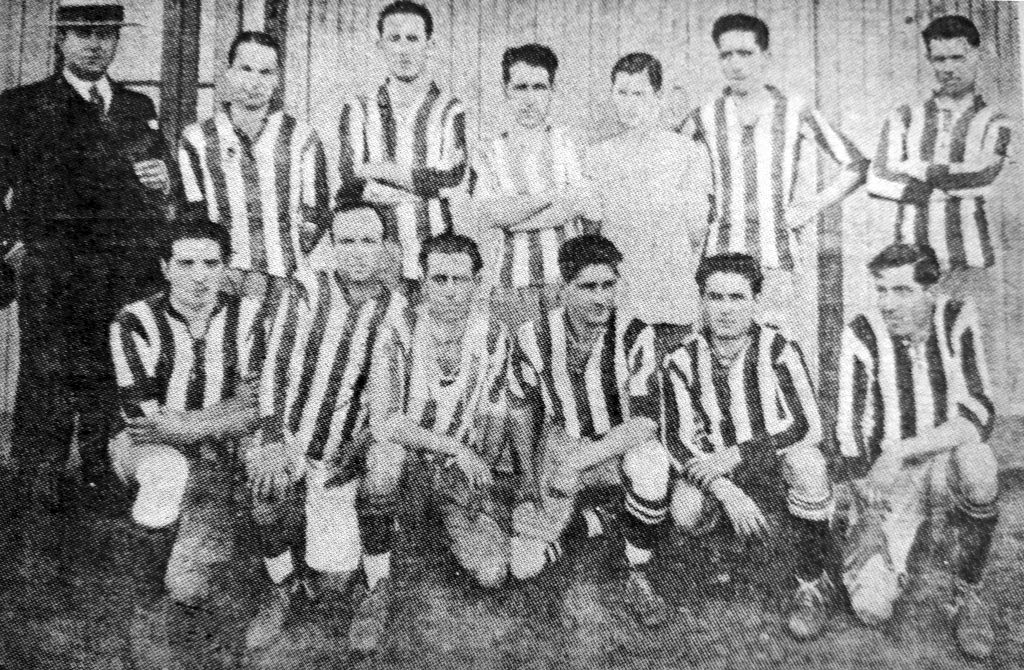
Banco Provincia football team of 1924

At that venue, the football team won several championships while the tennis section began to participate in the interclub tournaments of the Association. Members practised swimming in Rio de la Plata as the club did not have a pool. Basketball, bowls, table tennis, and chess, were also played. The rugby section was added in 1932.

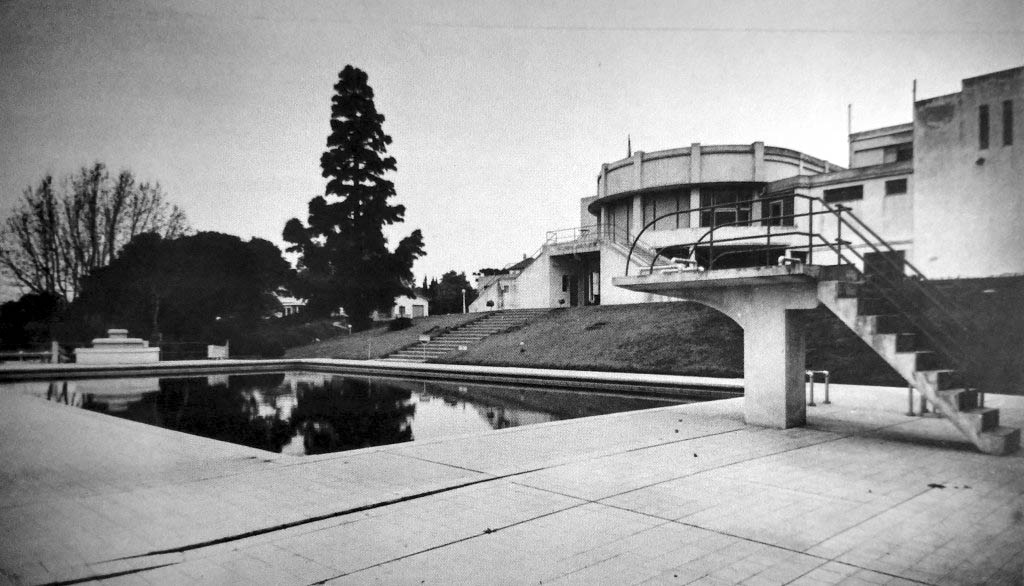
Banco Provincia headquarters as seen in 1949

In 1939, the land currently occupied by the club on Hipólito Yrigoyen street was acquired. The new headquarters was inaugurated on December 21, 1940 under the presidency of Bartolomé Mas Sabio. During the 1940s the first swimming pool, a skating rink and a bowling alley were built. The football squad won five championships (1944, 1945, 1946, 1947 and 1949), while José López Varela was a notable athlete of that time. In that decade, the club participated for the first time in a yachting event.

In 1950 the club added a field hockey section and the sport would become one of the main ones for the club. In those years the club registered with the Argentine Basketball Federation championship. The team won the first division bank tournaments of the years 1954, 1956, 1957, 1958, and 1959. Bowls was another successful sport, winning championships in 1950, 1951, 1952, 1953, 1954, 1955, and 1956.

In the 1960s the headquarters were expanded. A recreation area was acquired on an island in Tigre, and the first zonal headquarters were incorporated in the interior of the province of Buenos Aires. Football's success continued with the championships of 1961, 1962, 1964, 1965, 1966, 1967, 1968 and 1969, under the technical direction of Domingo Figliomeni. A women's field hockey section was added in those years. In the 1970s, long-distance runner Miguel Sánchez was a notable athlete for the club. He later disappeared during the National Reorganization Process, the military dictatorship installed in 1976. Since the year 2000, an athletic test (la carrera de Miguel) has been organized that bears his name.

Football's predominance extended in the 1980s, when the team won 14 consecutive championships, while field hockey has consolidated since 1999, when the men's team won their first Metropolitano championship, having won a total of 11 titles to date.

== Notable players ==
=== Field hockey ===
Delfina Merino started to play in Banco Provincia at 5 years old, and made her debut in the senior squad in 2007. She was part of the team that promoted to Primera División in 2013, then winning the first Metropolitano title for the club in 2015. Delfino was also an international player with Argentina from 2009 to 2022.

Another international player, Carla Rebecchi, started playing hockey at Banco Provincia at age 6, nevertheless six years later she moved to Club Ciudad de Buenos Aires, where she developed her entire domestic career.

== Titles ==
=== Men's field hockey ===
- Metropolitano de Primera División (11):

1999, 2000, 2002, 2004, 2011, 2012, 2013, 2015, 2016, 2018, 2019
