= Club Italiano =

Argentine sports club

- Founded: 29 December 1898; 127 years ago
- Location: Buenos Aires, Argentina
- Activities: List: basketball; basque pelota; field hockey; football; gymnastics; judo; rugby union; swimming; tennis; volleyball
- Chairman: Luis Pino
- Colors: (Red, White, Green)
- Website: clubitaliano.com.ar

Club Italiano is an Argentine sports club which headquarters located in Caballito, Buenos Aires. The hosts many activities such as basketball, basque pelota, field hockey, football, gymnastics, martial arts, rugby union, swimming, tennis and volleyball.

The rugby union team currently plays in the Torneo de la URBA Grupo II, the second division of the Unión de Rugby de Buenos Aires league system. Club's stadium is located in Bajo Flores, Buenos Aires.

== History ==
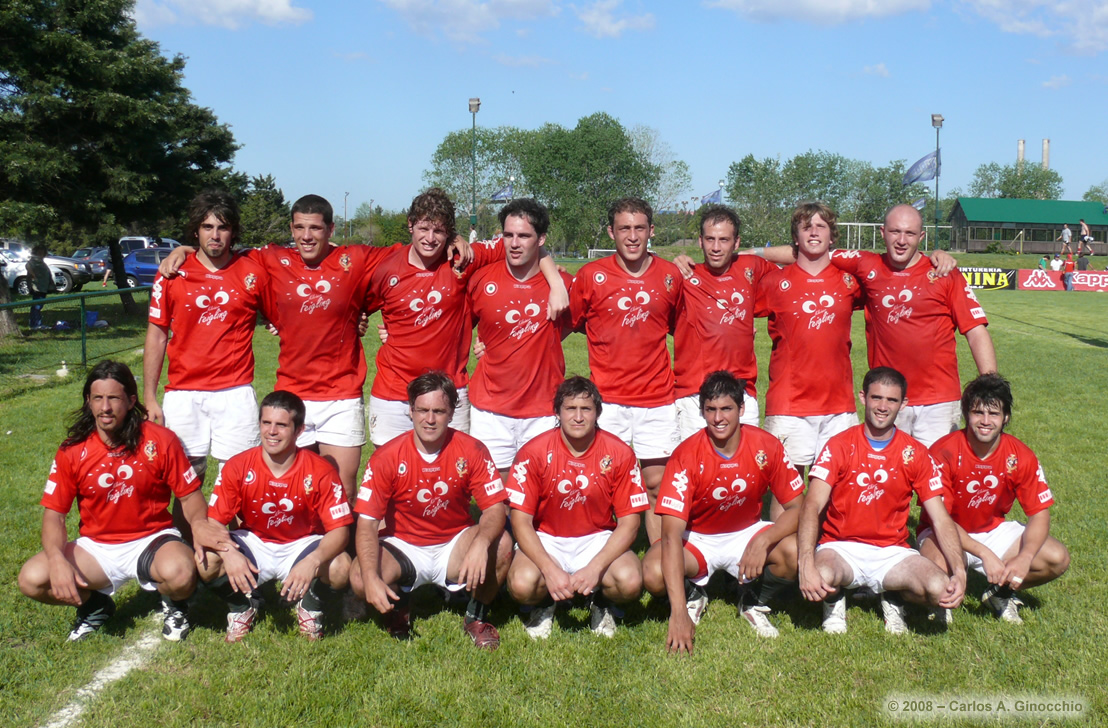
The rugby union team in 2008

The club was founded on December 29, 1898, by a group of Italian immigrants and their descendants. The club was conceived as a cycling institution due to Italian immigrants being enthusiastic about bicycles. For that reason the club was originally named as "Club Ciclístico Italiano". As other sports were added, the name changed to its current denomination in 1912.

Italiano rented the Recreo Belvedere facilities during 10 years, until the club moved to its current location on Rivadavia Avenue in Caballito neighborhood. In 1980, Italiano acquired 17 hectares to Municipality of Buenos Aires, where its sports facilities were built. The club currently has about 7,000 members.

== Titles ==
- URBA Primera C (1): 2023
