= 2022 Rugby World Cup Sevens squads – Men =

The rosters of all participating teams at the men's tournament of the 2022 Rugby World Cup Sevens.

== Argentina ==
The following team was announced as the 2022 Rugby World Cup Sevens sevens team.

Head coach: Santiago Gómez Cora

No.	Player	Date of birth (age)
1	Joaquín de la Vega	26 May 1998 (aged 24)
2	Agustín Fraga	6 March 2002 (aged 20)
3	Luciano González	10 April 1997 (aged 25)
4	Matteo Graziano	21 June 2001 (aged 21)
5	Rodrigo Isgró	24 March 1999 (aged 23)
6	Alejo Lavayén	5 May 2000 (aged 22)
7	Tomás Lizazú	22 November 2001 (aged 20)
8	Marcos Moneta	7 March 2000 (aged 22)
9	Matías Osadczuk	22 April 1997 (aged 25)
10	Gastón Revol (captain)	26 November 1986 (aged 35)
11	Franco Rosetto	2 March 2004 (aged 18)
12	Germán Schulz	5 February 1994 (aged 28)
13	Santiago Vera Feld	29 March 2001 (aged 21)
14	Tobías Wade	6 August 1999 (aged 23)

== Australia ==
The following team was announced as the 2022 Rugby World Cup Sevens sevens team.

Head coach: John Manenti

No.	Player	Date of birth (age)
1	Henry Hutchison	12 February 1997 (aged 25)
2	Bill Meakes	23 February 1991 (aged 31)
3	Corey Toole	7 March 2000 (aged 22)
4	Dietrich Roache	6 July 2001 (aged 21)
5	James Turner	29 August 1998 (aged 24)
6	Henry Paterson	26 February 1997 (aged 25)
7	Josh Turner	23 September 1995 (aged 26)
8	Matt Gonzalez	1 June 1994 (aged 28)
9	Stu Dunbar	2 April 1992 (aged 30)
10	Nick Malouf (captain)	19 March 1993 (aged 29)
11	Maurice Longbottom	30 January 1995 (aged 27)
12	Nathan Lawson	23 January 1999 (aged 23)
13	Ben Marr	8 April 1997 (aged 25)

== Canada ==
The following team was announced as the 2022 Rugby World Cup Sevens sevens team.

Head coach: Henry Paul

No.	Player	Date of birth (age)
1	Anton Ngongo	22 July 1997 (aged 25)
2	Jake Thiel	2 June 1997 (aged 25)
3	Thomas Isherwood	23 August 2000 (aged 22)
4	Phil Berna	7 April 1996 (aged 26)
5	Alex Russell	22 June 1996 (aged 26)
6	Josiah Morra	7 February 1998 (aged 24)
7	Brock Webster	21 August 2000 (aged 22)
8	Matthew Oworu	29 July 2000 (aged 22)
9	D’Shawn Bowen	12 September 1996 (aged 25)
10	Lachlan Kratz	27 March 2000 (aged 22)
11	Elias Ergas	28 January 1998 (aged 24)
12	Ciaran Breen	19 April 2001 (aged 21)

== Chile ==
The following team was announced as the 2022 Rugby World Cup Sevens sevens team.

Head coach: Joaquin Todeschini

No.	Player	Date of birth (age)
1	Felipe Brangier	5 November 1988 (aged 33)
2	Luca Strabucchi	15 June 1999 (aged 23)
3	Clemente Armstrong	29 May 2001 (aged 21)
4	Benjamín Videla	24 April 2001 (aged 21)
5	Diego Warnken	20 August 2001 (aged 21)
6	Vicente Urbina	9 January 2001 (aged 21)
7	Vicente Tredinick	21 February 2000 (aged 22)
8	Ernesto Tchimino	21 March 2001 (aged 21)
9	Cristóbal Game Jiménez	9 July 2002 (aged 20)
10	Joaquin Huici	1 February 1995 (aged 27)
11	Julio Blanc	6 July 1995 (aged 27)
12	Luca Avelli	23 August 1997 (aged 25)

== England ==
The following team was announced as the 2022 Rugby World Cup Sevens sevens team.

Head coach: Tony Roques

No.	Player	Date of birth (age)
1	Jamie Adamson	1 January 2000 (aged 22)
2	Ethan Waddleton	23 November 1996 (aged 25)
3	Alex Davis	3 October 1992 (aged 29)
4	Jamie Barden	10 September 1999 (aged 22)
5	Api Bavadra	12 June 2000 (aged 22)
6	Tom Mitchell	22 July 1989 (aged 33)
7	Calum Randle	18 January 2000 (aged 22)
8	Tom Bowen	31 January 1993 (aged 29)
9	Freddie Roddick	18 January 1999 (aged 23)
10	Tom Emery	2 July 1998 (aged 24)
11	Charlton Kerr	6 October 1997 (aged 24)
12	Will Homer	24 October 1995 (aged 26)

== Fiji ==
The following team was announced as the 2022 Rugby World Cup Sevens sevens team.

Head coach: Ben Gollings

No.	Player	Date of birth (age)
1	Josua Vakurunabili	10 June 1992 (aged 30)
2	Joseva Talacolo	1 April 1997 (aged 25)
3	Jerry Matana	14 July 1998 (aged 24)
4	Sevuloni Mocenacagi	29 June 1990 (aged 32)
5	Iosefo Masi	9 May 1998 (aged 24)
6	Filipe Sauturaga	19 June 1994 (aged 28)
7	Filipo Bukayaro	18 March 1999 (aged 23)
8	Waisea Nacuqu	24 May 1993 (aged 29)
9	Jerry Tuwai	23 March 1989 (aged 33)
10	Kaminieli Rasaku	12 July 1999 (aged 23)
11	Vuiviawa Naduvalo	23 May 1996 (aged 26)
12	Elia Canakaivata	12 July 1996 (aged 26)

== France ==
The following team was announced as the 2022 Rugby World Cup Sevens sevens team.

Head coach: Jerome Daret

No.	Player	Date of birth (age)
1	Jonathan Laugel	30 January 1993 (aged 29)
2	Nisié Huyard	23 May 1994 (aged 28)
3	Tavite Veredamu	1 September 1989 (aged 33)
4	William Iraguha	27 June 1997 (aged 25)
5	Stephen Parez	1 August 1994 (aged 28)
6	Paulin Riva	20 April 1994 (aged 28)
7	Nelson Épée	20 February 2001 (aged 21)
8	Pierre Mignot	13 April 1996 (aged 26)
9	Aaron Grandidier	18 May 2000 (aged 22)
10	Jean-Pascal Barraque	24 April 1991 (aged 31)
11	Joachim Trouabal	18 August 2000 (aged 22)
12	Esteban Capilla	5 January 2003 (aged 19)

== Germany ==
The following team was announced as the 2022 Rugby World Cup Sevens sevens team.

Head coach: Philip Snyman

No.	Player	Date of birth (age)
1	Max Calitz	17 July 1993 (aged 29)
2	Bastian van der Bosch	3 September 1991 (aged 31)
3	Chris Umeh	9 May 2001 (aged 21)
4	Niklas Koch	15 December 1997 (aged 24)
5	Sam Rainger	27 March 1991 (aged 31)
6	Fabian Heimpel	21 August 1990 (aged 32)
7	Carlos Soteras Merz	26 October 1990 (aged 31)
8	Ben Ellermann	12 February 1998 (aged 24)
9	Anton Gleitze	10 April 2000 (aged 22)
10	Jack Hunt	20 July 2000 (aged 22)
11	Tim Lichtenberg	2 February 1997 (aged 25)
12	Anjo Buckman	1 March 1989 (aged 33)

== Hong Kong ==
The following team was announced as the 2022 Rugby World Cup Sevens sevens team.

Head coach: Paul John

No.	Player	Date of birth (age)
1	Alessandro Nardoni	3 October 1996 (aged 25)
2	Michael Coverdale	12 March 1995 (aged 27)
3	Callum McCullough	1 December 1993 (aged 28)
4	Pierce Mackinlay-West	7 December 1996 (aged 25)
5	Harry Sayers	19 September 1996 (aged 25)
6	Cado Lee	27 December 1991 (aged 30)
7	Liam Doherty	6 January 2000 (aged 22)
8	Max Denmark	11 August 1999 (aged 23)
9	Hugo Stiles	17 August 1996 (aged 26)
10	Russell Webb	30 December 1993 (aged 28)
11	Seb Brien	20 August 1994 (aged 28)
12	Salom Yiu	4 February 1988 (aged 34)

== Ireland ==
The following team was announced as the 2022 Rugby World Cup Sevens sevens team.

Head coach: James Topping

No.	Player	Date of birth (age)
1	Jack Kelly	26 October 1997 (aged 24)
2	Andrew Smith	21 July 2000 (aged 22)
3	Harry McNulty	5 March 1993 (aged 29)
4	Bryan Mollen	25 September 1995 (aged 26)
5	Chay Mullins	23 January 2002 (aged 20)
6	Billy Dardis	31 January 1995 (aged 27)
7	Jordan Conroy	10 March 1994 (aged 28)
8	Hugo Lennox	6 March 1999 (aged 23)
9	Mark Roche	25 January 1993 (aged 29)
10	Terry Kennedy	4 July 1996 (aged 26)
11	Sean Cribbin	20 August 1998 (aged 24)
12	Matthew McDonald	4 March 1998 (aged 24)

== Jamaica ==
The following team was announced as the 2022 Rugby World Cup Sevens sevens team.

Head coach: Hughton Campbell

No.	Player	Date of birth (age)
1	Jack Rampton	6 May 2001 (aged 21)
2	Cameron Melville	19 January 2002 (aged 20)
3	Oscar Clayton	11 November 1998 (aged 23)
4	Ronaldeni Fraser	10 August 2002 (aged 20)
5	Rhordi Adamson	29 October 1993 (aged 28)
6	Fabion Turner	5 October 1991 (aged 30)
7	Tyler Bush	13 May 1996 (aged 26)
8	Gareth Stoppani	11 April 1990 (aged 32)
9	Ashley Smith	18 June 1991 (aged 31)
10	Anthony Bingham	12 June 1984 (aged 38)
11	Ryan Denvir	13 March 2001 (aged 21)
12	Omar Dixon	12 September 1990 (aged 31)

== Kenya ==
The following team was announced as the 2022 Rugby World Cup Sevens sevens team.

Head coach: Damian McGrath

No.	Player	Date of birth (age)
1	Billy Odhiambo	7 November 1993 (aged 28)
2	Jeff Oluoch	2 April 1995 (aged 27)
3	Anthony Omondi	26 March 1995 (aged 27)
4	Herman Humwa	8 November 1995 (aged 26)
5	Nelson Oyoo (captain)	26 June 1994 (aged 28)
6	Johnstone Olindi	4 November 1999 (aged 22)
7	Edmund Anya	15 June 1998 (aged 24)
8	Willy Ambaka	14 May 1990 (aged 32)
9	Vincent Onyala	10 December 1996 (aged 25)
10	Collins Injera	18 October 1986 (aged 35)
11	Kevin Wekesa	7 August 2000 (aged 22)
12	Samuel Oliech	15 December 1993 (aged 28)

== New Zealand ==
The following team was announced as the 2022 Rugby World Cup Sevens sevens team.

Head coach: Clark Laidlaw

No.	Player	Date of birth (age)
1	Scott Curry	17 May 1988 (age 34)
2	Amanaki Nicole	8 February 1992 (age 30)
3	Tone Ng Shiu	26 May 1994 (age 28)
4	Akuila Rokolisoa	27 June 1995 (age 27)
5	Ngarohi McGarvey-Black	20 May 1996 (age 26)
6	Sam Dickson	28 October 1989 (age 32)
7	Caleb Tangitau	19 March 2003 (age 19)
8	Regan Ware	7 August 1994 (age 28)
9	Kurt Baker	7 October 1988 (age 33)
10	Moses Leo	11 August 1997 (age 25)
11	Sione Molia	5 September 1993 (age 29)
12	Lewis Ormond	5 February 1994 (age 28)

== Portugal ==
The following team was announced as the 2022 Rugby World Cup Sevens sevens team.

Head coach: Frederico Sousa

No.	Player	Date of birth (age)
1	Duarte Moreira	9 October 1998 (aged 23)
2	Vasco Ribeiro	13 October 1997 (aged 24)
3	João Afra Rosa	1 December 2002 (aged 19)
4	Nuno Sousa Guedes	21 November 1994 (aged 27)
5	José Santos	3 April 2001 (aged 21)
6	José Vilar Gomes	19 March 2002 (aged 20)
7	Rodrigo Freudenthal	17 December 1997 (aged 24)
8	Diogo Sarmento	21 October 1998 (aged 23)
9	Manuel Vareiro	14 January 2005 (aged 17)
10	Diogo Rodrigues	4 March 2001 (aged 21)
11	João Vaz Antunes	17 May 1995 (aged 27)
12	Fábio Conceição	2 August 1996 (aged 26)

== Samoa ==
The following team was announced as the 2022 Rugby World Cup Sevens sevens team.

Head coach: Brian Lima

No.	Player	Date of birth (age)
1	Vaovasa Afa Su'a	11 October 1991 (aged 30)
2	Va'afauese Apelu Maliko	10 November 1998 (aged 23)
3	Uaina Sione	3 January 1996 (aged 26)
4	Motu Opetai	20 June 2001 (aged 21)
5	Levi Milford	18 September 2001 (aged 20)
6	Melani Matavao	19 November 1995 (aged 26)
7	Neueli Leitufia	24 October 2001 (aged 20)
8	Paul Eti Slater	12 September 1993 (aged 28)
9	Paulo Scanlan	9 August 1996 (aged 26)
10	Owen Niue	6 April 2000 (aged 22)
11	Steve Onosa'i	19 September 2001 (aged 20)
12	Malolo Luteru	10 August 2001 (aged 21)

== Scotland ==
The following team was announced as the 2022 Rugby World Cup Sevens sevens team.

Head coach: Ciaran Beattie

No.	Player	Date of birth (age)
1	Freddie Owsley	6 January 1997 (aged 25)
2	Matt Davidson	6 November 1999 (aged 22)
3	Callum Young	28 December 1997 (aged 24)
4	Kaleem Barreto	19 December 1998 (aged 23)
5	Harvey Elms	2 June 1995 (aged 27)
6	Paddy Kelly	18 October 1995 (aged 26)
7	Jamie Farndale (captain)	21 February 1994 (aged 28)
8	Finlay Callaghan	15 August 2001 (aged 21)
9	Reiss Cullen	10 May 1996 (aged 26)
10	Femi Sofolarin	22 January 2000 (aged 22)
11	Lee Jones	28 June 1988 (aged 34)
12	Aaron Purewal	2 February 1998 (aged 24)

== South Africa ==
The following team was announced as the 2022 Rugby World Cup Sevens sevens team.

Head coach: Neil Powell

No.	Player	Date of birth (age)
1	Cecil Afrika	3 March 1988 (aged 34)
2	Ronald Brown	2 September 1995 (aged 27)
3	Angelo Davids	1 June 1999 (aged 23)
4	Selvyn Davids	26 March 1994 (aged 28)
5	Muller du Plessis	25 June 1999 (aged 23)
6	Christie Grobbelaar	25 May 2000 (aged 22)
7	Sako Makata	10 September 1998 (aged 23)
8	James Murphy	30 November 1995 (aged 26)
9	Mfundo Ndhlovu	5 April 1997 (aged 25)
10	Ryan Oosthuizen	22 May 1995 (aged 27)
11	JC Pretorius	29 January 1998 (aged 24)
12	Siviwe Soyizwapi (captain)	7 December 1992 (aged 29)
13	Impi Visser	30 May 1995 (aged 27)
14	Shaun Williams	13 April 1998 (aged 24)

== South Korea ==
The following team was announced as the 2022 Rugby World Cup Sevens sevens team.

Head coach: Charles Louw

No.	Player	Date of birth (age)
1	Choi Seong-deok	31 May 1999 (aged 23)
2	Lee Jin-kyu	4 July 1994 (aged 28)
3	Kim Chan-ju	28 March 2002 (aged 20)
4	Chang Yong-heung	12 November 1993 (aged 28)
5	Yoo Jae-hyuk	28 February 1993 (aged 29)
6	Kim Hyun-soo	8 November 1998 (aged 23)
7	Jeong Yeon-sik	8 May 1993 (aged 29)
8	Kim Yo-han	1 January 1993 (aged 29)
9	Park Wan-yong	2 June 1984 (aged 38)
10	Kim Nam-uk	5 February 1990 (aged 32)
11	Kim Gwong-min	2 April 1988 (aged 34)
12	Jang Jeong-min	10 November 1994 (aged 27)

== Tonga ==
The following team was announced as the 2022 Rugby World Cup Sevens sevens team.

Head coach: Tevita Tuʻifua

No.	Player	Date of birth (age)
1	Sione Tupou	25 May 1994 (aged 28)
2	Niukula Osika	31 January 1997 (aged 25)
3	Samson Fualalo	21 July 1995 (aged 27)
4	Soni Asi	12 October 1989 (aged 32)
5	Latuselu Vailea	24 September 1992 (aged 29)
6	Edward Sunia	3 October 1990 (aged 31)
7	Amanaki Veamatahau	22 May 1996 (aged 26)
8	John Ika	10 April 1992 (aged 30)
9	Atieli Pakalani	2 August 1989 (aged 33)
10	Rodney Tongotea	18 February 1999 (aged 23)
11	John Tapueluelu	7 April 1996 (aged 26)
12	Isileli Aholelei	28 November 1998 (aged 23)

== Uganda ==
The following team was announced as the 2022 Rugby World Cup Sevens sevens team.

Head coach: Tolbert Onyango

No.	Player	Date of birth (age)
1	Alex Aturinda	26 November 1997 (aged 24)
2	Ivan Claude Otema	17 May 1999 (aged 23)
3	Ian Munyani	27 October 1997 (aged 24)
4	William Nkore	7 May 1997 (aged 25)
5	Phillip Wokorack	31 December 1993 (aged 28)
6	Micheal Wokorach	14 August 1990 (aged 32)
7	Nobert Okeny	30 October 1998 (aged 23)
8	Desire Ayera	9 January 1999 (aged 23)
9	Aaron Oforyowth	7 October 1997 (aged 24)
10	Adrian Kasito	30 October 1995 (aged 26)
11	Timothy Kisiga	2 December 1996 (aged 25)
12	Karim Arinaitwe	23 July 1999 (aged 23)

== United States ==
The following team was announced as the 2022 Rugby World Cup Sevens sevens team.

Head coach: Mike Friday

No.	Player	Date of birth (age)
1	Perry Baker	29 June 1986 (aged 36)
2	Ben Broselle	23 May 1999 (aged 23)
3	Maceo Brown	1 September 1995 (aged 27)
4	Aaron Cummings	1 July 1997 (aged 25)
5	Gavan D'Amore	2 November 1992 (aged 29)
6	Malacchi Esdale	4 May 1995 (aged 27)
7	Naima Fuala'au	17 June 1998 (aged 24)
8	Lucas Lacamp	4 June 2001 (aged 21)
9	Cody Melphy	5 April 1993 (aged 29)
10	David Still	23 August 1998 (aged 24)
11	Faitala Talapusi	3 December 1999 (aged 22)
12	Stephen Tomasin (captain)	25 September 1994 (aged 27)
13	Maka Unufe	28 September 1991 (aged 30)

== Uruguay ==
The following team was announced as the 2022 Rugby World Cup Sevens sevens team.

Head coach: Ivo Dugonjic

No.	Player	Date of birth (age)
1	Carlos Deus	5 July 2001 (aged 21)
2	Marcos Pastore	1 April 1997 (aged 25)
3	Tomás Etcheverry	14 February 1991 (aged 31)
4	Tomas Inciarte	22 October 1996 (aged 25)
5	Valentín Grille	15 June 1998 (aged 24)
6	Diego Ardao	4 August 1995 (aged 27)
7	Mateo Viñals	7 October 1998 (aged 23)
8	Baltazar Amaya	26 May 1999 (aged 23)
9	Guillermo Lijtenstein	14 September 1990 (aged 31)
10	Felipe Etcheverry	23 June 1996 (aged 26)
11	Koba Brazionis	7 October 1998 (aged 23)
12	James McCubbin	27 May 1998 (aged 24)

== Wales ==
The following team was announced as the 2022 Rugby World Cup Sevens sevens team.

Head coach: Richie Pugh

No.	Player	Date of birth (age)
1	Luke Treharne	18 January 1993 (aged 29)
2	Iestyn Rees	5 October 1999 (aged 22)
3	Morgan Sieniawski	11 January 1997 (aged 25)
4	Owen Jenkins	20 July 1993 (aged 29)
5	Tom Brown	12 December 1998 (aged 23)
6	Callum Carson	13 March 1999 (aged 23)
7	Iwan Pyrs Jones	6 May 2003 (aged 19)
8	Morgan Williams	28 December 1995 (aged 26)
9	Cole Swannack	16 October 1998 (aged 23)
10	Kane Teear-Bourge	17 November 1998 (aged 23)
11	Ewan Rosser	16 December 2000 (aged 21)
12	Chris Smith	21 August 1994 (aged 28)

== Zimbabwe ==
The following team was announced as the 2022 Rugby World Cup Sevens sevens team.

Head coach: Graham Kaulback

No.	Player	Date of birth (age)
1	Tapiwa Mulenga	19 September 1997 (aged 24)
2	Kudzai Mashawi (captain)	7 January 1993 (aged 29)
3	Keegan Cooke	4 March 1982 (aged 40)
4	Ryan Musumhi	30 July 1997 (aged 25)
5	Godfrey Magaramombe	1 August 1998 (aged 24)
6	Shingirai Katsvere	10 May 1997 (aged 25)
7	Jerry Jaravaza	5 March 1998 (aged 24)
8	Munopa Muneta	8 June 1998 (aged 24)
9	Carlos Matematema	20 November 2001 (aged 20)
10	Sam Phiri	5 August 1998 (aged 24)
11	Nigel Tinarwo	3 January 2000 (aged 22)
12	Munesu Muneta	8 June 1998 (aged 24)
