= Rugby sevens at the 2023 Pan American Games – Men's tournament =

Men's rugby sevens at the XVIV Pan American Games
- Host nation: Chile

Cup
- Champion: Argentina
- Runner-up: Chile
- Third: Canada

Tournament details
- Matches played: 20
- Tries scored: 121 (average 6.05 per match)
- Most points: (Argentina) Santiago Mare (49)
- Most tries: 2 players

The rugby sevens men's tournament at the 2023 Pan American Games in Santiago, Chile was held on 3–4 November 2023, with eight teams participating at the Estadio Municipal de La Pintana.

This is the fourth appearance of Rugby sevens at the Pan American Games. Argentina won its second consecutive title.

== Qualification ==
Eight men's teams qualified to compete in the tournament games. Two World Sevens Series core teams (Canada and United States) qualified automatically, along with five other teams in various qualifying tournaments.

=== Summary ===
Event	Dates	Location	Quota(s)	Qualified
Host Nation	—	—	1	Chile
Automatic qualification	—	—	2	Canada; United States
2022 South American Games	7–9 October	(Paraguay) Asunción	2	Argentina; Uruguay
2022 RAN Super Sevens	11–13 November	Mexico City	2	Jamaica; Mexico
2022 Sudamérica Rugby Sevens	26–27 November	(Costa Rica) San Jose	1	Brazil
Total			8	

== Results ==
All times are in Chile Time (UTC−4).

=== Pool stage ===
==== Pool A ====
Pos	Team	Pld	W	D	L	PF	PA	PD	Pts	Qualification
1	Argentina	3	3	0	0	103	24	+79	9	Semifinals
2	Chile	3	2	0	1	63	47	+16	7	Semifinals
3	Uruguay	3	1	0	2	53	59	−6	5	5–8th place semifinals
4	Jamaica	3	0	0	3	19	108	−89	3	5–8th place semifinals

Source: Santiago 2023
Rules for classification: 1) Points; 2) Head-to-head result; 3) Point difference; 4) Points scored; 5) draw.

3 November 2023
12:30

Argentina	40–7	Jamaica
Try: Mare (2) 4', 7'; Vera (2) 0', 2'; Moneta 3'; Graziano 6'; Con: Mare (3/4) 5', 8', 1'; Vera (2/2) 4', 7'	Report	Try: Anderson 2'; Con: Fraser (1/1) 2'

Estadio Municipal de La Pintana
Referee: Frank Méndez (Chile)

3 November 2023
12:55

Uruguay	7–24	Chile
Try: Amaya 7'; Con: Lijtenstein (1/1) 7'	Report	Try: Bustamante 3'; Lara 3'; Videla 4'; Con: Warnken (1/2) 4', 6'; Strabucchi (1/2) 5'

Estadio Municipal de La Pintana
Referee: Talal-Azmat Chaudhry (Canada)

3 November 2023
17:30

Jamaica	0–41	Uruguay
	Report	Try: Amaya (2) 1', 4'; Facciolo 3'; Ardao 0'; Arcos (2) 2', 6'; Basso 7'; Con: Álvarez (1/3) 3'; Ardao (1/1) 0'; Lijtenstein (1/3) 7'

Estadio Municipal de La Pintana
Referee: Gonzalo de Achaval (Argentina)

3 November 2023
17:55

Argentina	28–12	Chile
Try: Moneta 2'; Mare (2) 4', 7'; Lavayen 4'; Con: Mare (3/3) 2', 7', 5'; Pellandini (1/1) 5'	Report	Try: Garafulic 0'; Strabucchi 7'; Con: Warnken (1/1) 1'

Estadio Municipal de La Pintana
Referee: Francisco González (Uruguay)

3 November 2023
20:50

Argentina	35–5	Uruguay
Try: Osadczuk (2) 1', 3'; Mare 6'; González 4'; Lavayen 5'; Con: Mare (3/3) 2', 3', 6'; Lavayen (2/2) 4', 6'	Report	Try: Facciolo 7'

Estadio Municipal de La Pintana
Referee: Talal-Azmat Chaudhry (Canada)

3 November 2023
21:15

Chile	27–12	Jamaica
Try: Game (2) 3', 3'; Garafulic 5'; Salas 6'; Lara 5'; Con: Salas (1/2) 5'	Report	Try: Facey (2) 1', 7'; Con: McNally (1/1) 7'

Estadio Municipal de La Pintana
Referee: Cauã Santos (Brazil)

==== Pool B ====
Pos	Team	Pld	W	D	L	PF	PA	PD	Pts	Qualification
1	United States	3	3	0	0	84	17	+67	9	Semifinals
2	Canada	3	2	0	1	69	36	+33	7	Semifinals
3	Brazil	3	1	0	2	46	39	+7	5	5–8th place semifinals
4	Mexico	3	0	0	3	12	119	−107	3	5–8th place semifinals

Source: Santiago 2023
Rules for classification: 1) Points; 2) Head-to-head result; 3) Point difference; 4) Points scored; 5) draw.

3 November 2023
11:40

United States	48–7	Mexico
Try: Lacamp (2) 0', 0'; Hardirct II (3) 3', 3', 2'; Wendling 4'; Williams (2) 3', 9'; Con: Walsh (2/4) 2', 1', 2'; Hardrict II (1/1) 3'; Wendling 4'; Lacamp (1/1) 3'	Report	Try: Rodríguez Porras 3'; Con: Rodríguez Ramos (1/1) 7'

Estadio Municipal de La Pintana
Referee: Cauã Santos (Brazil)

3 November 2023
12:05

Canada	22–12	Brazil
Try: Richard (3) 0', 2', 6'; Hager 3'; Con: Kratz (1/2) 1'	Report	Try: Alves de Morais 5'; Duque 1'; Con: Da Silva (1/1) 1'

Estadio Municipal de La Pintana
Referee: Francisco González (Uruguay)

3 November 2023
16:40

United States	17–5	Brazil
Try: Wendling 6'; Vi 1'; Hardrict 3'; Con: Lacamp (1/3) 1'	Report	Try: Silveira 4'

Estadio Municipal de La Pintana
Referee: Talal-Azmat Chaudhry (Canada)

3 November 2023
17:05

Canada	42–5	Mexico
Try: McDougall 3'; Kratz (2) 8', 3'; Richard (2) 2', 8'; Thiel 4'; Con: Kratz (6/6) 6', 9', 2', 3', 4', 8'	Report	Try: Martín 6'

Estadio Municipal de La Pintana
Referee: Cauã Santos (Brazil)

3 November 2023
20:00

United States	19–5	Canada
Try: Vi (2) 1', 3'; Wendling 6'; Con: Lacamp (1/2) 1'; Walsh (1/1) 3'	Report	Try: McDougall 1'

Estadio Municipal de La Pintana
Referee: Gonzalo de Achaval (Argentina)

3 November 2023
20:25

Brazil	29–0	Mexico
Try: Alves 3'; Duque 5'; Teixeira 2'; Menezez 4'; Con: Duque (2/3) 3', 5'; Da Silva 7'	Report

Estadio Municipal de La Pintana
Referee: Francisca Gonzalez (Uruguay)

=== Classification round ===
Semi-finals
4 November — 10:50 — Santiago
Jamaica	14
Brazil	27
4 November — 11:15 — Santiago
Uruguay	40
Mexico	12

Fifth Place
4 November — 16.15 — Santiago
Uruguay	15
Brazil	14
Seventh Place
4 November — 15:50 — Santiago
Mexico	24
Jamaica	26

==== 5–8th place semifinals ====
4 November 2023
10:50

Jamaica	14–27	Brazil
Try: Rampton 3'; Fraser 5'; Con: Franklyn (2/2) 3', 6'	Report	Try: Da Silva 2'; Claudio 6'; Menezez (3) 1', 4', 7'; Con: Rainho (1/1) 7'

Estadio Municipal de La Pintana
Referee: Francisco Gonzalez (Uruguay)

4 November 2023
11:15

Uruguay	40–12	Mexico
Try: Facciolo 0'; Ardao 1'; Grille (2) 4', 3'; Viñals 7'; Álvarez 6'; Con: Lijtenstein (4/4) 0', 2', 4', 7'; Álvarez (1/2) 3'	Report	Try: Cole 3'; Carmona 7'; Con: Chavez (1/1) 7'

Estadio Municipal de La Pintana
Referee: Cauã Santos (Brazil)

==== Seventh place match ====
4 November 2023
15:50

Mexico	24–26	Jamaica
Try: Martínez-Elhore (2) 3', 6'; Galindo 5'; Falcón 3'; Con: Rodríguez Ramos (2/4) 6', 4'	Report	Try: Green 1'; Facey 8'; Anderson 0'; McNally 5'; Con: St. Claire (1/1) 2'; Franklyn (1/1) 0'; McNally (1/1) 5'

Estadio Municipal de La Pintana
Referee: Adrian Bogado (Paraguay)

==== Fifth place match ====
4 November 2023
16:15

Uruguay	15–14	Brazil
Try: Grille 0'; Basso 5'; Amaya 6'	Report	Try: Teixeira 3'; Claudio 6'; Con: Duque (2/2) 4', 6'

Estadio Municipal de La Pintana
Referee: Frank Méndez (Chile)

=== Medal round ===
Semi-finals
4 November — 12:30 — Santiago
Chile	15
United States	12
4 November — 12:55 — Santiago
Argentina	21
Canada	7

Final
4 November — 18:10 — Santiago
Argentina	24
Chile	5
Third Place
4 November — 17:10 — Santiago
Canada	19
United States	17

==== Semifinals ====
4 November 2023
12:30

Chile	15–12	United States
Try: Warnken (2) 3', 5'; Game 7'	Report	Try: Santos 3'; Bizer 7'; Con: Walsh (1/2) 3'

Estadio Municipal de La Pintana
Referee: Gonzalo de Achaval (Argentina)

4 November 2023
12:55

Argentina	21–7	Canada
Try: Lavayen 2'; Fraga 2'; Moneta 6'; Con: Mare (3/3) 2', 2', 6'	Report	Try: Russell 4'; Con: Kratz (1/1) 4'

Estadio Municipal de La Pintana
Referee: Francisco López (United States)

==== Bronze medal match ====
4 November 2023
17:10

Canada	19–17	United States
Try: Richard 3'; Thier 1'; Russell 3'; Con: Kratz (2/3) 3', 3'	Report	Try: Thomas 5'; Williams 2'; Vi 6'; Con: Lacamp (1/3) 3'

Estadio Municipal de La Pintana
Referee: Cauã Santos (Brazil)

==== Gold medal match ====
4 November 2023
18:10

Argentina	24–5	Chile
Try: Lavayen (3) 1', 2', 6'; Osadczuk 3'; Con: Lavayen (2/3) 2', 6'	Report	Try: Bustamante 0'

Estadio Municipal de La Pintana
Referee: Francisco Gonzalez (Uruguay)

== Final ranking ==
Rank	Team
1st place, gold medalist(s)	Argentina
2nd place, silver medalist(s)	Chile
3rd place, bronze medalist(s)	Canada
4	United States
5	Uruguay
6	Brazil
7	Jamaica
8	Mexico

2023 Pan American Games winners

Argentina
2nd title
