= Kenya at the 2024 Summer Olympics =

- IOC code: KEN
- NOC: National Olympic Committee of Kenya
- Website: teamkenya.or.ke

in Paris, France 26 July 2024 – 11 August 2024
- Competitors: 75 (40 men and 34 women) in 6 sports
- Flag bearers (opening): Trizah Atuka & Ferdinand Omanyala
- Flag bearers (closing): Eliud Kipchoge & Faith Kipyegon
- Officials: Shadrack Maluki
- Medals Ranked 17th: Gold 4 Silver 2 Bronze 5 Total 11

Summer Olympics appearances (overview)
- 1956; 1960; 1964; 1968; 1972; 1976–1980; 1984; 1988; 1992; 1996; 2000; 2004; 2008; 2012; 2016; 2020; 2024

Kenya competed at the 2024 Summer Olympics in Paris from 26 July to 11 August 2024.

== Medalists ==
Medal	Name	Sport	Event	Date
Gold	Beatrice Chebet	Athletics	Women's 5000 m	5 August
Gold	Beatrice Chebet	Athletics	Women's 10000 m	9 August
Gold	Emmanuel Wanyonyi	Athletics	Men's 800 m	10 August
Gold	Faith Kipyegon	Athletics	Women's 1500 m	10 August
Silver	Faith Kipyegon	Athletics	Women's 5000 m	5 August
Silver	Ronald Kwemoi	Athletics	Men's 5000 m	10 August
Bronze	Mary Moraa	Athletics	Women's 800 m	5 August
Bronze	Faith Cherotich	Athletics	Women's 3000 m steeplechase	6 August
Bronze	Abraham Kibiwot	Athletics	Men's 3000 m steeplechase	7 August
Bronze	Benson Kipruto	Athletics	Men's marathon	10 August
Bronze	Hellen Obiri	Athletics	Women's marathon	11 August

Kipyegon was initially disqualified from the Women's 5000 m but got reinstated after an appeal.

== Competitors ==
The following is the list of number of competitors in the Games.

Sport	Men	Women	Total
Athletics	26	19	45
Fencing	0	1	1
Judo	0	1	1
Rugby sevens	13	0	13
Swimming	1	1	2
Volleyball	0	13	13
Total	40	34	75

== Athletics ==
Kenyan track and field athletes achieved the entry standards for Paris 2024, either by passing the direct qualifying mark (or time for track and road races) or by world ranking, in the following events (a maximum of 3 athletes each):

Key

- Note–Ranks given for track events are within the athlete's heat only
- Q = Qualified for the next round
- q = Qualified for the next round as a fastest loser or, in field events, by position without achieving the qualifying target
- R = Qualified for the repechage round
- NR = National record
- N/A = Round not applicable for the event
- Bye = Athlete not required to compete in round

Track and road events
Men

Athlete	Event	Heat		Repechage		Semifinal		Final	
Athlete	Event	Result	Rank	Result	Rank	Result	Rank	Result	Rank
Ferdinand Omanyala	100 m	10.08	1 Q	—		10.08	8	Did not advance	
Zablon Ekwam	400 m	Did not finish		Did not advance					
Emmanuel Wanyonyi	800 m	1:44.64	1 Q	Bye		1:43.32	1 Q	1:41.19 PB	1st place, gold medalist(s)
Wycliffe Kinyamal	800 m	1:45.86	3 Q	Bye		1:45.29	3	Did not advance	
Koitatoi Kidali	800 m	1:45.84	5 R	1:46.37	6	Did not advance			
Reynold Cheruiyot	1500 m	3:37.12	4 Q	Bye		3:35.32	10	Did not advance	
Brian Komen	1500 m	3:36.31	2 Q	Bye		3:32.57	4 Q	3:35.59	12
Timothy Cheruiyot	1500 m	3:35.39	5 Q	Bye		3:32.30	5 Q	3:31.35	11
Jacob Krop	5000 m	14:08.73	4 Q	—				13:18.68 SB	10
Edwin Kurgat	5000 m	14:08.76	5 Q	—				13:17.18	7
Ronald Kwemoi	5000 m	13:52.51	6 Q	—				13:15.04	2nd place, silver medalist(s)
Daniel Mateiko	10000 m	—						26:50.83	11
Nicholas Kipkorir	10000 m	—						27:23.97	14
Bernard Kibet	10000 m	—						26:43.98	5
Wiseman Mukhobe	400 m hurdles	48.58	5 q	Bye		49.22	5	Did not advance	
Amos Serem	3000 m steeplechase	8:18.41	6 qR	—				8:19.74	14
Simon Koech	3000 m steeplechase	8:24.95 (.942)	3 Q	—				8:09.87	7
Abraham Kibiwott	3000 m steeplechase	8:12.02	3 Q	—				8:06.47	3rd place, bronze medalist(s)
Eliud Kipchoge	Marathon	—						DNF	
Benson Kipruto	Marathon	—						2:07:00	3rd place, bronze medalist(s)
Alexander Mutiso Munyao	Marathon	—						2:10:31	21
Samuel Gathimba	20 km walk	—						1:21.26	22

Women

Athlete	Event	Heat		Repechage		Semifinal		Final	
Athlete	Event	Result	Rank	Result	Rank	Result	Rank	Result	Rank
Mary Moraa	800 m	1:57.95	2 Q	Bye		1:57.86	1 Q	1:57.42	3rd place, bronze medalist(s)
Vivian Chebet Kiprotich	800 m	1:59.90	5 R	1:59.31	2 q	1:59.64	8	Did not advance	
Lilian Odira	800 m	1:58.83 PB	3 Q	Bye		1:58.53	4	Did not advance	
Faith Kipyegon	1500 m	4:00.74	4 Q	Bye		3:58.64	1 Q	3:51.29 OR	1st place, gold medalist(s)
Nelly Chepchirchir	1500 m	4:02.67	1 Q	Bye		4:03.24	11	Did not advance	
Susan Ejore	1500 m	3:59.01	3 Q	Bye		3:56.57 PB	5 Q	3.56.07 PB	6
Faith Kipyegon	5000 m	14:57.56	1 Q	—				14:29.60	2nd place, silver medalist(s)
Beatrice Chebet	5000 m	15:00.73	1 Q	—				14:28.56	1st place, gold medalist(s)
Margaret Kipkemboi	5000 m	14:57.70	4 Q	—				14:32.23	5
Lilian Kisait	10000 m	—						30:45.04	5
Margaret Kipkemboi	10000 m	—						30:44.58	4
Beatrice Chebet	10000 m	—						30:43.25	1st place, gold medalist(s)
Faith Cherotich	3000 m steeplechase	9:10.57	2 Q	—				8:55.15 PB	3rd place, bronze medalist(s)
Beatrice Chepkoech	3000 m steeplechase	9:13.56	1 Q	—				9:04.24	6
Jackline Chepkoech	3000 m steeplechase	9:35.56	12	—				Did not advance	
Peres Jepchirchir	Marathon	—						2:26:51	15
Sharon Lokedi	Marathon	—						2:23:14 PB	4
Hellen Obiri	Marathon	—						2:23:10 PB	3rd place, bronze medalist(s)

Mixed

Athlete	Event	Heat		Final	
Athlete	Event	Time	Rank	Time	Rank
David Sanayek Kapirante; Boniface Ontuga Mweresa; Kelvin Sane Tauta; Mercy Chebet; Veronica Kamumbe Mutua; Maureen Nyatichi Thomas	4 × 400 m relay	3:13.13	12	Did not advance	

Field events

Athlete	Event	Qualification		Final	
Athlete	Event	Distance	Position	Distance	Position
Julius Yego	Men's javelin throw	85.97 SB	5 Q	87.72 SB	5

== Fencing ==
Kenya entered one fencer into the Olympic competition, marking the country's debut in the sport. Alexandra Ndolo secured her quota places in women's épée events, after nominated as the highest ranked individual fencer, eligible for African zone through the release of the FIE Official ranking for Paris 2024.

Athlete	Event	Round of 64	Round of 32	Round of 16	Quarterfinal	Semifinal	Final / BM	
Athlete	Event	Opposition Score	Opposition Score	Opposition Score	Opposition Score	Opposition Score	Opposition Score	Rank
Alexandra Ndolo	Women's épée	Bye	Kryvytska (UKR); L 12–13	Did not advance				

== Judo ==
Kenya qualified one judoka for the following weight class at the Games. Zeddy Cherotich (women's heavyweight, 78 kg) got qualified via continental quota based on Olympic point rankings.

Athlete	Event	Round of 32	Round of 16	Quarterfinals	Semifinals	Repechage	Final / BM	
Athlete	Event	Opposition Result	Opposition Result	Opposition Result	Opposition Result	Opposition Result	Opposition Result	Rank
Zeddy Cherotich	Women's –78 kg	Sampaio (POR); L 00–10	Did not advance					

== Rugby sevens ==
Summary

Team	Event	Pool round				Classification	Classification	
Team	Event	Opposition Result	Opposition Result	Opposition Result	Rank	Opposition Result	Opposition Result	Rank
Kenya men's	Men's tournament	Argentina; L 12–31	Australia; L 7–21	Samoa; L 0–26	4	Uruguay; W 19–14	Samoa; W 10–5	9

=== Men's tournament ===
Kenya national rugby sevens team qualified for the Olympics by winning the gold medal and secured the only available spots through the 2023 Africa Men's Sevens in Harare, Zimbabwe.

Team roster

Kenya's squad of 12 players was named on 2 July 2024. Additionally, Festus Shiasi and Denis Abukuse were named as traveling reserves.

Head coach: Kevin Wambua

No.	Player	Date of birth (age)
1	John Okoth	28 April 2000 (aged 24)
2	Lamec Ambetsa	27 January 2000 (aged 24)
3	George Ooro	3 March 2000 (aged 24)
4	Vincent Onyala	10 December 1996 (aged 27)
5	Brian Tanga	19 September 1995 (aged 28)
6	Kevin Wekesa	7 August 2000 (aged 23)
7	Tony Omondi (c)	26 March 1995 (aged 29)
8	Herman Humwa	8 November 1995 (aged 28)
9	Samuel Asati	14 March 1999 (aged 25)
10	Nygel Amaitsa	26 May 2002 (aged 22)
11	Patrick Odongo	20 March 2002 (aged 22)
12	Chrisant Ojwang	15 December 1998 (aged 25)

Group stage

Pos	Team	Pld	W	D	L	PF	PA	PD	Pts	Qualification
1	Australia	3	3	0	0	64	35	+29	9	Advance to Quarter-finals
2	Argentina	3	2	0	1	73	46	+27	7	Advance to Quarter-finals
3	Samoa	3	1	0	2	52	49	+3	5	
4	Kenya	3	0	0	3	19	78	−59	3	

Source: World Rugby
Rules for classification: 1) Points; 2) Head-to-head result; 3) Point difference; 4) Points scored.

24 July 2024
16:00

Argentina	31–12	Kenya
Try: Fraga (2) 7' m, 8' c Elizalde 10' c González 14' c Moneta 15' m Con: Pellandini (2/3) 8', 12'; Mare (1/1) 14'	World Rugby	Try: Ojwang 4' c Wekesa 9' m Con: Mboya (1/2) 5'

Stade de France, Paris
Attendance: 69,000
Referee: AJ Jacobs (South Africa)

24 July 2024
19:00

Australia	21–7	Kenya
Try: Turner 1' c Lawson 6' c Toole 13' c Con: Roache (3/3) 1', 7', 13'	World Rugby	Try: Mboya 3' c Con: Mboya (1/1) 3'

Stade de France, Paris
Attendance: 69,000
Referee: Paulo Duarte (Portugal)

25 July 2024
14:00

Samoa	26–0	Kenya
Try: Opetai 3' m Scanlan 8' c Apelu Maliko 14' c Onosai 16' c Con: Falaniko (1/2) 9'; Maiava (1/1) 14'; Leitufia (1/1) 17'	World Rugby

Stade de France, Paris
Attendance: 70,000
Referee: Reuben Keane (Australia)

9–12th place playoff semi-final

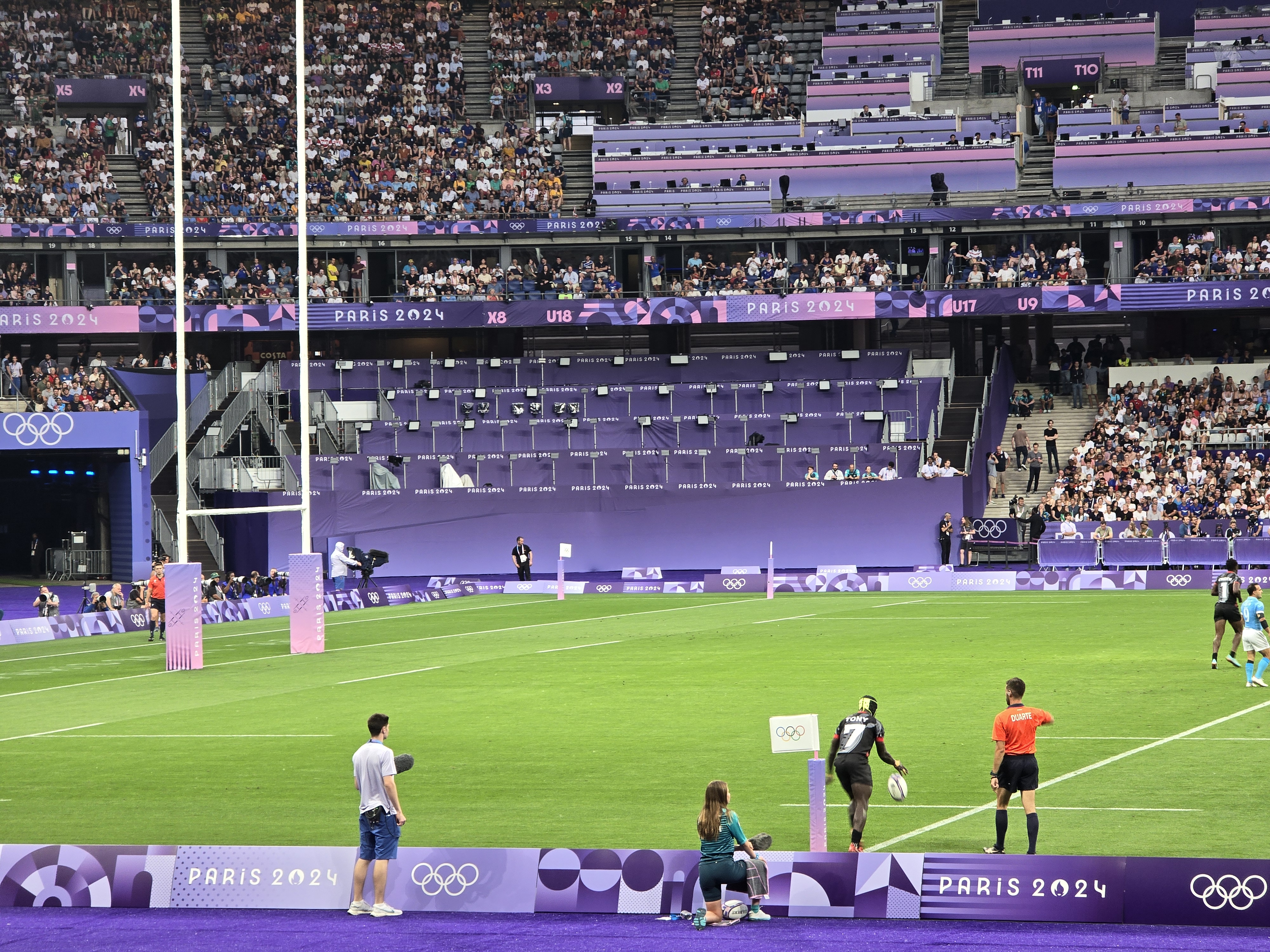
Kenya conversion against Uruguay

25 July 2024
20:30

Uruguay	14–19	Kenya
Try: Tafernaberry 1' c Amaya 16' c Con: Tafernaberry (1/1) 1'; Lijtenstein (1/1) 16'	World Rugby	Try: Okoth 10' c Asati 12' c Okong'o 18'; Con: Mboya (2/2) 11', 12'

Stade de France, Paris
Attendance: 70,000
Referee: Paulo Duarte (Portugal)

Ninth place match

27 July 2024
17:00

Samoa	5–10	Kenya
Try: Opetai 11' m	World Rugby	Try: Okeyo (2) 3' m, 8' m

Stade de France, Paris
Referee: Tevita Rokovereni (Fiji)

== Swimming ==
Kenya sent two swimmers to compete at the 2024 Paris Olympics.

Athlete	Event	Heat		Semifinal		Final	
Athlete	Event	Time	Rank	Time	Rank	Time	Rank
Ridhwan Abubakar	Men's 400 m freestyle	4:05.14	36	—		Did not advance	
Maria Brunlehner	Women's 50 m freestyle	25.82	27	Did not advance			

== Volleyball ==
=== Indoor ===
Summary

Team	Event	Group stage				Quarterfinal	Semifinal	Final / BM	
Team	Event	Opposition Score	Opposition Score	Opposition Score	Rank	Opposition Score	Opposition Score	Opposition Score	Rank
Kenya women's	Women's tournament	Brazil; L 0–3	Poland; L 0–3	Japan; L 0–3	4	Did not advance			12

==== Women's tournament ====
Kenya's women's volleyball team qualified for the Olympics by finishing as the top-ranked African nation in the June 2024 edition of the FIVB World Rankings.

Team roster

The roster was announced on 9 July 2024.

Head coach: Japheth Munala

- 1 Esther Mutinda S
- 2 Veronica Oluoch OH
- 3 Pamella Owino OP
- 4 Leonida Kasaya OH
- 6 Belinda Barasa MB
- 7 Emmaculate Misoki S
- 8 Trizah Atuka (c) MB
- 11 Loise Simiyu OP
- 13 Juliana Namutira OH
- 15 Lorine Kaei MB
- 16 Agripina Kundu L
- 19 Edith Mukuvilani MB

Group play

Pos	Team	Pld	W	L	Pts	SW	SL	SR	SPW	SPL	SPR	Qualification
1	Brazil	3	3	0	9	9	0	MAX	238	165	1.442	Quarter-finals
2	Poland	3	2	1	6	6	4	1.500	244	230	1.061	Quarter-finals
3	Japan	3	1	2	3	4	6	0.667	226	224	1.009	
4	Kenya	3	0	3	0	0	9	0.000	136	225	0.604	

Source: Olympics
Rules for classification: Tiebreakers

29 July 2024; 13:00	Brazil	3–0	Kenya	South Paris Arena 1, Paris; Attendance: 9,275; Referees: Wang Ziling (CHN), Juraj Mokrý (SVK)
29 July 2024; 13:00	(25–14, 25–13, 25–12); P2 Report			South Paris Arena 1, Paris; Attendance: 9,275; Referees: Wang Ziling (CHN), Juraj Mokrý (SVK)

31 July 2024; 21:00	Poland	3–0	Kenya	South Paris Arena 1, Paris; Attendance: 9,447; Referees: Angela Grass (BRA), Wael Kandil (EGY)
31 July 2024; 21:00	(25–14, 25–17, 25–15); P2 Report			South Paris Arena 1, Paris; Attendance: 9,447; Referees: Angela Grass (BRA), Wael Kandil (EGY)

3 August 2024; 13:00	Japan	3–0	Kenya	South Paris Arena 1, Paris; Attendance: 9,439; Referees: Hamid Al-Rousi (UAE), Angela Grass (BRA)
3 August 2024; 13:00	(25–17, 25–22, 25–12); P2 Report			South Paris Arena 1, Paris; Attendance: 9,439; Referees: Hamid Al-Rousi (UAE), Angela Grass (BRA)
