= 2023–24 SVNS =

Series of national rugby sevens tournaments

- Men's Series XXV; Women's Series XI
- Hosts: United Arab Emirates; South Africa; Australia; United States; Canada; Hong Kong; Singapore; Spain (Grand Final)
- Date: 2 December 2023 – 2 June 2024
- Nations: 12

Team changes
- Relegated: Men; Samoa; Canada; Women; South Africa

Series details
- Top try scorer: Men; Terry Kennedy (32); Women; Maddison Levi (69)
- Top point scorer: Men; Terry Kennedy (160); Women; Maddison Levi (345)

The 2023–24 SVNS was the 25th annual series of rugby sevens tournaments for national sevens teams, known as the World Rugby Sevens Series (SVNS). It was played between December 2023 and June 2024. The Sevens Series has been run by World Rugby since 1999.

The men's and women's tournaments were played as side-by-side events at the same destinations for the entire series, making 2023–24 the first fully combined season. The series began in Dubai and travelled across the world to Cape Town, Perth, Vancouver, Los Angeles, Hong Kong and Singapore before concluding in Madrid.

== Teams and format ==
The number of men's teams was reduced from sixteen to twelve for the 2023–24 series, matching the number of women's teams. Canada was included as the twelfth men's team after winning the play-off in London on 21 May 2023. South Africa gained promotion as the twelfth women's team by winning the Challenger Series.

=== Men's teams ===
- Argentina
- Australia
- Canada
- Fiji
- France
- Great Britain
- Ireland
- New Zealand
- Samoa
- South Africa
- Spain
- United States

=== Women's teams ===
- Australia
- Brazil
- Canada
- Fiji
- France
- (United Kingdom) Great Britain
- Ireland
- Japan
- New Zealand
- South Africa
- Spain
- United States

The series took place over seven months and included eight events, with the final event holding the top eight-placed teams in a Grand Final event. The teams placed between nine–twelve will compete in a promotion/relegation-style event with other teams to decide which stay as core teams.

== Format ==
For the first time ever, aligning to the Olympic model, the new SVNS format will showcase the twelve best men's and women's teams, which will conclude in a Grand Final weekend where the top eight teams will compete to be crowned Series champions. The teams ranked ninth to twelfth will compete against the top four teams from a new Challenger Series in a relegation play-off to see who secures their place in the 2024–2025 season. It will also be the first time both men and women's teams will earn the same with equal participation fees. The tournament will be a build up to the Paris 2024 Olympic Games.

== Tour venues ==
The schedule for the series is:

2023–24 itinerary
Leg	Stadium	City	Dates	Men's Winner	Women's Winner
Dubai	The Sevens	Dubai	2–3 December 2023	South Africa	Australia
South Africa	DHL Stadium	Cape Town	9–10 December 2023	Argentina	Australia
Australia	HBF Park	Perth	26–28 January 2024	Argentina	Ireland
Canada	BC Place	Vancouver	23–25 February 2024	Argentina	New Zealand
United States	Dignity Health Sports Park	Los Angeles	1–3 March 2024	France	New Zealand
Hong Kong	Hong Kong Stadium	Hong Kong	5–7 April 2024	New Zealand	New Zealand
Singapore	National Stadium	Singapore	3–5 May 2024	New Zealand	New Zealand
Spain	Metropolitano Stadium	Madrid	31 May – 2 June 2024	France	Australia

== Standings ==
The points awarded to teams at each event, as well as the overall season totals, are shown in the table below. Gold indicates the event champions. Silver indicates the event runner-ups. Bronze indicates the event third place finishers. An asterisk (*) indicates a tied placing. A dash (—) is recorded where a team did not compete. The delineation between position eight and position nine denotes the teams (1st–8th) that will compete in the grand final in Madrid, and the teams (9th–12th) that will compete in the Challenger Series.

=== Men's ===
2023–24 SVNS – Men's Series XXV
Pos.	Event Team	Dubai	Cape Town	Perth	Vancouver	Los Angeles	Hong Kong	Singapore	Points total
1	Argentina	18	20	20	20	12	4	12	106
2	Ireland	12	14	16	12	16	16	18	104
3	New Zealand	16	12	4	18	3	20	20	93
4	Australia	8	18	18	3	8	14	14	83
5	France	4	6	10	16	20	18	6	80
6	Fiji	14	16	14	10	10	12	4	80
7	South Africa	20	10	12	4	2	10	10	68
8	Great Britain	3	4	2	8	18	2	16	53
9	United States	6	2	8	14	6	8	8	52
10	Spain	2	3	6	2	14	6	3	36
11	Samoa	10	1	3	6	4	3	2	29
12	Canada	1	8	1	1	1	1	1	14

Legend
No colour	Core team and re-qualified as a core team for the 2024–25 World Sevens Series
Pink	Relegated from core team status for 2024–25 after Grand Finals

=== Women's ===
2023–24 SVNS – Women's Series XI
Pos.	Event Team	Dubai	Cape Town	Perth	Vancouver	Los Angeles	Hong Kong	Singapore	Points total
1	New Zealand	18	16	12	20	20	20	20	126
2	Australia	20	20	18	14	18	16	18	124
3	France	16	18	10	18	12	14	16	104
4	United States	8	14	14	12	16	18	3	85
5	Canada	14	10	8	16	14	10	8	80
6	Fiji	12	12	6	10	2	12	14	68
7	Ireland	10	8	20	4	6	6	12	66
8	(United Kingdom) Great Britain	2	6	16	2	3	4	6	39
9	Japan	4	3	2	3	4	8	10	34
10	Brazil	6	4	4	6	8	3	1	32
11	South Africa	3	1	3	1	10	1	4	23
12	Spain	1	2	1	8	1	2	2	17

Legend
No colour	Core team and re-qualified as a core team for the 2024–25 Woman's World Sevens Series
Pink	Relegated from core team status for 2024–25 after Grand Finals

=== Men's Grand Finals ===
2023–24 SVNS – Men's Series XXV
Pos.	Event Team	Madrid
1st place, gold medalist(s)	France	
2nd place, silver medalist(s)	Argentina	
3rd place, bronze medalist(s)	Fiji	
4	New Zealand	
5	Ireland	
6	South Africa	
7	Australia	
8	Great Britain	

=== Women's Grand Finals ===
2023–24 SVNS – Women's Series XI
Pos.	Event Team	Madrid
1st place, gold medalist(s)	Australia	
2nd place, silver medalist(s)	France	
3rd place, bronze medalist(s)	New Zealand	
4	Canada	
5	United States	
6	Ireland	
7	Fiji	
8	(United Kingdom) Great Britain	

== Placings summary ==
Tallies of top-four placings in tournaments during the 2023–24 series, by team:

=== Men ===
Team	(gold) Gold	(silver) Silver	(bronze) Bronze	Fourth	Total
Argentina	3	2	—	—	5
New Zealand	2	1	1	1	5
France	2	1	1	—	4
South Africa	1	—	—	—	1
Australia	—	2	—	2	4
Ireland	—	1	3	1	5
Great Britain	—	1	1	—	2
Fiji	—	—	2	2	4
United States	—	—	—	1	1
Spain	—	—	—	1	1

=== Women ===
Team	(gold) Gold	(silver) Silver	(bronze) Bronze	Fourth	Total
New Zealand	4	1	2	—	7
Australia	3	3	1	1	8
Ireland	1	—	—	—	1
France	—	3	2	1	6
United States	—	1	1	2	4
Canada	—	—	1	3	4
Great Britain	—	—	1	—	1
Fiji	—	—	—	1	1

== Players ==
Player of the final award
Tour Leg	Men's Winner	Women's Winner	Ref.
Dubai	Selvyn Davids	Teagan Levi	
Cape Town	Matías Osadczuk	Madison Ashby	
Perth	Marcos Moneta	Lucy Mulhall	
Vancouver	Luciano González	Portia Woodman	
Los Angeles	Stephen Parez	Risi Pouri-Lane	
Hong Kong	Dylan Collier	Michaela Blyde	
Singapore	Dylan Collier	Jorja Miller	
Madrid	Stephen Parez	Maddison Levi	

=== Scoring ===
==== Men ====
Tries scored
Rank	Player	Tries
1	Terry Kennedy	32
2	Perry Baker	30
3	Marcos Moneta	29
4	Nathan Lawson	25
4	Zac Ward	25

Points scored
Rank	Player	Points
1	Terry Kennedy	160
2	Perry Baker	150
2	Dietrich Roache	150
4	Marcos Moneta	145
5	Terio Veilawa	144

Goals scored
Rank	Player	Points
1	Stephen Tomasin	44
2	Dietrich Roache	40
3	Joaquín Pellandini	39
4	Tobias Wade	36
5	Tom Emery	34

Updated: 13 August 2024

==== Women ====
Tries scored
Rank	Player	Tries
1	Maddison Levi	69
2	Michaela Blyde	53
3	Faith Nathan	38
4	Amee-Leigh Murphy Crowe	33
4	Anne-Cécile Ciofani	33

Points scored
Rank	Player	Points
1	Maddison Levi	345
2	Michaela Blyde	267
3	Faith Nathan	190
4	Teagan Levi	179
5	Nadine Roos	178

Goals scored
Rank	Player	Points
1	Tyla King	73
2	Teagan Levi	62
3	Chloe Daniels	48
4	Tia Hinds	44
5	Caroline Drouin	43

Updated: 13 August 2024

=== Awards ===
Rookie of the Year Award
Men's Winner	Women's Winner	Ref.
Antoine Dupont	Carissa Norsten	

Player of the Year Award
Men's Winner	Women's Winner	Ref.
Antoine Dupont	Maddison Levi	

Dream Team
Men's Dream Team	Women's Dream Team	Ref.
Antoine Dupont; Aaron Grandidier-Nkanang; Selvyn Davids; Terry Kennedy; Nathan Lawson; Ponepati Loganimasi; Matías Osadczuk	Olivia Apps; Michaela Blyde; Kristi Kirshe; Maddison Levi; Ilona Maher; Jorja Miller; Séraphine Okemba	

== Tournaments ==
=== Dubai ===
==== Men ====
Event	Winner	Score	Finalist
Cup	South Africa	12–7	Argentina
Bronze	New Zealand	17–12	Fiji
Fifth Place	Ireland	28–7	Samoa
Seventh Place	Australia	26–12	United States
Ninth Place	France	22–0	Great Britain
Eleventh Place	Spain	19–14	Canada

==== Women ====
Event	Winner	Score	Finalist
Cup	Australia	26–19	New Zealand
Bronze	France	26–5	Canada
Fifth Place	Fiji	24–19	Ireland
Seventh Place	United States	38–7	Brazil
Ninth place	Japan	12–5	South Africa
Eleventh Place	Great Britain	26–12	Spain

=== Cape Town ===
==== Men ====
Event	Winner	Score	Finalist
Cup	Argentina	45–12	Australia
Bronze	Fiji	14–7	Ireland
Fifth Place	New Zealand	31–7	South Africa
Seventh Place	Canada	33–17	France
Ninth Place	Great Britain	31–7	Spain
Eleventh Place	United States	24–19	Samoa

==== Women ====
Event	Winner	Score	Finalist
Cup	Australia	29–26	France
Bronze	New Zealand	19–7	United States
Fifth Place	Fiji	19–17	Canada
Seventh Place	Ireland	17–5	Great Britain
Ninth Place	Brazil	15–14	Japan
Eleventh Place	Spain	21–7	South Africa

=== Perth ===
==== Men ====
Event	Winner	Score	Finalist
Cup	Argentina	31–5	Australia
Bronze	Ireland	24–7	Fiji
Fifth Place	South Africa	24–5	France
Seventh Place	United States	27–12	Spain
Ninth Place	New Zealand	21–14	Samoa
Eleventh Place	Great Britain	17–5	Canada

==== Women ====
Event	Winner	Score	Finalist
Cup	Ireland	19–14	Australia
Bronze	Great Britain	24–10	United States
Fifth Place	New Zealand	14–10	France
Seventh Place	Canada	26–5	Fiji
Ninth Place	Brazil	7–0	South Africa
Eleventh Place	Japan	33–5	Spain

=== Vancouver ===
==== Men ====
Event	Winner	Score	Finalist
Cup	Argentina	36–12	New Zealand
Bronze	France	42–12	United States
Fifth Place	Ireland	24–19	Fiji
Seventh Place	Great Britain	19–14	Samoa
Ninth Place	South Africa	24–7	Australia
Eleventh Place	Spain	17–12	Canada

==== Women ====
Event	Winner	Score	Finalist
Cup	New Zealand	35–19	France
Bronze	Canada	19–14	Australia
Fifth Place	United States	29–7	Fiji
Seventh Place	Spain	15–12	Brazil
Ninth Place	Ireland	12–7	Japan
Eleventh Place	Great Britain	12–5	South Africa

=== Los Angeles ===
==== Men ====
Event	Winner	Score	Finalist
Cup	France	21–0	Great Britain
Bronze	Ireland	24–7	Spain
Fifth Place	Argentina	26–21	Fiji
Seventh Place	Australia	24–14	United States
Ninth place	Samoa	12–5	New Zealand
Eleventh Place	South Africa	28–15	Canada

==== Women ====
Event	Winner	Score	Finalist
Cup	New Zealand	29–14	Australia
Bronze	United States	21–7	Canada
Fifth Place	France	55–0	South Africa
Seventh Place	Brazil	28–14	Ireland
Ninth Place	Japan	24–19	Great Britain
Eleventh Place	Fiji	40–7	Spain

=== Hong Kong ===
==== Men ====
Event	Winner	Score	Finalist
Cup	New Zealand	10–7	France
Bronze	Ireland	14–5	Australia
Fifth Place	Fiji	33–14	South Africa
Seventh Place	United States	19–17	Spain
Ninth Place	Argentina	42–0	Samoa
Eleventh Place	Great Britain	26–17	Canada

==== Women ====
Event	Winner	Score	Finalist
Cup	New Zealand	36–7	United States
Bronze	Australia	24–21	France
Fifth Place	Fiji	19–15	Canada
Seventh Place	Japan	12–5	Ireland
Ninth Place	Great Britain	14–5	Brazil
Eleventh Place	Spain	17–14	South Africa

=== Singapore ===
==== Men ====
Event	Winner	Score	Finalist
Cup	New Zealand	17–14	Ireland
Bronze	Great Britain	26–7	Australia
BronzePlace	Argentina	14–10	South Africa
Seventh Place	United States	19–17	France
Ninth Place	Fiji	21–12	Spain
Eleventh Place	Samoa	17–12	Canada

==== Women ====
Event	Winner	Score	Finalist
Cup	New Zealand	31–21	Australia
Bronze	France	29–7	Fiji
Fifth Place	Ireland	19–17	Japan
Seventh Place	Canada	17–5	Great Britain
Ninth Place	South Africa	5–0	United States
Eleventh Place	Spain	24–19	Brazil

=== Madrid ===
==== Men ====
Event	Winners	Score	Finalists
Championship	France	19–5	Argentina
Bronze	Fiji	17–10	New Zealand
Fifth Place	Ireland	12–7	South Africa
Seventh Place	Australia	21–0	Great Britain
Qualifier Playoffs	United States	40–19	Samoa
Qualifier Playoffs	Kenya	33–15	Germany
Qualifier Playoffs	Uruguay	12–10	Chile
Qualifier Playoffs	Spain	22–14	Canada

==== Women ====
Event	Winners	Score	Finalists
Championship	Australia	26–7	France
Bronze	New Zealand	26–14	Canada
Fifth Place	United States	27–14	Ireland
Seventh Place	Fiji	42–7	Great Britain
Qualifier Playoffs	China	33–0	Belgium
Qualifier Playoffs	Spain	22–0	South Africa
Qualifier Playoffs	Japan	26–12	Argentina
Qualifier Playoffs	Brazil	38–7	Poland

== See also ==
- 2024 World Rugby Sevens Challenger Series – Men's tour
- 2024 World Rugby Sevens Challenger Series – Women's tour
