= Rugby sevens at the 2026 South American Games =

Rugby sevens competitions at the 2026 South American Games

- Venue: Hipodromo Ovalo
- Dates: September 18–20
- Nations: 7
- Teams: 13 (6 men and 7 women)

Medalists
gold medal	Argentina (men)
gold medal	Argentina (women)
silver medal	Chile (men)
silver medal	Colombia (women)
bronze medal	Uruguay (men)
bronze medal	Paraguay (women)

Rugby sevens tournaments at the 2026 South American Games in Rosario, Santa Fe, and Rafaela, Argentina, were held between September 18 and 20 at Hipodromo Ovalo, located within Parque de la Independencia in Rosario.

Two medal events were contested: a men's and women's tournament. The top two teams in each tournament qualified for the 2027 Pan American Games rugby sevens competitions, excluding host country Peru in both tournaments, as well as Argentina and Brazil, who have already qualified by winning the men's and women's tournaments at the 2025 Junior Pan American Games, respectively.

Argentina and Brazil are the defending champions of the South American Games men's and women's rugby sevens events.

== Participating nations ==
A total of 7 ODESUR nations registered teams for the rugby sevens events. Each nation was able to enter a maximum of 24 athletes (one team of 12 players per gender). All 7 nations will participate in both tournaments except Brazil, who will only appear in the men's.

- Argentina (24 players)
- Brazil (12)
- Chile (24)
- Colombia (24)
- Paraguay (24)
- Peru (24)
- Uruguay (24)

== Medal summary ==
=== Medal table ===
* Host nation (Argentina)

Rank	Nation	Gold	Silver	Bronze	Total
1	Argentina*	2	0	0	2
2	Chile	0	1	0	1
2	Colombia	0	1	0	1
4	Paraguay	0	0	1	1
4	Uruguay	0	0	1	1
Totals (5 entries)		2	2	2	6

=== Medalists ===
Event	Gold	Silver	Bronze
Men's tournament	Argentina; Juan Batac; Mateo Fossati; Santiago Vera; Santiago Álvarez; Martiniano Arieta; Sebastián Dubac; Matteo Graziano; Gregorio Pérez; Santino Zangara; Pedro de Haro; Santiago Mare; Marcos Moneta	Chile; Rodrigo Araya; Sebastián Bianchi; Manuel Bustamante; Álvaro Castro; Martín Escobar; Joaquín Huici; Gonzalo Lara; Vicente López; Nicolás Saab; Luca Strabucchi; Ernesto Tchimino; Julián Troncoso	Uruguay; Ignacio Facciolo; Joaqupin Fresnedo; Pedro Hoblog; Francisco Landauer; Bautista Menchaca; Manuel Parodi; Iván Peters; Nicolás Pittaluga; Bruno Primavesi; Ignacio Rodríguez; Joaquín Suárez; Alfnso Vidal
Women's tournament	Argentina; Candela Delgado; Antonela Reding; Francesca Iacaruso; Yamila González; María Taladrid; Abril Romero; Mariel Velay; Brisa Borda; Paula Paulino; Cristal Escalante; Sofía González; Talia Rodich	Colombia; Angie Manyoma; Carol Carmona; Daniela Alzate; Eva Pino; Isabella Henry; Jehiliana Ríos; Jocelín Ruco; Karen Jiménez; Laura Mejía; Leidy Soto; Madi Córdoba; Valentina Tapias	Paraguay; Analia Figueredo; Ingrid Alfonso; Lucero Viveros; Liz Romero; Chiara Báez; Natalia Méndez; Isabel Colman; María Gauto; Sofía Armoa; Miriam Ramos; Perla Roa; Jacqueline Velaztiqui

== Results ==
=== Men's tournament ===
Standings

Pos	Team	Pld	W	D	L	PF	PA	PD	Pts	Qualification
1	Argentina	6	5	1	0	232	26	+206	17	Gold medal match
2	Chile	6	5	0	1	136	88	+48	16	Gold medal match
3	Uruguay	6	3	1	2	121	69	+52	13	Bronze medal match
4	Colombia	6	3	1	2	98	72	+26	13	Bronze medal match
5	Paraguay	6	1	1	4	46	117	−71	9	
6	Brazil	6	1	1	4	60	114	−54	9	
7	Peru	6	0	1	5	22	229	−207	7	

Source: Santa Fe 2026
Rules for classification: 1) Points; 2) Head-to-head result; 3) Points difference; 4) Tries difference; 5) Points scored; 6) Tries scored; 7) Fewest red cards received; 8) Fewest yellow cards received; 9) Drawing of lots.

Final stage

Bronze medal match
September 21
Uruguay	22
Colombia	0

Gold medal match
September 21
Argentina	17
Chile	7

Final ranking

Rank	Team
1st place, gold medalist(s)	Argentina
2nd place, silver medalist(s)	Chile
3rd place, bronze medalist(s)	Uruguay
4	Colombia
5	Brazil
6	Paraguay
7	Peru

=== Women's tournament ===
Standings

Pos	Team	Pld	W	D	L	PF	PA	PD	Pts	Qualification
1	Argentina	5	4	1	0	158	5	+153	14	Gold medal match
2	Colombia	5	3	1	1	86	31	+55	12	Gold medal match
3	Paraguay	5	2	1	2	43	89	−46	10	Bronze medal match
4	Uruguay	5	2	1	2	45	74	−29	10	Bronze medal match
5	Chile	5	1	1	3	36	73	−37	8	
6	Peru	5	0	1	4	17	113	−96	6	

Source: Santa Fe 2026
Rules for classification: 1) Points; 2) Head-to-head result; 3) Points difference; 4) Tries difference; 5) Points scored; 6) Tries scored; 7) Fewest red cards received; 8) Fewest yellow cards received; 9) Drawing of lots.

Final stage

Bronze medal match
September 21
Paraguay	22
Uruguay	12

Gold medal match
September 21
Argentina	33
Colombia	5

Final ranking

Rank	Team
1st place, gold medalist(s)	Argentina
2nd place, silver medalist(s)	Colombia
3rd place, bronze medalist(s)	Paraguay
4	Uruguay
5	Chile
6	Peru
