= Rugby sevens at the 2022 South American Games – Men's tournament =

2020 South American Games men's rugby sevens tournament
Tournament details
- Host: Paraguay
- Venue: Estadio Héroes de Curupayty, Asunción
- Date: 7–9 October 2022
- Teams: 7

Final positions
- Champions: Argentina (2nd title)
- Runner-up: Chile
- Third place: Uruguay
- Fourth place: Brazil

Tournament statistics
- Matches played: 24
- Tries scored: 135 (5.63 per match)

The men's tournament of the rugby sevens at the 2022 South American Games was held from 7 to 9 October 2022 at the Estadio Héroes de Curupayty in Luque, Paraguay, a sub-venue outside Asunción. It was the third edition of the rugby sevens men's tournament at the South American Games since its first appearance in Santiago 2014.

The tournament served as qualifier for the 2023 Pan American Games, with the top two teams (excluding Chile) qualifying to the men's rugby sevens tournament.

Argentina won the gold medal and their second South American Games men's rugby sevens title after beating the defending champions Chile 19–7 in the final. Uruguay beat Brazil with a 19–12 score to win the bronze medal.

Argentina and Uruguay qualified for the 2023 Pan American Games as the Sudamérica Rugby representatives, besides Chile which qualified automatically as hosts.

== Schedule ==
The tournament was held over a 3-day period, from 7 to 9 October.

PR	Preliminary round	PM	Placement match	B	Bronze medal match	F	Gold medal match

Fri 7		Sat 8		Sun 9			
Morning	Evening	Morning	Evening	Morning	Evening		
PR	PR	PR	PR	PR	PM	B	F
4 M	6 M	4 M	6 M	1 M	1 M	2 M	

== Teams ==
A total of nine ODESUR NOCs entered teams for the men's tournament.

Teams	App	Previous best performance
Argentina	3rd	Gold medal (2014)
Brazil	3rd	Fourth place (2014, 2018)
Chile	3rd	Gold medal (2018)
Colombia	3rd	Fifth place (2014, 2018)
Paraguay	3rd	Sixth place (2014, 2018)
Peru	2nd	Seventh place (2014)
Uruguay	3rd	Silver medal (2014, 2018)

=== Rosters ===
Each participating NOC had to enter a roster of 12 players (Technical manual Article 9).

== Venue ==
All matches were played at the Estadio Héroes de Curupayty located within the Parque Olímpico cluster in Luque, Paraguay and owned by the Paraguayan Olympic Committee. The Estadio Héroes de Curupayty, which was remodeled in 2020, has a capacity for 3,000 spectators.

== Results ==
All match times are in PYST (UTC−3).

=== Preliminary round ===
The preliminary round consisted of a single group of 7 teams in which each team played once against the other 6 teams in the group on a round-robin format. The fifth and sixth placed teams advanced to play for the fifth place, the third and fourth placed teams advanced to the bronze medal match and the first and second placed teams advanced to the gold medal match.

==== Standings ====
Pos	Team	Pld	W	D	L	PF	PA	PD	Pts	Qualification
1	Argentina	6	6	0	0	233	29	+204	18	Gold medal match
2	Chile	6	5	0	1	141	61	+80	16	Gold medal match
3	Uruguay	6	4	0	2	156	74	+82	14	Bronze medal match
4	Brazil	6	3	0	3	89	74	+15	12	Bronze medal match
5	Colombia	6	2	0	4	72	134	−62	10	Fifth place match
6	Paraguay	6	1	0	5	55	141	−86	8	Fifth place match
7	Peru	6	0	0	6	12	245	−233	6	7th place

Source: ASU2022
Rules for classification: 1) Points; 2) Head-to-head result; 3) Points difference; 4) Tries difference; 5) Points scored; 6) Tries scored; 7) Fewest red cards received; 8) Fewest yellow cards received; 9) Drawing of lots.

==== Matches ====
7 October 2022
9:00

Chile	19–12	Uruguay
Try: Huici (2) 3' c, 13' m Warnken 12' c Con: Warnken 3', 12'	Report	Try: Brazionis 1' m Lijtenstein 5' c Con: Viñals 5'

Estadio Héroes de Curupayty, Asunción

7 October 2022
9:22

Brazil	10–31	Argentina
Try: Romeu 4' m Da Silva 8' m	Report	Try: Moneta (2) 2' c, 5' m Wade 9' c Lizazú 12' m D'Agostino 13' c Con: Wade 2', 9', 14'

Estadio Héroes de Curupayty, Asunción

7 October 2022
9:44

Peru	0–45	Colombia
	Report	Try: Ceballos 4' c Navarro (2) 6' m, 10' c Guisao (2) 8' c, 9' m Urrutia (2) 11' c, 14' c Con: Urrutia 4', 8'; Ortiz 10', 12', 14'

Estadio Héroes de Curupayty, Asunción

7 October 2022
11:12

Chile	24–7	Paraguay
Try: Urbina 1T m Huici 4' m Videla 6' c Game 12' c Con: Alvarado 6'; Warnken 12'	Report	Try: Sotelo 8' c Con: Mussi (1/1) 8'

Estadio Héroes de Curupayty, Asunción

7 October 2022
16:30

Colombia	27–12	Paraguay
Try: Agudelo (2) 1' m, 11' m García 8' c Urrutia 11' m Ceballos 13' m Con: Urrutia 8'	Report	Try: Chilavert 4' m Berdejo 14' c Con: Urbieta 14'

Estadio Héroes de Curupayty, Asunción

7 October 2022
16:52

Argentina	50–0	Peru
Try: Elizalde (2) 1T, 8' c Vera 3' m D'Agostino 1T; Lizazú (2) 1T, 7' m Rossetto (2) 2T, 2T; Con: Vera 2', 5'; D'Agostino 8'; Pellandini 2T, 2T	Report

Estadio Héroes de Curupayty, Asunción

7 October 2022
17:14

Uruguay	12–10	Brazil
Try: Viñals 5' c Lijtenstein 2T m Con: Lijtenstein 5'	Report	Try: Robert Aguinaldo 1' m Romeu 9' m

Estadio Héroes de Curupayty, Asunción

7 October 2022
19:07

Chile	45–0	Peru
Try: Marchesse 2' c Alvarado 3' c Tchimino 5' m Armstrong 8' c Urbina 10' c Blanc 2T m Avelli 14' c Con: Bustamante 3'; Warnken 3'; Alvarado 8', 10', 14'	Report

Estadio Héroes de Curupayty, Asunción

7 October 2022
19:29

Argentina	41–0	Colombia
Try: D'Agostino (2) 1T m, 10' c Moneta (2) 3' m, 7' c Osadczuk 9' m Giudice 13' m Isgro 14' c Con: Moneta 7'; Isgro 11', 14'	Report

Estadio Héroes de Curupayty, Asunción

7 October 2022
19:51

Uruguay	28–7	Paraguay
Try: Ardao 2' c Viñals 6' c Mc Cubbin 8' c Facciolo 10' c Con: Brazionis (2/2) 3', 6'; Lijtenstein (2/2) 8', 11'	Report	Try: Sotelo 14' c Con: Mussi (1/1) 14'

Estadio Héroes de Curupayty, Asunción

8 October 2022
9:00

Chile	22–0	Colombia
Try: Videla 1T m Armstrong 6' m Warnken 10' c Urbina 13' m Con: Warnken 11'	Report

Estadio Héroes de Curupayty, Asunción

8 October 2022
9:22

Uruguay	12–33	Argentina
Try: Ardao 5' m Amarillo 14' c Con: Amarillo 14'	Report	Try: D'Agostino 2' c Osadczuk (3) 1T c, 8' m, 9' c Isgro 12' c Con: Isgro 2', 1T; Wade 9', 13'

Estadio Héroes de Curupayty, Asunción

8 October 2022
9:44

Brazil	12–7	Paraguay
Try: Da Silva 1T m De Morais 8' c Con: Lucas Rainho 8'	Report	Try: Sotelo 9' c Con: Urbieta (1/1) 9'

Estadio Héroes de Curupayty, Asunción

8 October 2022
11:32

Uruguay	40–0	Colombia
Try: Facciolo (2) 1' c, 14' c Amarillo 5' c Viñals 7' m Brazionis 11' c Álvarez 14' c Con: Lijtenstein 1', 6', 14'; Brazionis 11', 14'	Report

Estadio Héroes de Curupayty, Asunción

8 October 2022
16:50

Paraguay	22–7	Peru
Try: Berdejo 1T m Sotelo (2) 4' m, 6' c Mussi 9' m Con: Urbieta 7'	Report	Try: Rivera 8' c Con: Suárez (1/1) 8'

Estadio Héroes de Curupayty, Asunción

8 October 2022
17:12

Colombia	0–19	Brazil
	Report	Try: Felipe Sancery (2) 2' c, 9' m Robert Aguinaldo 10' c Con: Lucas Rainho 2', 11'

Estadio Héroes de Curupayty, Asunción

8 October 2022
17:34

Argentina	35–7	Chile
Try: Pellandini 2' c Fraga 3' c Moneta 7' c Lizazú 8' c Isgro 10' c Con: Wade (5/5) 2', 3', 7', 8', 10'	Report	Try: Videla 14' c Con: Alvarado (1/1) 14'

Estadio Héroes de Curupayty, Asunción

8 October 2022
19:27

Peru	5–52	Uruguay
Try: Terrones 10' m	Report	Try: Ardao 1T m Amarillo 2' c Deus (2) 5' c, 13' c Álvarez (2) 7' c, 8' m Brazionis (2) 11' c, 14' c Con: Álvarez 3', 5'; Lijtenstein 7', 11', 13', 14'

Estadio Héroes de Curupayty, Asunción

8 October 2022
19:49

Brazil	7–24	Chile
Try: Da Silva 3' c Con: Da Silva (1/1) 4'	Report	Try: Game 1T m Tchimino 7' c Warnken 8' c Blanc 11' m Con: Warnken 7', 8'

Estadio Héroes de Curupayty, Asunción

8 October 2022
20:11

Paraguay	0–43	Argentina
	Report	Try: Pellandini 1T m Lizazú (2) 3' c, 1T m Giudice 7' m Rossetto 10' c Wade (2) 11' c, 14' c Con: Pellandini 3'; Wade 10', 12', 14'

Estadio Héroes de Curupayty, Asunción

9 October 2022
9:00

Peru	0–31	Brazil
	Report	Try: Morais (2) 3' c, 10' m Felipe Sancery 6' c Matheus Augusto 7' c Guilherme Coghetto 13' m Con: Matheus Silva 4', 6', 7'

Estadio Héroes de Curupayty, Asunción

=== Final stage ===
The final stage consisted of the fifth place match, the bronze medal match and the gold medal match.

Fifth place match
9 October
Colombia	21
Paraguay	10

Bronze medal match
9 October
Uruguay	19
Brazil	12

Gold medal match
9 October
Argentina	19
Chile	7

==== Fifth place match ====
9 October 2022
19:00

Colombia	21–10	Paraguay
Try: Urrutia (3) 1' c, 9' c, 10' c Con: Urrutia (3/3) 2', 9', 11'	Report	Try: Urbieta 5' m Berdejo 2T m

Estadio Héroes de Curupayty, Asunción

==== Bronze medal match ====
9 October 2022
19:50

Uruguay	19–12	Brazil
Try: Ardao 3' m Pastore 9' c Amarillo 11' c Con: Lijtenstein 10', 12'	Report	Try: Lucas Drudi 1' c Da Silva 14' m Con: Matheus Silva 2'

Estadio Héroes de Curupayty, Asunción

==== Gold medal match ====
8 October 2022
20:45

Argentina	19–7	Chile
Try: Moneta (3) 1' c, 5' m, 8' c Con: Pellandini 2', 9'	Report	Try: Game 7' c Con: Warnken (1/1) 7'

Estadio Héroes de Curupayty, Asunción

== Final ranking ==
Rank	Team
1st place, gold medalist(s)	Argentina
2nd place, silver medalist(s)	Chile
3rd place, bronze medalist(s)	Uruguay
4	Brazil
5	Colombia
6	Paraguay
7	Peru

2022 Men's South American Rugby Sevens Champions

Argentina
Second title

Team roster: Rodrigo Isgro, Santiago Vera Feld, Ramiro D'Agostino, Tomás Lizazú, Agustín Fraga, Benjamín Elizalde, Joaquín Pellandini, Franco Rossetto, Matías Osadczuk, Tobias Wade, Franco Giudice, Marcos Moneta (c)
Head coach: Leonardo Gravano

== Medalists ==
Gold	Silver	Bronze
Argentina Rodrigo Isgro; Santiago Vera Feld; Ramiro D'Agostino; Tomás Lizazú; Agustín Fraga; Benjamín Elizalde; Joaquín Pellandini; Franco Rossetto; Matías Osadczuk; Tobias Wade; Franco Giudice; Marcos Moneta (c) Head coach: Leonardo Gravano	Chile Ernesto Tchimino; Manuel Bustamante; Clemente Armstrong; Tomás Alvarado; Diego Warnken; Cristóbal Game; Dante Marchesse; Lucca Avelli; Benjamín Videla; Joaquín Huici; Julio Blanc; Vicente Urbina Head coach: Edmundo Olfos	Uruguay James McCubbin; Marcos Pastore; Tomás Etcheverry; Carlos Deus Lopes; Icaro Amarillo; Diego Ardao; Mateo Viñals; Valentín Grille; Guillermo Lijtenstein; Ignacio Álvarez; Ignacio Facciolo; Koba Brazionis Head coach: Francisco Bulanti

== Qualified teams for Pan American Games ==
The following four teams from Sudamérica Rugby qualified for the 2023 Pan American Games women's rugby sevens tournament, including Chile which qualified as hosts.

Team	Qualified on	Previous appearances in Pan American Games^{1}
Chile	4 November 2017	3 (all) (2011, 2015, 2019)
Argentina	8 October 2022	3 (all) (2011, 2015, **2019**)
Uruguay	9 October 2022	3 (all) (2011, 2015, 2019)

^{1} Bold indicates champions for that year. Italic indicates hosts for that year.
