= Rugby sevens at the 2023 Pan American Games =

- Rugby sevens pictogram
- Venue: Estadio Municipal de La Pintana
- Start date: November 3, 2023
- End date: November 4, 2023
- No. of events: 2 (1 men, 1 women)
- Competitors: 192 from 10 nations

The tournaments of rugby sevens at the 2023 Pan American Games were held in Santiago, Chile in between November 3 and 4, 2023 at the Estadio Municipal de La Pintana in the commune of La Pintana.

A total of eight men's and eight women's teams (each consisting up to 12 athletes) competed in each tournament. This means a total of 192 athletes were scheduled to compete.

== Qualification ==
Eight men's teams and eight women's teams qualified to compete at the games in each tournament. The host nation (Chile) received automatic qualification in both tournaments, along with seven other teams.

=== Summary ===
Nation	Men's	Women's	Athletes
Argentina	Yes		12
Brazil	Yes	Yes	24
Canada	Yes	Yes	24
Chile	Yes	Yes	24
Colombia		Yes	12
Jamaica	Yes	Yes	24
Mexico	Yes	Yes	24
Paraguay		Yes	12
United States	Yes	Yes	24
Uruguay	Yes		12
Total: 10 NOCs	8	8	192

=== Men ===
Event	Dates	Location	Quota(s)	Qualified
Host Nation	—N/a	—N/a	1	Chile
Automatic qualification	—N/a	—N/a	2	Canada; United States
2022 South American Games	7–9 October	(Paraguay) Asunción	2	Argentina; Uruguay
2022 RAN Super Sevens	11–13 November	Mexico City	2	Jamaica; Mexico
2022 Sudamérica Rugby Sevens	26–27 November	(Costa Rica) San Jose	1	Brazil
Total			8	

=== Women ===
Event	Dates	Location	Quota(s)	Qualified
Host Nation	—N/a	—N/a	1	Chile
Automatic qualification	—N/a	—N/a	2	Canada; United States
2022 Sudamérica Rugby Sevens	10–11 June	(Brazil) Saquarema	1	Brazil
2022 South American Games	7–9 October	(Paraguay) Asunción	2	Paraguay; Colombia
2022 RAN Super Sevens	11–13 November	Mexico City	2	Mexico; Jamaica
Total			8	

== Participating nations ==
The following countries qualified rugby sevens teams. The numbers of participants qualified are in parentheses.

- Argentina (12)
- Brazil (24)
- Canada (24)
- Chile (24)
- Colombia (12)
- Jamaica (24)
- Mexico (24)
- Paraguay (12)
- United States (24)
- Uruguay (12)

== Medal summary ==
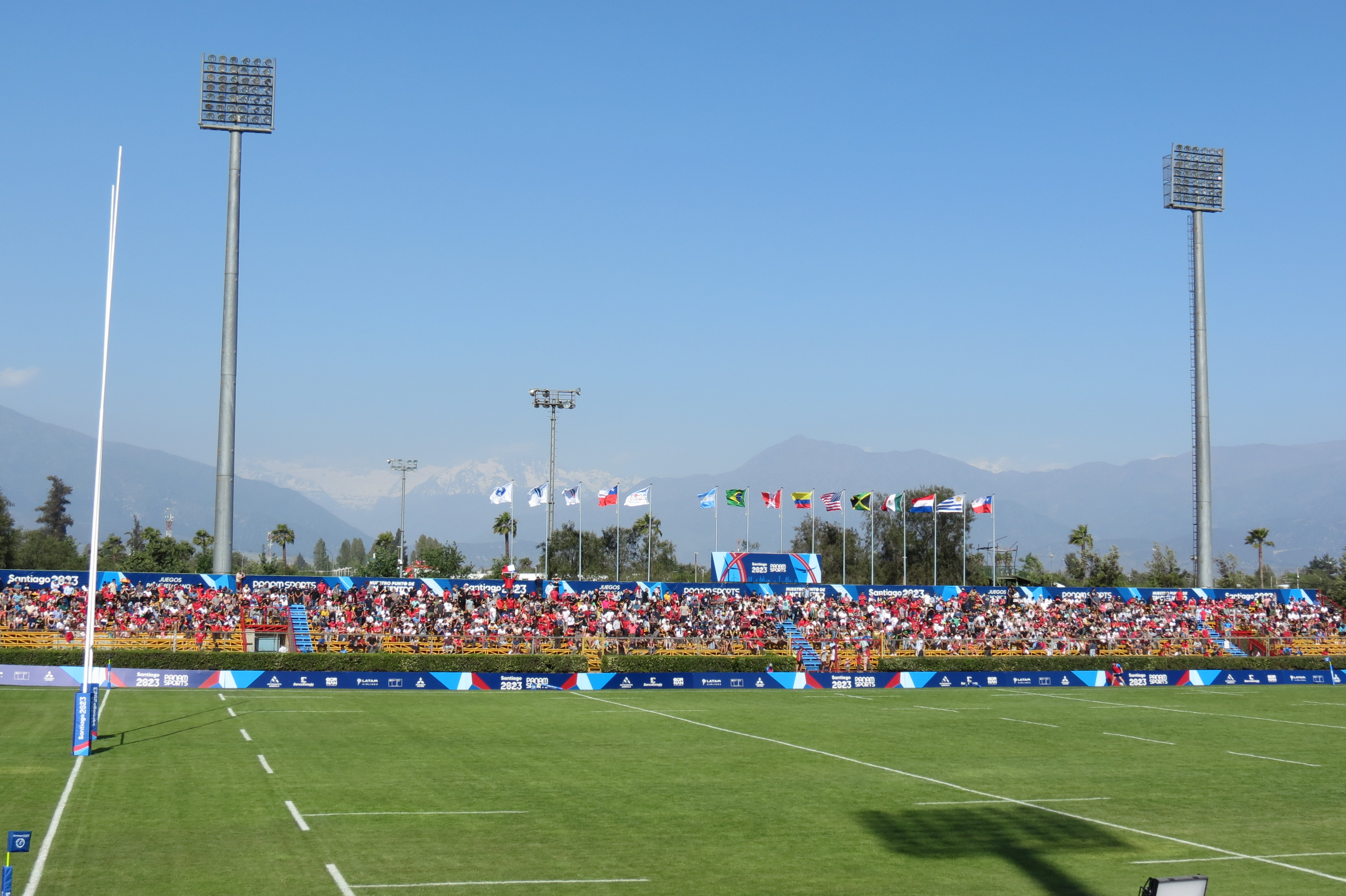
The rugby sevens venue during the competition

=== Medalists ===
Event	Gold	Silver	Bronze
Men's tournament	Argentina; Joaquín Pellandini; Santiago Verafeld; Germán Schulz; Matteo Graziano; Agustín Fraga; Santiago Álvarez; Alejo Lavayen; Gastón Revol; Matías Osadczuk; Santiago Mare; Luciano González; Marcos Moneta	Chile; Clemente Armstrong; Luca Strabucchi; Gonzalo Lara Mehech; Santiago Videla; Manuel José Bustamante; Cristóbal Game; Lucca Avelli; Ernesto Ariel Tchimino; Francisco Urroz; Diego Warnken; Nicolás Garafulic; Tomás Salas	Canada; Elias Ergas; Jacob Thiel; Kalin Sager; Phil Berna; Ethan Hager; Elias Hancock; Thomas Isherwood; Alexander Russell; John Carson; Lachlan Kratz; Matthew McDougall-Percillier; David Richard
Women's tournament	United States; Cheta Emba; Ilona Maher; Nicole Heavirland; Alena Olsen; Naya Tapper; Joanne Fa'avesi; Stephanie Rovetti; Kristi Kirshe; Alexandria Sedrick; Ariana Ramsey; Sammy Sullivan; Lauren Doyle	Canada; Olivia De Couvreur; Alysha Corrigan; Caroline Crossley; Breanne Nicholas; Lucienne Romeo; Charity Williams; Chloe Daniels; Margaret Valenzuela; Carissa Norsten; Eden Kilgour; Piper Logan; Asia Hogan-Rochester	Brazil; Mariana Nicolau; Luiza Campos; Rafaela Zanellato; Gisele Gomes; Thalia da Silva Costa; Milena Mariano; Aline Furtado; Marina Fioravanti; Andressa do Nascimento; Bianca dos Santos Silva; Gabriela Lima; Yasmim Soares

== See also ==
- Wheelchair rugby at the 2023 Parapan American Games
- Rugby sevens at the 2024 Summer Olympics
