= James McCubbin =

Uruguayan rugby union and sevens player (born 1998)

- Full name: James McCubbin Di Mateo
- Born: 27 May 1998 (age 28)
- Height: 187 cm (6 ft 2 in)
- Weight: 91 kg (201 lb; 14 st 5 lb)

Rugby union career
Senior career
Years	Team	Apps	(Points)
- Peñarol
International career
Years	Team	Apps	(Points)
2018	Uruguay Under-20		
National sevens team
Years	Team		Comps
2020–Present	Uruguay		
Medal record
Men's rugby sevens
Representing Uruguay
South American Games
Bronze medal – third place	2022 Asuncion	Team competition

James McCubbin Di Mateo (Note: In this Spanish name, the first or paternal surname is McCubbin and the second or maternal family name is Di Mateo.) (born 27 May 1998) is a Uruguayan rugby union player, currently playing for Súper Liga Americana de Rugby side Peñarol. He competed for the Uruguay national rugby sevens team at the 2024 Summer Olympics in Paris.

== Rugby career ==
McCubbin began playing rugby at the age of eight. In 2018, He competed for Uruguay's under-20 team at the Sudamérica Rugby Under-20 Championship. He later represented Uruguay at the 2018 World Rugby Under 20 Trophy competition that was held in Romania.

He represented Uruguay at the 2019 Pan American Games, where they finished in seventh place in Lima, Peru. In 2022, He was a member of the Uruguayan squad that finished tenth at the 2022 Rugby World Cup Sevens in Cape Town, South Africa.

McCubbin scored the first try in Uruguay's win against Chile at the 2023 Sudamérica sevens Olympic qualifying tournament as his side qualified for the Paris Olympics. Later in November, He represented Uruguay at the 2023 Pan American Games in Santiago, Chile.

He competed for Uruguay at the 2024 Summer Olympics in Paris.
