= Rodrigo Isgró =

Argentine rugby union player

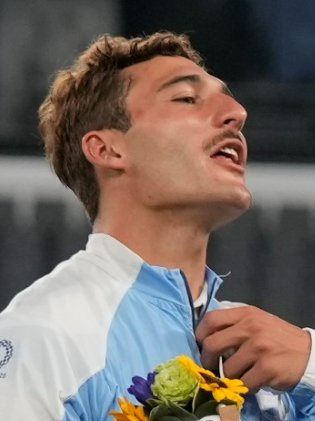
- Isgró in 2020
- Full name: Rodrigo Antonio Isgró Alastra
- Born: 24 March 1999 (age 27) Mendoza, Argentina
- Height: 1.83 m (6 ft 0 in)
- Weight: 100 kg (220 lb; 15 st 10 lb)

Rugby union career
- Position: Wing
- Current team: Harlequins
Senior career
Years	Team	Apps	(Points)
2024–	Harlequins	16	(35)
- Correct as of 17 August 2025
International career
Years	Team	Apps	(Points)
2019	Argentina U20	5	(10)
2023–	Argentina	16	(25)
- Correct as of 17 November 2025
National sevens team
Years	Team		Comps
2019–	Argentina		26
- Correct as of 28 August 2023
Medal record
Men's rugby sevens
Representing Argentina
Olympic Games
Bronze medal – third place	2020 Tokyo	Team competition
South American Games
Gold medal – first place	2022 Asuncion	Team competition

Rodrigo Antonio Isgró Alastra (born 24 March 1999) is an Argentine professional rugby union player who plays as a winger for Harlequins and Argentina.

== Early life ==
Isgró was born on 24 March 1999 in Mendoza, Argentina. He started playing rugby at the age of 4 at Mendoza Rugby Club, having been introduced to the sport by his uncle, who was also a rugby player.

== Club career ==
In September 2024, he signed for Rugby Premiership side Harlequins for the 2024–25 season. In October 2024, he made his debut for the club scoring two tries against Bath at the Stoop. The following week, he scored on in his first away game for the club in a 36–19 win against Exeter Chiefs. In April 2025, he was banned for three weeks, with the option to reduce to two weeks upon the completion of tackling safety course, after a head-on-head contact with Bath winger Joe Cokanasiga. In May 2025, after returning from his suspension, he scored two tries against Gloucester during a 38–19 victory in the Big Summer Kick Off fixture.

== International career ==
He played for Argentina in junior rugby and played 15 a side rugby union for Mendoza Rugby Club, and also appeared at the 2019 U20 World Championships. He was named in the Argentina squad for the Rugby sevens at the 2020 Summer Olympics.

He was part of the winning Pumas team at the 2022 South American Games.

Isgró made his fifteens test debut for Argentina against Australia in the 2023 Rugby Championship. He was later selected for Argentina's World Cup squad. He was named World Rugby Men's Sevens Player of the Year in October that year.

In 2024, He was named as a traveling reserve for Argentina at the Summer Olympics in Paris. He was free to play against France in the Quarter Final after completing his suspension, he also replaced Germán Schulz who suffered a grade 2 sprained knee.

In November 2025, having been 21–0 down, he scored a try as Argentina beat Scotland during the 2025 Autumn Nations Series.
