= Carissa Norsten =

Canadian rugby union and sevens player

- Born: November 7, 2003 (age 23) Waldheim, Saskatchewan
- University: University of Victoria

Rugby union career
- Position: Wing
International career
Years	Team	Apps	(Points)
2025–	Canada	1	(5)
- Correct as of 14 July 2025
National sevens team
Years	Team		Comps
- Canada
Medal record
Women's rugby sevens
Representing Canada
Olympics
Silver medal – second place	2024 Paris	Team competition
Pan American Games
Silver medal – second place	2023 Santiago	Team competition

Carissa Norsten (born November 7, 2003) is a Canadian rugby union and rugby sevens athlete.

== Career ==
Norsten was named to Canada's 2023 Pan American Games team in October. At the games Norsten would go onto win the silver medal with the team.

In June 2024, Norseten was named the rookie of the year on the women's 2023–24 SVNS series. In July 2024, Norsten was named to Canada's 2024 Olympic team in the sevens. The team won a silver medal, coming from 0-12 behind to defeat Australia 21-12 in the semi-finals, before losing the final to New Zealand.

She got her first 15s cap on the 2nd and last game of the 2025 tour to South Africa, where she scored her first international try and was named player of the match.
