= Rugby sevens at the 2022 South American Games =

Rugby sevens competitions at the 2022 South American Games

- Venue: Estadio Héroes de Curupayty
- Dates: 7−9 October 2022
- Competitors: 192 from 9 nations
- Teams: 16 (7 men and 9 women)

Medalists
gold medal	Argentina (men)
gold medal	Brazil (women)
silver medal	Chile (men)
silver medal	Paraguay (women)
bronze medal	Uruguay (men)
bronze medal	Colombia (women)

Rugby sevens competitions at the 2022 South American Games in Asunción, Paraguay were held between 7 and 9 October 2022 at the Estadio Héroes de Curupayty located within the Parque Olímpico cluster in Luque, a sub-venue outside Asunción.

Two medal events were scheduled to be contested: a men's and women's tournament. A total of 192 athletes (84 athletes–7 teams for men and 108 athletes–9 teams for women) competed in the events. Both tournaments were open competitions, however, players must be at least 17 years old at the start of the tournament.

The top two teams in each tournament (excluding Chile (in both tournaments) and Brazil (in the women's tournament)) qualified for the 2023 Pan American Games rugby sevens competitions, plus Chile which qualified automatically as the 2023 Pan American Games hosts.

Chile and Brazil were the defending champions of the South American Games men's and women's rugby sevens events. Chile had won the men's tournament in the Cochabamba 2018 edition while Brazil had won all previous women's tournament.

Argentina and Brazil won the gold medal in the men's and women's events respectively.

== Participating nations ==
A total of 9 ODESUR nations registered teams for the rugby sevens events. Each nation was able to enter a maximum of 24 athletes (one team of 12 players per gender). Bolivia and Venezuela competed in the women's event while the other seven nations competed in both events.

- Argentina (24 players)
- Bolivia (12)
- Brazil (24)
- Chile (24)
- Colombia (24)
- Paraguay (24)
- Peru (24)
- Uruguay (24)
- Venezuela (12)

== Schedule ==
The competition schedule is as follows:

G	Group stage	1/2	Semi-finals	B	Bronze medal match	F	Gold medal match

Date Event	Fri 7	Sat 8	Sun 9		
Men	G	G	G	B	F
Women	G	G	1/2	B	F

== Medal summary ==
=== Medal table ===
* Host nation (Paraguay)

Rank	Nation	Gold	Silver	Bronze	Total
1	Argentina (ARG)	1	0	0	1
1	Brazil (BRA)	1	0	0	1
3	Chile (CHI)	0	1	0	1
3	Paraguay (PAR)*	0	1	0	1
5	Colombia (COL)	0	0	1	1
5	Uruguay (URU)	0	0	1	1
Totals (6 entries)		2	2	2	6

=== Medalists ===
Event	Gold	Silver	Bronze
Men's tournament	Argentina; Agustín Fraga; Benjamín Elizalde; Franco Giudice; Franco Rossetto; Joaquín Pellandini; Marcos Moneta; Matías Osadczuk; Ramiro D'Agostino; Rodrigo Isgro; Santiago Vera Feld; Tobias Wade; Tomás Lizazú	Chile; Benjamín Videla; Clemente Armstrong; Cristóbal Game; Dante Marchesse; Diego Warnken; Ernesto Tchimino; Joaquín Huici; Julio Blanc; Lucca Avelli; Manuel Bustamante; Tomás Alvarado; Vicente Urbina	Uruguay; Carlos Deus Lopes; Diego Ardao; Guillermo Lijtenstein; Icaro Amarillo; Ignacio Álvarez; Ignacio Facciolo; James McCubbin; Koba Brazionis; Marcos Pastore; Mateo Viñals; Tomás Etcheverry; Valentín Grille
Women's tournament	Brazil; Aline Furtado; Andressa Alves; Anne Crystyan Santos; Bianca Silva; Camilla Carvalho; Eshyllen Cardoso; Isadora Lopes de Souza; Luiza Campos; Marcelle Souza; Mariana Nicolau; Marina Fioravanti; Thalia Costa	Paraguay; Araceli Nicolini; Chiara Báez; Cinthia Cristaldo; Ingrid Alfonso; Liz Verónica Romero; Lucero Viveros; Maira Méndez; María Benza; María Gauto; María Ramos; Paula Denis; Romina González	Colombia; Carmen Ibarra; Daniela Alzate; Juliana Soto; Laura Pacheco; Laura Mejía; Laura Álvarez; Madi Esther Córdoba; Camila Lopera; María Isabel Arzuaga; Maribel Mestra; Valentina Tapias; Valeria Muñoz

== Men's tournament ==
=== Preliminary round ===
Pos	Team	Pld	W	D	L	PF	PA	PD	Pts	Qualification
1	Argentina	6	6	0	0	233	29	+204	18	Gold medal match
2	Chile	6	5	0	1	141	61	+80	16	Gold medal match
3	Uruguay	6	4	0	2	156	74	+82	14	Bronze medal match
4	Brazil	6	3	0	3	89	74	+15	12	Bronze medal match
5	Colombia	6	2	0	4	72	134	−62	10	Fifth place match
6	Paraguay	6	1	0	5	55	141	−86	8	Fifth place match
7	Peru	6	0	0	6	12	245	−233	6	7th place

Source: ASU2022
Rules for classification: 1) Points; 2) Head-to-head result; 3) Points difference; 4) Tries difference; 5) Points scored; 6) Tries scored; 7) Fewest red cards received; 8) Fewest yellow cards received; 9) Drawing of lots.

=== Final stage ===
Fifth place match
9 October
Colombia	21
Paraguay	10

Bronze medal match
9 October
Uruguay	19
Brazil	12

Gold medal match
9 October
Argentina	19
Chile	7

=== Final standings ===
Rank	Team
1st place, gold medalist(s)	Argentina
2nd place, silver medalist(s)	Chile
3rd place, bronze medalist(s)	Uruguay
4	Brazil
5	Colombia
6	Paraguay
7	Peru

== Women's tournament ==
=== Preliminary round ===
==== Group 1 ====
Pos	Team	Pld	W	D	L	PF	PA	PD	Pts	Qualification
1	Brazil	2	2	0	0	71	12	+59	6	Cup groups
2	Uruguay	2	1	0	1	36	33	+3	4	Cup groups
3	Peru	2	0	0	2	0	62	−62	2	Challenge group

Source: ASU2022
Rules for classification: 1) Points; 2) Head-to-head result; 3) Points difference; 4) Tries difference; 5) Points scored; 6) Tries scored; 7) Fewest red cards received; 8) Fewest yellow cards received; 9) Drawing of lots.

==== Group 2 ====
Pos	Team	Pld	W	D	L	PF	PA	PD	Pts	Qualification
1	Colombia	2	2	0	0	73	7	+66	6	Cup groups
2	Chile	2	1	0	1	38	17	+21	4	Cup groups
3	Venezuela	2	0	0	2	7	94	−87	2	Challenge group

Source: ASU2022
Rules for classification: 1) Points; 2) Head-to-head result; 3) Points difference; 4) Tries difference; 5) Points scored; 6) Tries scored; 7) Fewest red cards received; 8) Fewest yellow cards received; 9) Drawing of lots.

==== Group 3 ====
Pos	Team	Pld	W	D	L	PF	PA	PD	Pts	Qualification
1	Argentina	2	2	0	0	65	0	+65	6	Cup groups
2	Paraguay	2	1	0	1	55	15	+40	4	Cup groups
3	Bolivia	2	0	0	2	0	105	−105	2	Challenge group

Source: ASU2022
Rules for classification: 1) Points; 2) Head-to-head result; 3) Points difference; 4) Tries difference; 5) Points scored; 6) Tries scored; 7) Fewest red cards received; 8) Fewest yellow cards received; 9) Drawing of lots.

=== Cup & Challenge stage ===
==== Cup group 1 ====
Pos	Team	Pld	W	D	L	PF	PA	PD	Pts	Qualification
1	Brazil	2	2	0	0	47	0	+47	6	Semi-finals
2	Paraguay	2	1	0	1	19	22	−3	4	Semi-finals
3	Chile	2	0	0	2	0	44	−44	2	Fifth place match

Source: ASU2022
Rules for classification: 1) Points; 2) Head-to-head result; 3) Points difference; 4) Tries difference; 5) Points scored; 6) Tries scored; 7) Fewest red cards received; 8) Fewest yellow cards received; 9) Drawing of lots.

==== Cup group 2 ====
Pos	Team	Pld	W	D	L	PF	PA	PD	Pts	Qualification
1	Argentina	2	2	0	0	20	7	+13	6	Semi-finals
2	Colombia	2	1	0	1	26	24	+2	4	Semi-finals
3	Uruguay	2	0	0	2	14	29	−15	2	Fifth place match

Source: ASU2022
Rules for classification: 1) Points; 2) Head-to-head result; 3) Points difference; 4) Tries difference; 5) Points scored; 6) Tries scored; 7) Fewest red cards received; 8) Fewest yellow cards received; 9) Drawing of lots.

==== Challenge group ====
Pos	Team	Pld	W	D	L	PF	PA	PD	Pts	Qualification
1	Peru	2	2	0	0	69	17	+52	6	Seventh place match
2	Venezuela	2	1	0	1	39	29	+10	4	Seventh place match
3	Bolivia	2	0	0	2	5	67	−62	2	9th place

Source: ASU2022
Rules for classification: 1) Points; 2) Head-to-head result; 3) Points difference; 4) Tries difference; 5) Points scored; 6) Tries scored; 7) Fewest red cards received; 8) Fewest yellow cards received; 9) Drawing of lots.

=== Final stage ===
Semi-finals
9 October
Brazil	28
Colombia	5
9 October
Argentina	14
Paraguay	15

Gold medal match
9 October
Brazil	17
Paraguay	5
Bronze medal match
9 October
Colombia	14
Argentina	7

Seventh place match
9 October
Peru	21
Venezuela	12

Fifth place match
9 October
Chile	15
Uruguay	0

=== Final standings ===
Rank	Team
1st place, gold medalist(s)	Brazil
2nd place, silver medalist(s)	Paraguay
3rd place, bronze medalist(s)	Colombia
4	Argentina
5	Chile
6	Uruguay
7	Peru
8	Venezuela
9	Bolivia
