= Thomas Isherwood (rugby union) =

Canadian rugby union player

- Full name: Thomas Isherwood
- Born: 23 August 2000 (age 26) Skelmanthorpe, England
- Height: 180 cm (5 ft 11 in)
- Weight: 87 kg (192 lb; 13 st 10 lb)
- School: Foothills Composite High School

Rugby union career
- Position: Fullback
- Current team: Westshore RFC
Youth career
- 2011-2018: Foothills Lions RFC
Senior career
Years	Team	Apps	(Points)
2018–2019	Morley RFC	14	(0)
2019–2020	Pacific Pride		
2019-	Westshore RFC		
2024-2025	Halifax Vandals	2	(14)
2025	Monaco Rugby Sevens		
- Correct as of 15 December 2024
International career
Years	Team	Apps	(Points)
2019–2020	Canada under-20	5	(14)
- Correct as of 15 December 2024
National sevens teams
Years	Team		Comps
2018–2019	Canada under-18		
2019–2020	Canada under-20		
2021–	Canada		37
- Correct as of 15 December 2024
Medal record
Men's rugby sevens
Representing Canada
Pan American Games
Bronze medal – third place	2023 Santiago	Team

Thomas Isherwood (born 23 August 2000) is an English-born Canadian rugby union player who plays for the Canada 7s team as well as Foothills Lions RFC.

Born in England, Isherwood moved over to Okotoks, Canada in 2011 joining local side Foothills Lions RFC. After graduating high school, he spent a season at Morley R.F.C. in England before returning to Canada to join Pacific Pride. He featured in the Canada under-20s side for the 2019 World Rugby under-20 Trophy in Brazil, as well as in a test series against Portugal.

Isherwood made his sevens debut in 2021 World Rugby Sevens Series as a late call up to the Canada national team in Edmonton. He's now gone on to play 35+ tournaments for Canada, including 28 on the HSBC world sevens series, Rugby 7s World Cup and a Pan American games.
