= David Richard =

Canadian international rugby union player

- Born: May 12, 2000 (age 26)

Rugby union career
- Position: Centre / Winger
International career
Years	Team	Apps	(Points)
2021–	Canada	3	(0)
Medal record
Men's rugby sevens
Representing Canada
Pan American Games
Bronze medal – third place	2023 Santiago	Team

David Richard (born May 12, 2000) is a Canadian international rugby union player.

A native of Milton, Ontario, Richard was educated at Jean Vanier Catholic Secondary School.

Richard, a centre and winger, specialises in rugby sevens, debuting for the national team in the 2018–19 season. He was capped for the Canada XV against Belgium in 2021 and made two more capped appearances the following year. In 2023, Richard was in the rugby seven side that claimed a bronze medal at the Pan American Games in Santiago, Chile.

== See also ==
- List of Canada national rugby union players
