= Benjamín Elizalde =

Argentina international rugby union player (born 2004)

- Born: 14 June 2004 (age 22) Salta, Argentina
- Height: 1.88 m (6 ft 2 in)
- Weight: 95 kg (209 lb)

Rugby union career
- Position: Full back/Wing
- Current team: Newcastle Red Bulls
Senior career
Years	Team	Apps	(Points)
−2024	Pampas XV	14	
2024−26	Bristol	27	(31)
2026−	Newcastle Red Bulls	0	(0)
International career
Years	Team	Apps	(Points)
2024	Argentina U20		
2025−	Argentina	4	(0)
National sevens team
Years	Team		Comps
2022	Argentina		
Medal record
Men's rugby sevens
Representing Argentina
South American Games
Gold medal – first place	2022 Asunción	Team competition

Benjamin Elizalde (born 14 June 2004) is an Argentine rugby union player who plays as a fullback or wing for PREM Rugby club Newcastle Red Bulls and the Argentina national team.

== Early life ==
From Salta before moving to Buenos Aires, Elizalde trained as a youngster with Tigres Rugby Club and Asociación Deportiva Francesa.

== Club career ==
Elizalde played for Pampas XV in the Super Rugby Americas, and started at full-back for Los Pampas in the Super Rugby Americas Final in 2024.

He joined Premiership Rugby side Bristol Bears in July 2024.

== International career ==
Elizalde has played rugby sevens for Argentina national rugby sevens team and was part of the winning Pumas team at the 2022 South American Games.

He played for Argentina U20 at the 2024 U20 Rugby World Cup and at the 2024 U20 Rugby Championship.

Elizalde made his debut for the senior Argentina national rugby union team starting at full-back against England on 5 July 2025.
