= Joaquín Pellandini =

Argentine rugby sevens player

- Born: 27 May 1999 (age 27) Buenos Aires, Argentina
- Height: 177 cm (5 ft 10 in)
- Weight: 72 kg (159 lb; 11 st 5 lb)

Rugby union career
- Position: Scrum-half
Senior career
Years	Team	Apps	(Points)
2025–	Chennai Bulls Olimpia Lions 2021		
National sevens team
Years	Team		Comps
2023–Present	Argentina		
Medal record
Men's rugby sevens
Representing Argentina
South American Games
Gold medal – first place	2022 Asuncion	Team competition
Pan American Games
Gold medal – first place	2023 Santiago	Team competition

Joaquín Pellandini (born 27 May 1999) is an Argentine rugby sevens player.His origin club is Buenos Aires CRC.He was present in the 2019 promotion of the club to the TOP12. He represented Argentina at the 2024 Summer Olympics in Paris.
