= Germán Schulz =

Argentine rugby sevens player

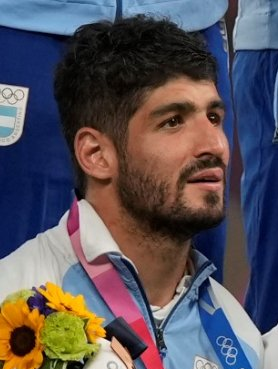
- Schulz in 2021
- Born: 5 February 1994 (age 32) Córdoba, Argentina
- Height: 188 cm (6 ft 2 in)
- Weight: 95 kg (209 lb)

Rugby union career
- Position: Wing
- Current team: Tala
Senior career
Years	Team	Apps	(Points)
2015–2018	Tala	8	(15)
- Correct as of 22 July 2021
International career
Years	Team	Apps	(Points)
2013–2014	Argentina U20	8	(10)
2013–2017	Argentina	3	(5)
2017–2018	Argentina XV	9	(20)
- Correct as of 22 July 2021
National sevens team
Years	Team		Comps
2014–2021	Argentina		43
- Correct as of 22 July 2021
Medal record
Men's rugby sevens
Representing Argentina
Olympic Games
Bronze medal – third place	2020 Tokyo	Team competition
Pan American Games
Gold medal – first place	2019 Lima	Team competition
Gold medal – first place	2023 Santiago	Team competition

Germán Schulz (born 5 February 1994) is an Argentine rugby sevens player. He competed for Argentina 7s at the 2016 Summer Olympics and won the bronze medal in the 2020 Summer Olympics.

Schulz also represented Argentina at the 2022 Rugby World Cup Sevens in Cape Town. He competed for Argentina at the 2024 Summer Olympics in Paris.
