= 2022 RAN Super Sevens =

- Hosts: Mexico
- Date: November 12–13, 2022
- Nations: 11

Final positions
- Champions: Jamaica
- Runners-up: Mexico
- Third: Bermuda

The 2022 RAN Super Sevens is a North American rugby sevens tournament that took place at the Estadio Alfredo Harp Helú in Mexico City, Mexico from November 12 to 13 in 2022. The tournament served as the qualifying event for the 2023 Central American & Caribbean Games, 2023 Pan American Games and the 2023 World Rugby Challenger Series.

Jamaica won the tournament and qualified for all three events. Runners-up, Mexico, only qualified to the Pan American, and the Central American & Caribbean Games. Bermuda and the Cayman Islands in finishing in the top four also qualified for the Central American & Caribbean Games.

== Teams ==
The following eleven teams participated in the tournament:

- Bahamas
- Barbados
- Belize
- Bermuda
- Cayman Islands
- Curaçao
- Dominican Republic
- Jamaica
- Mexico
- Saint Lucia
- Trinidad and Tobago

== Pool Stage ==
=== Pool A ===
Pos.	Team	Pld	W	D	L	F	A	Diff	Pts	Qualification
1	Jamaica	2	2	0	0	71	17	+54	6	Qualified to quarter finals
2	Trinidad and Tobago	2	1	0	1	41	33	+8	4	Qualified to quarter finals
3	Curaçao	2	0	0	2	7	69	–62	2	Qualified for Bowl

November 12

Jamaica	45–0	Curaçao

Estadio Alfredo Harp Helú

November 12

Trinidad and Tobago	17–26	Jamaica

Estadio Alfredo Harp Helú

November 12

Trinidad and Tobago	24–7	Curaçao

Estadio Alfredo Harp Helú

=== Pool B ===
Pos.	Team	Pld	W	D	L	F	A	Diff	Pts	Qualification
1	Mexico	3	3	0	0	154	0	154	9	Qualified to quarter finals
2	Cayman Islands	3	2	0	1	83	50	33	7	Qualified to quarter finals
3	Bahamas	3	1	0	2	48	97	-49	5	Qualified to quarter finals
4	Saint Lucia	3	0	0	3	14	152	-138	3	Qualified for Bowl

November 12

Mexico	64–0	Saint Lucia

Estadio Alfredo Harp Helú

November 12

Cayman Islands	38–5	Bahamas

Estadio Alfredo Harp Helú

November 12

Mexico	45–0	Bahamas

Estadio Alfredo Harp Helú

November 12

Cayman Islands	45–0	Saint Lucia

Estadio Alfredo Harp Helú

November 12

Mexico	45–0	Cayman Islands

Estadio Alfredo Harp Helú

November 12

Bahamas	43–14	Saint Lucia

Estadio Alfredo Harp Helú

=== Pool C ===
Pos.	Team	Pld	W	D	L	F	A	Diff	Pts	Qualification
1	Bermuda	3	3	0	0	88	24	64	9	Qualified to quarter finals
2	Barbados	3	2	0	1	90	21	69	7	Qualified to quarter finals
3	Dominican Republic	3	1	0	2	59	45	14	5	Qualified to quarter finals
4	Belize	3	0	0	3	0	147	-147	3	Qualified for Bowl

November 12

Bermuda	26–12	Dominican Republic

Estadio Alfredo Harp Helú

November 12

Barbados	59–0	Belize

Estadio Alfredo Harp Helú

November 12

Bermuda	48–0	Belize

Estadio Alfredo Harp Helú

November 12

Barbados	19–7	Dominican Republic

Estadio Alfredo Harp Helú

November 12

Bermuda	14–12	Barbados

Estadio Alfredo Harp Helú

November 12

Belize	0–40	Dominican Republic

Estadio Alfredo Harp Helú

== Knockout Stage ==
=== Bowl Final ===
Pos.	Team	Pld	W	D	L	F	A	Diff	Pts	
1	Dominican Republic	2	2	0	0	79	0	+79	6	Bowl Champion
2	Saint Lucia	2	1	0	1	31	32	–1	4	
3	Belize	2	0	0	2	0	78	–78	2	

November 13

Dominican Republic	47–0	Belize

Estadio Alfredo Harp Helú

November 13

Dominican Republic	32–0	Saint Lucia

Estadio Alfredo Harp Helú

November 13

Saint Lucia	31–0	Belize

Estadio Alfredo Harp Helú

=== Plate Final ===
Semi-finals
13 November – Estadio Alfredo Harp Helú
Bahamas	0
Barbados	29
13 November – Estadio Alfredo Harp Helú
Trinidad and Tobago	7
Curaçao	5

Plate Final (5th Place)
13 November – Estadio Alfredo Harp Helú
Barbados	26
Trinidad and Tobago	12
7th Place
13 November – Estadio Alfredo Harp Helú
Curaçao	36
Bahamas	0

=== Cup Final ===
Quarter-finals
13 November – Estadio Alfredo Harp Helú
Jamaica	42
Bahamas	5
13 November – Estadio Alfredo Harp Helú
Barbados	10
Cayman Islands	12
13 November – Estadio Alfredo Harp Helú
Bermuda	12
Trinidad and Tobago	5
13 November – Estadio Alfredo Harp Helú
Mexico	31
Curaçao	0

Semi-finals
13 November – Estadio Alfredo Harp Helú
Jamaica	24
Cayman Islands	5
13 November – Estadio Alfredo Harp Helú
Bermuda	14
Mexico	22

Cup Final
13 November – Estadio Alfredo Harp Helú
Jamaica	19
Mexico	14
3rd Place
13 November – Estadio Alfredo Harp Helú
Bermuda	19
Cayman Islands	14

== Final standings ==
Legend	
Green	Qualified for the 2023 Challenger Series
Red bar	Qualified for the 2023 Pan American Games
Blue bar	Qualified for the 2023 Central American and Caribbean Games

Pos	Team
1	Jamaica
2	Mexico
3	Bermuda
4	Cayman Islands
5	Barbados
6	Trinidad and Tobago
7	Curaçao
8	Bahamas
9	Dominican Republic
10	Saint Lucia
11	Belize
