= Koba Brazionis =

Uruguayan rugby union and sevens player

- Full name: Koba Francisco Brazionis Amondarai
- Born: 7 October 1998 (age 28)
- Height: 176 cm (5 ft 9 in)
- Weight: 79 kg (174 lb; 12 st 6 lb)

Rugby union career
Senior career
| Years | Team | Apps | (Points) |
- Peñarol
National sevens team
| Years | Team | | Comps |
| 2019–Present | Uruguay | | |
Medal record
Men's rugby sevens
Representing Uruguay
South American Games
| Bronze medal – third place | 2022 Asuncion | Team competition |

Koba Francisco Brazionis Amondarai (Note: In this Spanish name, the first or paternal surname is Brazionis and the second or maternal family name is Amondarai.) (born 7 October 1998) is a Uruguayan rugby union player, currently playing for Súper Liga Americana de Rugby side Peñarol. He competed for the Uruguay national rugby sevens team at the 2024 Summer Olympics in Paris.
