= Matteo Graziano =

Argentine rugby sevens player

- Full name: Matteo Joaquín Graziano
- Born: 21 July 2001 (age 25) Buenos Aires, Argentina
- Height: 195 cm (6 ft 5 in)
- Weight: 105 kg (231 lb; 16 st 7 lb)

Rugby union career
Senior career
Years	Team	Apps	(Points)
2025–	Delhi Redz		
National sevens team
Years	Team		Comps
2021–present	Argentina		
Medal record
Men's rugby sevens
Representing Argentina
Pan American Games
Gold medal – first place	2023 Santiago	Team competition
South American Games
Gold medal – first place	2026 Santa Fe/Rosario	Team competition
Youth Olympic Games
Gold medal – first place	2018 Buenos Aires	Team competition

Matteo Joaquín Graziano (born 21 July 2001) is an Argentine rugby sevens player. He represented Argentina at the 2024 Summer Olympics in Paris.
