= Julio Blanc =

Chilean rugby union and sevens player

- Born: Julio Blanc Schilling; 6 July 1995 (age 31) Chile
- Height: 1.74 m (5 ft 8 1/2 in)
- Weight: 80 kg (180 lb; 12 st 8 lb)

Rugby union career
- Position: Wing
Senior career
| Years | Team | Apps | (Points) |
| 2020– | Selknam | 1 | (0) |
- Correct as of 1 February 2021
International career
| Years | Team | Apps | (Points) |
| 2019– | Chile | 9 | (10) |
- Correct as of 1 February 2021
National sevens team
| Years | Team | | Comps |
| 2016–2019 | Chile Sevens | | 8 |
- Correct as of 1 February 2021
Medal record
Men's rugby sevens
Representing Chile
South American Games
| Silver medal – second place | 2022 Asuncion | Team competition |

Julio Blanc Schilling (Note: In this Spanish name, the first or paternal surname is Blanc and the second or maternal family name is Schilling.) (born 6 July 1995) is a Chilean rugby union player for Súper Liga Americana de Rugby side Selknam. His preferred position is wing.

== Professional career ==
Blanc signed for Súper Liga Americana de Rugby side Selknam ahead of the 2020 Súper Liga Americana de Rugby season, and re-signed ahead of the 2021 Súper Liga Americana de Rugby season. He had previously played for both the Chile national side and the Chile Sevens side. He competed for Chile at the 2022 Rugby World Cup Sevens in Cape Town.
