= Tomás Etcheverry =

Uruguayan rugby union player

- Born: Tomás Francisco Etcheverry Carrau; 14 February 2001 (age 25) Uruguay
- Height: 1.80 m (5 ft 11 in)
- Weight: 79 kg (174 lb)

Rugby union career
- Position: Fullback
Senior career
Years	Team	Apps	(Points)
2021–	Peñarol	0	(0)
- Correct as of 2 February 2021
National sevens team
Years	Team		Comps
2018–2019	Uruguay Sevens		4
- Correct as of 2 February 2021
Medal record
Men's rugby sevens
Representing Uruguay
South American Games
Bronze medal – third place	2022 Asuncion	Team competition

Tomás Francisco Etcheverry Carrau (Note: In this Spanish name, the first or paternal surname is Etcheverry and the second or maternal family name is Carrau.) (born 14 February 1991) is a Uruguayan rugby union player, currently playing for Súper Liga Americana de Rugby side Peñarol. His preferred position is fullback.

== Professional career ==
Etcheverry signed for Súper Liga Americana de Rugby side Peñarol ahead of the 2021 Súper Liga Americana de Rugby season. He has also represented the Uruguay Sevens team at 4 tournaments between 2018 and 2019.

In 2022, Etcheverry competed for Uruguay at the Rugby World Cup Sevens in Cape Town. He competed for Uruguay at the 2024 Summer Olympics in Paris.
