= Pita Vi =

American rugby player

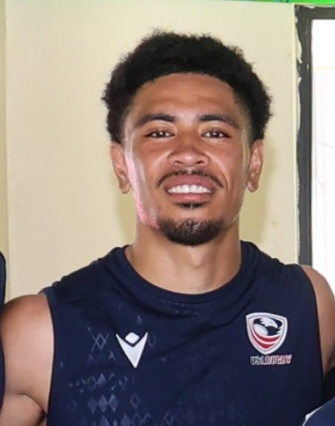
- Born: January 31, 2002 (age 24) Sacramento, California, U.S.

Rugby union career
National sevens team
Years	Team	Comps
- United States

Pita Vi (born January 31, 2002) is an American rugby sevens player. He was originally named as a traveling reserve for the United States at the 2024 Summer Olympics in Paris, but was later called up to the squad.
