= Mateo Viñals =

Uruguayan rugby union and sevens player

- Full name: Mateo Viñals Moratorio
- Born: 7 October 1998 (age 28)
- Height: 181 cm (5 ft 11 in)
- Weight: 81 kg (179 lb; 12 st 11 lb)

Rugby union career
Senior career
Years	Team	Apps	(Points)
- Peñarol
National sevens team
Years	Team		Comps
2020–Present	Uruguay		
Medal record
Men's rugby sevens
Representing Uruguay
South American Games
Bronze medal – third place	2022 Asuncion	Team competition

Mateo Viñals Moratorio (Note: In this Spanish name, the first or paternal surname is Viñals and the second or maternal family name is Moratorio.) (born 7 October 1998) is a Uruguayan rugby union player, currently playing for Súper Liga Americana de Rugby side Peñarol. He competed for the Uruguay national rugby sevens team at the 2024 Summer Olympics in Paris.
