= Diego Ardao =

Uruguayan rugby union and sevens player

- Full name: Diego Mateo Ardao Ferres
- Born: 4 August 1995 (age 31)
- Height: 177 cm (5 ft 10 in)
- Weight: 84 kg (185 lb; 13 st 3 lb)

Rugby union career
Senior career
Years	Team	Apps	(Points)
2024–	Peñarol		
2026	Hyderabad Heroes		
National sevens team
Years	Team		Comps
2018–Present	Uruguay		
Medal record
Men's rugby sevens
Representing Uruguay
South American Games
Bronze medal – third place	2022 Asuncion	Team competition

Diego Mateo Ardao Ferres (Note: In this Spanish name, the first or paternal surname is Ardao and the second or maternal family name is Ferres.) (born 4 August 1995) is a Uruguayan rugby union player, currently playing for Súper Liga Americana de Rugby side Peñarol. Ardao captained the Uruguay national rugby sevens team at the 2024 Summer Olympics in Paris.
