= Tobías Wade =

Argentine rugby player (born 1999)

- Born: 6 August 1999 (age 27) Buenos Aires, Argentina
- Height: 183 cm (6 ft 0 in)
- Weight: 82 kg (181 lb)

Rugby union career
- Position: Full back
- Current team: Zebre Parma
National sevens team
Years	Team	Comps
2022-	Argentina	
Medal record
Men's rugby sevens
Representing Argentina
South American Games
Gold medal – first place	2022 Asuncion	Team competition

Tobías Wade (born 6 August 1999) is an Argentine rugby union player who plays for the Argentina national rugby sevens team.

== Career ==
From Pilar, Buenos Aires, he played domestic rugby union for Asociación Alumni. He made his debut for Argentina national rugby sevens team at the SVNS World Series event in Singapore in 2022. He scored his first try as an international at that tournament against United States. He played for Argentina at the 2022 Rugby World Cup Sevens in South Africa. He was part of the winning Pumas team at the 2022 South American Games.

He scored a try in the final minute that confirmed Argentina as SVNS League Winners in May 2024. He was selected for the 2024 Paris Olympics.

He was a try scorer in the third/fourth playoff at the SVNS World Championship in Los Angeles in May 2025 as Argentina placed fourth overall.

Wade played as Los Pampas won the 2026 Super Rugby Americas. Following that, he joined Italian club Zebre Parma. In November 2026, Wade was brought into the Argentina national rugby union team for their 2026 Nations Championship fixtures in the Northern Henisphere.
