= Agustín Fraga =

Argentine rugby player (born 1999)

- Full name: Agustín Emiliano Fraga
- Born: 6 March 2002 (age 24) Buenos Aires, Argentina
- Height: 194 cm (6 ft 4 in)
- Weight: 102 kg (225 lb)

Rugby union career
- Position(s): Centre, Wing and Fullback
- Current team: Club Universitario de Buenos Aires
National sevens team
Years	Team	Comps
2022–	Argentina	
Medal record
Men's rugby sevens
Representing Argentina
Pan American Games
Gold medal – first place	2023 Santiago	Team competition
South American Games
Gold medal – first place	2022 Asunción	Team competition

Agustín Emiliano Fraga (born 6 March 2002) is an Argentine rugby union player who plays for the Argentina national rugby sevens team.

== Career ==
From Belgrano, Buenos Aires, Fraga plays domestic rugby union for Club Ciudad de Buenos Aires at full-back or wing. He made his debut for the Argentina national rugby sevens team in 2022.

He played for Argentina at the 2022 Rugby World Cup Sevens in South Africa. He was part of the winning Pumas team at the 2022 South American Games. He was part of the Argentine squad that won gold at the 2023 Pan American Games in Santiago.

Fraga played as Argentina became SVNS League Winners in May 2024. He was selected for the 2024 Paris Olympics and made a try scoring Olympic debut in their opening fixture against Kenya.
