= Santiago Vera Feld =

Argentine rugby sevens player

- Born: 29 March 2001 (age 25) Buenos Aires, Argentina
- Height: 181 cm (5 ft 11 in)
- Weight: 82 kg (181 lb; 12 st 13 lb)

Rugby union career
National sevens team
Years	Team	Comps
2021–Present	Argentina	
Medal record
Men's rugby sevens
Representing Argentina
South American Games
Gold medal – first place	2022 Asuncion	Team competition

Santiago Vera Feld (Note: In this Spanish name, the first or paternal surname is Vera and the second or maternal family name is Feld.) (born 29 March 2001) is an Argentine rugby sevens player. He represented Argentina at the 2024 Summer Olympics in Paris. Initially listed as a traveling reserve, he played in the seventh place playoff against the United States.
