= Santiago Mare =

Argentine rugby union player

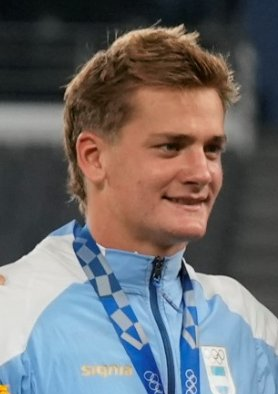
- Mare in 2021
- Born: 21 October 1996 (age 30) Buenos Aires, Argentina
- Height: 184 cm (6 ft 0 in)
- Weight: 92 kg (203 lb)

Rugby union career
- Current team: Mogliano
Senior career
Years	Team	Apps	(Points)
2016−2022	Regatas Bella Vista	24	(81)
2022	Jaguares XV	7	(39)
2022−2023	Mogliano	12	(30)
2025–	Mumbai Dreamers		
International career
Years	Team	Apps	(Points)
2021−	Argentina XV		
- Correct as of 28 July 2021
National sevens team
Years	Team		Comps
2018–present	Argentina		
- Correct as of 28 July 2021
Medal record
Men's rugby sevens
Representing Argentina
Olympic Games
Bronze medal – third place	2020 Tokyo	Team competition
Pan American Games
Gold medal – first place	2019 Lima	Team competition
Gold medal – first place	2023 Santiago	Team competition

Santiago Mare (born 21 October 1996) is an Argentine rugby union player who played for Italian team Mogliano in Top10. He made his debut appearance at the Olympics representing Argentina at the 2020 Summer Olympics.

== Career ==
He made his international rugby 7s debut for Argentina in 2017. He was selected in the national squad for the 2018 Rugby World Cup Sevens. He was also named in Argentine rugby sevens squad for the 2018–19 World Rugby Sevens Series.

He was also named in Argentine squad to compete at the 2020 Summer Olympics in the men's rugby sevens tournament. He was also subsequently part of the Argentine side which claimed bronze medal after defeating Great Britain 17–12 in the third place match at the 2020 Summer Olympics. It was also the first ever Olympic medal for Argentina in rugby sevens.

For 2022−23 season he played in Italy for Mogliano in Top10. He was a member of Argentina's sevens team that competed at the 2024 Summer Olympics in Paris.
