= Matías Osadczuk =

Argentine rugby union player

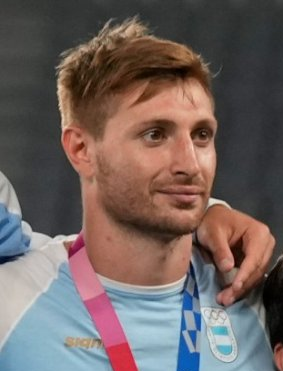
- Osadczuk in 2021
- Full name: Matías Lucas Osadczuk
- Born: 22 April 1997 (age 29) Buenos Aires, Argentina
- Height: 191 cm (6 ft 3 in)
- Weight: 96 kg (212 lb)

Rugby union career
- Position(s): Centre, Wing
- Current team: SITAS
2025–	Delhi Redz		
International career
Years	Team	Apps	(Points)
2016	Argentina U20		
2018	Argentina XV		
- Correct as of 3 April 2023
National sevens team
Years	Team		Comps
2017–	Argentina		40
- Correct as of 3 April 2023
Medal record
Men's rugby sevens
Representing Argentina
Olympic Games
Bronze medal – third place	2020 Tokyo	Team competition
Pan American Games
Gold medal – first place	2019 Lima	Team competition
Gold medal – first place	2023 Santiago	Team competition
South American Games
Gold medal – first place	2022 Asuncion	Team competition

Matías Lucas Osadczuk (born 22 April 1997) is an Argentine rugby union player and captain for Delhi Redz in Rugby Premier League.

== Rugby career ==
Osadczuk tore a knee ligament against Australia at the 2017 Hong Kong Sevens tournament and required surgery before he returned to competitive action at the 2018 Sydney Sevens tournament.

He won gold at the 2019 Pan American Games in Lima, Peru. He was named in the Argentina squad for the 2020 Summer Olympics. Osadczuk competed for Argentina at the 2022 Rugby World Cup Sevens in Cape Town.

He was a member of Argentina's sevens team that competed at the 2024 Summer Olympics in Paris.
