= Ignacio Facciolo =

Uruguay international rugby union player

- Born: 12 August 2001 (age 25)
- Height: 188 cm (6 ft 2 in)
- Weight: 91 kg (201 lb; 14 st 5 lb)

Rugby union career
- Position: Wing
International career
Years	Team	Apps	(Points)
2022–Present	Uruguay		
National sevens team
Years	Team		Comps
2022–Present	Uruguay 7s		
Medal record
Men's rugby sevens
Representing Uruguay
South American Games
Bronze medal – third place	2022 Asuncion	Team competition

Ignacio Facciolo (born 12 August 2001) is a Uruguayan rugby sevens player. He competed for Uruguay at the 2024 Summer Olympics in Paris.
