= Guillermo Lijtenstein =

Uruguayan rugby union and sevens player

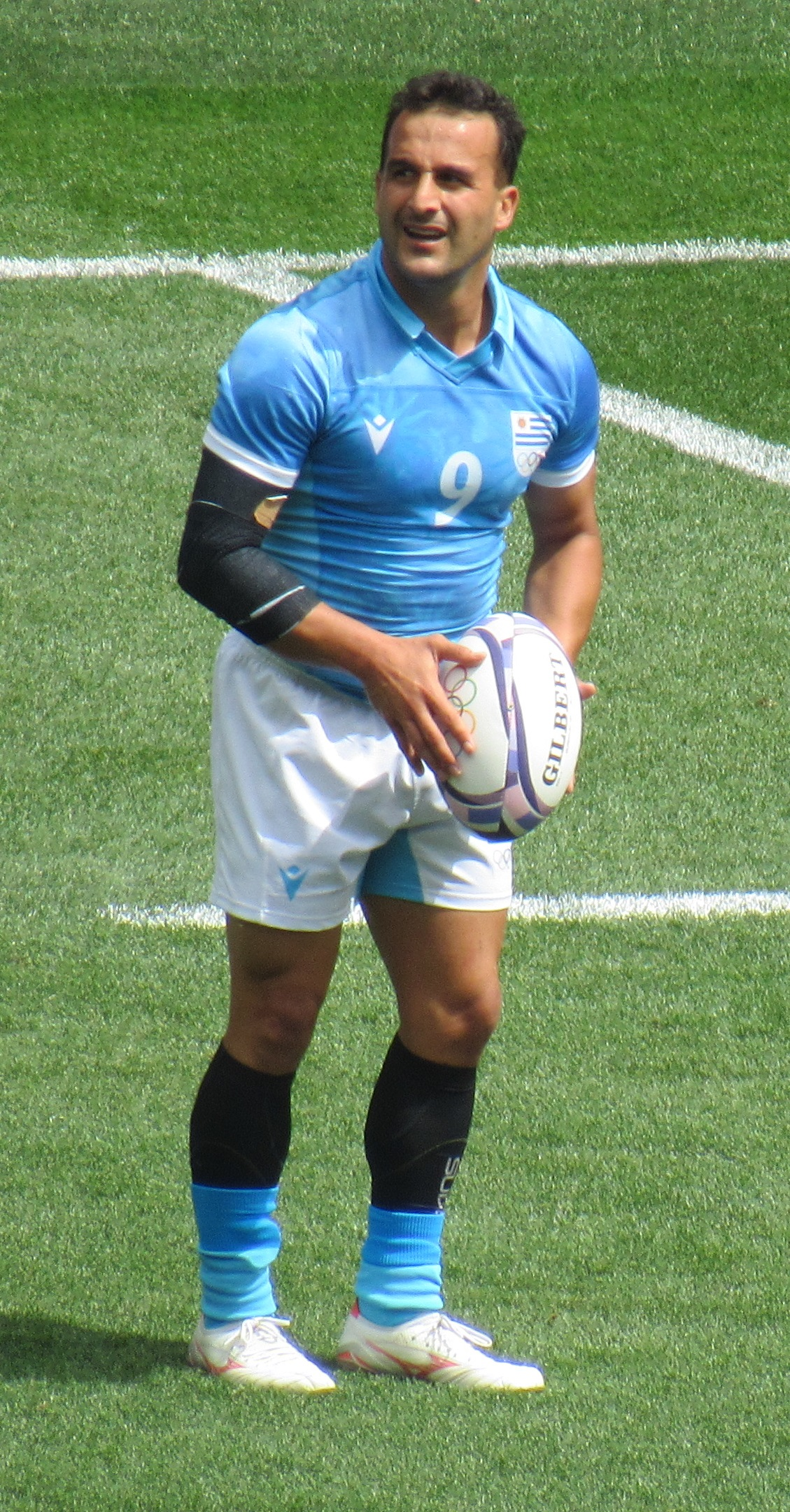
- Lijtenstein during Uruguay's match against USA at the 2024 Summer Olympics
- Born: 14 September 1990 (age 36)
- Height: 167 cm (5 ft 6 in)
- Weight: 77 kg (170 lb; 12 st 2 lb)

Rugby union career
Senior career
Years	Team	Apps	(Points)
- Peñarol
National sevens team
Years	Team		Comps
2011–Present	Uruguay		
Medal record
Men's rugby sevens
Representing Uruguay
South American Games
Bronze medal – third place	2022 Asuncion	Team competition

Guillermo Lijtenstein (born 14 September 1990) is a Uruguayan rugby union player, currently playing for Súper Liga Americana de Rugby side Peñarol. He competed for the Uruguay national rugby sevens team at the 2024 Summer Olympics in Paris.
