= Marcos Moneta =

Argentine rugby sevens player

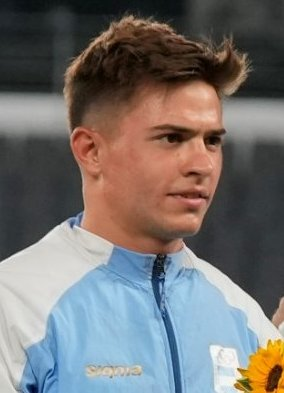
- Moneta at the 2020 Summer Olympics
- Born: 20 March 2000 (age 26) San Andrés, Buenos Aires, Argentina
- Height: 1.85 m (6 ft 1 in)
- Weight: 75 kg (165 lb)

Rugby union career
- Position: Fullback
Amateur team(s)
Years	Team	Apps	(Points)
2018−	San Andrés	5	
International career
Years	Team	Apps	(Points)
2018	Argentina U20		
National sevens team
Years	Team		Comps
2018–2024	Argentina		
Medal record
Men's rugby sevens
Representing Argentina
Olympic Games
Bronze medal – third place	2020 Tokyo	Team competition
Pan American Games
Gold medal – first place	2023 Santiago	Team competition
South American Games
Gold medal – first place	2022 Asunción	Team competition
Gold medal – first place	2026 Santa Fe/Rosario	Team competition
Youth Olympic Games
Gold medal – first place	2018 Buenos Aires	Team competition

Marcos Moneta (born 7 March 2000) is an Argentine rugby sevens player. He made his debut appearance at the Olympics representing Argentina at the 2020 Summer Olympics. Moneta received World Rugby's Men's Sevens Player of the Year award for 2021.

== Career ==
Moneta represented Argentina at the 2018 Summer Youth Olympics and was part of the Argentine team which defeated France 24–14 in the final to claim the gold medal in the boys rugby sevens tournament. He was also named in Argentine senior rugby sevens squad for the 2018–19 World Rugby Sevens Series. In 2021, he scored a hattrick of tries in a match against Kenya in the final of the Mi Visión del Juego final and was also the MVP of the tournament.

Moneta was also selected to Argentina squad to compete at the 2020 Summer Olympics in the men's rugby sevens tournament. He was also subsequently part of the Argentine side which claimed bronze medal after defeating Great Britain 17–12 in the third place match at the 2020 Summer Olympics. It was also the first ever Olympic medal for Argentina in rugby sevens.

Moneta competed for Argentina at the 2022 Rugby World Cup Sevens in Cape Town.

He was a member of Argentina's sevens team that competed at the 2024 Summer Olympics in Paris.
