= Luca Strabucchi =

Chilean rugby union player

- Born: 15 June 1999 (age 27) Chile
- Height: 1.81 m (5 ft 11 1/2 in)
- Weight: 83 kg (13.1 st; 183 lb)

Rugby union career
- Position: Centre / Wing / Fullback
Senior career
Years	Team	Apps	(Points)
2022–	Selknam	1	(0)
- Correct as of 19 March 2022
International career
Years	Team	Apps	(Points)
2019–	Chile	5	(10)
- Correct as of 19 March 2022
National sevens team
Years	Team		Comps
2020–	Chile Sevens		5
- Correct as of 19 March 2022

Luca Strabucchi (born 15 June 1999) is a Chilean rugby union player, currently playing for Súper Liga Americana de Rugby side Selknam. His preferred position is centre, wing or fullback.

== Professional career ==
Strabucchi signed for Súper Liga Americana de Rugby side Selknam ahead of the 2022 Súper Liga Americana de Rugby season. He had previously played for both the Chile national side and the Chile Sevens side. He competed for the Chile at the 2022 Rugby World Cup Sevens in Cape Town.
