= Benjamín Videla =

Chile international rugby union player

- Born: 24 April 2001 (age 25)
- Height: 176 cm (5 ft 9 in)
- Weight: 80 kg (176 lb; 12 st 8 lb)

Rugby union career
- Position: Scrum-half
Senior career
Years	Team	Apps	(Points)
2021–Present	Selknam		
International career
Years	Team	Apps	(Points)
2023–Present	Chile		
National sevens team
Years	Team		Comps
- Chile 7s

Benjamín Videla (born 24 April 2001) is a Chilean rugby union player. He plays Scrum-half for Chile internationally, and for Selknam in the Super Rugby Americas competition. He competed for Chile in the 2023 Rugby World Cup.

== Career ==
Videla joined Selknam in the Super Rugby Americas competition in 2021. He has represented Chile's national rugby sevens team.

He was selected in Chile's squad for the 2023 Rugby World Cup in France. He made his international debut for Chile in their pool clash against Samoa. He also got his first start for the national side against England.

In 2025, he was part of the Chilean team that qualified for the 2027 Rugby World Cup.

== Personal life ==
He is the younger brother of fellow Chile international, Santiago Videla. He is studying Commercial Engineering at Andrés Bello University in Chile.
