= Rugby sevens at the 2024 Summer Olympics – Men's team squads =

This article shows the squads of all participating teams for the men's rugby sevens competition at the 2024 Summer Olympics. Each squad was allowed up to 12 players, as well as two traveling reserves in case of injury.

== Group A ==
=== New Zealand ===
New Zealand's squad of 12 players was named on 20 June 2024. Additionally, Tim Mikkelson, Sione Molia and Joe Webber were named as traveling reserves.

Head coach: Junior Tomasi Cama

No.	Player	Date of birth (age)
1	Scott Curry	17 May 1988 (aged 36)
2	Brady Rush	24 April 1999 (aged 25)
3	Tone Ng Shiu	26 May 1994 (aged 30)
4	Akuila Rokolisoa	4 June 1995 (aged 29)
5	Dylan Collier (c)	27 April 1991 (aged 33)
6	Ngarohi McGarvey-Black	20 May 1996 (aged 28)
7	Fehi Fineanganofo	31 August 2002 (aged 21)
8	Andrew Knewstubb	14 September 1995 (aged 28)
9	Regan Ware	7 August 1994 (aged 29)
10	Tepaea Cook-Savage	8 February 2001 (aged 23)
11	Moses Leo	11 August 1997 (aged 26)
12	Leroy Carter	24 February 1999 (aged 25)
13	Joe Webber	27 August 1993 (aged 30)
14	Sione Molia	5 September 1993 (aged 30)

=== Ireland ===
Ireland's squad of 12 players was named on 17 June 2024. Additionally, Sean Cribbin and Bryan Mollen were named as traveling reserves.

Head coach: James Topping

No.	Player	Date of birth (age)
1	Jack Kelly	26 October 1997 (aged 26)
2	Andrew Smith	21 July 2000 (aged 24)
3	Harry McNulty (c)	5 March 1993 (aged 31)
4	Mark Roche	25 January 1993 (aged 31)
5	Zac Ward	11 December 1998 (aged 25)
6	Chay Mullins	23 January 2002 (aged 22)
7	Jordan Conroy	10 March 1994 (aged 30)
8	Hugo Keenan	18 June 1996 (aged 28)
9	Hugo Lennox	6 March 1999 (aged 25)
10	Terry Kennedy	4 July 1996 (aged 28)
11	Gavin Mullin	29 November 1997 (aged 26)
12	Niall Comerford	6 April 2000 (aged 24)
13	Sean Cribbin	20 August 1998 (aged 25)
14	Bryan Mollen	25 September 1995 (aged 28)

=== South Africa ===
South Africa's squad of 12 players was named on 10 July 2024. Additionally, Ronald Brown and Katlego Letebele were named as traveling reserves.

Head coach: Philip Snyman

No.	Player	Date of birth (age)
1	Christie Grobbelaar	25 May 2000 (aged 24)
2	Ryan Oosthuizen	22 May 1995 (aged 29)
3	Impi Visser	30 May 1995 (aged 29)
4	Zain Davids	4 May 1997 (aged 27)
5	Quewin Nortje	14 January 2003 (aged 21)
6	Tiaan Pretorius	19 February 2001 (aged 23)
7	Tristan Leyds	24 May 1997 (aged 27)
8	Selvyn Davids (c)	26 March 1994 (aged 30)
9	Shaun Williams	13 April 1998 (aged 26)
10	Rosko Specman	28 April 1989 (aged 35)
11	Siviwe Soyizwapi	7 December 1992 (aged 31)
12	Shilton van Wyk	22 December 1999 (aged 24)
13	Ronald Brown	2 September 1995 (aged 28)

=== Japan ===
Japan's squad of 12 players was named on 4 July 2024. Additionally, Naoki Motomura and Taichi Yoshizawa were named as traveling reserves.

Head coach: Simon Amor

No.	Player	Date of birth (age)
1	Taiga Ishida	1 October 1997 (aged 26)
2	Kippei Ishida (c)	28 April 2000 (aged 24)
3	Shotaro Tsuoka	22 March 1996 (aged 28)
4	Junya Matsumoto	17 March 2000 (aged 24)
5	Josua Kerevi	18 June 1992 (aged 32)
6	Moeki Fukushi	11 March 1999 (aged 25)
7	Kippei Taninaka	4 June 2000 (aged 24)
8	Yoshihiro Noguchi	26 December 1994 (aged 29)
9	Kazuma Ueda	4 December 2002 (aged 21)
10	Takamasa Maruo	8 January 1999 (aged 25)
11	Yu Okudaira	26 May 1999 (aged 25)
12	Yoshiyuki Koga	28 August 1998 (aged 25)

== Group B ==
=== Argentina ===
Argentina's squad of 12 players was named on 28 June 2024. Additionally, Rodrigo Isgró and Santiago Vera Feld were named as traveling reserves.

Head coach: Santiago Gómez Cora

No.	Player	Date of birth (age)
1	Joaquín Pellandini	27 May 1999 (aged 25)
2	Tomás Elizalde	18 November 2002 (aged 21)
3	Germán Schulz	5 February 1994 (aged 30)
4	Matteo Graziano	21 July 2001 (aged 23)
5	Agustín Fraga	6 March 2002 (aged 22)
6	Santiago Álvarez (c)	17 February 1994 (aged 30)
7	Tobías Wade	6 August 1999 (aged 24)
8	Gastón Revol	26 November 1986 (aged 37)
9	Matías Osadczuk	22 April 1997 (aged 27)
10	Santiago Mare	21 October 1996 (aged 27)
11	Luciano González	10 April 1997 (aged 27)
12	Marcos Moneta	7 March 2000 (aged 24)
13	Rodrigo Isgró	24 March 1999 (aged 25)
14	Santiago Vera Feld	29 March 2001 (aged 23)

=== Australia ===
Australia's squad of 12 players was named on 2 July 2024. Additionally, Michael Icely and Josh Turner were named as traveling reserves.

Head coach: John Manenti

No.	Player	Date of birth (age)
1	Henry Hutchison	12 February 1997 (aged 27)
2	Ben Dowling	5 March 2002 (aged 22)
3	Corey Toole	7 March 2000 (aged 24)
4	Dietrich Roache	6 July 2001 (aged 23)
5	Mark Nawaqanitawase	11 September 2000 (aged 23)
6	Henry Paterson	26 February 1997 (aged 27)
7	Hayden Sargeant	11 March 1998 (aged 26)
8	James Turner	29 August 1998 (aged 25)
9	Matt Gonzalez	1 June 1994 (aged 30)
10	Nick Malouf (c)	19 March 1993 (aged 31)
11	Maurice Longbottom	30 January 1995 (aged 29)
12	Nathan Lawson	23 January 1999 (aged 25)

=== Samoa ===
Samoa's squad of 12 players was finalized on 18 July 2024. Additionally, Paul Eti Slater and Malakesi Masefau were named as traveling reserves.

Head coach: Brian Lima

No.	Player	Date of birth (age)
1	Vaovasa Afa Su'a	11 October 1991 (aged 32)
2	Alamanda Motuga	11 September 1994 (aged 29)
3	BJ Telefoni Lima	23 July 1999 (aged 25)
4	Motu Opetai	20 June 2001 (aged 23)
5	Tom Maiava	6 March 1999 (aged 25)
6	Taunu'u Niulevaea	21 January 2000 (aged 24)
7	Lalomilo Lalomilo	12 February 1999 (aged 25)
8	Neueli Leitufia	24 October 2001 (aged 22)
9	Fa'afoi Falaniko	14 March 2002 (aged 22)
10	Paul Scanlan	9 August 1996 (aged 27)
11	Steve Onosai	19 September 2001 (aged 22)
12	Va'a Apelu Maliko (c)	10 November 1998 (aged 25)

=== Kenya ===
Kenya's squad of 12 players was named on 2 July 2024. Additionally, Festus Shiasi and Denis Abukuse were named as traveling reserves.

Head coach: Kevin Wambua

No.	Player	Date of birth (age)
1	John Okoth	28 April 2000 (aged 24)
2	Lamec Ambetsa	27 January 2000 (aged 24)
3	George Ooro	3 March 2000 (aged 24)
4	Vincent Onyala	10 December 1996 (aged 27)
5	Brian Tanga	19 September 1995 (aged 28)
6	Kevin Wekesa	7 August 2000 (aged 23)
7	Tony Omondi (c)	26 March 1995 (aged 29)
8	Herman Humwa	8 November 1995 (aged 28)
9	Samuel Asati	14 March 1999 (aged 25)
10	Nygel Amaitsa	26 May 2002 (aged 22)
11	Patrick Odongo	20 March 2002 (aged 22)
12	Chrisant Ojwang	15 December 1998 (aged 25)

== Group C ==
=== Fiji ===
Fiji's squad of 12 players was finalized on 18 July 2024. Additionally, Josaia Raisuqe and Filipe Sauturaga were named as traveling reserves.

Head coach: Osea Kolinisau

No.	Player	Date of birth (age)
1	Joji Nasova	9 June 2000 (aged 24)
2	Joseva Talacolo	1 April 1997 (aged 27)
3	Jeremaia Matana	14 July 1998 (aged 26)
4	Sevuloni Mocenacagi	29 June 1990 (aged 34)
5	Iosefo Baleiwairiki	9 May 1998 (aged 26)
6	Ponepati Loganimasi	26 March 1998 (aged 26)
7	Terio Veilawa	6 July 1994 (aged 30)
8	Waisea Nacuqu	24 May 1993 (aged 31)
9	Jerry Tuwai (c)	23 March 1989 (aged 35)
10	Iowane Teba	23 February 1993 (aged 31)
11	Kaminieli Rasaku	12 July 1999 (aged 25)
12	Selestino Ravutaumada	17 January 2000 (aged 24)
13	Josaia Raisuqe	22 July 1994 (aged 30)

=== France ===
France's squad of 12 players was named on 8 July 2024. Additionally, Nelson Epee and William Iraguha were named as traveling reserves.

Head coach: Jérôme Daret

No.	Player	Date of birth (age)
1	Varian Pasquet	29 July 1999 (aged 25)
2	Andy Timo	28 May 2004 (aged 20)
3	Rayan Rebbadj	15 August 1999 (aged 24)
4	Théo Forner	17 October 2001 (aged 22)
5	Stephen Parez	1 August 1994 (aged 29)
6	Paulin Riva (c)	20 April 1994 (aged 30)
7	Jefferson-Lee Joseph	29 October 2002 (aged 21)
8	Antoine Zeghdar	22 May 1999 (aged 25)
9	Aaron Grandidier Nkanang	18 May 2000 (aged 24)
10	Jean-Pascal Barraque	24 April 1991 (aged 33)
11	Antoine Dupont	15 November 1996 (aged 27)
12	Jordan Sepho	8 December 1998 (aged 25)

=== United States ===
USA's squad of 12 players was named on 1 July 2024. Additionally, Adam Channel and Pita Vi were named as traveling reserves.

Head coach: Mike Friday

No.	Player	Date of birth (age)
1	Aaron Cummings	1 July 1997 (aged 27)
2	Maka Unufe	28 September 1991 (aged 32)
3	Orrin Bizer	13 December 2000 (aged 23)
4	Matai Leuta	20 July 1990 (aged 34)
5	Marcus Tupuola	5 October 1995 (aged 28)
6	Kevon Williams (c)	7 June 1991 (aged 33)
7	Naima Fuala'au	17 June 1998 (aged 26)
8	Malacchi Esdale	4 May 1995 (aged 29)
9	Stephen Tomasin	25 September 1994 (aged 29)
10	Madison Hughes	26 October 1992 (aged 31)
11	Perry Baker	29 June 1986 (aged 38)
12	Lucas Lacamp	4 June 2001 (aged 23)
13	Pita Vi	31 January 2002 (aged 22)
14	Adam Channel	16 January 1997 (aged 27)

=== Uruguay ===
Uruguay's squad of 12 players was named on 11 July 2024. Additionally, Koba Brazionis and Dante Soto were named as traveling reserves.

Head coach: Ivo Dugonjic

No.	Player	Date of birth (age)
1	James McCubbin	27 May 1998 (aged 26)
2	Valentin Grille	15 June 1998 (aged 26)
3	Tomás Etcheverry	30 September 2001 (aged 22)
4	Juan Manuel Tafernaberry	27 May 2002 (aged 22)
5	Bautista Basso	18 January 2001 (aged 23)
6	Diego Ardao (c)	4 August 1995 (aged 28)
7	Mateo Viñals	7 October 1998 (aged 25)
8	Felipe Arcos Pérez	17 May 2000 (aged 24)
9	Guillermo Lijtenstein	14 September 1990 (aged 33)
10	Baltazar Amaya	26 May 1999 (aged 25)
11	Ignacio Facciolo	12 August 2001 (aged 22)
12	Juan Gonzalez	12 April 2003 (aged 21)
13	Koba Brazionis	7 October 1998 (aged 25)
14	Dante Soto	2 June 2003 (aged 21)
