= Uruguay at the 2024 Summer Olympics =

- IOC code: URU
- NOC: Uruguayan Olympic Committee
- Website: www.cou.org.uy (in Spanish)

in Paris, France 26 July 2024 – 11 August 2024
- Competitors: 25 (21 men and 4 women) in 9 sports
- Flag bearers (opening): Emiliano Lasa & María Sara Grippoli
- Flag bearers (closing): Matías Otero & Dolores Moreira
- Medals: Gold 0 Silver 0 Bronze 0 Total 0

Summer Olympics appearances (overview)
- 1924; 1928; 1932; 1936; 1948; 1952; 1956; 1960; 1964; 1968; 1972; 1976; 1980; 1984; 1988; 1992; 1996; 2000; 2004; 2008; 2012; 2016; 2020; 2024

Uruguay competed at the 2024 Summer Olympics in Paris from 26 July to 11 August 2024. Since the nation's official debut in 1920, Uruguayan athletes have appeared in every edition of the Summer Olympic Games, except for Moscow 1980 as part of the United States-led boycott.

== Competitors ==
The following is the list of number of competitors in the Games.

Sport	Men	Women	Total
Athletics	2	1	3
Canoeing	1	0	1
Cycling	1	0	1
Judo	1	0	1
Rowing	1	0	1
Rugby sevens	12	0	12
Sailing	2	1	3
Swimming	1	1	2
Taekwondo	0	1	1
Total	21	4	25

== Athletics ==
Uruguayan track and field athletes achieved the entry standards for Paris 2024, either by passing the direct qualifying mark (or time for track and road races) or by world ranking, in the following events (a maximum of 3 athletes each, one man was qualified by Universality place):

Key

- Note–Ranks given for track events are within the athlete's heat only
- Q = Qualified for the next round
- q = Qualified for the next round as a fastest loser or, in field events, by position without achieving the qualifying target
- NR = National record
- N/A = Round not applicable for the event
- Bye = Athlete not required to compete in round

Track & road events

Athlete	Event	Heat		Repechage		Semifinal		Final	
Athlete	Event	Result	Rank	Result	Rank	Result	Rank	Result	Rank
Santiago Catrofe	Men's 5000 m	13:56.40	14	—				Did not advance	
María Pía Fernández	Women's 1500 m	4:19.30	15 R	4:16.46	12	Did not advance			

Field events

Athlete	Event	Qualification		Final	
Athlete	Event	Distance	Position	Distance	Position
Emiliano Lasa	Men's long jump	7.87	13	Did not advance	

== Canoeing ==
=== Sprint ===
For the first time since 2004, Uruguayan canoeists qualified one boat in the following distances for the Games through the 2024 Pan American Canoe Sprint Olympic Qualifiers in Sarasota, United States.

Athlete	Event	Heats		Quarterfinals		Semifinals		Final	
Athlete	Event	Time	Rank	Time	Rank	Time	Rank	Time	Rank
Matías Otero	Men's K-1 1000 m	3:43.65	5	3:30.81	2	3:48.91	9 FB	3:30.48	14

Qualification Legend: FA = Qualify to final (medal); FB = Qualify to final B (non-medal)

== Cycling ==
=== Road ===
For the first time since 2012, Uruguay entered one male rider to compete in the road race events at the Olympic, after getting the re-allocation of unused quota places through the UCI Nation Ranking.

Athlete	Event	Time	Rank
Eric Fagúndez	Men's road race	6:28:31	55

== Judo ==
Uruguay qualified one judoka for the following weight class at the Games. Alain Mikael Aprahamian (men's half-middleweight, 81 kg) got qualified via continental quota based on Olympic point rankings.

Athlete	Event	Round of 64	Round of 32	Round of 16	Quarterfinals	Semifinals	Repechage	Final / BM	
Athlete	Event	Opposition Result	Opposition Result	Opposition Result	Opposition Result	Opposition Result	Opposition Result	Opposition Result	Rank
Alain Mikael Aprahamian	Men's –81 kg	Bye	Nagase (JPN); L 00–10	Did not advance					

== Rowing ==
Uruguayan rowers qualified one boats in the men's single sculls for the Games, through the 2024 Americas Qualification Regatta in Rio de Janeiro, Brazil.

Athlete	Event	Heats		Repechage		Quarterfinals		Semifinals		Final	
Athlete	Event	Time	Rank	Time	Rank	Time	Rank	Time	Rank	Time	Rank
Bruno Cetraro	Men's single sculls	7:04.04	2 QF	Bye		6:51.43	3 SA/B	7:08.29	5 FB	7:22.71	12

Qualification Legend: FA=Final A (medal); FB=Final B (non-medal); FC=Final C (non-medal); FD=Final D (non-medal); FE=Final E (non-medal); FF=Final F (non-medal); SA/B=Semifinals A/B; SC/D=Semifinals C/D; SE/F=Semifinals E/F; QF=Quarterfinals; R=Repechage

== Rugby sevens ==
Summary

Team	Event	Pool round				Classification	Classification	
Team	Event	Opposition Result	Opposition Result	Opposition Result	Rank	Opposition Result	Opposition Result	Rank
Uruguay men's	Men's tournament	Fiji; L 12–40	France; L 12–19	United States; L 17–33	4	Kenya; L 14–19	Japan; W 21–10	11

=== Men's tournament ===
Uruguay national rugby sevens team qualified for the Olympics by winning the gold medal and securing an outright berth at the 2023 Sudamérica Olympic Qualifying Tournament in Montevideo, marking the nation's debut in the sport.

Team roster

Uruguay's squad of 12 players was named on 11 July 2024. Additionally, Koba Brazionis and Dante Soto were named as traveling reserves.

Head coach: Ivo Dugonjic

No.	Player	Date of birth (age)
1	James McCubbin	27 May 1998 (aged 26)
2	Valentin Grille	15 June 1998 (aged 26)
3	Tomás Etcheverry	30 September 2001 (aged 22)
4	Juan Manuel Tafernaberry	27 May 2002 (aged 22)
5	Bautista Basso	18 January 2001 (aged 23)
6	Diego Ardao (c)	4 August 1995 (aged 28)
7	Mateo Viñals	7 October 1998 (aged 25)
8	Felipe Arcos Pérez	17 May 2000 (aged 24)
9	Guillermo Lijtenstein	14 September 1990 (aged 33)
10	Baltazar Amaya	26 May 1999 (aged 25)
11	Ignacio Facciolo	12 August 2001 (aged 22)
12	Juan Gonzalez	12 April 2003 (aged 21)
13	Koba Brazionis	7 October 1998 (aged 25)
14	Dante Soto	2 June 2003 (aged 21)

Group stage

Pos	Team	Pld	W	D	L	PF	PA	PD	Pts	Qualification
1	Fiji	3	3	0	0	97	36	+61	9	Advance to Quarter-finals
2	France (H)	3	1	1	1	43	43	0	6	Advance to Quarter-finals
3	United States	3	1	1	1	57	67	−10	6	Advance to Quarter-finals
4	Uruguay	3	0	0	3	41	92	−51	3	

Source: World Rugby
Rules for classification: 1) Points; 2) Head-to-head result; 3) Point difference; 4) Points scored.
(H) Hosts

24 July 2024
17:00

Fiji	40–12	Uruguay
Try: Nasova (2) 2' m, 7' c Loganimasi 5' c Nacuqu 8' c Teba 11' c Ravutaumada 15' c Con: Nacuqu (3/4) 6', 7', 8'; Teba (1/1) 12'; Tamani (1/1) 25'	World Rugby	Try: González 4' c Basso 10' m Con: Lijtenstein (1/1) 4'

Stade de France, Paris
Attendance: 69,000
Referee: Ben Breakspear (Wales/Great Britain)

24 July 2024
20:00

France	19–12	Uruguay
Try: Zeghdar 3' c Dupont 9' m Joseph 12' c Con: Barraque (2/3) 10', 14'	World Rugby	Try: Facciolo 8' c González 10' m Con: Lijtenstein (1/1) 8'

Stade de France, Paris
Attendance: 69,000
Referee: Nick Hogan (New Zealand)

25 July 2024
15:00

United States	33–17	Uruguay
Try: Baker (4) 1' c, 8' c, 11' c, 14' m Lacamp 8' c Con: Tomasin (4/5) 1', 9', 9', 11'	World Rugby	Try: Amaya (2) 3' m, 13' m Basso 5' c Con: Lijtenstein (1/2) 6'

Stade de France, Paris
Attendance: 70,000
Referee: Jérémy Rozier (France)

9–12th place playoff semi-final

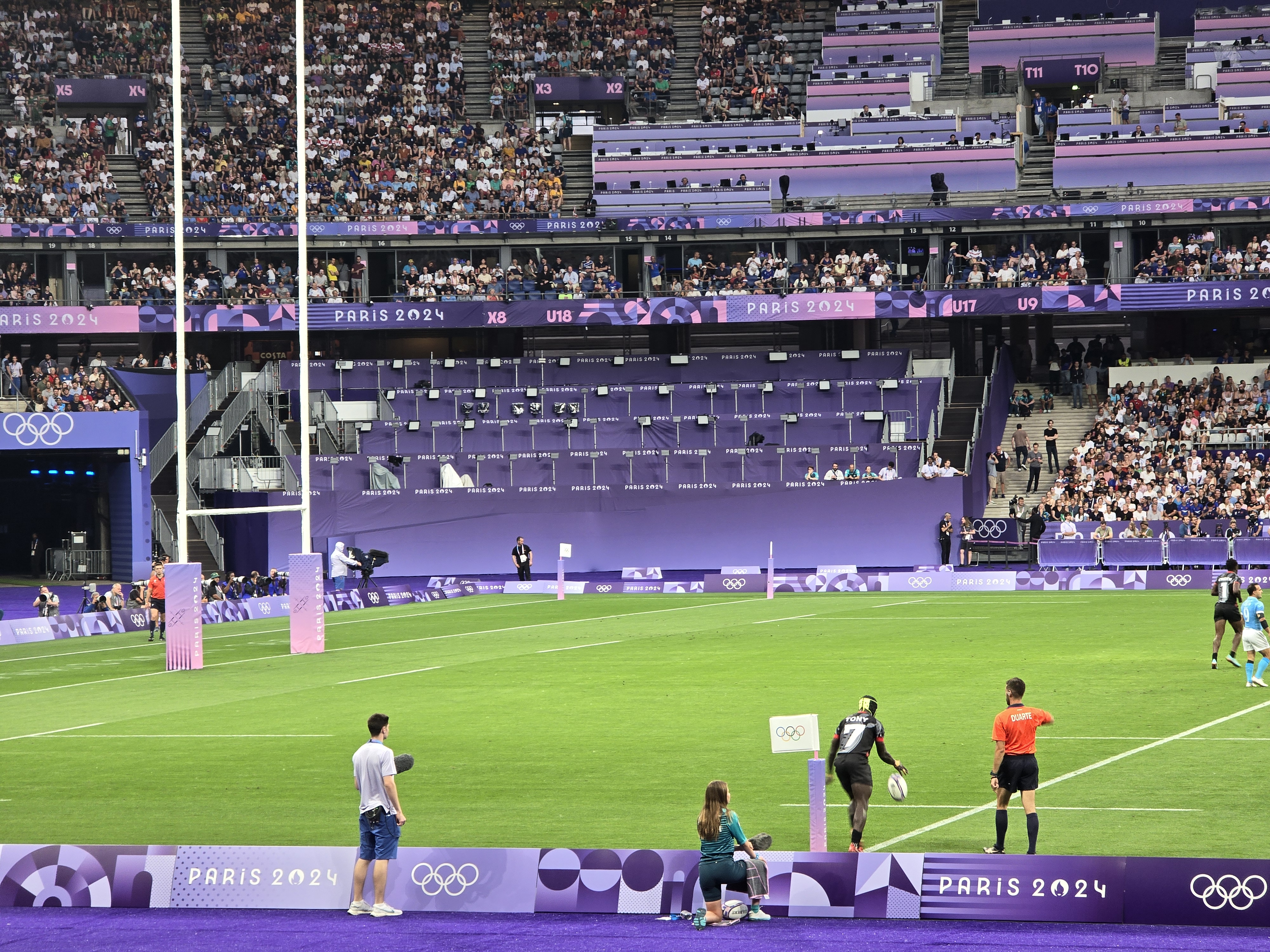
Kenya conversion against Uruguay

25 July 2024
20:30

Uruguay	14–19	Kenya
Try: Tafernaberry 1' c Amaya 16' c Con: Tafernaberry (1/1) 1'; Lijtenstein (1/1) 16'	World Rugby	Try: Okoth 10' c Asati 12' c Okong'o 18'; Con: Mboya (2/2) 11', 12'

Stade de France, Paris
Attendance: 70,000
Referee: Paulo Duarte (Portugal)

Eleventh place match

27 July 2024
16:30

Japan	10–21	Uruguay
Try: Ishida 6' m Tsuoka 11' m	World Rugby	Try: González (2) 1' c, 4' c Viñals 2' c Con: Tafernaberry (3/3) 1', 3', 4'

Stade de France, Paris
Referee: Morné Ferreira (South Africa)

== Sailing ==
Uruguayan sailors qualified one boat in each of the following classes through the 2023 Pan American Games in Santiago, Chile, and 2024 ILCA 6 World Championships in Mar del Plata, Argentina.

Medal race events

Athlete	Event	Race													Net points	Final rank
Athlete	Event	1	2	3	4	5	6	7	8	9	10	11	12	M*	Net points	Final rank
Dolores Moreira	Women's ILCA 6	24	27	9	25	10	~~28~~	9	28	25	—			EL	157	22
Hernán Umpierre; Fernando Diz	Men's 49er	5	2	14	2	17	13	~~18~~	9	4	8	13	7	16	110	10

M = Medal race; EL = Eliminated – did not advance into the medal race

== Swimming ==
Uruguay sent two swimmers to compete at the 2024 Paris Olympics.

Athlete	Event	Heat		Semifinal		Final	
Athlete	Event	Time	Rank	Time	Rank	Time	Rank
Leo Nolles	Men's 100 m freestyle	50.58	47	Did not advance			
Nicole Frank	Women's 200 m medley	2:18.00	30	Did not advance			

== Taekwondo ==
Uruguay qualified one athlete to compete at the 2024 Olympic Games. María Sara Grippoli secured her spot through the 2024 Pan American Qualification Tournament, in Santo Domingo, Dominican Republic.

Athlete	Event	Qualification	Round of 16	Quarterfinals	Semifinals	Repechage	Final / BM	
Athlete	Event	Opposition Result	Opposition Result	Opposition Result	Opposition Result	Opposition Result	Opposition Result	Rank
María Sara Grippoli	Women's –49 kg	Bye	Cerezo (ESP); L 4–11, 0–7	Did not advance				
