= Samoa at the 2024 Summer Olympics =

- IOC code: SAM
- NOC: Samoa Association of Sports and National Olympic Committee Inc.
- Website: www.sasnoc.com

in Paris, France 26 July 2024 – 11 August 2024
- Competitors: 24 (20 men and 4 women) in 9 sports
- Flag bearers: Don Opeloge & Iuniarra Sipaia
- Medals: Gold 0 Silver 0 Bronze 0 Total 0

Summer Olympics appearances (overview)
- 1984; 1988; 1992; 1996; 2000; 2004; 2008; 2012; 2016; 2020; 2024; 2028

Samoa competed at the 2024 Summer Olympics in Paris from 26 July to 11 August 2024. It was the nation's eleventh consecutive appearance at the Summer Olympic Games, for four of which it competed under the name Western Samoa.

== Competitors ==
The following is the list of number of competitors in the Games.

Sport	Men	Women	Total
Athletics	1	0	1
Boxing	1	0	1
Canoeing	1	1	2
Judo	1	0	1
Rugby sevens	12	0	12
Sailing	1	1	2
Swimming	1	1	2
Weightlifting	1	1	2
Wrestling	1	0	1
Total	20	4	24

== Athletics ==
Samoan track and field athletes achieved the entry standards for Paris 2024, either by passing the direct qualifying mark (or time for track and road races) or by world ranking, in the following events (a maximum of three athletes each):

Key

- Note–Ranks given for track events are within the athlete's heat only
- Q = Qualified for the next round
- q = Qualified for the next round as a fastest loser or, in field events, by position without achieving the qualifying target
- NR = National record
- N/A = Round not applicable for the event
- Bye = Athlete not required to compete in round

Field events

Athlete	Event	Qualification		Final	
Athlete	Event	Distance	Position	Distance	Position
Alex Rose	Men's discus throw	62.88	12	61.89	12

== Boxing ==
Samoa entered one boxer into the Olympic tournament. Tokyo 2020 Olympian Ato Plodzicki-Faoagali secured one spot in the heavyweight division, following his gold medal win at the 2023 Pacific Games in Honiara, Solomon Islands.

On 26 July, the team's coach, Lionel Elika Fatupaito, died at the Olympic Village.

Athlete	Event	Round of 16	Quarterfinals	Semifinals	Final	
Athlete	Event	Opposition Result	Opposition Result	Opposition Result	Opposition Result	Rank
Ato Plodzicki-Faoagali	Men's 92 kg	Schelstraete (BEL); L 0–5	Did not advance			

=== Lionel Elika Fatupaito ===
Lionel Elika Fatupaito (1964 – July 26, 2024) was a Samoan boxing coach during the Games. He coached Ato Plodzicki-Faoagali. Fatupaito died from a cardiac arrest on July 26, 2024, hours before the opening ceremony at the 2024 Summer Olympics. He was 60.

The International Boxing Association, gave their condolences to his family, friends and his colleagues. The Oceania National Olympic Committees and the Samoa Association of Sports and National Olympic Committee also expressed their sadness over Fatupaito's death. Ato Plodzicki-Faoagali said that he was saddened about Fatupaito's death in an Instagram post.

== Canoeing ==
=== Sprint ===
Samoan female canoeists qualified two boats for the Games through the result of highest rank eligible nation's, each in the men's K-1 1000 m and women's K-1 500 metres event at the 2024 Oceania Canoe Sprint Qualifier in Penrith, Australia.

Athlete	Event	Heats		Quarterfinals		Semifinals		Final	
Athlete	Event	Time	Rank	Time	Rank	Time	Rank	Time	Rank
Tuva'a Clifton	Men's K-1 1000 m	3:54.49	6	3:55.20	28	Did not advance			
Samalulu Clifton	Women's K-1 500 m	2:02.12	7	1:59.64	37	Did not advance			

Qualification Legend: FA = Qualify to final (medal); FB = Qualify to final B (non-medal)

== Judo ==
Samoa qualified one judoka for the following weight class at the Games. William Tai Tin (men's lightweight, 73 kg) was qualified via continental quota based on Olympic point rankings.

Athlete	Event	Round of 64	Round of 32	Round of 16	Quarterfinals	Semifinals	Repechage	Final / BM	
Athlete	Event	Opposition Result	Opposition Result	Opposition Result	Opposition Result	Opposition Result	Opposition Result	Opposition Result	Rank
William Tai Tin	Men's −73 kg	Bye	A.T. Mlugu (TAN); L 10-01	Did not advance					

== Rugby sevens ==
Summary

Team	Event	Pool round				Classification	Classification	
Team	Event	Opposition Result	Opposition Result	Opposition Result	Rank	Opposition Result	Opposition Result	Rank
Samoa	Men's tournament	Australia; L 14–21	Argentina; L 12–28	Kenya; W 26–0	3	Japan; W 42–7	Kenya; L 5–10	10

=== Men's tournament ===
The Samoa national rugby sevens team qualified for the Olympics by securing the second place at the 2023 Oceania Sevens Championship; marking the nation's debut in this sport at the Olympics.

Team roster

Samoa's squad of 12 players was finalized on 18 July 2024. Additionally, Paul Eti Slater and Malakesi Masefau were named as traveling reserves.

Head coach: Brian Lima

No.	Player	Date of birth (age)
1	Vaovasa Afa Su'a	11 October 1991 (aged 32)
2	Alamanda Motuga	11 September 1994 (aged 29)
3	BJ Telefoni Lima	23 July 1999 (aged 25)
4	Motu Opetai	20 June 2001 (aged 23)
5	Tom Maiava	6 March 1999 (aged 25)
6	Taunu'u Niulevaea	21 January 2000 (aged 24)
7	Lalomilo Lalomilo	12 February 1999 (aged 25)
8	Neueli Leitufia	24 October 2001 (aged 22)
9	Fa'afoi Falaniko	14 March 2002 (aged 22)
10	Paul Scanlan	9 August 1996 (aged 27)
11	Steve Onosai	19 September 2001 (aged 22)
12	Va'a Apelu Maliko (c)	10 November 1998 (aged 25)

Group stage

Pos	Team	Pld	W	D	L	PF	PA	PD	Pts	Qualification
1	Australia	3	3	0	0	64	35	+29	9	Advance to Quarter-finals
2	Argentina	3	2	0	1	73	46	+27	7	Advance to Quarter-finals
3	Samoa	3	1	0	2	52	49	+3	5	
4	Kenya	3	0	0	3	19	78	−59	3	

Source: World Rugby
Rules for classification: 1) Points; 2) Head-to-head result; 3) Point difference; 4) Points scored.

24 July 2024
15:30

Australia	21–14	Samoa
Try: Hutchison (2) 8' c, 14' c Lawson 11' c Con: Roache (3/3) 8', 11', 14'	World Rugby	Try: Opetai 3' c Falaniko 15' c Con: Scanlan (1/1) 3'; Maiava (1/1) 15'

Stade de France, Paris
Attendance: 69,000
Referee: Jérémy Rozier (France)

24 July 2024
19:30

Argentina	28–12	Samoa
Try: Osadczuk (2) 2' c, 9' c Graziano 5' c Pellandini 7' c Con: Pellandini (4/4) 2', 6', 8', 9'	World Rugby	Try: Apelu Maliko 11' c Leitufia 14' m Con: Leitufia (1/2) 11'

Stade de France, Paris
Attendance: 69,000
Referee: Francisco González (Uruguay)

25 July 2024
14:00

Samoa	26–0	Kenya
Try: Opetai 3' m Scanlan 8' c Apelu Maliko 14' c Onosai 16' c Con: Falaniko (1/2) 9'; Maiava (1/1) 14'; Leitufia (1/1) 17'	World Rugby

Stade de France, Paris
Attendance: 70,000
Referee: Reuben Keane (Australia)

Ranking of third-placed teams

Pos	Grp	Team	Pld	W	D	L	PF	PA	PD	Pts	Qualification
1	C	United States	3	1	1	1	57	67	−10	6	Advance to Quarter-finals
2	A	South Africa	3	1	0	2	59	32	+27	5	Advance to Quarter-finals
3	B	Samoa	3	1	0	2	52	49	+3	5	

Source: World Rugby
Rules for classification: 1) Points; 2) Point difference; 3) Points scored.

9–12th place playoff semi-final

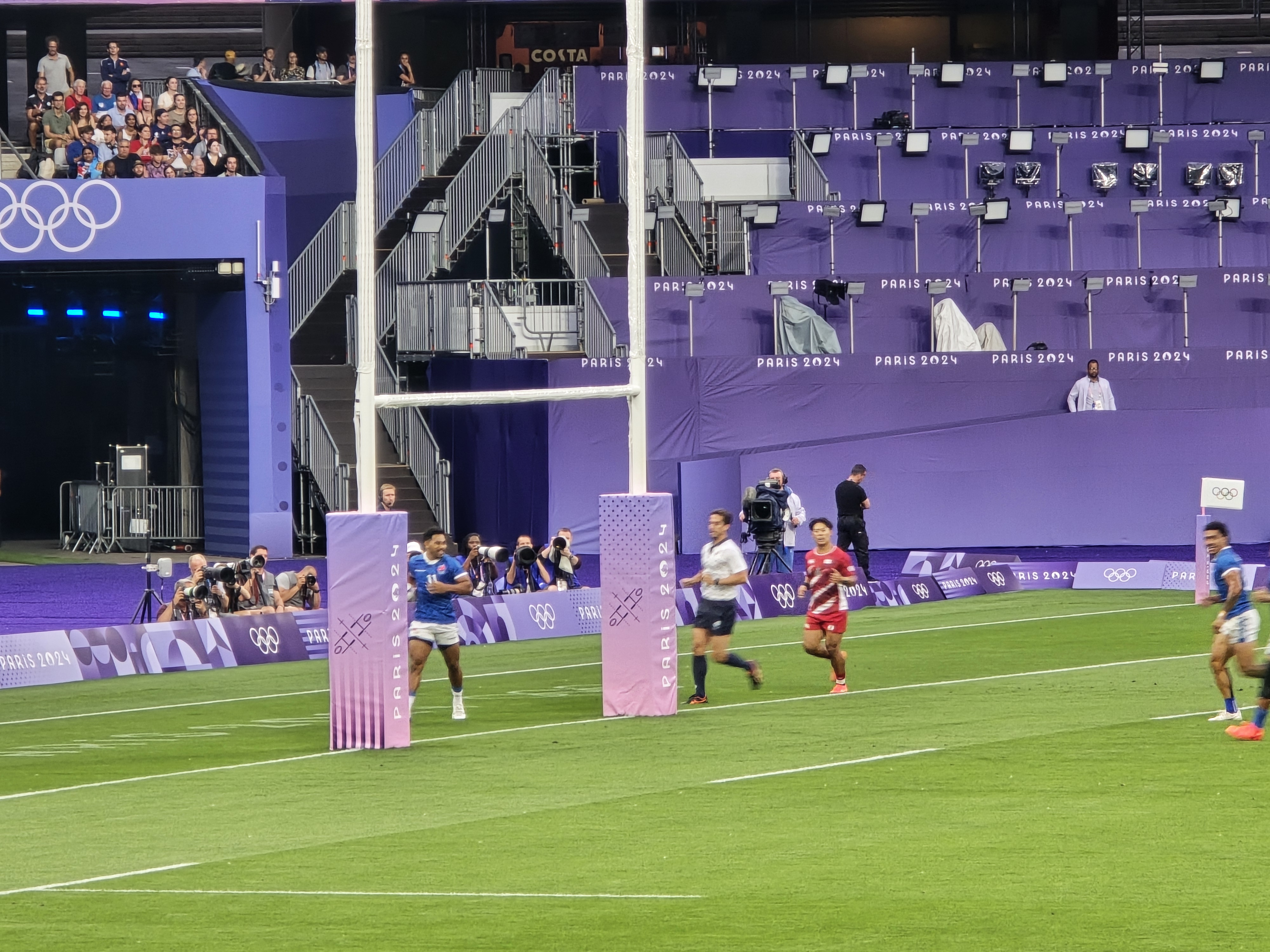
Samoa try against Japan

25 July 2024
20:00

Samoa	42–7	Japan
Try: Scanlan (2) 1' c, 3' c Apelu Maliko 9' c Leitufia 10' c Maiava 12' c Lalomilo 14' c Con: Leitufia (2/2) 1', 4'; Scanlan (2/2) 9', 11'; Maiava (1/1) 12'; Apelu Maliko 15'	World Rugby	Try: Noguchi 8' c Con: Taninaka (1/1) 9'

Stade de France, Paris
Attendance: 70,000
Referee: Gianluca Gnecchi (Italy)

Ninth place match

27 July 2024
17:00

Samoa	5–10	Kenya
Try: Opetai 11' m	World Rugby	Try: Okeyo (2) 3' m, 8' m

Stade de France, Paris
Referee: Tevita Rokovereni (Fiji)

== Sailing ==
Samoa qualified two sailors to compete at the games. Eroni Leilua qualified one boat in the men's ILCA 7 classes through the 2023 Sail Sydney in Sydney, Australia. Later, the nations receiving the allocations of Universality placed in the women's ILCA 6.

Medal race events

Athlete	Event	Race																Net points	Final rank
Athlete	Event	1	2	3	4	5	6	7	8	9	10	11	12	13	14	15	M*	Net points	Final rank
Eroni Leilua	Men's ILCA 7	42	41	~~43~~	42	39	39	31	40	—N/a							—N/a	274	42
Vaimooia Ripley	Women's ILCA 6	42	41	43	40	38	39	~~44~~	39	43	—N/a						—N/a	325	43

M = Medal race; EL = Eliminated – did not advance into the medal race

== Swimming ==
Samoa sent two swimmers to compete at the 2024 Paris Olympics.

Athlete	Event	Heat		Semifinal		Final	
Athlete	Event	Time	Rank	Time	Rank	Time	Rank
Johann Stickland	Men's 100 m freestyle	52.94	66	Did not advance			
Kaiya Brown	Women's 50 m freestyle	28.31	48	Did not advance			

== Weightlifting ==
For the first time since 2016, Samoa entered two weightlifters into the Olympic competition. Don Opeloge (men's 102 kg) and Iuniarra Sipaia (women's +81 kg) secured one of the top ten slots in their respective weight divisions based on the IWF Olympic Qualification Rankings.

Athlete	Event	Snatch		Clean & Jerk		Total	Rank
Athlete	Event	Result	Rank	Result	Rank	Total	Rank
Don Opeloge	Men's −102 kg	~~170~~	DNF	—	—	—	DNF
Iuniarra Sipaia	Women's +81 kg	105	12	141	9	246	11

== Wrestling ==
For the first time since 2000, Samoa qualified one wrestler into the Olympic competition. Gaku Akazawa qualified for the games after winning the semifinal round at the 2024 African & Oceania Olympic Qualification Tournament in Alexandria, Egypt.

Key:

- VT (ranking points: 5–0 or 0–5) – Victory by fall.
- VB (ranking points: 5–0 or 0–5) – Victory by injury (VF for forfeit, VA for withdrawal or disqualification)
- PP (ranking points: 3–1 or 1–3) – Decision by points – the loser with technical points.
- PO (ranking points: 3–0 or 0–3) – Decision by points – the loser without technical points.
- ST (ranking points: 4–0 or 0–4) – Great superiority – the loser without technical points and a margin of victory of at least 8 (Greco-Roman) or 10 (freestyle) points.
- SP (ranking points: 4–1 or 1–4) – Technical superiority – the loser with technical points and a margin of victory of at least 8 (Greco-Roman) or 10 (freestyle) points.

Freestyle

Athlete	Event	Round of 16	Quarterfinal	Semifinal	Repechage	Final / BM	
Athlete	Event	Opposition Result	Opposition Result	Opposition Result	Opposition Result	Opposition Result	Rank
Gaku Akazawa	Men's −65 kg	Dudaev (ALB); L 10–0	Did not advance				14
