= Denis Abukuse =

Kenyan rugby sevens player

- Born: 4 February 1999 (age 27)
- Height: 189 cm (6 ft 2 in)
- Weight: 92 kg (203 lb; 14 st 7 lb)

Rugby union career
National sevens team
| Years | Team | Comps |
| 2022–Present | Kenya | |

Denis Abukuse (born 4 February 1999) is a Kenyan rugby sevens player. He represented Kenya at the 2024 Summer Olympics in Paris. He was originally named as a traveling reserve but featured in the ninth place playoff against Samoa.
