= Adam Channel =

American rugby player

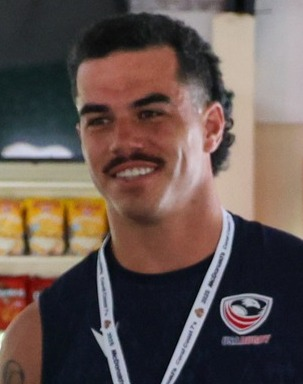
- Born: January 16, 1997 (age 29)
- Height: 6 ft 9 in (205 cm)
- Weight: 209 lb (95 kg)

Rugby union career
National sevens team
Years	Team	Comps
- United States

Adam Channel (born January 16, 1997) is an American rugby sevens player. He was originally named as a traveling reserve for the United States at the 2024 Summer Olympics in Paris, but was later called up to the squad.
