= Lamech Ambetsa =

Kenyan rugby sevens player

- Full name: Lamech Ambetsa Kokoyo
- Born: 27 January 2000 (age 26) Butere, Kenya
- Height: 168 cm (5 ft 6 in)
- Weight: 81 kg (179 lb; 12 st 11 lb)

Rugby union career
National sevens team
Years	Team	Comps
2024–	Kenya	

Lamech Ambetsa Kokoyo (born 27 January 2000) is a Kenyan rugby sevens player. He competed for Kenya at the 2024 Summer Olympics in Paris.
