= Tiaan Pretorius =

South African rugby player (born 2001)

- Full name: Christiaan Pretorius
- Born: 19 February 2001 (age 25)
- School: Paul Roos Gymnasium
- Notable relative: Kwagga Smith (uncle)

Rugby union career
- Position: Prop / Hooker
- Current team: South Africa
National sevens team
Years	Team	Comps
2021–	South Africa Sevens	7
- Correct as of 12 December 2025
Medal record
Men's rugby sevens
Representing South Africa
Olympic Games
Bronze medal – third place	2024 Paris	Team competition

Christiaan "Tiaan" Pretorius (born 19 February 2001) is a South African rugby union player. He plays for the South Africa national rugby sevens team.

== Career ==
He played for Paul Roos Gymnasium and represented Western Province and SA Schools. He received his first call up to the South Africa national rugby sevens team in Dubai in 2021. In Rugby sevens, he is able to play hooker or loose head.

After missing some time through injury, he was recalled back into the South African sevens team in December 2023. In July 2024, he was selected for the 2024 Paris Olympics.

== Personal life ==
He has shared his thoughts on men's fashion for Men's Health (magazine). He is the nephew of Kwagga Smith.
