= Nygel Amaitsa =

Kenyan rugby sevens player (born 2002)

- Full name: Nygel Pettersan Amaitsa
- Born: 26 May 2002 (age 24)
- Height: 186 cm (6 ft 1 in)
- Weight: 82 kg (181 lb; 12 st 13 lb)

Rugby union career
Senior career
Years	Team	Apps	(Points)
2026	Delhi Redz		
National sevens team
Years	Team		Comps
–Present	Kenya		

Nygel Pettersan Amaitsa (born 26 May 2002) is a Kenyan rugby sevens player. He competed for Kenya at the 2024 Summer Olympics in Paris.
