= Tony Omondi =

Kenyan rugby sevens player (born 1995)

- Born: 26 March 1995 (age 31)
- Height: 175 cm (5 ft 9 in)
- Weight: 89 kg (196 lb; 14 st 0 lb)

Rugby union career
National sevens team
Years	Team	Comps
- Kenya

Tony Omondi (born 26 March 1995) is a Kenyan rugby sevens player. He was named as co-captain of the Kenyan sevens team at the 2024 Summer Olympics in Paris.
