= BJ Telefoni Lima =

Samoan rugby sevens player

- Born: 23 July 1999 (age 27)
- Height: 190 cm (6 ft 3 in)
- Weight: 92 kg (203 lb; 14 st 7 lb)
- Notable relative: Brian Lima (father)

Rugby union career
National sevens team
Years	Team	Comps
2023–Present	Samoa	

BJ Telefoni Lima (born 23 July 1999) is a Samoan rugby sevens player.

== Rugby career ==
Lima made his international sevens debut during the Sydney leg of the 2022–23 Sevens Series. He competed for Samoa at the 2024 Summer Olympics in Paris.

== Personal life ==
His father, Brian Lima, represented Samoa at five Rugby World Cups.
