= Vaovasa Afa Su'a =

Samoan rugby sevens player

- Born: 11 October 1991 (age 35)
- Height: 177 cm (5 ft 10 in)
- Weight: 93 kg (205 lb; 14 st 9 lb)

Rugby union career
National sevens team
Years	Team	Comps
2020–Present	Samoa	

Vaovasa Afa Su'a (born 11 October 1991) is a Samoan rugby sevens player. He competed for Samoa at the 2024 Summer Olympics in Paris.
