= Andy Timo =

French rugby union player (born 2004)

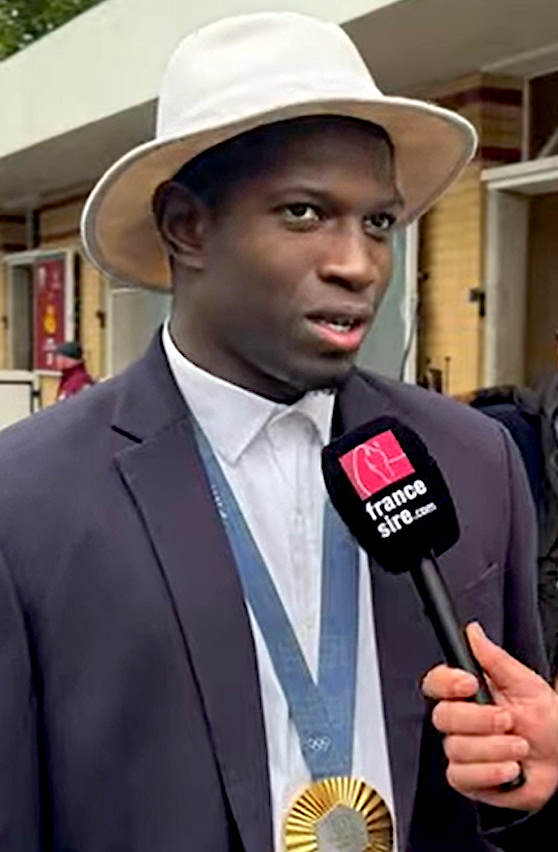
- Timo in 2024
- Born: 28 May 2004 (age 22)
- Height: 1.92 m (6 ft 4 in)
- Weight: 95 kg (209 lb)

Rugby union career
- Position: Flanker
- Current team: La Rochelle
Senior career
Years	Team	Apps	(Points)
2022-2023	RC Massy		
2023–2026	Stade Français	3	(5)
2026–	La Rochelle	7	(5)
- Correct as of 25 October 2026
International career
Years	Team	Apps	(Points)
2023	France U20	4	(5)
National sevens team
Years	Team		Comps
2023–	France		
Medal record
Men's rugby sevens
Representing France
Olympic Games
Gold medal – first place	2024 Paris	Team competition

Andy Timo (born 28 May 2004) is a French rugby union player who currently plays for Top 14 side La Rochelle. He played for France national rugby sevens team at the 2024 Paris Olympics.

== Early life ==
Timo grew up in Massy in the Île-de-France region. During his youth, played judo and football before playing rugby union at school.

== Career ==
He played for RC Massy, making his debut on against Biarritz on November 18, 2022 in the Pro D2. He joined Stade Français in 2023. That year, he made his debut for the France national rugby sevens team at the SVNS World Series tournament in Toulouse. He played for the France U20 side that won the 2023 World Rugby U20 Championship.

He made his debut for Stade Francais on January 13, 2024, in the Rugby Champions Cup against Leinster Rugby.

He was named in the team of the tournament as France 7s won the 2024 USA Sevens in Los Angeles in March 2024, beating Great Britain in the final for their first international tournament win for 19 years.

In July 2024, he was confirmed in the French team for the 2024 Paris Olympics. He scored a try to help France reach the semi-finals of the tournament.

== Personal life ==
His family has origins in Martinique.
