= Moses Leo =

New Zealand rugby union player and league player

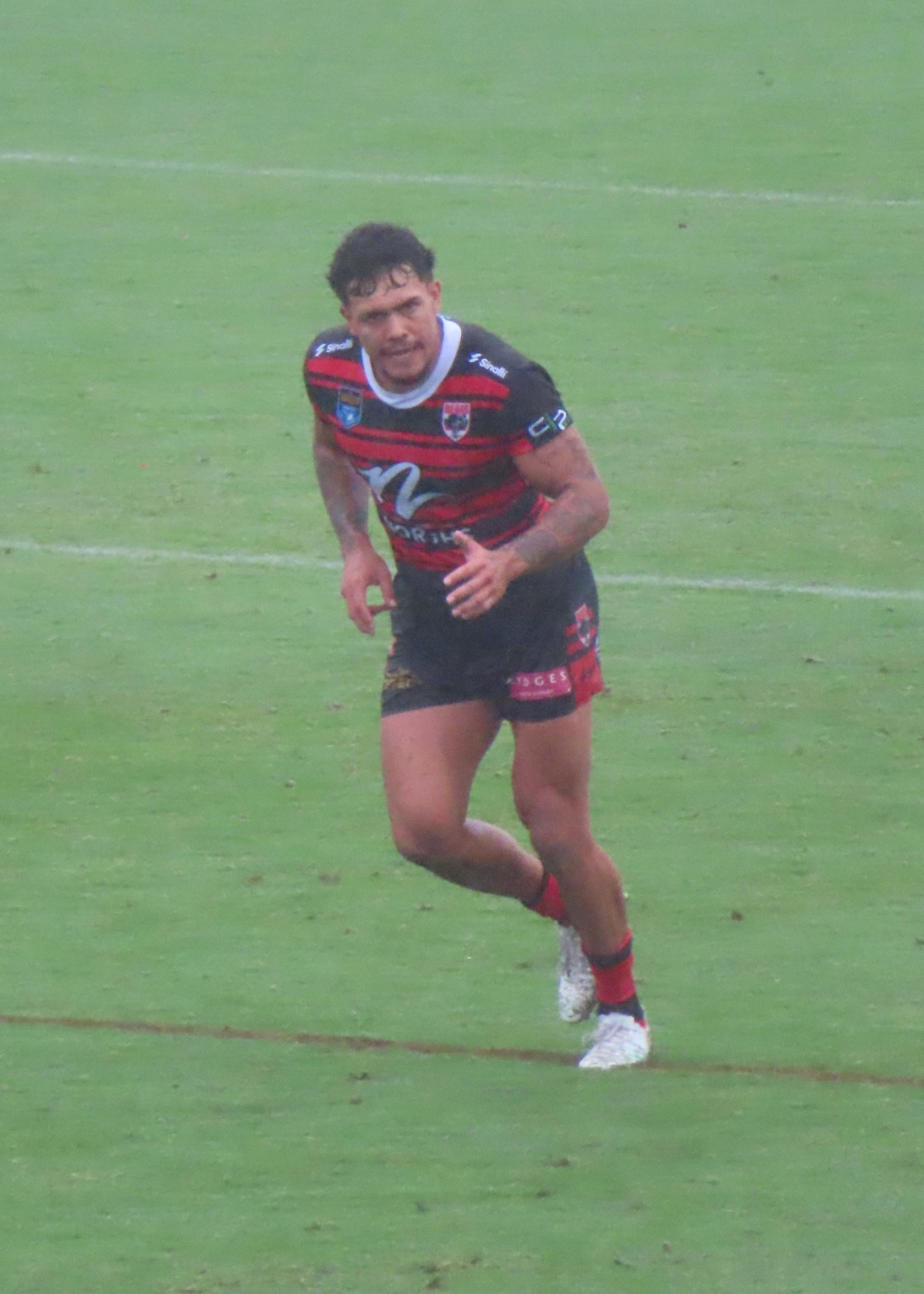
- Born: 11 August 1997 (age 29) Auckland, New Zealand
- Height: 186 cm (6 ft 1 in)
- Weight: 96 kg (15 st 2 lb)
- School: Westlake Boys High School

Rugby union career
- Position: Wing
Senior career
Years	Team	Apps	(Points)
2021–2024	North Harbour	18	(45)
- Correct as of 19 November 2024
National sevens team
Years	Team		Comps
2022–2024	New Zealand		
- Correct as of 21 July 2024
- Rugby league career

Playing information
- Position: Centre
Club
Years	Team	Pld	T	G	FG	P
2025–	Melbourne Storm	19	11	0	0	44
- Source: RLP As of 5 September 2026
Medal record
Men's rugby sevens
Representing New Zealand
Commonwealth Games
Bronze medal – third place	2022 Birmingham	Team competition
Rugby World Cup Sevens
Silver medal – second place	2022 Cape Town	Team competition

Moses Leo (born 11 August 1997) is a New Zealand rugby league footballer who plays for the Melbourne Storm in the National Rugby League (NRL).

He formerly played professional rugby union for National Provincial Championship club North Harbour and the New Zealand national sevens team.

== International career ==
Leo was named in the All Blacks Sevens squad for the 2022 Commonwealth Games in Birmingham. He won a bronze medal at the event. He made the squad for the Rugby World Cup Sevens in Cape Town and won a silver medal after his side lost to Fiji in the gold medal final.

In 2024, Leo represented New Zealand at the Paris Olympics.

== Rugby league career ==
On 20 September 2024, it was announced Leo had signed a two-year contract with NRL side Melbourne Storm from 2026 onward. On 19 November 2024, it was announced New Zealand Rugby had granted Leo an early release from his contract, and the Storm announced his contract would now commence in 2025.

Leo made his senior rugby league debut playing at centre for the North Sydney Bears (who are affiliated with the Melbourne Storm) in a NSW Cup match against the St. George Illawarra Dragons on 29 March 2025. He was a surprise selection for the Melbourne outfit a week later, making his first grade debut for Melbourne in their 48–24 win over the Manly Warringah Sea Eagles at 4 Pines Park.

On 17 September 2026, Melbourne announced that Leo had extended his contract until the end of 2029. Leo played 17 games for Melbourne in the 2026 NRL season as the club finished 10th on the table, missing the finals for the first time since 2010.
