= Taiga Ishida =

Japanese rugby sevens player

- Born: 1 October 1997 (age 29)
- Height: 176 cm (5 ft 9 in)
- Weight: 88 kg (194 lb; 13 st 12 lb)

Rugby union career
- Position(s): Fullback, Wing, Centre
- Current team: Urayasu D-Rocks
Senior career
Years	Team	Apps	(Points)
2020-	NTT Communications Shining Arcs	9	(5)
National sevens team
Years	Team		Comps
2021–	Japan 7s		24

Taiga Ishida (born 1 October 1997) is a Japanese rugby sevens player. He competed for Japan at the 2024 Summer Olympics in Paris.
