= Tristan Leyds =

South African rugby union player

- Born: 24 May 1997 (age 29) Somerset West, South Africa
- Height: 1.79 m (5 ft 10 1/2 in)
- Weight: 68 kg (150 lb)
- School: Bishop's College
- Notable relative: Dillyn Leyds (brother)

Rugby union career
- Position: Wing / Fullback
- Current team: South Africa Sevens
Senior career
Years	Team	Apps	(Points)
2018–2024	Western Province	34	(73)
2020	Stormers	1	(0)
2026	Mumbai Dreamers		
- Correct as of 28 July 2026
International career
Years	Team	Apps	(Points)
2024–	South Africa Sevens		
- Correct as of 28 July 2026
Medal record
Men's rugby sevens
Representing South Africa
Olympic Games
Bronze medal – third place	2024 Paris	Team competition

Tristan Leyds (born 24 May 1997) is a South African rugby union player for the South Africa national rugby sevens team. His regular position is wing or fullback. He made his sevens debut at the 2024 Perth Sevens.

Leyds was named in the Stormers squad for the Super Rugby Unlocked campaign. He made his sevens debut at the 2024 Perth Sevens. He made his debut for Western Province in Round 3 of the 2020 Currie Cup Premier Division against Pumas.

He competed for South Africa at the 2024 Summer Olympics in Paris. They defeated Australia to win the bronze medal final.
