= Valentin Grille =

- Born: 15 June 1998 (age 28)
- Height: 188 cm (6 ft 2 in)
- Weight: 85 kg (187 lb; 13 st 5 lb)

Rugby union career
National sevens team
Years	Team	Comps
2018–Present	Uruguay	

Valentin Grille (born 15 June 1998) is a Uruguayan rugby sevens player. He competed for Uruguay at the 2024 Summer Olympics in Paris.
