= Shilton van Wyk =

- Born: 22 December 1999 (age 26) Bloemfontein, South Africa
- Height: 1.75 m (5 ft 9 in)
- Weight: 74 kg (163 lb)

Rugby union career
- Position: Utility back
- Current team: South Africa Sevens
Senior career
Years	Team	Apps	(Points)
2026	Bengaluru Bravehearts		
International career
Years	Team	Apps	(Points)
2021-	South Africa Sevens		
Medal record
Men's rugby sevens
Representing South Africa
Olympic Games
Bronze medal – third place	2024 Paris	Team competition
Africa Men's Sevens
Silver medal – second place	2024 Mauritius	Team competition

Shilton van Wyk (born 22 December 1999) is a South African rugby union player, playing with the South Africa national rugby sevens team.

== International rugby career ==
Van Wyk debuted for the Blitzboks in 2022 at the Dubai tournament. He competed for South Africa at the 2024 Summer Olympics in Paris. They defeated Australia to win the bronze medal final.
