= Jordan Sepho =

French rugby union player (born 1998)

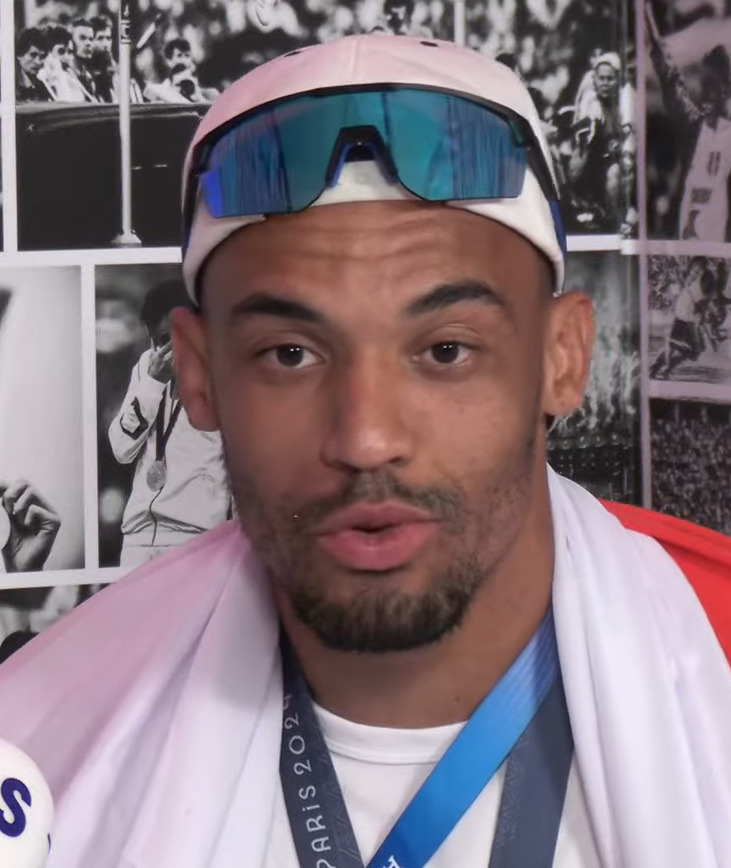
- Sepho in 2024
- Full name: Jordan Dom Sépho
- Born: 8 December 1998 (age 27) Pontoise, France
- Height: 1.94 m (6 ft 4 in)
- Weight: 100 kg (220 lb)

Rugby union career
- Position: Inside centre
Senior career
Years	Team	Apps	(Points)
- Étang-Salé
International career
Years	Team	Apps	(Points)
- Réunion
National sevens team
Years	Team		Comps
- France
Medal record
Men's rugby sevens
Representing France
Olympic Games
Gold medal – first place	2024 Paris	Team competition

Jordan Dom Sépho (born 8 December 1998) is a French rugby union player who competes for the France national rugby sevens team. He competed at the 2024 Summer Olympics and helped France win the gold medal.

== Biography ==
Sepho was born on 8 December 1998 in Pontoise, France. He grew up on the island of Réunion in the Indian Ocean, having moved there age three. As he grew up, he tried out multiple sports, including basketball, wrestling and football. At age 17, he tried out rugby union for the first time, joining the local club Étang-Salé.

A rugby union inside centre, Sepho stands at 194 cm (6 ft 4 1/2 in) and weighs 105 kilograms (231 lb). He helped the Étang-Salé club win an Indian Ocean tournament and soon after was named to the Réunion national rugby union team. In 2019, he competed at a tournament in Épernay, France, for the Réunion team and scored eight tries, drawing the attention of French scouts. He was offered an opportunity with the French Development team and moved back to the country to join them.

In 2020, Sepho was promoted to the France national rugby sevens team. He made his debut for the national team at the 2020 HSBC World Rugby Sevens Series, although he stated that "During my first match, I vomited from stress." He began "shining" with the national team during the 2021/22 season, playing 11 matches with eight tries scored during two tournaments in Dubai.

Sepho was an important member of the French team that won the 2023–24 SVNS over Argentina. He was later chosen to compete at the 2024 Summer Olympics, where he helped France beat Fiji to win the gold medal.
