= Orrin Bizer =

American rugby player

Personal information
- Born: December 13, 2000 (age 25)
- Home town: The Woodlands, Texas, U.S.
- Height: 6 ft 2 in (189 cm)
- Weight: 214 lb (97 kg)

Rugby union career
National sevens team
Years	Team	Comps
- United States

Orrin Bizer (born December 13, 2000) is an American rugby sevens player. He competed for the United States at the 2024 Summer Olympics in Paris.
