= Fa'afoi Falaniko =

Samoan rugby sevens player

- Born: 14 March 2002 (age 24)
- Height: 176 cm (5 ft 9 in)
- Weight: 94 kg (207 lb; 14 st 11 lb)

Rugby union career
National sevens team
Years	Team	Comps
2020–Present	Samoa	

Fa'afoi Falaniko (born 14 March 2002) is a Samoan rugby sevens player. He competed for Samoa at the 2024 Summer Olympics in Paris.
