= Dante Soto =

- Full name: Dante Soto Inda
- Born: 2 June 2003 (age 23) Paysandú, Uruguay
- Height: 178 cm (5 ft 10 in)
- Weight: 80 kg (176 lb; 12 st 8 lb)

Rugby union career
Senior career
| Years | Team | Apps | (Points) |
- Peñarol
National sevens team
| Years | Team | | Comps |
- Uruguay

Dante Soto Inda (Note: In this Spanish name, the first or paternal surname is Soto and the second or maternal family name is Inda.) (born 2 June 2003) is a Uruguayan rugby union player, currently playing for Súper Liga Americana de Rugby side Peñarol. He competed for the Uruguay national rugby sevens team at the 2024 Summer Olympics in Paris.
