= Chrisant Ojwang =

Kenyan rugby sevens player

- Born: 15 December 1998 (age 27)
- Height: 186 cm (6 ft 1 in)
- Weight: 85 kg (187 lb; 13 st 5 lb)

Rugby union career
National sevens team
Years	Team	Comps
- Kenya

Chrisant Ojwang (born 15 December 1998) is a Kenyan rugby sevens player. He competed for Kenya at the 2024 Summer Olympics in Paris.
