= Tomás Elizalde =

Argentine rugby sevens player

- Full name: Tomás María Elizalde
- Born: 18 November 2002 (age 23) Salta, Argentina
- Height: 182 cm (6 ft 0 in)
- Weight: 90 kg (198 lb; 14 st 2 lb)

Rugby union career
National sevens team
Years	Team	Comps
2021–Present	Argentina	

Tomás María Elizalde (born 18 November 2002) is an Argentine rugby sevens player. He represented Argentina at the 2024 Summer Olympics in Paris.
