= Taunu'u Niulevaea =

Samoan rugby sevens player

- Born: 21 January 2000 (age 26)
- Height: 189 cm (6 ft 2 in)
- Weight: 106 kg (234 lb; 16 st 10 lb)

Rugby union career
National sevens team
Years	Team	Comps
2022–Present	Samoa	

Taunu'u Niulevaea (born 21 January 2000) is a Samoan rugby sevens player.

Niulevaea made his international debut for Samoa during the 2022 USA Sevens in Los Angeles. He competed for Samoa at the 2024 Summer Olympics in Paris.
