= Selestino Ravutaumada =

Fijian rugby union & league player

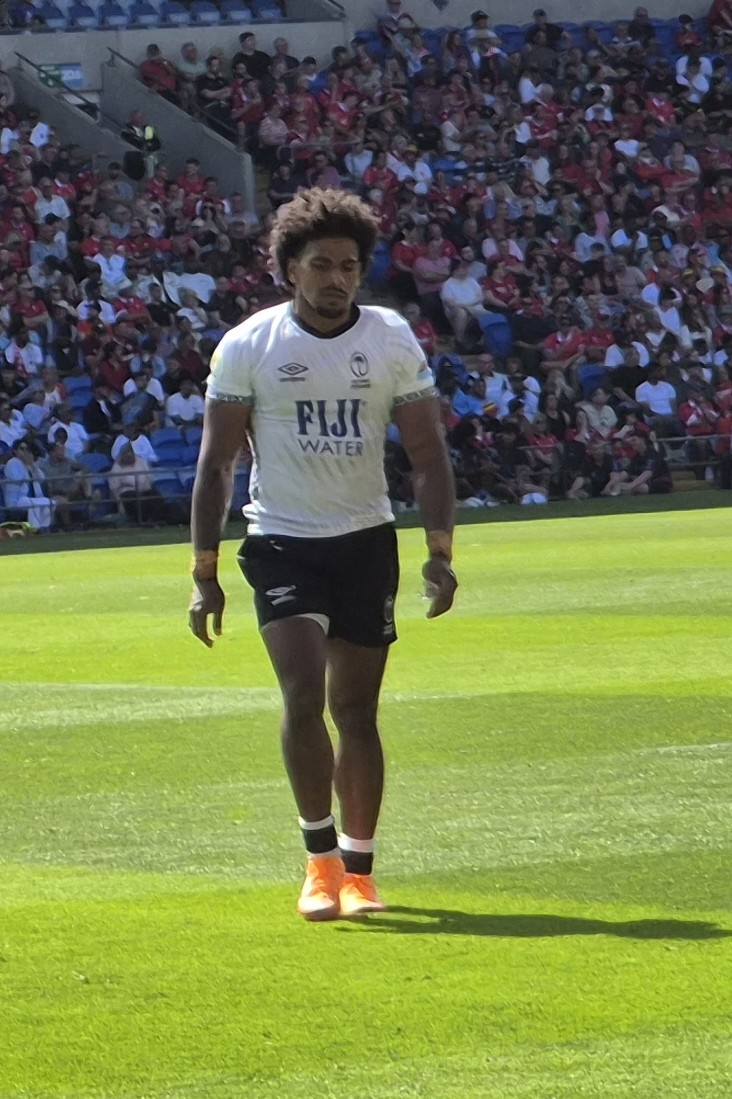
- 2026 Nations Championship in Cardiff, Wales
- Born: 30 December 1999 (age 26) Taveuni, Fiji
- Height: 183 cm (6 ft 0 in)
- Weight: 93 kg (205 lb; 14 st 9 lb)
- School: Rotorua Boys' High School

Rugby union career
- Position(s): Wing, Fullback
- Current team: Fijian Drua
Youth career
- 2014-15: Marist Brothers
- 2016-2018: Rotorua
Senior career
Years	Team	Apps	(Points)
2022–2025	Fijian Drua	47	(60)
2025-	Racing 92		
- Correct as of 25 July 2025
International career
Years	Team	Apps	(Points)
2023-	Fiji	0	(0)
- Rugby league career

Playing information
Club
Years	Team	Pld	T	G	FG	P
2020	New Zealand Warriors
Representative
Years	Team	Pld	T	G	FG	P
2019	Junior Kiwis
2019	Fiji 9s	3				4
Medal record
Men's rugby sevens
Representing Fiji
Olympic Games
Silver medal – second place	2024 Paris	Team competition

Selestino Ravutaumada (born 30 December 1999) is a Fijian rugby union player for the Drua. His preferred position is wing or fullback. He signed for French Top 14 club, Racing 92 for the 2025-26 Top 14 season.

== Professional career ==
=== Rugby Union ===
Ravutaumada was named in the Fijian Drua squad for the 2022 Super Rugby Pacific season. He made his debut for the Drua in Round 1 of the 2022 Super Rugby Pacific season against the Waratahs.

He was part of the Fijian side that won a silver medal at the 2024 Summer Olympics in Paris.

=== Rugby League ===
In 2019, he played for the Junior Kiwis against the Junior Kangaroos.
