= Iowane Teba =

Fiji rugby sevens player (b. 1993)

- Born: 23 February 1993 (age 33)
- Height: 1.92 m (6 ft 4 in)
- Weight: 79 kg (174 lb)

Rugby union career
Senior career
Years	Team	Apps	(Points)
2025–	Bengaluru Bravehearts		
National sevens team
Years	Team		Comps
2021-	Fiji 7s		
Medal record
Men's rugby sevens
Representing Fiji
Olympic Games
Silver medal – second place	2024 Paris	Team competition

Iowane Teba (born 23 February 1993) is a Fijian rugby union player. He played at the 2024 Paris Olympics.

== Career ==
A Nukubalavu native from Savusavu, he made his international debut for the Fiji national rugby sevens team in 2021 at the Dubai 7s. He featured for Fiji at the Hong Kong sevens in April 2023.

After recovering from injuries he was selected to play for Fiji at the SVNS world series event in Singapore in April 2024.

He was subsequently selected for the 2024 Paris Olympics. He was part of the Fijian team which reached the semi-finals of the men's rugby sevens tournament.
