= Tom Maiava =

Samoan rugby union player

- Born: 6 March 1999 (age 27)
- Height: 176 cm (5 ft 9 in)
- Weight: 90 kg (198 lb; 14 st 2 lb)
- School: Bishop Viard College, Wellington College

Rugby union career
National sevens team
Years	Team	Comps
2023–Present	Samoa	

Tom Maiava (born 6 March 1999) is a Samoan rugby sevens player.

Maiava debuted for Samoa at the 2023 Pacific Games in Honiara, Solomon Islands, he won a silver medal at the event. He competed for Samoa at the 2024 Summer Olympics in Paris.
