= Shotaro Tsuoka =

Japan international rugby union player

- Born: 22 March 1996 (age 30)
- Height: 181 cm (5 ft 11 in)
- Weight: 85 kg (187 lb; 13 st 5 lb)

Rugby union career
- Position: Wing
Senior career
Years	Team	Apps	(Points)
2018–2021	Coca-Cola Red Sparks	5	(15)
2026	Kolkata Banga Tigers		
National sevens team
Years	Team		Comps
2019–Present	Japan		32

Shotaro Tsuoka (born 22 March 1996) is a Japanese rugby sevens player. He competed for Japan at the 2024 Summer Olympics in Paris.
