= Juan Gonzalez (rugby union) =

Uruguay international rugby union player

- Born: Juan Gonzalez; 12 April 2003 (age 23)
- Height: 1.80 m (5 ft 11 in)
- Weight: 87 kg (192 lb)

Rugby union career
- Position: Fullback/Wing
- Current team: Worcester Warriors
Senior career
Years	Team	Apps	(Points)
2023–2024	Peñarol	1	(0)
2025-	Worcester Warriors	16	(25)
- Correct as of 31 May 2025
International career
Years	Team	Apps	(Points)
2025–	Uruguay	13	(25)
- Correct as of 19 July 2025
National sevens team
Years	Team		Comps
2024–2026	Uruguay		

Juan Gonzalez (born 12 April 2003) is a Uruguayan rugby sevens player. He competed for Uruguay at the 2024 Summer Olympics in Paris.

In May 2025, it was announced that Gonzalez had signed for Worcester Warriors to play in Champ Rugby from the 2025–26 season.
