= Samuel Asati =

Kenyan rugby sevens player

Samuel Asati OLY
- Born: 14 March 1999 (age 27)
- Height: 172 cm (5 ft 8 in)
- Weight: 80 kg (176 lb; 12 st 8 lb)

Rugby union career
Senior career
Years	Team	Apps	(Points)
2026	Delhi Redz		
National sevens team
Years	Team		Comps
2023–Present	Kenya		

Samuel Asati OLY (born 14 March 1999) who studied in Cardinal Otunga Highschool Mosocho from 2013 to 2016 is a Kenyan rugby sevens player. He represented Kenya at the 2024 Summer Olympics in Paris.
