= Jefferson-Lee Joseph =

French rugby union player (born 2002)

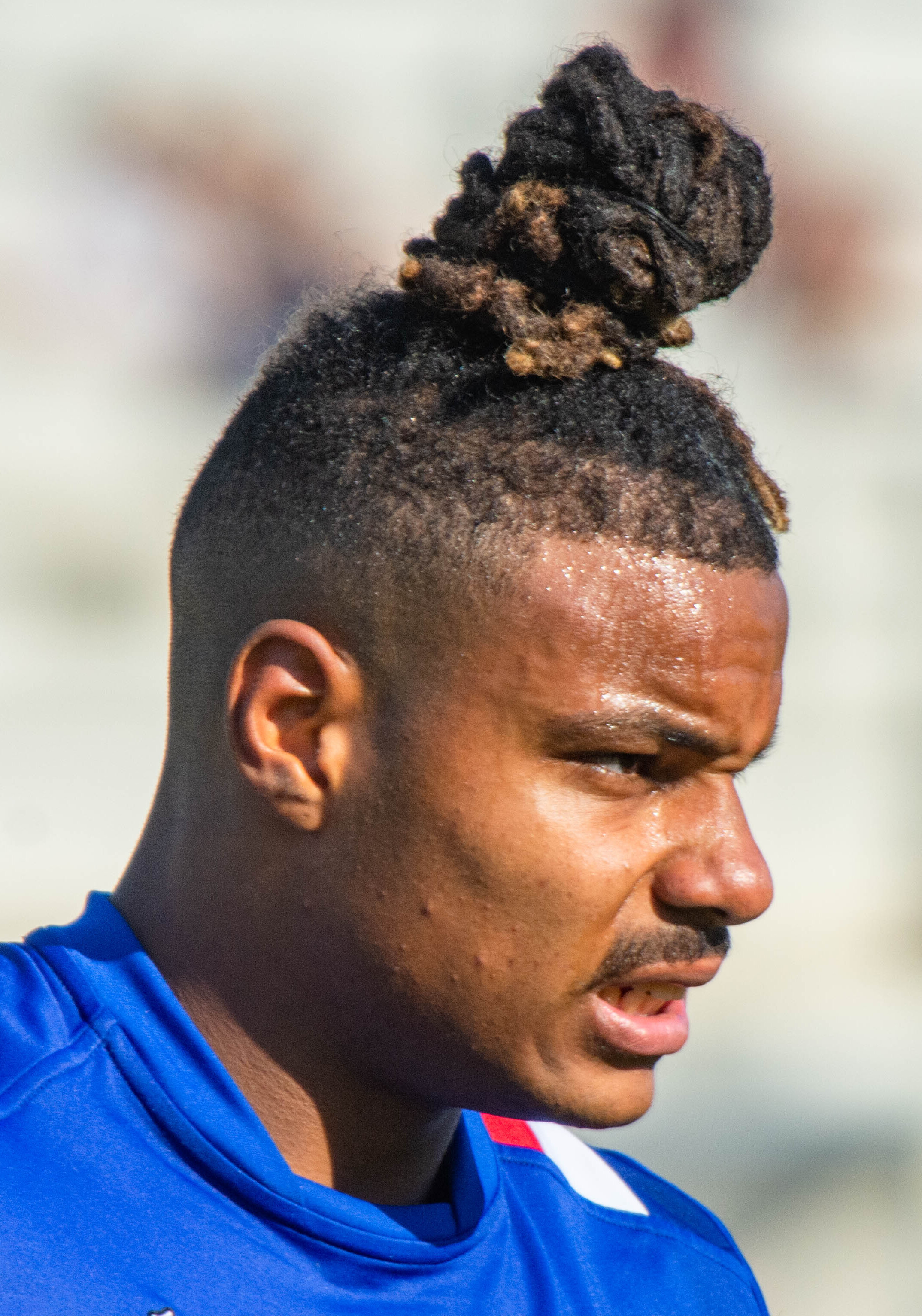
- Joseph in 2022
- Born: 29 August 2002 (age 24) Baie-Mahault, Guadeloupe
- Height: 1.91 m (6 ft 3 in)
- Weight: 89 kg (196 lb)

Rugby union career
- Position: Wing
Senior career
Years	Team	Apps	(Points)
2022-	Agen		
National sevens team
Years	Team		Comps
2023-	France 7s		
Medal record
Men's rugby sevens
Representing France
Olympic Games
Gold medal – first place	2024 Paris	Team competition

Jefferson-Lee Joseph (born 29 August 2002) is a French rugby union player. He plays as a wing for SU Agen Lot-et-Garonne and the France national rugby sevens team.

== Career ==
He is from Duras, in Lot-et-Garonne. A 15-a side player at SU Agen where he plays on the wing having made a try-scoring debut for the club in 2022 as an 18 year-old away against Oyonnax Rugby. He signed a two-year contract with the club in February 2023. However, he was made available to the France national rugby sevens team in September 2023 in preparation for a home Olympics the following year.

He played as France 7s won the 2024 USA Sevens in Los Angeles, beating Great Britain in the final for their first international tournament win for 19 years. In June 2024, he scored in the final as France won the 2024 Spain Sevens in Madrid. In July 2024, he was confirmed in the French team for the 2024 Paris Olympics.

== Personal life ==
Born in metropolitan France, Joseph is of Guadeloupean descent.

His father was Jeff Joseph. A famous singer and songwriter from the island of Dominica.

His original band Grammacks are legends of a Caribbean musical genre called "Cadence-lypso" that preceded and heavily influenced "Zouk".
