= Henry Paterson =

- Born: 26 February 1997 (age 29)
- Height: 1.9 m (6 ft 3 in)
- Weight: 95 kg (209 lb)

Rugby union career
National sevens team
Years	Team	Comps
2021 – present	Australia	48 (90)

Henry Paterson (born 26 February 1997) is an Australian rugby sevens player.

== Rugby career ==
Paterson is the son of former Roosters forward and Rothmans Medallist Trevor Paterson. He was set to make his Olympic debut in Tokyo but had to withdraw on the eve of the Games due to injury.

Paterson replaced Jed Stuart in the fourth round of the Sevens World Series in Seville, for the 2022 Spain Sevens. He scored a hat-trick and helped his side win the 2022 London Sevens final against New Zealand.

Paterson competed for the Australian sevens squad at the 2022 Commonwealth Games in Birmingham. He also represented Australia at the Rugby World Cup Sevens in Cape Town.

In 2024, He was named in Australia's squad for the Summer Olympics in Paris. The Australian team came 4th in the Olympics after being beaten by South Africa.
