= Kippei Taninaka =

Japanese rugby sevens player

- Born: 4 June 2000 (age 26)
- Height: 170 cm (5 ft 7 in)
- Weight: 88 kg (194 lb; 13 st 12 lb)

Rugby union career
- Position(s): Fullback, Wing, Scrum-half
- Current team: Toyota Verblitz
Senior career
| Years | Team | Apps | (Points) |
| 2023– | Toyota Verblitz | 0 | (0) |
National sevens team
| Years | Team | | Comps |
| 2023–Present | Japan | | 11 |

Kippei Taninaka (born 4 June 2000) is a Japanese rugby sevens player. He competed for Japan at the 2024 Summer Olympics in Paris.
