= Yoshihiro Noguchi =

Japanese rugby sevens player

- Born: 26 December 1994 (age 31)
- Height: 170 cm (5 ft 7 in)
- Weight: 77 kg (170 lb; 12 st 2 lb)

Rugby union career
- Position(s): Scrum-half, Wing
- Current team: Secom Rugguts
Senior career
Years	Team	Apps	(Points)
2019-	Secom Rugguts	4	(35)
National sevens team
Years	Team		Comps
2017–Present	Japan		36

Yoshihiro Noguchi (born 26 December 1994) is a Japanese rugby sevens player.

Noguchi made his international sevens debut for Japan at the 2017 Asian Sevens Series in Incheon, South Korea. He competed for Japan at the 2024 Summer Olympics in Paris.
