= Paulo Scanlan =

Samoan footballer and rugby union player

Personal information
- Full name: Paulo Scanlan
- Date of birth: August 9, 1996 (age 30)
- Height: 1.71 m (5 ft 7 in)
- Position: Midfielder

Team information
- Current team: Vaipuna

Youth career
- Samoa Football Academy

Senior career*
Years	Team	Apps	(Gls)
2012–2016	Vaipuna		
2016	Kiwi FC		
2016–	Vaipuna		

International career^{‡}
2013	Samoa U17	2	(3)
2016–	Samoa	3	(0)
Rugby union career
National sevens team
Years	Team	Comps
2019–Present	Samoa	
- * Club domestic league appearances and goals as of 1 June 2016 ‡ National team caps and goals as of 10 June 2016

Paulo Scanlan (also known as Paul Scanlan; born 9 August 1996) is a Samoan professional footballer and rugby union player who has played for the Samoa national football team and Samoa national rugby sevens team.

== Football career ==
Scanlan played football as a midfielder for Vaipuna in the Samoa National League. He made his debut for the national team at the 2016 OFC Nations Cup on May 29, 2016 in their 4–0 loss against Tahiti. In 2019 he played for Vailima Kiwi FC in the 2019 OFC Champions League. In December 2019 he announced he was leaving football to pursue a career in rugby.

== Rugby sevens career ==
In April 2019 he was selected for the Samoa national rugby sevens team to play in the Hong Kong sevens. He subsequently played in Dubai.

In June 2021 he was selected for the 2020 Men's Rugby Sevens Final Olympic Qualification Tournament. In December 2021 he was part of the team for the World Sevens Series.

In July 2022 he was named to the team to represent Samoa at the 2022 Commonwealth Games. He later competed at the Rugby World Cup Sevens in Cape Town.

Scanlan competed for Samoa at the 2024 Summer Olympics in Paris.
