= Baltazar Amaya =

Uruguayan rugby union player (born 1999)

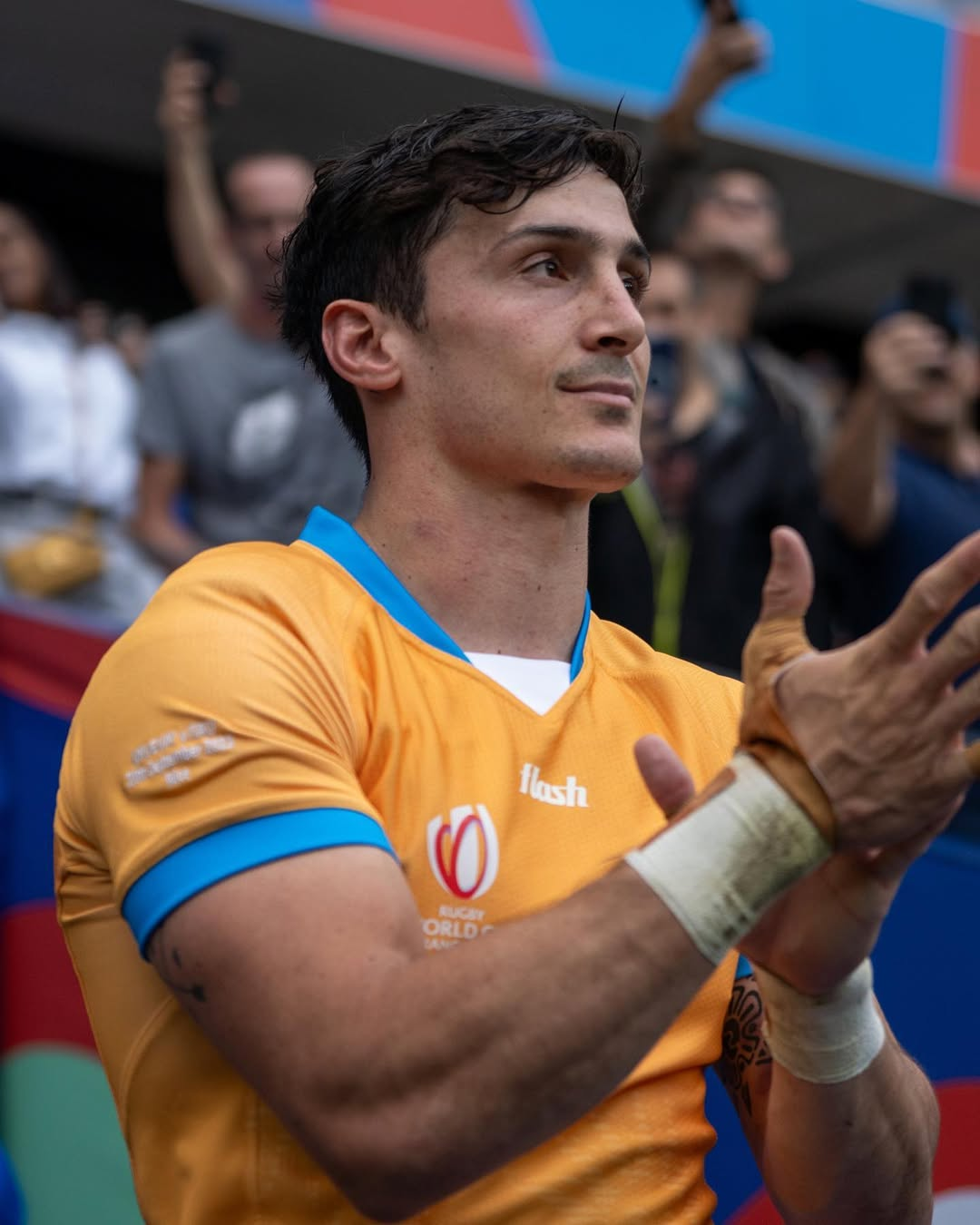
- Full name: Baltazar Amaya Saavedra
- Born: 26 May 1999 (age 27) Buenos Aires, Argentina
- Height: 1.84 m (6 ft 0 in)
- Weight: 91 kg (201 lb)
- School: The British Schools of Montevideo

Rugby union career
- Position: Wing / Fullback
Senior career
Years	Team	Apps	(Points)
2020–	Peñarol	7	(5)
- Correct as of 13 February 2022
International career
Years	Team	Apps	(Points)
2018–2019	Uruguay U20s	6	(30)
2020–	Uruguay XV	5	(5)
2021–	Uruguay	8	(0)
- Correct as of 9 September 2023
National sevens team
Years	Team		Comps
2020	Uruguay Sevens		2
- Correct as of 13 February 2022

Baltazar Amaya Saavedra (born 26 May 1999) is a rugby union player who plays as a wing or fullback for Súper Liga Americana de Rugby side Peñarol. Born in Argentina, he represents Uruguay at international level. He competed for Uruguay at the 2023 Rugby World Cup and for the Uruguayan sevens team at the 2024 Summer Olympics.

== Personal life ==
Amaya was born in Argentina and played at Hindú Club as a child, but his family relocated to Uruguay due to his father's job when he was nine years old. He attended The British Schools of Montevideo. He became a Uruguayan citizen in 2022.

== Rugby career ==
Amaya signed for Súper Liga Americana de Rugby side Peñarol ahead of the 2020 Súper Liga Americana de Rugby season, before re-signing ahead of the 2021 and 2022 seasons. He has also represented the Uruguay national team.

In 2022, Amaya competed for Uruguay at the Rugby World Cup Sevens in Cape Town. In 2023, He played for the Uruguayan fifteens team at the 2023 Rugby World Cup. He scored two tries in his sides win against Namibia at the tournament.

Amaya competed for Uruguay at the 2024 Summer Olympics in Paris.
