= Motu Opetai =

Samoan rugby sevens player

- Born: 20 June 2001 (age 25)
- Height: 182 cm (6 ft 0 in)
- Weight: 91 kg (201 lb; 14 st 5 lb)

Rugby union career
Senior career
Years	Team	Apps	(Points)
2026	Bengaluru Bravehearts		
National sevens team
Years	Team		Comps
2022–Present	Samoa		

Motu Opetai (born 20 June 2001) is a Samoan rugby sevens player.

Opetai made his international sevens debut during the Singapore leg of the 2021–22 Sevens Series. He competed for Samoa at the 2024 Summer Olympics in Paris.
