= Neueli Leitufia =

Samoan rugby sevens player

- Born: 24 October 2001 (age 25)
- Height: 167 cm (5 ft 6 in)
- Weight: 65 kg (143 lb; 10 st 3 lb)

Rugby union career
National sevens team
Years	Team	Comps
2021–Present	Samoa	

Neueli Leitufia (born 24 October 2001) is a Samoan rugby sevens player. He competed for Samoa at the 2024 Summer Olympics in Paris.
