= Antoine Zeghdar =

French rugby union player (born 1999)

- Born: 22 May 1999 (age 27) Monaco
- Height: 1.98 m (6 ft 6 in)
- Weight: 100 kg (220 lb)

Rugby union career
- Position: Centre
- Current team: Castres
Senior career
Years	Team	Apps	(Points)
–2019	Toulon		
2019–2021	Oyonnax		
2021–	Castres		
National sevens team
Years	Team		Comps
2019–	France		
Medal record
Men's rugby sevens
Representing France
Olympic Games
Gold medal – first place	2024 Paris	Team competition

Antoine Zeghdar (born 22 May 1999) is a rugby union player who plays as a centre for Top 14 club Castres. Born in Monaco, he played for France Rugby Sevens at the 2024 Paris Olympics, winning the gold medal.

== Career ==
From Monaco, he started playing rugby at AS Monaco Rugby before joining RC Toulon. He was French junior champion with RC Toulon in 2016 and 2017 and U18 European champion with the French XV team in 2017. He was selected for the France national rugby sevens team in March 2019. In May 2019, he was a member of the Toulon U21 team that won the French Espoirs Championship final against Stade Rochelais U21.

He then played for Oyonnax Rugby, combining 15-a-side play with selection for the France Sevens team. He later joined Castres Olympique.

In March 2024, he played as France 7s won the 2024 USA Sevens in Los Angeles in March 2024, beating Great Britain in the final for their first international tournament win for 19 years. In July 2024, he was confirmed in the French team for the 2024 Paris Olympics.

Playing for France in the 2025-26 SVNS, he played as the team won the 2026 France Sevens in Bordeaux in June 2026, beating New Zealand 14-5 in the final.

== Personal life ==
Zeghdar was born in Monaco to a Monegasque father and French mother.
