= Juan Manuel Tafernaberry =

Uruguayan rugby union player

- Born: Juan Manuel Tafernaberry; May 27, 2002 (age 24) Uruguay

Rugby union career
- Position: Scrum-half
Senior career
Years	Team	Apps	(Points)
2022–	Peñarol		
- Correct as of 13 February 2022
International career
Years	Team	Apps	(Points)
2021–	Uruguay	1	(0)
- Correct as of 13 February 2022

Juan Manuel Tafernaberry (born 27 May 2002) is a Uruguayan rugby union player, currently playing for Súper Liga Americana de Rugby side Peñarol. His preferred position is scrum-half.

== Rugby career ==
Tafernaberry signed for Súper Liga Americana de Rugby side Peñarol ahead of the 2022 Súper Liga Americana de Rugby season. He was previously a member of the Stade Français Academy side. He has also represented the Uruguay national team.

In 2024, He competed for Uruguay at the Summer Olympics in Paris.
