= John Okoth (rugby union) =

Kenyan rugby union player

- Full name: John Okoth Okeyo
- Born: 18 April 2000 (age 26) Nakuru, Kenya
- Height: 190 cm (6 ft 3 in)
- Weight: 105 kg (231 lb)
- School: New Life Africa School

Rugby union career
- Position: Centre
- Current team: Menengai Oilers RFC
Youth career
- 2011-2018: Nakuru RFC
Senior career
Years	Team	Apps	(Points)
2018-20??	Nakuru RFC		
20??-	Menengai Oilers RFC		
2022	Simbas	4	(0)
2026	Delhi Redz		
- Correct as of 25 July 2024
International career
Years	Team	Apps	(Points)
2013	Kenya under-15		
2019	Kenya under-20	4	(0)
2019-	Kenya	10	(25)
- Correct as of 25 July 2024
National sevens team
Years	Team		Comps
2023-	Kenya		
- Correct as of 25 July 2024

John Okoth Okeyo (born 18 April 2000) is a Kenya rugby union player who was named in the Kenya sevens squad for the 2024 Summer Olympics.

== Career ==
=== Club ===
After some pressure from some friends he began to play rugby, joining Nakura RFC. He vice-captained the Nakura RFC 2nd XV in the 2018–19 Eric Shirley Shield season. He layer joined the Menehai Oilers RFC. He played in the 2022 Currie Cup First Division for the Simbas.

=== International ===
He was named in the Kenya under-15 squad for their tour of France in 2013. Although missing the 2019 U20 Barthés Trophy he was named in the Kenya under-20 squad for the 2019 World Rugby Under 20 Trophy. Starting at inside centre in all their games.

He made his debut for the national side in 2019 playing against Uganda in the Elgon Cup. He came runners-up in both the 2019 Victoria Cup and the 2021–22 Rugby Africa Cup. He played in all of Kenya's games in the 2023 RWC Final Qualification Tournament scoring against Hong Kong China.

He began playing for the Kenyan sevens side in 2023, later being named in the squad for the 2024 Summer Olympics.

== Honours ==
=== Kenya ===
- Rugby Africa Cup
  - Runners-up: (2) 2019, 2021–22
- Elgon Cup: (2) 2019, 2023
