= Rugby sevens at the 2024 Summer Olympics – Men's tournament =

2024 Men's Olympic Rugby Sevens Tournament
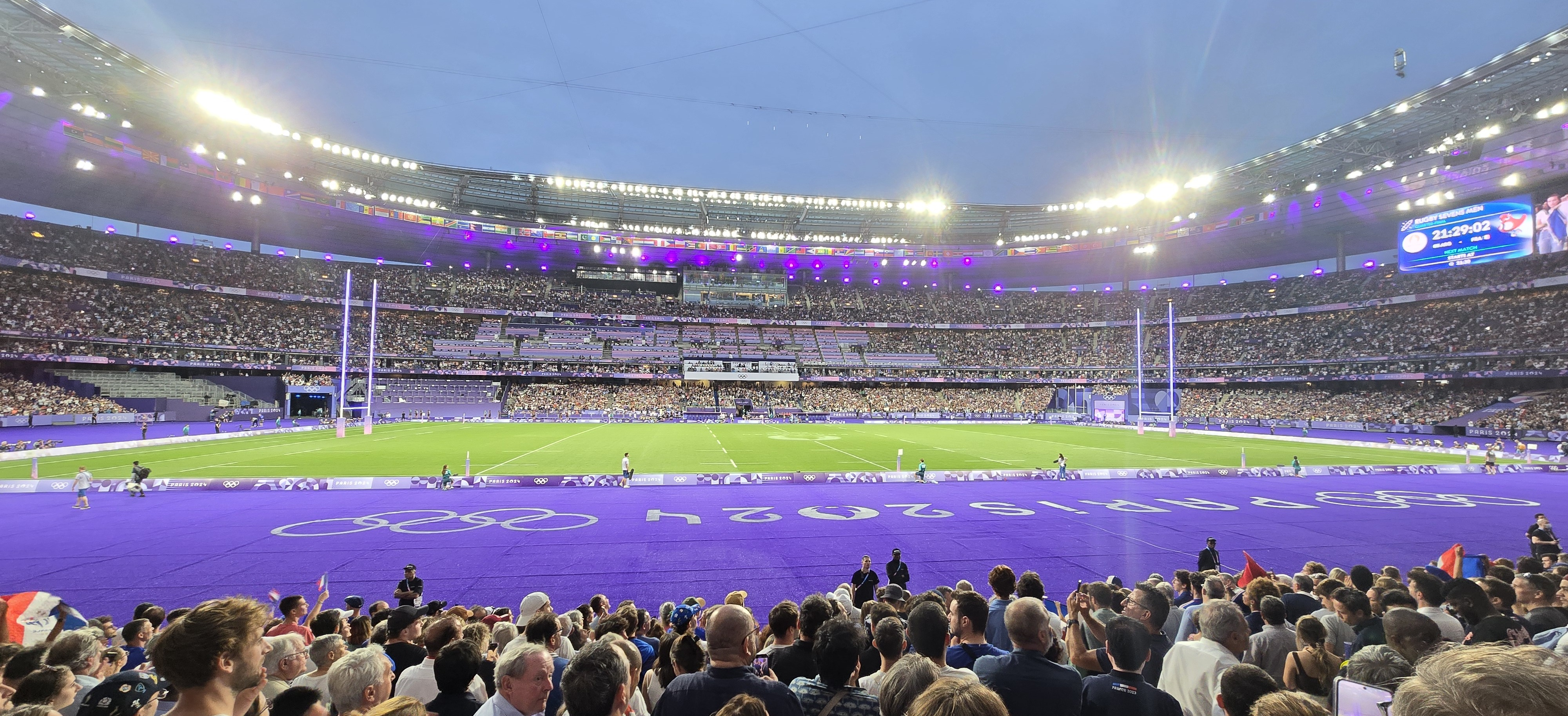
- Stade de France for the Argentina–France quarter-final match

Tournament details
- Host: France
- Venue: Stade de France
- Date: 24–27 July 2024
- Teams: 12

Final positions
- Champions: France (1st title)
- Runner-up: Fiji
- Third place: South Africa
- Fourth place: Australia

Tournament statistics
- Matches played: 24
- Tries scored: 134 (5.58 per match)
- Top scorer(s): (United States) Perry Baker (Fiji) Iowane Teba (30 points each)
- Most tries: (United States) Perry Baker (6 tries)

The men's rugby sevens tournament at the 2024 Summer Olympics was held at Stade de France, which also served as a host stadium of the 2023 Rugby World Cup. The tournament was played over three match days from 24 to 27 July 2024, with no matches on 26 July due to the Olympics opening ceremony. The French hosts defeated reigning champions Fiji in the final to win their first ever Olympic title in the event.

== Competition schedule ==
Legend

P	Pool Stage	PM	Placing Matches	¼	Quarter-Finals	½	Semi-Finals	B	Bronze Medal Match	F	Gold Medal Match

Schedule
Date	24 Jul		25 Jul			26 Jul	27 Jul				
Event	M	E	M	E			M		E		
Men's	P			PM	¼		PM	½	PM	B	F

== Qualification ==
Qualification	Date	Host	Berths	Qualified team
Host nation	13 September 2017	—N/a	1	France
2022–23 World Rugby Sevens Series	4 November 2022 – 21 May 2023	Various	4	New Zealand
2022–23 World Rugby Sevens Series	4 November 2022 – 21 May 2023	Various	4	Argentina
2022–23 World Rugby Sevens Series	4 November 2022 – 21 May 2023	Various	4	Fiji
2022–23 World Rugby Sevens Series	4 November 2022 – 21 May 2023	Various	4	Australia
2023 South American Qualification Tournament	17–18 June 2023	Montevideo	1	Uruguay
2023 European Games	25–27 June 2023	Kraków	1	Ireland
2023 RAN Sevens	19–20 August 2023	Langford	1	United States
2023 Africa Men's Sevens	16–17 September 2023	Harare	1	Kenya
2023 Oceania Sevens Championship	10–12 November 2023	Brisbane	1	Samoa
2023 Asian Qualification Tournament	18–19 November 2023	Osaka	1	Japan
2024 Final Olympic Qualification Tournament	21–23 June 2024	Fontvieille, Monaco	1	South Africa
Total			12	

== Squads and officials ==
=== Squads ===
Each squad can have up to 12 players, as well as two traveling reserves in case of injury.

=== Officials ===
World Rugby announced the 12 referees on 8 May 2024.

- Ben Breakspear (Wales/Great Britain)
- Paulo Duarte (Portugal)
- Gianluca Gnecchi (Italy)
- Francisco González (Uruguay)
- Nick Hogan (New Zealand)
- AJ Jacobs (South Africa)
- Reuben Keane (Australia)
- Adam Leal (England/Great Britain)
- Tevita Rokovereni (Fiji)
- Jérémy Rozier (France)
- Morné Ferreira (South Africa)
- Jordan Way (Australia)

== Group stage ==
=== Group A ===
Pos	Team	Pld	W	D	L	PF	PA	PD	Pts	Qualification
1	New Zealand	3	3	0	0	71	29	+42	9	Advance to Quarter-finals
2	Ireland	3	2	0	1	62	24	+38	7	Advance to Quarter-finals
3	South Africa	3	1	0	2	59	32	+27	5	Advance to Quarter-finals
4	Japan	3	0	0	3	22	129	−107	3	

Source: World Rugby
Rules for classification: 1) Points; 2) Head-to-head result; 3) Point difference; 4) Points scored.

24 July 2024
17:30

Ireland	10–5	South Africa
Try: Conroy 8' m Kennedy 12' m	World Rugby	Try: S. Davids 14' m

Stade de France, Paris
Attendance: 69,000
Referee: Gianluca Gnecchi (Italy)

24 July 2024
18:00

New Zealand	40–12	Japan
Try: Rokolisoa (2) 1' c, 8' c Fineanganofo (2) 4' m, 6' c McGarvey-Black (2) 8' c, 12' c Con: Rokolisoa (4/5) 1', 7', 8', 8'; Knewstubb (1/1) 12'	World Rugby	Try: Tsuoka 2' c Ishida 16' m Con: Taninaka (1/1) 2'

Stade de France, Paris
Attendance: 69,000
Referee: Tevita Rokovereni (Fiji)

24 July 2024
21:00

Ireland	40–5	Japan
Try: Kennedy 1' c Mullins (2) 8' c, 12' c McNulty 8' c Comerford 10' m Ward 15' c Con: Lennox (3/4) 2', 8', 9'; Roche (2/2) 12', 15'	World Rugby	Try: Tsuoka 14' m

Stade de France, Paris
Attendance: 69,000
Referee: Morné Ferreira (South Africa)

24 July 2024
21:30

New Zealand	17–5	South Africa
Try: Leo (2) 2' m, 11' c McGarvey-Black 7' m Con: Rokolisoa (1/1) 12'	World Rugby	Try: S. Davids 4' m

Stade de France, Paris
Attendance: 69,000
Referee: Reuben Keane (Australia)

25 July 2024
16:00

South Africa	49–5	Japan
Try: Z. Davids 1' c Visser 3' c van Wyk (2) 4' c, 14' c Oosthuizen (2) 6' c, 7' c Specman 11' c Con: Leyds (5/5) 2', 3', 4', 6', 8'; Brown (2/2) 12', 14'	World Rugby	Try: Ueda 10' m

Stade de France, Paris
Attendance: 70,000
Referee: Nick Hogan (New Zealand)

25 July 2024
16:30

New Zealand	14–12	Ireland
Try: Carter 8' c McGarvey-Black 14' c Con: Rokolisoa (1/1) 8'; Knewstubb (1/1) 14'	World Rugby	Try: Ward 6' m Conroy 7' m Con: Roche (1/2) 8'

Stade de France, Paris
Attendance: 70,000
Referee: Jordan Way (Australia)

=== Group B ===
Pos	Team	Pld	W	D	L	PF	PA	PD	Pts	Qualification
1	Australia	3	3	0	0	64	35	+29	9	Advance to Quarter-finals
2	Argentina	3	2	0	1	73	46	+27	7	Advance to Quarter-finals
3	Samoa	3	1	0	2	52	49	+3	5	
4	Kenya	3	0	0	3	19	78	−59	3	

Source: World Rugby
Rules for classification: 1) Points; 2) Head-to-head result; 3) Point difference; 4) Points scored.

24 July 2024
15:30

Australia	21–14	Samoa
Try: Hutchison (2) 8' c, 14' c Lawson 11' c Con: Roache (3/3) 8', 11', 14'	World Rugby	Try: Opetai 3' c Falaniko 15' c Con: Scanlan (1/1) 3'; Maiava (1/1) 15'

Stade de France, Paris
Attendance: 69,000
Referee: Jérémy Rozier (France)

24 July 2024
16:00

Argentina	31–12	Kenya
Try: Fraga (2) 7' m, 8' c Elizalde 10' c González 14' c Moneta 15' m Con: Pellandini (2/3) 8', 12'; Mare (1/1) 14'	World Rugby	Try: Ojwang 4' c Wekesa 9' m Con: Mboya (1/2) 5'

Stade de France, Paris
Attendance: 69,000
Referee: AJ Jacobs (South Africa)

24 July 2024
19:00

Australia	21–7	Kenya
Try: Turner 1' c Lawson 6' c Toole 13' c Con: Roache (3/3) 1', 7', 13'	World Rugby	Try: Mboya 3' c Con: Mboya (1/1) 3'

Stade de France, Paris
Attendance: 69,000
Referee: Paulo Duarte (Portugal)

24 July 2024
19:30

Argentina	28–12	Samoa
Try: Osadczuk (2) 2' c, 9' c Graziano 5' c Pellandini 7' c Con: Pellandini (4/4) 2', 6', 8', 9'	World Rugby	Try: Apelu Maliko 11' c Leitufia 14' m Con: Leitufia (1/2) 11'

Stade de France, Paris
Attendance: 69,000
Referee: Francisco González (Uruguay)

25 July 2024
14:00

Samoa	26–0	Kenya
Try: Opetai 3' m Scanlan 8' c Apelu Maliko 14' c Onosai 16' c Con: Falaniko (1/2) 9'; Maiava (1/1) 14'; Leitufia (1/1) 17'	World Rugby

Stade de France, Paris
Attendance: 70,000
Referee: Reuben Keane (Australia)

25 July 2024
14:30

Argentina	14–22	Australia
Try: Schulz 2' c Osadczuk 11' c Con: Pellandini (2/2) 2', 11'	World Rugby	Try: Hutchison 7' m Dowling 8' m Roache 9' m Malouf 13' c Con: Roache (1/4) 13'

Stade de France, Paris
Attendance: 70,000
Referee: Adam Leal (England)

=== Group C ===
Pos	Team	Pld	W	D	L	PF	PA	PD	Pts	Qualification
1	Fiji	3	3	0	0	97	36	+61	9	Advance to Quarter-finals
2	France (H)	3	1	1	1	43	43	0	6	Advance to Quarter-finals
3	United States	3	1	1	1	57	67	−10	6	Advance to Quarter-finals
4	Uruguay	3	0	0	3	41	92	−51	3	

Source: World Rugby
Rules for classification: 1) Points; 2) Head-to-head result; 3) Point difference; 4) Points scored.
(H) Hosts

24 July 2024
16:30

France	12–12	United States
Try: Sepho 4' m Rebbadj 8' c Con: Barraque (1/2) 8'	World Rugby	Try: Lacamp 7' c Tupuola 12' m Con: Tomasin (1/1) 7'

Stade de France, Paris
Attendance: 69,000
Referee: Adam Leal (England/Great Britain)

24 July 2024
17:00

Fiji	40–12	Uruguay
Try: Nasova (2) 2' m, 7' c Loganimasi 5' c Nacuqu 8' c Teba 11' c Ravutaumada 15' c Con: Nacuqu (3/4) 6', 7', 8'; Teba (1/1) 12'; Tamani (1/1) 25'	World Rugby	Try: González 4' c Basso 10' m Con: Lijtenstein (1/1) 4'

Stade de France, Paris
Attendance: 69,000
Referee: Ben Breakspear (Wales/Great Britain)

24 July 2024
20:00

France	19–12	Uruguay
Try: Zeghdar 3' c Dupont 9' m Joseph 12' c Con: Barraque (2/3) 10', 14'	World Rugby	Try: Facciolo 8' c González 10' m Con: Lijtenstein (1/1) 8'

Stade de France, Paris
Attendance: 69,000
Referee: Nick Hogan (New Zealand)

24 July 2024
20:30

Fiji	38–12	United States
Try: Teba 2' m Rasaku 4' c Ravutaumada 5' m Raisuqe 7' m Baleiwairiki 8' m Nacuqu 10' c Con: Teba (4/5) 3', 5', 7', 9'	World Rugby	Try: Bizer 5' c Baker 11' m Con: Hughes (1/1) 12'

Stade de France, Paris
Attendance: 69,000
Referee: Jordan Way (Australia)

25 July 2024
15:00

United States	33–17	Uruguay
Try: Baker (4) 1' c, 8' c, 11' c, 14' m Lacamp 8' c Con: Tomasin (4/5) 1', 9', 9', 11'	World Rugby	Try: Amaya (2) 3' m, 13' m Basso 5' c Con: Lijtenstein (1/2) 6'

Stade de France, Paris
Attendance: 70,000
Referee: Jérémy Rozier (France)

25 July 2024
15:30

Fiji	19–12	France
Try: Tuwai 6' m Rasaku 9' c Nasova 13' c Con: Teba (1/2) 10'; Veilawa (1/1) 14'	World Rugby	Try: Grandidier Nkanang 4' m Timo 15' c Con: Rebbadj (1/1) 16'

Stade de France, Paris
Attendance: 70,000
Referee: AJ Jacobs (South Africa)

=== Ranking of third-placed teams ===
The top two of the third-placed teams advance to the knockout rounds.

Pos	Grp	Team	Pld	W	D	L	PF	PA	PD	Pts	Qualification
1	C	United States	3	1	1	1	57	67	−10	6	Advance to Quarter-finals
2	A	South Africa	3	1	0	2	59	32	+27	5	Advance to Quarter-finals
3	B	Samoa	3	1	0	2	52	49	+3	5	

Source: World Rugby
Rules for classification: 1) Points; 2) Point difference; 3) Points scored.

== Knockout stage ==
=== 9–12th place playoff ===
Semi-finals
25 July – Stade de France
Samoa	42
Japan	7
25 July – Stade de France
Uruguay	14
Kenya	19

9th place match
27 July – Stade de France
Samoa	5
Kenya	10
11th place match
27 July – Stade de France
Japan	10
Uruguay	21

==== 9–12th place semi-finals ====
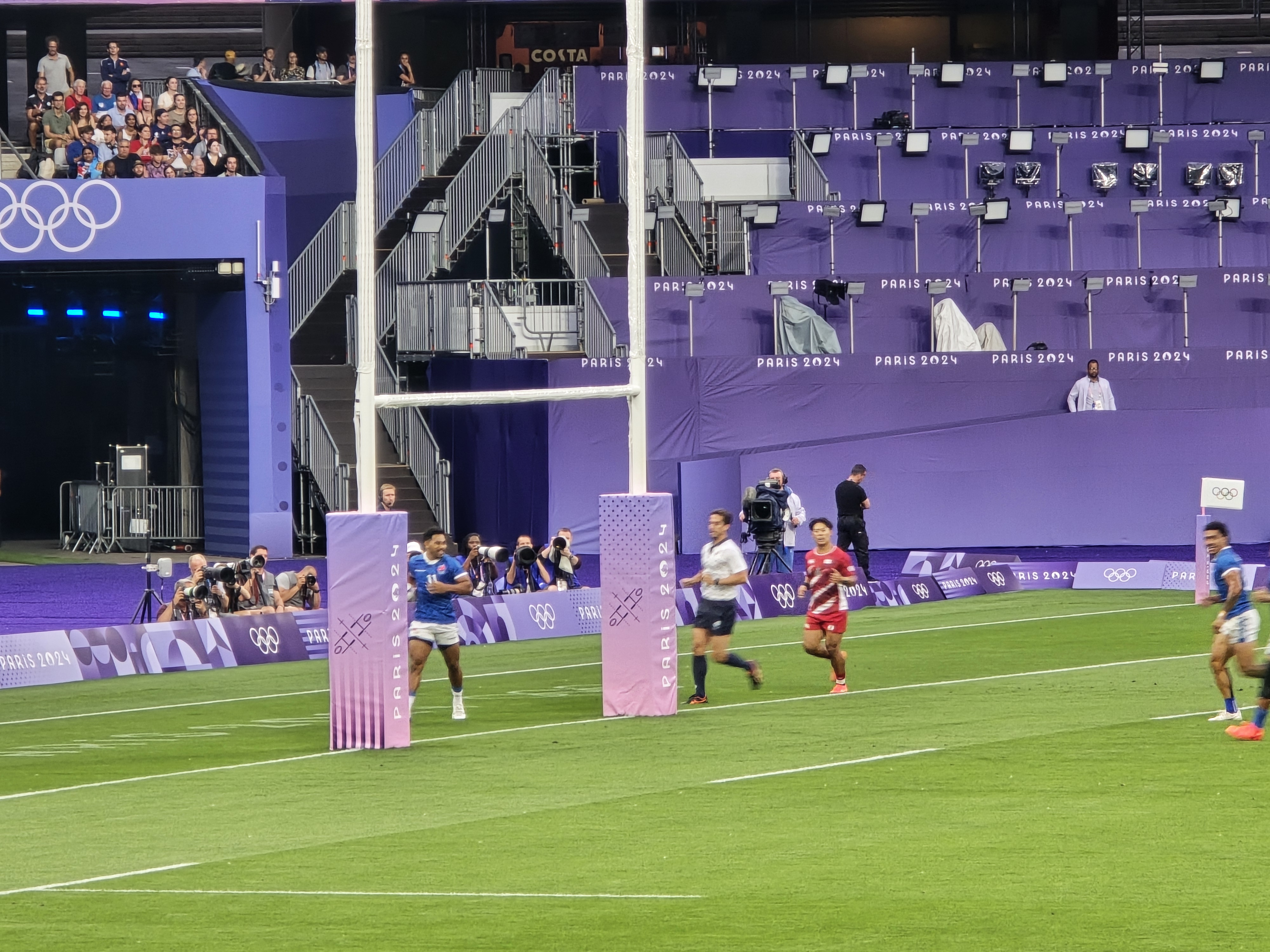
Samoa try against Japan

25 July 2024
20:00

Samoa	42–7	Japan
Try: Scanlan (2) 1' c, 3' c Apelu Maliko 9' c Leitufia 10' c Maiava 12' c Lalomilo 14' c Con: Leitufia (2/2) 1', 4'; Scanlan (2/2) 9', 11'; Maiava (1/1) 12'; Apelu Maliko 15'	World Rugby	Try: Noguchi 8' c Con: Taninaka (1/1) 9'

Stade de France, Paris
Attendance: 70,000
Referee: Gianluca Gnecchi (Italy)

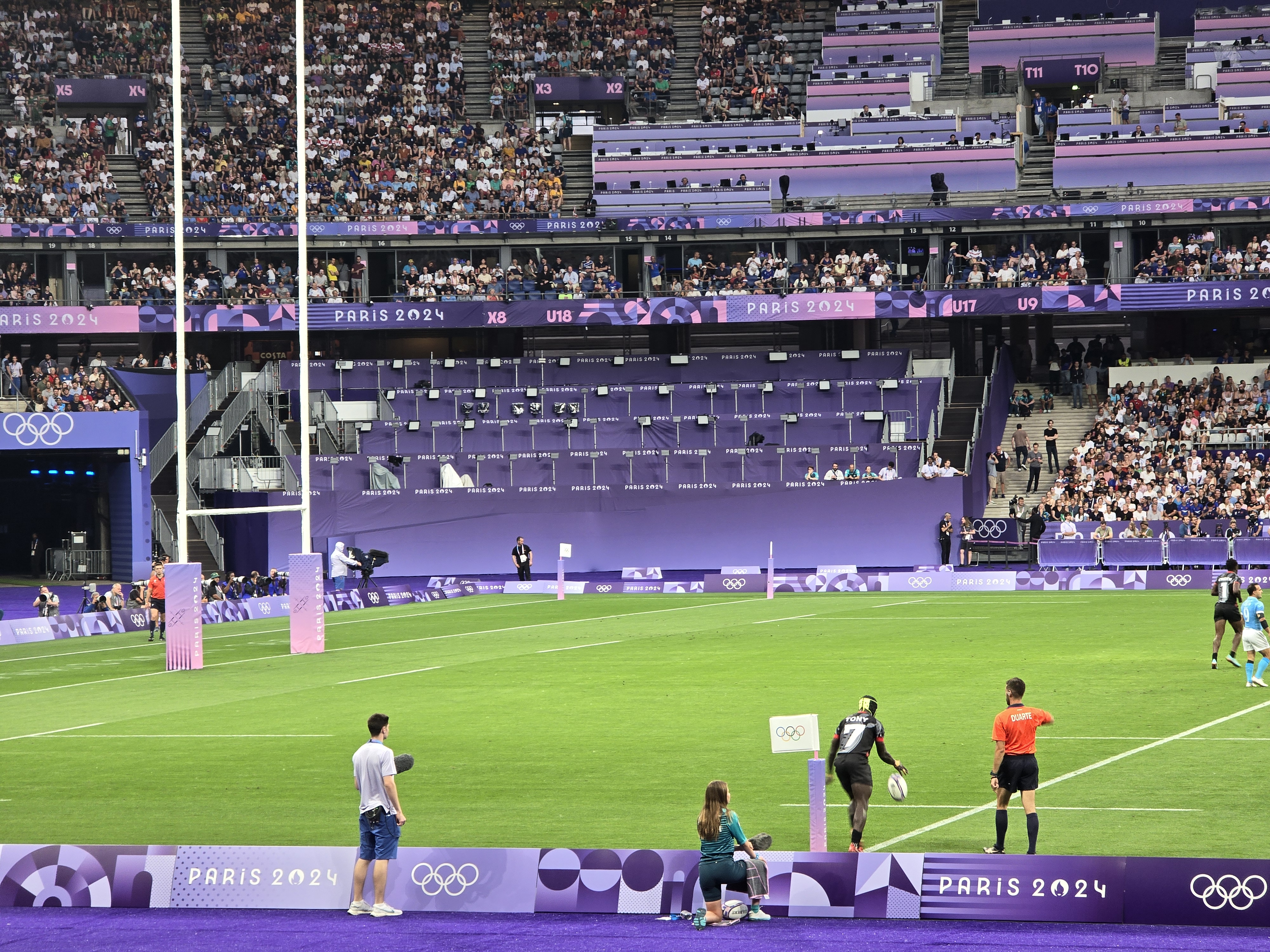
Kenya conversion against Uruguay

25 July 2024
20:30

Uruguay	14–19	Kenya
Try: Tafernaberry 1' c Amaya 16' c Con: Tafernaberry (1/1) 1'; Lijtenstein (1/1) 16'	World Rugby	Try: Okoth 10' c Asati 12' c Okong'o 18'; Con: Mboya (2/2) 11', 12'

Stade de France, Paris
Attendance: 70,000
Referee: Paulo Duarte (Portugal)

==== Eleventh place final ====
27 July 2024
16:30

Japan	10–21	Uruguay
Try: Ishida 6' m Tsuoka 11' m	World Rugby	Try: González (2) 1' c, 4' c Viñals 2' c Con: Tafernaberry (3/3) 1', 3', 4'

Stade de France, Paris
Referee: Morné Ferreira (South Africa)

==== Ninth place final ====
27 July 2024
17:00

Samoa	5–10	Kenya
Try: Opetai 11' m	World Rugby	Try: Okeyo (2) 3' m, 8' m

Stade de France, Paris
Referee: Tevita Rokovereni (Fiji)

=== 5–8th place playoff ===
Semi-finals
27 July – Stade de France
New Zealand	17
Argentina	12
27 July – Stade de France
Ireland	17
United States	14

5th place match
27 July – Stade de France
New Zealand	17
Ireland	7
7th place match
27 July – Stade de France
Argentina	19
United States	0

==== 5–8th place semi-finals ====
27 July 2024
14:30

New Zealand	17–12	Argentina
Try: Rokolisoa 1' c Leo 14' m Knewstubb 19'; Con: Rokolisoa (1/1) 3'	World Rugby	Try: Wade 6' c González 11' m Con: Wade (1/2) 7'

Stade de France, Paris
Referee: Ben Breakspear (Wales/Great Britain)

27 July 2024
15:00

Ireland	17–14	United States
Try: Lennox 1' c Ward 14' m Kennedy 15' m Con: Lennox (1/1) 1'	World Rugby	Try: Cummings 7' c Baker 11' c Con: Tomasin (2/2) 8', 12'

Stade de France, Paris
Referee: Fransisco Gonzalez (Uruguay)

==== Seventh place final ====
27 July 2024
18:00

Argentina	19–0	United States
Try: Osadczuk (2) 7' c, 9' c Isgro 13' m Con: Wade (2/2) 8', 9'	World Rugby

Stade de France, Paris
Referee: Nick Hogan (New Zealand)

==== Fifth place final ====
27 July 2024
18:30

New Zealand	17–7	Ireland
Try: Leo (2) 3' m, 12' c Rush 8' m Con: Knewstubb (1/1) 12'	World Rugby	Try: Mullins 9' c Con: Roche (1/1) 9'

Stade de France, Paris
Referee: Gianluca Gnecchi (Italy)

=== Medal playoff ===
Quarter-finals
25 July – Stade de France
New Zealand	7
South Africa	14
25 July – Stade de France
Argentina	14
France	26
25 July – Stade de France
Fiji	19
Ireland	15
25 July – Stade de France
Australia	18
United States	0

Semi-finals
27 July – Stade de France
South Africa	5
France	19
27 July – Stade de France
Fiji	31
Australia	7

Gold medal match
27 July – Stade de France
France	28
Fiji	7
Bronze medal match
27 July – Stade de France
South Africa	26
Australia	19

==== Quarter-finals ====
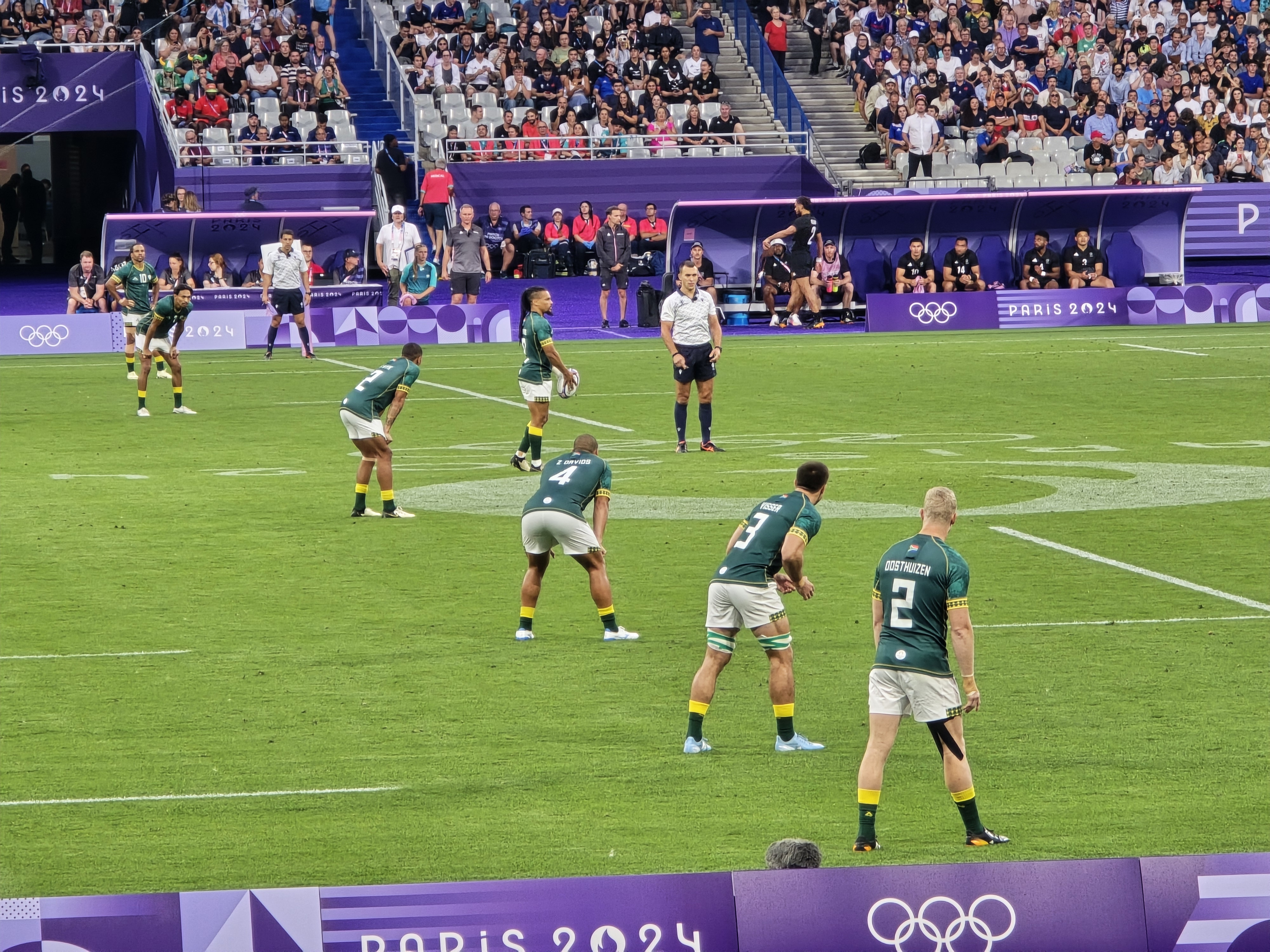
South Africa kick off against New Zealand

25 July 2024
21:00

New Zealand	7–14	South Africa
Try: Leo 10' c Con: Knewstubb (1/1) 10'	World Rugby	Try: S. Davids 3' c Leyds 7' c Con: Leyds (2/2) 4', 7'

Stade de France, Paris
Attendance: 70,000
Referee: Adam Leal (England/Great Britain)

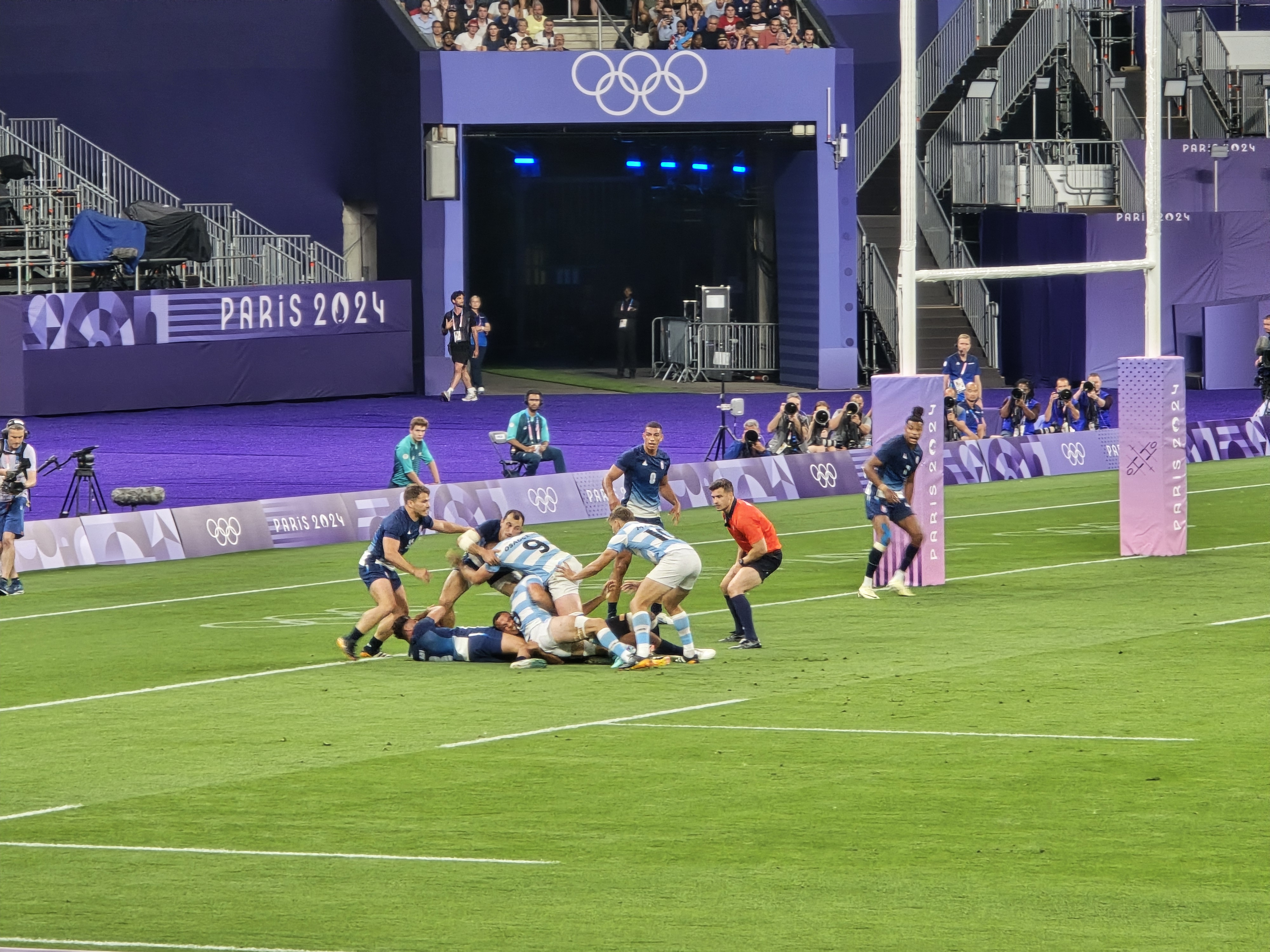
Argentina attacking the try line against France

25 July 2024
21:30

Argentina	14–26	France
Try: Isgró 9' c Moneta 12' c Con: Mare (1/1) 9'; Pellandini (1/1) 12',	World Rugby	Try: Timo 4' c Grandidier Nkanang (2) 4' c, 7' c Dupont 15' m Con: Rebbadj (3/3) 4', 6', 8'

Stade de France, Paris
Attendance: 70,000
Referee: Jordan Way (Australia)

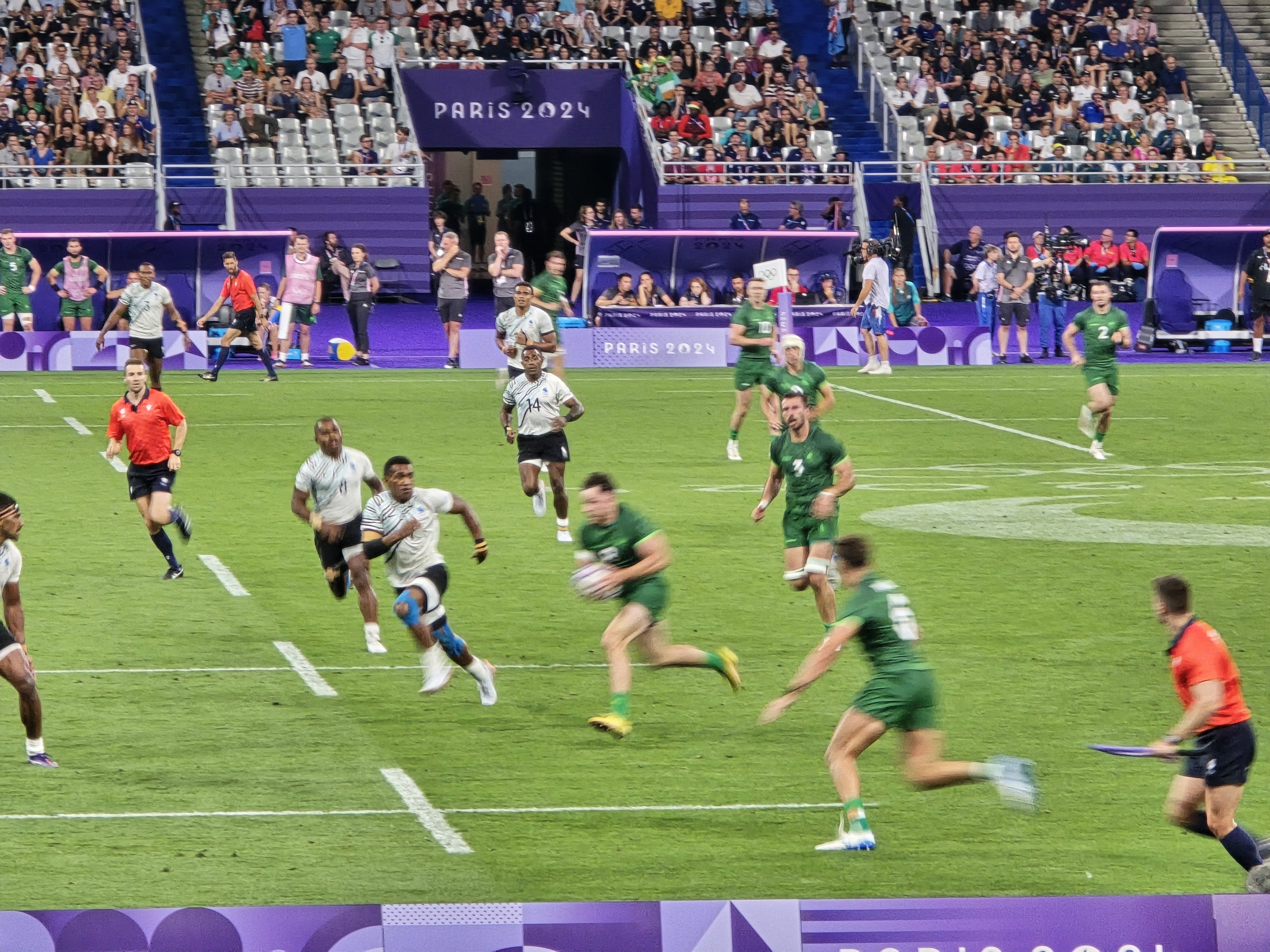
Ireland in possession against Fiji

25 July 2024
22:00

Fiji	19–15	Ireland
Try: Baleiwairiki 1' c Nasova 12' c Nacuqu 12' m Con: Teba (1/1) 2'; Tamani (1/1) 13'	World Rugby	Try: Mullins (2) 5' m, 7' m Ward 9' m

Stade de France, Paris
Attendance: 70,000
Referee: Nick Hogan (New Zealand)

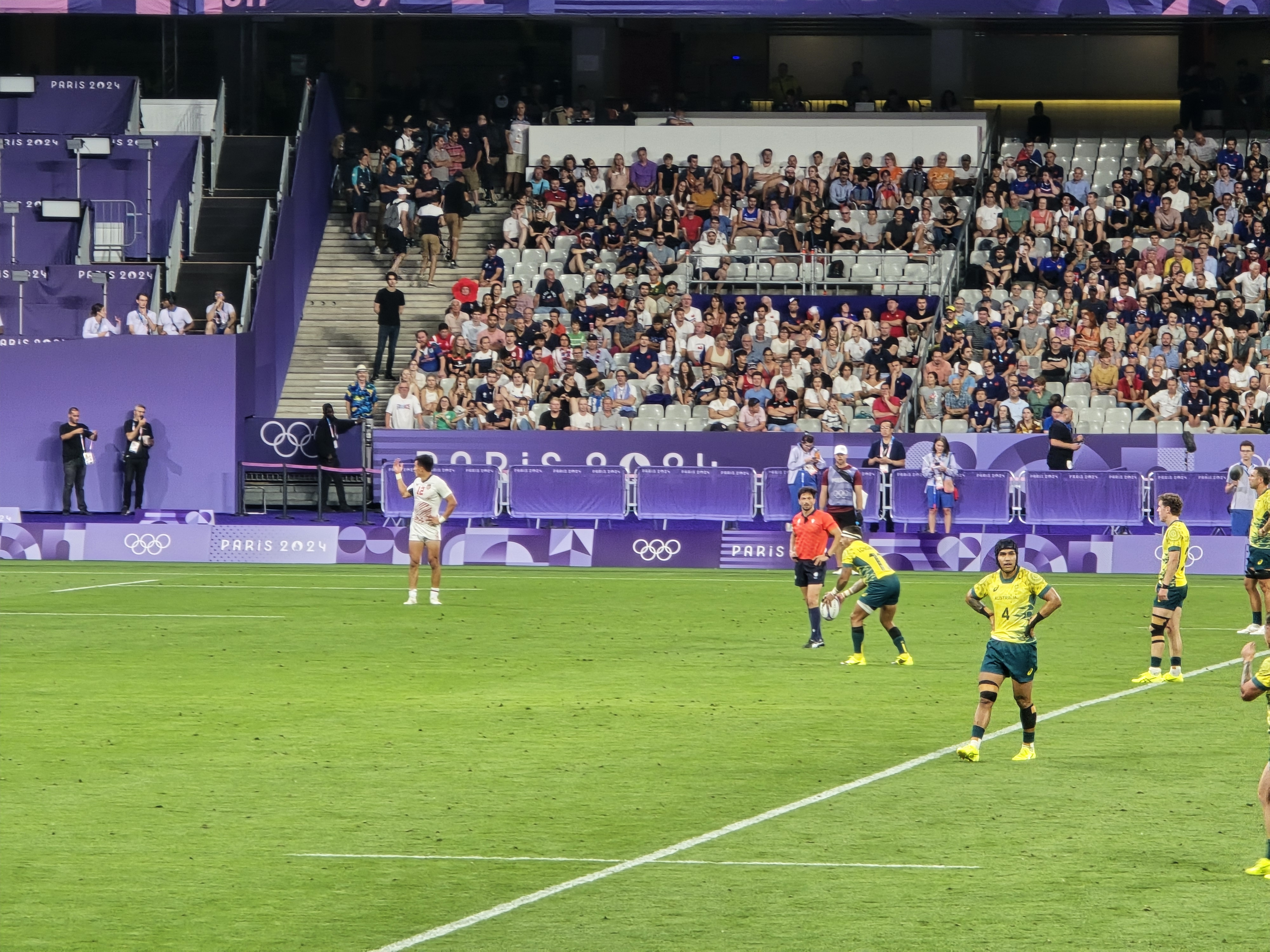
Australia take a penalty against the United States

25 July 2024
22:30

Australia	18–0	United States
Try: Turner 5' m Toole 13' m Longbottom 15' m Pen: Longbottom (1/1) 14'	World Rugby

Stade de France, Paris
Attendance: 70,000
Referee: Jérémy Rozier (France)

==== Semi-finals ====
27 July 2024
15:30

South Africa	5–19	France
Try: Leyds 10' m	World Rugby	Try: Rebbadj (2) 11' c, 14' c Sepho 15' m Con: Rebbadj (2/3) 12', 14'

Stade de France, Paris
Referee: Rueben Keane (Australia)

27 July 2024
16:00

Fiji	31–7	Australia
Try: Nasova 8' c Baleiwairiki 8' c Rasaku 11' c Ravutaumada 14' c Con: Teba (2/2) 8', 9'; Nacuqu (2/2) 15'; Pen: Veilawa (1/1) 14'	World Rugby	Try: Dowling 6' c Con: Roache (1/1) 6'

Stade de France, Paris
Referee: AJ Jacobs (South Africa)

==== Bronze medal match ====
27 July 2024
19:00

(bronze) South Africa	26–19	Australia
Try: S. Davids 6' m Z. Davids (2) 10' c, 11' c Williams 15' c Con: Leyds (2/3) 10', 11'; Soyizwapi (1/1) 15'	World Rugby	Try: Lawson 5' c Toole 12' c Paterson 14' m Con: Roache (2/3) 5', 13'

Stade de France, Paris
Referee: Jérémy Rozier (France)

==== Gold medal match ====
27 July 2024
19:45

(gold) France	28–7	Fiji (silver)
Try: Joseph 5' c Grandidier 8' c Dupont (2) 13' c, 15' c Con: Rebbadj (1/1) 6'; Riva (2/2) 8', 13'; Barraque (1/1) 15'	World Rugby	Try: Talacolo 2' c Con: Teba (1/1) 2'

Stade de France, Paris
Referee: Jordan Way (Australia)

== Final ranking ==
Rank	Team	Matches	Points	Avg points	Tries	Avg tries
1st place, gold medalist(s)	France	6	116	19.33	18	3.00
2nd place, silver medalist(s)	Fiji	6	154	25.67	23	3.83
3rd place, bronze medalist(s)	South Africa	6	104	17.33	16	2.67
4	Australia	6	108	18.00	17	2.83
5	New Zealand	6	112	18.67	18	3.00
6	Ireland	6	101	16.83	17	2.83
7	Argentina	6	118	19.67	18	3.00
8	United States	6	71	11.83	11	1.83
9	Kenya	5	48	9.60	8	1.60
10	Samoa	5	99	19.80	15	3.00
11	Uruguay	5	76	15.20	12	2.40
12	Japan	5	39	7.80	7	1.40

== Player statistics ==
Leading scorers
Rank	Player	Matches played	Points	Tries	Conversions	Penalty Goals
1	Perry Baker	6	30	6		
1	Iowane Teba	6	30	2	10/12	
3	Rayan Rebbadj	6	29	3	7/8	
3	Akuila Rokolisoa	6	29	3	7/10	
5	Tristan Leyds	6	28	2	9/12	
6	Moses Leo	6	25	5		
6	Chay Mullins	6	25	5		
6	Waisea Nacuqu	6	25	3	5/6	
6	Joji Nasova	6	25	5	0/1	
6	Matías Osadczuk	6	25	5		
6	Dietrich Roache	6	25	1	10/15	
12	Joaquín Pellandini	6	21	1	8/10	
12	Paul Scanlan	5	21	3	3/4	
14	Selvyn Davids	6	20	4	0/1	
14	Antoine Dupont	6	20	4		
14	Juan Gonzalez	5	20	4		
14	Aaron Grandidier Nkanang	5	20	4		
14	Ngarohi McGarvey-Black	3	20	4		
14	Kaminieli Rasaku	6	20	4		
14	Zac Ward	6	20	4		
21	Neueli Leitufia	5	18	2	4/5	
22	Vaa Apelu Maliko	5	17	3	1/1	
23	Baltazar Amaya	5	15	3		
23	Iosefo Baleiwairiki	6	15	3		
23	Zain Davids	6	15	3		
23	Henry Hutchison	6	15	3		
23	Terry Kennedy	6	15	3		
23	Nathan Lawson	6	15	3		
23	John Okeyo	5	15	3		
23	Motu Opetai	5	15	3		
23	Corey Toole	5	15	3		
23	Shotaro Tsuoka	5	15	3		
33	Stephen Tomasin	6	14		7/8	
34	Andrew Knewstubb	6	13	1	4/7	
34	Hugo Lennox	6	13	1	4/6	
34	Antony Mboya	5	13	1	4/7	
34	Juan Manuel Tafernaberry	3	13	1	4/5	
38	Agustin Fraga	4	12	2	1/1	
39	Tom Maiava	4	11	1	3/3	
39	Tobias Wade	6	11	1	3/5	
41	Bautista Basso	3	10	2		
41	Leroy Carter	6	10	2		
41	Jordan Conroy	2	10	2		
41	Ben Dowling	6	10	2		
41	Fehi Fineanganofo	6	10	2		
41	Luciano Gonzalez	6	10	2		
41	Rodrigo Isgro	3	10	2		
41	Jefferson-Lee Joseph	6	10	2		
41	Lucas Lacamp	6	10	2		
41	Marcos Moneta	6	10	2		
41	Ryan Oosthuizen	6	10	2		
41	Selestino Ravutaumada	6	10	2		
41	Jordan Sepho	6	10	2		
41	Andy Timo	6	10	2		
41	James Turner	6	10	2		
41	Shilton van Wyk	6	10	2		
57	Terio Tamani Veilawa	6	9		3/4	1/1
58	Jean-Pascal Barraque	5	8		4/7	
58	Guillermo Lijtenstein	5	8		4/6	
58	Maurice Longbottom	5	8	1	0/1	1/1
58	Mark Roche	6	8		4/11	
62	Faafoi Falaniko	5	7	1	1/2	
63	Samuel Asati	5	5	1		
63	Orrin Bizer	6	5	1		
63	Niall Comerford	6	5	1		
63	Aaron Cummings	6	5	1		
63	Tomas Elizalde	4	5	1		
63	Ignacio Facciolo	5	5	1		
63	Matteo Graziano	5	5	1		
63	Kippei Ishida	5	5	1		
63	Taiga Ishida	5	5	1		
63	Josaia Raisuqe	5	5	1		
63	Lalomilo Lalomilo	5	5	1		
63	Ponepati Loganimasi	3	5	1		
63	Nick Malouf	6	5	1		
63	Harry McNulty	6	5	1		
63	Yoshihiro Noguchi	5	5	1	0/3	
63	Chrisant Ojwang	5	5	1		
63	Patrick Odongo Okong'o	5	5	1		
63	Steve Onosai	5	5	1		
63	Henry Paterson	5	5	1		
63	Brady Rush	6	5	1		
63	German Schulz	3	5	1		
63	Rosko Specman	5	5	1		
63	Joseva Talacolo	6	5	1		
63	Marcus Tupuola	5	5	1		
63	Jerry Tuwai	6	5	1		
63	Kazuma Ueda	5	5	1		
63	Mateo Vinals	5	5	1		
63	Impi Visser	6	5	1		
63	Kevin Wekesa	5	5	1		
63	Shaun Williams	5	5	1		
63	Antoine Zeghdar	6	5	1		
94	Ronald Brown	4	4		2/2	
94	Santiago Mare	5	4		2/2	
94	Paulin Riva	6	4		2/2	
94	Kippei Taninaka	5	4		2/4	
98	Madison Hughes	6	2		1/3	
98	Siviwe Soyizwapi	5	2		1/1	
