= Sports in Odisha =

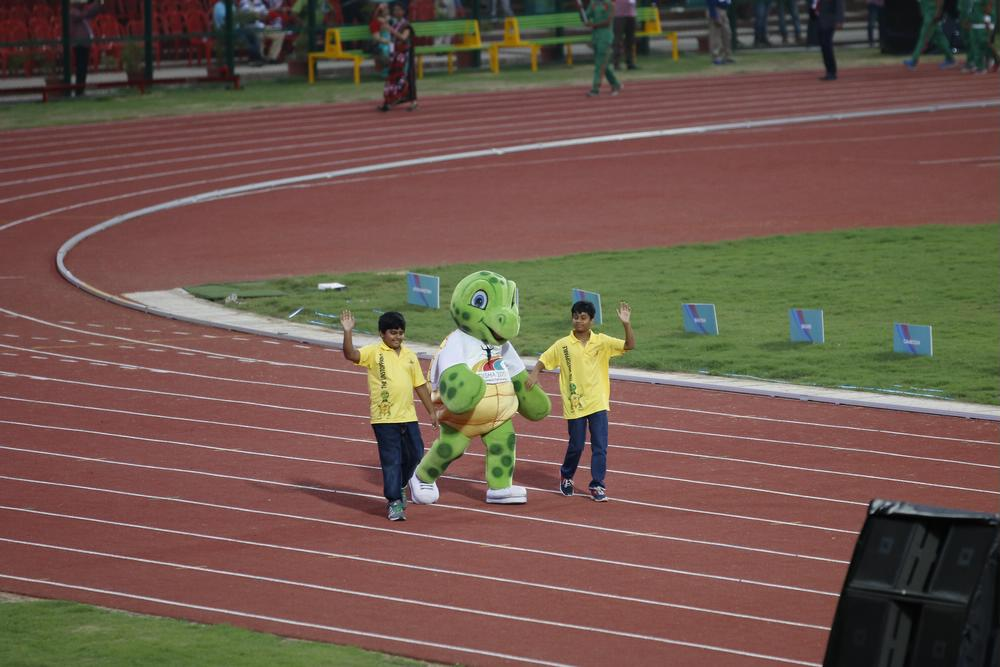
Olly: Mascot for Sporting Events in Odisha

Sports is an important part of the culture of Odisha and plays a key role in development of the state. Field hockey, athletics, association football, cricket, weightlifting, rugby union and rugby sevens are among the most popular sports in the Indian state of Odisha. Odisha is also referred to as the Sports Capital of India, due to the extensive development of a robust sports ecosystem, infrastructure and hosting of major domestic and international sporting events. The Kalinga Stadium in Bhubaneswar and the Barabati Stadium in Cuttack are among the major stadiums in the state.

== Field hockey ==
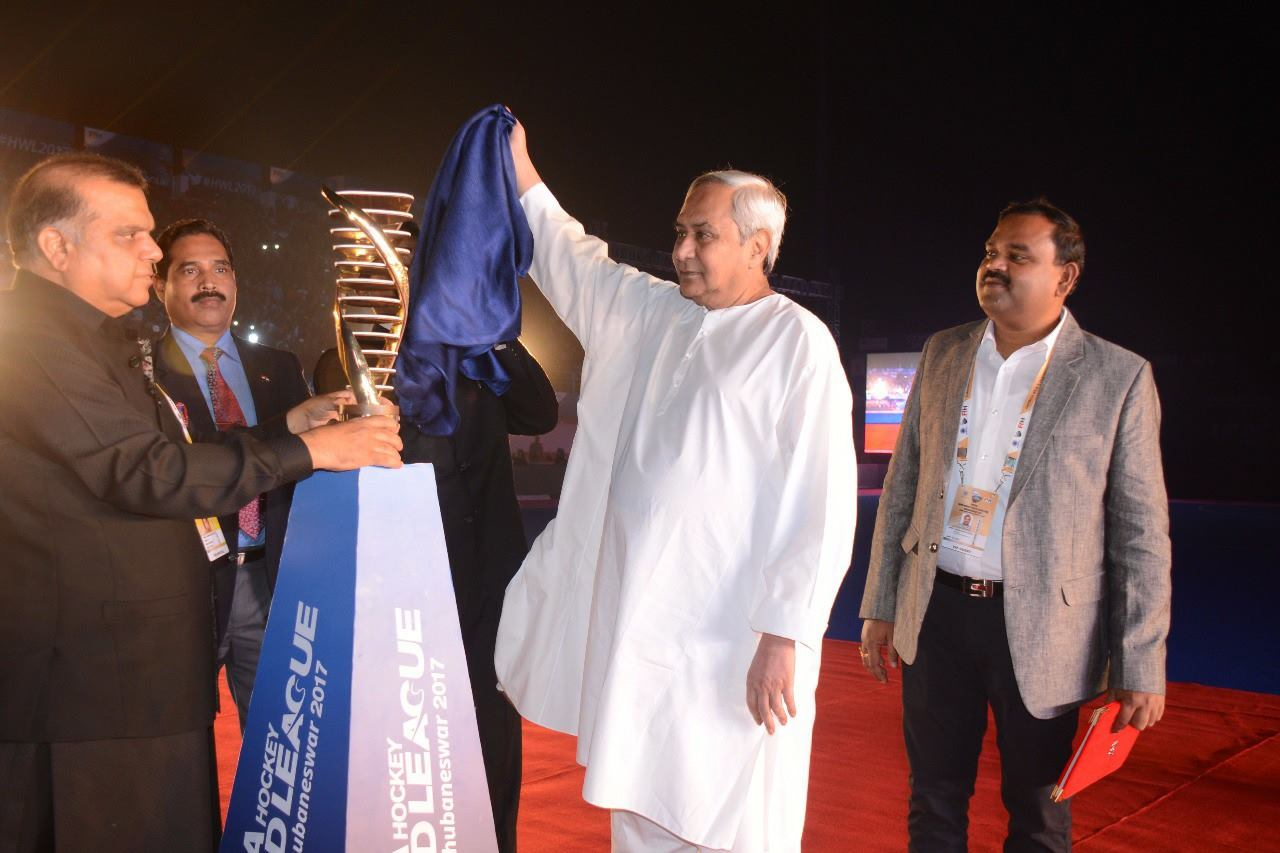
Odisha's Chief Minister Naveen Patnaik Unveiling the Trophy of the 2016–17 Men's FIH Hockey World League Final

Field hockey is the most popular sport in the state. In a first-of-its-kind association, the Government of Odisha, has become the first state government in India to sponsor a national team. In early 2018, the government launched its sporting logo, signing a five-year sponsorship agreement with Hockey India, replacing the former sponsors. Odisha field hockey team has been providing India, with some extremely talented players, who eventually are called up for the national teams, i.e. India men's national field hockey team and India women's national field hockey team.

The 35th edition of the Hockey Champions Trophy i.e. 2014 Men's Hockey Champions Trophy was held between 6–14 December 2014 in Bhubaneswar, India.

The 3rd and the last edition of the FIH Hockey World League, i.e. the qualification stage for the 2018 Men's Hockey World Cup, was held in Kalinga Stadium in Bhubaneswar, Odisha

The 14th edition of the Hockey World Cup i.e. 2018 Men's Hockey World Cup, was held from 28 November to 16 December 2018, at the Kalinga Stadium in Bhubaneswar, Odisha. Belgium turned out to be the champions after defeating Netherlands in the Final on 16 December 2018.

In 2019, the Government of Odisha, Tata Steel & Tata Trusts (Hockey Ace foundation) joined hands to launch Odisha Naval Tata Hockey High Performance Centre to train and prepare the next generation of hockey talent in the state.

=== Internationals ===
Not an exhaustive list.
Represented in major global and continental competitions.

Men

- Dilip Tirkey
- Lazarus Barla
- Ignace Tirkey
- William Xalco
- Prabodh Tirkey
- Sunil Ekka
- Roshan Minz
- Bikash Toppo
- Samir Baxla
- Belsajar Horo
- Innocent Kullu
- Manjit Kullu
- Birendra Lakra
- Amit Rohidas
- Sushant Tirkey

- Dipsan Tirkey
- Nilam Sanjeep Xess
- Shilanand Lakra
- Ashis Kumar Topno
- Abhisek Lakra
- Amandeep Lakra
- Rosan Kujur

Women

- Gloria Dung Dung
- Jyoti Sunita Kullu
- Mukta Xalxo
- Paulina Surin
- Agnecia Lugun
- Annarita Kerketta
- Subhadra Pradhan
- Binita Toppo
- Sarita Lakra
- Anjana Barla
- Nilima Kujur
- Binita Xess
- Mukta Prava Barla
- Poonam Toppo
- Roselin Dung Dung

- Sulochana Kishan
- Deep Grace Ekka
- Anupa Barla
- Sunita Lakra
- Namita Toppo
- Lilima Minz
- Rashmita Minz
- Punam Barla
- Mariana Kujur
- Jyoti Chhatri
- Sunelita Toppo

== Athletics ==
Sport of athletics is another major sport in the state. Odisha has been producing some of the India's finest athletes who dominate in national and international sporting events. The 22nd edition of the Asian Athletics Championships i.e. 2017 Asian Athletics Championships, was held from 6 to 9 July 2017 at the Kalinga Stadium in Bhubaneswar, Odisha, India. Around 560 athletes from 41 countries attended the international event.

== Football ==
Association football is also an uprising, popular sport in Odisha. Football Association of Odisha (FAO) is the administrating governing body for football in Odisha. In women's football particularly, the Odisha women's football team has dominated at national levels. They have a team Odisha FC that plays and compete with others in ISL. Odisha FC also has a women's team that plays in the Indian Women's League. A club called Sports Odisha also participates in this league, as well as the Indian men's fourth division of football, I-League 3. A club known as Samaleswari SC also used to play in the I-League Second Division, which was then the second tier in Indian Football.

=== Internationals ===
Men

- A. M. Bachan (1951)
- Golak Samal (1955)
- Deba Singh (1967–1968)
- R. P. Singh (2000–2002)

Women

- Sradhanjali Samantaray (1997–2007)
- Ranjita Mohanty (1999–2007)
- Pinky Bompal Magar (2005–2013)
- Gitanjali Khuntia (2007)
- Sasmita Mallik (2007–2017)
- Prasanti Pradhan (2007)
- Alochana Senapati (2007–2012)
- Gayatri Mallick (2010)
- Supriya Routray (2010–2016)
- Sita Sharma (2010–2012)
- Suprava Samal (2010–2014)

- Rashmita Patra (2011)
- Lochana Munda (2011–2017)
- Swarnamayee Samal (2011)
- Bijayalaxmi Sahoo (2011)
- Tikina Samal (2013–2014)
- Manisa Panna (2015–)
- Pyari Xaxa (2015–)
- Jabamani Tudu (2016–)
- Juli Kishan (2022–)
- Manisha Naik (2025–)
- Jasoda Munda (2026–)

== Cricket ==
Cricket is a popular sport in Odisha and is immensely popular among the masses of the state. It houses the Barabati Stadium at Cuttack which the home ground of the state cricket teams. The Odisha Cricket Association (OCA) is the administrating governing body for cricket in Odisha. In domestic cricket, the Odisha cricket team and Odisha women's cricket team competes at national levels.

=== Internationals ===
Men

- Debashish Mohanty (1997–2001)
- Sanjay Raul (1998)
- Shiv Sunder Das (2000–2002)
- Pragyan Ojha (2008–2013)
- Anshuman Rath (2014–, Hong Kong international)

Women

- Madhuri Mehta (2012–2014)
- Rasanara Parwin (2012–2013)
- Swagatika Rath (2013)
- Sukanya Parida (2016)

== Weightlifting ==
Weightlifting is a popular sport in Odisha and is immensely popular in the Ganjam district, especially in the city of Brahmapur. The Odisha Weightlifting Association (OWA) is the administrating governing body for weightlifting in Odisha.

== Volleyball ==
Volleyball is a popular sport in Odisha and is popular in the coastal districts. The Odisha Volleyball Association (OVA) is the administrating governing body for volleyball in Odisha.

=== Internationals ===
Men

- Lotak Bindu Dash (1990)
- Mohammed Masiuz Zama (1990–1992)
- Rahul Barik (2023)

Women

- Jhililata Sena (2005–2009)

== Rugby ==
Rugby is popular both in men and women categories in Odisha. The Odisha Rugby Football Association is the state's administrating body for rugby football in Odisha. The Odisha women's rugby union team and Odisha women's rugby sevens team have been dominating since the past decade having won nearly all competitions at national levels. On the other hand, Odisha rugby union team and Odisha rugby sevens team have also made odisha proud with their performance at national levels. Both men and women of Odisha have provided India some of its best players. Odisha will be hosting the Asia Rugby Women's Championship from 26 to 28 October 2018.

== High Performance Centres ==
The Government of Odisha, in collaboration with various entities, have launched a few High Performance Centres at Kalinga Stadium in order to provide high-class training, facilities and infrastructure to the young sportsmen of Odisha. The list of HPCs is as follows:

- Abhinav Bindra Targeting Performance (ABTP)
- Dalmia Bharat Gopichand Badminton Academy
- JSW Swimming HPC
- Khelo India State Centre of Excellence (KISCE) for Athletics, Hockey, and Weightlifting
- KJS Ahluwalia and Tenvic Sports HPC for Weightlifting
- Odisha Naval Tata Hockey High Performance Centre (ONTHHPC)
- Odisha Aditya Birla and Gagan Narang Shooting HPC
- Reliance Foundation Odisha Athletics HPC
- SAI Regional Badminton Academy
- AIFF High Performance Centre

== Events ==
Odisha have been hosting various sporting events in the recent years.

=== Athletics ===
Event	Year	Organiser
Asian Athletics Championships	2017	Athletics Federation of India

=== Badminton ===
Event	Year	Organiser
BWF World Tour	2022	Badminton Association of India

=== Football ===
Event	Year	Organiser	Dates
Women's Gold Cup	2019	All India Football Federation; Football Association of Odisha	9–15 February 2019
FIFA U-17 Women's World Cup	2022	All India Football Federation; Football Association of Odisha	11–30 October 2022

=== Hockey ===
Event	Year	Organiser
Men's FIH Hockey Junior World Cup	2021	Hockey India
Hockey World Cup	2018	Hockey India
FIH Hockey World League	2017	Hockey India
Hockey Champions Trophy	2014	Hockey India

=== Rugby ===
Event	Year	Organiser	Dates
Asia Rugby U18 Girls Rugby Sevens Championship	2018	Rugby India; Odisha Rugby Football Association	26–28 October 2018

=== Table Tennis ===
Event	Year	Organiser	Dates
Commonwealth Table Tennis Championships	2019	Odisha State Table Tennis Association	17–22 July 2019

=== Tennis ===
Event	Year	Organiser	Dates
India F1 Futures	26 February 2018 – 4 March 2018	Odisha Tennis Association	

== Leagues ==
=== State ===
Sport	League	Organiser
Cricket	Odisha Premier League	Odisha Cricket Association
Football	FAO League	Football Association of Odisha
Football	FAO Super Cup	Football Association of Odisha
Football	Odisha Women's League	Football Association of Odisha
Tennis	Odisha Tennis Premier League	Odisha Tennis Association

=== National ===
==== National Leagues Hosted by Odisha ====
===== Football =====
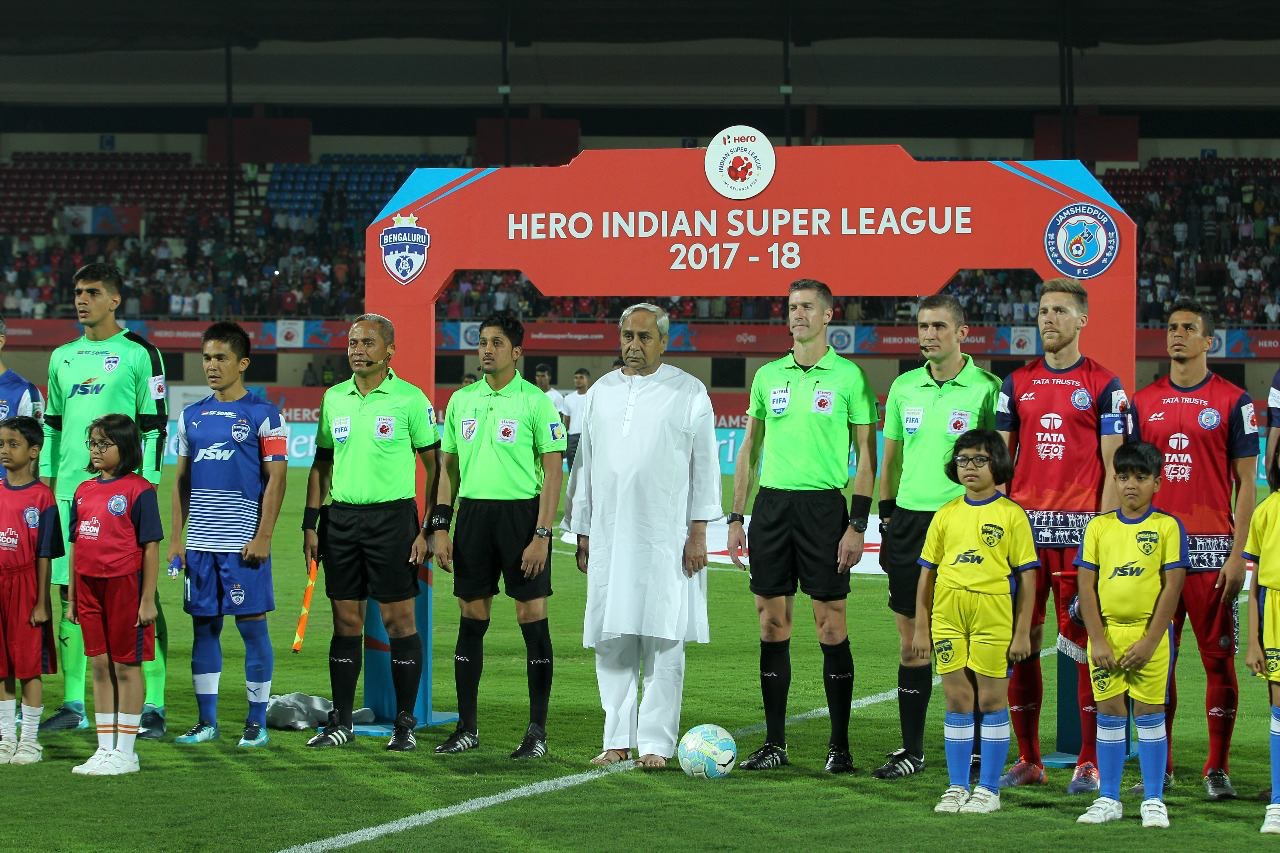
Indian Super League Match: Jamshedpur FC vc Bengaluru FC at Kalinga Stadium

Event	Year
I-League	2018-19
Indian Super League	2017–18
Indian Super Cup	2019; 2018

===== Hockey =====
Event	Year	Organiser
Hockey India League	2014; 2015; 2016; 2017	Hockey India
