= Odisha rugby union team =

Odisha
- Union: Odisha Rugby Football Association
- Ground: Kalinga Stadium (Capacity: 15,000)
- Coach: Manas Kumar Jena
- Captain: Bikrant Kumar Routa
Team kit

The Odisha men's rugby union team represents Odisha in rugby union. The Odisha Rugby Football Association (ORFA), in association with India Rugby Football Union is the governing body for Odisha Men's Rugby Union Team. Odisha is currently one of the best rugby football teams in India.

== Stadium ==
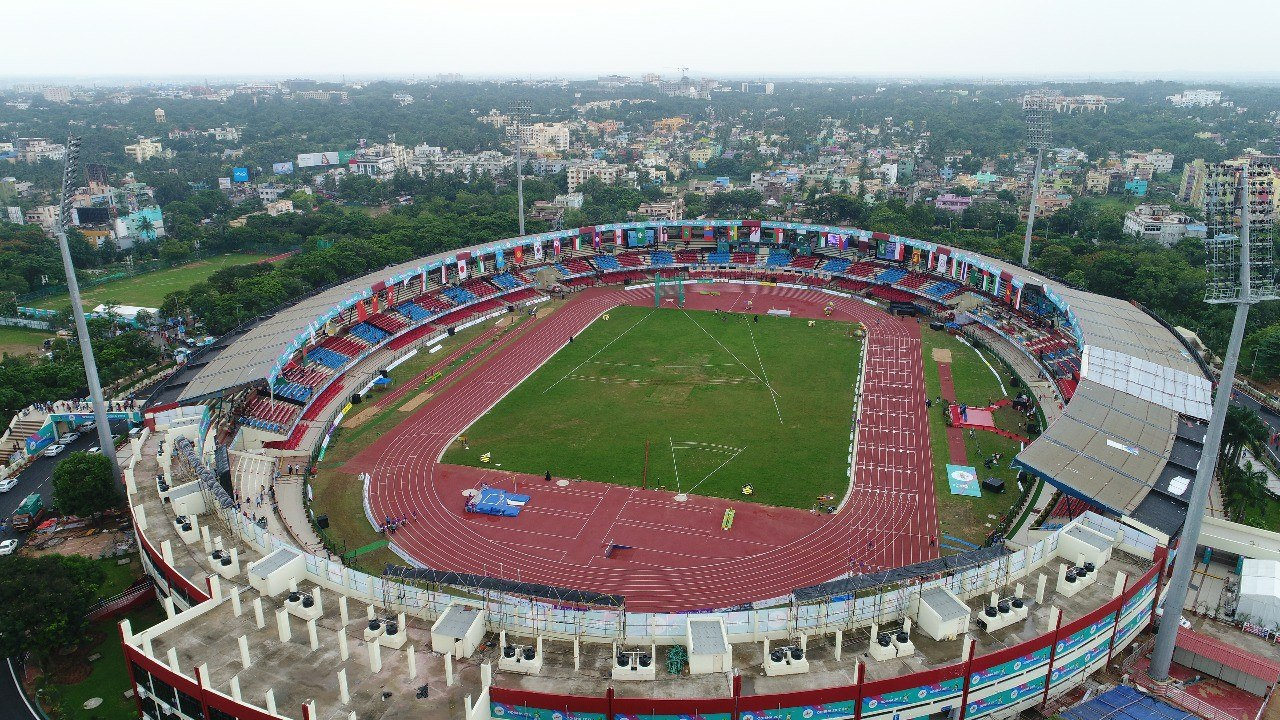
Kalinga Stadium

The Odisha Rugby Football Association (ORFA) has various bases across the state of Odisha; two of the main bases are Kalinga Stadium and KIIT Stadium in Bhubaneswar.

== Kit ==
Odisha men's team have worn dark blue, red and black for all of their Rugby Union games. At present, the shirt body is dark blue, the sleeves are red and the socks and shorts are both black.

== Squad ==
Odisha's 26 Member Squad for 2016 All India & South Asia Rugby Tournament

- Manash Kumar Jena (Coach)
- Bikrant Kumar Routa (Captain)
- Subhra Narayan Mohanty(Ground incharge/Team manneger)
- Shanawaz Ahmed
- Sambit Pradhan
- Diptiranjan Khuntia
- Ratnakar Hembram
- Narayan Sahu
- Sachin Kalah
- Dibya Ranjan Dalai
- Aditya Digal
- Sushil Hembram
- Akshay Kumar Mahanta
- Bibhuti Bhusan Sethy
- Santosh Sethy
- Gyanaranjan Prusti
- Sananda Sagar Pradhan
- Sridhar Mahalik
- Balaram Jena
- Prasanna Kumar Nayak
- Jitendra kumar Pradhan
- Sheikh Gufran
- Balaram Sahu
- Sushanta Behera
- Priya Ranjan Rout
- Kiran Kumar Jena

== Administration ==
The following is the current organisational structure of Odisha Rugby Football Association (ORFA):

| Position | Name |
|---|---|
| President | (India) Priyadarshi Mishra |
| Head coach | (India) Manas Kumar Jena |
| Assistant Coach | (India) Dhiren Kumar Rout |
| Secretary | (India) Upendra Kumar Mohanty |
| Development Officer | (India) Manas Kumar Jena |

== Honours ==
- Senior National Men's Rugby 7s Championships

(bronze) Third (2): 2013, 2021

- Callaghan Cup - National Division 2 Men's Rugby XVs

(gold) Winners (1): 2014 (KISS)
(bronze) Third (1): 2014 (Bhubaneswar)

- Junior National U20 Boys 7s Championships

(bronze) Third (1): 2014 (KISS)

- Junior National U20 Boys XVs Championships

(gold) Winners (1): 2014 (KISS)

- SGFI School National U19 Boys Rugby 7s

(gold) Winners (1): 2015-16

- SGFI School National U17 Boys Rugby 7s

(silver) Runners-up (1): 2015
