= Odisha women's rugby union team =

Odisha
- Union: Odisha Rugby Football Association
- Ground: Kalinga Stadium (Capacity: 15,000)
- Coach: Manas Kumar Jena
- Captain: Bhagyalaxmi Barik
Team kit

The Odisha women's rugby union team represents Odisha in rugby union. The Odisha Rugby Football Association (ORFA), in association with India Rugby Football Union is the governing body for Odisha Women's Rugby Union Team. Odisha's women's team is among all-time best in India as it have nearly won every competition they have played.

== Stadium ==
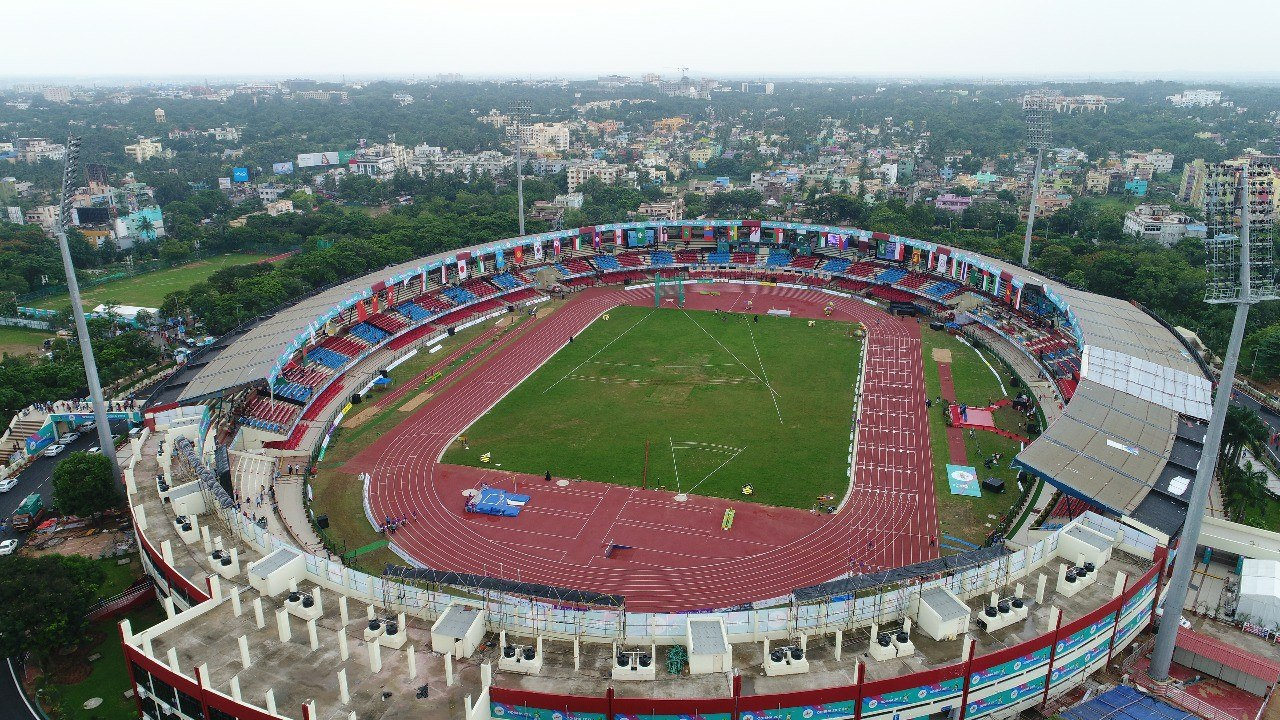
Kalinga Stadium

The Odisha Rugby Football Association (ORFA) has various bases across the state of Odisha; two of the main are Kalinga Stadium and KIIT Stadium in Bhubaneswar.

== Kit ==
Odisha women's team have worn yellow and black for all of their Rugby Union games. The shirt's body is of yellow color, the sleeves are white and the socks and shorts are both black.

== Squad ==
2016 All India Women's 15s Rugby Tournament

- Bhagyalaxmi Barik (Captain)
- Hupi Majhi
- Rajani Sabar
- Manjulata Pradhan
- Sanjukta Munda
- Meerarani Henbram
- Saraswati Hansdha
- Basanti Pangi
- Chandamuni Tudu
- Laxmipriya Sahu
- Jyosthna Rani Nayak
- Poonam Singh
- Kabita Kasturi Padhiari
- Puja Senapati
- Saraswati Hembram
- Sasmita Maharana
- Subha Laxmi Barik
- Puspalata Pradhan
- S. Yalna Priyadarshini
- Subhapriya Barik
- Lipika Biswal
- Prangya
- Ayushi Das

== Administration ==
The following is the current organisational structure of Odisha Rugby Football Association (ORFA):

Position	Name
President	(India) Priyadarshi Mishra
Head coach	(India) Manas Kumar Jena
Assistant coach	(India) Dhiren Kumar Rout
Secretary	(India) Upendra Kumar Mohanty
Development officer	(India) Manas Kumar Jena

== Honours ==
- Senior National Women's Rugby 7s Championships

(gold) Winners (2): 2013 (KISS), 2015, 2021
(silver) Runners-up (1): 2014 (KISS)

- All India & South Asia Rugby Tournament

(gold) Winners (2): 2016, 2018
(silver) Runners-up (1): 2017

- National Games of India

(gold) Winners (1): 2015

- Junior National U18 Girls Rugby 7s Championships

(gold) Winners (1): 2014 (KISS)

- SGFI School National U19 Girls Rugby 7s

(gold) Winners (1): 2015-16
(silver) Runners-up (1): 2014-15

- SGFI School National U17 Girls Rugby 7s

(gold) Winners (1): 2015
