= Odisha rugby sevens team =

Odisha
- Union: Odisha Rugby Football Association
- Ground: Kalinga Stadium (Capacity: 15,000)
- Coach: Manas Kumar Jena
- Captain: Bikrant Kumar Raut
Team kit

The Odisha Men's Rugby Sevens Team represents Odisha in rugby sevens. The Odisha Rugby Football Association (ORFA), in association with India Rugby Football Union is the governing body for Odisha Men's Rugby Union Team. Odisha is currently one of the best rugby football teams in India.

== Stadium ==
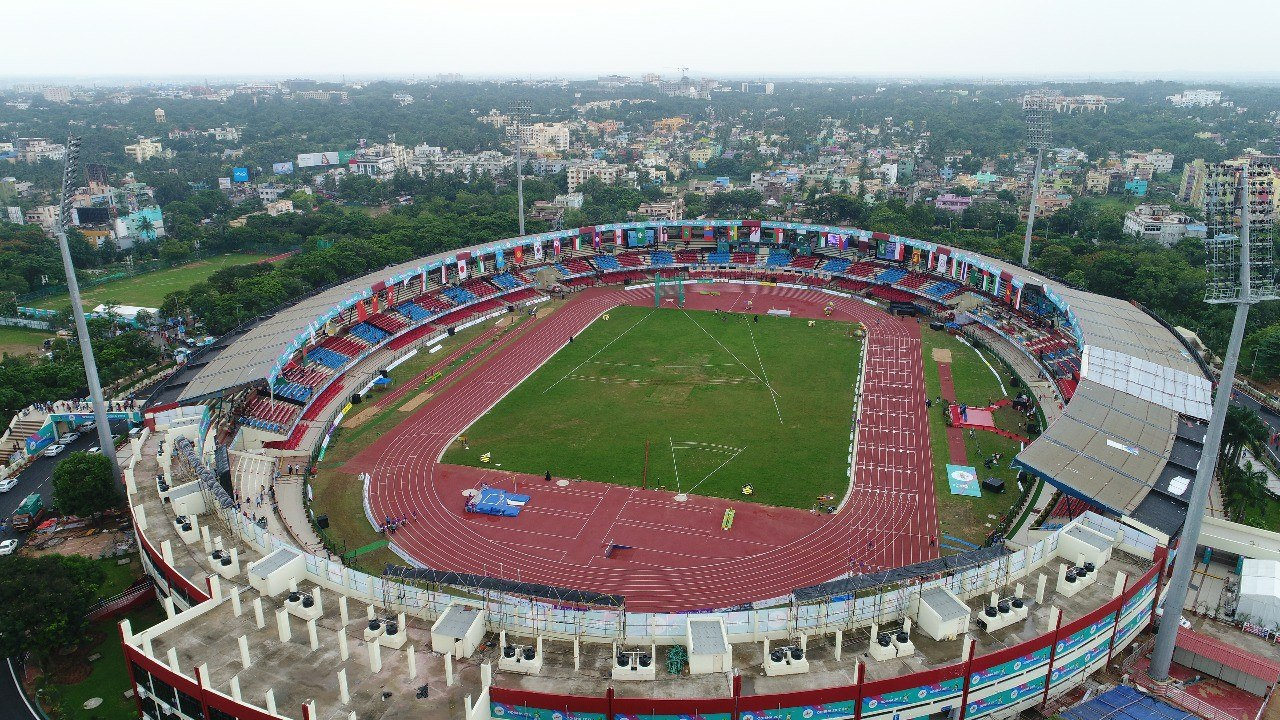
Kalinga Stadium

The Odisha Rugby Football Association (ORFA) has various bases across the state of Odisha; two of the main bases are Kalinga Stadium and KIIT Stadium in Bhubaneswar.

== Kit ==
Odisha men's team have worn dark blue, red and black for all of their Rugby Union games. At present, the shirt body is dark blue, the sleeves are red and the socks and shorts are both black.

== Squad ==
Odisha's 12 Member Squad for 2018 Senior National Rugby Sevens Championship

- Bikranta Kumar Raut (Captain)
- Suguda Majhi
- Rajkishore Murmu
- Alekha Murmu
- Bikash Chandra Murmu
- Muna Murmu
- Niranjan Biswal
- Sasanka Sekhar Tripathy
- Budhadeb Pradhan
- Lokanath Majhi
- Ratnakar Hemram
- Bibhuti Bhusan Sethi

== Administration ==
The following is the current organisational structure of Odisha Rugby Football Association (ORFA):

Position	Name
President	(India) Priyadarshi Mishra
Head coach	(India) Manas Kumar Jena
Assistant Coach	(India) Dhiren Kumar Rout
Secretary	(India) Upendra Kumar Mohanty
Development Officer	(India) Manas Kumar Jena
