= Odisha women's rugby sevens team =

Odisha
- Union: Odisha Rugby Football Association
- Ground: Kalinga Stadium (Capacity: 15,000)
- Coach: Manas Kumar Jena
- Captain: Hupi Majhi
Team kit

The Odisha Women's Rugby Sevens Team represents Odisha in rugby sevens. The Odisha Rugby Football Association (ORFA), in association with India Rugby Football Union is the governing body for Odisha Women's Rugby Sevens Team. Odisha women's rugby sevens team is currently the best rugby football team in India as they have as they have won the last five national championships.

== Stadium ==
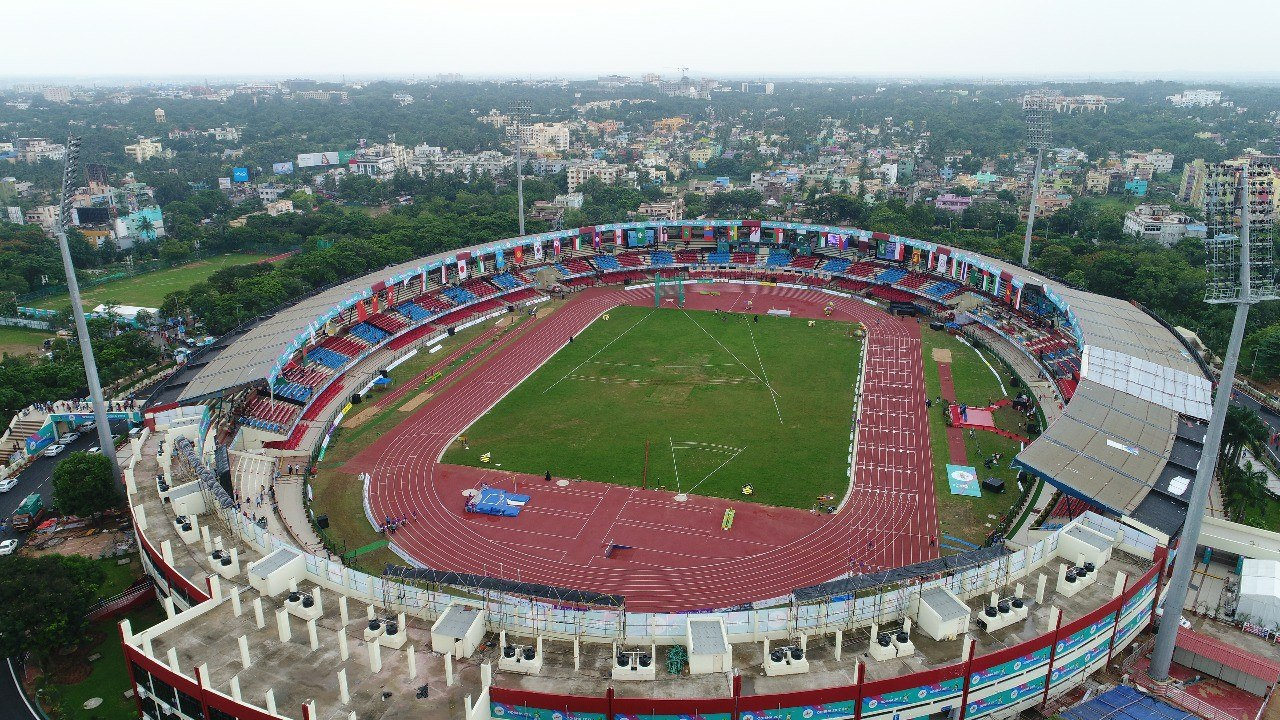
Kalinga Stadium

The Odisha Rugby Football Association (ORFA) has various bases across the state of Odisha; two of the main bases are Kalinga Stadium and KIIT Stadium in Bhubaneswar.

== Kit ==
Odisha women's team have worn yellow and black for all of their Rugby Sevens games at national level. At present, the shirt's body is of yellow color, the sleeves are white and the socks and shorts are both black.

== Squad ==
Odisha's 12 Member Squad for the 2018 Senior National Rugby Sevens Championship

- Laxmipriya Sahu
- Meerarani Hembram
- Hupi Majhi (Captain)
- Jemamani Naik
- Manjulata Pradhan
- Saraswati Hansdah
- Parbati Kisku
- Rajani Sabar
- Poonam Singh
- Sumitra Nayak
- Bhagyalaxmi Barik
- Lija Sardar

== Administration ==
The following is the current organisational structure of Odisha Rugby Football Association (ORFA):

Position	Name
President	(India) Priyadarshi Mishra
Head coach	(India) Manas Kumar Jena
Assistant Coach	(India) Dhiren Kumar Rout
Secretary	(India) Upendra Kumar Mohanty
Development Officer	(India) Manas Kumar Jena

== Honours ==
- Senior National Rugby Sevens Championship

Winners (5): 2014, 2015, 2016, 2017, 2018 Runners-Up (1): 2019
