= Rugby union in India =

Sport in India

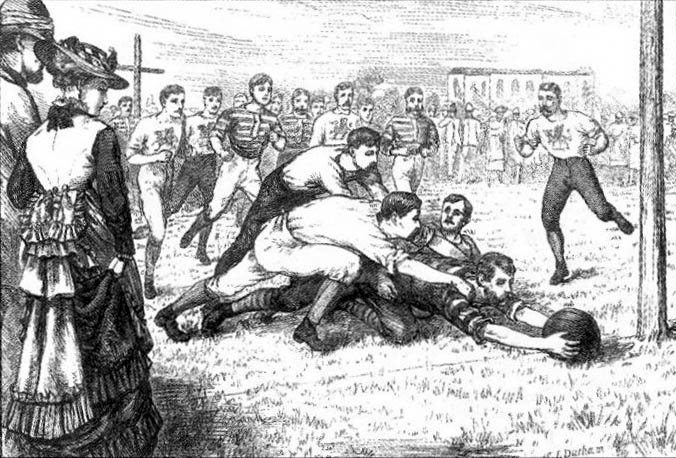
- Country: India
- Governing body: Rugby India
- National teams: India national rugby union team; India women's national rugby union team

Club competitions
- All India & South Asia Rugby Tournament; Rugby Premier League (2025–present)

Rugby union in India is a fast-growing sport. As of October 2024, India was ranked 89th in the World Rugby Rankings. As of 2016, India had 57,000 registered players, up from 24,010 in 2012, 7,160 of whom were female. The governing body is Rugby India.

== History ==
=== Pre-history ===
India, like many other countries, had a few forms of folk football. Most of these have died out, but a Manipuri game, yubi lakpi is still played in the East of India. Emma Levine, an English writer on little-known Asian sports, speculates:

"Perhaps this was the root of modern rugby? Most Manipuris are quite adamant that the modern world 'stole' the idea from them and made it into rugby... this game, which has been around for centuries, is so similar to rugby, which evolved a great deal later, that it must be more than a coincidence."

However, traditional football games can be found in many parts of the world, e.g. marn grook in Australia, cuju in China and calcio Fiorentino in Italy and Levine provides no documentary or material evidence of its antiquity.

=== British India ===
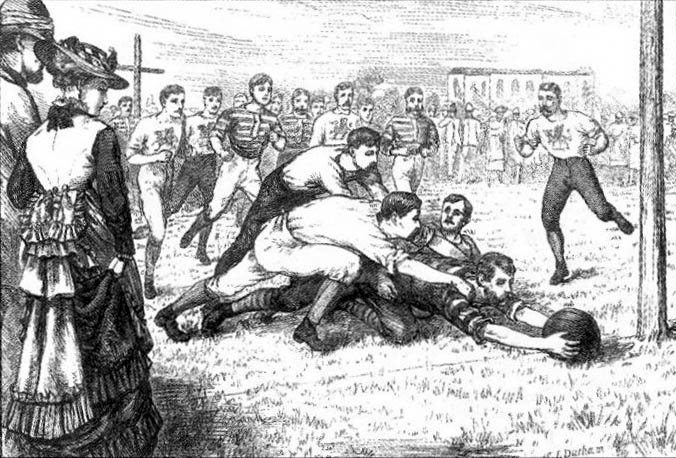
An 1875 painting of rugby being played by Europeans in Calcutta (today Kolkata). Western sports were first adopted in India during British rule.

Like other sports founded in England and brought to India during the British Rule such as cricket, rugby union has a long history in India. The earliest trace of Rugby Football in India dates back to a scratch match or two played in Calcutta and Madras during the visit of H.M.S. Galatea in 1871. The teak goal posts used on the occasion of the Calcutta Match were afterward used by the C.F.C. up to at least 1886.

The first recorded match was played on Christmas Day 1872, at CFC in Calcutta, it was played between England and a combined team of Scotland, Ireland and Wales. The game caught on and had to be repeated within the week.

The game was now established. In January 1873, officers were appointed and the Club Rolls gave a total of 137 members. The Club colours were chosen as red and white, broad stripes.

From then on, rugby in India, lingered on at a very low key. Part of the reason for this was that the British preferred to play apart from their colonial subjects, leading to a low take up by the local population. Another reason was the climate, which meant that games would frequently have to be played in the evenings or early morning, which meant that it was not too popular with the colonists themselves.

=== 20th and 21st Centuries ===
At its lowest ebb, in the 1980s, the Indian RFU was being run out of the Irish Consulate at the Royal Bombay Yacht Club's chambers. However, a fairly successful campaign in the 1990s put the game back on its feet.

Indian delegates were amongst those who went to the centenary congress of the International Rugby Football Board in 1986.

=== Calcutta Cup ===
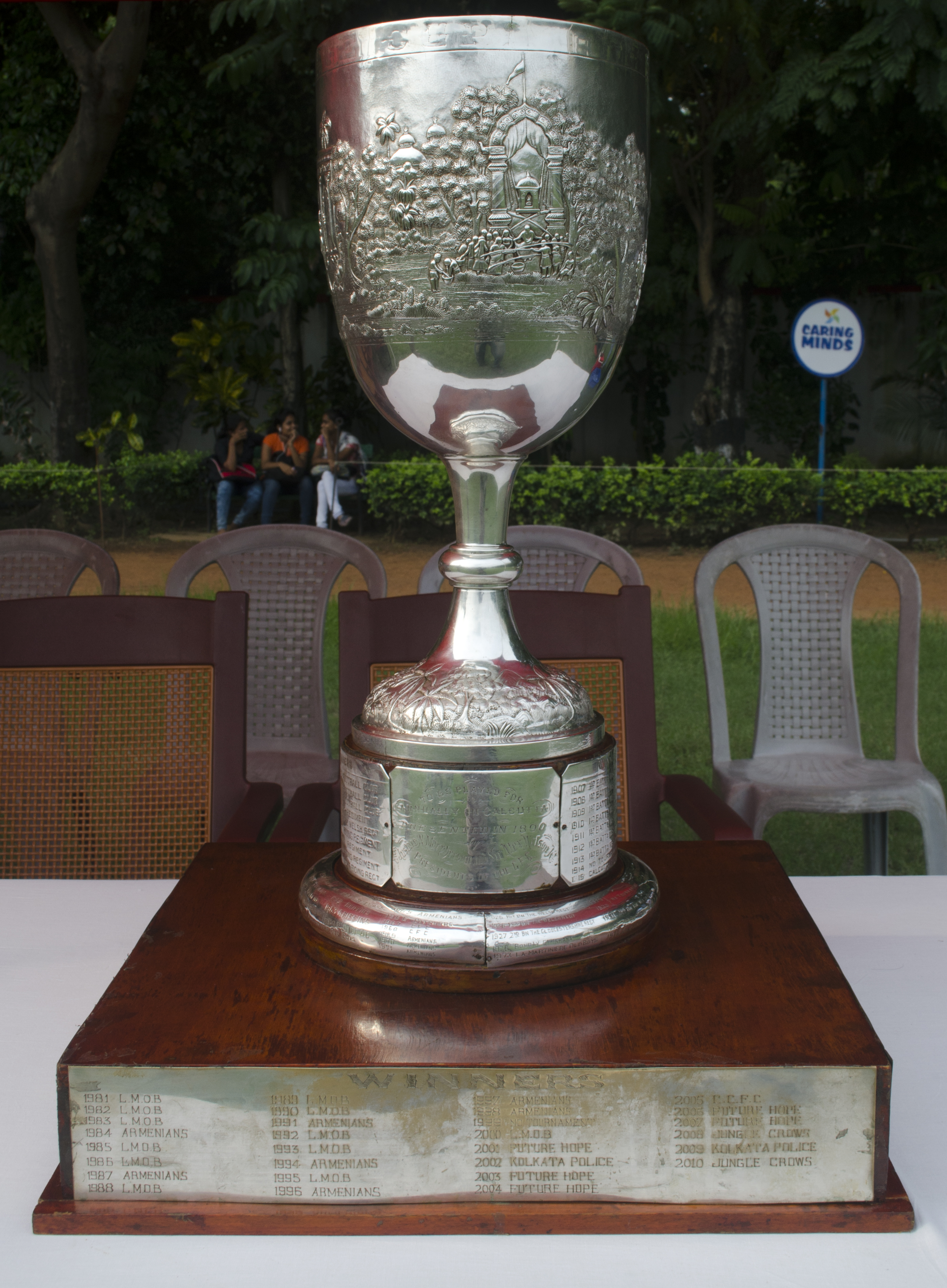
The Other Calcutta Cup Trophy

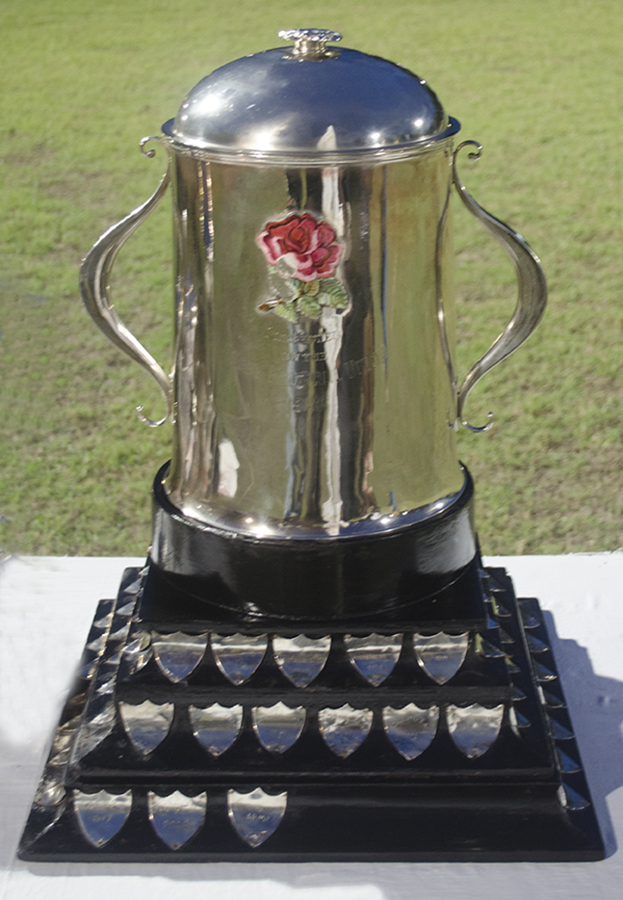
Champions Trophy of All India & South Asia Rugby Tournament

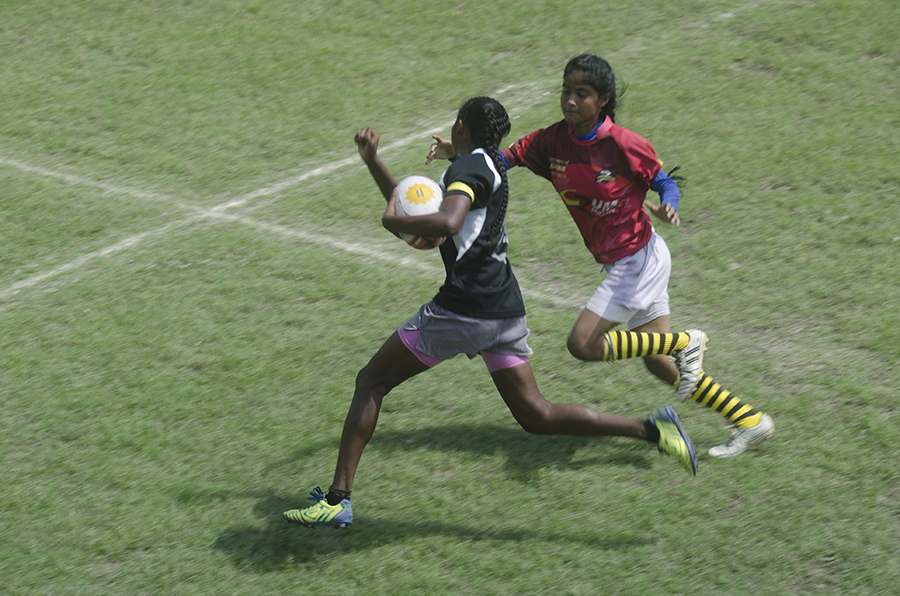
A women's rugby match in progress during the All India and South Asia Rugby Tournament

On Christmas Day 1872, a game of rugby, between 20 players representing England on the one side and 20 representing Scotland, Ireland and Wales on the other, was played in Calcutta.

The match was such a success that it was repeated a week later — the game of rugby had reached India. These lovers of rugby wanted to form a club in the area and the aforementioned matches were the agents which led to the formation of the Calcutta Football Club in January 1873.

The Calcutta Club joined the Rugby Football Union in 1874. Despite the Indian climate not being entirely suitable for playing rugby, the club prospered during that first year. However, when the free bar had to be discontinued, the membership took an appreciable drop. Other sports, such as tennis and polo, which were considered to be more suited to the local climate, were making inroads into the numbers of players available.

In 1877 the game declined and almost died out, leaving behind a full coffer. The wise G.A.J. Rothney, who had been acting as Captain, Hon. Secretary and Treasurer of the Club at that time, proposed that the funds should be devoted to the purchase of a cup of Indian workmanship to be offered to the Rugby Football Union- the parent body of the game worldwide. The withdrawal of these monies was done in the form of silver coins which were then melted to craft the exquisite Calcutta Cup.

The members decided to disband but keen to perpetuate the name of the club, they withdrew the club's funds from the bank; which were in Silver Rupees, had them melted down and made into a cup which they presented to the RFU in 1878, with the provision that it should be competed for annually.

The cup is of Indian workmanship, approximately 18 inches (45 cm) high, the body is finely engraved with three king cobras forming the handles. The domed lid is surmounted by an elephant which is, it is said, copied from the Viceroy's own stock and is complete with a howdah. The inscription on the Cup's wooden base reads: THE CALCUTTA CUP.

This historical legacy has not been universally well-received, in fact, Sean Smith, whose book The Union Game: A Rugby History accompanied the BBC TV series of the same name, has said of it that:

"It speaks volumes for the traditions of class prejudice in England and Scotland that the two countries play each year for a trophy made in the Raj."

=== The other Calcutta Cup ===
In 1884 Calcutta Cricket and Football Club (CC&FC) again set up a rugby section and in 1890 set up an inter club trophy, the Calcutta Rugby Union Challenge Cup, promptly christened the Calcutta Cup.

The cup is held by Jungle Crows who beat CC&FC. The second division trophy was won by Calcutta Cricket and Football Club Panthers.

=== All India and South Asia Rugby Tournament ===
The All India and South Asia Rugby Tournament is an amateur league competition for rugby union football clubs in India. The competition has been played since 1924. In 2016 12 team took part in the tournament and Army Red were the champions. For the first time women will be participating in the Rugby XVs, there were 6 teams.

=== 2010 Commonwealth Games - Delhi, India ===
Event	Gold	Silver	Bronze
Men's Rugby Sevens	New Zealand	Australia	South Africa

India is an active participant in the Commonwealth Sevens, and the 2010 Commonwealth Games, held in Delhi featured the sport.

== National teams ==
In June 2019, the India women's team registered their first victory in only their third-ever international match, when they defeated Singapore in the 2019 Asia Rugby Women's Championship. Team member Sweety Kumari, who was in excellent form during the tournament was declared as the 'International Young Player Of The Year' by Scrumqueens magazine.

== See also ==
- Rugby Premier League
- Indian Rugby Football Union
- India national rugby union team
- India national rugby sevens team
- India women's national rugby union team
- India women's national rugby sevens team
- Bangalore rugby football club
- Rahul Bose
- Sport in India

== Bibliography ==
- Bath, Richard, ed. (1997). Complete Book of Rugby. Seven Oaks Ltd. ISBN 1-86200-013-1.
- Levine, Emma A Game of Polo with a Headless Goat (ISBN 0233050418)
- Richards, Huw A Game for Hooligans: The History of Rugby Union (Mainstream Publishing, Edinburgh, 2007, ISBN 978-1-84596-255-5)
- Tony Collins (2006). "Schism 1893–1895". Rugby's great split: class, culture and the origins of rugby league football (2nd ed.). Routlage. ISBN 0-415-39616-6. Archived from the original on 3 May 2023.
- Smith, Sean The Union Game: A Rugby History
- Starmer-Smith, Nigel (ed) Rugby – A Way of Life, An Illustrated History of Rugby (Lennard Books, 1986 ISBN 0-7126-2662-X)
- "FROM THE VAULTS — IN 1877 THE RFU WERE SENT A LETTER…". worldrugbymuseum.com. 6 March 2017. Archived from the original on 4 February 2023.
- Mukherjee, Shayani (26 September 2016). "CCFC celebrates 225years of its existence with glory and pride". millenniumpost.in. Kolkata: The Millennium Post India. Archived from the original on 9 October 2023.
