= Samir Mohanty =

Samir Mohanty may refer to:

- Samir Mohanty (Jharkhand politician), born 1971
- Samir Mohanty (Odisha politician), born 1959
