= Odisha Rugby Football Association =

- Sport: Rugby union
- Founded: 1997
- President: Priyadarshi Mishra
- Men's coach: Manas Kumar Jena
- Website: indiarugby.com

The Odisha Rugby Football Association, abbreviated ("ORFA") is the governing body for rugby union in Odisha, India. It is a member of India Rugby Football Union with a seat on that body's Executive Council. The Odisha RFA is the administrative body of all the state teams, including men's and women's union and sevens teams.

== Administration ==
The following is the current organisational structure of Odisha Rugby Football Association (ORFA):

Position	Name
President	(India) Priyadarshi Mishra
Secretary	(India) Upendra Kumar Mohanty
Development Officer	(India) Manas Kumar Jena

== Bases ==
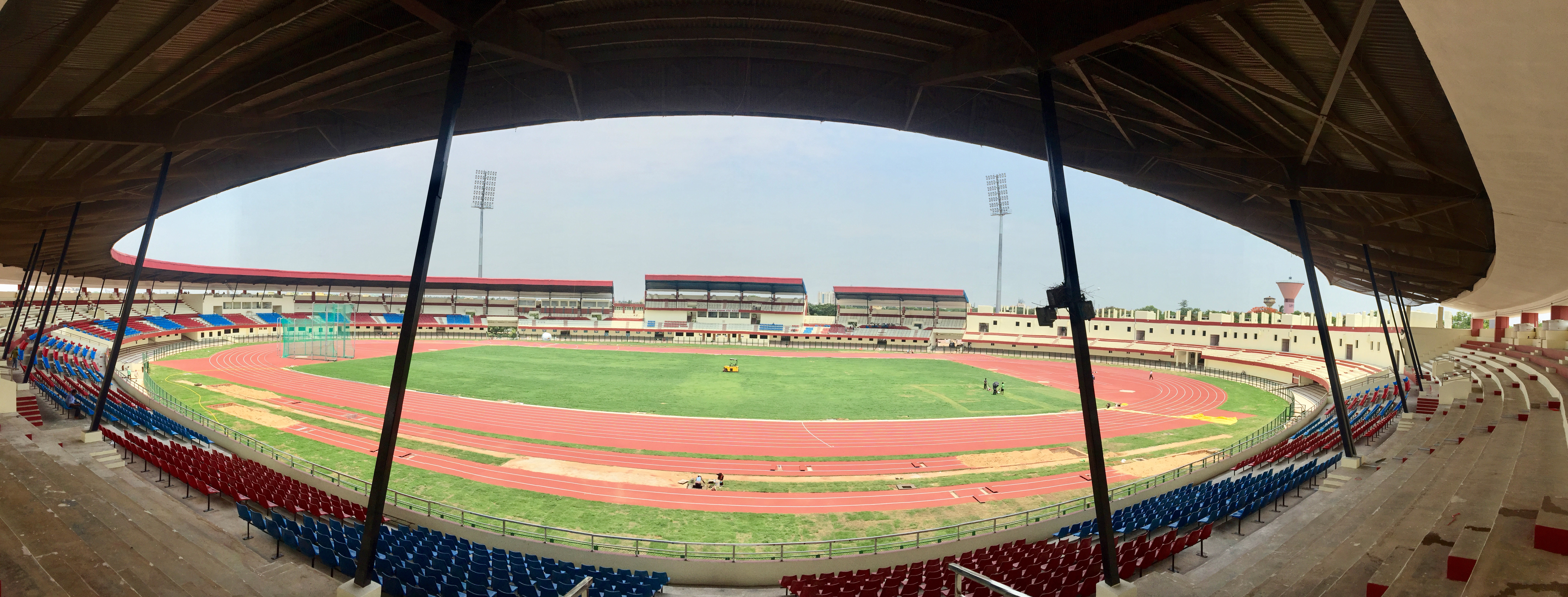
Kalinga Stadium

The Odisha Rugby Football Association (ORFA) has various bases across the state of Odisha; two of the main bases are Kalinga Stadium and KIIT Stadium in Bhubaneswar.

== Honours ==
=== Men ===
- Senior National Rugby 7's Championship

(bronze) Third Place (1): 2013

- Junior National Rugby 7's Championship

(gold) Winners (1): 2016
(bronze) Third Place (3): 2014 (KISS), 2018, 2019

- Junior National U19 Boys Rugby XV's Championship

(gold) Winners (1): 2014 (KISS)
(bronze) Third Place (1): 2015

- Callaghan Cup National Division 2 Men's Rugby XV's

(gold) Winners (1): 2014 (KISS)
(bronze) Third Place (1): 2014 (Bhubaneswar)

- All India Rugby 7s Inter University Games

(bronze) Third Place (1): 2018 (KIIT)

- All India Rugby XV's Inter University Games

(bronze) Third Place (1): 2018 (KIIT)

- SGFI School National U19 Boys Rugby 7's Championship

(gold) Winners (1): 2015

- SGFI School National U17 Boys Rugby 7's Championship

(silver) Runners-Up (3): 2015, 2016, 2018

- SGFI School National U14 Touch Rugby Championship

(gold) Winners (2): 2017, 2018

=== Women ===
- Senior National Rugby 7's Championship

(gold) Winners (5): 2013 (KISS), 2015, 2016, 2017, 2018
(silver) Runners-Up (2): 2014 (KISS), 2019

- All India Women's Rugby XV's Championship

(gold) Winners (3): 2016, 2018, 2019
(silver) Runners-Up (1): 2017

- National U19 Girls Rugby XVs Championship

(gold) Winners (1): 2018 (KISS)

- Junior National U18 Girls Rugby 7's Championship

(gold) Winners (2): 2014 (KISS), 2016
(silver) Third Place (2): 2017, 2018

- Rugby 7's Championship for Federation Cup

(gold) Winners (1): 2017

- National Games Rugby 7's

(gold) Winners (1): 2015

- Wheelchair Rugby Nationals

(silver) Runners-Up (1): 2019

- All India Rugby 7's Inter University Games

(gold) Winners (1): 2018 (KIIT)
(bronze) Third Place (1): 2018 (Utkal University)

- SGFI School National U19 Girls Rugby 7's Championship

(gold) Winners (2): 2015, 2018
(silver) Runners-Up (1): 2016

- SGFI School National U17 Girls Rugby 7's Championship

(gold) Winners (2): 2015, 2018

- SGFI School National U14 Touch Rugby Championship

(silver) Runners-Up (1): 2017

== See also ==
- Odisha rugby union team
- Odisha rugby sevens team
- Odisha women's rugby union team
- Odisha women's rugby sevens team
- Odisha Olympic Association
- India national rugby union team
- India women's national rugby union team
- India national rugby sevens team
