= Hrushikesha Mohanty =

- Hrushikesha Mohanty
- Born: August 6, 1956 (age 70); Bangalpur, Simulia, Balasore district, Odisha, India
- Citizenship: Indian
- Education: IIT Kharagpur
- Known for: Distributed computing, Computational Social Science, Odia literary commentaries
- Scientific career
- Fields: Computer Science, Distributed computing, Software engineering
- Workplaces: University of Hyderabad, KIIT University, ECIL

Hrushikesha Mohanty (born 6 August 1956) is an Indian computer scientist, academic administrator, and author who served as Vice-Chancellor of KIIT Deemed to be University (2017–2021) and professor at the School of Computer and Information Sciences, University of Hyderabad. Beyond his academic work in distributed computing, Mohanty is a writer and columnist in the Odia language.

== Background and career ==
Born in Odisha, Mohanty earned his Ph.D. from IIT Kharagpur, worked at ECIL, and later focused on distributed computing, software engineering, and computational social science at the University of Hyderabad before serving as VC of KIIT University.

== Literary work ==
Mohanty writes columns focusing on regional philosophy and culture, including his 2025 academic commentary and translation of works by Bhima Bhoi, *Stuti Chintamani Katha*. Additionally, he is a regular columnist for Odia daily newspapers, contributing a column titled "MoKatha" (ମୋ କଥା) for the Odia daily newspaper Nirvay. His columns present a variety of philosophical, socio-cultural commentaries, and topical observations on current events.

== Selected publications ==
=== Books ===
- Mohanty, H. (2025). Stuti Chintamani Katha Volume - I: A Commentary on Stuti Chintamani of Santha Kabi Kandha Bhima Bhoi with Translation of Stutis. Bhubaneswar: BK Publications. ISBN 978-8199134140.

=== Conference papers ===
- Pradhan, A. K., Mohanty, H., & Lal, R. P. (2025). "EventBoost: Enhancement of Twitter Event Detection Using Social Features and Word Embeddings". Proceedings of the 5th International Conference on Data Science, Machine Learning and Applications.
