= All India & South Asia Rugby Tournament =

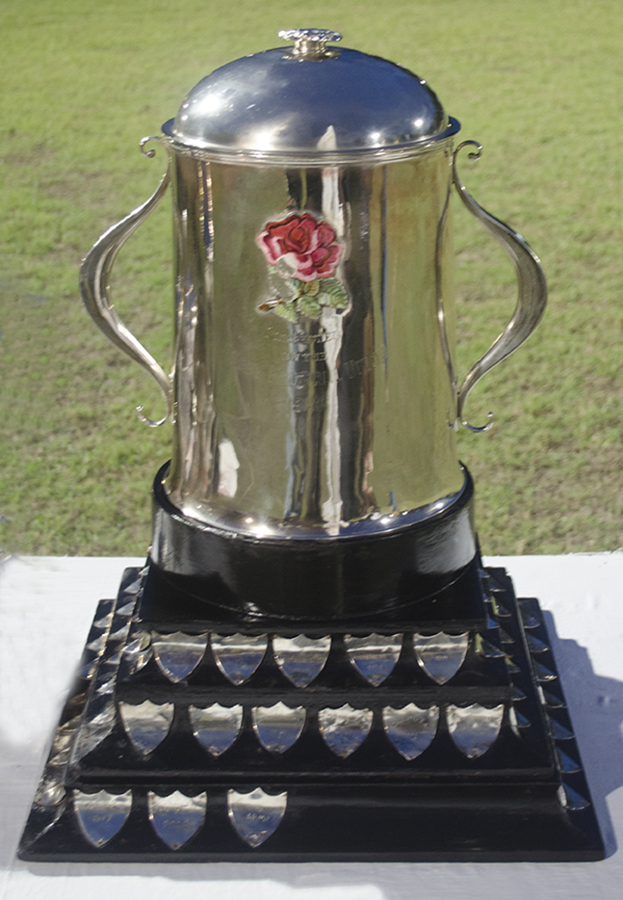
- Champions Trophy of All India & South Asia Rugby Tournament
- Sport: Rugby union
- Founded: 1924; 102 years ago
- No. of teams: 12
- Country: India
- Continent: Asia
- Most recent champion: Bombay Gymkhana (2023)
- Most titles: Bombay Gymkhana

The All India & South Asia Rugby Tournament is a league competition for rugby union clubs in India. The competition has been played since 1924. In 2017 ten teams took part in the men's edition, with Delhi Hurricanes securing the championship. The 2016 tournament also saw the first women's XVs rugby competition, with six teams participating, and the championship going to the team from the Odisha Rugby Football Association.

== History ==
After the Calcutta Cup and rugby union in India became popular the Rugby Football Union decided to give Calcutta Cricket and Football Club a similar cup, which was named the All India & South Asia Rugby Tournament. The cup has been played every year since.

In 2011 the tournament started to gain some publicity and soon after the cup began Army Red emerged as champions.

== 2018 qualifying teams ==
In 2018, the 85th All India & South Asia Rugby Tournament was held at Bombay Gymkhana grounds between 22 and 29 September with 10 teams competing in the men's category.

| Team (men's) | Rank | Location |
|---|---|---|
| Delhi Hurricanes | 1 | New Delhi |
| Army Red | 2 | Mumbai |
| Bombay Gymkhana | 3 | Mumbai |
| Jungle Crows | 4 | Kolkata |
| Calcutta CFC | 5 | Kolkata |
| Maharashtra State Police | 6 | Maharashtra |
| Magicians | 7 | Mumbai |
| Sergeant's Institute | 8 | Kolkata |
| Bangalore RFC | 9 | Bangalore |
| Bhubaneswar RFC | 10 | Bhubaneswar |

In the women's category there were 8 teams.

| Team (women's) | Rank | Location |
|---|---|---|
| Delhi Hurricanes | 1 | New Delhi |
| Odisha | 2 | Bhubaneswar |
| Rugby Association of Maharashtra | 3 | Mumbai |
| Bihar | 4 | Patna |
| Calcutta CFC | 5 | Kolkata |
| Adivasi | 6 | Kolkata |
| Haryana Bulls | 7 | Haryana |
| Magicians | 8 | Mumbai |

== 2017 qualifying teams ==
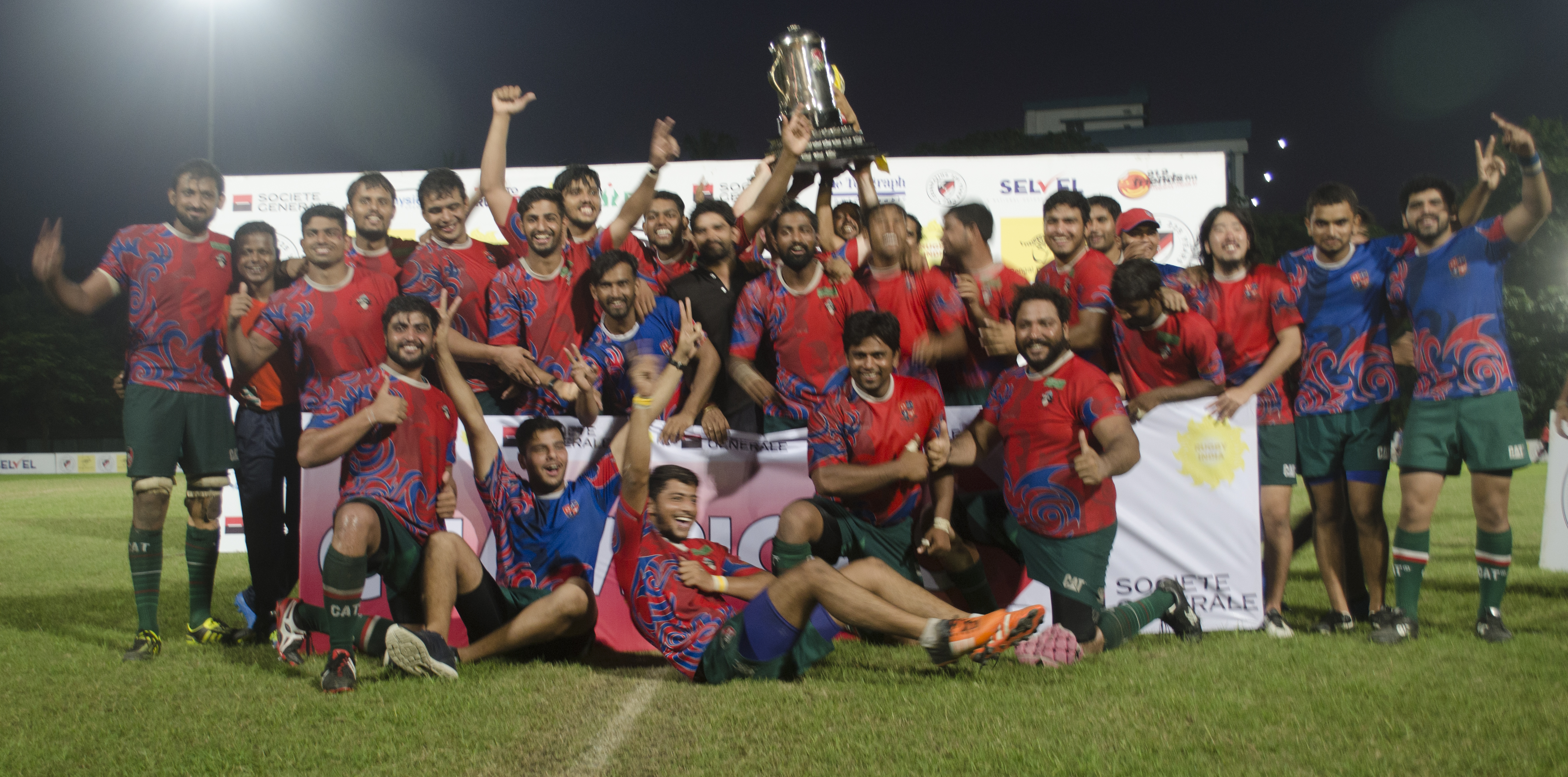
Men's champions, All India Rugby 2017

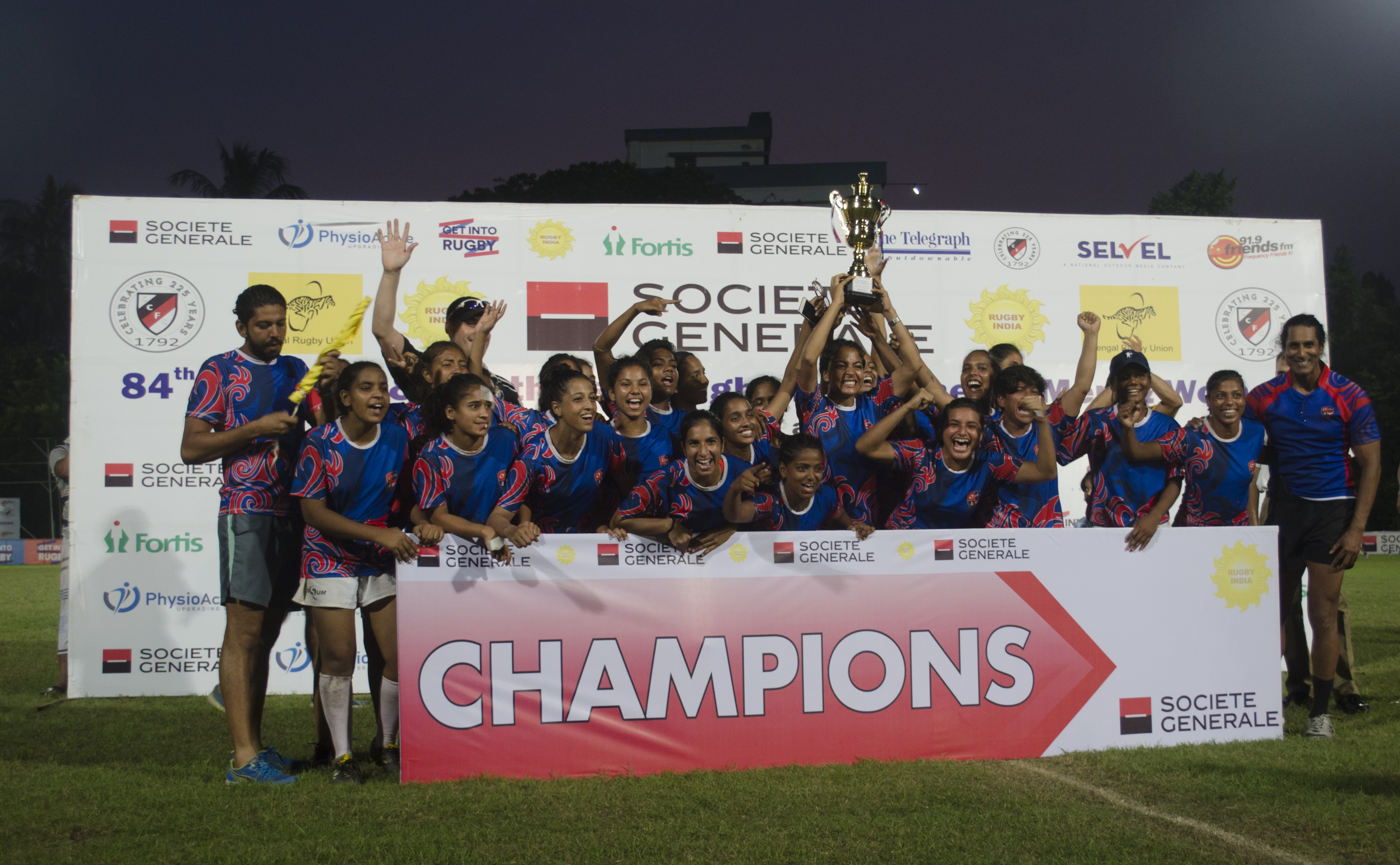
Women's champions, All India Rugby 2017

In 2017 the All India & South Asia Rugby Tournament was held at CCFC between 7 and 14 October, with 10 teams competing in the men's category.

| Team (men's) | Rank | Location |
|---|---|---|
| Army Red | 1 | Mumbai |
| Delhi Hurricanes | 2 | New Delhi |
| Bombay Gymkhana | 3 | Mumbai |
| Jungle Crows | 4 | Kolkata |
| Maharashtra State Police | 5 | Maharashtra |
| Calcutta CFC | 6 | Kolkata |
| Sergeant's Institute | 7 | Kolkata |
| Magicians | 8 | Mumbai |
| Kolkata Police | 9 | Kolkata |
| Delhi Rebels | 10 | Delhi |

In the women's category there were 8 teams.

| Team (women's) | Rank | Location |
|---|---|---|
| Odisha | 1 | Bhubaneswar |
| Delhi Hurricanes | 2 | New Delhi |
| Jungle Crows | 3 | Kolkata |
| Calcutta CFC | 4 | Kolkata |
| Rugby Association of Maharashtra | 5 | Mumbai |
| Bihar | 6 | Patna |
| Young Rugby Club | 7 | Kolkata |
| Adivasi | 8 | Kolkata |

== 2016 qualifying teams ==
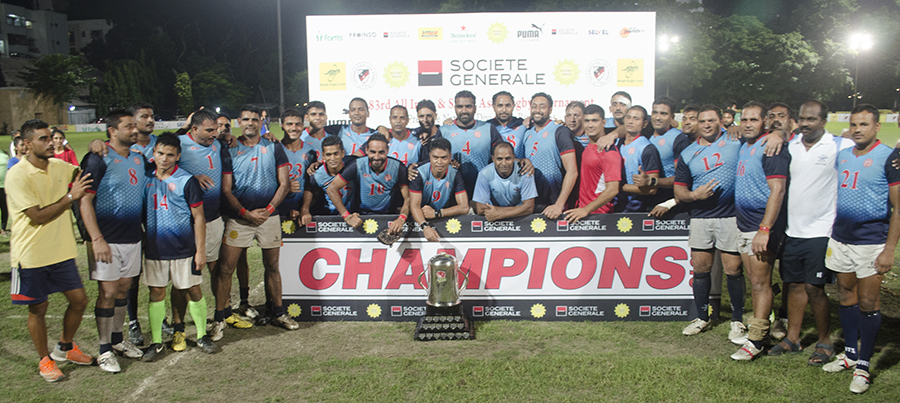
2016 champions Army Red, 83rd All India and South Asia Rugby Tournament

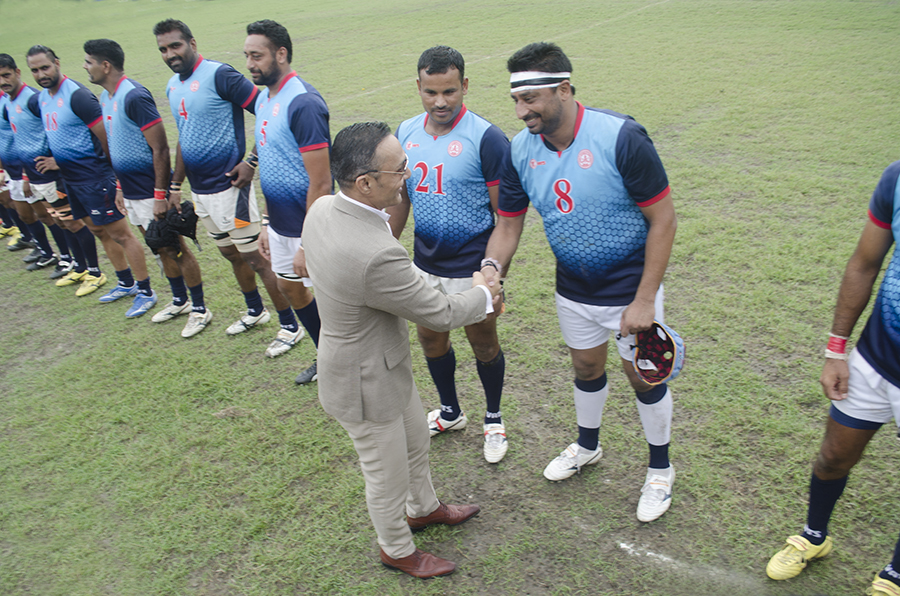
Actor and ex rugby player Rahul Bose is introduced to the players before the final

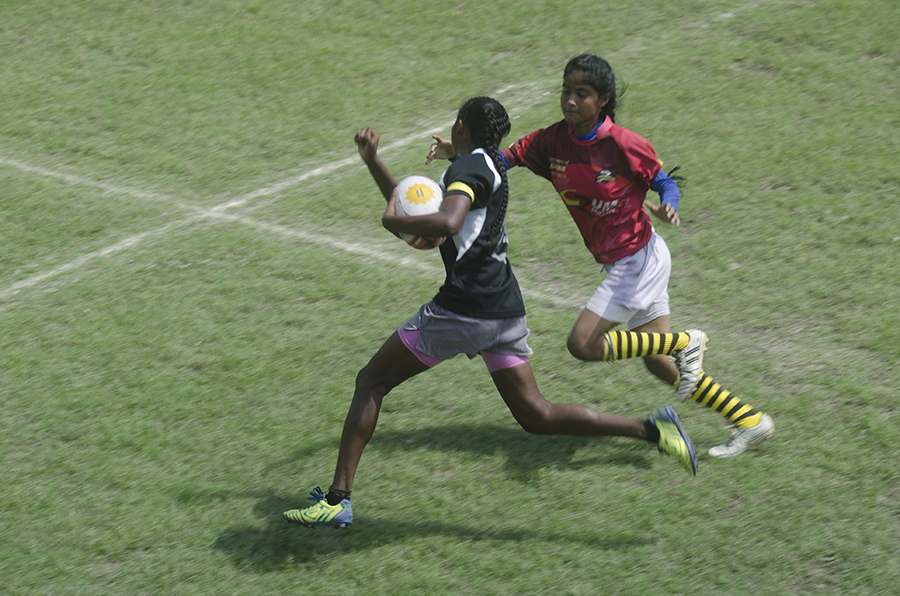
Women's match during the All India and South Asia Rugby Tournament

In 2016 the All India & South Asia Rugby Tournament was held at CCFC between 17 and 24 September, with 12 teams competing in the men's category.

| Team (men's) | Rank | Location |
|---|---|---|
| Army Red | 1 | Mumbai |
| Bombay Gymkhana | 2 | Mumbai |
| Delhi Hurricanes | 3 | New Delhi |
| Maharashtra State Police | 4 | Maharashtra |
| Jungle Crows | 5 | Kolkata |
| Calcutta CFC | 6 | Kolkata |
| Bangalore RFC | 7 | Bangalore |
| Bhubaneswar RFC | 8 | Bhubaneswar |
| Young Rugby Club | 9 | Kolkata |
| Kolkata Police | 10 | Kolkata |
| Mumbai Magicians | 11 | Mumbai |
| Delhi Lions | 12 | New Delhi |

For the first time women competed in a rugby XVs tournament, with six teams participating.

| Team (women's) | Pool | Location |
|---|---|---|
| Jungle Crows | A | Kolkata |
| Young Rugby Club | A | Kolkata |
| Odisha | A | Odisha |
| Calcutta CFC | B | Kolkata |
| Bihar | B | Bihar |
| Delhi Lions | B | New Delhi |

== 2015 qualifying teams ==
2015 All India & South Asia Rugby Tournament teams

| Team | Location |
|---|---|
| Army Green | Mumbai |
| Army Red | Mumbai |
| Bombay Gymkhana | Mumbai |
| Calcutta Cricket & Football Club | Kolkata |
| Delhi Hurricanes | New Delhi |
| Jungle Crows | Kolkata |
| KISS RFC | Bhubaneswar |
| Bangalore RFC | Bangalore |
| Maharashtra State Police | Maharashtra |
| Kolkata Police | Kolkata |
| Young Rugby Club | Kolkata |
| Bhubaneswar RFC | Bhubaneswar |
| Chhattisgarh RFC | Chhattisgarh |

== Results ==
Champions of the All India & South Asia Rugby Tournament since 2000.

Men's All India & South Asia Rugby Tournament
Year
| Year | Champion | Runner up | Score |
|---|---|---|---|
| Year | 2000 | Bombay Gymkhana | |
| 2001 | Old Peterites SC (Sri Lanka) | Bombay Gymkhana | |
| 2003 | Sri Lanka Police SC | Bombay Gymkhana | |
| 2004 | Chennai Cheetahs | | |
| 2005 | British Asian Rugby Association (United Kingdom) | Bangalore RFC | 27-3 |
| 2006 | Chennai Cheetahs | Kolkata Police | 52-9 |
| 2007 | Army Red | Chennai Cheetahs | 12-5 |
| 2009 | Army Red | Chennai Cheetahs | Uzbekistan |
| 2010 | Army Red | Chennai Cheetahs | |
| 2011 | Army Red | Bombay Gymkhana | |
| 2012 | Army Red | Bombay Gymkhana | 7-0 |
| 2013 | Army Red, Bombay Gymkhana | | 10-10 |
| 2014 | Army Red | Delhi Hurricanes | 18-0 |
| 2015 | Army Red | Bombay Gymkhana | |
| 2016 | Army Red | Delhi Hurricanes | 18-5 |
| 2017 | Delhi Hurricanes | Army Red | 25-24 |
| 2018 | Delhi Hurricanes | Bombay Gymkhana | |
| 2019 | Delhi Hurricanes | Bombay Gymkhana | 26-6 |
| 2020 | | | |
| 2021 | Jungle Crows | Calcutta Cricket & Football Club | |
| 2022 | Bombay Gymkhana | Army Red | 14-10 |
| 2023 | Bombay Gymkhana | | |
| 2024 | Delhi Hurricanes | Bombay Gymkhana | 14-10 |
| 2025 | Bombay Gymkhana | Calcutta Cricket & Football Club | 40-17 |

Champions of the Women's All India & South Asia Rugby Tournament since its inaugural version in 2016.

Women's All India & South Asia Rugby Tournament
Year
| Year | Champion | Runner up | Score | |
|---|---|---|---|---|
| Year | 2016 | Odisha | Delhi Hurricanes | 20 - 0 |
| 2017 | Delhi Hurricanes | Odisha | 19 - 0 | |
| 2018 | Odisha | Delhi Hurricanes | 10 - 5 | |

== See also ==
- Rugby Premier League
