= Odisha Olympic Association =

- Abbreviation: OOA
- Formation: 1946; 80 years ago
- Type: Sports Association
- Headquarters: Cuttack, Odisha
- Members: Indian Olympic Association; Olympic Council of Asia
- President: Jaga Mohan Patnaik
- Secretary General: Avijit Paul
- Website: www.olympic.ind.in

The Odisha Olympic Association (OOA) is the governing body of sports in Odisha. It is responsible for selecting athletes to represent India at the Olympic Games, Commonwealth Games, Asian Games and National Games of India.

== History ==
The history of organised sports in Odisha traces its origins to 1904, when Madhusudan Das formed the Orissa Sports Association. It was an athletic institution which organised the sports competitions for seasonal and annual provincial games. It eventually became the Orissa Athletic Association in 1909 and remained the primary sports association in the province until the formation of Orissa Olympic Association in 1946. Harekrushna Mahatab became the first President of OOA and Bhairab Chandra Mohanty became the first secretary.

The OOA decided to empower sports associations such as cricket, football, hockey, tennis and badminton in 1961, thus paving the way for formation of independent sports bodies for the governance of sports in Odisha.

== OOA Executive Council ==
The OOA Executive Committee for the 2020–24 term:

Designation	Name	Sports Association/Olympic Committee
President	Jaga Mohan Patnaik	Kalahandi District Athletic Association
Vice-Presidents	Kamala Kanta Pandey	Kandhamal District Athletic Association
Vice-Presidents	Pratap Satpathy	Hockey Odisha
Vice-Presidents	Kishore Kumar Biswal	Mayurbhanj District Athletic Association
Vice-Presidents	Nalini Kumar Das	Dhenkanal District Athletic Association
Vice-Presidents	Anup Kumar Patra	Koraput District Athletic Association
Vice-Presidents	Dulal Chandra Pradhan	Sambalpur District Athletic Association
Secretary General	Avijit Paul	Football Association of Odisha
Treasurer	Adhip Das	Odisha Athletic Association
Joint Secretaries	Ashok Kumar Sahu	Ganjam District Athletic Association
Joint Secretaries	Prabhat Kumar Bhol	Sundargarh District Athletic Association
Council Members	Sarat Kumar Sahoo	Odisha Kabaddi Association
Council Members	Anil Kumar Bohidar	Odisha Amateur Boxing Association
Council Members	Narayan Sahu	Odisha Weightlifting Association
Council Members	Rabi Shankar Pratihari	Puri District Athletic Association
Council Members	Janardhan Dash	Keonjhar District Athletic Association
Council Members	Birendra Kumar Behera	Odisha State Handball Association
Council Members	Hariprasad Patnaik	Odisha State Karate-Do Association
Council Members	Kishore Kumar Mishra	Bargarh District Athletic Association
Council Members	Debendra Kumar Sahoo	Odisha Wrestling Association
Council Members	Bijay Kumar Behera	Jharsuguda District Athletic Association
Council Members	Ashok Kumar Sahoo	Odisha Gymnastic Association

== OOA Sports Associations ==
Sport	Association
Aquatics	Odisha Swimming Association
Archery	Odisha Archery Association
Arm Wrestling	Odisha Arm Wrestling Association
Athletics	Odisha Athletics Association; Odisha Veteran Athletic Association; State School Athletic Association
Badminton	Odisha State Badminton Association; Ball Badminton Association of Odisha
Baseball	Baseball Association of Odisha
Basketball	Odisha Basketball Association
Billiards	Billiards & Snooker Association of Odisha
Boxing	Odisha Amateur Boxing Association
Canoeing	Odisha Kayaking and Canoeing Association
Carrom	Odisha State Carrom Association
Cricket	Odisha Cricket Association
Cycling	Odisha Cycling Association
Fencing	Odisha Fencing Association
Football	Football Association of Odisha
Golf	Bhubaneswar Golf Club
Gymnastics	Odisha Gymnastic Association
Handball	Odisha Handball Association
Hockey	Hockey Odisha
Judo	Odisha Amateur Judo Association
Kabaddi	Odisha Kabaddi Association
Karate	Odisha State Karate-Do Association
Kho Kho	Odisha Kho-Kho Association
Kickboxing	Amateur Kickboxing Association of Odisha
Kurfball	Odisha State Kurfball Association
Mallakhamb	Odisha Mallakhamb Association
MuayThai	Odisha MuayThai Union
Netball	Odisha Netball Association
Roller Skating	Roller Skating Association of Odisha
Rowing	Odisha Association of Rowing and Sculling
Rugby	Odisha Rugby Football Association
Sailing	Odisha Yachting Association
Sepak Takraw	Odisha State Sepak Takraw Association
Shooting	Odisha Rifle Association
Squash	Odisha Squash Association
Softball	Odisha Softball Association
Sumo	Odisha Sumo Association
Table Tennis	Odisha State Table Tennis Association
Taekwando	Odisha Taekwando Association
Tennikoit	Odisha Amateur Tennikoit Association
Tennis	Odisha Tennis Association
Throwball	Odisha State Throwball Association
Tug of War	Odisha Amateur Tug of War Association
Volleyball	Odisha Volleyball Association
Weightlifting	Odisha Weightlifting Association
Wrestling	Odisha Wrestling Association; All Odisha Indian Style Wrestling Association
Wushu	Wushu Association of Odisha

== Subsidiaries ==
- Odisha Association of Blind (Bhubaneswar)
- Odisha State Association of Deaf (Bhubaneswar)

== See also ==
- India at the Olympics
- Sport in India
- Sports in Odisha
