= Samir Mohanty (Odisha politician) =

Indian politician

President of Odisha Olympic Association
- Incumbent
- Assumed office 19 March 2025
- Preceded by: Jagamohan Pattnaik

President of Bharatiya Janata Party, Odisha
- In office 16 January 2020 – 23 March 2023
- Preceded by: Basanta Kumar Panda
- Succeeded by: Manmohan Samal

Personal details
- Born: 31 May 1959 (age 67) Cuttack, Odisha, India
- Party: Bharatiya Janata Party
- Spouse: Dipti Mohanty (m. 1991)
- Children: 2 Sons
- Parents: Bimal Charan Mohanty (father); Sailabala Mohanty (mother)
- Education: Bachelor of Arts; Bachelor of Laws; Utkal University
- Profession: Politician

Samir Mohanty, also known as Anirudh Mohanty (born 31 May 1959), is an Indian politician, sports administrator, and social worker from Odisha. A senior leader of the Bharatiya Janata Party (BJP), he served as the State President of the Bharatiya Janata Party – Odisha from 2020 to 2023. Since 2025, he has served as the President of the Odisha Olympic Association. Over four decades of public life, Mohanty has also contributed significantly to the cooperative movement, technical education, and labor unions in Odisha.

== Political career ==
Mohanty was a student leader of Akhil Bharatiya Vidyarthi Parishad (ABVP) before becoming a full-time politician. He transitioned from student politics into youth wing organizational work in 1984, when he was appointed Secretary of the Bharatiya Janata Yuva Morcha (BJYM) in Odisha. Between 1996 and 2000, he served two consecutive terms as Vice-President of the BJP Bhubaneswar District/Head Office, worked as Secretary-in-Charge of the BJP Odisha State Unit.

In 2003, Mohanty was elected as a municipal councillor representing Ward No. 43 in the Bhubaneswar Municipal Corporation (BMC), serving until 2008. Alongside municipal governance, Mohanty was appointed President of the Odisha State Cooperative Housing Corporation Ltd. (2003–2004). He subsequently served as the President of the Odisha Khadi & Village Industries Board (KVIB) from 2006 to 2009, and was later nominated as a member of the National Khadi Board from 2017 to 2020.

Mohanty served as a State Executive Member of the BJP and District Prabhari for Ganjam between 2009 and 2014. He was subsequently elevated to Vice-President of the BJP Odisha State Unit from 2015 to 2019. On 16 January 2020, Mohanty was elected unopposed as the President of the BJP Odisha State Unit, succeeding Basanta Kumar Panda. He led the state party apparatus until March 2023. During the 2024 Odisha Legislative Assembly and general elections, he served as a key campaign strategist and spokesperson for the party.
