= Bangalore RFC =

(India) Bangalore Rugby Football Club
- Full name: Bangalore Rugby Football Club
- Founded: 1996
- Location: Bangalore, Karnataka, India
- Ground: RBANMS College grounds
- Coach(es): (India) Subash Janarthanam (India) Tarun Appanna (Scotland) Steven Burton
- Captain: (India) Akhil Anand
- League(s): All India & South Asia Rugby Tournament; National Rugby Championship

Bangalore Rugby Football Club (B.R.F.C) is a rugby union club based in Bangalore. They currently participate in the All India & South Asia Rugby Tournament & the National Rugby Championship - Div 1.

== History ==
B.R.F.C was founded in 1996 by expats living in the city. They also have an expatriate team called the "Bangalore Refugees". They started a girls team in 2009, in addition to boys u-19 and u-16 teams. B.R.F.C has provided several players to the India national team over the years: Subramani P.E, Vinay Rai, Puneeth Krishnamurthy, Tarun Appanna, Thaman Thimaiah, Roshan Lobo, Salik Zaffar, Deepam Kohli and Nishant Nerayath. B.R.F.C in 2005 reached the finals of the All India & South Asia Rugby Tournament and lost the finals to British Asian Rugby Association.

== See also ==
- Bengaluru Bravehearts
