= Rugby India =

Indian sports body

- Sport: Rugby union
- Founded: 1998; 28 years ago
- World Rugby affiliation: 1999
- Asia Rugby affiliation: 1998
- President: Rahul Bose
- Men's coach: Waisale Serevi
- Women's coach: Waisale Serevi
- Website: www.rugbyindia.in

The Indian Rugby Football Union (IRFU), also known as Rugby India, is the governing body for sport of rugby union in India. It is headquartered in Mumbai, Maharashtra. The federation was founded in 1998 and it became affiliated to World Rugby in 1999. It is recognized by Ministry of Youth Affairs and Sports.

Rugby India administers all India national teams: men's, women's, men's sevens and women's sevens. It also manages both U20 national teams.

== History ==
Rugby Union in India dates back to a scratch match or two played in Calcutta and Madras during the visit of MS Galatea in 1871 during the British Raj. The first recorded match was played on Christmas Day 1872, at CFC Ground in Calcutta, it was played between England and a combined team of Scotland, Ireland and Wales. In the early days the Indian clubs joined England's Rugby Football Union but due to the British Army regiments leaving, local interest in rugby dropped leading to Calcutta RFC disbanding in 1878, with the silver rupees representing the club's assets being melted down to become the Calcutta Cup that was presented to the RFU.

In 1970, an All-India Rugby Football Union was founded and sent a representative team, made of half-Europeans and half-Indians, on a tour of Ceylon. Despite this, by the 1990s, the only two recognised rugby clubs in India were Bombay Gymkhana and Calcutta Cricket and Football Club. In 1998 the India Rugby Football Union was founded and in 1999 the IFRU gained association from the International Rugby Board. For most of the 2000s, they were reliant on overseas players with Indian ancestry. In March 2019, former South African player Naas Botha became coach of national team. He accepted the job for short term. In 2022, the India Rugby President, Rahul Bose announced plans to introduce payments to India national rugby team players.

Rugby India (RI) organised the Asian Rugby under 18 tournament in 2018 at Kalinga Stadium, Bhubaneswar, Odisha. In the tournament 14 nations participated and India finished on 4th position.

== State associations ==
State Associations affiliated with the IRFU.

=== State/UT members ===
No.	Association	State/UT	Reg. year
1	Rugby Football Association Andaman Nicobar	Andaman and Nicobar Islands	2021
2	Andhra Pradesh Rugby Association	Andhra Pradesh	2016
3	Rugby Association of Assam	Assam	2006
4	Rugby Football Association of Bihar	Bihar	2017
5	Chandigarh Rugby Football Association	Chandigarh	2001
6	Chhattisgarh Rugby Football Association	Chhattisgarh	2004
7	Rugby Association of Dadra & Nagar Haveli and Daman & Diu	Dadra & Nagar Haveli and Daman & Diu	2024
8	Rugby Association of Delhi	Delhi	2019
9	Goa Rugby Union	Goa	2018
10	Rugby Football Association of Gujarat	Gujarat	2015
11	Haryana State Rugby Football Association	Haryana	2009
12	Himachal Pradesh Rugby Association	Himachal Pradesh	2025
13	Jammu & Kashmir Rugby Association	Jammu and Kashmir	2021
14	Jharkhand Rugby football Association	Jharkhand	2022
15	Karnataka Rugby Football Union	Karnataka	2006
16	State Rugby Association – Kerala	Kerala	2015
17	Rugby Football Association – Madhya Pradesh	Madhya Pradesh	2020
18	Rugby Association of Maharashtra	Maharashtra	2010
19	Amateur Rugby Association of Manipur	Manipur	2001
20	Odisha Rugby Football Association	Odisha	1998
21	Puducherry Amateur Rugby Football Association	Puducherry	2018
22	Rugby Association – Punjab	Punjab	2015
23	Rajasthan Rugby Association	Rajasthan	2023
24	Tamil Nadu Rugby Football Union	Tamil Nadu	2000
25	Telangana Rugby Association	Telangana	2017
26	Rugby Football Association Uttar Pradesh	Uttar Pradesh	2022
27	Uttarakhand Rugby Association	Uttarakhand	2021
28	Bengal Rugby-Football Union	West Bengal	2001

=== Other members ===
No.	Association	Department	President
1	Services Sports Control Board	Indian Armed Forces	Dinesh Suri

== Coaching staff ==
- Head coach: Waisale Serevi

== See also ==
- Rugby union in India
- History of rugby union
- Sport in India
- All India & South Asia Rugby Tournament
