= Kalinga Institute of Industrial Technology =

Indian university

Kalinga Institute of Industrial Technology (Deemed to be University)
- Type: Private (Deemed university)
- Established: 1992 (34 years ago)
- Founder: Achyuta Samanta
- Affiliations: UGC, NAAC, NMC, ABET, ACU
- Chancellor: Ashok Kumar Parija
- Vice-Chancellor: Dr. Saranjit Singh
- Faculty: 2,500
- Students: 30,000 (Undergraduates and Postgraduates)
- Location: Bhubaneswar, Odisha, India; 20°21′10″N 85°49′10″E
- Campus: 200 acres (0.81 km^{2}), Urban
- Website: kiit.ac.in

Kalinga Institute of Industrial Technology (Deemed to be University) is a private deemed university located in Bhubaneswar, Odisha, India. It offers 34 undergraduate, 32 postgraduate, 10 integrated, 11 Ph.D programmes in the fields of science and engineering, medical science, management, law, film and media, humanities and yoga and sports.

It was founded in 1992 as Industrial Training Institute in Bhubaneswar with a seed capital of ₹5,000. It is part of KIIT Society which is estimated to be worth ₹10,000 crore (US$1.3 billion) as of 2020.

== History ==
KIIT was established in 1992 as an Industrial Training Institute with only twelve students and two faculty. This institution was the brainchild of Achyuta Samanta who had envisioned a profound centre of learning in India and so pursued to lay the foundation of KIIT. In 1997, the School of Technology and the School of Computer Application was established. In 2004 it was conferred the status of deemed university and renamed KIIT University.

The KIIT School of Biotechnology, School of Rural Management, School of Medicine and KIIT Law School were started in 2007.

In 2017, the institute was renamed back Kalinga Institute of Industrial Technology, following a request from all institutes deemed to be universities not to use "University" in their title.

== Campus ==
The institute is located in clusters of 12 urban campuses, totalling around 200 acres (0.81 km^{2}) in the temple city of Bhubaneswar.

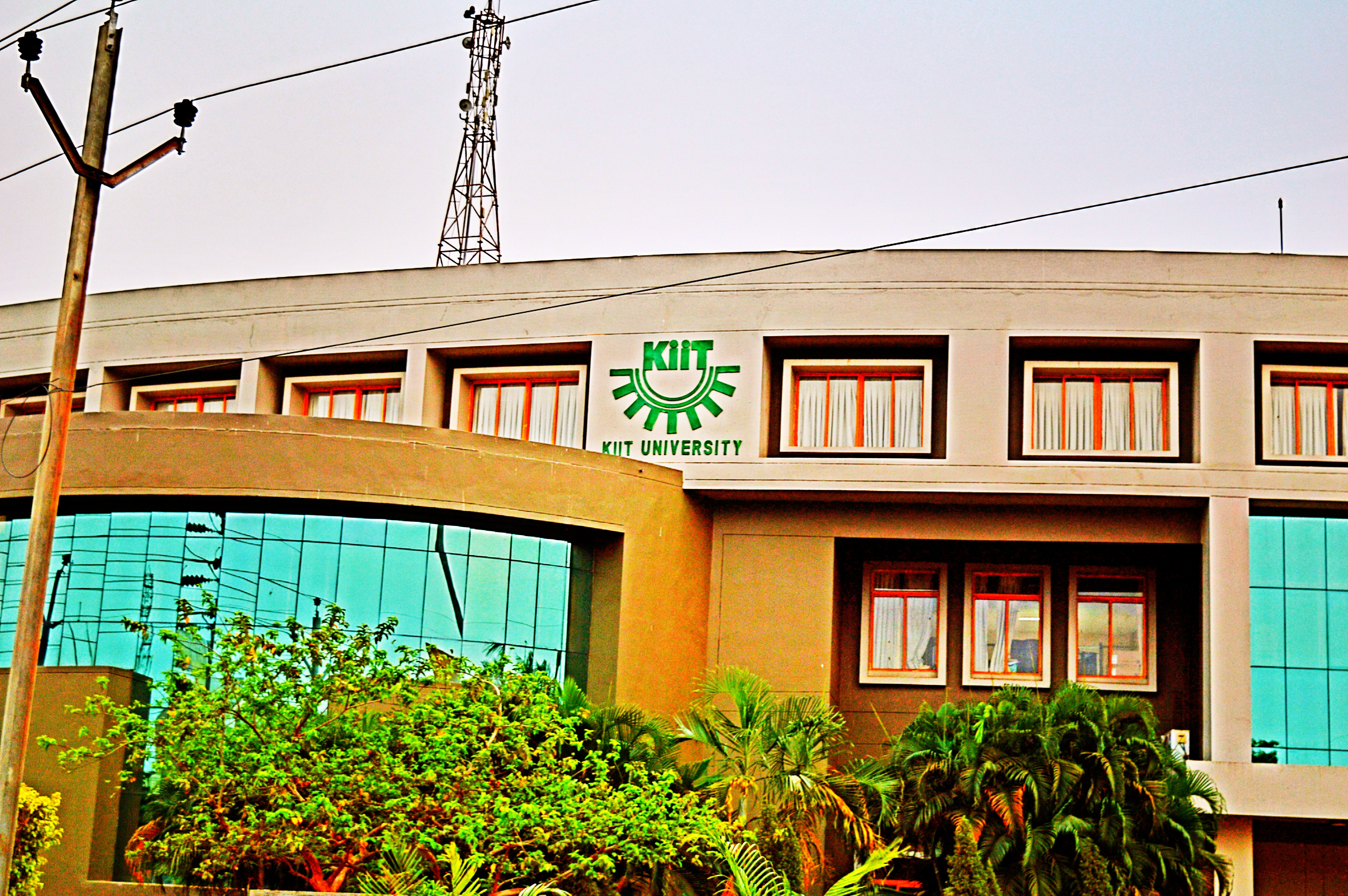
Central library of the institute

== Academics ==
KIIT has 30,000 students. Each academic program is functioning in different independent campuses.

=== Accreditation ===
KIIT was accredited by National Assessment and Accreditation Council (NAAC) with an A grade with a score of 3.48 out of 4 points. KIIT is a member of Association of Commonwealth Universities (ACU). Accreditation Board for Engineering and Technology (ABET), USA, has accredited KIIT Deemed to be University’s six engineering programmes, ABET regarded as the ‘gold standard' for engineering education.

=== Admission ===
Admission to undergraduate and postgraduate programs are primarily done through the institute's entrance examination KIITEE (KIIT Entrance Examination). Admission to the MTech program are also granted through GATE. Students are admitted to the law school through a written all India common test known as KLSAT (KIIT Law School Admission Test). As this is a private university, admission to MBBS and BDS courses are done through donations only. For the newly introduced courses of fashion, film studies, journalism and sculpturing the admission will be done on the basis of merit of previous qualifying examinations, donations and additional experiences related to the concerned disciplines.

=== Scholarship ===
The University offers eight distinct scholarship and financial assistance programs designed to support meritorious and economically disadvantaged students across undergraduate and postgraduate levels. The Tuition Fee Waiver Scheme reserves up to 5 percent of B.Tech seats for BPL card holders, providing complete tuition fee exemption while other fees remain the student's responsibility. The KIITEE Merit Scholarship rewards the top-ranking candidate with free education for the entire B.Tech program and extends partial scholarships to the top 1000 rank holders who have attained at least 60 percent in Physics, Chemistry, and Mathematics.

For international students, the KIIT International Scholarship program allocates 100 scholarships globally, offering full tuition fee waivers to two students per country and half waivers to ten students per country. The university recognizes academic excellence through its Merit Scholarship, which awards semester toppers based on CGPA for six-month periods. There is a specialized Prakriti Lamsal Memorial Scholarship which targets meritorious girl students from Nepal.

At the Postgraduate Level, M.Tech students can participate in a Teaching Assistantship program that provides income while offering teaching or research experience through a flexible award system managed by the university. PhD scholars receive monthly financial support of 20,000, enabling full-time research pursuits. Both PhD and M.Tech students have access to a Contingency Fund of 50,000 for unexpected financial needs.

=== Rankings ===
University rankings

General – international
- QS (Asia) (2023): 401–500
- Times (World) (2023): 601–800
- Times (Asia) (2022): 201–250
- Times (Emerging) (2022): 201–250

General – India
- NIRF (Overall) (2021): 34
- NIRF (Universities) (2021): 20

Engineering – India
- NIRF (2021): 42

Medical – India
- NIRF (2021): 30

Law – India
- NIRF (2021): 11

Business/Management – India
- NIRF (2021): 48

Internationally, KIIT was ranked 401–500 in Asia on the QS World University Rankings of 2023. It was ranked 601–800 in the world by the Times Higher Education World University Rankings of 2023, 201–250 in Asia in 2022 and in the same band among emerging economies.

In India, it was ranked 42nd among engineering colleges by the National Institutional Ranking Framework (NIRF) in 2022, 20th among all universities and 34th overall. NIRF also ranked it 48th in the management ranking, 30th in medical ranking and 11th in law ranking. KIIT ranked 1st in India in the 2020 ARIIA Ranking published by the MHRD under the 'Private or Self-Financed Universities' category. In the NIRF Rankings announced on 11 June 2020, KIIT's rank improved to 44th from 50th in the Overall category, while it was ranked 24th in the rank for University.

== Schools ==
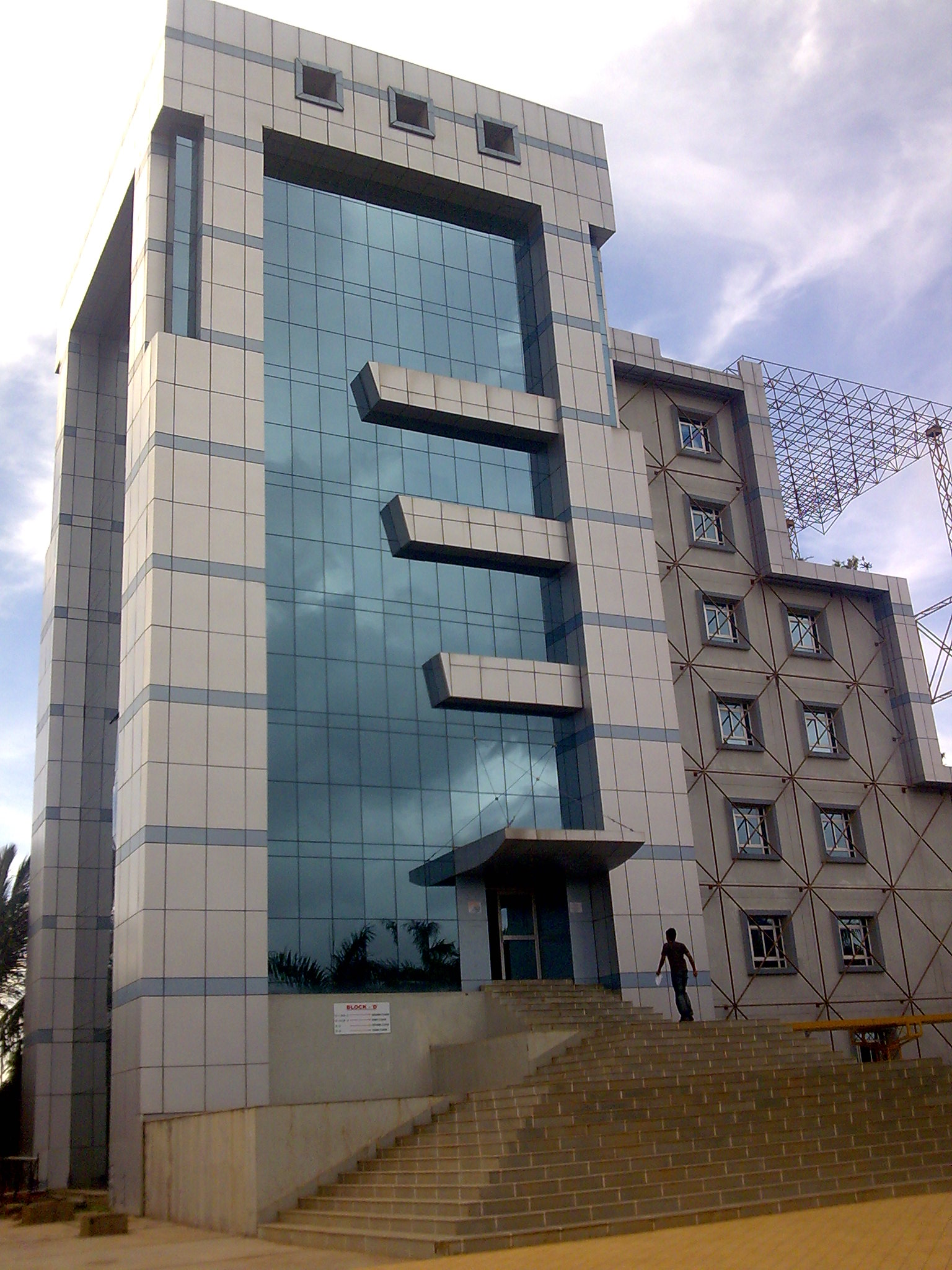
KIIT School of Technology 1st year block

KIIT offers more than 100 programs in the following schools:

- Science and Engineering

- School of Computer Application (KSCA)
- School of Civil Engineering
- School of Mechanical Engineering
- School of Electrical Engineering
- School of Computer Engineering
- School of Chemical Technology
- School of Electronics Engineering
- School of Biotechnology (KSBT)
- School of Applied Sciences
- School of Architecture and Planning
- School of Mechatronics Engineering

- Management

- School of Management (KSOM), established in 1993
- School of Rural Management (KSRM), established in 2006, offers courses in Rural management
- School of Commerce and Economics

- Law

- School of Law
- School of Leadership

- Medicine

- Kalinga Institute of Medical Sciences (KIMS)
- Kalinga Institute of Dental Sciences (KIDS)
- Kalinga Institute of Nursing Sciences (KINS)
- School of Public Health

- Film & Media

- School of Film & Media Sciences
- School of Fashion Technology
- School of Mass Communication

- Humanities

- School of Humanities
- School of Buddhist Studies
- School of Languages
- School of Fine Art

Yoga & Sports

- School of Yoga & Spiritualism
- School of Sports

KIIT will be one of the first educational institutions in India to have chess as part of the curriculum, with a programme to start in the 2021-22 educational year.

== Research ==
KIIT has a Research and Development wing headed by a director along with other qualified faculty members who collaborate with various Research Organizations. Faculty members are currently pursuing research funded by organizations, such as, the Department of Science and Technology (DST), the Department of Atomic Energy (DAE) and Council of Scientific and Industrial Research (CSIR). Industry Institute interactions are also being pursued through various funded schemes sponsored by AICTE, UGC and DSIR. In this context, a number of MoUs have been signed with research organizations of the country and abroad for facilitating collaborative research and other academic activities. Currently offered in four broad areas, technology, biotechnology, management and humanities, the college has instituted 48 doctoral fellowships. KIIT has also established a Centre for Innovation and Entrepreneurship to provide technical knowledge and facilities for starting technology driven enterprises as well as doing research for producing cost-effective techniques. In 2012, the Institution had organized the 99th Indian Science Congress.

== Student life ==
KIIT provides on-campus residential facilities to its students, research scholars, faculty members and many of its staff. The students live in hostels throughout their stay in the KIIT, though it's optional. There are 20 hostels for boys and 11 hostels for girls are available with accommodation capacity of 10,180 and 5,648 students respectively. About 30% of the hostel rooms are air-conditioned and all the hostels have attached canteens serving good quality food. Each hostel has a 24-hour reading room, a facility for indoor and outdoor games and wireless internet and intranet connectivity. There is a dedicated international hostel that accommodates foreign students.

There are different societies in KIIT to choose from according to the interest and choice of the student. Some of the major societies of the college are Qutopia, the Quiz society; Kronicle, the Literary Society, the Social Responsibility Cell and Korus, the Music Society. Students from Kronicle have made no marks at various National and International Level students. Social Responsibility Cell aims at inculcating a sense of social responsibility in the hearts and minds of all the students. The quiz society Qutopia organizes a national level quiz competition, Udghosh every year. The decenary edition of Udghosh was hosted by Vikram Joshi, winner of World Quizzing Championship. It also conducts an Intra-University Quiz competition "Launchpad" every year as a part of induction program. Qutopia is very well known in quizzing circles throughout the country and has produced quizzers who have not only conquered state and regional level quizzes, but also at national and international level, including the prestigious Tata Crucible Campus Quiz, which is hosted by ace quizmaster Giri Balasubramanium, along with other high-profile quizzes like Debasish Das Memorial (DDM) IT Quiz, Sweden India Nobel Memorial Quiz, and Mahindra AQ.

The KIIT chapter of Society for Promotion of Indian Classical Music And Culture Amongst Youth (SPICMACAY) established in 2003, promotes classical Indian music, dance, and culture among youth and have organised numerous musical concerts. Students can also join National Cadet Corps (NCC) and National Service Scheme (NSS). There are other cultural, literary societies and interest groups. Several schools have their own societies based on the course of the school. The School of Technology, have the Robotic Society, which organizes meetings and workshops to expose the students about robotic concept and how to build and program them. The School of Law have Student Bar Association, which organises moot court competitions and make the students ready for the same. National Cadet Corps (India)|The School of Management have forums based on marketing, HR, Finance and IT clubs which promotes and make the student aware on the latest happenings.

Apart from the societies, which organises Intra School competitions, the institute organizes different cultural and academic fest. The annual Techno-Management fest named KIIT FEST is organized every year which provides a platform for the progressive brains of our nation to interact, compete and display their creativity and talent. Koncord is the annual cultural fest organized in KIIT. Some of the schools organize their own fest, like the School of Management organizes its own fest Kolosseum every year. Other celebrations include Independence Day, Republic day are organized with great enthusiasm. KIIT International MUN is a Model United Nations Conference organised by the institute.

The KIIT Technology Business Incubator (KIIT-TBI) is an initiative of the Kalinga Institute of Industrial Technology (KIIT) supported by the Department of Science and Technology of the Government of India. It supports startup development by providing infrastructure and resources for early-stage businesses. Its portfolio includes startups in areas such as Web 2.0, biotechnology, agriculture, healthcare, and legal consulting. Autosports India, an automotive magazine and commercial website, was established by undergraduate mechanical engineering students at KIIT from the 2014 batch.

== Notable alumni ==
- Babushaan Mohanty (Tanmay Mohanty), Indian actor and playback singer
- Amiya Kumar Mallick, sprinter
- Archita Sahu, actor and model
- Debapratim Purkayastha, educator
- Dutee Chand, sprinter
