= Kalinga Institute of Social Sciences =

University in Odisha, India

- Other name: KISS University
- Motto: Eradicating hunger through Education
- Type: Deemed university
- Established: 1993; 33 years ago
- Founder: Achyuta Samanta
- Affiliations: UGC
- Chancellor: Satya S. Tripathi
- Vice-Chancellor: Debashis Bandyopadhyay
- Location: Bhubaneswar, Odisha, India; 20°12′46″N 85°28′59″E
- Campus: Urban
- Website: university.kiss.ac.in

Kalinga Institute of Social Sciences (KISS), informally KISS University, is a higher education institute deemed-to-be-university located in Bhubaneswar, Odisha, India. It was established in 1993 as a residential tribal school and became a deemed-to-be-university in 2017.

== History ==
KISS was founded in 1993 by Achyuta Samanta as a residential tribal school. In 2017 the institute was awarded the university status.

Satya S. Tripathi was appointed chancellor in 2021 and Sasmita Samanta is now appointed Vice Chancellor of the university.

In April 2023, speaking at a press conference at Kolkata, Achyuta Samanta said that, In the next three years, we are planning to expand. We will hold talks with the Bengal government soon and we hope that we will get land for setting up a campus here. We will start with school-level and gradually expand to Post-Graduation.

== Academic ==
The university offers bachelors, masters and doctorate degrees.

=== Bachelor degree ===
Admission into bachelor's degree are channelized into Arts, Science and Commerce streams (all Hons.) and all streams are focus on the tribal studies ( Culture, Philosophy, Heritage, Science & Technology, Linguistics & Literature, Resource Management, Legal Studies & Rights) aspects.

=== Master degree ===
There are 7 master's degree departments.

- Department of Tribal Culture, Philosophy & Eco-Spiritualism
- Department of Tribal Heritage & Tribal Indology
- Department of Comparative Tribal Linguistics & Literature
- Department of Tribal Legal Studies & Tribal Rights
- Department of Indigenous Knowledge Science & Technology
- Department of Comparative Indic Studies & Tribal Science
- Department of Tribal Resource Management

=== Ph.D. / M.Phil. ===
- Tribal Culture, Philosophy and Eco-Spiritualism
- Tribal Heritage and Tribal Indology
- Comparative Tribal Linguistics and Literature
- Tribal Legal Studies and Tribal Rights
- Indigenous Knowledge Science and Technology
- Comparative Indic Studies and Tribal Science
- Tribal Resource Management
