= Kalinga Stadium =

Multi-purpose stadium in Bhubaneswar, Odisha

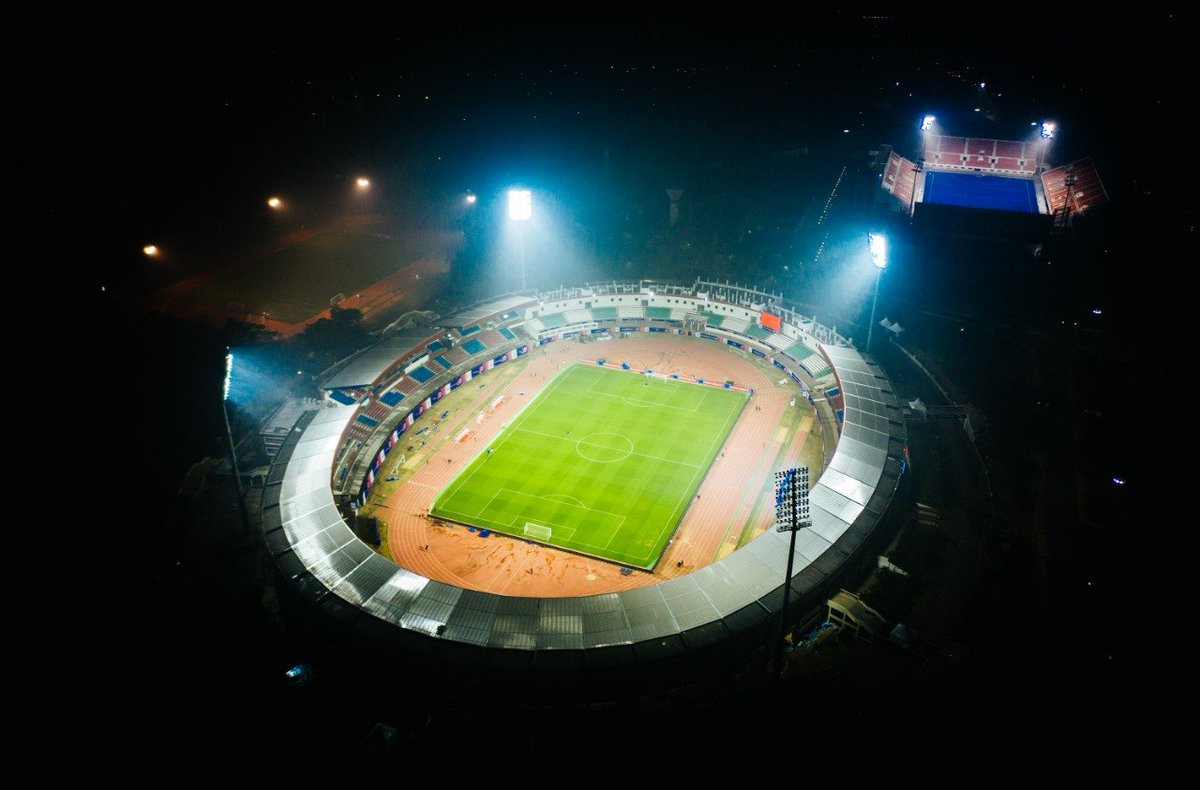
- Interactive map of Kalinga Stadium
- Location: Bidyut Marg, Bhubaneswar, Odisha, India
- Coordinates: 20.288062739324612°N 85.82381948305955°E
- Owner: Government of Odisha
- Operator: Sports and Youth Services (DSYS)
- Capacity: Kalinga Stadium: 15,000; Kalinga Hockey Stadium: 16,000
- Surface: Natural grass
- Record attendance: 15,000 (2017 Asian Athletics Championships)
- Field size: 109 m × 72 m (358 ft × 236 ft)

Construction
- Built: 1978
- Opened: 1978

Tenants
- India men's national field hockey team India women's national field hockey team India national football team India women's national football team Odisha hockey teams Odisha football team Odisha women's football team Indian Arrows (2018–2022); Odisha FC (2019–present); Sports Odisha

The Kalinga Stadium is a multi-purpose international sports complex in Bhubaneswar, Odisha, India. Its foundation stone was laid by Biju Patnaik in 1978. It is best known as the home ground of the Indian Super League club Odisha FC since its inception in 2019. It was the home ground of the I-League club Indian Arrows from 2018 until 2022. It is situated in the heart of Bhubaneswar near Nayapalli area. It has facilities for athletics, football, field hockey, tennis, table tennis, basketball, volleyball, wall climbing and swimming. Other features of the stadium include an 8-lane synthetic athletics track, high performance centres, and India's first Olympic standard pink and blue water-based AstroTurf.

== History ==
The Government of Odisha gained widespread reputation for the successful execution of the "90-Day Challenge" for hosting the 2017 Asian Athletics Championships when the former venue Ranchi backed out of hosting the event 3 months prior. The city of Bhubaneswar has been termed as the 'Sports Capital of India' for hosting a large number as well as a wide variety of sporting events and nurturing future talents. As per a 2021 survey, Bhubaneswar was ranked 3rd among top 5 cities of India in terms of sports ecosystem and ability to host mega sporting events.

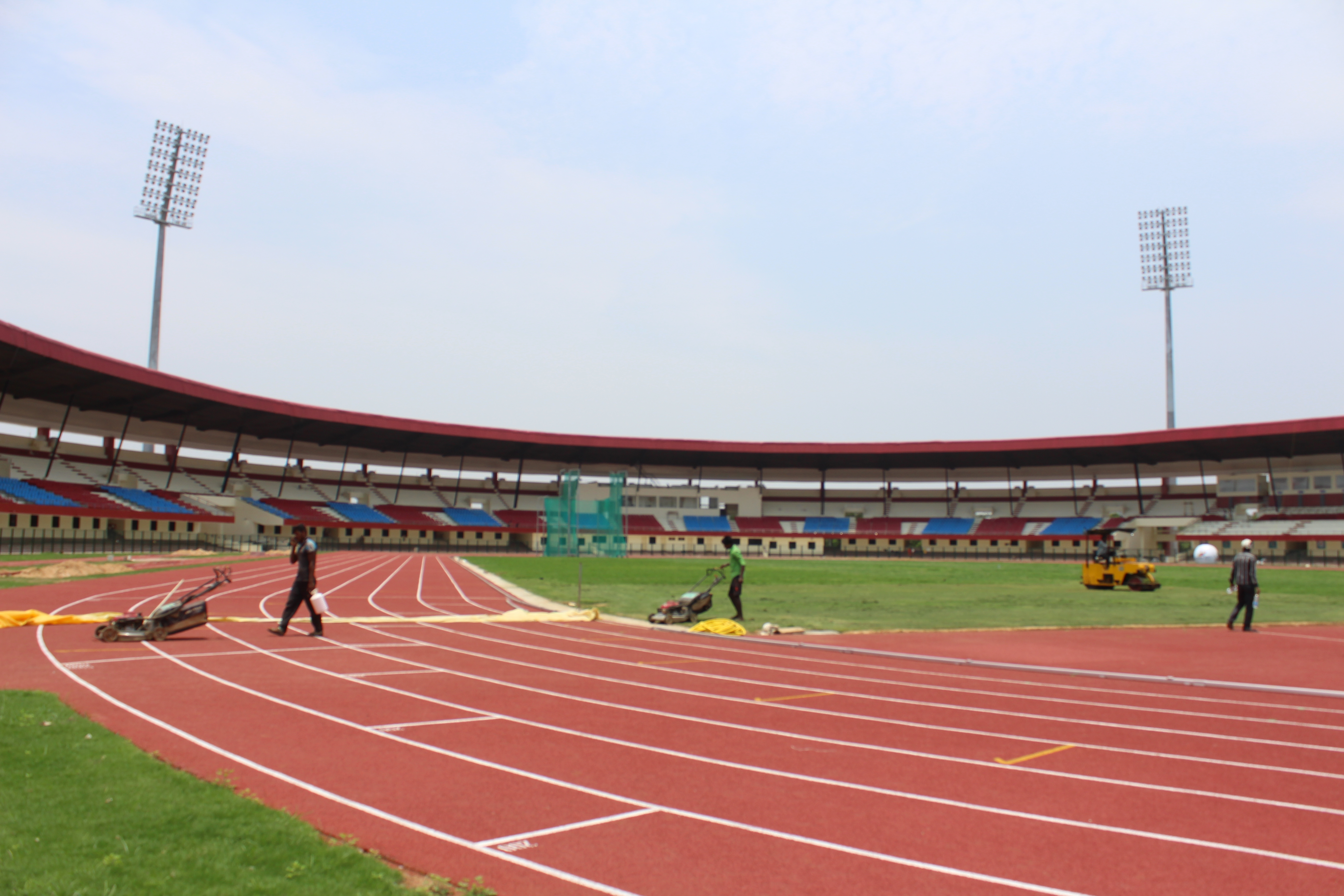
Interior of the stadium with running track

The stadium had been chosen as a venue for the 2020 FIFA U-17 Women's World Cup which was later postponed to 2021 but was cancelled due to COVID-19 pandemic and later shifted to 2022 FIFA U-17 Women's World Cup. It was initially chosen as a venue for the 2022 AFC Women's Asia Cup in 2021 but was later dropped off.

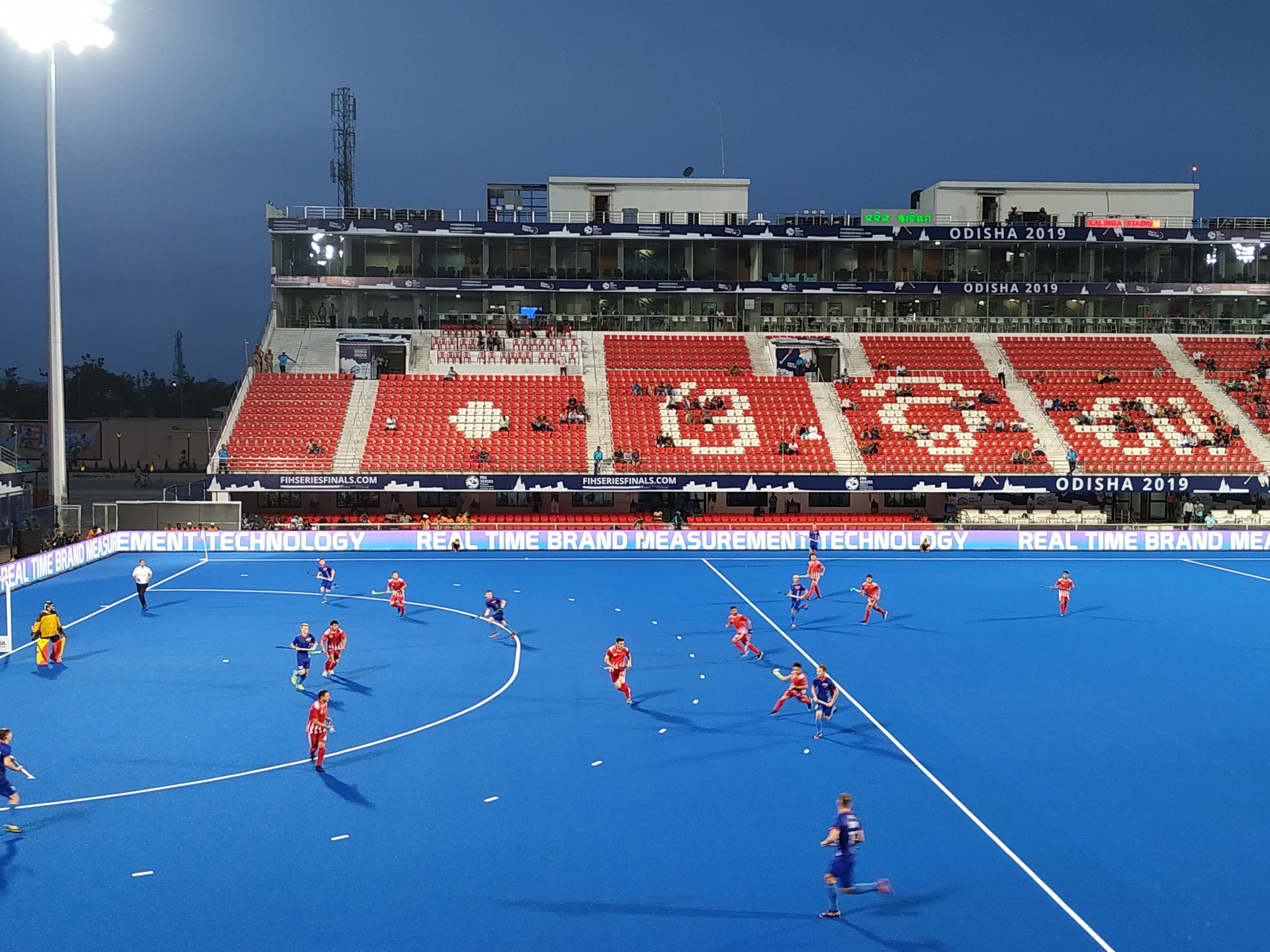
Field hockey match at the Kalinga Hockey Stadium

== Events ==
=== International ===
==== Athletics ====
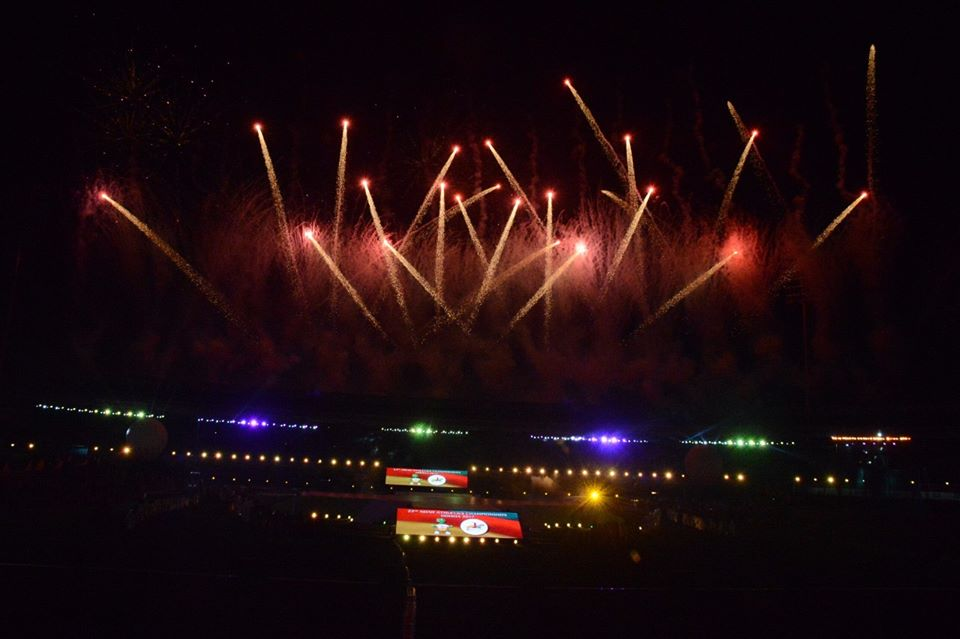
Fireworks on display at the Opening Ceremony of the 2017 Asian Athletics Championships.

| Event | Year | Organiser | Dates |
|---|---|---|---|
| Asian Athletics Championships | 2017 | Athletics Federation of India | 5–9 July 2017 |
| World Athletics Continental Tour Bronze | 2025 | Athletics Federation of India | 10 August 2025 |

==== Football ====
| Event | Year | Organiser | Dates |
|---|---|---|---|
| Gold Cup | 2019 | All India Football Federation | 9–15 February 2019 |
| SAFF U-20 Championship | 2022 | South Asian Football Federation | 25 July – 5 August 2022 |
| FIFA U-17 Women's World Cup | 2022 | FIFA | 11–30 October 2022 |
| Intercontinental Cup | 2023 | All India Football Federation | 9–18 June 2023 |
| AFC Cup | 2023 | Asian Football Confederation | 19 September 2023 |
| 2027 AFC Asian Cup qualifiers/ 2026 FIFA World Cup qualifiers (AFC) | 2023 | Asian Football Confederation | 21 November 2023 |

==== Hockey ====
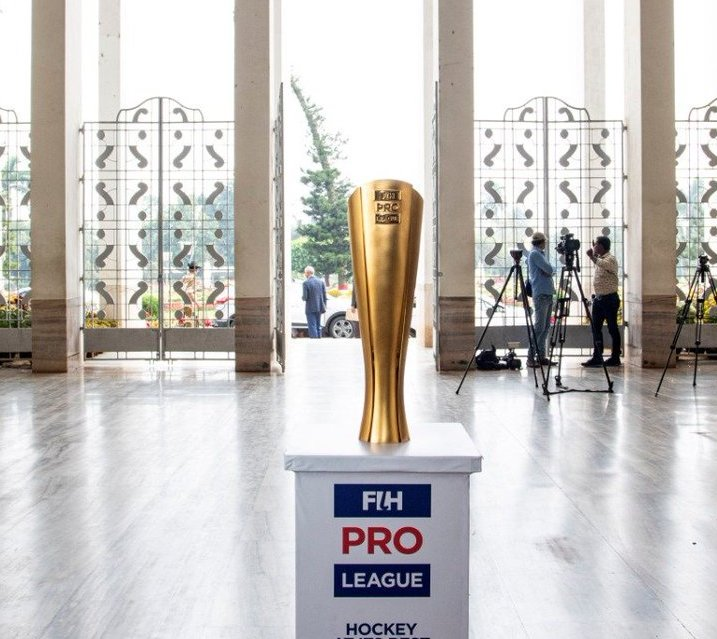
2020 Men's FIH Pro League trophy in Bhubaneswar ahead of the second phase of Team India's Pro League fixtures at the Kalinga Stadium.

| Event | Year | Organiser | Dates |
|---|---|---|---|
| Hockey Champions Trophy | 2014 | Hockey India | 6–14 December 2014 |
| Men's FIH Hockey World League | 2016–17 | Hockey India | 1–10 December 2017 |
| Men's FIH Hockey World Cup | 2018 | Hockey India | 28 November – 16 December 2018 |
| FIH Hockey Series Finals | 2018–19 | Hockey India | 6–16 June 2019 |
| 2019 Women's FIH Olympic Qualifiers | 2019 | Hockey India | 1–2 November 2019 |
| 2019 Men's FIH Olympic Qualifiers | 2019 | Hockey India | 1–2 November 2019 |
| Men's FIH Pro League | 2020–21 | Hockey India | 18 January – 30 May 2021 |
| Men's FIH Hockey Junior World Cup | 2021 | Hockey India | 24 November – 5 December 2021 |
| Men's FIH Pro League | 2021-22 | Hockey India | 26 February – 15 April 2022 |
| Women's FIH Pro League | 2021-22 | Hockey India | 26 February – 9 April 2022 |
| Men's FIH Pro League | 2022-23 | Hockey India | 28 October – 6 November 2022 |
| Men's FIH Hockey World Cup | 2023 | Hockey India | 13–29 January 2023 |
| 2023–24 Women's FIH Pro League | 2024 | Hockey India | 3–16 February 2024 |
| 2023–24 Men's FIH Pro League | 2024 | Hockey India | 3–16 February 2024 |
| 2024–25 Women's FIH Pro League | 2025 | Hockey India | 15–25 February 2025 |
| 2024–25 Men's FIH Pro League | 2025 | Hockey India | 15–25 February 2025 |

==== Table Tennis ====
| Event | Year | Organiser | Dates |
|---|---|---|---|
| Asian Table Tennis Championships | 2025 | Asian Table Tennis Union | 11–15 October 2025 |

==== Tennis ====
| Event | Year | Organiser | Dates |
|---|---|---|---|
| India F1 Futures | 2018 | All India Tennis Association | 26 February – 4 March 2018 |

==== Rugby ====
| Event | Year | Organiser | Dates |
|---|---|---|---|
| Asia Rugby U18 Girl's Sevens | 2018 | Asia Rugby; Rugby India | 26–28 October 2018 |

=== National ===
==== Multi-sport events ====
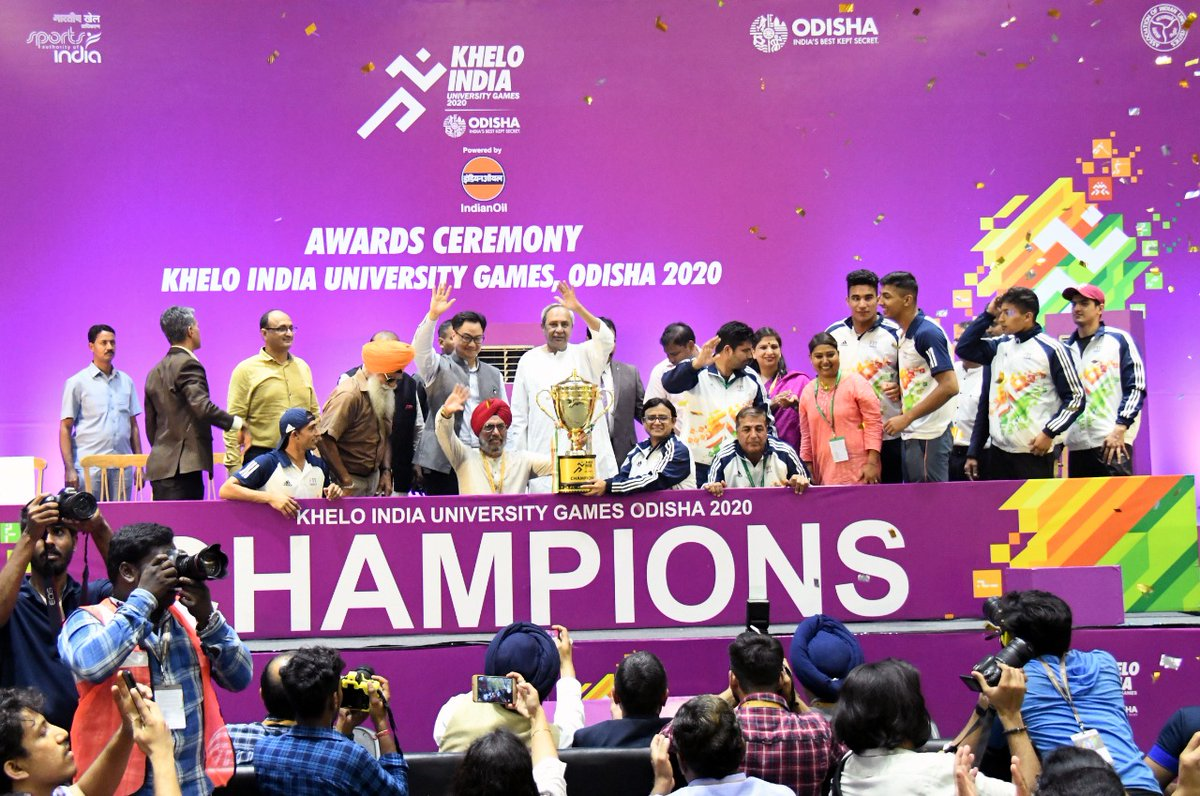
Panjab University, Chandigarh were crowned champions of the inaugural edition of Khelo India University Games in 2020.

| Event | Year | Organiser | Dates |
|---|---|---|---|
| Khelo India University Games | 2020 | Sports Authority of India; Ministry of Youth Affairs and Sports | 22 February – 1 March 2020 |

==== Athletics ====
| Event | Year | Organiser | Dates |
|---|---|---|---|
| National Open Athletics Championships | 2018 | Athletics Federation of India | 25–28 September 2018 |
| Indian Grand Prix 3 | 2022 | Athletics Federation of India | 21 May 2022 |
| Indian Grand Prix 4 | 2022 | Athletics Federation of India | 24 May 2022 |
| National Para Athletics Championship | 2022 | Athletics Federation of India | 28–31 March 2022 |

==== Football ====
| Event | Year |
|---|---|
| Super Cup | 2018; 2019; 2024; 2025 |

=== Leagues ===
==== Football ====
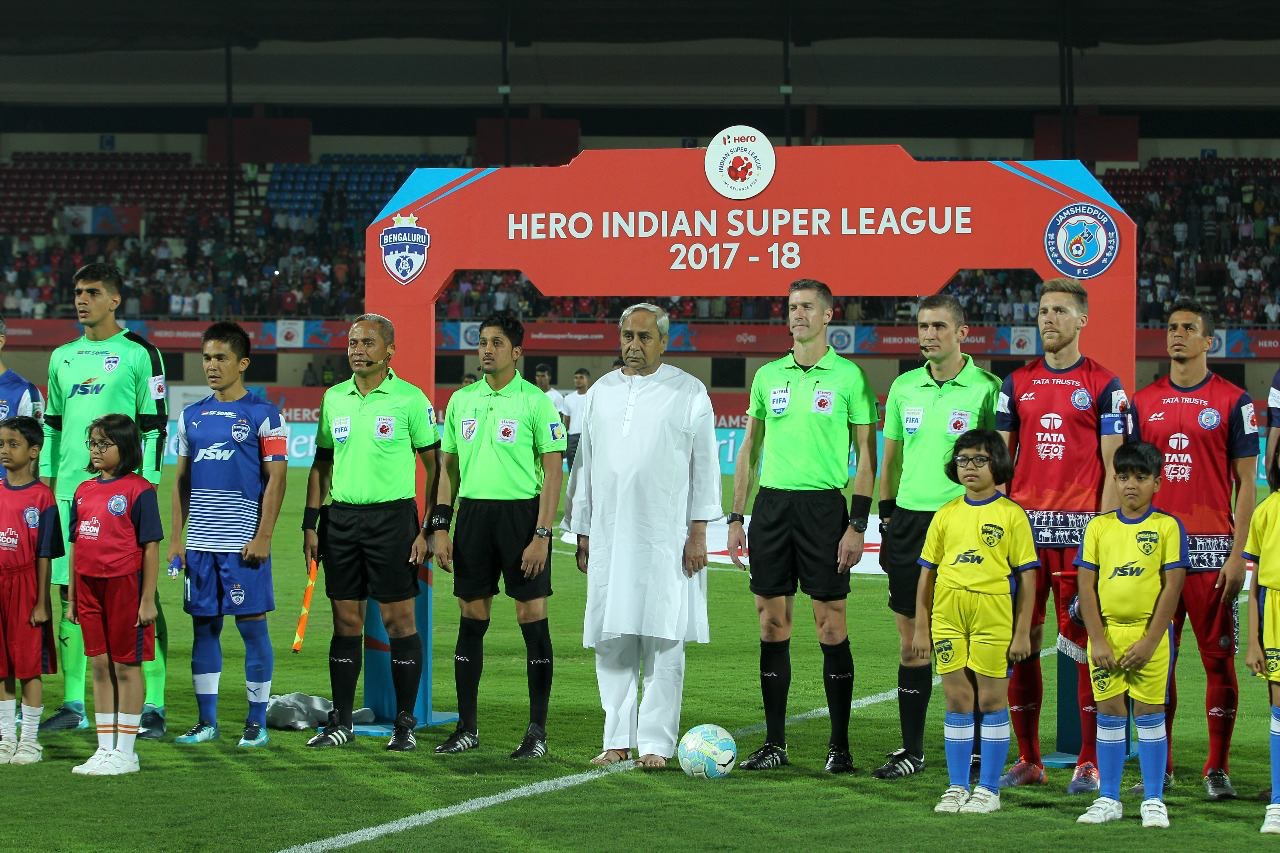
ISL Jamshedpur FC vs Bengaluru FC match at Kalinga Stadium

| Event | Year |
|---|---|
| I-League | 2018–19 |
| Indian Super League | 2019–20; 2020–21; 2021–22; 2022–23; 2023–24; 2024–25 |
| Indian Women's League | 2021–22; 2023–24; 2024–25 |

==== Hockey ====
| Event | Year | Organiser |
|---|---|---|
| Hockey India League | 2014; 2015; 2016; 2017; 2025-26 | Hockey India |

==== Tennis ====
| Event | Year | Organiser |
|---|---|---|
| Odisha Tennis Premier League | 2017; 2018; 2019 | Odisha Tennis Association |

== High Performance Centers ==
- Abhinav Bindra Targeting Performance (ABTP)
- Shuttle by Dalmia Bharat
- JSW Swimming HPC
- Khelo India State Centre of Excellence (KISCE) for Athletics, Hockey, and Weightlifting
- KJS Ahluwalia and Tenvic Sports HPC for Weightlifting
- Odisha Naval Tata Hockey High Performance Centre (ONTHHPC)
- Odisha Aditya Birla and Gagan Narang Shooting HPC
- Reliance Foundation Odisha Athletics HPC
- SAI Regional Badminton Academy
- Udaan Badminton Academy
- AIFF High Performance Centre
- AIFF-FIFA High Performance Centre
- AM/NS Gymnastics High Performance Centre
- AM/NS Kho Kho High Performance Centre
- Tata Steel Archery & Sports Climbing HPC

== Other tenants ==
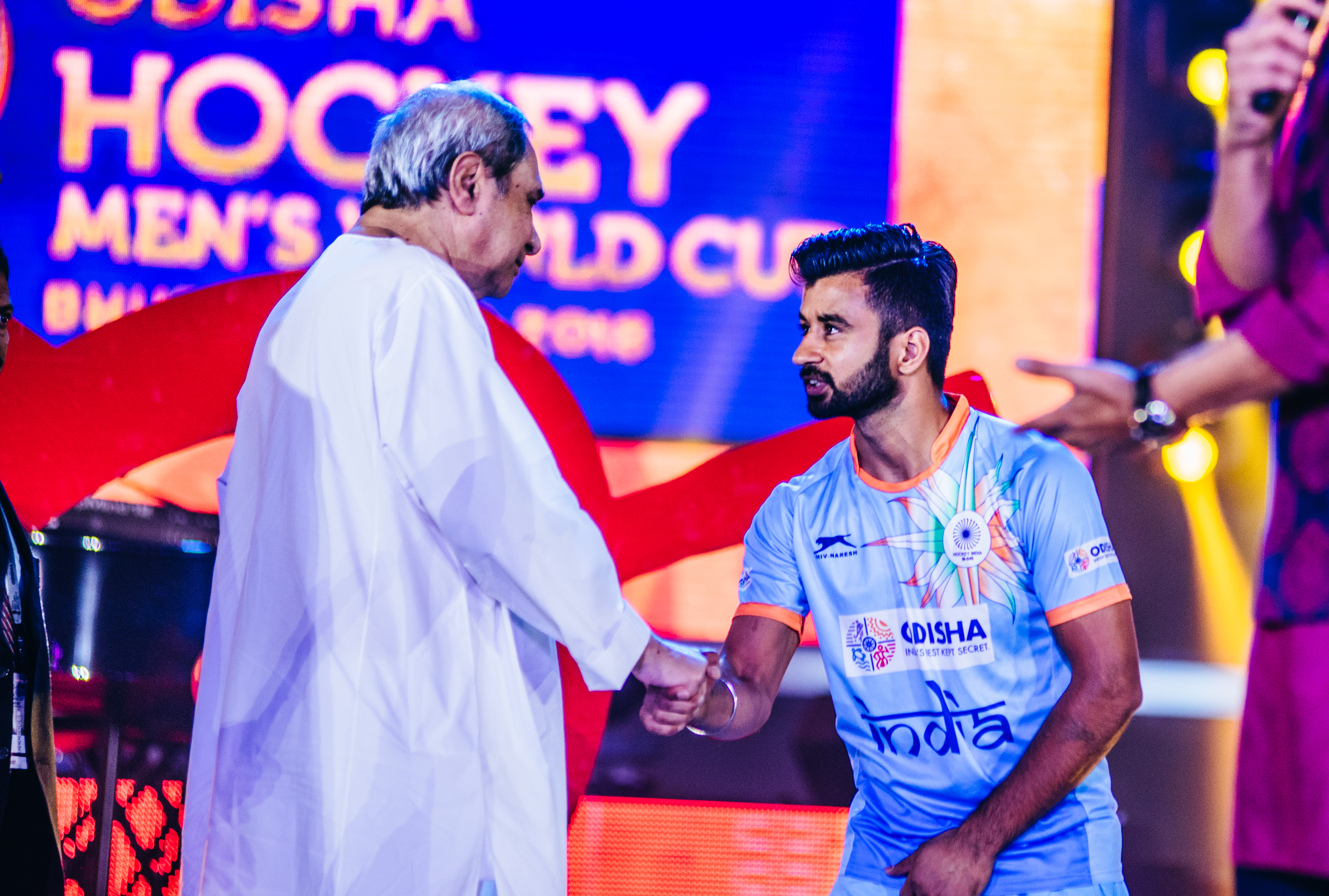
Odisha's Chief Minister Naveen Patnaik with Indian Captain Manpreet Singh at the Opening Ceremony of the 2018 Men's Hockey World Cup.

=== Hockey ===
| Team | Tournament | League |
|---|---|---|
| Kalinga Lancers | Field hockey | Hockey India League |

=== Tennis ===
| Team | Sport | Tournament |
|---|---|---|
| Ace Tennis Club (ATC) | Tennis | Utkal Open Tennis Tournament |
