= 2019–20 World Rugby Sevens Series squads =

International rugby sevens

Sevens 2019–20 squads

This is a list of the complete squads for the 2019–20 World Rugby Sevens Series.

Legend
Gold	Indicates the captains for a tournament
–	Indicates that a player did not play in the tournament

== Argentina ==
Head Coach: (Argentina) Santiago Gómez Cora

Argentina team members 2019–20
Player	Jersey number by tournament					
Player	Dubai	Cape Town	Hamilton	Sydney	Los Angeles	Vancouver
Santiago Álvarez	6	6	6	6	6	6
Felipe del Mestre	13	13	2	13	–	–
Rodrigo Etchart	5	5	5	5	5	5
Luciano González	11	11	11	11	11	–
Fernando Luna	1	1	13	1	–	–
Santiago Mare	10	10	10	10	10	10
Marcos Moroni	2	2	4	4	4	4
Matías Osadczuk	9	9	9	9	9	9
Gastón Revol	8	8	8	8	8	8
Franco Sabato	12	12	12	–	–	–
Germán Schulz	3	3	3	3	3	3
Francisco Ulloa	4	4	–	2	–	–
Lautaro Bazan Velez	7	–	–	–	7	7
Geronimo Prisciantelli	–	7	–	–	–	–
Rodrigo Isgró	–	–	1	12	1	13
Tomas Vanni	–	–	7	7	13	11
Lucio Cinti	–	–	–	–	2	2
Marcos Moneta	–	–	–	–	12	12
Joaquín De La Vega	–	–	–	–	–	1

== Australia ==
Head Coach: (Australia) Tim Walsh

Australia team members 2019–20
Player	Jersey number by tournament					
Player	Dubai	Cape Town	Hamilton	Sydney	Los Angeles	Vancouver
Lachie Anderson	12	–	12	12	12	12
Josh Coward	9	9	–	–	–	–
Matt Hood	13	13	–	–	–	–
Henry Hutchison	1	1	1	1	1	1
Simon Kennewell	2	2	–	–	–	–
Maurice Longbottom	11	–	11	11	11	11
Nick Malouf	10	–	10	10	10	10
Lachie Miller	5	5	13	5	5	5
Jesse Parahi	8	8	8	8	–	–
Joe Pincus	6	6	6	6	6	6
Jeral Skelton	3	3	3	3	–	–
Josh Turner	7	7	7	7	13	7
Trae Williams	4	11	–	9	9	9
Rodney Davies	–	12	9	–	3	13
Lewis Holland	–	4	4	4	4	4
Sean McMahon	–	10	–	–	–	–
Ben O'Donnell	–	–	5	–	–	–
Dylan Pietsch	–	–	2	2	2	2
Luke Morahan	–	–	–	13	–	–
Angus Bell	–	–	–	–	7	–
Stuart Dunbar	–	–	–	–	8	8
Tim Anstee	–	–	–	–	–	3

== Canada ==
Head Coach: (New Zealand) Henry Paul

Canada team members 2019–20
Player	Jersey number by tournament					
Player	Dubai	Cape Town	Hamilton	Sydney	Los Angeles	Vancouver
Phil Berna	4	4	4	4	4	4
Connor Braid	6	6	6	6	6	6
Cooper Coats	8	8	–	–	–	–
Mike Fuailefau	3	3	3	3	3	3
Nathan Hirayama	9	9	9	9	9	9
Harry Jones	11	11	11	11	11	11
Isaac Kaay	2	2	2	2	2	2
Pat Kay	10	10	10	10	10	10
Josiah Morra	5	13	13	13	–	–
Matthew Mullins	1	1	–	–	–	–
David Richard	7	7	8	8	12	–
Theo Saudder	13	5	1	1	1	1
Jake Thiel	12	12	12	12	13	13
Andrew Coe	–	–	5	5	–	12
Lucas Hammond	–	–	7	7	7	7
Justin Douglas	–	–	–	–	8	8
Conor Trainor	–	–	–	–	5	5

== England ==
Head Coach: (England) Simon Amor (until Cape Town), (England) James Rodwell (from Hamilton)

England team members 2019–20
Player	Jersey number by tournament					
Player	Dubai	Cape Town	Hamilton	Sydney	Los Angeles	Vancouver
Dan Bibby	7	7	7	7	7	–
Tom Bowen	8	8	8	8	8	8
Phil Burgess	3	3	3	3	3	3
Richard de Carpentier	13	1	–	–	–	–
Mike Ellery	2	2	2	2	2	2
Tom Emery	6	6	–	–	11	11
Harry Glover	12	12	–	–	–	–
Ben Harris	1	11	1	12	12	12
Charlton Kerr	5	5	5	5	5	5
Ollie Lindsay-Hague	9	9	9	9	–	–
Will Muir	10	13	–	–	–	–
Dan Norton	4	4	4	4	4	–
Ethan Waddleton	11	–	11	11	–	–
Will Edwards	–	10	10	10	9	9
Will Hendy	–	–	13	1	1	1
Alfie Johnson	–	–	12	13	13	7
Tom Mitchell	–	–	6	6	6	6
Alex Davis	–	–	–	–	10	10
Will Glover	–	–	–	—	–	4
Noah Sixton	–	–	–	–	–	13

== Fiji ==
Head Coach: (England) Gareth Baber

Fiji team members 2019–20
Player	Jersey number by tournament					
Player	Dubai	Cape Town	Hamilton	Sydney	Los Angeles	Vancouver
Napolioni Bolaca	13	12	10	12	12	12
Vilimoni Botitu	7	7	7	7	7	7
Meli Derenalagi	6	6	6	6	6	6
Paula Dranisinukula	4	4	–	–	–	–
Sevuloni Mocenacagi	1	1	1	1	1	1
Waisea Nacuqu	8	8	8	8	8	8
Alasio Naduva	10	10	13	10	10	10
Isoa Tabu	3	3	–	–	–	–
Kavekini Tabu	5	5	3	3	3	3
Terio Tamani	12	–	–	–	–	13
Aminiasi Tuimaba	11	11	11	11	11	–
Jerry Tuwai	9	9	9	9	9	9
Josua Vakurunabili	2	2	2	2	2	2
Apenisa Cakaubalavu	–	13	5	13	5	5
Livai Ikanikoda	–	–	12	5	5	–
Asaeli Ratuvuaka	–	–	4	4	4	–
Suli Volivolituevei	–	–	–	–	13	4
Asaeli Tuivuaka	–	–	–	–	–	11

== France ==
Head Coach: (France) Jérôme Daret

France team members 2019–20
Player	Jersey number by tournament					
Player	Dubai	Cape Town	Hamilton	Sydney	Los Angeles	Vancouver
Jean-Pascal Barraque	10	10	10	10	10	–
Terry Bouchraoua	4	–	4	4	4	4
Manoel Dall'igna	2	–	–	–	–	–
William Iraguha	13	2	–	12	13	11
Pierre Gilles Lakafia	8	8	8	8	–	–
Jonathan Laugel	1	1	1	13	1	1
Thibaud Mazzoleni	5	5	12	–	–	–
Marvin O'Connor	9	9	2	2	2	2
Pierre Mignot	12	12	9	9	–	10
Paulin Riva	6	6	6	6	6	6
Remi Siega	7	7	7	7	7	7
Sacha Valleau	11	11	11	11	11	–
Tavite Veredamu	3	3	3	3	3	3
Stephen Parez	–	4	5	5	5	5
Antoine Zeghdar	–	13	13	1	–	–
Mathias Colombet	–	–	–	–	9	9
Ethan Dumortier	–	–	–	–	8	8
Jean-Teiva Jacquelain	–	–	–	–	12	12
Jordan Sepho	–	–	–	–	–	13

== Ireland ==
Head Coach: (Australia) Anthony Eddy

Ireland team members 2019–20
Player	Jersey number by tournament					
Player	Dubai	Cape Town	Hamilton	Sydney	Los Angeles	Vancouver
Jordan Conroy	7	7	7	7	7	7
Billy Dardis	6	6	6	6	6	6
Foster Horan	4	–	4	–	–	4
Jack Kelly	1	1	1	1	1	1
Terry Kennedy	10	10	10	10	10	10
Adam Leavy	2	2	2	2	2	2
Hugo Lennox	11	11	11	11	11	11
Peter Maher	12	12	–	–	–	–
Harry McNulty	3	3	3	3	3	3
John O'Donnell	13	4	5	5	–	–
Greg O'Shea	8	8	8	8	8	8
Aaron O'Sullivan	5	5	–	9	5	–
Mark Roche	9	9	9	13	9	9
Liam Turner	–	13	13	4	4	5
Bryan Mollen	–	–	12	12	12	13
Graham Curtis	–	–	–	–	13	12

== Kenya ==
Head Coach: (New Zealand) Paul Feeney

Kenya team members 2019–20
Player	Jersey number by tournament					
Player	Dubai	Cape Town	Hamilton	Sydney	Los Angeles	Vancouver
Willy Ambaka	12	12	12	12	12	13
Andrew Amonde	8	8	8	8	8	8
Oscar Dennis	7	–	–	–	9	9
Bush Mwale	2	7	2	2	–	–
Billy Odhiambo	5	5	5	5	5	5
Jacob Ojee	11	11	–	–	7	7
Johnstone Olindi	10	10	10	10	–	–
Jeff Oluoch	6	6	6	6	13	6
Vincent Onyala	4	4	4	13	4	4
Alvin Otieno	3	3	3	3	3	3
Nelson Oyoo	9	9	9	9	–	–
Daniel Sikuta	13	2	–	–	6	12
Daniel Taabu	1	1	1	1	1	1
Herman Humwa	–	13	13	4	–	–
Collins Injera	–	–	11	11	11	11
Geofrey Okwach	–	–	7	7	–	–
Oscar Achieng	–	–	–	–	2	–
Samuel Oliech	–	–	–	–	10	10
Oscar Ouma	–	–	–	–	–	2

== New Zealand ==
Head Coach: (Scotland) Clark Laidlaw

New Zealand team members 2019–20
Player	Jersey number by tournament					
Player	Dubai	Cape Town	Hamilton	Sydney	Los Angeles	Vancouver
Kurt Baker	10	10	10	10	–	–
Dylan Collier	5	5	5	5	–	–
Sam Dickson	7	7	7	7	7	7
Scott Curry	1	1	1	1	–	–
Andrew Knewstubb	8	8	–	–	8	8
Ngarohi McGarvey-Black	6	6	8	8	10	13
Tim Mikkelson	2	2	2	2	2	2
Sione Molia	12	–	12	12	12	12
Tone Ng Shiu	3	3	3	13	3	3
Salesi Rayasi	4	4	13	3	–	–
Akuila Rokolisoa	13	12	–	–	6	10
Regan Ware	9	9	9	9	–	–
Joe Webber	11	11	11	–	–	–
William Warbrick	–	13	–	–	5	5
Vilimoni Koroi	–	–	6	6	13	6
Etene Nanai-Seturo	–	–	4	4	11	11
Caleb Clarke	–	–	–	11	9	9
Amanaki Nicole	–	–	–	–	1	1
Joe Ravouvou	–	–	–	–	4	4

== Samoa ==
Head Coach: (New Zealand) Gordon Tietjens

Samoa team members 2019–20
Player	Jersey number by tournament					
Player	Dubai	Cape Town	Hamilton	Sydney	Los Angeles	Vancouver
Elisapeta Alofipo	10	10	10	10	10	10
Tomasi Alosio	8	8	8	8	8	8
Losi Filipo	12	12	3	3	3	3
Phillip Luki	7	7	–	2	2	2
Kelvin Masoe	13	13	–	–	–	–
Alamanda Motuga	2	2	2	–	–	–
Joe Perez	11	11	11	11	11	11
Kirisimasi Savaiinaea	3	3	–	–	–	–
Paulo Scanlan	6	6	6	13	5	5
Tofatu Solia	1	1	1	1	1	1
Belgium Tuatagaloa	4	4	–	–	–	–
Tuna Tuitama	9	9	13	6	–	–
John Vaili	5	5	5	5	13	–
David Afamasaga	–	–	12	12	12	12
Laaloi Leilua	–	–	4	4	4	13
Va'a Apelu Maliko	–	–	9	9	9	9
Uaina Sione	–	–	7	7	7	7
Melani Matavao	–	–	–	–	6	6
Malachi Unasa-Knox	–	–	–	–	–	4

== Scotland ==
Head Coach: (Scotland) Ciaran Beattie

Scotland team members 2019–20
Player	Jersey number by tournament					
Player	Dubai	Cape Town	Hamilton	Sydney	Los Angeles	Vancouver
Scott Bickerstaff	1	1	–	–	–	13
Tom Brown	6	6	6	6	13	12
Alec Coombes	3	3	3	3	3	3
Harvey Elms	5	5	5	5	5	5
Ross McCann	12	12	12	12	12	–
Max McFarland	11	11	11	11	11	11
Robbie Fergusson	4	4	4	4	4	4
Dougie Fife	7	7	7	7	–	8
Gavin Lowe	10	10	10	10	10	10
Sam Pecqueur	9	9	9	9	9	–
Kyle Rowe	2	–	–	–	6	6
Femi Sofolarin	8	8	8	–	–	–
Callum Young	13	–	–	–	–	9
Nyle Godsmark	–	13	13	8	8	–
Ally Miller	–	2	2	2	2	2
Paddy Kelly	–	–	1	1	1	1
Jamie Farndale	–	–	–	–	7	7

== South Africa ==
Head Coach: (South Africa) Neil Powell

South Africa team members 2019–20
Player	Jersey number by tournament					
Player	Dubai	Cape Town	Hamilton	Sydney	Los Angeles	Vancouver
Kurt-Lee Arendse	10	10	–	–	9	9
Selvyn Davids	7	7	8	8	8	8
Zain Davids	4	4	4	4	–	–
Chris Dry	1	1	1	1	3	3
Justin Geduld	9	9	9	9	–	–
Christie Grobbelaar	13	–	–	–	–	–
Ruhan Nel	12	12	–	–	–	–
Ryan Oosthuizen	2	2	–	–	2	2
JC Pretorius	5	5	6	6	6	13
Dylan Sage	3	3	–	–	–	–
Seabelo Senatla	11	11	–	–	–	–
Siviwe Soyizwapi	6	6	–	–	–	–
Rosko Specman	8	8	–	–	–	–
Impi Visser	–	13	3	3	–	–
Cecil Afrika	–	–	10	10	10	10
Angelo Davids	–	–	2	2	1	1
Muller du Plessis	–	–	11	11	11	11
Branco du Preez	–	–	7	7	7	7
Stedman Gans	–	–	12	12	12	12
Werner Kok	–	–	5	5	5	5
Sakoyisa Makata	–	–	13	13	4	4
Mfundo Ndhlovu	–	–	–	–	13	6

== Spain ==
Head Coach: (Spain) Pablo Feijoo

Spain team members 2019–20
Player	Jersey number by tournament					
Player	Dubai	Cape Town	Hamilton	Sydney	Los Angeles	Vancouver
Javier Carrion	10	10	–	10	10	–
Javier De Juan	3	–	3	3	3	3
Pablo Fontes	4	4	4	4	4	4
Francisco Hernández	6	6	6	6	6	6
Eduardo Lopez	12	12	11	13	–	10
Joan Losada	9	9	9	9	9	–
Juan Martinez	13	3	–	–	–	–
Iñaki Mateu	2	3	2	2	2	2
Diego Periel	11	11	–	–	–	–
Pol Pla	7	–	7	7	7	7
Juan Ramos	8	8	8	8	8	8
Ignacio Rodríguez-Guerra	1	1	1	1	1	1
Manuel Sainz-Trapaga	5	5	5	5	5	5
Andres Arnau	–	7	–	–	–	–
Alejandro de la Rosa	–	–	12	12	–	13
Tobias Sainz-Trapaga	–	–	10	11	13	9
Alejandro Alonso	–	–	–	–	12	12
Martin Alonso	–	–	–	–	11	11

== United States ==
Head Coach: (England) Mike Friday

United States team members 2019–20
Player	Jersey number by tournament					
Player	Dubai	Cape Town	Hamilton	Sydney	Los Angeles	Vancouver
Perry Baker	11	11	11	11	11	11
Danny Barrett	3	3	3	3	3	3
Ben Broselle	2	2	5	–	–	13
Maceo Brown	12	12	–	–	13	4
Naima Fuala'au	7	7	7	7	7	7
Madison Hughes	10	10	10	13	10	10
Carlin Isles	1	1	1	1	1	1
Matai Leuta	4	4	4	4	–	–
Joe Schroeder	5	5	–	–	4	–
Stephen Tomasin	9	9	9	9	9	9
Maka Unufe	8	8	8	8	8	8
Kevon Williams	6	6	6	6	6	6
Harley Wheeler	13	13	–	–	–	–
Martin Iosefo	–	–	12	12	12	12
Ben Pinkelman	–	–	2	2	2	–
Marcus Tupuola	–	–	13	5	–	–
Cody Melphy	–	–	–	10	5	5
Malon Al-Jiboori	–	–	–	–	–	2

== Wales ==
Head Coach: (Wales) Darren Edwards

Wales team members 2019–20
Player	Jersey number by tournament					
Player	Dubai	Cape Town	Hamilton	Sydney	Los Angeles	Vancouver
Ben Cambriani	3	3	–	–	–	–
Rhys Davies	13	13	–	–	–	–
Cai Devine	8	8	8	8	–	–
Rio Dyer	5	5	–	–	–	–
George Gasson	11	11	11	–	–	–
Joe Goodchild	4	–	4	4	–	–
Jay Jones	6	6	6	6	6	6
Cameron Lewis	2	2	2	2	–	–
Tomi Lewis	9	9	–	–	–	–
Ben Roach	12	12	12	12	12	–
Morgan Sieniawski	10	10	10	10	–	–
Daf Smith	7	7	7	7	7	7
Luke Treharne	1	1	1	1	1	1
Brandon Wood	–	4	5	13	–	–
James Benjamin	–	–	3	3	3	3
James McCarthy	–	–	13	11	–	–
Will Thomas	–	–	9	9	9	9
Will Jones	–	–	–	5	5	5
Callum Carson	–	–	–	–	11	11
Ethan Davies	–	–	–	–	13	10
Alex Grey	–	–	–	–	10	8
Callun James	–	–	–	–	8	13
Lloyd Lewis	–	–	–	–	4	4
Caine Woolerton	–	–	–	–	2	2
Tom Williams	–	–	–	–	–	12

== Non-core teams ==
One place in each tournament of the series is allocated to a national team based on performance in the respective continental tournaments within Africa, Asia, Europe, Oceania, and the Americas. Dispite not being a core team, Japan got invited to 5 of the 6 tournaments as the wild card team in preparation to host the Olympic tournament.

== Japan ==
Head Coach: (Japan) Kensuke Iwabuchi

Japan team members 2019–20
Player	Jersey number by tournament				
Player	Dubai	Cape Town	Hamilton	Sydney	Vancouver
Yoshikazu Fujita	10	10	10	–	–
Teruya Goto	7	–	7	–	–
Taisei Hayashi	11	11	–	11	8
Masakatsu Hikosaka	3	–	3	–	–
Kippei Ishida	6	–	11	–	9
Kohei Ishigaki	4	4	–	–	–
Yusaku Kuwazuru	2	–	13	5	3
Rikiya Oishi	13	5	–	4	–
Jose Seru	8	1	–	1	–
Lote Tuqiri	1	–	2	–	1
Toshiki Yamauchi	5	–	–	6	13
Shotaro Tsuoka	12	12	–	8	5
Taichi Yoshizawa	9	–	–	–	10
Ryota Kano	–	7	9	9	–
Chihito Matsui	–	8	8	–	–
Kazuma Nakagawa	–	9	–	12	6
Takehiro Nakazawa	–	3	–	3	–
Yoshihiro Noguchi	–	6	–	7	–
Katsuyuki Sakai	–	13	–	–	7
Fisipuna Tuiaki	–	2	1	–	–
Kazuhiro Goya	–	–	12	–	–
Dai Ozawa	–	–	6	–	4
Kameli Raravou Soejima	–	–	5	–	–
Timo Fiti Sufia	–	–	4	–	2
Kosuke Hashino	–	–	–	10	–
Joseph Kamana	–	–	–	2	–
Sosiceni Tokoqio	–	–	–	13	–
Junya Matsumoto	–	–	–	–	11
Takanobu Minami	–	–	–	–	12

== South Korea ==
Head Coach: (South Korea) Seo Chun-oh

South Korea team members 2019–20
Player	Jersey number by tournament
Player	Los Angeles
Junyyoung Bang	2
Andre Jin Coquillard	1
Injo Hwang	6
Kim Hyun-soo	3
Jeongmin Jang	7
Seonmin Jang	8
Yongwoo Jeong	13
Jinhyeok Kim	9
WonYoung Kim	12
Seongbae Lee	5
Wanyong Park	4
Minsu Shin	11
Heebum Yoo	10
