= 2019 South Africa Sevens =

Rugby sevens tournament

- Sevens World Series XXI
- Host nation: South Africa
- Date: 13–15 December 2019

Cup
- Champion: New Zealand
- Runner-up: South Africa
- Third: France

Tournament details
- Matches played: 36
- Tries scored: 225 (average 6.25 per match)
- Most points: Jean-Pascal Barraque (54 points)
- Most tries: Jean-Pascal Barraque (6 tries)

The 2019 South Africa Sevens was the second tournament within the 2019–20 World Rugby Sevens Series and the 21st South Africa Sevens tournament. It was held on 13–15 December 2019 at Cape Town Stadium in Cape Town, South Africa.

Fiji, the United States and South Africa – three of the top four teams from the 2018–19 World Rugby Sevens Series – were all drawn into Pool A.

== Format ==
The 16 teams were drawn into four pools of four. Each team plays every other team in their pool once. The top two teams from each pool advance to the Cup playoffs and compete for gold, silver and bronze medals. The other teams from each pool go to the classification playoffs for 9th to 16th placings.

== Teams ==
Fifteen core teams participated in the tournament along with one invited team, Japan.

- Argentina
- Australia
- Canada
- England
- Fiji
- France
- Ireland
- Japan
- Kenya
- New Zealand
- Samoa
- Scotland
- South Africa
- Spain
- United States
- Wales

== Pool stage ==
All times in South African Standard Time (UTC+2:00)

Key to colours in group tables
| Teams that advanced to the Cup quarter-final |

=== Pool A ===
| Team | Pld | W | D | L | PF | PA | PD | Pts |
|---|---|---|---|---|---|---|---|---|
| South Africa | 3 | 3 | 0 | 0 | 96 | 29 | +67 | 9 |
| Fiji | 3 | 2 | 0 | 1 | 96 | 47 | +49 | 7 |
| United States | 3 | 1 | 0 | 2 | 71 | 49 | +22 | 5 |
| Japan | 3 | 0 | 0 | 3 | 7 | 145 | −138 | 3 |

13 December 2019
19:35

| United States | 14–28 | Fiji |
| Try: Tomasin 9' c Baker 15' c Con: Hughes (2/2) 9', 15' | Report | Try: Tuimaba (2) 5' c, 6' c Botitu 11' c Naduva 12' c Con: Bolaca (2/2) 5', 7'; Nacuqu (2/2) 11', 13' |

Cape Town Stadium
Referee: Damon Murphy (Australia)

13 December 2019
20:03

| South Africa | 49–0 | Japan |
| Try: Senatla (2) 1' c, 10' c Arendse (2) 4' c, 7' c Pretorius 8' c S. Davids 12' c Nel 14' c Con: Geduld (4/4) 2', 4', 7', 8'; Specman (3/3) 10', 12', 15' | Report |

Cape Town Stadium
Referee: Nehuén Jauri-Rivero (Argentina)

14 December 2019
13:29

| United States | 42–0 | Japan |
| Try: Isles 6' c Barrett 7' c Hughes (2) 8' c, 14' c Tomasin 11' c Williams 15'; Con: Hughes (5/5) 6', 8', 9', 14', 16'; Tomasin (1/1) 11' | Report |

Cape Town Stadium
Referee: Richard Kelly (New Zealand)

14 December 2019
13:51

| South Africa | 26–14 | Fiji |
| Try: Specman 6' c Senatla 8' m Nel 10' c Geduld 12' c Con: Geduld (3/4) 7', 11', 13' | Report | Try: Tuwai 3' c Botitu 5' c Con: Bolaca (2/2) 3', 5' |

Cape Town Stadium
Referee: Jordan Way (Australia)

14 December 2019
19:35

| Fiji | 54–7 | Japan |
| Try: Tuwai 3' c Nacuqu (3) 4' c, 7' c, 10' c Naduva 6' c Dranisinukula 10' c Vakurunabili 8' m Tuimaba 11' c Con: Nacuqu (4/4) 3', 5', 6', 7'; Bolaca (1/2) 11'; Botitu (2/2) 10', 11' | Report | Try: Hayashi 14' c Con: Nakazawa (1/1) 14' |

Cape Town Stadium
Referee: Francisco González (Uruguay)

14 December 2019
20:03

| South Africa | 21–15 | United States |
| Try: Sage 3' c Specman 5' c S. Davids 11' c Con: Geduld (3/3) 3', 6', 12' | Report | Try: Isles 7' m Leuta 13' m Baker 14' m Con: Hughes (0/2); Tomasin (0/1) |

Cape Town Stadium
Referee: Richard Haughton (England)

=== Pool B ===
| Team | Pld | W | D | L | PF | PA | PD | Pts |
|---|---|---|---|---|---|---|---|---|
| New Zealand | 3 | 3 | 0 | 0 | 95 | 26 | +69 | 9 |
| Argentina | 3 | 2 | 0 | 1 | 92 | 40 | +52 | 7 |
| Canada | 3 | 1 | 0 | 2 | 43 | 80 | −37 | 5 |
| Wales | 3 | 0 | 0 | 3 | 21 | 105 | −84 | 3 |

13 December 2019
18:35

| Argentina | 33–21 | Canada |
| Try: Sábato (2) 1' c, 8' c Schulz 5' m Luna 10' c Ulloa 12' c Con: Mare (3/4) 2', 9', 10'; Ulloa (1/1) 13' | Report | Try: Braid 3' c Sauder (2/2) 14' c, 15' c Con: Hirayama (1/1) 3' c Coats (2/2) 14', 16' |

Cape Town Stadium
Referee: Richard Haughton (England)

13 December 2019
19:05

| New Zealand | 43–7 | Wales |
| Try: Knewstubb 3' c Ware 6' m Webber 8' c Mikkelson 9' m Rokolisoa (2) 11' c, 13' c McGarvey-Black 12' m Con: Knewstubb (3/6) 3', 8', 11'; Dickson (1/1) 14' | Report | Try: Gasson 4' c Con: Treharne (1/1) 5' |

Cape Town Stadium
Referee: Francisco González (Uruguay)

14 December 2019
12:45

| Argentina | 45–0 | Wales |
| Try: Schulz (2) 3' c, 5' c Etchart 4' c Ulloa 7' c Prisciantelli 9' c González 12' m Del Mestre 15'; Con: Mare (4/4) 4', 5', 6', 7'; Ulloa (1/3) 10' | Report |

Cape Town Stadium
Referee: James Doleman (New Zealand)

14 December 2019
13:07

| New Zealand | 33–5 | Canada |
| Try: Collier 2' c Curry 8' c Mikkelson 11' m Ware 14' c Dickson 15' c Con: Baker (2/2) 2', 8'; McGarvey-Black (2/2) 14', 16'; Rokolisoa (0/1) | Report | Try: Fuailefau 9' m Con: Hirayama (0/1) |

Cape Town Stadium
Referee: Matt Rodden (Hong Kong)

14 December 2019
18:35

| Canada | 17–14 | Wales |
| Try: Sauder (2) 4' m, 9' c Mullins 7' m Con: Hirayama (1/3) 9' | Report | Try: Lewis 12' c Jones 14' c Con: Treharne (2/2) 12', 14' |

Cape Town Stadium
Referee: Richard Kelly (New Zealand)

14 December 2019
19:05

| New Zealand | 19–14 | Argentina |
| Try: Webber (2) 4', 9' c Knewstubb 10' m Con: Knewstubb (2/2) 5', 9'; McGarvey-Black (0/1) | Report | Try: Osadczuk 6' c Revol 15'; Con: Mare (1/1) 7'; Ulloa 16' |

Cape Town Stadium
Referee: Jordan Way (Australia)

=== Pool C ===
| Team | Pld | W | D | L | PF | PA | PD | Pts |
|---|---|---|---|---|---|---|---|---|
| France | 3 | 3 | 0 | 0 | 97 | 38 | +59 | 9 |
| Scotland | 3 | 2 | 0 | 1 | 67 | 67 | 0 | 7 |
| England | 3 | 1 | 0 | 2 | 69 | 66 | +3 | 5 |
| Spain | 3 | 0 | 0 | 3 | 33 | 95 | −62 | 3 |

13 December 2019
17:21

| France | 40–7 | Spain |
| Try: Veredamu 1' c Barraque 4' c Parez 8' c Lakafia 11' m Siega (2) 14' c, 16' c Con: Barraque (3/4) 2', 5', 9'; Mazzoleni (2/2) 14', 16' | Report | Try: Rodriguez-Guerra 8' c Con: Hernández (1/1) 8' |

Cape Town Stadium
Referee: Matt Rodden (Hong Kong)

13 December 2019
17:43

| England | 24–26 | Scotland |
| Try: Norton 8' m Emery 9' m Lindsay-Hague 10' c Glover 14' c Con: Bibby (2/4) 10', 14' | Report | Try: Fergusson 4' c McCann 11' c Pecqueur 12' c Sofolarin 15' m Con: Lowe (2/3) 4', 13'; Fergusson (1/1) 11' |

Cape Town Stadium
Referee: James Doleman (New Zealand)

14 December 2019
12:01

| France | 24–19 | Scotland |
| Try: Barraque 7' m Parez 8' m Penalty try 10'; Veredamu 11' c Con: Barraque (1/3) 12' | Report | Try: Pecqueur 4' c Brown 5' c Sofolarin 12' m Con: Lowe (2/3) 5', 6' |

Cape Town Stadium
Referee: Richard Haughton (England)

14 December 2019
12:23

| England | 33–7 | Spain |
| Try: Bowen 1' c Norton 4' m Edwards 6'; Lindsay-Hague 10' c Glover 14' c Con: Edwards (4/5) 1', 6', 10', 14' | Report | Try: Ramos 8' c Con: Hernández (1/1) 8' |

Cape Town Stadium
Referee: Francisco González (Uruguay)

14 December 2019
17:51

| Spain | 19–22 | Scotland |
| Try: Losada (2) 5' c, 15'; Fontes 10' c Con: Hernández (2/2) 5', 10' | Report | Try: Brown 2' m McFarland 7' c Pecqueur (2) 10' m, 12' m Con: Lowe (1/4) 8' |

Cape Town Stadium
Referee: Damon Murphy (Australia)

14 December 2019
18:13

| England | 12–33 | France |
| Try: Burgess 2' c Lindsay-Hague 14' m Con: Edwards (1/2) 3' | Report | Try: Barraque (3) 4' c, 11' c, 15' c Lakafia 9' m Siega 13' c Con: Barraque (4/5) 5', 12', 13', 15' |

Cape Town Stadium
Referee: Nehuén Jauri-Rivero (Argentina)

=== Pool D ===
| Team | Pld | W | D | L | PF | PA | PD | Pts |
|---|---|---|---|---|---|---|---|---|
| Ireland | 3 | 2 | 1 | 0 | 78 | 59 | +19 | 8 |
| Kenya | 3 | 2 | 1 | 0 | 60 | 50 | +10 | 8 |
| Australia | 3 | 1 | 0 | 2 | 52 | 52 | 0 | 5 |
| Samoa | 3 | 0 | 0 | 3 | 47 | 76 | −29 | 3 |

13 December 2019
16:37

| Australia | 21–26 | Ireland |
| Try: Pincus (2) 1' c, 14' c Hutchison 9' c Con: Coward (3/3) 2', 9', 14' | Report | Try: O'Sullivan 6' c O'Donnell 11' c Dardis 13' c Kennedy 16'; Con: Dardis (3/3) 7', 12', 13'; Roche (0/1) |

Cape Town Stadium
Referee: Richard Kelly (New Zealand)

13 December 2019
16:59

| Samoa | 19–24 | Kenya |
| Try: Perez (2) 7' c, 15' m Tuatagaloa 13' c Con: Alosio (1/1) 7'; Tuatagaloa (1/1) 14'; Vaili (0/1) | Report | Try: Sikuta 3' m Otieno 5' m Taabu 10' c Odhiambo 11' c Con: Taabu (2/4) 11', 11' |

Cape Town Stadium
Referee: Jordan Way (Australia)

14 December 2019
10:57

| Australia | 7–12 | Kenya |
| Try: Pincus 7' c Con: Holland (1/1) 8' | Report | Try: Onyala 4' c Otieno 11' m Con: Taabu (1/2) 4' |

Cape Town Stadium
Referee: Nehuén Jauri-Rivero (Argentina)

14 December 2019
11:19

| Samoa | 14–28 | Ireland |
| Try: Tuatagaloa 5' c Motuga 14' c Con: Alosio (1/1) 5', 15' | Report | Try: Conroy 8' c McNulty 8' c O'Donnell 10' c Kennedy 11' c Con: Dardis (4/4) 8', 9', 9', 11' |

Cape Town Stadium
Referee: Damon Murphy (Australia)

14 December 2019
16:47

| Ireland | 24–24 | Kenya |
| Try: Lennox 2' c O'Sullivan 5' m Conroy (2) 9' c, 16' m Con: Dardis (2/3) 3', 9'; Roche (0/1) | Report | Try: Amonde 4' c Onyala 7' c Olindi 10' m Otieno 11' m Con: Taabu (2/3) 4', 7'; Olindi (0/1) |

Cape Town Stadium
Referee: Matt Rodden (Hong Kong)

14 December 2019
17:05

| Samoa | 14–24 | Australia |
| Try: Tuitama (2) 8' c, 15' c Con: Alosio (2/2) 8', 15' | Report | Try: Turner (2) 3' m, 8' c McMahon 5' m Kennewell 6' c Con: Holland (2/4) 7', 9' |

Cape Town Stadium
Referee: James Doleman (New Zealand)

== Placement matches ==
=== Fifteenth place ===
15 December 2019
15:48

| Wales | 15–19 | Japan |
| Try: Dyer 1' m Treharne 10' m Wood 15' m Con: Treharne (0/3) | Report | Try: Kano (2) 5' c, 11'; Tuiaki 13' c Con: Fujita (1/1) 5'; Kano (1/2) 14' |

Cape Town Stadium
Referee: Damon Murphy (Australia)

=== Thirteenth place ===
15 December 2019
16:10

| Samoa | 38–7 | Spain |
| Try: Solia 6' c Tuatagaloa 7' c Tuitama 8' m Alosio 9' c Scanlan 13' c Masoe 14' m Con: Alosio (3/4) 6', 8', 10', 13'; Vaili (0/1) | Report | Try: Ramos 12' c Con: Hernández (1/1) 12' |

Cape Town Stadium
Referee: Richard Haughton (England)

=== Eleventh place ===
15 December 2019
16:32

| Australia | 5–22 | Canada |
| Try: Skelton 5' m Con: Holland (0/1) | Report | Try: Kay 3' c Berna 7' m Richard 9' m Morra 12' m Con: Kay (1/2) 4'; Braid (0/2) |

Cape Town Stadium
Referee: Nehuén Jauri-Rivero (Argentina)

=== Ninth place ===
15 December 2019
16:54

| United States | 17−12 | England |
| Try: Unufe 3' m Barrett 6' m Isles 8' c Con: Hughes (1/3) 9' | Report | Try: Lindsay-Hague 2' c Norton 13' m Con: Edwards (1/2) 3' |

Cape Town Stadium
Referee: Matt Rodden (Hong Kong)

== Knockout stage ==
=== Cup ===
Quarter-finals
15 December – 11:28 – Cape Town
South Africa | 17
Kenya | 5
15 December – 11:50 – Cape Town
France | 19
Argentina | 10
15 December – 12:12 – Cape Town
Ireland | 12
Fiji | 31
15 December – 12:34 – Cape Town
New Zealand | 35
Scotland | 19

Semi-finals
15 December – 14:44 – Cape Town
South Africa | 21
France | 14
15 December – 15:06 – Cape Town
Fiji | 7
New Zealand | 24

Cup Final
15 December – 18:56 – Cape Town
South Africa | 5
New Zealand | 7
Third place
15 December – 17:59 – Cape Town
France | 29 (a.e.t.)
Fiji | 24

==== Quarter-finals ====
15 December 2019
11:28

| South Africa | 17–5 | Kenya |
| Try: Nel (2) 5' m, 9' c S. Davids 13' m Con: Geduld (1/2) 9' | Report | Try: Otieno 3' m Con: Taabu (0/1) |

Cape Town Stadium
Referee: Richard Kelly (New Zealand)

15 December 2019
11:50

| France | 19–10 | Argentina |
| Try: Lakafia 5' c Siega 10' c Riva 14' m Con: Barraque (2/3) 5', 10' | Report | Try: Etchart 2' m Sábato 6' m Con: Mare (0/2) |

Cape Town Stadium
Referee: Jordan Way (Australia)

15 December 2019
12:12

| Ireland | 12–31 | Fiji |
| Try: Conroy 4' c Kennedy 9' m Con: Dardis (1/2) 5' | Report | Try: Bolaca 6' c Tuimaba 8' c Nacuqu (2) 11' m, 13' c Naduva 15' m Con: Bolaca (2/3) 7', 9'; Nacuqu (1/2) 14' |

Cape Town Stadium
Referee: James Doleman (New Zealand)

15 December 2019
12:34

| New Zealand | 35–19 | Scotland |
| Try: Ng Shiu (2) 3' c, 6' c Knewstubb 5' c Baker (2) 8' c, 10' c Con: Knewstubb (4/4) 4', 6', 7', 9'; Baker (1/1) 11' | Report | Try: Fife 9' m Pecqueur 13' c Bickerstaff 13' c Con: Fergusson (1/1) 13'; Lowe (1/2) 14' |

Cape Town Stadium
Referee: Francisco González (Uruguay)

==== Semi-finals ====
15 December 2019
14:44

| South Africa | 21–14 | France |
| Try: Nel 9' c Pretorius 9' c Soyizwapi 13' c Con: Geduld (3/3) 9', 10', 13' | Report | Try: O'Connor 6' c Laugel 16' c Con: Barraque (1/1) 7'; Riva 16' |

Cape Town Stadium
Referee: James Doleman (New Zealand)

15 December 2019
15:06

| Fiji | 7–24 | New Zealand |
| Try: Botitu 8' c Con: Bolaca (1/1) 8' | Report | Try: Penalty try 3'; Baker 4' c Ware 7' c Knewstubb 9'; Con: Baker (1/1) 5'; Knewstubb (0/2) |

Cape Town Stadium
Referee: Jordan Way (Australia)

==== Third place ====
15 December 2018
17:59

| France | 29–24 (a.e.t.) | Fiji |
| Try: Barraque 3' m Mignot (2) 4' m, 8' c <nt> Zeghdar 6' c Veredamu 16'; Con: Barraque (1/3) 6'; Mazzoleni (1/1) 8' | Report | Try: Tuwai 7' m Mocenacagi (2) 10' c, 11' c K. Tabu 15'; Con: Nacuqu (2/3) 10', 11'; Bolaca (0/1) |

Cape Town Stadium
Referee: Damon Murphy (Australia)

==== Final ====
15 December 2019
18:56

| South Africa | 5–7 | New Zealand |
| Try: Geduld 9' m Con: Geduld (0/1) | Report | Try: McGarvey-Black 12' c Con: Rokolisoa (1/1) 12' |

Cape Town Stadium
Referee: Jordan Way (Australia)

== Tournament placings ==
| Place | Team | Points |
|---|---|---|
| 1st place, gold medalist(s) | New Zealand | 22 |
| 2nd place, silver medalist(s) | South Africa | 19 |
| 3rd place, bronze medalist(s) | France | 17 |
| 4 | Fiji | 15 |
| 5 | Argentina | 13 |
| 6 | Ireland | 12 |
| 7 | Kenya | 11 |
| 8 | Scotland | 10 |

| Place | Team | Points |
|---|---|---|
| 9 | United States | 8 |
| 10 | England | 7 |
| 11 | Canada | 6 |
| 12 | Australia | 5 |
| 13 | Samoa | 4 |
| 14 | Spain | 3 |
| 15 | Japan | 2 |
| 16 | Wales | 1 |

== Dream Team ==
Runners-up and host team South Africa contributed three players to the tournament Dream Team.

| Forwards | Backs |
|---|---|
| (New Zealand) Scott Curry (Kenya) Alvin Otieno (South Africa) JC Pretorius | (France) Jean Pascal Barraque (South Africa) Rosko Specman (South Africa) Ruhan Nel; Jordan Conroy |

World Sevens Series XIX
| Preceded by 2019 Dubai Sevens | 2019 South Africa Sevens | Succeeded by 2019 New Zealand Sevens |
South Africa Sevens
| Preceded by 2018 South Africa Sevens | 2019 South Africa Sevens | Succeeded by 2022 South Africa Sevens |
