= 2019 Dubai Sevens =

World Rugby Sevens Series tournament

- Sevens World Series XXI
- Host nation: United Arab Emirates
- Date: 5–7 December 2019

Cup
- Champion: South Africa
- Runner-up: New Zealand
- Third: England

Tournament details
- Matches played: 28
- Tries scored: 203 (average 7.25 per match)
- Most points: Jordan Conroy (35)
- Most tries: Jordan Conroy (7)

The 2019 Dubai Sevens was the first tournament within the 2019–20 World Rugby Sevens Series and was the 20th international edition and the 50th overall of the Dubai Sevens since it began in 1970. It was held on 5–7 December 2019 at The Sevens Stadium in Dubai, United Arab Emirates.

== Background ==
The 2019 Dubai Sevens was the first of ten tournaments in the 2019–20 World Rugby Sevens Series with the tournament holding its 50th edition, with it being the 20th time that an World Series event has been held. For Ireland, they would join the series as a core team for the first time after winning the qualifier held at the 2019 Hong Kong Sevens defeating the host nation in the final by 21 points.

Throughout the off-season, qualifying for the 2020 Summer Olympics took place via the continental tournaments. Over in the Americas, Argentina and Canada qualified through to the Olympics after defeating Brazil and Jamaica respectively. The following week saw Great Britain became the eighth team to qualify after defeating France in the final at Colomiers. In early November, Australia and Kenya became the ninth and tenth team to qualify as they both won their respective regional tournaments. The final continental spot went to South Korea after defeating Hong Kong in the final of the 2019 Asia Rugby Sevens Olympic Qualifying Tournament.

== Format ==
The sixteen teams were drawn into four pools of four teams each. Every team played each of the other three in their pool once. The top two teams from each pool advanced to the Cup playoffs and competed for gold, silver and bronze medals. The other teams from each pool sent to the classification playoffs for ninth to sixteenth placings.

== Teams ==
Fifteen core teams are participating in the tournament along with one invited team, Japan:

- Argentina
- Australia
- Canada
- England
- Fiji
- France
- Japan
- Ireland
- Kenya
- New Zealand
- Samoa
- Scotland
- South Africa
- Spain
- United States
- Wales

== Pool stage ==
All times in UAE Standard Time (UTC+4:00)

Key to colours in group tables
| Teams that advanced to the Cup Quarterfinal |

=== Pool A ===
| Team | Pld | W | D | L | PF | PA | PD | Pts |
|---|---|---|---|---|---|---|---|---|
| France | 3 | 2 | 0 | 1 | 67 | 39 | 28 | 7 |
| Argentina | 3 | 2 | 0 | 1 | 67 | 40 | 27 | 7 |
| Fiji | 3 | 2 | 0 | 1 | 69 | 55 | 14 | 7 |
| Japan | 3 | 0 | 0 | 3 | 29 | 98 | –69 | 3 |

5 December 2019
18:40

| France | 12–10 | Argentina |
| Try: Siega 4'm Bouhraoua 5'c Con: Barraque (1/2) 6' | Report | Try: Bazan Velez 7'm Osadczuk 8'm Con: Mare (0/2) |

The Sevens
Referee: James Doleman (New Zealand)

5 December 2019
19:02

| Fiji | 24–17 | Japan |
| Try: Botitu 0'm Tuwai 2'm Tabu 8'c Mocenacagi 9'c Con: Nacuqu (2/4) 8', 9' | Report | Try: Fujita (2) 5'm, 13'm Ishida 14'c Con: Fujita (1/2) 14'; Yoshizawa (0/1) |

The Sevens
Referee: Francisco González (Uruguay)

6 December 2019
12:42

| France | 41–5 | Japan |
| Try: O'Connor 1'm Bouhraoua (3) 3'c, 4'm, 8'c Siega 5'c Dall'igna 10'm Con: Barraque (3/5) 3', 6', 9'; Riva (0/1); Mazzoleni (0/1) | Report | Try: Yoshizawa 14'm Con: Fujita (0/1) |

The Sevens
Referee: Matt Rodden (Hong Kong)

6 December 2019
13:04

| Fiji | 21–24 | Argentina |
| Try: Tuimaba 3'c Botitu 7'c Derenalagi 9'c Con: Botitu (1/1) 3'; Nacuqu (2/2) 8', 9' | Report | Try: Etchart 1'c Sábato 6'm Álvarez 11'c Moroni 14'm Con: Mare (1/3) 1'; Álvarez (1/1) 11' |

The Sevens
Referee: Jordan Way (Australia)

6 December 2019
18:40

| Argentina | 33–7 | Japan |
| Try: Schulz 2'c Sábato 3'c Bazan Velez 5'c Osadczuk (2) 8'c, 14'm Con: Mare (4/5) 2', 4', 6', 8' | Report | Try: Yoshizawa 7'c Con: Yoshizawa (1/1) 7' |

The Sevens
Referee: Richard Kelly (New Zealand)

6 December 2019
19:02

| Fiji | 24–14 | France |
| Try: Nacuqu 5'c Tuimaba 8'm Tuwai 10'c Naduva 13'm Con: Nacuqu (2/3) 6', 11'; Veilawa (0/1) | Report | Try: O'Connor 2'c Bouhraoua 3'c Con: Barraque (2/2) 3', 4' |

The Sevens
Referee: Nehuén Jauri-Rivero (Argentina)

=== Pool B ===
| Team | Pld | W | D | L | PF | PA | PD | Pts |
|---|---|---|---|---|---|---|---|---|
| Australia | 3 | 3 | 0 | 0 | 112 | 47 | 65 | 9 |
| United States | 3 | 2 | 0 | 1 | 67 | 64 | 3 | 7 |
| Ireland | 3 | 1 | 0 | 2 | 71 | 98 | –27 | 5 |
| Scotland | 3 | 0 | 0 | 3 | 64 | 105 | –41 | 3 |

5 December 2019
17:50

| Australia | 43–14 | Scotland |
| Try: Pincus (2) 1'c, 5'm Coward 7'c Turner 7'c Skelton 8'm Malouf 9'c Hutchison 14'm Con: Longbottom (1/2) 2'; Coward (3/4) 7', 7', 10' | Report | Try: Fergusson 3'c McFarland 13'c Con: Lowe (2/2) 3', 13' |

The Sevens
Referee: Nehuén Jauri-Rivero (Argentina)

5 December 2019
18:12

| United States | 24–19 | Ireland |
| Try: Isles 1'm Barrett (2) 5'c, 11'm Baker 9'c Con: Hughes (2/4) 6', 9' | Report | Try: O'Sullivan 4'c Kennedy 13'c Kelly 14'm Con: Dardis (1/1) 4'; Roche (1/2) 13' |

The Sevens
Referee: Richard Kelly (New Zealand)

6 December 2019
11:58

| Australia | 45–21 | Ireland |
| Try: Malouf 0'c Hutchison 2'm Turner (2) 3'c, 10'c Skelton 5'c Pincus 8'm Anderson 14'c Con: Longbottom (3/5) 1', 4', 5'; Coward (2/2) 10', 14' | Report | Try: Conroy 6'c Kennedy 9'c Dardis 12'c Con: Dardis (3/3) 6', 10', 12' |

The Sevens
Referee: James Doleman (New Zealand)

6 December 2019
12:20

| United States | 31–21 | Scotland |
| Try: Unufe 3'c Baker 7'm Schroeder 7'c Tomasin 12'm Isles 14'c Con: Hughes (3/5) 3', 8', 14' | Report | Try: Fergusson 2'c Elms 5'c Rowe 13'c Con: Fergusson (2/2) 2', 6'; Lowe (1/1) 13' |

The Sevens
Referee: Francisco González (Uruguay)

6 December 2019
17:50

| Scotland | 29–31 | Ireland |
| Try: Sofolarin (2) 2'c, 11'm Pecqueur (3) 3'm, 8'c, 12'm Con: Fergusson (2/5) 3', 8' | Report | Try: Conroy (5) 0'm, 5'c, 7'c, 9'm, 14'c Con: Dardis (2/4) 5', 7'; Roche (1/1) 14' |

The Sevens
Referee: Damon Murphy (Australia)

6 December 2019
18:12

| United States | 12–24 | Australia |
| Try: Unufe 11'c Isles 14'm Con: Hughes (1/2) 11' | Report | Try: Anderson 1'c Pincus 6'm Hutchison (2) 8'c, 13'm Con: Longbottom (2/4) 1', 9' |

The Sevens
Referee: Richard Haughton (England)

=== Pool C ===
| Team | Pld | W | D | L | PF | PA | PD | Pts |
|---|---|---|---|---|---|---|---|---|
| New Zealand | 3 | 3 | 0 | 0 | 107 | 21 | 86 | 9 |
| Samoa | 3 | 2 | 0 | 1 | 57 | 64 | –7 | 7 |
| Canada | 3 | 1 | 0 | 2 | 50 | 64 | –14 | 5 |
| Wales | 3 | 0 | 0 | 3 | 33 | 98 | –65 | 3 |

5 December 2019
17:06

| Samoa | 19–12 | Canada |
| Try: Scanlan 3'c Solia 6'm Alosio 12'c Con: Alosio (2/3) 3', 12' | Report | Try: Hirayama 1'c Morra 5'm Con: Hirayama (1/2) 2' |

The Sevens
Referee: Damon Murphy (Australia)

5 December 2019
17:28

| New Zealand | 36–7 | Wales |
| Try: Ng Shiu (2) 1'm, 7'c Baker (2) 2'c, 4'm McGarvey-Black (2) 9'c, 10'm Con: Baker (3/5) 2', 8', 10'; Knewstubb (0/1) | Report | Try: Goodchild 13'c Con: Treharne (1/1) 14' |

The Sevens
Referee: Richard Haughton (England)

6 December 2019
11:14

| Samoa | 31–12 | Wales |
| Try: Alosio 4'm Scanlan 7'c Perez 8'm Alofipo (2) 12', 14'; Con: Alosio (2/4) 7', 13'; Scanlan (1/1) 14' | Report | Try: Roach 1'm Dyer 11'c Con: Treharne (1/2) 12' |

The Sevens
Referee: Richard Kelly (New Zealand)

6 December 2019
11:36

| New Zealand | 31–7 | Canada |
| Try: Webber 2'm Rayasi (3) 5'c, 7'c, 9'm Ware 11'c Con: Knewstubb (2/3) 6', 11'; Baker (1/1) 7'; McGarvey-Black (0/1) | Report | Try: Hirayama 8'c Con: Hirayama (1/1) 8' |

The Sevens
Referee: Nehuén Jauri-Rivero (Argentina)

6 December 2019
17:06

| Canada | 31–14 | Wales |
| Try: Kaay (2) 5'm, 7'c Mullins 7'c Berna 9'; Coats 14'; Con: Hirayama (2/3) 7', 8'; Coats (1/1) 14' | Report | Try: Roach 3'c T. Lewis 13'c Con: Treharne (2/2) 3', 13' |

The Sevens
Referee: Matt Rodden (Hong Kong)

6 December 2019
17:28

| New Zealand | 40–7 | Samoa |
| Try: Knewstubb (2) 3'c, 9'c McGarvey-Black 7'c Curry 8'm Molia 11'c Rayasi 12'c Con: Knewstubb (3/4) 4', 7', 9'; McGarvey-Black (2/2) 11', 12' | Report | Try: Perez 0'm Con: Tomasi Alosio (1/1) 1' |

The Sevens
Referee: Damon Murphy (Australia)

=== Pool D ===
| Team | Pld | W | D | L | PF | PA | PD | Pts |
|---|---|---|---|---|---|---|---|---|
| South Africa | 3 | 3 | 0 | 0 | 69 | 31 | 38 | 9 |
| England | 3 | 2 | 0 | 1 | 62 | 31 | 31 | 7 |
| Spain | 3 | 1 | 0 | 2 | 34 | 88 | -54 | 5 |
| Kenya | 3 | 0 | 0 | 3 | 36 | 51 | -15 | 3 |

5 December 2019
19:32

| England | 36–7 | Spain |
| Try: Bibby 2'm Norton (2) 4'm, 7'm Emery 7'c Burgess 9'c Lindsay-Hague 13'c Con: Bibby (3/6) 7', 9', 13' | Report | Try: Hernández 0'c Con: Hernández (1/1) 1' |

The Sevens
Referee: Matt Rodden (Hong Kong)

5 December 2019
19:54

| South Africa | 17–12 | Kenya |
| Try: Oosthuizen 1'm Specman 8'c Senatla 11'm Con: Geduld (1/3) 8' | Report | Try: Otieno 3'c Onyala 5'm Con: Taabu (1/2) 4' |

The Sevens
Referee: Jordan Way (Australia)

6 December 2019
13:26

| England | 12–5 | Kenya |
| Try: Lindsay-Hague 2'c Bibby 10'm Con: Emery (1/1) 2'; Bibby (0/1) | Report | Try: Oyoo 11'm Con: Taabu (0/1) |

The Sevens
Referee: Damon Murphy (Australia)

6 December 2019
13:48

| South Africa | 33–5 | Spain |
| Try: Specman (2) 2'c, 13'c Dry 5'c Soyizwapi 7'c Pretorius 12'c Con: Geduld (2/2) 3', 6'; S. Davids (3/3) 8', 12', 14' | Report | Try: Pla 10'm Con: Hernández (0/1) |

The Sevens
Referee: Richard Haughton (England)

6 December 2019
19:32

| Spain | 22–19 | Kenya |
| Try: Pla 2'm Mateu 3'c Fontes 9'm Rodriguez-Guerra 11'm Con: Hernández (1/4) 6' | Report | Try: Olindi 0'c Oyoo 5'c Ojee 13'm Con: Taabu (2/3) 0', 6' |

The Sevens
Referee: Francisco González (Uruguay)

6 December 2019
19:54

| South Africa | 19–14 | England |
| Try: Oosthuizen 6'm Geduld (2) 8', 10'; Con: S. Davids (2/3) 8', 10' | Report | Try: Lindsay-Hague 3'c Norton 4'c Con: Bibby (2/2) 4', 5' |

The Sevens
Referee: James Doleman (New Zealand)

== Placement matches ==
=== Fifteenth place ===
7 December 2019
13:30

| Wales | 38–12 | Japan |
| Try: Dyer (2) 3'c, 14'm Jones 7'c C. Lewis 7'c Davies 10'c Cambriani 11'm Con: Treharne (4/6) 4', 7', 8', 10' | Report | Try: Yamauchi 2'm Hikosaka 5'c Con: Yoshizawa (1/2) 5' |

The Sevens
Referee: Matt Rodden (Hong Kong)

=== Thirteenth place ===
7 December 2019
13:52

| Kenya | 26–14 | Scotland |
| Try: Sikuta 5'c Onyala 7'c Olindi 10'c Otieno 13'm Con: Taabu (3/4) 5', 7', 10' | Report | Try: Pecqueur 8'c Elms 14'c Con: Lowe (2/2) 9', 14' |

The Sevens
Referee: Francisco González (Uruguay)

=== Eleventh place ===
7 December 2019
15:44

| Ireland | 14–19 | Spain |
| Try: Lennox 7'c Conroy 12'c Con: Dardis (2/2) 7', 13' | Report | Try: Sainz-Trapaga (2) 4'c, 6'm Ramos 10'c Con: Hernández (1/2) 4'; Fontes (1/1) 11' |

The Sevens
Referee: Richard Haughton (England)

=== Ninth place ===
7 December 2019
16:06

| Fiji | 40–17 | Canada |
| Try: Derenalagi 3'c Bolaca 7'm Tuimaba 7'c Nacuqu (2) 11'c, 12'c Tamani 14'c Con: Botitu (1/2) 3'; Bolaca (1/1) 7'; Tamani (3/3) 11', 13', 14' | Report | Try: Jones (2) 2'm, 10'c Hirayama 9'm Con: Hirayama (1/3) 10' |

The Sevens
Referee: James Doleman (New Zealand)

== Cup ==
Quarter-finals
7 December 2019 – 11:14 – The Sevens
France | 12
England | 19
7 December 2019 – 11:36 – The Sevens
New Zealand | 26
United States | 5
7 December 2019 – 11:58 – The Sevens
South Africa | 12
Argentina | 5
7 December 2019 – 12:20 – The Sevens
Australia | 14
Samoa | 19

Semi-finals
7 December 2019 – 15:00 – The Sevens
England | 12
New Zealand | 19
7 December 2019 – 15:22 – The Sevens
South Africa | 38
Samoa | 7

Cup Final
7 December 2019 – 19:02 – The Sevens
New Zealand | 0
South Africa | 15
Third place
7 December 2019 – 18:00 – The Sevens
England | 19
Samoa | 17

Matches

Quarter-finals

7 December 2019
11:14

| France | 12–19 | England |
| Try: Barraque 3'c Bouhraoua 9'm Con: Barraque (1/2) 4' | Report | Try: Ellery 7'm Norton 11'm Muir 14'c Con: Bibby (2/3) 11', 14' |

The Sevens
Referee: Damon Murphy (Australia)

7 December 2019
11:36

| New Zealand | 26–5 | United States |
| Try: Webber 3'c Ware (2) 6'm, 10'c Collier 13'm Con: Baker (3/4) 3', 11', 13' | Report | Try: Isles 14'm Con: Tomasin (0/1) |

The Sevens
Referee: Jordan Way (Australia)

7 December 2019
11:58

| South Africa | 12–5 | Argentina |
| Try: Geduld 1'm Specman 5'c Con: Geduld (1/2) 6' | Report | Try: Osadczuk 9'm Con: Mare (0/1) |

The Sevens
Referee: Richard Kelly (New Zealand)

7 December 2019
12:20

| Australia | 14–19 | Samoa |
| Try: Penalty Try 4'; Longbottom 7'c Con: Longbottom (1/1) 7' | Report | Try: Tuatagaloa 1'c Perez (2) 9', 12'; Con: Alosio (2/3) 2', 10' |

The Sevens
Referee: Nehuén Jauri-Rivero (Argentina)

Semi-finals

7 December 2019
15:00

| England | 12–19 | New Zealand |
| Try: Norton 3'c Glover 12'm Con: Bibby (1/2) 4' | Report | Try: Knewstubb 7'm Ware 10'c Rayasi 13'c Con: McGarvey-Black (2/2) 10', 13'; Baker (0/1) |

The Sevens
Referee: Damon Murphy (Australia)

7 December 2019
15:22

| South Africa | 38–7 | Samoa |
| Try: Z. Davids 3'c Dry 5'm Soyizwapi 6'c Nel 9'm Senatla 10'c S. Davids 11'c Con: Geduld (2/3) 3', 7'; S. Davids (2/3) 10', 12' | Report | Try: Scanlan 1'c Con: Alosio (1/1) 1' |

The Sevens
Referee: Richard Kelly (New Zealand)

3rd place

7 December 2019
18:00

| England | 19–17 | Samoa |
| Try: Bowen 0'c de Carpentier 5'c Muir 11'm Con: Bibby (2/2) 0', 5'; Emery (0/1) | Report | Try: Motuga 2'm Scanlan 3'c Solia 7'm Con: Alosio (1/3) 4' |

The Sevens
Referee: Nehuén Jauri-Rivero (Argentina)

Cup Final

7 December 2019
19:02

| New Zealand | 0–15 | South Africa |
| | Report | Try: Soyizwapi 6'm Dry 9'm Senatla 13'm Con: Geduld (0/2); S. Davids (0/1) |

The Sevens
Referee: Jordan Way (Australia)

== Tournament placings ==
| Place | Team | Points |
|---|---|---|
| 1st place, gold medalist(s) | South Africa | 22 |
| 2nd place, silver medalist(s) | New Zealand | 19 |
| 3rd place, bronze medalist(s) | England | 17 |
| 4 | Samoa | 15 |
| 5 | Australia | 13 |
| 6 | France | 12 |
| 7 | Argentina | 11 |
| 8 | United States | 10 |

| Place | Team | Points |
|---|---|---|
| 9 | Fiji | 8 |
| 10 | Canada | 7 |
| 11 | Spain | 6 |
| 12 | Ireland | 5 |
| 13 | Kenya | 4 |
| 14 | Scotland | 3 |
| 15 | Wales | 2 |
| 16 | Japan | 1 |

Source: World Rugby

== Players ==
Dream Team
| Forwards | Backs |
|---|---|
| (New Zealand) Scott Curry (New Zealand) Tone Ng Shiu (Australia) Lachie Anderson | (South Africa) Rosko Specman (England) Dan Bibby (Samoa) Tomasio Alosio; Jordan Conroy |

== See also ==
- 2019 Dubai Women's Sevens
- World Rugby Sevens Series
- 2019–20 World Rugby Sevens Series

World Sevens Series XIX
| Preceded by None (first event) | 2019 Dubai Sevens | Succeeded by 2019 South Africa Sevens |
Dubai Sevens
| Preceded by 2018 Dubai Sevens | 2019 Dubai Sevens | Succeeded by 2021 Dubai Sevens |
