= 2020 Canada Sevens =

Rugby Sevens tournament hosted in Canada

- Sevens World Series XXI
- Host nation: Canada
- Date: 7–8 March 2020

Cup
- Champion: New Zealand
- Runner-up: Australia
- Third: Canada

Tournament details
- Matches played: 45
- Tries scored: 267 (average 5.93 per match)
- Most points: (Canada) Nathan Hirayama (43)
- Most tries: (Ireland) Jordan Conroy (7) (Australia) Lachie Anderson (7)

The 2020 Canada Sevens was a rugby sevens tournament held at BC Place in Vancouver on 7–8 March 2020. The tournament was the seventh event of the 2019–20 Sevens World Series for men's teams, and the fifth edition of the Canada Sevens.

== Format ==
The sixteen are drawn into four pools of four teams. Each team plays every other team in their pool once. The top two teams from each pool advance to the Cup playoffs and compete for gold, silver and bronze medals. The other teams from each pool go to the classification playoffs for ninth to sixteenth placings.

== Teams ==
Fifteen core teams played in the tournament along with one invitational team, Japan.

- Argentina
- Australia
- Canada
- England
- Fiji
- France
- Ireland
- Japan
- Kenya
- New Zealand
- Samoa
- Scotland
- South Africa
- Spain
- United States
- Wales

== Pool stage ==
All times in Pacific Standard Time (UTC−08:00). The pools were scheduled as follows:

Key: Team advanced to the quarterfinals

=== Pool A ===
Team	W	D	L	PF	PA	PD	Pts
South Africa	3	0	0	67	5	+62	9
England	2	0	1	60	38	+22	7
Japan	0	1	2	14	55	−41	4
Argentina	0	1	2	19	62	−43	4

7 March 2020
9:44

England	31–0	Argentina
Try: Edwards (2) 2'c, 6'c Bowen 8'm Burgess 10'c Emery 11'm Con: Mitchell (3/4) 3', 6', 10'; Edwards (0/1)	Report

BC Place, Vancouver
Referee: Craig Evans (Wales)

7 March 2020
10:06

South Africa	12–0	Japan
Try: du Plessis 5'c Makata 6'm Con: du Preez (1/2) 5'	Report

BC Place, Vancouver
Referee: Francisco González (Uruguay)

7 March 2020
12:56

England	29–0	Japan
Try: Davis (2) 0'm, 4'm Bowen 2'm Emery 7'c Kerr 9'c Con: Mitchell (1/4) 7'; Edwards (1/1) 9'	Report

BC Place, Vancouver
Referee: Damián Schneider (Argentina)

7 March 2020
13:18

South Africa	17–5	Argentina
Try: du Plessis 3'c Oosthuizen 9'm Gans 12'; Con: du Preez (1/1) 4'; S. Davids (0/1)	Report	Try: Moneta 1'c Con: Revol (0/1)

BC Place, Vancouver
Referee: Richard Haughton (England)

7 March 2020
16:08

Argentina	14–14	Japan
Try: Osadczuk (2) 4'c, 14'c Con: Revol (2/2) 5', 14'	Report	Try: Tsuoka 6'c Hayashi 13'c Con: Yoshizawa (1/1) 7'; Sakai (1/1) 13'

BC Place, Vancouver
Referee: Matt Rodden (Hong Kong)

7 March 2020
16:30

South Africa	38–0	England
Try: du Plessis (3) 1'c, 3'c, 8'c Gans 6'm Davids 10'c Dry 12'm Con: du Preez (3/4) 1', 4', 8'; Davids (1/2) 11'	Report

BC Place, Vancouver
Referee: Damon Murphy (Australia)

=== Pool B ===
Team	W	D	L	PF	PA	PD	Pts
Canada	3	0	0	86	49	+37	9
Fiji	2	0	1	73	62	+11	7
Wales	1	0	2	47	74	–27	5
France	0	0	3	57	78	−21	3

7 March 2020
11:15

France	21–31	Canada
Try: Veredamu (2) 8'c, 9'c Dumortier 14'c Con: Riva (2/2) 8', 10'; Colombet (1/1) 14'	Report	Try: Hirayama 1'c Hammond 4'c Jones 5'm Berna 6'c Braid 11'm Con: Hirayama (3/5) 1', 4', 7'

BC Place, Vancouver
Referee: Sam Grove-White (Scotland)

7 March 2020
11:37

Fiji	26–19	Wales
Try: Vakurunabili (2) 1'c, 3'c Bolaca 7'm Derenalagi 12'c Con: Bolaca (2/3) 1', 3'; Nacuqu (1/1) 12'	Report	Try: Woolerton 7'; Treharne 8'c Smith 10'c Con: Treharne (2/2) 9', 10'

BC Place, Vancouver
Referee: Jérémy Rozier (France)

7 March 2020
14:27

France	19–21	Wales
Try: Dumortier (2) 1'c, 11'c Riva 6'm Con: Riva (1/2) 2'; Parez (1/1) 11'	Report	Try: Benjamin 8'c Carson 10'c Lewis 14'c Con: Treharne (2/2) 8', 10'; Davies (1/1) 14'

BC Place, Vancouver
Referee: Matt Rodden (Hong Kong)

7 March 2020
14:49

Fiji	21–26	Canada
Try: Bolaca 1'c Tuivuaka 7'c Naduva 14'c Con: Bolaca (2/2) 2', 7'; Nacuqu (1/1) 14'	Report	Try: Sauder (2) 0'm, 6'c Kay 12'c Douglas 13'c Con: Kay (2/3) 6', 12'; Hirayama (1/1) 13'

BC Place, Vancouver
Referee: Damon Murphy (Australia)

7 March 2020
18:05

Canada	29–7	Wales
Try: Hirayama 0'm Jones 2'm Kaay 4'm Kay 6'c Sauder 13'c Con: Hirayama (2/5) 6', 13'	Report	Try: Thomas 12'c Con: Treharne (1/1) 12'

BC Place, Vancouver
Referee: Damián Schneider (Argentina)

7 March 2020
18:33

Fiji	26–17	France
Try: Bolaca 2'c Tuwai 6'm Tuivuaka 9'c Naduva 10'c Con: Bolaca (3/4) 3', 10', 11'	Report	Try: Riva 1'c Jacquelin 13'm Bouhraoua 14'c Con: Riva (2/3) 2', 14'

BC Place, Vancouver
Referee: Richard Haughton (England)

=== Pool C ===
Team	W	D	L	PF	PA	PD	Pts
New Zealand	3	0	0	93	24	+69	9
Spain	2	0	1	45	71	–26	7
Ireland	1	0	2	64	73	–9	5
Kenya	0	0	3	26	60	−34	3

7 March 2020
10:31

Ireland	26–28	Spain
Try: Conroy (2) 0'c, 13'c Kennedy 4'm Horan 11'c Con: Dardis (3/4) 0', 11', 13'	Report	Try: Mateu 2'c Hernández 6'c Alonso 8'c Sainz-Trapaga 14'c Con: Hernández (4/4) 3', 6', 9', 14'

BC Place, Vancouver
Referee: Matt Rodden (Hong Kong)

7 March 2020
10:53

New Zealand	29–0	Kenya
Try: Ravouvou 2'c Koroi (2) 4'm, 8'c Ng Shiu 7'm Clarke 11'm Con: Koroi (2/4) 2', 8'; Rokolisoa (0/1)	Report

BC Place, Vancouver
Referee: Damon Murphy (Australia)

7 March 2020
13:43

Ireland	14–12	Kenya
Try: Roche 1'c Curtis 7'c Con: Roche (2/2) 2', 7'	Report	Try: Onyala 3'm Odhiambo 5'c Con: Injera (1/2) 6'

BC Place, Vancouver
Referee: Craig Evans (Wales)

7 March 2020
14:05

New Zealand	31–0	Spain
Try: Knewstubb 0'c Mikkelson 3'c Dickson 5'm Clarke 7'c Ravouvou 13'm Con: Koroi (3/4) 1', 4', 7'; Rokolisoa (0/1)	Report

BC Place, Vancouver
Referee: Francisco González (Uruguay)

7 March 2020
17:07

Spain	17–14	Kenya
Try: Fontes 1'm Pol Pla 4'm Sainz-Trapaga 12'c Con: Hernández (1/3) 13'	Report	Try: Injera (2) 2'c, 9'c Con: Oliech (2/2) 3', 9'

BC Place, Vancouver
Referee: Jérémy Rozier (France)

7 March 2020
17:35

New Zealand	33–24	Ireland
Try: Rokoliosa (2) 1', 7'; Clarke 6'c Koroi 12'm Nicole 13'c Con: Rokolisoa (1/1) 1'; Knewstubb (2/2) 7', 7'; Koroi (1/2) 13'	Report	Try: Turner 3'c Kelly (2) 4'm, 10'c Conroy 9'm Con: Roche (1/2) 3'; Dardis (1/2) 10'

BC Place, Vancouver
Referee: Sam Grove-White (Scotland)

=== Pool D ===
Team	W	D	L	PF	PA	PD	Pts
Australia	3	0	0	102	38	+64	9
United States	2	0	1	54	46	+8	7
Scotland	0	1	2	50	80	−30	4
Samoa	0	1	2	36	78	−42	4

7 March 2020
9:00

United States	19–5	Samoa
Try: Baker 1'm Brown 4'c Iosefo 8'c Con: Hughes (1/2) 4'; Tomasin (1/1) 9'	Report	Try: Maliko 12'm Con: Matavao (0/1)

BC Place, Vancouver
Referee: Richard Haughton (England)

7 March 2020
9:22

Australia	33–19	Scotland
Try: Anderson (2) 3'c, 6'm Pincus 4'c Miller 7'c Anstee 12'c Con: Holland (4/5) 3', 5', 7', 12'	Report	Try: Farndale 1'c Brown 8'm Rowe 13'c Con: Lowe (1/2) 2'; Elms (1/1) 14'

BC Place, Vancouver
Referee: Damián Schneider (Argentina)

7 March 2020
12:12

United States	28–12	Scotland
Try: Unufe (2) 2'c, 6'c Hughes 11'c Tomasin 12'c Con: Hughes (3/3) 3', 7', 11'; Tomasin (1/1) 13'	Report	Try: Rowe 7'c Elms 14'm Con: Lowe (1/1) 8'm Fergusson (0/1)

BC Place, Vancouver
Referee: Jérémy Rozier (France)

7 March 2020
12:34

Australia	40–12	Samoa
Try: Anstee 1'c Miller 2'm Anderson 3'c Pincus 6'c Turner 8'c Dunbar 11'c Con: Holland (4/5) 1', 4', 6', 9'; Dunbar (1/1) 11'	Report	Try: Filipo 8'c Alosio 12'm Con: Matavao (1/2) 9'

BC Place, Vancouver
Referee: Sam Grove-White (Scotland)

7 March 2020
15:24

Samoa	19–19	Scotland
Try: Scanlan 7'm Maliko 11'c Alosio 12'c Con: Scanlan (1/1) 12'; Alosio (1/1) 12'; Matavao (0/1)	Report	Try: McFarland 3'c Elms 9'm Farndale 10'c Con: Fergusson (2/3) 3', 11'

BC Place, Vancouver
Referee: Francisco González (Uruguay)

7 March 2020
15:46

Australia	29–7	United States
Try: Miller (3) 0'm, 5'm, 12'c Hutchison (2) 8'm, 9'c Con: Holland (2/5) 9', 12'	Report	Try: Tomasin 2'c Con: Hughes (1/1) 3'

BC Place, Vancouver
Referee: Craig Evans (Wales)

== Knockout stage ==
=== Thirteenth place ===
13th place semifinals
8 March 2020 – 12:54 – BC Place
Japan	12
Ireland	21
8 March 2020 – 13:16 – BC Place
Argentina	31
Wales	7

13th place final
8 March 2020 – 15:58 – BC Place
Ireland	31 (a.e.t.)
Argentina	26

Matches

13th place semifinals

8 March 2020
12:54

Japan	12–21	Ireland
	Report

BC Place, Vancouver

8 March 2020
13:16

Argentina	31–7	Wales
	Report

BC Place, Vancouver

13th place final

8 March 2020
15:58

Ireland	(a.e.t.) 31–26	Argentina
	Report

BC Place, Vancouver

=== Ninth place ===
9th place quarterfinals
8 March 2020 – 9:43 – BC Place
Japan	19
Samoa	50
8 March 2020 – 10:05 – BC Place
Ireland	21
France	22
8 March 2020 – 10:27 – BC Place
Scotland	28
Argentina	17
8 March 2020 – 10:49 – BC Place
Wales	0
Kenya	28

9th place semifinals
8 March 2020 – 13:38 – BC Place
Samoa	0
France	19
8 March 2020 – 14:00 – BC Place
Scotland	12
Kenya	7

9th place final
8 March 2020 – 17:07 – BC Place
France	7
Scotland	12

Matches

9th place quarterfinals

8 March 2020
9:43

Japan	19–50	Samoa
	Report

BC Place, Vancouver

8 March 2020
10:05

Ireland	21–22	France
	Report

BC Place, Vancouver

8 March 2020
10:27

Scotland	28–17	Argentina
	Report

BC Place, Vancouver

8 March 2020
10:49

Wales	0–28	Kenya
	Report

BC Place, Vancouver

9th place semifinals

8 March 2020
13:38

Samoa	0–19	France
	Report

BC Place, Vancouver

8 March 2020
14:00

Scotland	12–7	Kenya
	Report

BC Place, Vancouver

9th place final

8 March 2020
17:07

France	7–12	Scotland
	Report

BC Place, Vancouver

=== Fifth place ===
5th place semifinals
8 March 2020 – 14:30 – BC Place
United States	40
Fiji	14
8 March 2020 – 14:52 – BC Place
England	26
Spain	17

5th place final
8 March 2020 – 17:31 – BC Place
United States	24
England	26

Matches

5th place semifinals

8 March 2020
14:30

United States	40–14	Fiji
	Report

BC Place, Vancouver

8 March 2020
14:52

England	26–17	Spain
	Report

BC Place, Vancouver

5th place final

8 March 2020
17:31

United States	24–26	England
	Report

BC Place, Vancouver

=== Cup ===
Quarterfinals
8 March 2020 – 11:19 – BC Place
South Africa	26
United States	10
8 March 2020 – 11:41 – BC Place
New Zealand	17
Fiji	5
8 March 2020 – 12:03 – BC Place
Australia	31
England	12
8 March 2020 – 12:25 – BC Place
Canada	21
Spain	0

Semifinals
8 March 2020 – 15:14 – BC Place
South Africa	15
New Zealand	27
8 March 2020 – 15:36 – BC Place
Australia	19
Canada	14

Final
8 March 2020 – 18:28 – BC Place
New Zealand	17
Australia	14
Bronze final
8 March 2020 – 17:58 – BC Place
South Africa	19
Canada	26

Matches

Quarterfinals

8 March 2020
11:19

South Africa	26–10	United States
	Report

BC Place, Vancouver

8 March 2020
11:41

New Zealand	17–5	Fiji
	Report

BC Place, Vancouver

8 March 2020
12:03

Australia	31–12	England
	Report

BC Place, Vancouver

8 March 2020
12:25

Canada	21–0	Spain
	Report

BC Place, Vancouver

Semifinals

8 March 2020
15:14

South Africa	15–27	New Zealand
	Report

BC Place, Vancouver

8 March 2020
15:36

Australia	19–14	Canada
	Report

BC Place, Vancouver

Bronze final

8 March 2020
17:58

South Africa	19–26	Canada
	Report

BC Place, Vancouver

Final

8 March 2020
18:28

New Zealand	17–14	Australia
	Report

BC Place, Vancouver

== Tournament placings ==
Place	Team	Points
1st place, gold medalist(s)	New Zealand	22
2nd place, silver medalist(s)	Australia	19
3rd place, bronze medalist(s)	Canada	17
4	South Africa	15
5	England	13
6	United States	12
7	Fiji	11
8	Spain	10

Place	Team	Points
9	Scotland	8
10	France	7
11	Kenya	6
12	Samoa	5
13	Ireland	4
14	Argentina	3
15	Wales	2
16	Japan	1

World Sevens Series XXI
Preceded by 2020 USA Sevens	2020 Canada Sevens	Succeeded by 2020 London Sevens
Canada Sevens
Preceded by 2019 Canada Sevens	2020 Canada Sevens	Succeeded by 2021 Canada Sevens
