= Seo Chun-oh =

- Born: 3 August 1967 (age 59)

Rugby union career
- Position: Centre
International career
Years	Team	Apps	(Points)
- South Korea
Coaching career
- Years: Team
- South Korea

Seo Chun-oh (born 3 August 1967) is a South Korean rugby sevens coach. He coached the South Korean sevens team at the 2020 Summer Olympics in Japan.

He played as a centre for South Korea in the mid-1980s. In 2019, he helped South Korea secure a spot in the Tokyo Summer Olympics.
