= 2019–20 World Rugby Sevens Series =

21st annual international series of tournaments in men's rugby sevens

2019–20 World Rugby Sevens
- Series XXI
- Hosts: United Arab Emirates; South Africa; New Zealand; Australia; United States; Canada
- Date: 5 December 2019 – 8 March 2020

Final positions
- Champions: New Zealand
- Runners-up: South Africa
- Third: Fiji

Series details
- Top try scorer: Jordan Conroy (30)
- Top point scorer: Napolioni Bolaca (159)

The 2019–20 World Rugby Sevens Series was the 21st annual series of rugby sevens tournaments for national men's rugby sevens teams. The Sevens Series has been run by World Rugby since 1999–2000.

In March 2020, World Rugby postponed all remaining tournaments in the series due to the COVID-19 pandemic. The events in London and Paris were postponed provisionally until September, preceding the Singapore and Hong Kong events previously postponed until October. On 30 June, the remaining four rounds of the series was cancelled which meant that New Zealand was awarded the title by 11 points over second-placed South Africa.

== Format ==
Sixteen nations competed at each event, drawn into four pools of four teams each. Following the pool matches at each tournament, the top eight teams (two teams from each pool) played off for a Cup, with gold, silver and bronze medals also awarded to the first three teams. The bottom eight teams after the pool matches played off for the lower-ranked placings from ninth to sixteenth at each tournament. The winner of the series was determined by the overall points standings gained across all events in the season.

=== Challenger Series and the COVID-19 pandemic ===
World Rugby announced in December 2019 that there would be a feeder competition to the Sevens Series consisting of sixteen teams that would play two sevens events in South America, determining the final eight teams to play in a playoff-style event at the Hong Kong Sevens. The final winner would be promoted to the World Rugby Sevens Series and replace the invitational side in the Sevens Series.

As a result of the COVID-19 pandemic, World Rugby postponed the Sevens Series and Challenger Series seasons to be completed at a later date in the year before subsequently cancelling the season entirely. Because of both competitions seasons being cancelled, the final playoff in Hong Kong to decide the team who would be promoted to the Sevens Series would not be decided and the team with the highest points tally would be the promoted team. Japan, an invited team to five of the six Sevens Series events was promoted having accumulated thirty-nine points in total, three points clear at the top of the table.

== Core teams ==
The fifteen "core teams" qualified to participate in all series events for 2019–20 were:

- Argentina
- Australia
- Canada
- England
- Fiji
- France
- Ireland
- Kenya
- New Zealand
- Samoa
- Scotland
- South Africa
- Spain
- United States
- Wales

Ireland joined as a core team for the first time after winning the 2019–20 World Series qualifier held in Hong Kong. They replaced Japan who were relegated after finishing as the lowest-placed core team in 2018–19. However, Japan will play in several tournaments as the wild card team in preparation to host the Olympic tournament.

== Tour venues ==
The official schedule for the 2019–20 World Rugby Sevens Series was:

2019–20 Itinerary
Leg	Stadium	City	Dates	Winner
Dubai	The Sevens	Dubai	5–7 December 2019	South Africa
South Africa	Cape Town Stadium	Cape Town	13–15 December 2019	New Zealand
New Zealand	FMG Stadium Waikato	Hamilton	25–26 January 2020	New Zealand
Australia	Bankwest Stadium	Sydney	1–2 February 2020	Fiji
United States	Dignity Health Sports Park	Los Angeles	29 February – 1 March 2020	South Africa
Canada	BC Place	Vancouver	7–8 March 2020	New Zealand
Hong Kong	Hong Kong Stadium	Hong Kong	3–5 April 2020	Cancelled
Singapore	National Stadium	Singapore	11–12 April 2020	Cancelled
London	Twickenham Stadium	London	23–24 May 2020	Cancelled
Paris	Stade Jean-Bouin	Paris	30–31 May 2020	Cancelled

Events in Singapore and Hong Kong were originally scheduled to be played in April 2020 but were postponed due to health concerns relating to the COVID-19 pandemic and rescheduled to October 2020. In June 2020, World Rugby cancelled all four remaining rounds of the tournament (Singapore, Hong Kong, England and France) due to the pandemic.

== Standings ==
The final standings after completion of the six tournaments of the series are shown in the table below.

The points awarded to teams at each tournament, as well as the overall season totals, are shown. Gold indicates the event champions. Silver indicates the event runner-ups. Bronze indicates the event third place finishers. A dash (–) is recorded in the event column if a team did not compete at a tournament.

Official standings for the 2019–20 series:

2019–20 World Rugby Sevens – Series XXI
Pos.	Event Team	Dubai	Cape Town	Hamilton	Sydney	Los Angeles	Vancouver	Points total
1	New Zealand	19	22	22	13	17	22	115
2	South Africa	22	19	7	19	22	15	104
3	Fiji	8	15	8	22	19	11	83
4	Australia	13	5	17	12	15	19	81
5	England	17	7	15	15	10	13	77
6	France	12	17	19	8	11	7	74
7	United States	10	8	12	17	13	12	72
8	Canada	7	6	13	7	7	17	57
9	Argentina	11	13	11	10	8	3	56
10	Ireland	5	12	5	11	12	4	49
11	Scotland	3	10	6	6	4	8	37
12	Kenya	4	11	10	1	3	6	35
13	Samoa	15	4	2	2	5	5	33
14	Spain	6	3	4	4	6	10	33
15	Wales (Note: World Rugby announced that there would be no relegation this season. Therefore, Wales, who would have been relegated as the lowest placed core team, re-qualified as a core team for the next World Rugby Sevens Series.)	2	1	1	5	2	2	13
16	Japan (Note: Although not a core team, Japan was invited to five of the six series events that were played. Japan was subsequently promoted from the World Rugby Sevens Challenger Series as they finished with the most points in the two-event series.)	1	2	3	3	–	1	10
17	South Korea	–	–	–	–	1	–	1

Source: World Rugby

Legend
Event Medalists
Gold	Event Champions
Silver	Event Runner-ups
Bronze	Event Third place finishers
Qualification for the 2020–21 World Rugby Sevens Series
No colour	Core team in 2019–20 and re-qualified as a core team for the 2020–21 World Rugby Sevens Series
Yellow	Invited team

== Players ==
=== Scoring leaders ===
Tries scored
Rank	Player	Tries
1	Jordan Conroy	30
2	Carlin Isles	22
3	Aminiasi Tuimaba	20
4	Perry Baker	19
5	Terry Kennedy	17

Points scored
Rank	Player	Points
1	Napolioni Bolaca	159
2	Jordan Conroy	150
3	Nathan Hirayama	141
4	Lewis Holland	125
5	Waisea Nacuqu	124

Updated: 11 March 2020

== Tournaments ==
=== Dubai ===
Event	Winner	Score	Finalist
Cup	South Africa	15–0	New Zealand
Bronze	England	19–17	Samoa
5th Place	Australia	Tournament Points Difference 60–21	France
7th Place	Argentina	Tournament Points Difference 20–(-18)	United States
9th Place	Fiji	40–17	Canada
11th Place	Spain	19–14	Ireland
13th Place	Kenya	29–24	Scotland
15th Place	Wales	38–12	Japan

=== Cape Town ===
Event	Winner	Score	Finalist
Cup	New Zealand	7–5	South Africa
Bronze	France	29–24 (a.e.t.)	Fiji
5th Place	Argentina	Tournament Points Difference 43–0	Ireland
7th Place	Kenya	Tournament Points Difference (-2)–(-16)	Scotland
9th Place	United States	17–12	England
11th Place	Canada	22–5	Australia
13th Place	Samoa	38–7	Spain
15th Place	Japan	19–15	Wales

=== Hamilton ===
Event	Winner	Score	Finalist
Cup	New Zealand	27–5	France
Bronze	Australia	33–21	England
5th Place	Canada	28–7	United States
7th Place	Argentina	19–17	Kenya
9th Place	Fiji	12–5	South Africa
11th Place	Scotland	24–19	Ireland
13th Place	Spain	19–15	Japan
15th Place	Samoa	21–7	Wales

=== Sydney ===
Event	Winner	Score	Finalist
Cup	New Zealand	27–5	France
Bronze	Australia	33–21	England
5th Place	Canada	28–7	United States
7th Place	Argentina	19–17	Kenya
9th Place	Fiji	12–5	South Africa
11th Place	Scotland	24–19	Ireland
13th Place	Spain	19–15	Japan
15th Place	Samoa	21–7	Wales

=== Los Angeles ===
Event	Winner	Score	Finalist
Cup	South Africa	29–24 (a.e.t.)	Fiji
Bronze	New Zealand	21–19	Australia
5th Place	United States	24–19	Ireland
7th Place	France	Tournament Points Difference (-20)–(-44)	England
9th Place	Argentina	21–19	Canada
11th Place	Spain	Tournament Points Difference 2–(-30)	Samoa
13th Place	Scotland	29–24 (a.e.t.)	Kenya
15th Place	Wales	Tournament Points Difference (-92)–(-149)	South Korea

=== Vancouver ===
Event	Winner	Score	Finalist
Cup	New Zealand	17–14	Australia
Bronze	Canada	26–19	South Africa
5th Place	England	26–24	United States
7th Place	Fiji	Tournament Points Difference (-27)–(-56)	Spain
9th Place	France	7–12	Scotland
11th Place	Kenya	Tournament Points Difference (-11)–(-30)	Samoa
13th Place	Ireland	31–26 (a.e.t.)	Argentina
15th Place	Wales	Tournament Points Difference (-79)–(-81)	Japan

== See also ==
- 2019–20 World Rugby Women's Sevens Series
- Rugby sevens at the 2020 Summer Olympics

== Sources ==
- "Terms of participation: HSBC World Rugby Sevens Series" (PDF). World Rugby. 2018.
