= Lloyd Lewis =

Lloyd Lewis may refer to:

- Lloyd A. Lewis, theologian at the Virginia Theological Seminary
- Lloyd E. Lewis, Jr., former member of the Ohio House of Representatives
- Loyd Lewis (born 1962), American gridiron football player in the USFL and CFL

== See also ==
- Lloyd Lewis House, a historic building in Libertyville, Illinois, US
- Lewis Lloyd (born 1959), retired American basketball player
- Lewis Vivian Loyd (1852–1908), British Conservative Party politician
