= Eduardo López =

Eduardo López may refer to:

- Eduardo López (fencer) (1926–?), Guatemalan Olympic fencer
- Eduardo López (film editor), Argentine film editor
- Eduardo López Banzo (born 1961), Spanish harpsichordist and conductor
- Eduardo López de Romaña (1847–1912), President of Peru
- Eduardo López Ochoa (1877–1936), Spanish general
- Eduardo Alejandro López (born 1989), Argentine footballer
- Eduardo López Alcaraz (born 1964), American artist who uses the pseudonym Lalo Alcaraz
- Eduardo López Rivas (1850–1913), Venezuelan journalist

== See also ==
- Javier Eduardo López (born 1994), Mexican footballer
