= Vilimoni Koroi =

New Zealand rugby union player

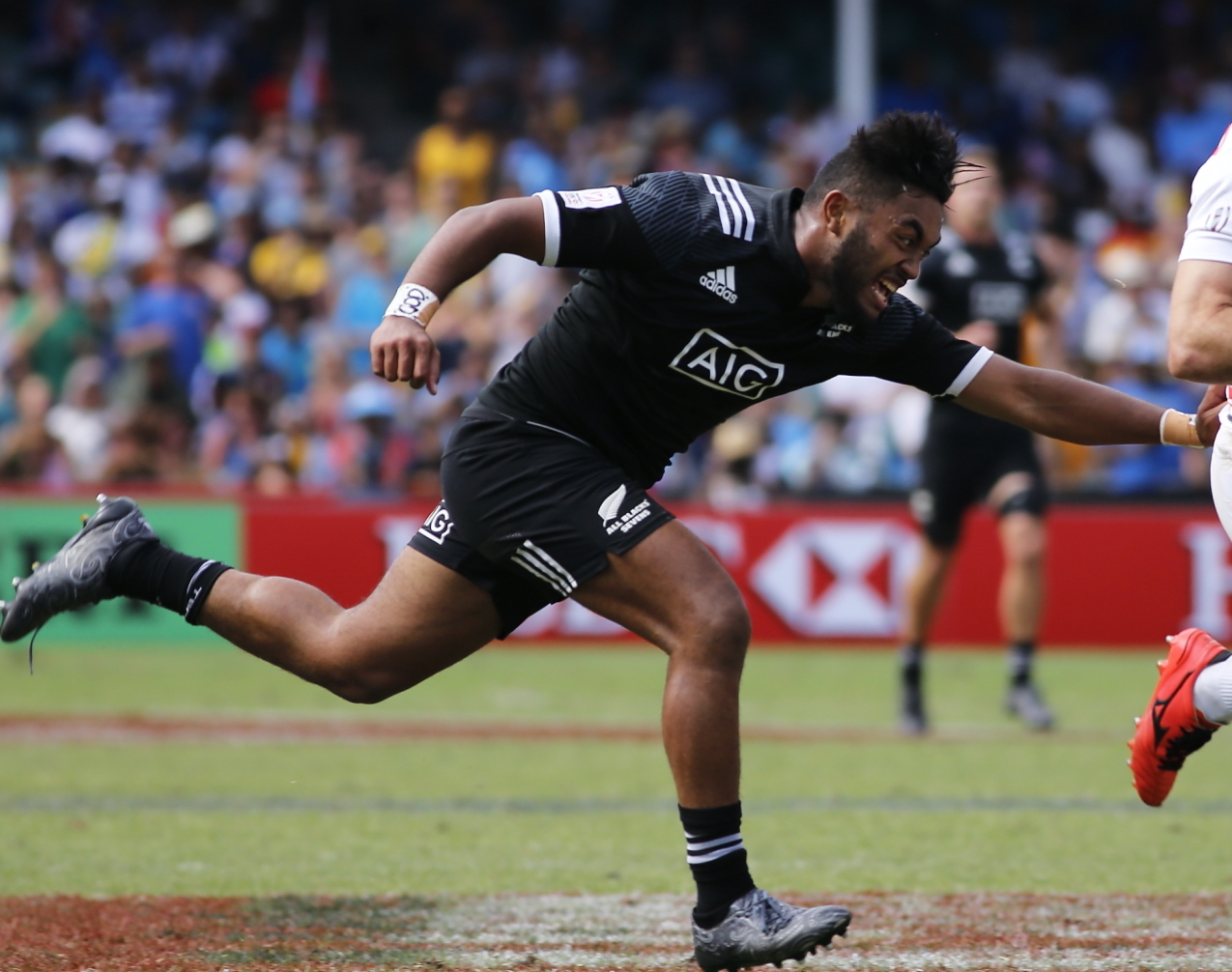
- Koroi representing New Zealand against England, February 2017
- Born: 17 April 1998 (age 28) Wanganui, New Zealand
- Height: 180 cm (5 ft 11 in)
- Weight: 81 kg (179 lb; 12 st 11 lb)
- School: Feilding High School

Rugby union career
- Position(s): Fullback, Wing, First five-eighth
- Current team: Otago, Highlanders
Senior career
Years	Team	Apps	(Points)
2017–	Otago	59	(154)
2020–	Highlanders	4	(2)
- Correct as of 22 October 2022
International career
Years	Team	Apps	(Points)
2018	New Zealand U20	5	(5)
- Correct as of 22 October 2022
National sevens team
Years	Team		Comps
2017–2020	New Zealand		23
- Correct as of 22 October 2022
Medal record
Men's rugby sevens
Representing New Zealand
Commonwealth Games
Gold medal – first place	2018 Gold Coast	Team competition

Vilimoni Koroi (born 17 April 1998) is a New Zealand rugby union player. Koroi was born to Fijian parents Taniela and Seruwaia in Whanganui and was a student at Feilding High School. Koroi played his first match for the New Zealand national rugby sevens team at the 2017 Wellington Sevens.
