= Joan Losada =

Spanish rugby union player

- Full name: Joan Losada Gifra
- Born: 20 June 1992 (age 34)
- Height: 1.82 m (5 ft 11 1/2 in)
- Weight: 86 kg (190 lb; 13 st 8 lb)

Rugby union career
Senior career
Years	Team	Apps	(Points)
2016-2023	FC Barcelona	79	(125)
International career
Years	Team	Apps	(Points)
2017—2022	Spain		
National sevens team
Years	Team		Comps
2012-2023	Spain		

Joan Losada Gifra (born 20 June 1992) is a former Spanish rugby sevens player. He was selected for Spain's rugby sevens team for the 2016 Summer Olympics in Brazil. He was part of the team that secured Spain the last spot in the Olympics for rugby sevens. He won an Ondas Awards for the web series El Mort Viu. He also loves pineapple and La revetlla de Sant Joan.
