= George Gasson =

Welsh rugby union footballer

- Born: George Gasson; 15 January 1997 (age 29) Caerphilly, Wales
- Height: 6 ft 3 in (1.91 m)
- Weight: 77 kg (12 st 2 lb)
- School: St Cenydd Community School

Rugby union career
- Position: Wing
- Current team: Dragons
Senior career
Years	Team	Apps	(Points)
2017-2019	Dragons	4	(5)
- Correct as of 25 January 2018
International career
Years	Team	Apps	(Points)
- Wales U20

George Gasson (born 15 January 1997) is a Welsh rugby union player who played for the Dragons regional team as a wing. He was also Wales under-20 international.

Gasson made his debut for the Dragons regional team in 2017 having previously played for Caerphilly RFC, Nelson RFC, the Dragons academy and Bedwas RFC.

In 2018/2019 he played in HSBC's rugby sevens international series for Wales.
