= John O'Donnell (rugby, born 1993) =

Irish rugby union and rugby league footballer

John O'Donnell (born 24 June 1993) is a rugby player who plays for the Ireland national rugby sevens team. He played at representative for Ireland at the 2018 London Sevens where the team finished in third place. He represented Ireland at the 2018 Rugby World Cup Sevens where Ireland finished ninth.

O'Donnell previously played rugby league, as well as playing rugby union for the Sale Sharks, before joining the Lansdowne rugby club in Dublin and playing for the Ireland sevens team.
