= Rhys Davies (rugby union, born February 1998) =

Welsh rugby union player

- Born: Rhys Davies; 8 February 1998 (age 28) Cardiff, Wales
- Height: 178 cm (5 ft 10 in)
- Weight: 83 kg (13 st 1 lb)

Rugby union career
- Current team: Cardiff Blues
Senior career
Years	Team	Apps	(Points)
2019–	Cardiff Blues	0	(0)
- Correct as of 10:10, 15 March 2020 (UTC)
National sevens team
Years	Team		Comps
	Wales Sevens		1

Rhys Davies (born 8 February 1998) is a Welsh rugby union player who plays for Cardiff Blues as a fly-half. He is a Wales Sevens international.

Davies has yet to debut for the Cardiff Blues regional team but has previously played for the Blues academy.
