= Patrick Kay (rugby union) =

Canadian rugby player

Personal information
- Born: September 19, 1993 (age 32) Duncan, British Columbia, Canada
- Height: 183 cm (6 ft 0 in)
- Weight: 92 kg (203 lb)
Medal record
Men's Rugby sevens
Representing Canada
Pan American Games
Silver medal – second place	2019 Lima	Team

Patrick Kay (born September 19, 1993) is a Canadian rugby union player, in the sevens discipline.

== Career ==
Kay was part of Canada's 2018 Commonwealth Games, with the team getting knocked out in the group stage.

Kay won silver as part of Canada's team at the 2019 Pan American Games in Lima.

In June 2021, Kay was named to Canada's 2020 Olympic team.
