= Regan Ware =

New Zealand rugby sevens player

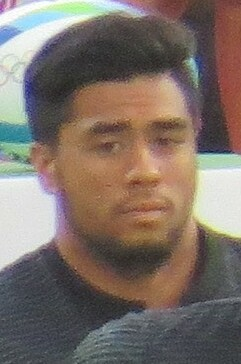
- Ware representing New Zealand during the 2016 Summer Olympics
- Full name: Regan Edward Ware
- Born: 7 August 1994 (age 32) Tokoroa, New Zealand
- Height: 1.88 m (6 ft 2 in)
- Weight: 89 kg (196 lb)
- School: Hamilton Boys' High School

Rugby union career
- Position(s): Wing, Centre
Senior career
Years	Team	Apps	(Points)
2014–2015	Waikato	11	(0)
2016	Bay of Plenty	10	(5)
2018	Taranaki	8	(10)
2020	Bay of Plenty	9	(5)
2021	Tasman	5	(10)
2025–	Hyderabad Heroes		
- Correct as of 4 August 2024
International career
Years	Team	Apps	(Points)
2015–	New Zealand 7s	303	(692)
2018	Māori All Blacks	1	(5)
- Correct as of 4 August 2024
Medal record
Men's rugby sevens
Representing New Zealand
Summer Olympics
Silver medal – second place	2020 Tokyo	Team competition
Commonwealth Games
Bronze medal – third place	2022 Birmingham	Team competition
Gold medal – first place	2018 Gold Coast	Team competition
Rugby World Cup Sevens
Silver medal – second place	2022 Cape Town	Team competition

Regan Edward Ware (born 7 August 1994) is a New Zealand professional rugby union player who plays as a back for the New Zealand national sevens team.

== Club career ==
Ware was named as a late signing for Tasman during the 2021 Bunnings NPC after a season ending injury to Mark Tele'a. He made his debut for Tasman in Round 5 of the competition against Southland at Lansdowne Park, coming off the bench and scoring a try in a 51–14 win for the Mako. The side went on to make the final before losing 23–20 to Waikato.

== International career ==
He debuted for New Zealand at the 2015 Dubai Sevens tournament. Ware was selected for the New Zealand squad for the 2016 Summer Olympics in Rio de Janeiro, Brazil. Of Māori descent, Ware affiliates to the Ngāti Korokī Kahukura and Ngāti Porou iwi.

Ware was part of the All Blacks Sevens squad that won a bronze medal at the 2022 Commonwealth Games in Birmingham. He competed at the Rugby World Cup Sevens in Cape Town. He won a silver medal after his side lost to Fiji in the gold medal final.

In 2024, He was named in the New Zealand sevens squad for the Paris Olympics. He played in the matches against Japan and South Africa before sustaining an injury, he was replaced by Joe Webber.
