= Taichi Yoshizawa =

Japanese rugby union player (born 1991)

- Born: 18 July 1991 (age 35)
- Height: 175 cm (5 ft 9 in)
- Weight: 80 kg (176 lb; 12 st 8 lb)

Rugby union career
- Position(s): Fullback, Wing
- Current team: NTT DoCoMo Red Hurricanes
Senior career
Years	Team	Apps	(Points)
2011–2021	Coca-Cola Red Sparks	36	(80)
2021–	NTT DoCoMo Red Hurricanes	36	(75)
National sevens team
Years	Team		Comps
2017–	Japan 7s		24

Taichi Yoshizawa (born 18 July 1991) is a Japanese rugby sevens player.

== Rugby career ==
Yoshizawa represented Japan at the 2018 Rugby World Cup Sevens in San Francisco where they finished 15th.

In 2023, He won a bronze medal at the delayed 2022 Asian Games in Hangzhou, China.

Yoshizawa competed for Japan at the 2024 Summer Olympics in Paris. He was originally listed as a traveling reserve but played against Samoa and Uruguay.
