= Alvin Otieno =

Kenyan rugby sevens player

- Born: Alvin Otieno; 19 April 1994 (age 32)
- Height: 183 cm (6 ft 0 in)
- Weight: 94 kg (207 lb)
- School: Kakamega High School, Lubinu boys

Rugby union career
- Position: Forward
National sevens team
Years	Team	Comps
2016–present	Kenya 7s	

Alvin Otieno (born 19 April 1994) is a Kenyan rugby sevens player who represents Kenya internationally. He made his Olympic debut representing Kenya at the 2020 Summer Olympics.

He was named in the Kenyan squad for the men's rugby sevens tournament at the 2020 Summer Olympics.

Commonly known in the HSBC rugby Sevens series as the Water Buffalo, Otieno dazzles rugby fans with his powerful runs and commanding physique on the pitch.

He has quick feet, is a quick sprinter, and plays with flair. Additionally, he has a striking hairstyle at the back of his head that enhances his allure.
