= Napolioni Bolaca =

Fijian rugby sevens player

- Full name: Napolioni Ratu Bolaca
- Born: 20 November 1996 (age 29) Lautoka, Fiji
- Height: 178 cm (5 ft 10 in)
- Weight: 90 kg (198 lb; 14 st 2 lb)
- School: Andhra Sangam College
- Notable relative: Laisana Likuceva (wife)

Rugby union career
- Position: Fly-half
- Current team: Fijian Drua
Senior career
Years	Team	Apps	(Points)
2022	Fijian Drua		
- Correct as of 27 September 2023
National sevens team
Years	Team		Comps
2019–	Fiji		9
- Correct as of 10 February 2022
Medal record
Men's rugby sevens
Representing Fiji
Summer Olympics
Gold medal – first place	2020 Tokyo	Team competition

Napolioni Ratu Bolaca (born 20 November 1996) is a Fijian rugby sevens and rugby union player, who has played for the Fiji national rugby sevens team since 2019. At club level, he has played for Fijian Drua. Bolaca was the top point scorer in the 2019–20 World Rugby Sevens Series. He was part of the Fijian squad that won the rugby seven tournament at the delayed 2020 Summer Olympics.

== Club career ==
At club level, Bolaca has played for Yasawa in the rugby union Skipper Cup, and in rugby sevens competitions. He has also played for Barbarians in the Fijian Super 7s Series. He missed part of the 2020 Skipper Cup due to an injury. Whilst playing rugby in Wadigi, Bolaca was spotted by a journalist who recommended him to Fijian head coach Gareth Baber.

In September 2021, Bolaca signed for Fijian Drua ahead of the 2022 Super Rugby Pacific season. He was recognised as one of Drua's first ever signings. In April 2022, he was critical of a lack of game time for Drua, and in May 2022, his contract with Fijian Drua was terminated.

== International career ==
Bolaca made his debut for Fiji national rugby sevens team in the 2019 Singapore Sevens event of the 2018–19 World Rugby Sevens Series. He scored two tries and five conversions in the final of the 2019 Paris Sevens event, as Fiji won the World Sevens Series. He played for Fiji in the rugby sevens event at the 2019 Pacific Games in Samoa.

Bolaca was the top points scorer in the 2019–20 World Rugby Sevens Series, with 159 points. He scored two tries in the final of the 2020 Sydney Sevens, as Fiji beat South Africa. At the 2020 USA Sevens event in Los Angeles, Bolaca won the Impact Player Award. The first day of the 2020 Canada Sevens in Vancouver was nicknamed the "Bolaca Show", after he scored three tries, including a breakaway try in the match against France. He was awarded the Pressure Play Award for best try in the Sevens Series, for one of his tries in the Sydney Sevens final. He was also named in the Sevens Series Dream Team. Fiji head coach Gareth Baber said that Bolaca was the team's best player in the 2018–19 and 2019–20 World Rugby Sevens Series, and has called Bolaca "the future of sevens rugby".

Bolaca was selected in the Fijian squad for the 2021 Oceania Sevens Championship, a warm-up tournament prior to the 2020 Summer Olympics. In July 2021, he was named in the Fijian squad for the rugby seven tournament at the Olympics. He started the final against New Zealand, which Fiji won 27–12. Bolaca was a nominee for the 2021 World Rugby Men's Sevens Player of the Year, which was won by Marcos Moneta.

Following the 2022 Super Rugby Pacific season, Bolaca returned to sevens training with Fiji. He was in the Fijian squad for the 2022 France Sevens and 2022 London Sevens events. Bolaca missed the 2022 Oceania Sevens Championship due to an injury.

== Personal life ==
Bolaca is from Lauwaki, Fiji. He has four older siblings, and his father has worked as a coach of the Lauwaki rugby team. Bolaca is married to women's rugby sevens player Laisana Likuceva, and in February 2023, they had a child. In 2024, the pair became the first couple to compete at the same event during the 2024 Canada Sevens tournament.
