= Ollie Lindsay-Hague =

English rugby union player

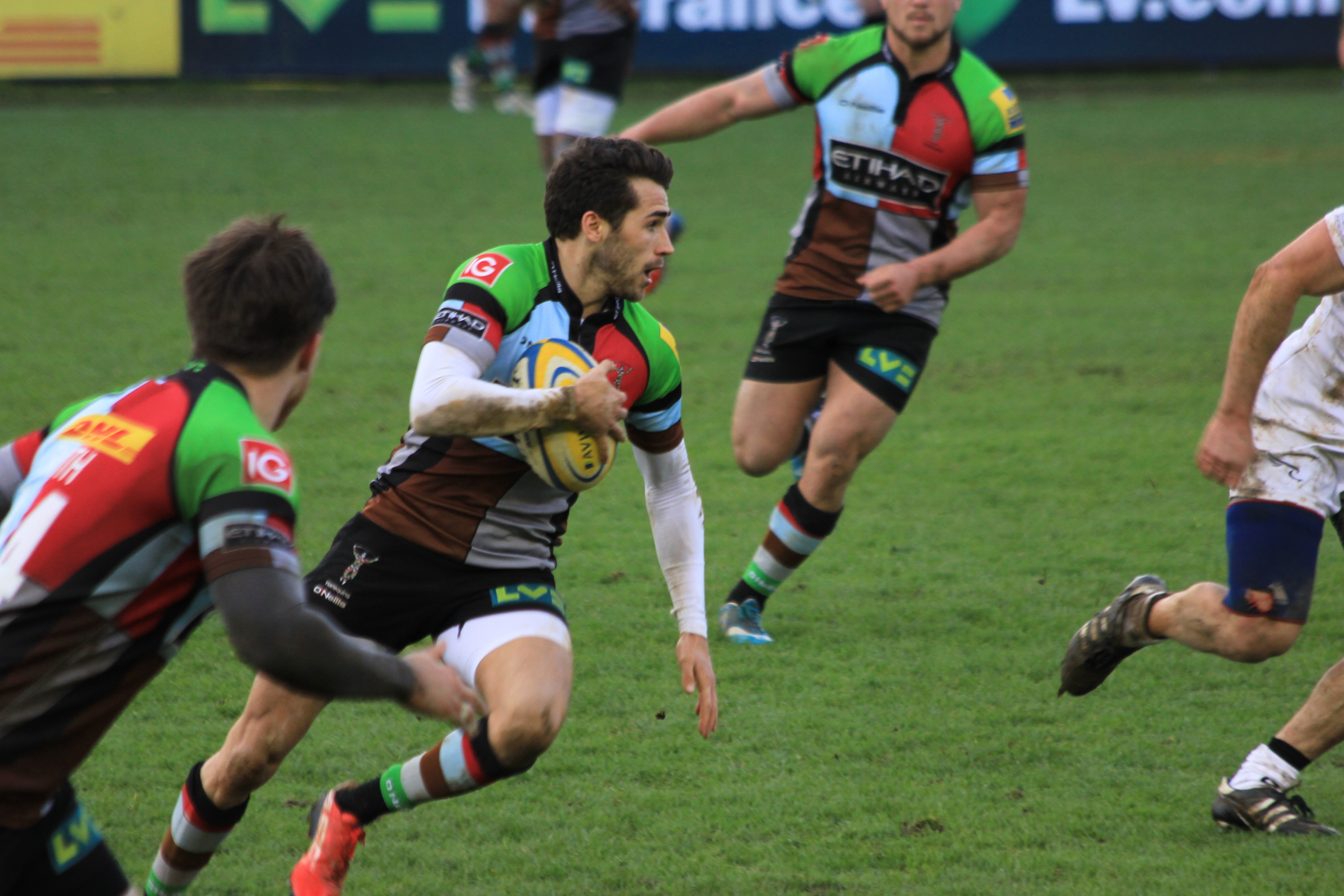
- Born: 8 October 1990 (age 36) London, England
- Height: 5 ft 11 in (1.80 m)
- Weight: 180 lb (82 kg)

Rugby union career
- Position(s): Fullback, Wing
Senior career
Years	Team	Apps	(Points)
2011–2016	Harlequin F.C.	58	(50)
2021-	Newcastle Falcons	0	(0)
National sevens teams
Years	Team		Comps
2016	Great Britain		
2016-	England 7s		
Medal record
Men's rugby sevens
Representing Great Britain
Olympic Games
Silver medal – second place	2016 Rio de Janeiro	Team competition

Ollie Lindsay-Hague (born 8 October 1990) is an English professional rugby union player, who played for Harlequin F.C.

Lindsay-Hague is a versatile member of the squad having played wing, fullback and also scrum-half for the club.

He was educated at Hall School Wimbledon and Millfield School where he was Sevens captain. He first played pro rugby at London Welsh, while also representing the England Under 16 A team as well as playing for England in 7s.

Lindsay-Hague was selected to represent Great Britain at the 2016 Summer Olympics in Rugby sevens. It was announced in August 2016 that he was leaving Harlequins.

In August 2021, it was announced that Lindsay-Hague would join Newcastle Falcons and return to the 15-a-side format. He left Newcastle Falcons in 2022.
