= Chris Dry =

South African rugby union player (born 1988)

- Full name: Christopher Adriaan Dry
- Born: 13 February 1988 (age 38) Cape Town, South Africa
- Height: 1.91 m (6 ft 3 in)
- Weight: 98 kg (216 lb)
- School: Grey College, Bloemfontein
- University: Central University of Technology

Rugby union career
- Position: Flanker
- Current team: South Africa Sevens
Youth career
- 2006–2009: Free State Cheetahs
Amateur team(s)
Years	Team	Apps	(Points)
2010	UFS Shimlas	1	(0)
Senior career
Years	Team	Apps	(Points)
2009–2010	Free State Cheetahs	5	(0)
2017	Cheetahs	3	(0)
2017	Free State Cheetahs	7	(5)
- Correct as of 12 February 2020
International career
Years	Team	Apps	(Points)
2011–present	South Africa Sevens	342	(465)
- Correct as of 22 April 2018
Medal record
Men's rugby sevens
Representing South Africa
Commonwealth Games
Gold medal – first place	2014 Glasgow	Team competition

Christopher Adriaan Dry (born 13 February 1988) is a South African professional rugby union player, currently playing with the South African Sevens team in the Sevens World Series. His regular position is a flanker.

== Youth rugby ==
Dry played rugby for his school, Grey College in Bloemfontein, earning a call-up to Free State's Under-18 side that played at the Academy Week tournament in 2006. The following year, he became involved in the youth structures at the Free State Cheetahs; he played for the Free State U19 side in the 2007 Under-19 Provincial Championship and for the Free State U21 side in the Under-21 Provincial Championships in both 2008 and 2009.

== Professional ==
Dry made his first class debut for the Free State Cheetahs during the 2009 Currie Cup Premier Division, coming on as a late substitute in their 59–8 victory against Boland Cavaliers in Bloemfontein. That turned out be his only appearance in the Currie Cup, despite being named on the bench for their matches against the Golden Lions and Western Province.

Dry made a single appearance for university side UFS Shimlas during the 2010 Varsity Cup competition, a 37–31 win over TUT Vikings before joining the Free State Cheetahs' squad for the 2010 Vodacom Cup. After an appearance off the bench in their match against Argentine invitational side Pampas XV, he started his first ever first class match against Western Province the following week and also started their next two matches against the Golden Lions and Boland Cavaliers.

== South Africa Sevens ==
In 2010, Dry joined the South African Sevens setup. He made his debut at the 2010 Adelaide Sevens tournament and participated in four tournaments in the 2009–10 IRB Sevens World Series and quickly established himself as a regular in the side.

Dry made six tournament appearances in the 2010–11 IRB Sevens World Series and played in all nine events of the 2011–12 IRB Sevens World Series. He played in the first eight events during the 2012–13 IRB Sevens World Series but missed out on the 2013 London Sevens. He was also a member of the Blitzbokke that played at the 2013 Rugby World Cup Sevens, but disappointingly got knocked out at the quarter-final stage by Fiji.

Dry once again played in all nine events of the 2013–14 IRB Sevens World Series before participating at the 2014 Commonwealth Games in Glasgow, helping his side all the way to the final, where they got a 17–12 victory over a New Zealand that won the previous four tournaments.
