= Joe Webber =

NZ rugby union player (born 1993)

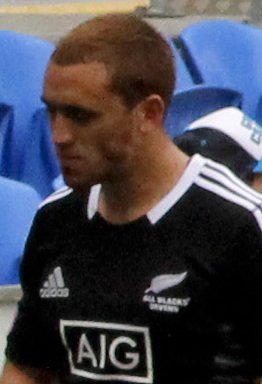
- Webber representing New Zealand during the Gold Coast Sevens
- Full name: Tevarn Joseph Webber
- Born: 27 August 1993 (age 33) Tokoroa, New Zealand
- Height: 1.86 m (6 ft 1 in)
- Weight: 90 kg (198 lb)
- School: Hamilton Boys' High School

Rugby union career
- Position(s): Wing, Fullback
Senior career
Years	Team	Apps	(Points)
2012–2015	Waikato	23	(50)
2017–2021	Bay of Plenty	29	(95)
- Correct as of 21 July 2024
International career
Years	Team	Apps	(Points)
2011–	New Zealand 7s	281	(646)
2013	New Zealand U20	4	(5)
2014	Māori All Blacks	1	(0)
2017	New Zealand Barbarians	1	(0)
- Correct as of 21 July 2024
Medal record
Men's rugby sevens
Representing New Zealand
Olympic Games
Silver medal – second place	2020 Tokyo	Team competition
Commonwealth Games
Bronze medal – third place	2022 Birmingham	Team competition
Silver medal – second place	2014 Glasgow	Team competition

Tevarn Joseph Webber (born 27 August 1993) is a New Zealand professional rugby union player who plays as a back for the New Zealand national sevens team.

== International career ==
He was a member of the New Zealand under-20 squad in 2013. Webber was named in the sevens squad to the 2014 Commonwealth Games.

Webber was part of the All Blacks Sevens squad that won a bronze medal at the 2022 Commonwealth Games in Birmingham.

Webber competed for New Zealand at the 2024 Summer Olympics in Paris. He was initially named as a traveling reserve but was called into the squad after Regan Ware sustained an injury.

== Personal life ==
Of Māori descent, Webber affiliates to the Ngāti Ranginui and Waikato iwi. His sister Jordon Webber is a member of the New Zealand women's sevens team.
