= Marvin O'Connor =

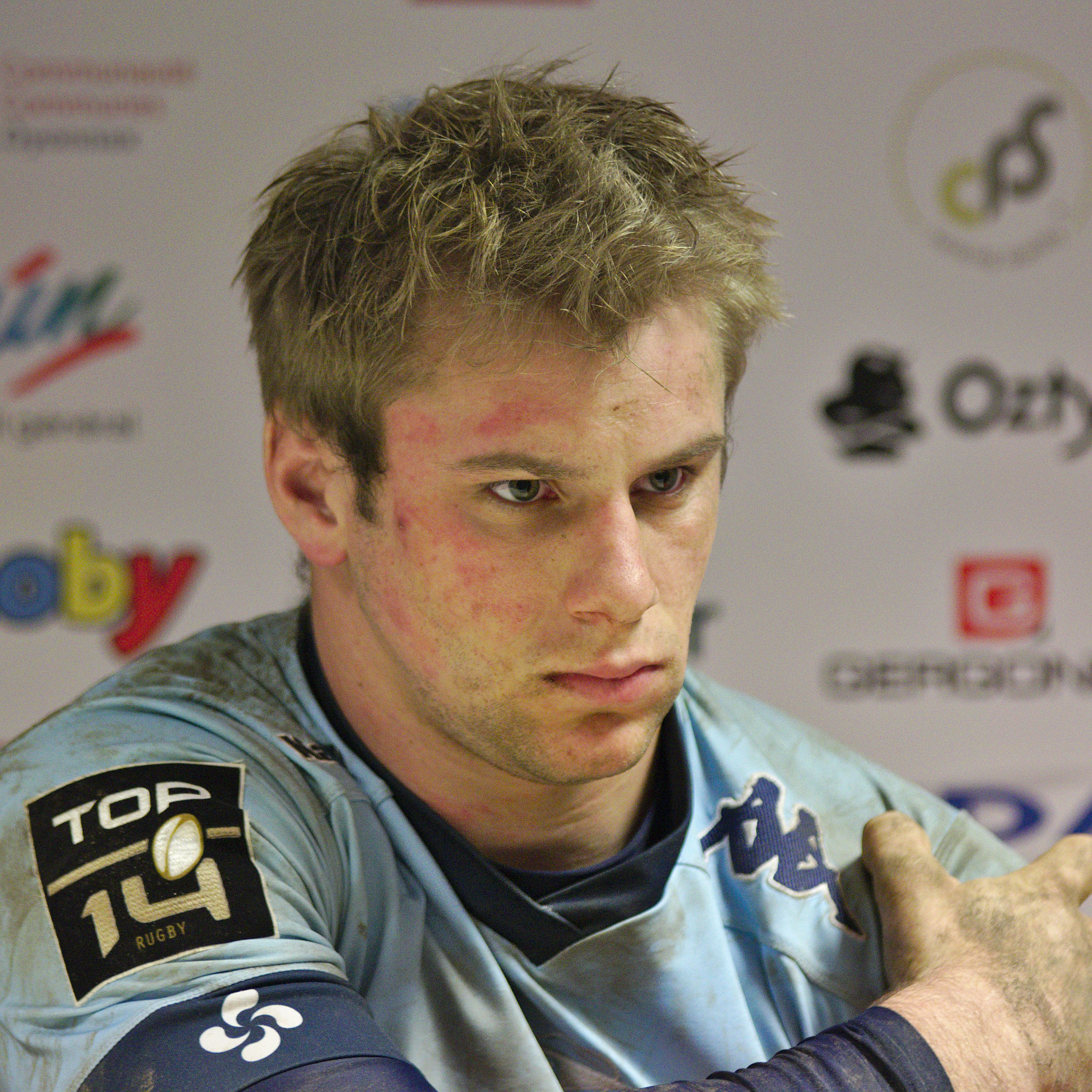
- Born: 18 April 1991 (age 35) Annemasse, France
- Height: 1.75 m (5 ft 9 in)
- Weight: 88 kg (13 st 12 lb)

Rugby union career
- Position: Wing
Senior career
Years	Team	Apps	(Points)
2009–2011	Grenoble	19	(10)
2011–2015	Bayonne	89	(105)
2015	Montpellier	26	(60)
- Correct as of 24 May 2016

Marvin O'Connor (born 18 April 1991) is a French rugby union player of Australian descent. Originally a half-back, his currently plays on the wing for the French Top 14 club Stade Francais.

O'Connor started playing at the age of 5 with Annemasse rugby club (Haute Savoie) before moving to Grenoble at the age of 16. He made his first appearance with the senior professional team FC Grenoble in the Pro D2 in 2010 when still only 18 before moving to Bayonne in 2011.

== Honours ==
- 2015–16 European Rugby Challenge Cup : winner (Montpellier).
