= Jean-Pascal Barraque =

French rugby union player (born 1991)

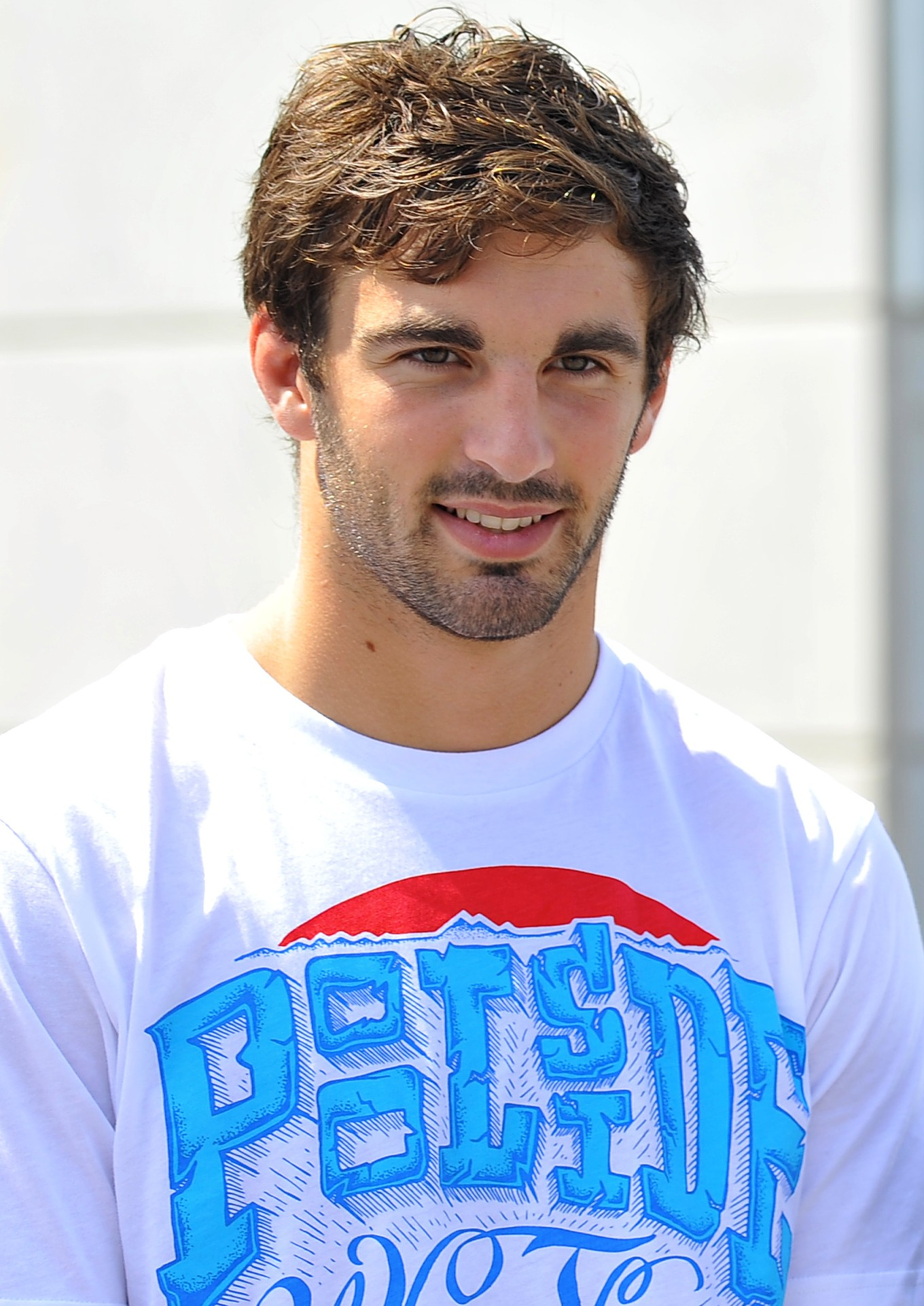
- Barraque in 2013
- Full name: Jean-Pascal André Martin Barraque
- Born: 24 April 1991 (age 35) Le Chesnay, France
- Height: 1.82 m (6 ft 0 in)
- Weight: 80 kg (176 lb)

Rugby union career
- Position(s): Fly-half, Centre, Fullback
- Current team: Clermont
Senior career
| Years | Team | Apps | (Points) |
| 2010–2013 | Biarritz | 55 | (124) |
| 2013–2014 | Toulouse | 9 | (32) |
| 2014–2016 | La Rochelle | 38 | (106) |
| 2017–2018 | Bordeaux Bègles | 7 | (15) |
| 2020– | Clermont | 41 | (61) |
International career
| Years | Team | Apps | (Points) |
| 2011 | France U20 | 10 | (54) |
| 2020– | France | 1 | (0) |
- Correct as of 28 Nov 2020
National sevens team
| Years | Team | | Comps |
| 2012– | France 7s | | 202 (95t) |
Medal record
Men's rugby sevens
Representing France
Olympic Games
| Gold medal – first place | 2024 Paris | Team competition |

Jean-Pascal André Martin Barraque (born 24 April 1991) is a French rugby union player. He plays for Clermont. He is a utility back. His usual position is fly-half, although he can play as a centre or fullback. He competed for France at the 2022 Rugby World Cup Sevens in Cape Town.

He was part of the French sevens side that won the gold medal at the 2024 Summer Olympics in Paris.
