= Yoshikazu Fujita =

Japan international rugby union player

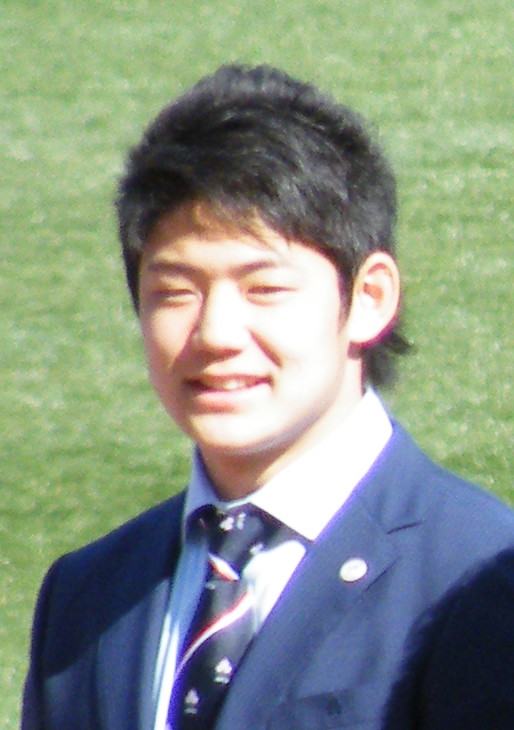
- Fujita in 2013
- Born: 8 September 1993 (age 33) Fukuoka, Japan
- Height: 1.84 m (6 ft 0 in)
- Weight: 90 kg (14 st 2 lb; 198 lb)
- University: Waseda University

Rugby union career
- Position: Wing/Fullback
Amateur team(s)
| Years | Team | Apps | (Points) |
- St. Bede's College
- Waseda University
Senior career
| Years | Team | Apps | (Points) |
| 2016–2022 | Panasonic Wild Knights | 28 | (61) |
| 2018 | Sunwolves | 1 | (0) |
| 2022–2025 | Honda Heat | 16 | (20) |
| 2025– | AZ-COM Maruwa MOMOTARO’S | 6 | (15) |
- Correct as of 21 February 2021
International career
| Years | Team | Apps | (Points) |
| 2012–2017 | Japan | 31 | (130) |
- Correct as of 21 February 2021
National sevens team
| Years | Team | | Comps |
| 2011– | Japan Sevens | | 28 |
- Correct as of 21 February 2021

Yoshikazu Fujita (藤田 慶和, born 8 September 1993 in Kyoto) is a Japanese international rugby union player.

After impressing the coaches with his form playing for the Japan sevens team, Fujita was selected for the Japan national rugby union team and became the youngest ever player to play for Japan when he took the field against the UAE in May 2012 at the age of 18 years and 210 days in his hometown of Fukuoka. On his debut as Japan youngest ever player he scored 6 tries. However soon after his debut later that month he suffered a serious injury where he tore the ligaments in his left knee and was ruled out of action for 10 months.

He returned to play in the Pacific Rugby Cup for Junior Japan in March 2013, and then returned to the Japan national team after an injury to Hirotoki Onozawa and scored tries on his return in all three of the matches he played in the Asian 5 Nations. After scoring his 11th try for Japan against Wales in June 2013, Fujita broke the record of George North for most tries scored as a teenager in international rugby.
