= Aaron O'Sullivan =

Irish rugby union player

- Born: 15 December 1999 (age 26) Basingstoke, England
- Height: 1.88 m (6 ft 2 in)
- Weight: 98 kg (15.4 st; 216 lb)
- School: Henley college
- University: UCD

Rugby union career
- Position: Wing or full back
Senior career
| Years | Team | Apps | (Points) |
| 2017 | Wasps | 2 | (5) |
| 2018– | Leinster | 0 | (0) |
- Correct as of 15 March 2020
International career
| Years | Team | Apps | (Points) |
| 2020– | Ireland Sevens | 69 | (85) |
- Correct as of 15 March 2020

Aaron O'Sullivan (born 15 December 1999) is an Irish rugby union player, currently playing for Pro14 and European Rugby Champions Cup side Leinster. His preferred position is wing.

== Rugby union ==
O'Sullivan previously played association football, represented the academies of both Southampton and Reading. After committing to rugby, O'Sullivan played for Wasps in the Anglo-Welsh cup. He then committed to the Leinster academy, and has yet to debut for Leinster. He has represented the Ireland national rugby sevens team.
