= Sam Pecqueur =

Scottish rugby player (born 1994)

- Born: 26 August 1994 (age 32) Edinburgh, Scotland
- Height: 1m 84cm
- Weight: 92 kg (203 lb)

Rugby union career
- Position: Wing
Senior career
Years	Team	Apps	(Points)
2019–	Edinburgh	0	(0)
- Correct as of 12 September 2019
Super Rugby
Years	Team	Apps	(Points)
2021-22	Southern Knights		
2022-	Heriots		
International career
Years	Team	Apps	(Points)
2017–	Scotland 7s	49	(70)
- Correct as of 12 September 2019

Sam Pecqueur (born 26 August 1994) is a Scotland 7s international rugby union player. He plays for Edinburgh in the United Rugby Championship and Heriots in the Super 6. Pecqueur's primary position is wing.

== Rugby Union career ==
=== Professional career ===
Pecqueur signed for Edinburgh in the summer of 2019.

He signed for Southern Knights in 2021.

He switched to play for Heriots in 2022.

=== International career ===
Pecqueur played his first match for the Scotland national rugby sevens team in the 2017 South Africa Sevens tournament.
