= Ruhan Nel =

South African rugby union player

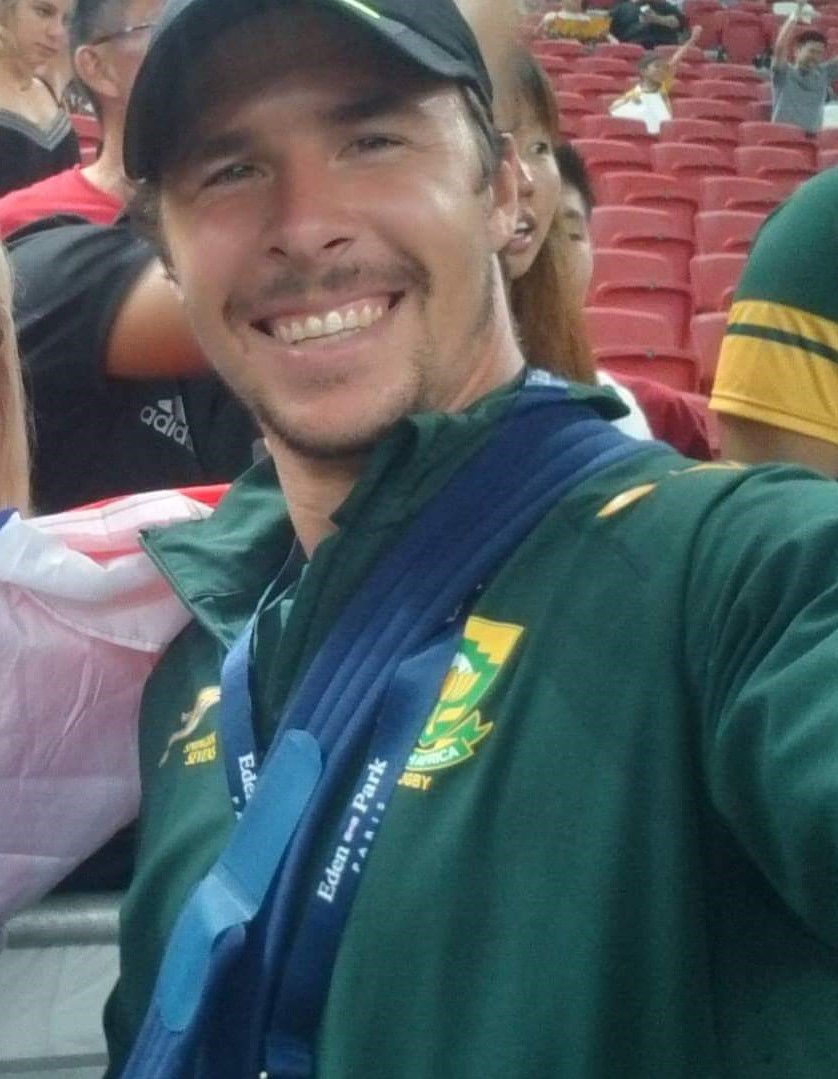
- Full name: Adriaan Ruhan Nel
- Born: 17 May 1991 (age 35) Port Elizabeth, South Africa
- Height: 1.91 m (6 ft 3 in)
- Weight: 101 kg (15 st 13 lb; 223 lb)
- School: Hoërskool Brandwag, Benoni
- Notable relative: Jacques Nel (brother)

Rugby union career
- Position: Full-back / Winger / Centre
- Current team: Stormers / Western Province
Youth career
- 2010: Pumas
- 2012: Golden Lions
Amateur team(s)
Years	Team	Apps	(Points)
2014	Wits	7	(10)
Senior career
Years	Team	Apps	(Points)
2012–2014	Golden Lions XV	7	(20)
2013	Golden Lions	3	(5)
2015	Griquas	9	(30)
2017–present	Western Province	36	(35)
2019–present	Stormers	69	(75)
- Correct as of 23 July 2022
International career
Years	Team	Apps	(Points)
2014–2018	South Africa Sevens	147	(247)
- Correct as of 14 November 2018

Adriaan Ruhan Nel (born 17 May 1991) is a South African rugby union player for the Stormers in United Rugby Championship and European Rugby Champions Cup and Western Province in the Currie Cup and in the Rugby Challenge. His regular position is full-back, winger and centre.

== Youth rugby ==
Nel played for the Pumas U19 side in the 2010 Under-19 Provincial Championship competition and for UP Tuks in club rugby.

=== Club rugby ===
Nel signed for Johannesburg-based side the Golden Lions for 2012 and made his first class debut for them in the 2012 Vodacom Cup match against local rivals the Blue Bulls. He played for the Golden Lions U21 side during the 2012 Under-21 Provincial Championship and made another three senior appearances in the 2013 Vodacom Cup. His Currie Cup debut for the Lions came during the 2013 season, when he came on as a substitute in the 54th minute against the Free State Cheetahs – and scored a try within five minutes of coming on. He represented Griquas in the 2015 Currie Cup Premier Division.

== International ==
Nel was included in the South African Sevens team for the 2014 Gold Coast Sevens leg of the 2014–15 IRB Sevens World Series.

== Personal life ==
Nel is the older brother of winger Jacques Nel.
