= Paulin Riva =

French rugby union player (born 1994

- Born: 20 April 1994 (age 32) Auch, France
- Height: 1.86 m (6 ft 1 in)
- Weight: 92 kg (203 lb)

Rugby union career
- Position: Centre
Senior career
Years	Team	Apps	(Points)
2013-2014	Rugby Club Auch		
2014-2016	Union Bordeaux Bègles		
2016-2021	Soyaux Angoulême		
National sevens team
Years	Team		Comps
2017-	France 7s		
Medal record
Men's rugby sevens
Representing France
Olympic Games
Gold medal – first place	2024 Paris	Team competition

Paulin Riva (born 20 April 1994) is a French rugby union player. He is captain of the France national rugby sevens team.

== Early life ==
From Auch, he started playing rugby union at the age of five with FC Auch. He joined the Pôle France and played a number of matches with France national under-20 rugby union team.

== Career ==
He played professional club rugby for Union Bordeaux Bègles. He later also played on loan for Soyaux-Angouleme. In 2017, he began playing for the France national rugby sevens team, making his debut on the world sevens circuit in Dubai.

He captained the French Rugby Sevens team to victory at the World Rugby SVNS Series event in Los Angeles in March 2024 and the 2024 Spain Sevens in Madrid in June 2024.

He was part of the Olympic Torch Relay in May 2024 in Gers in the region of Occitania. He was subsequently named as captain for the French Rugby Sevens team for the 2024 Paris Olympics.

In May 2025, he was named in the World Tour's Team of the Year following the conclusion of the 2024-25 SVNS.

Continuing with France for the 2025-26 SVNS, Riva captained France as they won the 2026 France Sevens in Bordeaux in June 2026, beating New Zealand 14-5 in the final.
