= Tomasi Alosio =

Samoan rugby union player

- Full name: Tomasi Alosio Logotuli
- Born: 26 January 1992 (age 34) Samoa
- Height: 185 cm (6 ft 1 in)
- Weight: 92 kg (203 lb; 14 st 7 lb)
- School: St. Patrick's College Silverstream

Rugby union career
- Position(s): Wing, Fullback
Senior career
Years	Team	Apps	(Points)
2015, 2021	Wellington	19	(20)
2022–2023	Moana Pasifika	3	(5)
2022–2023	Tasman	10	(5)
- Correct as of 7 October 2023
International career
Years	Team	Apps	(Points)
2021–2022	Samoa	7	(5)
- Correct as of 7 October 2023
National sevens team
Years	Team		Comps
2015–2020	Samoa Sevens		45
- Correct as of 2 September 2022

Tomasi Alosio Logotuli (born 26 January 1992) is a Samoan rugby union player. He plays on the wing or as fullback.

== Career ==
He was named in the Moana Pasifika squad for the 2022 Super Rugby Pacific season.

He also represented Wellington in the 2015 ITM Cup and the 2021 Bunnings NPC.

Alosio is a Samoa international having made his debut in 2021 against Tonga, having previously represented Samoa at rugby sevens, playing over 200 games between 2015 and 2020.

Alosio was named in the Tasman Mako squad for the 2022 Bunnings NPC.
