= Alasio Naduva =

Alasio Sovita Naduva
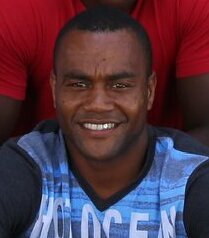
- Born: 25 June 1990 (age 36)
- Height: 1.68 m (5 ft 6 in)
- Weight: 78 kg (172 lb; 12 st 4 lb)
- Occupation: Rugby Sevens Player

Rugby union career
- Current team: Rugby Sevens Player
Senior career
Years	Team	Apps	(Points)
2023-Present	New York Locals	4	(43)
National sevens team
Years	Team		Comps
–	Fiji 7s		

Alasio Sovita Naduva MOF (born 25 June 1990) plays as a winger in the Fiji national rugby sevens team. He helped the Fiji Sevens side to win their fourth World Rugby Sevens Series in the 2018-19 season.

== Early life ==
Naduva is a native of Naweni in the Cakudrove Province in Fiji.

== Career ==
=== Fiji Sevens ===
Naduva made his debut in the 2017-18 HSBC World Sevens Series and has quickly established himself as one of the fastest players, hitting a top speed of 36 km per hour suggesting that he is one of the world's fastest rugby players.

=== Premier Rugby Sevens ===
Naduva signed into Premier Rugby Sevens for the 2023 season. He was drafted into the New York Locals expansion franchise. He would have standout performances for the Locals at the Eastern Conference Kickoff in Austin, TX at Q2 Stadium, as well as at the Eastern Conference finals in Pittsburgh, PA. He would be the league's leading try scorer, scoring 7 tries and 43 points in 4 games. The Locals were unable to qualify for the Championship weekend.

Naduva would take home league MVP honors for his efforts in the 2023 season.

== Awards and honours ==
- Player of the final Hamilton Sevens
- 2023 Premier Rugby Sevens Men's Most Valuable Player
