= Andrew Knewstubb =

New Zealand rugby sevens player

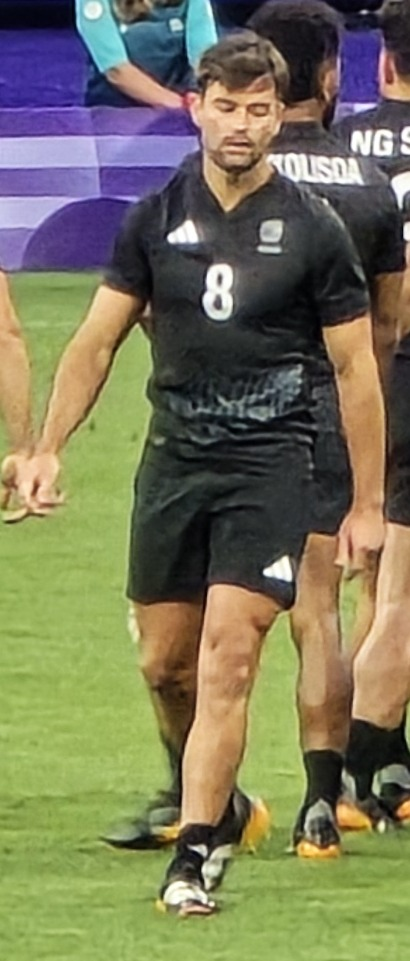
- Born: 14 September 1995 (age 31) Wellington, New Zealand
- Height: 1.88 m (6 ft 2 in)
- Weight: 88 kg (194 lb)
- School: Paraparaumu College

Rugby union career
- Position: Fullback
Senior career
Years	Team	Apps	(Points)
2020	Canterbury	6	(5)
2021	Tasman	4	(10)
2025	Canterbury	13	(9)
2026-	Highlanders	1	(0)
- Correct as of 4 August 2024
International career
Years	Team	Apps	(Points)
2017–	New Zealand 7s	173	(638)
- Correct as of 4 August 2024
Medal record
Men's rugby sevens
Representing New Zealand
Summer Olympics
Silver medal – second place	2020 Tokyo	Team competition
Commonwealth Games
Gold medal – first place	2018 Gold Coast	Team competition

Andrew Knewstubb (born 14 September 1995) is a New Zealand professional rugby union player who plays as a back for the New Zealand national sevens team.

== International career ==
He won gold medal with the New Zealand team in the men's rugby sevens tournament during the 2018 Commonwealth Games. He was also a key member of the New Zealand side which won the 2018 Rugby World Cup Sevens tournament by defeating England 33-12 in the final. He was named in the New Zealand squad to compete at the 2020 Summer Olympics in the men's rugby sevens tournament. He was also part of the New Zealand side which claimed silver medal after losing to Fiji 24-12 at the 2020 Summer Olympics. It was also New Zealand's first ever Olympic medal in the men's rugby sevens.

Knewstubb was named as a late signing for Tasman during the 2021 Bunnings NPC after a season-ending injury to Mark Tele'a. He made his debut for Tasman against Bay of Plenty at Trafalgar Park in a non competition match, starting in the number 15 jersey and scoring a try in a 26–9 win for the Mako. The side went on to make the premiership final before losing 23–20 to Waikato.

In 2024, He represented New Zealand at the Paris Olympics.
