= Joe Pincus =

Australian rugby sevens player

- Born: 24 July 1996 (age 30) Australia
- Height: 188 cm (6 ft 2 in)
- Weight: 90 kg (198 lb; 14 st 2 lb)
- Notable relative: Tom Pincus (brother)

Rugby union career
- Position: Wing / Fullback
- Current team: Rebels
Senior career
Years	Team	Apps	(Points)
2017	Eastern Suburbs	13	(32)
2020	Eastern Suburbs	2	(0)
2022–2024	Rebels	10	(5)
- Correct as of 3 June 2023
National sevens team
Years	Team		Comps
2018–	Australia		13
- Correct as of 3 August 2021

Joe Pincus (born 24 July 1996) is an Australian rugby sevens player. Pincus was a member of the Australian men's rugby seven's squad at the Tokyo 2020 Olympics. The team came third in their pool round and then lost to Fiji 19-nil in the quarterfinal.

== Super Rugby statistics ==
As of 3 June 2023

Season	Team	Games	Starts	Sub	Mins	Tries	Cons	Pens	Drops	Points	Yel	Red
2022	Rebels	0	0	0	0	0	0	0	0	0	0	0
2023	Rebels	10	4	6	435	1	0	0	0	5	0	0
Total		0	0	0	0	0	0	0	0	0	0	0
