= Gavin Lowe =

Scottish rugby union player

- Born: 1 March 1995 (age 31) Carluke, Scotland
- Height: 5 ft 11 in (1.80 m)
- Weight: 87 kg (13 st 10 lb)
- School: Auchinleck Academy

Rugby union career
- Position: Full Back
Amateur team(s)
Years	Team	Apps	(Points)
- Ayr RFC
- Glasgow Hawks
2017-	Marr		
Senior career
Years	Team	Apps	(Points)
2013-15	Glasgow Warriors	5	(15)
Super Rugby
Years	Team	Apps	(Points)
2021-	Ayrshire Bulls	3	(5)
International career
Years	Team	Apps	(Points)
- Scotland U18
2013–2014	Scotland U20	3	(12)
National sevens team
Years	Team		Comps
2014–	Scotland 7s		42 (590)

Gavin Lowe (born 1 March 1995 in Carluke) is a Scottish international 7s rugby union player at the Full Back position.

== Rugby union career ==
=== Amateur career ===
Lowe first played his rugby for Ayr Rugby but moved on to the Glasgow Hawks. He was confirmed as part of SportScotland's academy system in 2013.

Lowe has been drafted to Marr in the Scottish Premiership for the 2017-18 season.

=== Professional career ===
Lowe secured an Elite Development Programme position at the Glasgow Warriors in 2013 and in 2014. This meant he could continue playing for Glasgow Hawks whilst training and challenging for a place at the Warriors.

He played for Glasgow Warriors in their match against Aberdeen GSFP on 8 August 2013, scoring a try in the match.

After 2 seasons with the Warriors, he was released in 2015.

On 23 June 2021 it was announced that he had been signed by the Ayrshire Bulls to play in the Super 6.

=== International career ===
Lowe is now a regular in the Scotland 7s side.
