= Robbie Fergusson =

Scottish rugby union player (born 1993)

- Born: Robert Alexander James Fergusson; 30 August 1993 (age 33) Ayr, Scotland
- Height: 5 ft 11 in (1.80 m)
- Weight: 92 kg (14 st 7 lb)

Rugby union career
- Position: Centre
Amateur team(s)
Years	Team	Apps	(Points)
- Ayr
Senior career
Years	Team	Apps	(Points)
2015	Glasgow Warriors	2	(0)
2015–16	→ London Scottish	7	(0)
2016–17	London Scottish		
2020–21	Glasgow Warriors	9	(0)
International career
Years	Team	Apps	(Points)
- Scotland U17
- Scotland U18
2011–13	Scotland U20	13	(10)
2017–	Scotland 7s		
- Correct as of 20 August 2015
Medal record
Men's rugby sevens
Representing Great Britain
European Games
Silver medal – second place	2023 Kraków–Małopolska	Team competition

Robbie Fergusson (born 30 August 1993) is a Scottish rugby union player who plays international rugby for Great Britain 7s. He formerly played for Glasgow Warriors and London Scottish, and will re-join Glasgow Warriors in January 2022.

== Rugby Union career ==
=== Amateur career ===
Fergusson had been playing for amateur club Ayr RFC for a number of seasons, since joining the club's mini-rugby section; progressing through the ranks and making his first-team debut as a 17-year-old while still a pupil at Wellington School in his hometown.

His rugby development was curtailed on being diagnosed with cancer. After chemotherapy treatment for Hodgkin’s lymphoma, Fergusson returned to rugby in October 2014.

Fergusson was assigned Ayr in the Pro draft for the Scottish Premiership sides from Scotland 7s for the season 2017-18.

=== Professional career ===
Fergusson has represented Glasgow at under-16, under-17, and under-18.

Fergusson trained with Glasgow Warriors in the 2013–14 season. He played for the side in a pre-season game against Aberdeen GSFP.

Fergusson came off the bench in a Glasgow Warriors 'A' select versus Edinburgh Rugby 'A' select in December 2014.

Fergusson was named in the new Scottish Rugby Academy as a stage 3 player. He was part of the squad assigned to Glasgow and the West district and was aligned Glasgow Warriors for the 2015–16 season.

Fergusson was named in the Glasgow Warriors squad to take on the French side Clermont in a pre-season game in the 2015 Auvergne Challenge in Issoire. During the match, Fergusson came on as a substitute. He made his competitive début coming off the bench in Glasgow's opening game against the Scarlets in the 2015 Pro12. He earned the Glasgow Warrior No. 250.

In November 2015, he was loaned to London Scottish by Glasgow Warriors to gain more experience of playing professional rugby. On 7 April 2016, this deal was made permanent, and Fergusson officially signed for London Scottish.

In a COVID-19 hit season 2020-21, he was with the Glasgow Warriors squad. He played 10 times for the club in the Pro14 league, starting 9 matches. At the end of the season, Fergusson was thanked in a 'leavers video' by the club for his support to the squad over the season.

On 7 October 2021, it was announced that Fergusson had signed for the Warriors for a third spell with the club, to begin in January 2022 when his commitments end with the GB 7s team. Fergusson stated:

"I’m buzzing to have signed for the club. I came through the Glasgow academy, and it’s always been a lifelong rugby dream to sign for Glasgow. My family are here, and Glasgow has been my home club and the club I’ve supported since I was a boy, so it was a really easy decision for me when the offer of a contract came through."

=== International career ===
Fergusson has represented Scotland at under-17 level, under-18 level and under-20 level.

Fergusson is now in the Scotland 7s squad.
