= Tom Bowen (rugby union, born 1993) =

English rugby player

- Born: 31 January 1993 (age 33) Brighton, England
- Height: 1.75 m (5 ft 9 in)
- Weight: 82 kg (181 lb)

Rugby union career
Senior career
Years	Team	Apps	(Points)
2012-	Plymouth Albion R.F.C.		
2022-	Worthing RFC		
National sevens teams
Years	Team		Comps
2014–2022	England 7s		
2021	Great Britain 7s		
- Correct as of 26 July 2021

Tom Bowen (born 31 January 1993) is an English rugby union player. He represented Great Britain at Rugby Sevens.

== Career ==
Brighton born, Bowen took up rugby at the age of six in Lewes. Bowen joined Plymouth Albion in 2012 from Leicester Tigers, originally a centre, he switched to the wing, and scored 6 tries in his first 18 appearances in the RFU Championship, becoming Plymouth’s young player of the season for 2 seasons consecutively. He became Plymouth Albion’s top try-scorer for the 2013-14 season. Bowen made his England Sevens debut on the Gold Coast, Australia in October 2014.

During the COVID-19 pandemic Bowen taught rugby and fitness, both online and in schools alongside England teammates such as Megan Jones. In June 2021 he was confirmed as the reserve in the Great Britain Rugby Sevens squad for the delayed 2020 Summer Games in Tokyo. He was named in the England squad for the 2022 Rugby World Cup Sevens held in Cape Town, South Africa in September 2022.

In 2022, Bowen signed for Worthing Rugby Football Club in the fourth tier of the English rugby union league system; National League 2 East.
