= 2025 Rugby Premier League =

2025 season of Rugby Premier League

- Countries: India
- Number of teams: 6
- Date: 15 June – 29 June 2025
- Champions: Chennai Bulls (1st title)
- Runners-up: Delhi Redz
- Matches played: 34
- Tries scored: 206 (average 6.1 per match)
- Top point scorer: (Samoa) Va'a Apelu Maliko
- Top try scorer: (Samoa) Va'a Apelu Maliko

Official website
- www.rugbypremierleague.in

The 2025 Rugby Premier League was the first season of the Rugby Premier League. It was held from 15 to 29 June 2025 with 6 city-based teams. Chennai Bulls defeated Delhi Redz 41–0 to win the inaugural title.

== History ==
In April 2025, the six teams were announced: Bengaluru Bravehearts, Chennai Bulls, Delhi Redz, Hyderabad Heroes, Kalinga Black Tigers and Mumbai Dreamers. World Rugby granted RPL a 15-day window, ensuring no other rugby sevens tournaments took place during this period. This allowed participation of some of the biggest names in the sport.

A lineup of 30 marquee international players from rugby powerhouse nations were bought during the auction. The broadcasting and streaming rights were sold to Star Sports and JioHotstar. Renowned coaches Mike Friday, Ben Gollings, DJ Forbes, Tomasi Cama, Francisco Hernández, and Tim Walsh were roped in for the league.

From the domestic circuit, 30 Indian players were selected from an auction pool of 71. Mohit Khatri, captain of the national rugby 7s team went for ₹4.5 lakh. Dream11 chief marketing officer Vikrant Mudaliar revealed that the platform, which has 240 million users, will launch a rugby fantasy sports category to coincide with the RPL.

== Format and venue ==
=== Format ===
The teams competed against each other during a 34-match schedule over 15 days.

- Rugby Premier League featured 2 matches per night on weekdays and 3 matches per night on weekends.
- Matches were 4 minutes a quarter + 2 minutes break between each quarter which meant 22 minutes per match.
- A round-robin format saw 30 pool games with each team playing 10 pool matches. There were two semi-finals, a bronze medal match and the finale for a total of 34 matches.
- Teams played a maximum of 10 pool games + 2 playoff matches over 15 days.

=== Venue ===
The matches were held at the Mumbai Football Arena, Mumbai, Maharashtra.

Mumbai
Mumbai Football Arena
Capacity: 7,000
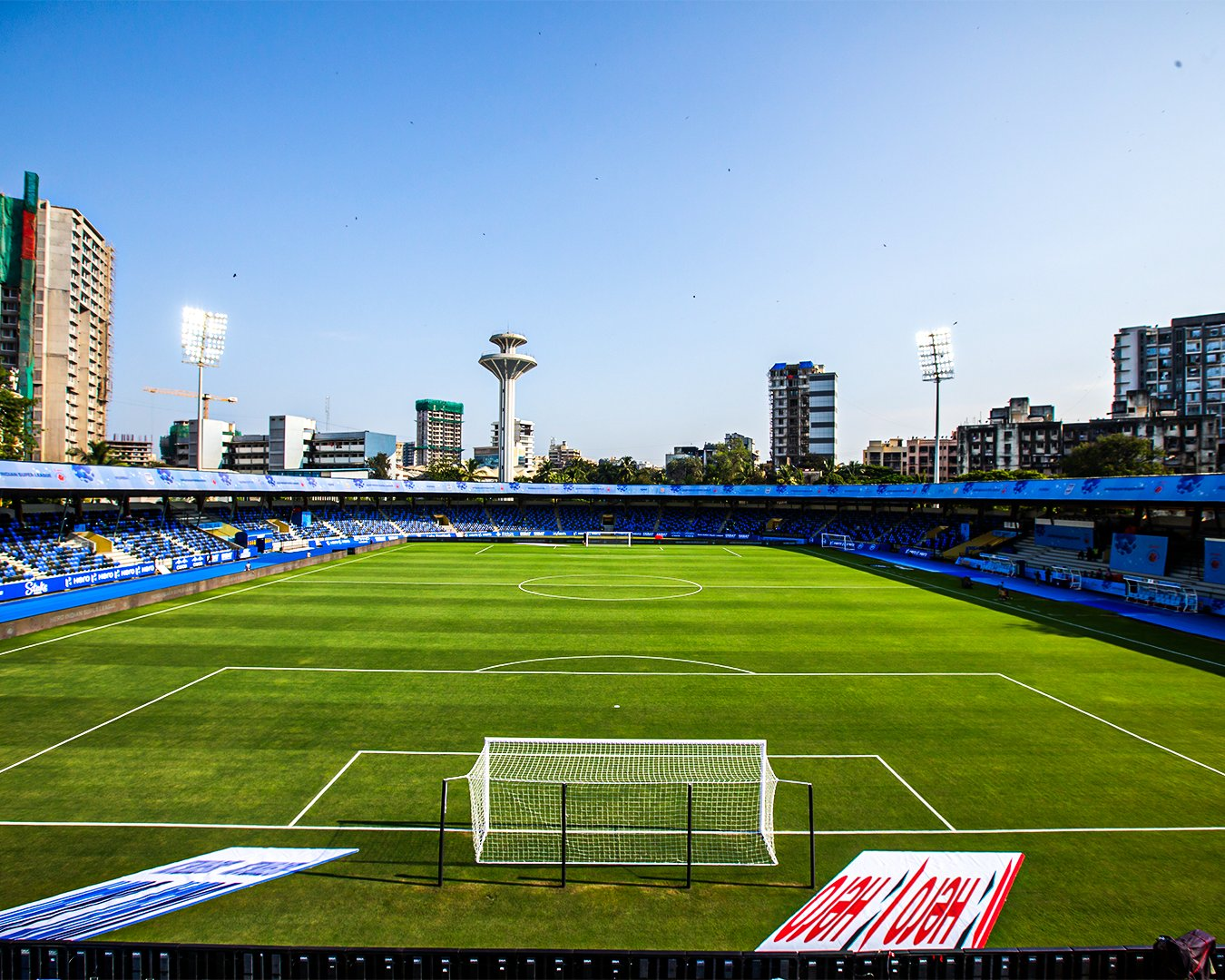

== Teams ==
Club	City	Head Coach	Captain
Bengaluru Bravehearts	Bengaluru	(Spain) Francisco Hernández	(New Zealand) Scott Curry (Spain) Pol Pla
Chennai Bulls	Chennai	(England) Ben Gollings	(United Kingdom) Alex Davis
Delhi Redz	Delhi	(New Zealand) Tomasi Cama	(Argentina) Matías Osadczuk
Hyderabad Heroes	Hyderabad	(New Zealand) DJ Forbes	(Spain) Manu Moreno
Kalinga Black Tigers	Bhubaneswar	(England) Mike Friday	(Ireland) Harry McNulty
Mumbai Dreamers	Mumbai	(Australia) Tim Walsh	(India) Akash Balmiki

== Squads ==
Experienced marquee rugby players were picked up at the draft. The bridge and Indian players were bought at the auction.

Bengaluru Bravehearts	Chennai Bulls	Delhi Redz	Hyderabad Heroes	Kalinga Black Tigers	Mumbai Dreamers
(New Zealand) Akuila Rokolisoa (Fiji) Iowane Teba (New Zealand) Tone Ng Shiu (New Zealand) Scott Curry (C) (Spain) Pol Pla (C) (Uganda) Philip Wokorach (Canada) Liam Poulton (Hong Kong) Mak Chung (India) Mohit Khatri (India) Suresh Kumar (India) Karan Rajbhar (India) Prashant Singh (India) Arpan Chhetri	(Ireland) Terry Kennedy (Fiji) Joseva Talacolo (Argentina) Joaquín Pellandini (Fiji) Filipe Sauturaga (United Kingdom) Alex Davis (C) (Germany) Nikias von der Lohe (Germany) Haakon Oeß (Samoa) Va'a Apelu Maliko (India) Akhil Anand (India) Shanawaz Ahmed (India) Aryan Dixit (India) Muhammed Jasim (India) Vallabh Patil	(Argentina) Matteo Graziano (Kenya) Patrick Odongo (Ireland) Jordan Conroy (Argentina) Matías Osadczuk (C) (Spain) Alejandro Laforga (es) (Germany) Robin Plümpe (Hong Kong) Michael Coverdale (Germany) Moritz Noll (India) Rajdeep Saha (India) Deepak Punia (India) Mohit Tushir (India) Sunil Chawan (India) Raj Kumar	(Kenya) Kevin Wekesa (Fiji) Joji Nasova (Fiji) Terio Tamani (Argentina) Lautaro Bazán (Spain) Manu Moreno (C) (Samoa) Motu Opetai (Germany) Max Roddick (Germany) Wolfram Hacker (India) Prince Khatri (India) Sumit Roy (India) Javed Hussain (India) Sukumar Hembrom (India) Sambit Pradhan	(South Africa) Rosko Specman (United States) Lucas Lacamp (United States) Perry Baker (Ireland) Harry McNulty (C) (Australia) Maurice Longbottom (Canada) Kyle Tremblay (Canada) Ethan Turner (Canada) James Thiel (India) Ajay Deswal (India) Asis Sabar (India) Deepraj Rajabhosale (India) Pardeep Singh (India) Arjun Mahato	(Fiji) Waisea Nacuqu (Australia) Henry Hutchison (United States) Aaron Cummings (Fiji) Jerry Tuwai (Australia) James Turner (Canada) Elias Hancock (Canada) Rhys James (Canada) Briar Barron (India) Neeraj Khatri (India) Devendra Padir (India) Akash Balmiki (C) (India) Nayan Kumar (India) Ganesh Majhi

== Points table ==
Pos	Team	Pld	W	D	L	Pts	Qualification
1	Hyderabad Heroes	10	9	0	1	36	Advance to playoffs
2	Chennai Bulls (C)	10	6	1	3	25	Advance to playoffs
3	Bengaluru Bravehearts	10	5	1	4	21	Advance to playoffs
4	Delhi Redz	10	3	2	5	14	Advance to playoffs
5	Kalinga Black Tigers	10	2	2	6	10	
6	Mumbai Dreamers	10	1	2	7	6	

First match(es) will be played: 1 June 2025. Source: Rugby Premier League
Rules for classification: Tiebreakers for teams tied on points: 1) Number of matches won; 2) Difference between points for and against; 3) Total number of points for; 4) Aggregate number of points scored in matches between tied teams; 5) Number of matches won excluding the first match, then the second and so on until the tie is settled.
(C) Champion

== League stage ==
15 June 2025
19:45

Bengaluru Bravehearts	21–21	Delhi Redz
	Report

Mumbai Football Arena, Mumbai
Referee: Craig Chan

15 June 2025
20:25

Chennai Bulls	24–5	Mumbai Dreamers
	Report

Mumbai Football Arena, Mumbai
Referee: Ibuki Tetsuka

15 June 2025
21:05

Hyderabad Heroes	24–14	Kalinga Black Tigers
	Report

Mumbai Football Arena, Mumbai
Referee: Tetsuya Hirakawa

16 June 2025
19:45

Kalinga Black Tigers	10–35	Bengaluru Bravehearts
	Report

Mumbai Football Arena, Mumbai
Referee: Ibuki Tetsuka

16 June 2025
20:25

Mumbai Dreamers	17–31	Chennai Bulls
	Report

Mumbai Football Arena, Mumbai
Referee: Craig Chan

17 June 2025
19:45

Delhi Redz	7–21	Chennai Bulls
	Report

Mumbai Football Arena, Mumbai
Referee: Tetsuya Hirakawa

17 June 2025
20:25

Hyderabad Heroes	43–7	Bengaluru Bravehearts
	Report

Mumbai Football Arena, Mumbai
Referee: Ibuki Tetsuka

18 June 2025
19:45

Chennai Bulls	26–26	Kalinga Black Tigers
	Report

Mumbai Football Arena, Mumbai
Referee: Craig Chan

18 June 2025
20:25

Mumbai Dreamers	7–20	Delhi Redz
	Report

Mumbai Football Arena, Mumbai
Referee: Tetsuya Hirakawa

19 June 2025
19:45

Bengaluru Bravehearts	12–7	Mumbai Dreamers
	Report

Mumbai Football Arena, Mumbai
Referee: Craig Chan

19 June 2025
20:25

Kalinga Black Tigers	12–43	Hyderabad Heroes
	Report

Mumbai Football Arena, Mumbai
Referee: Ibuki Tetsuka

20 June 2025
19:45

Bengaluru Bravehearts	26–0	Chennai Bulls
	Report

Mumbai Football Arena, Mumbai
Referee: Ibuki Tetsuka

20 June 2025
20:25

Kalinga Black Tigers	7–14	Delhi Redz
	Report

Mumbai Football Arena, Mumbai
Referee: Craig Chan

20 June 2025
21:05

Mumbai Dreamers	12–19	Hyderabad Heroes
	Report

Mumbai Football Arena, Mumbai
Referee: Tetsuya Hirakawa

21 June 2025
19:45

Chennai Bulls	31–24	Bengaluru Bravehearts
	Report

Mumbai Football Arena, Mumbai
Referee: Craig Chan

21 June 2025
20:25

Hyderabad Heroes	24–17	Mumbai Dreamers
	Report

Mumbai Football Arena, Mumbai
Referee: Ibuki Tetsuka

21 June 2025
21:05

Delhi Redz	15–19	Kalinga Black Tigers
	Report

Mumbai Football Arena, Mumbai
Referee: Tetsuya Hirakawa

22 June 2025
19:45

Bengaluru Bravehearts	26–21	Hyderabad Heroes
	Report

Mumbai Football Arena, Mumbai
Referee: Ibuki Tetsuka

22 June 2025
20:25

Chennai Bulls	24–7	Delhi Redz
	Report

Mumbai Football Arena, Mumbai
Referee: Tetsuya Hirakawa

22 June 2025
21:05

Kalinga Black Tigers	17–17	Mumbai Dreamers
	Report

Mumbai Football Arena, Mumbai
Referee: Craig Chan

23 June 2025
19:45

Delhi Redz	22–12	Bengaluru Bravehearts
	Report

Mumbai Football Arena, Mumbai
Referee: Craig Chan

23 June 2025
20:25

Hyderabad Heroes	28–7	Chennai Bulls
	Report

Mumbai Football Arena, Mumbai
Referee: Tetsuya Hirakawa

24 June 2025
19:45

Mumbai Dreamers	5–33	Kalinga Black Tigers
	Report

Mumbai Football Arena, Mumbai
Referee: Ibuki Tetsuka

24 June 2025
20:25

Chennai Bulls	0–17	Hyderabad Heroes
	Report

Mumbai Football Arena, Mumbai
Referee: Craig Chan

25 June 2025
19:45

Bengaluru Bravehearts	34–26	Kalinga Black Tigers
	Report

Mumbai Football Arena, Mumbai
Referee: Ibuki Tetsuka

25 June 2025
20:25

Delhi Redz	19–19	Mumbai Dreamers
	Report

Mumbai Football Arena, Mumbai
Referee: Tetsuya Hirakawa

26 June 2025
19:45

Kalinga Black Tigers	21–40	Chennai Bulls
	Report

Mumbai Football Arena, Mumbai
Referee: Craig Chan

26 June 2025
20:25

Hyderabad Heroes	40–19	Delhi Redz
	Report

Mumbai Football Arena, Mumbai
Referee: Tetsuya Hirakawa

27 June 2025
19:45

Delhi Redz	7–31	Hyderabad Heroes
	Report

Mumbai Football Arena, Mumbai
Referee: Tetsuya Hirakawa

27 June 2025
20:25

Mumbai Dreamers	26–14	Bengaluru Bravehearts
	Report

Mumbai Football Arena, Mumbai
Referee: Craig Chan

== Playoffs ==
Semi-finals
28 June – Mumbai Football Arena
Chennai Bulls	31
Bengaluru Bravehearts	12
28 June – Mumbai Football Arena
Hyderabad Heroes	7
Delhi Redz	14

Final
29 June – Mumbai Football Arena
Chennai Bulls	41
Delhi Redz	0
Third place playoff
29 June – Mumbai Football Arena
Bengaluru Bravehearts	17
Hyderabad Heroes	12

=== Semi-finals ===
28 June 2025
19:30

Chennai Bulls	31–12	Bengaluru Bravehearts
	Report

Mumbai Football Arena, Mumbai
Referee: Craig Chan

28 June 2025
20:00

Hyderabad Heroes	7–14	Delhi Redz
	Report

Mumbai Football Arena, Mumbai
Referee: Ibuki Tetsuka

=== Third place playoff ===
29 June 2025
19:30

Bengaluru Bravehearts	12–17	Hyderabad Heroes
	Report

Mumbai Football Arena, Mumbai
Referee: Tetsuya Hirakawa

=== Final ===
29 June 2025
20:00

Chennai Bulls	41–0	Delhi Redz
	Report

Mumbai Football Arena, Mumbai
Referee: Craig Chan

== Statistics ==
=== Most points ===
Player	Team	Points
(Samoa) Va'a Apelu Maliko	Chennai Bulls	75
(New Zealand) Akuila Rokolisoa	Bengaluru Bravehearts	69
(Fiji) Terio Tamani	Hyderabad Heroes	66
(Uganda) Philip Wokorach	Bengaluru Bravehearts	64
(Fiji) Joji Nasova	Hyderabad Heroes	52

=== Most tries ===
Player	Team	Tries
(Samoa) Va'a Apelu Maliko	Chennai Bulls	15
(Uganda) Philip Wokorach	Bengaluru Bravehearts	12
(Fiji) Joji Nasova	Hyderabad Heroes	10
(India) Javed Hussain	Hyderabad Heroes	8
(Republic of Ireland) Terry Kennedy	Chennai Bulls	8

=== Most conversions ===
Player	Team	Conversions
(Fiji) Terio Tamani	Hyderabad Heroes	18
(New Zealand) Akuila Rokolisoa	Bengaluru Bravehearts	17
(Australia) Maurice Longbottom	Kalinga Black Tigers	14
(Fiji) Filipe Sauturaga	Chennai Bulls	11
(Argentina) Joaquín Pellandini	Chennai Bulls	10

=== Most tackles ===
Player	Team	Tackles
(Germany) Max Roddick	Hyderabad Heroes	31
(Spain) Manu Moreno	Hyderabad Heroes	30
(Fiji) Joseva Talacolo	Chennai Bulls	28
(Hong Kong) Michael Coverdale	Delhi Redz	27
(Fiji) Filipe Sauturaga	Chennai Bulls	27

== Awards ==
Category	Player	Team
Player of the Tournament	(Samoa) Va'a Apelu Maliko	Chennai Bulls
Emerging Player of the Seasom	(Uganda) Philip Wokorach	Bengaluru Bravehearts
Indian Player of the Season	(India) Javed Hussain	Hyderabad Heroes

== Broadcasting ==
India

- JioHotstar
- Star Sports

Online

- RugbyPass TV
