= Rugby Premier League =

Indian rugby league

- Most recent season or competition: 2026 Rugby Premier League
- Sport: Rugby sevens
- Founded: 2024; 2 years ago
- First season: 2025
- Administrator: Rugby India; GMR Sports
- Motto: Rug Rug Mein Rugby
- No. of teams: M: 6 W: 4
- Country: India
- Headquarters: Mumbai, Maharashtra
- Most recent champion: Hyderabad Heroes (M) Delhi Redz (W) (2026)
- Broadcasters: India: Star Sports; JioHotstar; Others: RugbyPass TV
- Tournament format: Double round-robin; Knock-out
- Website: RPL

Rugby Premier League (RPL), also known as HSBC Rugby Premier League due to sponsorship reasons, is a professional rugby sevens league based in India. It is organized by Rugby India, the governing body for the sport in the nation. It is the first franchise-based sevens rugby league in the world. It was founded in 2024 to boost the growth and popularity of rugby sevens. It debuted in 2025 with 6 city-based teams.

The 2026 season is set to expand the league with the introduction of a women’s edition, featuring four teams.

== History ==
Rugby Premier League was first announced in early 2024 as a league with six teams and a mix of Indian as well as overseas players. Baseline Ventures, who has worked with Pro Volleyball League, was supposed to be the partner for the league. In December, Rugby India announced a 10-year partnership with GMR Sports to launch the league in 2025.

In April 2025, the six teams were announced: Bengaluru Bravehearts, Chennai Bulls, Delhi Redz, Hyderabad Heroes, Kalinga Black Tigers and Mumbai Dreamers. The dates and venue were unveiled with the league being held from 1 June to 15 June at the Mumbai Football Arena. World Rugby granted RPL a 15-day window, ensuring no rugby sevens tournaments took place during this period. This allowed the participation of some of the biggest names in the sport.

A lineup of 30 marquee international players from rugby powerhouse nations were bought during the auction. The broadcasting and streaming rights were sold to Star Sports and JioHotstar. Renowned coaches Mike Friday, Ben Gollings, DJ Forbes, Tomasi Cama, Francisco Hernández, and Tim Walsh were roped in for the league.

From the domestic circuit, 30 Indian players were selected from an auction pool of 71. The 2025 season will debut with the men's league and the 2026 season is expected to feature both men's and women's league. Dream11 CMO Vikrant Mudaliar revealed that the platform, which has 240 million users, will launch a rugby fantasy sports category to coincide with the rugby league.

== Organisation ==
Rahul Bose, the president of Rugby India, revealed the league brings massive changes in infrastructure and scouting with it. The six owners send scouts across the country, find the best players and bring them back to the cities. They take care of infrastructure, from grounds to physical therapists to masseurs and nutrition coaches. The league has the best players in the world, best broadcasters plus World Rugby match referees, medical commissioners, commentators and match commissioners. The first edition was held from 15 to 29 June 2025 at the Mumbai Football Arena, Maharashtra, India.

== Format ==
The teams compete against each other during a 34-match schedule over 15 days.

- Rugby Premier League features two matches per night on weekdays and three matches per night on weekends.
- Matches last four minutes per quarter with two minutes break between each quarter, or 22 minutes per match, leading to a unique style of play as it differs from world rugby 7s format.
- A double round-robin format will see 30 pool games played, with each team playing 10 pool matches. There will be two semi-finals, a bronze medal match and a final for a total of 34 matches.
- Teams play a maximum of 10 pool games and two playoff matches.

== Auction and draft ==
Each RPL franchise consists of a 13 player squad, with the main attraction being 5 active and former international marquee players from tier-one nations, 3 bridge players and 5 Indian players.

- 5 international marquee rugby 7s players: Meant to be active players from the World Rugby Sevens ecosystem.
- 3 international bridge players: From Hong Kong, Germany and Kenya
- 5 Indian players: Meant to be India’s best rugby 7s players.
- Management team: Head coach, Indian assistant coach, physiotherapist, massage therapist and team manager.

== Teams ==
Locations of the Rugby Premier League teams

Men's
Colors	Team	City	Coach	Captain(s)
	Bengaluru Bravehearts	Bengaluru, Karnataka	(Spain) Francisco Hernández	(New Zealand) Scott Curry (Spain) Pol Pla
	Chennai Bulls	Chennai, Tamil Nadu	(England) Ben Gollings	(United Kingdom) Alex Davis
	Delhi Redz	New Delhi, Delhi	(New Zealand) Tomasi Cama	(Argentina) Matías Osadczuk
	Hyderabad Heroes	Hyderabad, Telangana	(New Zealand) DJ Forbes	(Spain) Manu Moreno
	Kolkata Banga Tigers	Kolkata, West Bengal	(England) Mike Friday	(Republic of Ireland) Harry McNulty
	Mumbai Dreamers	Mumbai, Maharashtra	(Australia) Tim Walsh	(India) Akash Balmiki

Women's
Colors	Team	City	Coach	Captain(s)
	Chennai Bulls	Chennai, Tamil Nadu	(England) Amy Turner	
	Delhi Redz	New Delhi, Delhi	(New Zealand) Edwin Cocker	
	Kolkata Banga Tigers	Kolkata, West Bengal	(South Africa) Paul Delport	
	Mumbai Dreamers	Mumbai, Maharashtra	(South Africa) Renfred Dazel	

== Editions and results ==
=== Men's ===
Season	Winner	Score	Runner up	Venue	Teams	Player of the tournament
2025	Chennai Bulls	41–0	Delhi Redz	Mumbai Football Arena	6	Va'a Apelu Maliko
2026	Hyderabad Heroes	41–17	Mumbai Dreamers	Gachibowli Stadium	6	Vuiviawa Naduvalo

=== Women's ===
Season	Winner	Score	Runner up	Venue	Teams	Player of the tournament
2026	Delhi Redz	22–10	Chennai Bulls	Gachibowli Stadium	4	Savannah Bauder

== Performance by teams ==
=== By season ===
Team	2025	2026
Bengaluru Bravehearts	4th	
Chennai Bulls	C	
Delhi Redz	RU	
Hyderabad Heroes	3rd	
Kalinga Black Tigers	5th	
Mumbai Dreamers	6th	

=== League positions ===
Season	1st	2nd	3rd	4th	5th	6th
2025	HH	CB	BB	DR	KBT	MD
2026						

Key
Champions
Runners Up
Third Place
Playoffs

== Broadcasting ==
India:

- JioHotstar
- Star Sports

Others:

- RugbyPass TV

== Sponsorship ==
Period	Sponsor	Tournament name
2025	GMR Sports	GMR Rugby Premier League
2026	HSBC	HSBC Rugby Premier League

== See also ==
- All India & South Asia Rugby Tournament
- Rugby union in India
- Sport in India
