= 2020 New Zealand Sevens =

- Sevens World Series XXI
- Host nation: New Zealand
- Date: 25–26 January 2020

Cup
- Champion: New Zealand
- Runner-up: France
- Third: Australia

Tournament details
- Matches played: 34
- Tries scored: 197 (average 5.79 per match)
- Most points: Scott Curry (30 pts)
- Most tries: Scott Curry (6 tries)

The 2020 New Zealand Sevens was the third tournament within the 2019–20 World Rugby Sevens Series and the twenty first edition of the New Zealand Sevens. This event was the first in the series to only have one team from each pool qualify to the cup knockout phase. Host team New Zealand won the tournament, defeating France by 21–5 in the final.

== Format ==
The sixteen teams were drawn into four pools of four teams, with each team playing every other team in their pool once. The top team from each pool advanced to the semifinals to playoff for berths in the cup final and third place match.

The teams that finished second in their respective pool will play another team from another pool whom finished second, however, it will be ranked as the best second placed team v. the second best second placed team and vice versa. This is the first tournament of the 2019–20 season that the format was changed to a four team cup knockout phase.

The pools and schedule were announced by World Rugby on 20 December 2019.

== Pool stage ==
All times in NZL Standard Time (UTC+12:00)

=== Pool A ===
Team	Pld	W	D	L	PF	PA	PD	Pts	Qualification
New Zealand	3	3	0	0	111	17	+94	9	Advance to semifinals
United States	3	2	0	1	71	33	+38	7	5th-place playoff
Scotland	3	1	0	2	43	81	–38	5	11th-place playoff
Wales	3	0	0	3	19	113	–94	3	15th-place playoff

25 January 2020
14:09

Scotland	7–24	United States
Try: McFarland 4'c Con: Fergusson (1/1) 5'	Report	Try: Isles 3'c Tomasin 6'm Unufe 10'c Baker 13'm Con: Hughes (2/4) 3', 11'

Waikato Stadium
Referee: Jérémy Rozier (France)

25 January 2020
14:31

New Zealand	47–0	Wales
Try: Mikkelson (2) 0'c, 3'c Ware 2'c Webber 6'c Curry 7'm Baker 9'c Koroi 11'c Con: McGarvey-Black (5/6) 1', 2', 3', 6', 9'; Koroi (1/1) 11'	Report

Waikato Stadium
Referee: Damián Schneider (Argentina)

25 January 2020
20:05

Scotland	24–19	Wales
Try: McCann 0'm Elms 3'm Kelly 8'c Fife 12'c Con: Lowe (2/4) 8', 12'	Report	Try: Jones (2) 5'c, 10'm Roach 7'c Con: Treharne (2/3) 5', 7'

Waikato Stadium
Referee: Francisco González (Uruguay)

25 January 2020
20:33

New Zealand	26–5	United States
Try: Curry 1'c Baker 6'c Mikkelson 11'c Dickson 13'm Con: McGarvey-Black (2/2) 1', 11'; Baker (1/1) 6'; Koroi (0/1)	Report	Try: Baker 4'm Con: Hughes (0/1)

Waikato Stadium
Referee: Jordan Way (Australia)

26 January 2020
13:19

United States	42–0	Wales
Try: Isles 1'c Tomasin 3'c Pinkelman 6'c Fuala'au (2) 7'c, 10'c Baker 12'c Con: Hughes (5/5) 1', 6', 8', 10', 13'; Tomasin (1/1) 3'	Report

Waikato Stadium
Referee: Damon Murphy (Australia)

26 January 2020
13:41

New Zealand	38–12	Scotland
Try: Mikkelson (2) 0'm, 7'c Ng Shiu 5'm Collier 8'c Curry 11'c Koroi 12'c Con: Koroi (3/4) 7', 8', 13'; McGarvey-Black (1/1) 11'; Mikkelson (0/1)	Report	Try: Fergusson 3'm McCann 9'c Con: Fergusson (1/1) 10'; Lowe (0/1)

Waikato Stadium
Referee: Craig Evans (Wales)

=== Pool B ===
Team	Pld	W	D	L	PF	PA	PD	Pts	Qualification
England	3	3	0	0	71	45	+26	9	Advance to semifinals
Kenya	3	1	1	1	67	50	+17	6	7th-place playoff
South Africa	3	1	0	2	64	62	+2	5	9th-place playoff
Japan	3	0	1	2	24	69	–45	4	13th-place playoff

25 January 2020
12:41

Kenya	19–24	England
Try: Ambaka (2) 0'm, 4'c Amonde 5'c Con: Taabu (2/3) 4', 6'	Report	Try: Lindsay-Hague 3'm Norton 7'c Edwards (2) 9'm, 12'c Con: Mitchell (1/2) 7'; Edwards (1/2) 12'

Waikato Stadium
Referee: Jordan Way (Australia)

25 January 2020
13:03

South Africa	31–5	Japan
Try: du Plessis 5'm Pretorius 7'c Afrika 9'm A. Davids (2) 12'c, 14'c Con: du Preez (1/3) 7'; Geduld (2/2) 12', 14'	Report	Try: Tuiaki 7'm Con: Goya (0/1)

Waikato Stadium
Referee: Francisco González (Uruguay)

25 January 2020
18:08

Kenya	12–12	Japan
Try: Otieno 1'm Taabu 8'c Con: Taabu (1/2) 9'	Report	Try: Ishida 7'm Ozawa 11'c Con: Fujita (1/1) 11'; Goya (0/1)

Waikato Stadium
Referee: James Doleman (New Zealand)

25 January 2020
18:30

South Africa	19–21	England
Try: Gans 1'c Pretorius 3'c Geduld 13'm Con: du Preez (2/2) 2', 4'; Geduld (0/1)	Report	Try: Norton 5'c Bowen 7'c Burgess 11'c Con: Bibby (1/1) 6'; Mitchell (1/1) 7'; Edwards (1/1) 12'

Waikato Stadium
Referee: Richard Kelly (New Zealand)

26 January 2020
11:51

England	26–7	Japan
Try: Kerr 1'c Bowen 5'c Norton 9'm Hendy 12'c Con: Mitchell (1/1) 1'; Bibby (1/2) 5'; Edwards (1/1) 13'	Report	Try: Goto 7'c Con: Kano (1/1) 7'

Waikato Stadium
Referee: Damián Schneider (Argentina)

26 January 2020
12:13

South Africa	14–36	Kenya
Try: du Plessis 7'c Z. Davids 12'c Con: du Preez (1/1) 7'; S. Davids (1/1) 12'	Report	Try: Ambaka 3'm Okwach 4'c Injera 6'c Oluoch 7'm Otieno 13'm Onyala 14'c Con: Olindi (2/4) 4', 6'; Taabu (1/2) 14'

Waikato Stadium
Referee: Jérémy Rozier (France)

=== Pool C ===
Team	Pld	W	D	L	PF	PA	PD	Pts	Qualification
France	3	2	1	0	50	36	+14	8	Advance to semifinals
Canada	3	2	1	0	59	47	+12	8	5th-place playoff
Ireland	3	1	0	2	56	60	-4	5	11th-place playoff
Spain	3	0	0	3	48	70	–22	3	13th-place playoff

25 January 2020
11:57

Ireland	21–26	Canada
Try: Kennedy 2'c Horan 7'c Conroy 12'c Con: Dardis (3/3) 2', 7', 13'	Report	Try: Coe 4'c Thiel 7'c Hirayama 11'c Berna 14'm Con: Hirayama (3/4) 4', 7', 11'

Waikato Stadium
Referee: Damon Murphy (Australia)

25 January 2020
12:19

France	21–17	Spain
Try: Veredamu 2'c Valleau 11'c Mazzoleni 12'c Con: Barraque (3/3) 2', 11', 12'	Report	Try: Hernández 5'c M. Sainz-Trapaga 6'm Pla 8'm Con: Hernández (1/3) 5'

Waikato Stadium
Referee: Craig Evans (Wales)

25 January 2020
17:24

Ireland	28–17	Spain
Try: Horan 1'c Conroy 7'c Kennedy 9'c McNulty 12'c Con: Dardis (4/4) 1', 7', 10', 12'	Report	Try: Rodriguez-Guerra 4'm Fontes 5'c Lopez 14'm Con: Hernández (1/2) 6'; Mateu (0/1)

Waikato Stadium
Referee: Jérémy Rozier (France)

25 January 2020
17:46

France	12–12	Canada
Try: Riva 0'm Barraque 9'c Con: Barraque (1/2) 9'	Report	Try: Berna 2'c Richard 13'm Con: Hirayama (1/2) 3'

Waikato Stadium
Referee: Damián Schneider (Argentina)

26 January 2020
11:07

Canada	21–14	Spain
Try: Hirayama (2) 4'c, 10'c Jones 8'c Con: Hirayama (3/3) 4', 9', 10'	Report	Try: Pla 0'c Hernández 2'c Con: Hernández (2/2) 0', 3'

Waikato Stadium
Referee: James Doleman (New Zealand)

26 January 2020
11:29

France	17–7	Ireland
Try: Veredamu (2) 1'c, 13'm Parez 7'm Con: Riva (1/3) 1'	Report	Try: Conroy 5'c Con: Dardis (1/1) 6'

Waikato Stadium
Referee: Richard Kelly (New Zealand)

=== Pool D ===
Team	Pld	W	D	L	PF	PA	PD	Pts	Qualification
Australia	3	2	0	1	83	45	+38	7	Advance to semifinals
Argentina	3	2	0	1	73	48	+25	7	7th-place playoff
Fiji	3	2	0	1	48	50	-2	7	9th-place playoff
Samoa	3	0	0	3	31	92	-61	3	15th-place playoff

25 January 2020
13:25

Argentina	7–38	Australia
Try: Osadczuk 3'c Con: Mare (1/1) 3'	Report	Try: Longbottom (2) 0'c, 10'c Hutchison 5'c Anderson 6'm Holland 8'c Turner 13'm Con: Longbottom (2/3) 1', 11'; Holland (2/3) 5', 8'

Waikato Stadium
Referee: James Doleman (New Zealand)

25 January 2020
13:47

Fiji	19–12	Samoa
Try: Tuwai 2'c Botitu 6'm Tuimaba 11'c Con: Bolaca (1/2) 3'; Nacuqu (1/1) 12'	Report	Try: Maliko 1'c Perez 9'm Con: Alosio (1/2) 1'

Waikato Stadium
Referee: Richard Kelly (New Zealand)

25 January 2020
19:05

Argentina	40–0	Samoa
Try: Gonzalez (2) 0'c, 4'c Osadczuk (2) 6'c, 13'c Schulz 7'c Sábato 11'm Con: Mare (4/4) 1', 4', 6', 8'; Isgro (1/2) 13'	Report

Waikato Stadium
Referee: Damon Murphy (Australia)

25 January 2020
19:35

Fiji	19–12	Australia
Try: Ratuvoka 3'm Tuimaba 8'c Cakaubalavu 12'c Con: Nacuqu (1/1) 9'; Ikanikoda (1/1) 12'; Botitu (0/1)	Report	Try: Pietsch 10'm O'Donnell 14'c Con: Longbottom (1/1) 14'; Holland (0/1)

Waikato Stadium
Referee: Craig Evans (Wales)

26 January 2020
12:35

Australia	33–19	Samoa
Try: Turner (3) 4'c, 7'c, 13'c Pincus 8'c Longbottom 14'm Con: Holland (4/5) 4', 7', 9', 13'	Report	Try: Afamasaga 1'c Alofipo 6'm Solia 10'c Con: Alosio (2/3) 1', 11'

Waikato Stadium
Referee: Francisco González (Uruguay)

26 January 2020
12:57

Fiji	10–26	Argentina
Try: Mocenacagi 7'm Botitu 8'm Con: Botitu (0/1); Nacuqu (0/1)	Report	Try: Álvarez 1'c Schulz 2'c Osadczuk 4'c Sábato 12'm Con: Mare (3/3) 1', 3', 5'; Isgro (0/1)

Waikato Stadium
Referee: Jordan Way (Australia)

== Placement matches ==
=== Fifteenth place ===
26 January 2020
17:10

Samoa	21–7	Wales
Try: Afamasaga 3'c Maliko (2) 11'c, 14'c Con: Alosio (3/3) 4', 12', 14'	Report	Try: Smith 1'c Con: Thomas (1/1) 2'

Waikato Stadium
Referee: Francisco González (Uruguay)

=== Thirteenth place ===
26 January 2020
17:32

Japan	15–19	Spain
Try: Goya (2) 4'm, 8'm Goto 6'm Con: Goya (0/3)	Report	Try: Mateu (2) 2', 7'; De La Rosa 13'c Con: Hernández (1/2) 3'; Fontes (1/1) 14'

Waikato Stadium
Referee: Damián Schneider (Argentina)

=== Eleventh place ===
26 January 2020
17:54

Ireland	19–24	Scotland
Try: Kennedy (2) 1'c, 7'm Conroy 8'c Con: Dardis (2/3) 1', 8'	Report	Try: Fife 4'm McFarland 5'c Lowe 10'c Coombes 12'm Con: Lowe (2/3) 6', 10'

Waikato Stadium
Referee: Craig Evans (Wales)

=== Ninth place ===
26 January 2020
18:16

Fiji	12–5	South Africa
Try: Tabu 13'c Bolaca 14'm Con: Ikanikoda (1/2) 13'	Report	Try: A. Davids 0'm Con: S. Davids (0/1)

Waikato Stadium
Referee: Jordan Way (Australia)

=== Seventh place ===
26 January 2020
18:38

Argentina	19–17	Kenya
Try: del Mestre (2) 0'c, 8'c Sábato 10'm Con: Isgro (2/3) 0', 8'	Report	Try: Oyoo 1'c Injera 3'm Ambaka 6'm Con: Olindi (1/3) 2'

Waikato Stadium
Referee: Richard Kelly (New Zealand)

=== Fifth place ===
26 January 2020
19:00

Canada	28–7	United States
Try: Sauder 1'c Hammond 3'c Kay 7'c Berna 10'c Con: Kay (4/4) 2', 3', 7', 11'	Report	Try: Williams 8'c Con: Hughes (1/1) 8'

Waikato Stadium
Referee: Damon Murphy (Australia)

== Cup ==
Semi-finals
26 January – 16:20 – Waikato
England	5
France	10
26 January – 16:42 – Waikato
New Zealand	17
Australia	14

Final
26 January – 20:56 – Waikato
France	5
New Zealand	27
Third place
26 January – 19:29 – Waikato
England	21
Australia	33

Matches

Semi-finals

26 January 2020
16:20

England	5–10	France
Try: Ellery 5'm Con: Mitchell (0/1)	Report	Try: Siega 0'c Bouhraoua `3'm Con: Riva (0/2)

Waikato Stadium
Referee: James Doleman (New Zealand)

26 January 2020
16:42

New Zealand	17–14	Australia
Try: McGarvey-Black 1'm Ware 8'c Collier 9'm Con: McGarvey-Black (1/3) 8'	Report	Try: Malouf 5'c Hutchison 6'c Con: Holland (2/2) 6', 7'

Waikato Stadium
Referee: Jérémy Rozier (France)

3rd place

26 January 2020
19:29

England	21–33	Australia
Try: Johnson 0'c Lindsay-Hague 12'c Edwards 14'c Con: Edwards (3/3) 0', 12', 14'	Report	Try: Anderson 2'c Davies 5'c Turner 7'c Hutchison (2) 8'm, 10'c Con: Holland (4/5) 2', 6', 7', 10'

Waikato Stadium
Referee: Francisco González (Uruguay)

Cup Final

26 January 2020
20:56

France	5–27	New Zealand
Try: Veredamu 4'm Con: Riva (0/1)	Report	Try: Curry (3) 1'c, 13'm, 14'; Ware (2) 7'm, 10'm Con: McGarvey-Black (1/4) 2'

Waikato Stadium
Referee: Craig Evans (Wales)

== Tournament placings ==
Place	Team	Points
1st place, gold medalist(s)	New Zealand	22
2nd place, silver medalist(s)	France	19
3rd place, bronze medalist(s)	Australia	17
4	England	15
5	Canada	13
6	United States	12
7	Argentina	11
8	Kenya	10

Place	Team	Points
9	Fiji	8
10	South Africa	7
11	Scotland	6
12	Ireland	5
13	Spain	4
14	Japan	3
15	Samoa	2
16	Wales	1

== See also ==
- 2020 New Zealand Women's Sevens
- World Rugby Sevens Series
- 2019–20 World Rugby Sevens Series

World Sevens Series XIX
Preceded by 2019 South Africa Sevens	2020 New Zealand Sevens	Succeeded by 2020 Sydney Sevens
New Zealand Sevens
Preceded by 2019 New Zealand Sevens	2020 New Zealand Sevens	Succeeded by 2021 New Zealand Sevens
