= India national team =

India national team may refer to:

- Badminton
  - India national badminton team
- Baseball
  - India men's national baseball team
  - India women's national baseball team
  - India men's national 3x3 team
  - India women's national 3x3 team
- Basketball
  - India men's national basketball team
  - India women's national basketball team
- Cricket
  - India men's national cricket team
  - India women's national cricket team
- Field hockey
  - India men's national field hockey team
  - India women's national field hockey team
- Football
  - India men's national football team
  - India women's national football team
- Handball
  - India men's national handball team
  - India women's national handball team
- Ice hockey
  - India men's national ice hockey team
  - India women's national ice hockey team
- Inline hockey
  - India men's national inline hockey team
  - India women's national inline hockey team
- Kabaddi
  - India men's national kabaddi team
  - India women's national kabaddi team
- Netball
  - India national netball team
- Rugby
  - India national rugby union team
  - India women's national rugby union team
  - India men's national rugby sevens team
  - India women's national rugby sevens team
- Squash
  - India men's national squash team
  - India women's national squash team
- Tennis
  - India Davis Cup team
  - India Billie Jean King Cup team
- Volleyball
  - India men's national volleyball team
  - India women's national volleyball team
