= Luciano González (rugby union) =

Argentine rugby union player

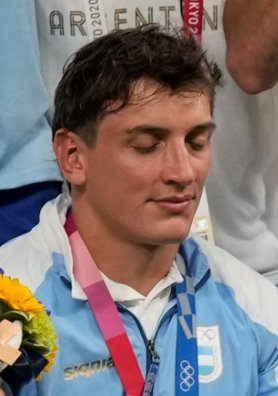
- González in 2021
- Full name: Luciano Daniel González Rizzoni
- Born: 10 April 1997 (age 29) La Rioja, Argentina
- Height: 1.85 m (6 ft 1 in)
- Weight: 85 kg (187 lb)

Rugby union career
Senior career
Years	Team	Apps	(Points)
2025	Hyderabad Heroes		
2026	Delhi Redz		
National sevens team
Years	Team		Comps
- Argentina
Medal record
Men's rugby sevens
Representing Argentina
Olympic Games
Bronze medal – third place	2020 Tokyo	Team competition
Pan American Games
Gold medal – first place	2019 Lima	Team competition
Gold medal – first place	2023 Santiago	Team competition

Luciano Daniel González Rizzoni (Note: In this Spanish name, the first or paternal surname is González and the second or maternal family name is Rizzoni.) (born 10 April 1997) is an Argentine rugby union player. He has competed for Argentina in rugby sevens at the Olympic Games, and was named player of the year for the 2024-25 SVNS series.

== Career ==
He won gold at the 2019 Pan American Games in Lima, Peru. He was named in the Argentina squad for the Rugby sevens at the 2020 Summer Olympics. In both the 2021-22 and 2022-23 seasons, González was named in the HSBC Sevens Series Dream Team.

In 2022, González competed for Argentina at the 2022 Rugby World Cup Sevens in Cape Town. In 2023 he scored his hundredth try for the Argentine 7s team.

As of 22 May 2023, González has played in 249 matches and scored 118 tries for Argentina at the World Rugby Sevens Series.

He was a member of Argentina's sevens team that competed at the 2024 Summer Olympics in Paris. He was a try scorer in the third/fourth playoff at the SVNS World Championship in Los Angeles in May 2025. In May 2025, he was named Player of the Year for the 2024-25 SVNS series. Having continued with the team for the 2025-26 SVNS, he was named in the Team of the Season in June 2026.

In July 2026, he was one of the first players announced for the Ultimate Sevens Championship, prior to the inaugural competition set to launch later that year.

== Personal life ==
Born in La Rioja, Argentina, he would get up at five in the morning to go to train in La Tablada, Argentina.
