= Bhupinder =

Bhupinder is an Indian male name and may refer to:

- Bhupinder Singh Hooda, Indian politician
- Bhupinder Nath Kirpal, Indian judge
- Bhupinder Singh (musician), Indian singer and musician
- Bhupinder Singh of Patiala (1891–1938), Maharaja of Patiala
- Bhupinder Singh, Sr. (born 1965), Indian cricketer

See also

- Bhupinder Singh (disambiguation)
