= Chennai Bulls =

Chennai based rugby sevens franchise team

- Full name: Chennai Bulls
- Nickname: The Bulls
- Founded: 2025
- Chairman: Ansh Gautam
- CEO: Anand Godiwala
- Coach: (England) Ben Gollings
- Captain: (United Kingdom) Alex Davis
- Top scorer: (Samoa) Va'a Apelu Maliko
- Most tries: (Samoa) Va'a Apelu Maliko
- League: Rugby Premier League
- 2025: Champions
1st kit	2nd kit

First match
- 24–5 vs Mumbai Dreamers

Largest win
- 41–0 vs Delhi Redz

Largest defeat
- 0–26 vs Bengaluru Bravehearts

Official website
- chennaibullsrugby.com
- Current season

Chennai Bulls is a professional rugby sevens franchise team. Based in Chennai, Tamil Nadu, it competes in the Rugby Premier League. Alex Davis is the captain while Ben Gollings is the coach as of 2025.

== Owners ==
The team is owned by AVID Sports, a division of the Indian-Australian company AvidSys Group. Chennai Bulls is the only foreign-owned franchise in the Rugby Premier League.

== Squad ==
Chennai Bulls 2025 squad
Forwards: (Fiji) Joseva Talacolo; (Germany) Nikias Lohe; (India) Muhammed Jasim; (India) Akhil Anand	Hybrid: (Ireland) Terry Kennedy; (United Kingdom) Alex Davis (c); (Samoa) Va'a Apelu Maliko; (India) Aryan Dixit; (India) Gaurav Kumar	Backs: (Argentina) Joaquín Pellandini; (Fiji) Filipe Sauturaga; (India) Vallabh Patil; (India) Shanawaz Ahmed; (Germany) Haakon Oess; (India) Mohammed Ashique
(c) denotes the team captain. Source:

== Captaincy record ==
Player	Duration	Best result	Ref
(United Kingdom) Alex Davis	2025–present	Champions	

== Staff & personnel ==
=== Coaches ===
Coach	Duration	Best result	Ref
(England) Ben Gollings	2025–present	Champions	

== Kit manufacturers and sponsors ==
Year	Season	Kit manufacturer	Main sponsor	Back sponsor	Sleeve sponsor
2025	I	Struddys			Priority Pass
2026	II			Avid Health	

== Performance record ==
Season	Standing	Result	Matches	Won	Draw	Lost	Most tries	Most points
2025	2/6	Champions	12	8	1	3	Va'a Apelu Maliko	Va'a Apelu Maliko
Total	Champions x 1						Va'a Apelu Maliko	Va'a Apelu Maliko
