= Indian hockey team (disambiguation) =

India national hockey team may refer to:

- India men's national field hockey team
  - India men's national under-21 field hockey team
- India women's national field hockey team
  - India women's national under-21 field hockey team
- India men's national ice hockey team
  - India men's national junior ice hockey team
  - India men's national under-18 ice hockey team
- India women's national ice hockey team
- India women's national inline hockey team
- India national roller hockey team
