= Amasio Valence =

Amasio Valence Raoma
- Born: 12 May 1979 (age 47) Nadi, Fiji
- Height: 1.80 m (5 ft 11 in)
- Weight: 93 kg (205 lb)
- School: Sacred Heart College
- Occupation: Professional Sportsman

Rugby union career
- Position: Flyhalf
National sevens team
Years	Team	Comps
2001–2008	New Zealand	46
- Correct as of 02-01-2011
Medal record
Men's rugby sevens
Representing New Zealand
Commonwealth Games
Gold medal – first place	1998 Kuala Lumpur	Team competition
Gold medal – first place	2002 Manchester	Team competition
Gold medal – first place	2006 Melbourne	Team competition

Amasio Valence (born 12 May 1979) is a former rugby sevens player. He was born in Nadi, Fiji, but after he first made his break into professional rugby in 2000, he switched allegiances to New Zealand. He was hailed as one of the most promising players in the discipline in recent years. Valence is the only New Zealander to have won three gold medals in rugby sevens at the Commonwealth Games; in 1998, 2002 and 2006. He last played for New Zealand in 2008.

In 2005 he was named to the New Zealand squad for the Dubai sevens.

While Valence played rugby, his entire family enjoyed soccer, with his older brother, Nikola Raoma being picked for the national side of Fiji in 2002.
