= Aaron Cummings =

American rugby player (born 1997)

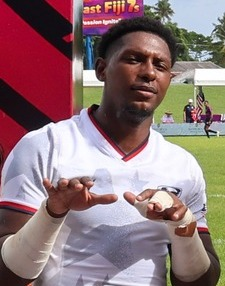
- Born: July 1, 1997 (age 29)
- Height: 6 ft 2 in (188 cm)
- Weight: 200 lb (90 kg)

Rugby union career
Senior career
Years	Team	Apps	(Points)
2025	Mumbai Dreamers		
2026	Kolkata Banga Tigers		
National sevens team
Years	Team		Comps
2022–Present	United States		

Aaron Cummings (born July 1, 1997) is an American rugby sevens player. He competed for the United States at the 2024 Summer Olympics in Paris.
