= Hyderabad Heroes =

Hyderabad based rugby sevens franchise team

- Full name: Hyderabad Heroes
- Nickname: The Heroes
- Founded: 2025
- Ground: Gachibowli Stadium
- CEO: Sanjay Jupudi; Srinath Chittoori
- Coach: (New Zealand) DJ Forbes
- Captain: (Spain) Manu Moreno
- Top scorer: (Fiji) Terio Tamani
- Most tries: (Fiji) Joji Nasova
- League: Rugby Premier League
- 2025: 3rd
1st kit	2nd kit

First match
- 24–14 vs Kalinga Black Tigers

Largest win
- 43–7 vs Bengaluru Bravehearts

Largest defeat
- 21–26 vs Bengaluru Bravehearts
- Current season

Hyderabad Heroes is a professional rugby sevens franchise team. Based in Hyderabad, Telangana, it competes in the Rugby Premier League. Manu Moreno is the captain while DJ Forbes is the coach.

== Owners ==
The team is owned by KLO Sports, which also owns Chennai Quick Guns in Ultimate Kho Kho.

== Squad ==
Hyderabad Heroes 2025 squad
Forwards: (Kenya) Kevin Wekesa; (Spain) Manu Moreno (c); (India) Sambit Pradhan	Hybrid: (India) Sumit Roy; (Samoa) Motu Opetai; (Germany) Wolfram Hacker	Backs: (Fiji) Joji Nasova; (Fiji) Terio Tamani; (Germany) Max Roddick; (India) Prince Khatri; (India) Javed Hussain; (India) Sukumar Hembrom; (Argentina) Lautaro Bazán; (India) Bhupinder Singh
(c) denotes the team captain. Source:

== Captaincy record ==
Player	Duration	Best Result	Ref
(Spain) Manu Moreno	2025–present	Third Place	

== Staff & personnel ==
=== Coaches ===
Coach	Duration	Best result	Ref
(New Zealand) DJ Forbes	2025–present	Third place	

== Kit manufacturers and sponsors ==
Year	Season	Kit manufacturer	Main sponsor	Back sponsor	Sleeve sponsor
2025	I	Omtex	Fluentgrid	Sprint Exports	Qentelli
2026	II	Omtex		MINISO	

== Performance record ==
Season	Standing	Result	Matches	Won	Draw	Lost	Most tries	Most points
2025	1/6	Third place	12	10	0	2	Joji Nasova	Terio Tamani
Total	0 titles						Joji Nasova	Terio Tamani
