= Bengaluru Bravehearts =

Bengaluru based rugby sevens franchise team

- Full name: Bengaluru Bravehearts
- Nickname: Bravehearts
- Founded: 2025
- Chairman: Ranjan Pai; Bhupinder Singh; Sanjith Shetty
- Coach: (Spain) Francisco Hernández
- Captain(s): (New Zealand) Scott Curry (Spain) Pol Pla
- Top scorer: (New Zealand) Akuila Rokolisoa
- Most tries: (Uganda) Philip Wokorach
- League: Rugby Premier League
- 2025: 4th
1st kit	2nd kit

First match
- 21–21 vs Delhi Redz

Largest win
- 26–0 vs Chennai Bulls

Largest defeat
- 7–43 vs Hyderabad Heroes
- Current season

Bengaluru Bravehearts is a professional rugby sevens franchise team. Based in Bengaluru, Karnataka, it competes in the Rugby Premier League. Scott Curry and Pol Pla are the captains while Francisco Hernández is the coach, as of 2025.

== Owners ==
The team is owned by three businessmen namely Ranjan Pai, the chairman of Manipal Education and Medical Group, Bhupinder Singh, the chairman of InCred and Sanjith Shetty chairman of Soham Infrastructure.

== Squad ==
Bengaluru Bravehearts 2025 squad
Forwards: (New Zealand) Scott Curry (c); (India) Arpan Chhetri; (India) Suresh Kumar; (India) Govind Gupta	Hybrid: (New Zealand) Tone Ng Shiu; (India) Mohit Khatri; (India) Karan Rajbhar; (India) Prashant Singh	Backs: (Spain) Pol Pla (c); (Fiji) Iowane Teba; (Canada) Liam Poulton; (Hong Kong) Mak Chung; (New Zealand) Akuila Rokolisoa
(c) denotes the team captain. Source:

== Captaincy record ==
Player	Duration	Best result	Ref
(New Zealand) Scott Curry	2025–present	4th place	
(Spain) Pol Pla	2025–present	4th place	

== Staff & personnel ==
=== Coaches ===
Coach	Duration	Best result	Ref
(Spain) Francisco Hernández	2025–present	4th place	

== Performance record ==
Season	Standing	Result	Matches	Won	Draw	Lost	Most tries	Most points
2025	3/6	4th	12	5	1	6	Philip Wokorach	Akuila Rokolisoa
Total	0 titles						Philip Wokorach	Akuila Rokolisoa

== Kit manufacturers and sponsors ==
Year	Season	Kit manufacturer	Main sponsor	Back sponsor	Sleeve sponsor
2025	I		Manipal Hospitals	InCred	Soham Energy
2026	II		Manipal Hospitals	InCred	Soham Energy

== See also ==
- Bangalore rugby football club
