= British Asian Rugby Association =

- Type: Sports federation
- Headquarters: England
- Chairman: (England) Nigel Goodings

The British Asian Rugby Association (BARA) is a rugby governing body, encompassing both rugby union and rugby league, for British players of Asian descent. It was spearheaded by Ikram Butt, a former England rugby league and Pakistan rugby union international.

There is a BARA team that takes part in various tournaments, such as the All India and South Asian rugby union championships, which they won in 2005. The team also provides a number of players to the Pakistan national rugby union team.
