= Bhupinder Singh =

Bhupinder Singh may refer to:

== Entertainment ==
- Bhupinder Singh (musician) (1940–2022), Indian singer and musician popularly known by his first name

== Politics ==
- Bhupinder Singh Brar (1926–1995), Indian politician from Punjab
- Bhupinder Singh Hooda (born 1947), Indian politician
- Bhupinder Singh Mann (born 1939), Indian activist and member of the Rajya Sabha
- Bhupinder Singh Thakur (1946–), former Indian army officer and Lieutenant Governor of The Andaman and Nicobar Islands
- Bhupinder Singh (politician) (born 1951), Indian politician from Odisha
- Bhupinder Singh of Patiala (1891–1938), Maharaja of Patiala

== Sports ==
- Bhupinder Singh (Indian cricketer) (born 1965), Punjab and Indian cricketer, aka Bhupinder Singh Snr
- Bhupinder Singh (cricketer, born 1970), Punjab cricketer, aka Bhupinder Singh Jnr
- Bhupinder Singh (New Zealand cricketer) (born 1986), New Zealand cricketer
- Bhupinder Singh (athlete) (born 1984), Indian athlete in 2005 Asian Athletics Championships

== See also ==
- Bhupinder, an Indian male name
- Singh, a title, middle name, or surname which originated in India
