= Lucas Friday =

English rugby union player (born 2006)

- Born: 13 July 2006 (age 20)
- Height: 1.75 m (5 ft 9 in)
- Weight: 73 kg (11 st 7 lb; 161 lb)
- School: Trinity School of John Whitgift
- Notable relative: Mike Friday

Rugby union career
- Position: Scrum half
- Current team: Harlequins
Senior career
Years	Team	Apps	(Points)
2024-	Harlequins	24	(0)
2024-	→ London Scottish (loan)	3	(10)
- Correct as of 28 October 2026
International career
Years	Team	Apps	(Points)
2023–2024	England U18		
2024–	England U20	17	(5)
- Correct as of 28 October 2026

Lucas Friday (born 13 July 2006) is an English professional rugby union player who plays as a scrum-half for Premiership Rugby side Harlequins. He is the son of Mike Friday.

== Club career ==
In November 2024, he made his debut for Harlequins in the Premiership Rugby Cup against London Scottish. He is also dual registered with London Scottish, featuring on loan for them throughout 2024. In January 2025, he made his Premiership debut for Harlequins at the age of 18 years-old, replacing Will Porter as they beat Newcastle Falcons 38–14 at Kingston Park. The following month, Friday suffered a knee injury that required surgery and he did not make his return for Harlequins until November 2025. Ahead of the 2026-27 season, he signed a new long term contract with Harlequins.

== International career ==
He represented England at U18 level. He played for the England national under-20 rugby union team which won the 2024 World Rugby U20 Championship. In January 2025, he made his tournament debut off the bench in the Six Nations Under 20s Championship in a 19–3 away win over Ireland, marking the first time they had beaten them at their home ground since 2017. He was then injured in a later game in the same tournament. He continued with the side and played for England U20 at the 2026 World Rugby Junior World Championship.

In November 2026, he was included in the England A squad to play against an Argentina XV in Bath.

== Personal life ==
He attended Trinity School of John Whitgift, where he captained the school first XV rugby side. He is the son of former Harlequins and Wasps player Mike Friday.

== Honours ==
England U20

- World Rugby Under 20 Championship
  - (gold) Champion (1): 2024
