= Delhi Hurricanes RFC =

(India) Delhi Hurricanes
- Full name: Delhi Hurricanes Rugby Football Club
- Nickname: The Hurricanes
- Location: New Delhi, India
- Ground(s): Vasant Kunj Sports Complex, B-7 Vasant Kunj 110070 Delhi (Capacity: 1,000)
- Chairman: (India) Arun Dagar
- Coach: (India) Kuldeep Singh Bist
- Captain: (India) Neeraj Khatri
- League: All India & South Asia Rugby Tournament
- 2024: Men's team 1st in XVs / 1st in 7s, Women's team 1st in XVs

Delhi Hurricanes Rugby Football Club is an Indian rugby union club based in New Delhi. Established in July 2004, the club is affiliated with the Delhi Rugby Association and operates under the Indian Rugby Football Union (IRFU). The Delhi Hurricanes compete in national rugby union competitions.

== History ==
Delhi Hurricanes Rugby Football Club was formed in July, 2004 and is affiliated with North India RFU, which is part of the Indian RFU.

Over time, it has emerged as one of the most successful rugby clubs in the country, with sustained participation and success in national-level tournaments.

After winning Division II Trophy, at the Callaghan Cup in 2009, the Delhi Hurricanes are improving rapidly, they reached the 5th place in the All India 2010, in year (2011), they lost against the winner of the competition in the semi-final, They came 2nd in 2014, 3rd in 2015, 2nd again in 2016, Women's team were runner up in the inaugural All India 15s tournament too played in Kolkata. In 2017, they made a history and became 1st club in India's history who won All India and South Asia Rugby Tournament in both Men's and Women's category in the same year.

== Infrastructure and academy ==
In July 2011, the Delhi Hurricanes inaugurated India’s first full-time dedicated rugby field at Vasant Kunj, New Delhi. The facility serves as the club’s primary training and competition venue.

The club operates a rugby development programme through the Hurricanes Rugby Academy, based at the same location. The academy focuses on long-term athlete development and has contributed a significant number of players to state and national teams.

== Competitive record ==
=== Rugby Union (15s) ===
Delhi Hurricanes have achieved multiple podium finishes in national rugby 15s competitions.

In 2017, they became the first club in Indian rugby history to win the national rugby 15s championship in both the men’s and women’s category.

=== Rugby Sevens ===
Delhi Hurricanes have won multiple invitational Rugby Sevens tournaments in India and have represented Indian club rugby overseas. In 2024, the club achieved international success by winning the plate competition at the Borneo 7s tournament.

== Player development and national representation ==
According to club records, over 50 players have represented national rugby teams across various formats. Players from the club have also represented multiple Indian states in national tournaments. A number of athletes associated with the club have held leadership roles at the national level, including captaincy positions. The club has produced multiple former national team captains in both the men’s and women’s categories.

== Achievements ==
=== Rugby 15s ===
- 2009: Division II Trophy (Callaghan Cup)
- 2016: Women’s Rugby 15s league finalists
- 2017: All India 15s Championship winners (men’s, women’s)
- 2018, 2019: Men’s team back-to-back titles
- 2023, 2024: All India 15s men's titles, women's 3rd and 2nd place

=== Rugby 7s ===
- 2011: All India 7s Tournament winners
- 2024: Plate winners, Borneo 7s

== See also ==
- Delhi Redz
