= Kolkata Banga Tigers =

Kolkata based rugby sevens franchise team

- Full name: Kolkata Banga Tigers
- Nickname: Banga Tigers
- Founded: 2025 as Kalinga Black Tigers; 2026 as Kolkata Banga Tigers
- Location: Kolkata
- CEO: Karanpal Singh
- Coach: (England) Mike Friday
- Captain(s): (South Africa) Ricardo Duarttee(M) (South Africa) Shiniqwa Lamprecht(W)
- Top scorer: (United States) Lucas Lacamp
- Most tries: (Australia) Maurice Longbottom
- League: Rugby Premier League
- 2025: 5th
1st kit	2nd kit

First match
- 14–24 vs Hyderabad Heroes

Largest win
- 19–15 vs Delhi Redz

Largest defeat
- 12–43 vs Hyderabad Heroes

Official website
- www.kolkatabangatigers.in
- Current season

Kolkata Banga Tigers, previously Kalinga Black Tigers is a professional rugby sevens franchise team. Based in Kolkata, West Bengal, it competes in the Rugby Premier League. Harry McNulty was the first captain, while Mike Friday was the first coach.

== Owners ==
Former logo (2025).

The team is owned by venture capital firm Hunch Ventures.

== Squad ==
Kalinga Black Tigers 2025 squad
Forwards: (Canada) Kyle Tremblay; (Ireland) Harry McNulty (c); (India) Ajay Deswal; (India) Pardeep Singh; (India) Deepraj Rajabhosale	Hybrid: (Canada) James Thiel	Backs: (Australia) Maurice Longbottom; (United States) Lucas Lacamp; (Canada) Ethan Turner; (South Africa) Rosko Specman; (United States) Perry Baker; (India) Asis Sabar; (India) Arjun Mahato
(c) denotes the team captain. Source:

== Captaincy record ==
Player	Duration	Best result	Ref
(Republic of Ireland) Harry McNulty	2025–present	5th	

== Staff & personnel ==
=== Coaches ===
Coach	Duration	Best result	Ref
(England) Mike Friday	2025–present	5th	

== Kit manufacturers and sponsors ==
Year	Season	Kit manufacturer	Main sponsor	Back sponsor	Sleeve sponsor
2025	I	Vaquita	Goodtimes	Jamie Oliver's Pizzeria	Mercantile Ports & Logistics
2026	II	Omtex	Jamie Oliver's Pizzeria	Hunch	Red FM

== Performance record ==
Season	Standing	Result	Matches	Won	Draw	Lost	Most tries	Most points
2025	5/6	5th	10	2	2	6	Lucas Lacamp	Maurice Longbottom
2026								
Total	0 titles						Lucas Lacamp	Maurice Longbottom
