= Mumbai Dreamers =

Mumbai based rugby sevens franchise team

- Full name: Mumbai Dreamers
- Nickname: Dreamers
- Founded: 2025
- Ground: Mumbai Football Arena
- CEO: Harsh Jain
- Coach: (Australia) Tim Walsh
- Captain: (India) Akash Balmiki
- Top scorer: (Australia) James Turner
- Most tries: (Australia) James Turner
- League: Rugby Premier League
- 2025: 6th
Team kit

First match
- 5–24 vs Chennai Bulls

Largest win
- None

Largest defeat
- 5–24 vs Chennai Bulls

Official website
- www.mumbaidreamers.com
- Current season

Mumbai Dreamers is a professional rugby sevens franchise team. Based in Mumbai, Maharashtra, it competes in the Rugby Premier League. Akash Balmiki is the captain while Tim Walsh is the coach.

== Owners ==
The team is owned by Dream Sports, the parent company of fantasy sports platform Dream11. Dream11 chief marketing officer Vikrant Mudaliar revealed that the platform, which has 240 million users, will launch a rugby fantasy sports category to coincide with the Rugby Premier League.

== Squad ==
Mumbai Dreamers 2025 squad
Forwards: (United States) Aaron Cummings; (Canada) Elias Hancock; (Canada) Rhys James; (Canada) Briar Barron; (India) Neeraj Khatri; (India) Devendra Padir	Hybrid: (Australia) Henry Hutchison; (India) Nayan Kumar	Backs: (Fiji) Waisea Nacuqu; (Australia) James Turner; (India) Akash Balmiki (c); (India) Ganesh Majhi; (Fiji) Jerry Tuwai
(c) denotes the team captain. Source:

== Captaincy record ==
Player	Duration	Best result	Ref
(India) Akash Balmiki	2025–present	6th	

== Staff & personnel ==
=== Coaches ===
Coach	Duration	Best result	Ref
(Australia) Tim Walsh	2025–present	6th	

== Kit manufacturers and sponsors ==
Year	Season	Kit manufacturer	Main sponsor	Back sponsor	Sleeve sponsor
2025	I	SUPA	Dream11	Route Mobile	CRED
2026	II	Omtex			

== Performance record ==
Season	Standing	Result	Matches	Won	Draw	Lost	Most tries	Most points
2025	6/6	6th	10	1	2	7	James Turner	James Turner
Total	0 titles						James Turner	James Turner
