= James Turner (rugby union) =

Australian rugby union player

- Born: 29 August 1998 (age 28) Sydney, New South Wales, Australia
- Height: 1.92 m (6 ft 4 in)
- Weight: 102 kg (225 lb; 16 st 1 lb)
- School: Newington College

Rugby union career
- Position: Wing
Senior career
Years	Team	Apps	(Points)
2017–2020	West Harbour	28	(100)
2019	NSW Country Eagles	3	(0)
2021–2022	Northern Suburbs	16	(40)
2021–2022	Waratahs	4	(0)
2025–	Mumbai Dreamers		
- Correct as of 1 December 2023
National sevens team
Years	Team		Comps
2022–	Australia		10
- Correct as of 1 December 2023

James Turner (born 29 August 1998) is an Australian professional rugby union player who plays as a back for the Australia national sevens team.

== Club career ==
Turner attended his father’s Alma Mater Newington College. His playing position is wing. He was named in the Waratahs squad for Round 2 of the Super Rugby Trans-Tasman competition. He previously represented NSW Country Eagles in the 2019 National Rugby Championship.

Turner competed for Australia Sevens at the 2022 Rugby World Cup Sevens in Cape Town.

In 2024, He was named in Australia's squad for the 2024 Summer Olympics in Paris.
