= New Zealand national rugby sevens team =

Sports team representing New Zealand

New Zealand
- Nickname: All Blacks Sevens
- Emblem: Silver Fern
- Union: New Zealand Rugby Union
- Head coach: Tomasi Cama
- Top scorer: Tomasi Cama (2,028)
- Top try scorer: Tim Mikkelson (240)
- Home stadium: Waikato Stadium
| First colours | Second colours |

First international
- New Zealand 18–22 Ireland (7 April 1973)

Rugby World Cup Sevens
- Appearances: 8 (first in 1993)
- Best result: Champions (2001, 2013, 2018)
- Website: https://www.allblacks.com/teams/all-blacks-sevens/

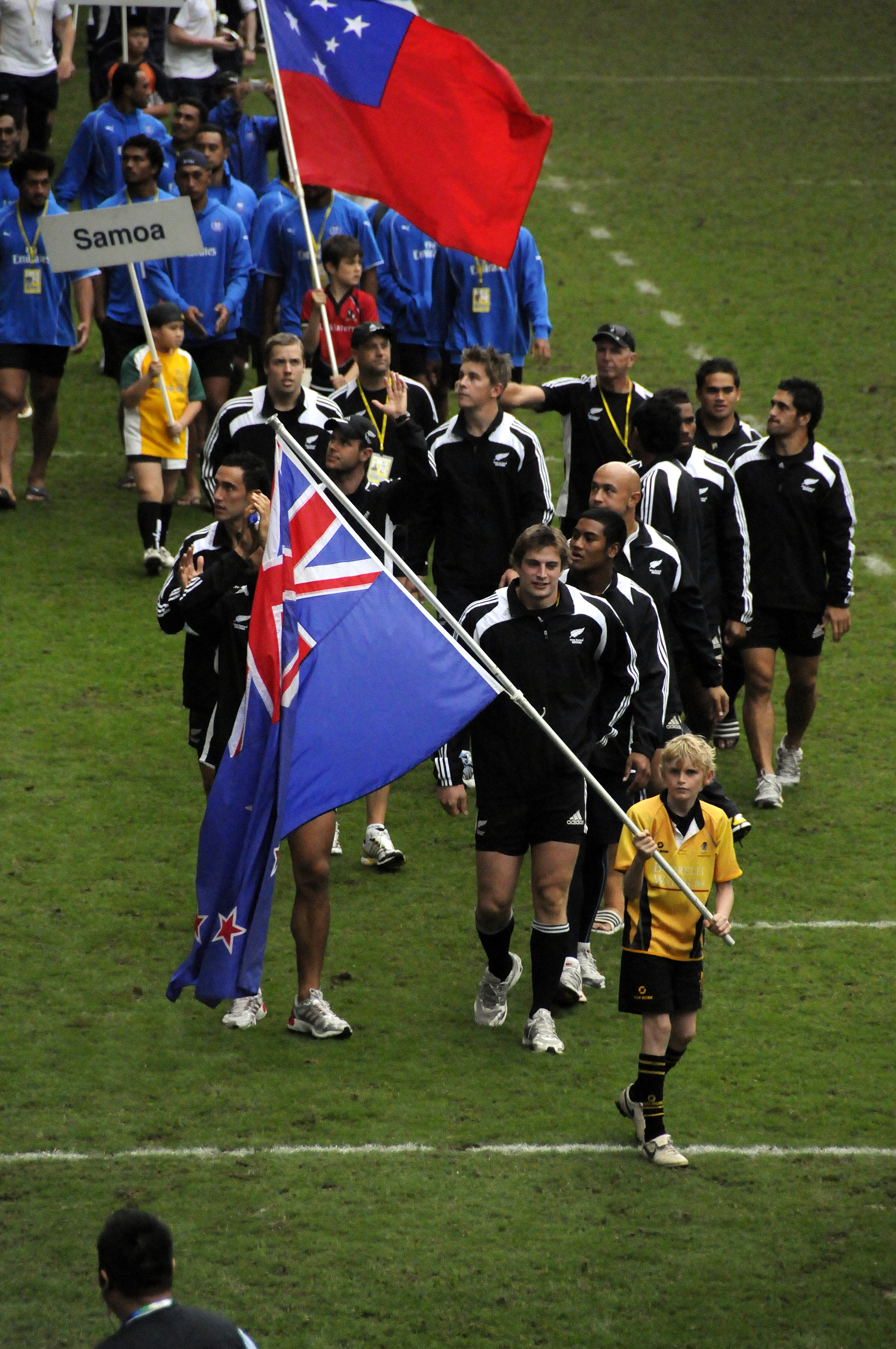
New Zealand national rugby sevens team at the 2009 Hong Kong Sevens

The New Zealand national rugby sevens team competes in the World Rugby Sevens Series, Rugby World Cup Sevens, Summer Olympic Games and the Commonwealth Games. They have won a record 14 World Rugby Sevens Series titles.

The team played for the first time at the 1973 International Seven-A-Side Tournament.

== History ==
=== World Sevens Series ===
The All Blacks Sevens have won 14 of the 26 World Rugby Sevens Series, and have been the most successful team in the history of the world series. They won the first six series between 1999–2004, before placing 4th in the 2005 series, and then later winning back to back series again in the 2006–2007 seasons. In 2008, the team placed 4th for the second time, and were runners-up for the first ever time in 2009. In the years of 2010–2013, the All Blacks Sevens had another period of success by winning all 4 of those series, before going onto have 5 straight seasons without winning a series between 2014–2018, which saw them come in 3rd place a total of 4 times and placed 4th once, which is also the third time that they have placed 4th in a world series. In 2019, the team won its first series again since 2013, and it was followed by a Covid-19 disrupted 2020–21 season, which was then followed by a disappointing 2021–22 series, that saw them come in 8th place, which was the lowest that the team has ever placed in any of the World Sevens Series. The team won its 14th World Series title on the 13th of May 2023, wrapping up the 2022–23 season, after beating France in the semi finals of the Toulouse tournament, and wrapping up the series due to a points difference gap being greater than the 2nd placed Argentina side. The All Blacks Sevens finished in 4th place in the 2023–24 season after the Madrid, Spain Grand Final (Winner takes all) tournament.

=== Summer Olympic Games ===
The All Blacks Sevens have played in 3 tournaments at the Summer Olympics, but have failed to obtain a Gold Medal from all 3 competitions. In 2016, they were eliminated in the quarter-finals by Fiji before finishing in 5th place by beating Argentina (17–14) in the 5th place final. In 2020, they improved from the previous tournament and made it to the Grand Final but they were beaten by Fiji once again by (12–27). This caused them to finish the tournament in 2nd place after losing the final. In 2024, The All Blacks Sevens failed again to obtain a Gold Medal at the Olympics after losing to South Africa in the quarter-finals (7–14), and finishing in 5th place after defeating Ireland (17–7) in the 5th place final.

=== Rugby World Cup Sevens ===
New Zealand have won 3 Sevens Rugby World Cups. Their first appearance was in the 1993 tournament which was held in Scotland. They were knocked out in the quarter-finals by the eventual winners England (12–21) before finishing in 7th place. In 1997, they placed 3rd after they were beaten in the semi-finals by South Africa (7–31). In 2001, they won their first World Cup by beating Australia (31–12), and would also make the final again in 2005 but went on to lose to Fiji (19–29). In 2009, they lost to Wales in the quarter-finals (14–15) and would finish in 5th place. They then would go on to win the next two World Cups in 2013 and 2018 by beating England in both tournaments (33–0) and (33–12), to become the first team in history to go back to back in consecutive tournaments. In 2022, they lost to Fiji in the final once again by (12–27), and finished runners-up for the second time in their World Cup history.

=== Commonwealth Games ===
New Zealand have found the most success in the Commonwealth Games Sevens Series by winning 5 out of the 7 Tournaments. They won in 1998 by beating Fiji in the final (21–12), won in 2002 by winning against Fiji again (33–15), beat England in the 2006 Final (29–21), before beating Australia in the final in 2010 (24–17) and would go on to beat Fiji for the 3rd consecutive time in the final (14–0). In 2014, they were runners-up after losing to England (12–17) in the final and came in 3rd place after losing to Fiji (14–19) in the semi-finals in the 2022 tournament.

=== Oceania Sevens ===
The All Blacks sevens have been the Oceania Sevens Champions twice. In 2022 after having the best round-robin record of (5–1), they secured the title. In 2023, they retained their title after defeating Samoa (24–19) in the Final. They have been runners-up 4 times, the first being in 2014 by losing to Fiji in the final (5–21), the second time was in 2017 when they lost to Fiji again in the final (0–26), the third time was in 2018, when they lost to Fiji again for the 3rd straight final (12–17), and the 4th time would be by having the 2nd best round-robin record in 2021 (4–2), behind Fiji who had a better record (6–0), and they would also finish the 2019 competition in 7th place.

== Records ==
=== World Sevens Series ===
New Zealand have won the World Rugby Sevens Series a record 14 times. New Zealand were particularly dominant in the early years of the Series, winning the first six series.

| Season | Position |
|---|---|
| 1999–2000 | 1st |
| 2000–01 | 1st |
| 2001–02 | 1st |
| 2002–03 | 1st |
| 2003–04 | 1st |
| 2004–05 | 1st |
| 2005–06 | 4th |
| 2006–07 | 1st |
| 2007–08 | 1st |
| 2008–09 | 4th |
| 2009–10 | 2nd |
| 2010–11 | 1st |
| 2011–12 | 1st |
| 2012–13 | 1st |
| 2013–14 | 1st |
| 2014–15 | 3rd |
| 2015–16 | 3rd |
| 2016–17 | 4th |
| 2017–18 | 3rd |
| 2018–19 | 3rd |
| 2019–20 | 1st |
| 2021 | DNP |
| 2021–22 | 8th |
| 2022–23 | 1st |
| 2023–24 | 4th |
| Total | 14 Titles |

=== Summer Olympic Games ===
New Zealand have competed in three Summer Olympics Sevens Tournaments. Their best result is achieving a Silver medal in the 2020 tournament.

Olympic Games record
| Year | Round | Position | Pld | W | L | D |
|---|---|---|---|---|---|---|
| (Brazil) 2016 | Quarter-finals | 5th | 6 | 3 | 3 | 0 |
| (Japan) 2020 | Final | 2nd | 6 | 5 | 1 | 0 |
| (France) 2024 | Quarter-finals | 5th | 6 | 5 | 1 | 0 |
| Total | Final | 3/3 | 18 | 13 | 5 | 0 |

Olympic Games History
| 2016 | Pool stage | New Zealand 12 – 14 Japan | Loss |
| 2016 | Pool stage | New Zealand 28 – 5 Kenya | Win |
| 2016 | Pool stage | New Zealand 19 – 21 Great Britain | Loss |
| 2016 | Quarter-finals | New Zealand 7 – 12 Fiji | Loss |
| 2016 | 5–8th place playoff Semi-final | New Zealand 24 – 19 France | Win |
| 2016 | 5–8th place playoff Fifth place | New Zealand 17 – 14 Argentina | Win |
| 2020 | Pool stage | New Zealand 50 – 5 South Korea | Win |
| 2020 | Pool stage | New Zealand 35 – 14 Argentina | Win |
| 2020 | Pool stage | New Zealand 14 – 12 Australia | Win |
| 2020 | Quarter-finals | New Zealand 21 – 10 Canada | Win |
| 2020 | Semi-finals | New Zealand 29 – 7 Great Britain | Win |
| 2020 | Final | New Zealand 12 – 27 Fiji | Loss |
| 2024 | Pool stage | New Zealand 40 – 12 Japan | Win |
| 2024 | Pool stage | New Zealand 17 – 5 South Africa | Win |
| 2024 | Pool stage | New Zealand 14 – 12 Ireland | Win |
| 2024 | Quarter-finals | New Zealand 7 – 14 South Africa | Loss |
| 2024 | 5–8th place playoff semi-final | New Zealand 17 – 12 Argentina | Win |
| 2024 | 5–8th place playoff Fifth place | New Zealand 17 – 7 Ireland | Win |

=== Rugby World Cup Sevens ===
New Zealand is tied with Fiji for the most Rugby Sevens World Cups with each team having 3 titles.

| Year | Round | Position | Pld | W | L | D |
|---|---|---|---|---|---|---|
| (Scotland) 1993 | Quarterfinals | 7th | 8 | 6 | 2 | 0 |
| (Hong Kong) 1997 | Semifinals | 3rd | 4 | 3 | 1 | 0 |
| (Argentina) 2001 | Final | 1st | 8 | 8 | 0 | 0 |
| (Hong Kong) 2005 | Final | 2nd | 8 | 7 | 1 | 0 |
| (United Arab Emirates) 2009 | Quarterfinals | 5th | 4 | 3 | 1 | 0 |
| (Russia) 2013 | Final | 1st | 6 | 6 | 0 | 0 |
| (United States) 2018 | Final | 1st | 4 | 4 | 0 | 0 |
| (South Africa) 2022 | Final | 2nd | 4 | 3 | 1 | 0 |
| Total | 3 Titles | 8/8 | 46 | 40 | 6 | 0 |

=== Commonwealth Games ===
New Zealand is the most successful rugby sevens team at the Commonwealth Games. They have won five of the seven Commonwealth Games tournaments so far, and have finished second once. The team have only lost 2 matches at the Commonwealth Games, losing to South Africa in the final of the 2014 tournament and losing to Fiji in the semi-finals in the 2022 tournament.

| Year | Round | Position | Pld | W | L | D |
|---|---|---|---|---|---|---|
| (Malaysia) 1998 | Finals | 1st | 6 | 6 | 0 | 0 |
| (England) 2002 | Finals | 1st | 6 | 6 | 0 | 0 |
| (Australia) 2006 | Finals | 1st | 6 | 6 | 0 | 0 |
| (India) 2010 | Finals | 1st | 6 | 6 | 0 | 0 |
| (Scotland) 2014 | Finals | 2nd | 6 | 5 | 1 | 0 |
| (Australia) 2018 | Finals | 1st | 5 | 5 | 0 | 0 |
| (England) 2022 | Bronze Final | 3rd | 6 | 5 | 1 | 0 |
| Total | 5 Titles | 7/7 | 41 | 39 | 2 | 0 |

=== Oceania Sevens ===
New Zealand have won the Oceania Sevens twice, while they have been runners-up 4 times and also came in 7th place in the 2019 tournament.

| Year | Round | Position |
|---|---|---|
| (Samoa) 2008 | Did not compete | |
| (French Polynesia) 2009 | Did not compete | |
| (Australia) 2010 | Did not compete | |
| (Samoa) 2011 | Did not compete | |
| (Australia) 2012 | Did not compete | |
| (Fiji) 2013 | Did not compete | |
| (Australia) 2014 | Finals | 2nd |
| (New Zealand) 2015 | Did not compete | |
| (Fiji) 2016 | Did not compete | |
| (Fiji) 2017 | Finals | 2nd |
| (Fiji) 2018 | Finals | 2nd |
| (Fiji) 2019 | 7th Place Final | 7th |
| (Australia) 2021 | Round-robin | 2nd |
| (New Zealand) 2022 | Round-robin | 1st |
| (Australia) 2023 | Finals | 1st |
| Total | 2 Titles | 7/15 |

== Players ==
=== Current Squad ===
On 20 June, the squad was named for the 2024 Paris Olympic Sevens tournament in France.

Travelling Reserves: Tim Mikkelson, Sione Molia, and Joe Webber.

Squad updated to: 20 June 2024

| Player | Position | Date of birth (age) | Caps | Club/province |
|---|---|---|---|---|
| Scott Curry | Forward | 17 May 1988 (age 37) | 299 | Unattached |
| Brady Rush | Forward | 24 April 1999 (age 26) | 118 | Northland |
| Leroy Carter | Back | 24 February 1999 (age 26) | 109 | Bay of Plenty |
| Tepaea Cook-Savage | Back | 8 February 2001 (age 24) | 70 | Waikato |
| Moses Leo | Back | 11 August 1997 (age 28) | 79 | North Harbour |
| Akuila Rokolisoa | Back | 26 July 1995 (age 30) | 167 | Unattached |
| Ngarohi McGarvey-Black | Back | 20 May 1996 (age 29) | 145 | Bay of Plenty |
| Regan Ware | Back | 7 August 1994 (age 31) | 280 | Unattached |
| Dylan Collier | Back | 27 April 1991 (age 34) | 306 | Waikato |
| Andrew Knewstubb | Back | 14 September 1995 (age 30) | 161 | Unattached |
| Tone Ng Shiu | Back | 26 May 1994 (age 31) | 195 | Unattached |
| Fehi Fineanganofo | Back | 31 August 2002 (age 23) | 46 | Bay of Plenty |

== Records and statistics ==
=== Player records ===
The following shows leading career New Zealand players based on performance in the World Rugby Sevens Series. Players in bold are still active.

Tries scored
| No. | Player | Tries |
|---|---|---|
| 1 | **Tim Mikkelson** | 240 |
| 2 | DJ Forbes | 153 |
| 3 | Tomasi Cama | 145 |
| 4 | **Scott Curry** | 130 |
| 4 | Kurt Baker | 130 |

Points scored
| No. | Player | Points |
|---|---|---|
| 1 | Tomasi Cama | 2,028 |
| 2 | **Tim Mikkelson** | 1,220 |
| 3 | Amasio Valence | 1,132 |
| 4 | Kurt Baker | 865 |
| 5 | **Akuila Rokolisoa** | 821 |

Matches played
| No. | Player | Matches |
|---|---|---|
| 1 | **Tim Mikkelson** | 488 |
| 2 | DJ Forbes | 450 |
| 3 | Sam Dickson | 351 |
| 4 | Lote Raikabula | 299 |
| 4 | **Scott Curry** | 299 |

=== Awards ===
Several New Zealand players have won or been nominated for the World Rugby Sevens Player of the Year award.

World Rugby Player of the Year
| Player | Wins | Nominations |
|---|---|---|
| Tim Mikkelson | 1 (2013) | 3 (2011, 2013, 2014) |
| Tomasi Cama Jr. | 1 (2012) | 2 (2011, 2012) |
| DJ Forbes | 1 (2008) | 2 (2007, 2008) |
| Orene Ai'i | 1 (2005) | 1 (2005) |
| Afeleke Pelenise | 1 (2007) | 1 (2007) |
| Leroy Carter | 0 | 1 (2023) |
| Scott Curry | 0 | 1 (2021) |
| Frank Halai | 0 | 1 (2012) |
| Akuila Rokolisoa | 0 | 1 (2023) |
| Amasio Valence | 0 | 1 (2005) |

== Coaches ==
- Junior Tomasi Cama (head coach)
- Euan Mackintosh (assistant coach)

=== Past coaches ===
| Name | Years |
|---|---|
| Gordon Tietjens | 1994–2016 |

== See also ==
- List of New Zealand rugby sevens internationals
- All Blacks
