= Akuila Rokolisoa =

New Zealand rugby sevens player

- Rokolisoa representing New Zealand during the USA Sevens
- Born: 27 June 1995 (age 31) Tavua, Fiji
- Height: 1.78 m (5 ft 10 in)
- Weight: 82 kg (181 lb)
- School: James Cook High School

Rugby union career
- Position(s): Wing, First five-eighth
Senior career
Years	Team	Apps	(Points)
2025–	Bengaluru Bravehearts		
International career
Years	Team	Apps	(Points)
2018–	New Zealand 7s	180	(843)
- Correct as of 21 July 2024
Medal record
Men's rugby sevens
Representing New Zealand
Commonwealth Games
Bronze medal – third place	2022 Birmingham	Team competition
Rugby World Cup Sevens
Gold medal – first place	2018 San Francisco	Team competition
Silver medal – second place	2022 Cape Town	Team competition

Akuila Rokolisoa (born 27 June 1995) is a professional rugby union player who plays as a back. Born in Fiji, he represents New Zealand at international level after qualifying on residency grounds.

== International career ==
Rokolisoa made his All Blacks Sevens debut at the 2018 Hong Kong Sevens.

Rokolisoa was named in the All Blacks Sevens squad for the 2018 Rugby World Cup Sevens in San Francisco where he scored a crucial try in the final to see New Zealand take Gold. He was also named in the 2022 Commonwealth Games in Birmingham. He won a bronze medal at the event. He featured for New Zealand at the 2022 Rugby World Cup Sevens in Cape Town. He won a silver medal after his side lost to Fiji in the gold medal final.

He is the current leading point scorer in the 2022-23 HSBC World Rugby Sevens Series. He competed for New Zealand at the 2024 Summer Olympics in Paris.
