= Henry Hutchison =

Australian rugby union player

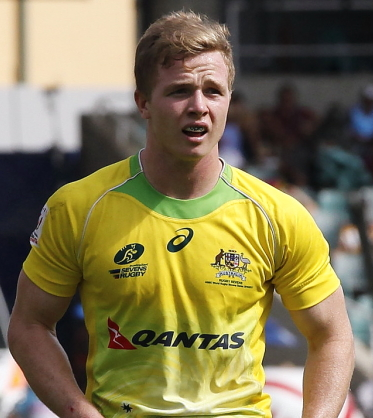
- Born: 12 February 1997 (age 29)
- Height: 1.75 m (5 ft 9 in)
- Weight: 86 kg (190 lb)
- School: St Kevin's College, Melbourne; Saint Ignatius' College, Riverview

Rugby union career
Amateur team(s)
| Years | Team | Apps | (Points) |
| 2014– | Randwick | | |
Senior career
| Years | Team | Apps | (Points) |
| 2017–2019 | Melbourne Rising | 5 | (5) |
| 2025 | Mumbai Dreamers | | |
| 2026 | Bengaluru Bravehearts | | |
Super Rugby
| Years | Team | Apps | (Points) |
| 2018 | Rebels | 0 | (0) |
National sevens team
| Years | Team | | Comps |
| 2016– | Australia 7s | | |

Henry Hutchison (born 12 February 1997) is a professional rugby union player who represents Australia in rugby sevens. Born in Sydney, NSW and playing for Randwick at club level, he debuted for Australia in December 2015.

== Career ==
Hutchison grew up in Sydney and Melbourne. He attended St Kevin's College, Melbourne and later Saint Ignatius' College, Riverview. He joined the Australian Sevens program in August 2015 after impressing for his local club side Randwick in Sydney's Shute Shield competition.

Hutchison was due to represent Australia at the Commonwealth Youth Games in Samoa in September 2015 but such was the impression he made that he was promoted to the senior squad for the pre-season tour to New Zealand. He was part of the 12-man squad that helped Australia qualify for the 2016 Summer Olympics in Rio at the Oceania Sevens in November 2015. He was also nominated rookie of the year in the 2015/16 World Rugby Sevens Series. He competed at the 2016 Summer Olympics.

Hutchison was also a member of the Australian men's rugby seven's squad at the Tokyo 2020 Olympics. The team came third in their pool round and then lost to Fiji 19-nil in the quarterfinal.

Representative honours include Australian Men's Sevens, Australian Under 20s and the Australian Schoolboys. He competed for Australia at the 2022 Rugby World Cup Sevens in Cape Town.

He was named in the Australian sevens team for the 2024 Summer Olympics in Paris.

== Super Rugby statistics ==
As of 15 July 2018

| Season | Team | Games | Starts | Sub | Mins | Tries | Cons | Pens | Drops | Points | Yel | Red |
|---|---|---|---|---|---|---|---|---|---|---|---|---|
| 2018 | Rebels | 0 | 0 | 0 | 0 | 0 | 0 | 0 | 0 | 0 | 0 | 0 |
| Total | | 0 | 0 | 0 | 0 | 0 | 0 | 0 | 0 | 0 | 0 | 0 |
