= Maurice Longbottom =

Australian rugby union player

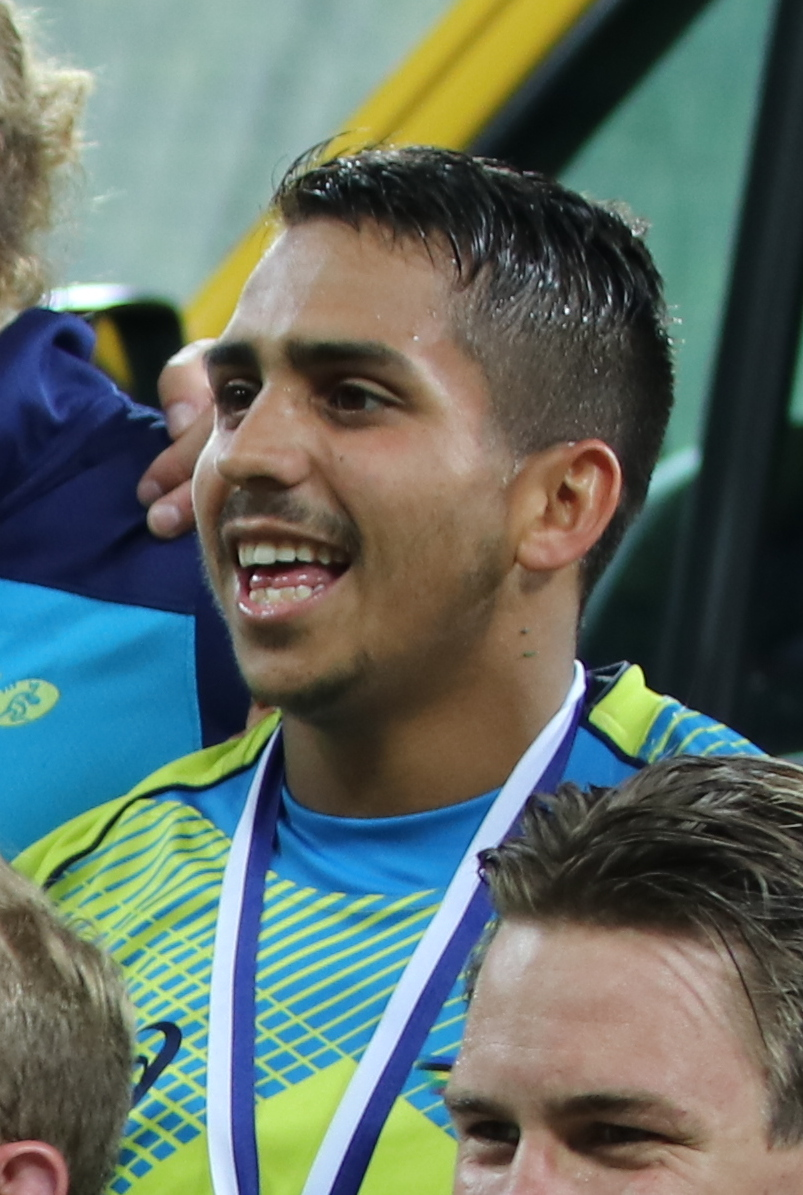
- Longbottom with Australia at the Oktoberfest Sevens
- Born: 30 January 1995 (age 31) La Perouse, New South Wales, Australia
- Height: 1.68 m (5 ft 6 in)
- Weight: 75 kg (165 lb)
- School: Matraville Sports High School

Rugby union career
- Position(s): Scrum-half, Fullback
Senior career
Years	Team	Apps	(Points)
2020	Randwick	8	(25)
2025	Kalinga Black Tigers	0	(0)
2026	Hyderabad Heroes		
- Correct as of 1 December 2023
National sevens team
Years	Team		Comps
2017–	Australia		45
- Correct as of 1 December 2023

Maurice Longbottom (born 30 January 1995) is an Australian professional rugby union player who plays as a back for the Australia national sevens team.

== International career ==
Longbottom played some matches for the South Sydney Rabbitohs junior squad, but was described as "too small for senior footy". Longbottom's performance in the Oktoberfest Sevens drew the attention of Australia rugby sevens team coach Andy Friend.

Longbottom was a member of the Australian men's rugby sevens squad at the Tokyo 2020 Olympics. The team came third in their pool round and then lost to Fiji 19-0 in the quarterfinal. He competed for Australia at the 2022 Rugby World Cup Sevens in Cape Town.

In 2024, He was named in Australia's squad for the Summer Olympics in Paris.

== Personal life ==
Longbottom is a Dharawal. He once expressed that he wants to inspire the next generation of Indigenous athletes.
