= Ben Gollings =

English rugby union player

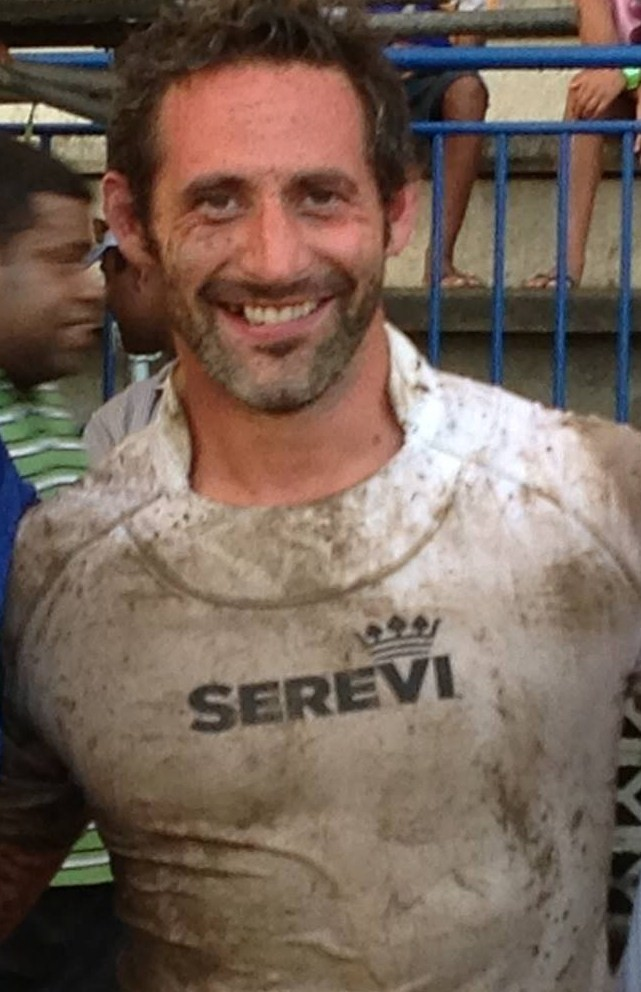
- Gollings in Fiji (2013)
- Born: 13 May 1980 (age 46) Launceston, Cornwall, England
- Height: 5 ft 9 in (1.75 m)
- Weight: 80 kg (12 st 8 lb; 176 lb)
- University: Brunel University

Rugby union career
- Position: Flyhalf
Senior career
Years	Team	Apps	(Points)
1999–2003	Harlequins		
2003–2004	Newcastle		
2004	Worcester		
2004–2006	Sunnybank		
2006–2007	Tasman		
2007–2008	Toyota Shokki		
2008–2011	Gold Coast Breakers		
2011–2012	Rugby Lions	25	(112)
National sevens team
Years	Team		Comps
2000–2011	England 7s		70
Coaching career
- Years: Team
- 2025-: Chennai Bulls
- 2025-: India 7s
Medal record
Men's rugby sevens
As player
Representing England
Commonwealth Games
Silver medal – second place	2006 Melbourne	Team competition
As coach
Representing India
Asia Rugby Sevens Trophy
Silver medal – second place	2025 Oman

Benjamin Phillip Gollings (born 13 May 1980) is an English former rugby union player who most recently worked as a rugby coach for Fiji sevens team. Gollings is best known for his time with the England national rugby sevens team. He is the career leader in points scored on the World Rugby Sevens Series with 2,652 points.

== Youth and early career ==
Gollings was born in Launceston, Cornwall, England. Gollings was educated at Castle Court School and Canford School. In 1997 he led Canford to success at The National Schools 7's. In 2000, he was selected for England in the Students' Rugby World Cup while at Brunel University.

== Rugby sevens career ==
Gollings continued to remain a regular part of the England Sevens set-up. Gollings was the leading scorer three times on the IRB Sevens Series—343 points in 2005–06, 260 points in 2008–09, and 332 points in 2009–10. His accomplishments include several records in the IRB Sevens World Series. Gollings became the first rugby sevens player to score over 2,000 points in his career during 2009. Gollings finished his career with 2,652 points. On 21 June 2011, it was announced that Gollings' contract with the RFU would not be renewed, ending his international sevens career after 70 tournaments.

== Rugby fifteens ==
Gollings played for Bournemouth, Gloucester, Bath Development U19 side, Harlequins, Newcastle Falcons, Worcester, Doncaster Knights and Sunnybank. Whilst at Newcastle he was a replacement as they won the 2004 Anglo-Welsh Cup final. Three years earlier in 2001 he was on the losing side in the same competition when Newcastle beat his old club Harlequins. In 2006, he signed to play in the New Zealand National Provincial Championship for Tasman. From June 2007 Gollings joined Toyota Shokki Rugby.

Gollings joined semi-professional club Rugby Lions as a player and backs coach. Gollings won every game with the Lions in his first season, amassing over 100 points for the club himself. He was quoted in the Rugby Advertiser as saying "It's been a special season and I don't think it has fully sunk in with people how phenomenal it is to win every league game. Most of us won't experience that again." However, due to the financial crisis that hit the club in the summer of 2012, Gollings left the Lions in July.

== Coach ==
In late 2012, Gollings took up a sevens coaching role in Sri Lanka. He then relocated to Seattle in the United States to take up a major role with Serevi Rugby, a rugby training and development programme founded by Fiji player, Waisale Serevi.
