= Patrick Odongo =

Kenyan rugby sevens player

- Born: 20 March 2002 (age 24)
- Height: 180 cm (5 ft 11 in)
- Weight: 85 kg (187 lb; 13 st 5 lb)

Rugby union career
Senior career
Years	Team	Apps	(Points)
2025–	Delhi Redz		
National sevens team
Years	Team		Comps
2023–Present	Kenya		

Patrick Odongo Okong'o (born 20 March 2002) is a Kenyan rugby sevens player. He competed for Kenya at the 2024 Summer Olympics in Paris.
