= Terio Tamani =

Fiji rugby sevens player (b. 1994)

Terio Veilawa Tamani
- Born: 6 July 1994 (age 32) Ravitaki, Kadavu Province, Fiji
- Height: 1.70 m (5 ft 7 in)
- Weight: 70 kg (154 lb)

Rugby union career
- Position: Scrum half
- Current team: Suva Rugby
2025–	Hyderabad Heroes	
National sevens team
Years	Team	Comps
2018-	Fiji 7s	
Medal record
Men's rugby sevens
Representing Fiji
Olympic Games
Silver medal – second place	2024 Paris	Team competition

Terio Veilawa Tamani (born 6 July 1994) is a Fijian rugby union player who plays at scrum half for Fiji national rugby sevens team.

== Biography ==
He is from the village of Ravitaki on the island of Kadavu. He plays domestically for Suva in the Skipper Cup. He made his debut for the Fiji national rugby sevens team during the Singapore 7s in 2018.

A halfback, his diminutive stature and fluid play has drawn comparisons with Waisale Serevi.

He was selected for the 2024 Paris Olympics. Having continued with the team for the 2025-26 SVNS, he was named in the Team of the Season in June 2026.
