= Joseva Talacolo =

Fijian rugby player (born 1997)

- Born: 1 April 1997 (age 29) Suva, Fiji
- Height: 199 cm (6 ft 6 in)
- Weight: 99 kg (218 lb)

Rugby union career
- Position: Inside centre
Amateur team(s)
Years	Team	Apps	(Points)
- Police Blue
Senior career
Years	Team	Apps	(Points)
2025–	Chennai Bulls		
National sevens team
Years	Team		Comps
2021–	Fiji		
Medal record
Men's rugby sevens
Representing Fiji
Olympic Games
Silver medal – second place	2024 Paris	Team competition

Joseva Talacolo (/ˌtæləˈðɒloʊ, -θɒl-/ TAL-ə-THOL-oh, born 1 April 1997) is a Fijian rugby union player for the Fiji national rugby sevens team. He was selected as part of the Fijian squad for the 2024 Summer Olympics.

== Biography ==
Talacolo was born on 1 April 1997 in Suva, Fiji. The eldest of eight children, he grew up in the Naqarawai village in Namosi Province. He said that he decided to play rugby union to support his family, after "seeing how my parents struggle to put food in front of us, put a roof over our heads and provide for us." His father enrolled him in the Lelean Memorial School Rugby Academy and Talacolo rose through the ranks.

Talacolo, an inside centre, became an "influential player on the local [rugby] 7s scene" with the Police Blue club. He was described by The Fiji Times as "the go-to man in the air for the Police Blue ... His prowess in winning restarts and line-outs have been applauded by fans. Furthermore, his aerial ball skills and handling of the ball in one hand is phenomenal."

Talacolo narrowly missed selection to the Fiji national rugby sevens team for the 2020 Summer Olympics, being a travelling reserve. He later debuted for the national team at the 2021 Dubai Sevens, held in November and December 2021. He missed out on selection to the 2022 Commonwealth Games due to an illness, but returned in time for the 2022 Rugby World Cup Sevens and helped Fiji to the Melrose Cup title. He competed for Fiji at the 2023 Dubai Sevens and scored the winning try in the opener against the United States.

Talacolo married Emi Kalougata in January 2024. He was selected for the Fiji squad at the 2024 Summer Olympics which won the silver medal.
