= Manu Moreno =

Spanish rugby player (born 1998)

- Full name: Manuel Moreno
- Born: 2 September 1998 (age 28) Seville, Spain
- Height: 1.95 m (6 ft 5 in)
- Weight: 87 kg (192 lb; 13 st 10 lb)

Rugby union career
Senior career
Years	Team	Apps	(Points)
2019–2022	Real Ciencias RC		
2023	Monaco Rugby Sevens		
2025-	Hyderabad Heroes		
National sevens team
Years	Team		Comps
2021-	Spain 7s		
Medal record
Men's rugby sevens
Representing Spain
European Games
Bronze medal – third place	2023 Kraków–Małopolska	Team competition

Manuel Moreno (born 2 September 1998) is a Spanish rugby sevens player who plays for the Spanish national rugby sevens team.

== Early life ==
He was brought up in Seville, and played numerous sports as a youngster including tennis, karate and football. He tried rugby union after his older brother Gabi played rugby for Ciencias and had earned a High Performance scholarship after finishing second with his team in the Spanish Championship.

== Career ==
He began playing rugby union for Ciencias Sevilla CR in Seville. He was subsequently called-up to join the Spain national rugby sevens team in the summer of 2020.

He scored the opening try as Spain beat New Zealand at the South Africa Sevens in Cape Town in December 2022. In May 2023, Moreno was chosen among the 14 best rugby sevens players at the HSBC World Rugby Sevens Series in Toulouse. He played for Spain at the 2023 European Games.

In May 2025, he was in the Dream Team of the Year for the 2024-25 SVNS. He continued with the Spanish Sevens team and was a try scorer in Spain‘a victory over New Zealand Sevens at the 2026 Canada Sevens, during the 2025-26 SVNS series, also scoring a try in the semi-final against Fiji as Spain finished runner-up to South Africa in the tournament. He was also a try scorer against Australia as Spain reached the semi-finals at the 2026 Hong Kong Sevens.

In July 2026, Moreno was one of the first players announced for the Ultimate Sevens Championship, prior to the inaugural competition launch later that year.

== Personal life ==
He studied medicine alongside his rugby career. He is a keen football fan and a supporter of Real Betis. He has also been employed as a model.
