= Mike Friday =

English rugby union player & coach

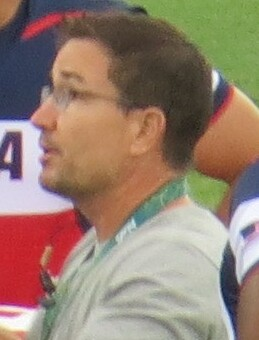
- Born: Michael John Friday; April 25, 1972 (age 54) Chichester, England
- Height: 1.73 m (5 ft 8 in)
- Weight: 78 kg (172 lb; 12 st 4 lb)
- Notable relative: Lucas Friday

Rugby union career
- Position: Scrum-half
Senior career
| Years | Team | Apps | (Points) |
| – | London Wasps | | |
| – | Blackheath FC | | |
| 1997–2000 | London Wasps | | |
| 2000–2001 | Harlequins | | |
| 2001–2002 | London Wasps | | |
National sevens team
| Years | Team | | Comps |
| 1998–2001 | England 7s | | |
Coaching career
- Years: Team
- 2004–2006: England 7s
- 2012–2013: Kenya 7s
- 2014–2015: London Scottish
- 2014–2024: USA 7s
- 2025-: Kalinga Black Tigers

Michael John "Mike" Friday (born April 25, 1972) has been the head coach of the United States national rugby sevens team since summer 2014. Friday succeeded the previous coach, Matt Hawkins, following the 2013–14 World Series. On 30 September 2024 USA Rugby announced that Friday would be replaced by Simon Amor. He is the father of Lucas Friday.

Friday had previously served as head coach for the national rugby sevens teams of England from 2004 to 2006, and Kenya from 2012 to 2013.

== Playing career ==
Friday was born in Chichester, England. Friday played professional rugby 15s for various teams, including the London Wasps and Harlequins. He captained the England national rugby sevens team, including at the 1998 Commonwealth Games and the 2001 Rugby World Cup Sevens. While at Wasps he helped them win the Anglo-Welsh Cup in 1999 and 2000; he was a replacement in both finals.

== England (2001–2006) ==
Friday served for three years as assistant coach to Joe Lydon of the England national rugby sevens team. Friday then became the head coach of the England 7s team near the end of the 2003/2004 season. He resigned from the role at the end of 2006 to take up a business role in the City of London.

In June 2010 Friday announced his involvement in RuckingBall.com, an online community for the development of school-boy rugby, coaches and parents.

== Kenya (2012–13) ==
Mike Friday was appointed as coach of the Kenya national rugby sevens team on 25 May 2012 by the Kenya Rugby Football Union. He led the Kenya 7s team to one of its best performances in Wellington New Zealand, on 2 February 2013, to the final versus England which Kenya lost 19-24 during extra time. Friday also led Kenya to a 5th-place finish in the 2013 London Sevens. Friday led the Kenyan sevens team to a series high of 99 points in the 2012–13 IRB Sevens World Series.

Friday was reportedly fired by the Director of National Squads and Elite Performance, Philip Jalang'o, barely a day after the end of the 2012–13 season. This decision was however denied by the chair of the Kenya Rugby Union Mwangi Muthee, with Philip Jalang'o losing his job as a result.

== United States (2014–2024) ==
Friday was appointed head coach of the United States national sevens team by USA Rugby CEO Nigel Melville in July 2014. Melville was Friday's coach when Friday played at London Wasps. Under Friday’s leadership, the U.S. qualified for the Olympics in 2016, 2020, and 2024.

Initially Friday concurrently retained his role as director of rugby for the England-based London Scottish professional rugby team. As of May 14, 2015 it was announced that Friday was leaving the London Scottish role.

On 8 August 2024 USA Rugby announced that Friday had decided to step away as U.S.A. men's sevens coach.

== Coaching results ==
The following table shows the results of national teams coached by Mike Friday in the World Rugby Sevens Series.

| Season | Team | Finish |
|---|---|---|
| 2004–05 | England 7s | 3rd |
| 2005–06 | England 7s | 2nd |
| 2012–13 | Kenya 7s | 5th |
| 2014–15 | United States 7s | 6th |
| 2015–16 | United States 7s | 6th |
| 2016–17 | United States 7s | 5th |
| 2017–18 | United States 7s | 6th |
| 2018–19 | United States 7s | 2nd |
| 2019–20 | United States 7s | 7th |
| 2021 | United States 7s | 5th |
| 2022–23 | United States 7s | 10th |
| 2023–24 | United States 7s | 8th |

== Personal life ==
He is the father of Harlequins scrum half Lucas Friday.
