= Alex Davis (rugby union) =

England rugby union player

- Full name: Alexander Davis
- Born: 3 October 1992 (age 34) Gloucester, England
- Height: 1.86 m (6 ft 1 in)
- Weight: 92 kg (203 lb)

Rugby union career
Senior career
Years	Team	Apps	(Points)
2025–	Chennai Bulls		
National sevens teams
Years	Team		Comps
2014–2023	England 7s		
2021-	Great Britain		1
- Correct as of 26 July 2021
Medal record
Men's rugby sevens
Representing Great Britain
European Games
Silver medal – second place	2023 Kraków–Małopolska	Team competition

Alexander "Alex" Davis (born 3 October 1992) is an English rugby union player. He plays for the Great Britain national rugby sevens team having previously represented the England national rugby sevens team.

== Early and personal life ==
Davis was born in Gloucester but grew up in Bristol, where he attended Queen Elizabeth's Hospital school in Clifton. He was also a keen cricketer in his youth, combining cricket with rugby union. He played for England in rugby union at under-16 and under-18 level, as well as representing Gloucestershire at cricket. He later attended Loughborough University. He returned to his old school in Bristol and coached rugby union during the COVID-19 pandemic in 2021 after the dissolution of the England rugby sevens programme.

== Rugby career ==
Davis made his debut for the England national rugby sevens team in 2014, making his World Series Sevens debut at the Australia Sevens that year. He scored his first international try at the South Africa Sevens in Cape Town in 2015. He featured at the 2014 Commonwealth Games.

He was selected for the 2016 Olympics in Brazil but was ruled out from appearing after suffering an ankle injury in training at the pre-Games camp. Two years later, he was named as captain for the England squad that won the bronze medal at the 2018 Commonwealth Games in Gold Coast, Australia. He was then also part of the team that won the silver medal at the 2018 Rugby World Cup Sevens in San Francisco in the United States. He was part of the Team GB squad that placed fourth overall at the delayed 2020 Olympic Games in Tokyo, Japan in 2021. He was named captain of the England squad for the 2022 Rugby World Cup Sevens held in Cape Town, South Africa in September 2022.

He played as part of the GB sevens team at the men’s Olympic qualification repechage tournament in Monaco in June 2024.
