= India women's national inline hockey team =

India women's national inline hockey team is the national team for India. The team competed in the 2013 Women's World Inline Hockey Championships.
