= Tone Ng Shiu =

New Zealand rugby union player

- Born: 26 May 1994 (age 32) Napier, New Zealand
- Height: 1.89 m (6 ft 2 in)
- Weight: 98 kg (216 lb)
- School: Botany Downs Secondary College

Rugby union career
- Position: Flanker
Senior career
Years	Team	Apps	(Points)
2015, 2017, 2025	Tasman	10	(10)
2025	Bengaluru Bravehearts		
- Correct as of 11 October 2025
International career
Years	Team	Apps	(Points)
2017–	New Zealand 7s	210	(252)
- Correct as of 11 October 2025
Medal record
Men's rugby sevens
Representing New Zealand
Summer Olympics
Silver medal – second place	2020 Tokyo	Team competition
Commonwealth Games
Bronze medal – third place	2022 Birmingham	Team competition
Rugby World Cup Sevens
Silver medal – second place	2022 Cape Town	Team competition

Tone Ng Shiu (born 26 May 1994) is a New Zealand rugby union player who plays as a forward for the New Zealand national sevens team. He also played for Tasman in the Bunnings NPC.

== International career ==
Ng Shiu made his international debut for New Zealand Sevens in 2017. He was named the 2019 New Zealand Rugby Sevens Player of the Year. He was named in the New Zealand squad for the Rugby sevens at the 2020 Summer Olympics.

Ng Shiu was part of the All Blacks Sevens squad that won a bronze medal at the 2022 Commonwealth Games in Birmingham. He was selected for the team again for the 2022 Rugby World Cup Sevens in Cape Town. He won a silver medal after his side lost to Fiji in the gold medal final.

He represented New Zealand at the 2024 Summer Olympics in Paris. He continued to play for New Zealand in the 2024-25 SVNS series. He continued with New Zealand Sevens for the 2025-26 season, and captained the side to victory in his 50th international sevens tournament at the 2025 Dubai Sevens.

== Personal life ==
He and his partner, Dhys Faleafaga, have twins, Kamari and Kaziel.
