= Joji Nasova =

Fiji rugby sevens player (born 2000)

- Born: 9 June 2000 (age 26)
- Height: 185 cm (6 ft 1 in)
- Weight: 92 kg (203 lb; 14 st 7 lb)

Rugby union career
- Position: Wing
- Current team: Fijian Drua
Senior career
Years	Team	Apps	(Points)
2026	Fijian Drua	0	(0)
2026	Newcastle Red Bulls	0	(0)
International career
Years	Team	Apps	(Points)
2025-	Fiji	2	(15)
National sevens team
Years	Team		Comps
2023-2025	Fiji		
Medal record
Men's rugby sevens
Representing Fiji
Olympic Games
Silver medal – second place	2024 Paris	Team

Joji Nasova (born 9 June 2000) is a Fijian rugby sevens player. He was selected for the 2024 Summer Olympics. He was part of the Fijian team which reached the finals of the men's rugby sevens tournament.

He signed for the Fijian Drua after moving to fifteens rugby and made his international debut for Fiji in the 2025 World Rugby Pacific Nations Cup semi final round against Canada and scoring a try, then in the final he started on the left wing scoring 2 tries against Japan and won Player of the Match.

On 26 January 2026, Nasova would move to England to sign for Newcastle Red Bulls in the Premiership Rugby on a two-year contract from the 2026–27 season.
