= Pol Pla =

Spanish rugby player (born 1993)

Pol Pla Vegué
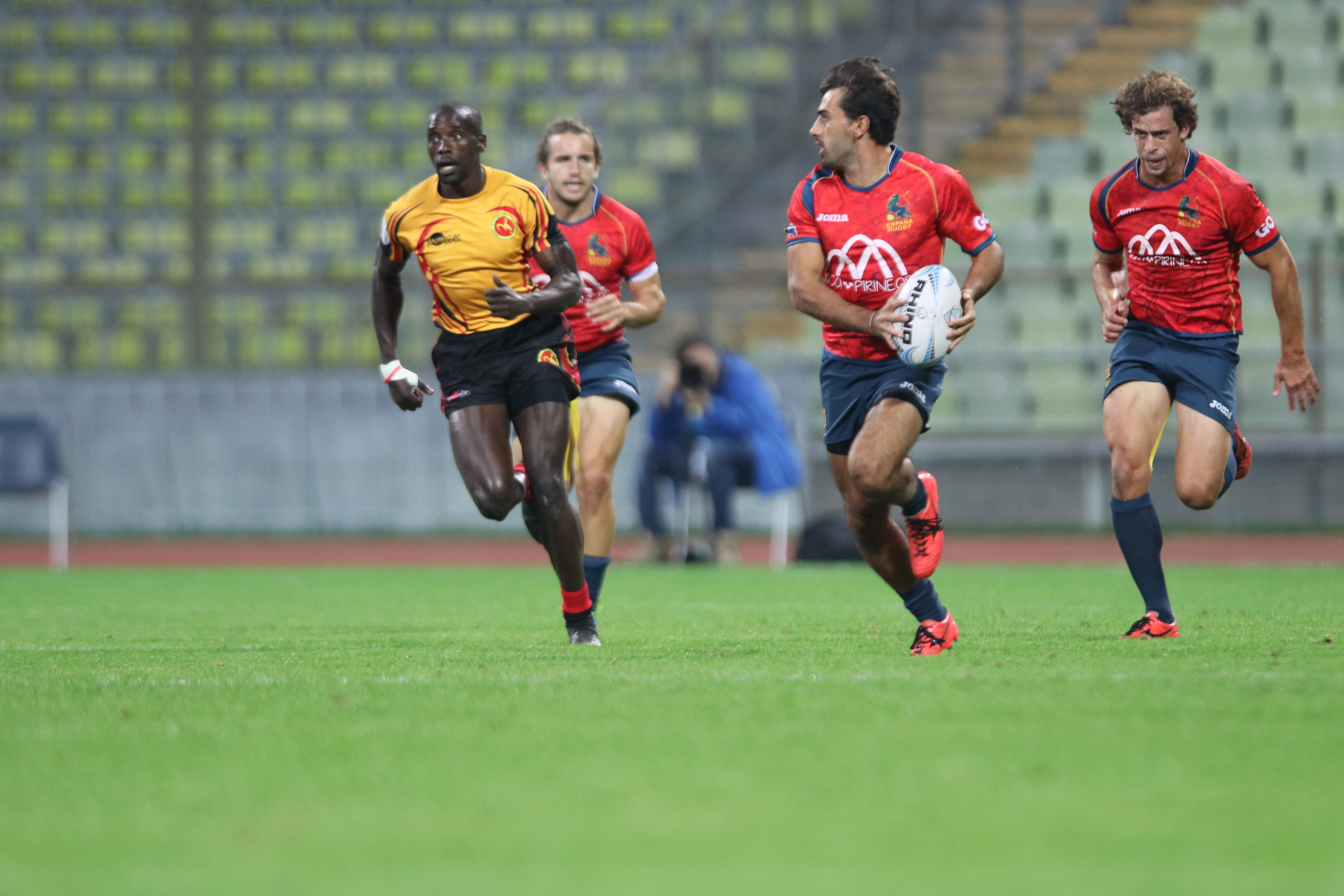
- Pol Pla running with the ball in the Oktoberfest 7s tournament.
- Full name: Pol Pla Vegué
- Born: 18 February 1993 (age 33) Barcelona, Spain
- Height: 1.74 m (5 ft 8 1/2 in)
- Weight: 76 kg (168 lb; 12 st 0 lb)
- Notable relative: Bárbara Pla (sister)

Rugby union career
Senior career
Years	Team	Apps	(Points)
2012-2015	Sant Cugat CR		
2015-2019	FC Barcelona Rugby		
2023-2024	Monaco Rugby Sevens		
2025	Bengaluru Bravehearts		
2026	Delhi Redz		
National sevens team
Years	Team		Comps
2015-	Spain 7s		256 (550)
Medal record
Men's rugby sevens
Representing Spain
European Games
Bronze medal – third place	2023 Kraków–Małopolska	Team

Pol Pla Vegué (born 18 February 1993) is a Spanish rugby sevens player who plays for and captains the Spanish national rugby sevens team. He was part of the squad at the 2016 Summer Olympics, as well as the squad that won the last qualifying spot for the Olympics in Monaco.

He achieved core team status with the national team for the world rugby seven series in 2017 and to the present, after winning the Hong Kong qualifying tournament. He is the Spanish national team player with the most number of tries in the world rugby seven series of history.

Pla's older sister, Bárbara also competed at the Olympics for the Spanish women's sevens team.

In August 2025, he was selected by the northern Catalan club USA Perpignan to participate in the 2025 season of Supersevens, a rugby sevens tournament.

As of August 30, 2025, Pla has played 256 games for Spain. He has scored 110 tries for a total of 550 points.
