= Scott Curry (rugby union) =

New Zealand rugby union player

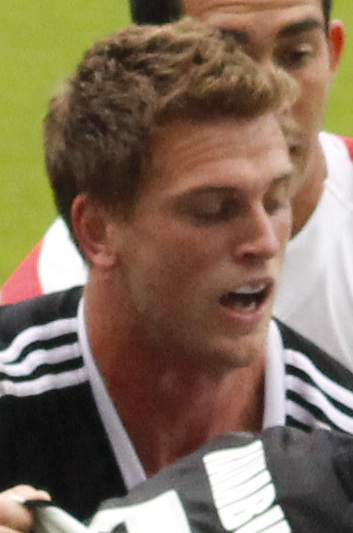
- Curry representing New Zealand during the Gold Coast Sevens
- Born: 17 May 1988 (age 38) Rotorua, New Zealand
- Height: 1.93 m (6 ft 4 in)
- Weight: 100 kg (220 lb)
- School: Reporoa College

Rugby union career
- Position(s): Flanker, Centre
Senior career
Years	Team	Apps	(Points)
2020	Bay of Plenty	10	(5)
2022	Munakata Sanix Blues	7	(5)
2025–	Bengaluru Bravehearts		
- Correct as of 21 July 2024
International career
Years	Team	Apps	(Points)
2011–	New Zealand 7s	321	(686)
- Correct as of 21 July 2024
Medal record
Men's rugby sevens
Representing New Zealand
Summer Olympics
Silver medal – second place	2020 Tokyo	Team competition
Commonwealth Games
Bronze medal – third place	2022 Birmingham	Team competition
Gold medal – first place	2018 Gold Coast	Team competition
Silver medal – second place	2014 Glasgow	Team competition
Rugby World Cup Sevens
Gold medal – first place	2018 San Francisco	Team competition
Silver medal – second place	2022 Cape Town	Team competition

Scott Curry (born 17 May 1988) is a New Zealand professional rugby union player who plays as a forward for the New Zealand national sevens team.

== International career ==
He made his debut at the 2010 Dubai Sevens. He made his debut appearance at the Olympics representing New Zealand at the 2016 Summer Olympics.

Curry was ruled out of the All Blacks Sevens squad to the 2013 Rugby World Cup Sevens in Russia due to an injury he sustained during training. He was included in the squad for the 2014 Commonwealth Games in Glasgow. However, New Zealand lost to South Africa 12–17 in the final.

Curry captained the All Blacks Sevens side at the 2015 USA Sevens after DJ Forbes was injured in Wellington. He captained the rugby sevens side at the 2016 Summer Olympics. He won gold medal with the New Zealand team in the men's rugby sevens tournament during the 2018 Commonwealth Games. He captained the New Zealand side which triumphed at the 2018 Rugby World Cup Sevens tournament by defeating England 33–12 in the final.

He was named as the captain of the New Zealand squad to compete at the 2020 Summer Olympics in the men's rugby sevens tournament. He was also subsequently part of the New Zealand side which claimed silver medal after losing to Fiji 27–12 at the 2020 Summer Olympics. It was also New Zealand's first ever Olympic medal in the men's rugby sevens. Prior to the start of the delayed 2020 Olympics, he announced that he would consider on retiring from the sport after the Olympics.

He is also a trained science teacher.

Curry was part of the All Blacks Sevens squad that won a bronze medal at the 2022 Commonwealth Games in Birmingham. He was selected for the All Blacks Sevens squad for the 2022 Rugby World Cup Sevens in Cape Town. He won a silver medal after his side lost to Fiji in the gold medal final.

In 2024, He competed for New Zealand at the Paris Olympics.
