= Junior Tomasi Cama =

Tomasi Cama
- Born: 11 November 1980 (age 46) Suva, Fiji
- Height: 176 cm (5 ft 9 in)
- Weight: 85 kg (187 lb; 13 st 5 lb)
- Notable relative: Tomasi Cama (Father)

Rugby union career
- Position(s): Halfback, first five-eighth, centre, wing
Provincial / State sides
Years	Team	Apps	(Points)
2003–13	Manawatu	71	(114)
2004	Wanganui	3	(25)
- Correct as of 14 October 2013
National sevens team
Years	Team		Comps
2005–2015	New Zealand		128
Coaching career
- Years: Team
- 2023–: New Zealand 7s
- 2025-: Delhi Redz
Medal record
Men's rugby sevens
Representing New Zealand
Commonwealth Games
Gold medal – first place	2010 Delhi	Team competition

Tomasi Cama (born 11 November 1980) is a New Zealand former rugby union player. He played for Manawatu in the Air New Zealand Cup, and the New Zealand Sevens team. Cama won the 2012 World Rugby Sevens Player of the Year Award.

He is currently the Head Coach of the All Blacks Sevens. He is the son of former Fiji sevens player Tomasi Cama.

== Playing career ==
=== Manawatu ===
Cama moved to New Zealand to pursue a rugby career in 1999. He started out in the Manawatu Colts in 2001 having a strong season and earning a spot in the Manawatu Development Squad in 2002. He played for the Manawatu Development Squad again in 2003. 2004 saw a change of colours when he wore the Wanganui colours in the NPC. After one season with Wanganui he went back to play for Manawatu. In 2006 Cama focused on his Air New Zealand Cup season for Manawatu and had a strong season.

In 2011 he celebrated his 50th match for Manawatu.

=== All Blacks Sevens ===
In 2005 he was picked for the New Zealand Sevens team. Cama was back for the sevens, 2008 saw him selected once again for the sevens squad.

Cama was part of the team that won gold in the 2010 Commonwealth Games and the 2013 Rugby World Cup Sevens. He remains the All Blacks Sevens all-time leading point scorer.

Cama won the 2012 World Rugby Sevens Player of the Year Award. In January 2014 he missed the Las Vegas sevens due to injury.

In 2015, Cama retired from playing rugby and joined the All Blacks Sevens management.

== Coaching ==
In 2015, Cama took up a job with the New Zealand Sevens programme as a scout to identify talent in both men's and women's teams and as team analyst. Cama was also the coach of the Manawatu men's sevens team.

In 2017 Cama took on a full-time role as Assistant Coach for the All Blacks Sevens. As assistant coach he has helped lead the team to win the 2018 Rugby World Cup Sevens, 2018 Commonwealth Games gold, bronze and the 2022 Commonwealth Games and a silver medal at the 2020 Tokyo Olympics.

At the 2020 Hamilton Sevens, Cama celebrated being part of his 100th World Sevens Series tournament as a player & coach.

In August 2023, Cama was appointed the head coach of the All Blacks Sevens for the 2024 season.
