= Francisco Hernández (rugby union) =

- Born: Francisco Hernández Jiménez; 28 October 1988 (age 38) Granada, Spain
- Height: 1.73 m (5 ft 8 in)
- Weight: 78 kg (172 lb; 12 st 4 lb)
- Occupation: Electrical engineer

Rugby union career
Amateur team(s)
| Years | Team | Apps | (Points) |
- C. R. Motril
Senior career
| Years | Team | Apps | (Points) |
- University of Granada
- Ciencias Sevilla CR
| 2016-17 | CR Cisneros | | |
National sevens team
| Years | Team | | Comps |
| 2013-20 | Spain | | 295 |
Coaching career
- Years: Team
- 2023-: Spain 7s
- 2025-: Bengaluru Bravehearts

Francisco Hernández (born 28 October 1988) is a Spanish former rugby sevens player and coach. He is currently the coach of Spain national rugby sevens team and Bengaluru Bravehearts.

He was named in the Spanish squad for the 2016 Men's Rugby Sevens Final Olympic Qualification Tournament in Monaco, which they eventually lost. He was later named in the team to the 2016 Summer Olympics.

In 2020 he retired from the practice of sport and in 2023 he was appointed coach of the Spanish rugby 7 team, replacing Pablo Feijoo.

In April 2025, he was appointed coach of the Bengaluru Bravehearts of the Rugby Premier League 2025.
