= Bhupinder Singh (Indian cricketer) =

Indian cricketer (born 1965)

Bhupinder Singh (Sr.)
Personal information
- Born: 1 April 1965 (age 61); Punjab, India
- Batting: Right-handed
- Bowling: Right-arm fast-medium
- Source: ESPNcricinfo, 6 March 2006

Bhupinder Singh (born 1 April 1965) is a former Indian cricketer. He played domestic cricket for Punjab and played two One Day Internationals for India in 1994.

Bhupinder Singh was a member of selection committee, a post to which he was nominated in 2005, and which he retained in 2006.

Bhupinder Singh is also an administrator in the Punjab Cricket Association.
