= Delhi Redz =

Delhi based rugby sevens franchise team

- Full name: Delhi Redz
- Nickname: Redz
- Founded: 2025
- Location: New Delhi
- Region: India
- Chairman: Siddharth Menda; Mihir Menda
- Coach: (New Zealand) Tomasi Cama
- Captain: (Argentina) Matías Osadczuk
- Top scorer: (Kenya) Patrick Odongo
- Most tries: (Kenya) Patrick Odongo
- League: Rugby Premier League
- 2025: Runners up
Team kit

First match
- 21–21 vs Bengaluru Bravehearts

Largest win
- 20–7 vs Mumbai Dreamers

Largest defeat
- 0–42 vs Chennai Bulls

Official website
- www.delhiredz.com
- Current season

Delhi Redz is a professional rugby sevens franchise team. Based in New Delhi, the team competes in the Rugby Premier League. Matías Osadczuk is the captain while Tomasi Cama is the coach, as of the 2025 season.

== Owners ==
The team is owned by RMZ Corp. Sidharth Menda and Mihir Menda, members of the supervisory board led the announcement.

== Squad ==
Delhi Redz 2025 squad
| Forwards: (Argentina) Matteo Graziano; (Argentina) Matías Osadczuk (c); (Hong Kong) Michael Coverdale | Hybrid: (India) Raj Kumar; (Germany) Robin Plumpe | Backs: (Spain) Alejandro Laforga (es); (Kenya) Patrick Odongo; (Ireland) Jordan Conroy; (Germany) Moritz Noll; (India) Rajdeep Saha; (India) Deepak Punia; (India) Sunil Chawan; (India) Mohit Tushir |
(c) denotes the team captain. Source:

== Captaincy record ==
| Player | Duration | Best Result | Ref |
|---|---|---|---|
| (Argentina) Matías Osadczuk | 2025–present | Runners Up | |

== Staff & personnel ==
=== Coaches ===
| Coach | Duration | Best result | Ref |
|---|---|---|---|
| (New Zealand) Tomasi Cama | 2025–present | Runners up | |

== Kit manufacturers and sponsors ==
| Year | Season | Kit manufacturer | Main sponsor | Back sponsor | Sleeve sponsor |
|---|---|---|---|---|---|
| 2025 | I | SIX5SIX | Livspace | Wybor | Red FM |
| 2026 | II | Omtex | Tata Projects | Simple | Arbiter |

== Performance record ==
| Season | Standing | Result | Matches | Won | Draw | Lost | Most tries | Most points |
|---|---|---|---|---|---|---|---|---|
| 2025 | 4/6 | Runners up | 12 | 4 | 2 | 6 | Patrick Odongo | Patrick Odongo |
| Total | Runners up x 1 | | | | | | Patrick Odongo | Patrick Odongo |

== See also ==
- Delhi Hurricanes RFC
