= Tim Walsh (rugby union) =

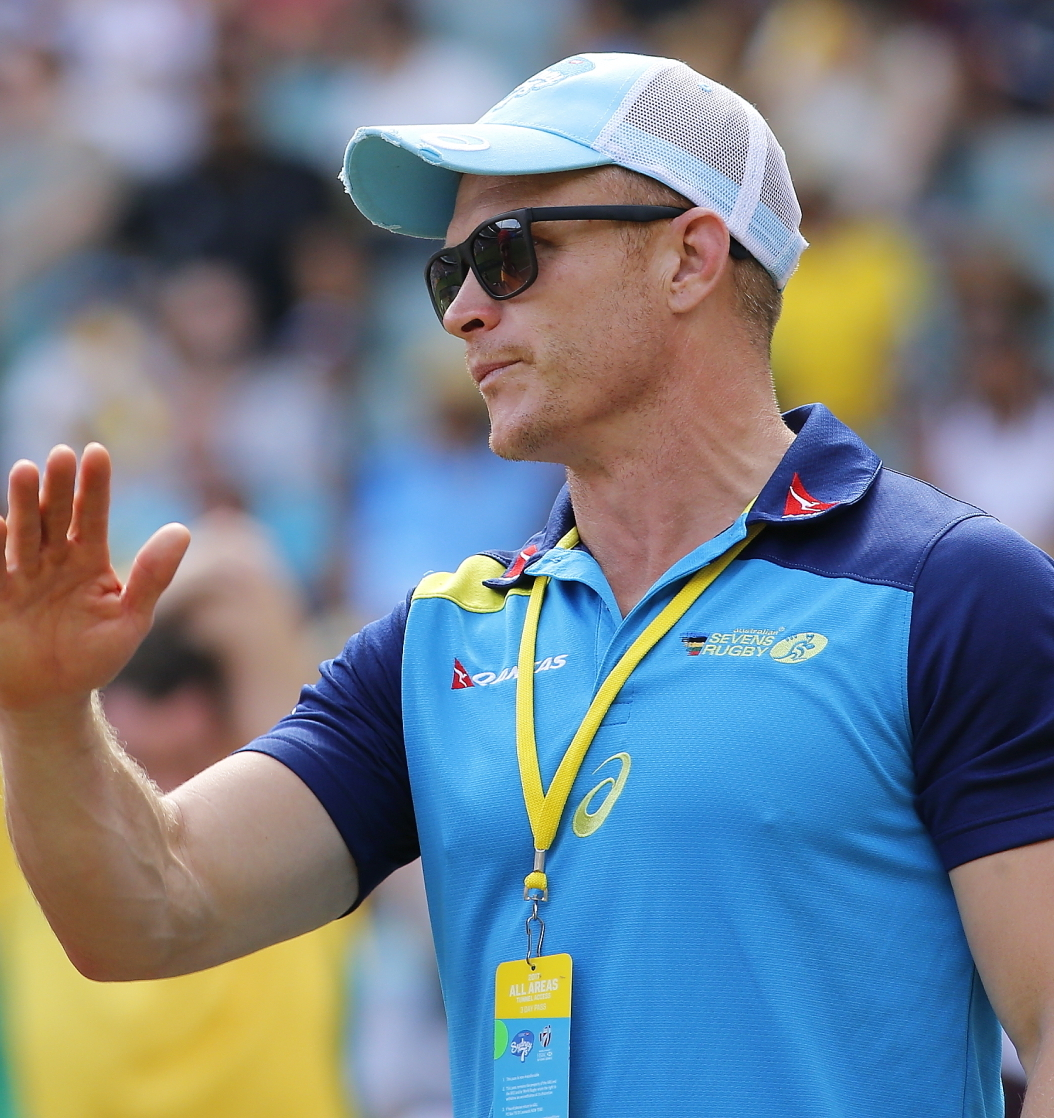
- Walsh in 2017
- Born: 10 April 1979 (age 47) Sydney, New South Wales, Australia
- Height: 1.75 m (5 ft 9 in)
- Weight: 85 kg (187 lb)

Rugby union career
- Position: Fly-half
Senior career
Years	Team	Apps	(Points)
2002–2003	North Harbour		
2003–2004	Worcester Warriors	13	(144)
2004–2006	Leeds Carnegie	15	(28)
2006–2008	Birmingham & Solihull	48	(153)
2008–2011	Newbury	55	(315)
2011–2012	Petrarca Padova	40	(95)
Super Rugby
Years	Team	Apps	(Points)
2004, 2010	Reds	6	(10)
International career
Years	Team	Apps	(Points)
1996	Australian Schoolboys		
1998	Australia U19		
2000	Australia U21		
- Australia Universities
2002–2009	Australia Sevens		
Coaching career
- Years: Team
- 2013–2018: Australia Sevens (Women)
- 2015 (interim): Australia Sevens
- 2018–2021: Australia Sevens
- 2022–2026: Australia Sevens (Women)
- 2025: Mumbai Dreamers
Medal record
Women's rugby sevens (as coach)
Representing Australia
Olympic Games
Gold medal – first place	2016 Rio de Janeiro	Team
Commonwealth Games
Gold medal – first place	2022 Birmingham	Team
Silver medal – second place	2018 Gold Coast	Team

Tim Walsh (born 10 April 1979) is an Australian rugby union coach and a former professional player. He is currently Rugby Australia's director of women's high-performance.

Walsh was previously head coach of the Australian women's sevens team that won the Olympic gold medal in 2016 and a decade later won World Rugby's SVNS in 2025–26. He was also previously head coach of the Australian men's sevens team.

As a rugby player, Walsh was a fly-half for the Queensland Reds in Super Rugby, and for several professional teams in England and Italy. He is a former captain of the Australian men's sevens team.

== Early life ==
Walsh was educated at the Anglican Church Grammar School in Brisbane. He was selected for the Australian Schoolboys team in 1996, and went on to play for Australia Under-19s in 1998.

== Career ==
Walsh began his professional rugby career at the Queensland Reds in 1999, earning two provincial caps off the bench in the Ricoh National Championship. He represented the Australia Under-21s in 2000 and also played for Australian Universities. Walsh later returned to play Super Rugby for Queensland in 2004 and 2010.

In England Walsh played at Leeds Carnegie in the Guinness Premiership. He also spent several seasons playing in the Guinness Championship for Worcester Warriors, Birmingham and Solihull R.F.C. and Newbury RFC where he was captain. He finished his career in Italy in 2012 playing for Petrarca Padova.

Internationally, Walsh played for the Australian Sevens team for several seasons on the Sevens World Series circuit, and captained the team.

== Coaching career ==
Walsh became head coach of the Australia women's national rugby sevens team in 2013, and qualified the team for the 2016 Olympic Sevens tournament. The women's team went on to win the gold medal, defeating New Zealand 24–17 in the final. "It's an Olympics sport and we're very successful at it." Walsh said after the medal ceremony.

In September 2015, he took over as interim Head Coach of the Australia men's sevens team for their Olympic qualification campaign, following the resignation of Geraint John. After the 2018 Commonwealth Games, he took over the head coaching position of the men's team. In 2022 he swapped roles with John Manenti and became head coach of the Australian women's sevens team again.
