= Va'a Apelu Maliko =

Samoan rugby sevens player

- Born: 10 October 1998 (age 28) Moto'otua, Samoa
- Height: 183 cm (6 ft 0 in)
- Weight: 90 kg (198 lb; 14 st 2 lb)

Rugby union career
- Position: Centre
National sevens team
Years	Team	Comps
2018–present	Samoa	

Va'aufauese Apelu-Maliko (born 10 November 1998) is a Samoan rugby sevens player. He captained Samoa at the 2024 Summer Olympics in Paris.
