= DJ Forbes =

New Zealand rugby union player

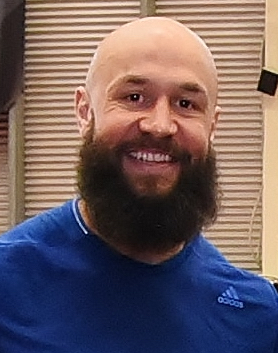
- Forbes in 2017
- Born: Derek Jamie Forbes; 15 December 1982 (age 43) Auckland, New Zealand
- Height: 1.89 m (6 ft 2 in)
- Weight: 103 kg (227 lb)
- Notable relative: Peter Fatialofa (uncle)

Rugby union career
- Position: Flanker
Provincial / State sides
Years	Team	Apps	(Points)
2002	King Country	2	(0)
2007	Auckland	1	(0)
2008–12	Counties Manukau	41	(20)
- Correct as of 14 March 2016
National sevens team
Years	Team		Comps
2006–2017	New Zealand		89
- Correct as of 14 March 2016
Coaching career
- Years: Team
- 2025-: Hyderabad Heroes
Medal record
Men's rugby sevens
Representing New Zealand
Commonwealth Games
Gold medal – first place	2010 Delhi	Team competition
Silver medal – second place	2014 Glasgow	Team competition

Derek Jamie "DJ" Forbes (born 15 December 1982) is a New Zealand former rugby union player and captain of the All Blacks Sevens team. Forbes is part Samoan, and also played rugby fifteens as a loose forward for Counties Manukau.

Forbes was born in Auckland, New Zealand. He attended Liston College, Waitakere. He received the captaincy role in 2006 and subsequently played in over 80 tournaments, winning six Sevens Series titles and one Gold and one Silver Commonwealth Games medal. Forbes stepped down as captain for the All Blacks Sevens to concentrate on earning a spot in the team for the 2016 Olympics.

His uncle is the late former Samoan international Peter Fatialofa.

Forbes was awarded the 2008 New Zealand Samoan Sportsperson of the year. He announced his retirement from rugby sevens in 2017. He appeared in 512 games in 89 tournaments and won six World Series.

== Boxing ==
In 2023, Isaac Peach trained Forbes out of Peach Boxing for a celebrity corporate charity boxing fight against Sione Faumuina at 2023 Fight for life.

== Awards ==
- IRB International Sevens Player of the Year 2008
- New Zealand Samoan Sports Association Sportsperson of the Year 2008
- World Rugby Hall of Fame inductee 168: 2024.
