= India men's national rugby sevens team =

India Men's Sevens
- Union: Rugby India
- Coach: Paul Albaladejo
- Captain: Mohit Khatri

India men's national rugby sevens team
Medal record

Asia Rugby Sevens Trophy
Silver medal – second place	2025 Oman	

CASA Sevens Tournament
Silver medal – second place	2026 Uzbekistan	

The India men's national rugby sevens team is a minor national sevens side. Sevens was first played in India in 1886 at the Khajjiar Gymkhana. India qualified for the 2010 Commonwealth Games as hosts.

== Tournament history ==
=== CASA Sevens ===
CASA Sevens record
Year	Result	Position	Pld	W	L	Ref
(Uzbekistan) 2026	1st place match	2nd place, silver medalist(s)	6	4	2	

=== Sri Lanka Sevens ===
- 1999 – (gold) (Bowl)
- 2007 – (gold) (Bowl)

=== Commonwealth Games ===
As the host nation, India received automatic qualification into the Sevens tournament. They were placed in Group B along with giants of the game South Africa, Wales and Tonga and lost all three matches.

=== Asia Rugby Sevens Trophy ===
Won	Lost

2017 Asia Rugby Sevens Trophy
Date	Location	Opposition	Score	Result
3 March	Doha	United Arab Emirates	12–19	Loss
3 March	Doha	United Arab Emirates	0–45	Loss
4 March	Doha	Singapore	7–19	Loss
4 March	Doha	Iran	5–17	Loss
4 March	Doha	Pakistan	14–12	Win

2019 Asia Rugby Sevens Trophy
Date	Location	Opposition	Score	Result
10 August	Jakarta	Brunei	33–7	Win
10 August	Jakarta	Singapore	12–27	Loss
11 August	Jakarta	Afghanistan	17–12	Win
11 August	Jakarta	Indonesia	24–14	Win

2022 Asia Rugby Sevens Trophy
Date	Location	Opposition	Score	Result
6 August	Jakarta	Jordan	12–14	Loss
6 August	Jakarta	Afghanistan	7–27	Loss
7 August	Jakarta	Iraq	20–0	Win
7 August	Jakarta	Brunei	24–0	Win
7 August	Jakarta	Pakistan	12–5	Win

2023 Asia Rugby Sevens Trophy
Date	Location	Opposition	Score	Result
3 November	Doha	Iraq	47–0	Win
3 November	Doha	Afghanistan	5–7	Loss
4 November	Doha	Bahrain	10–19	Loss
4 November	Doha	Uzbekistan	24–7	Win
4 November	Doha	Qatar	19–14	Win

2024 Asia Rugby Sevens Trophy
Date	Location	Opposition	Score	Result
4 October	Nepal	Bangladesh	31–5	Win
4 October	Nepal	Chinese Taipei	7–33	Loss
5 October	Nepal	Bahrain	35–7	Win
5 October	Nepal	Sri Lanka	0–22	Loss
5 October	Nepal	Qatar	14–7	Win

2025 Asia Rugby Sevens Trophy
Date	Location	Opposition	Score	Result
25 October	Muscat	Lebanon	14–10	Win
25 October	Muscat	Afghanistan	26–5	Win
26 October	Muscat	Saudi Arabia	17–0	Win
26 October	Muscat	Iran	21–7	Win
26 October	Muscat	Kazakhstan	0–27	Loss
