= 2019 Paris Sevens =

- Sevens World Series XX
- Host nation: France
- Date: 1–2 June 2019

Cup
- Champion: Fiji
- Runner-up: New Zealand
- Third: South Africa

Challenge Trophy
- Winner: Canada

Tournament details
- Matches played: 45
- Tries scored: 304 (average 6.76 per match)
- Most points: Jean-Pascal Barraque (48)
- Most tries: Aminiasi Tuimaba (7); Luciano Gonzalez (7); Regan Ware (7)

The 2019 Paris Sevens was the final event of the 2018–19 World Rugby Sevens Series and the twelfth edition of the France Sevens. The tournament was held on 1–2 June 2019 at Stade Jean-Bouin, Paris.

== Format ==
Sixteen teams were drawn into four pools of four teams each. Each team played all the others in their pool once. The top two teams from each pool advanced to the Cup quarterfinals. The bottom two teams from each group advanced to the Challenge Trophy quarterfinals.

== Teams ==
The fifteen core teams played in the tournament, along with one invited team, 2018 Rugby Europe Sevens Grand Prix Series champion and core team for the 2019–20 season, Ireland.

- Argentina
- Australia
- Canada
- England
- Fiji
- France
- Ireland
- Japan
- Kenya
- New Zealand
- Samoa
- Scotland
- South Africa
- Spain
- United States
- Wales

== Pool stages ==
All times in Central European Summer Time (UTC+02:00)

=== Pool A ===
Team	Pld	W	D	L	PF	PA	PD	Pts
Fiji	3	3	0	0	132	45	+87	9
Argentina	3	2	0	1	79	66	+13	7
Ireland	3	1	0	2	39	76	–37	5
England	3	0	0	3	47	110	–63	3

1 June 2019
12:28

Ireland	7–22	Argentina
Try: Sullivan 7'c Con: Dardis (1/1) 7'	Report	Try: Gonzalez (3) 4'm, 8'c, 13'm Bazan Velez 10'm Con: Mare (1/4) 8'

Stade Jean-Bouin
Referee: Matt Rodden (Hong Kong)

1 June 2019
12:50

Fiji	52–14	England
Try: Vakurunabili 0'c Derenalagi 2'm Mocenacagi 3'c Nacuqu 7'c Bolaca 8'c Naduva 9'c Tuivuaka 11'c Cakaubalavu 13'c Con: Nacuqu (3/4) 1', 3', 7'; Bolaca (4/4) 8', 9', 12', 14'	Report	Try: Harris 5'c Rodwell 10'c Con: Guiry (2/2) 5', 11'

Stade Jean-Bouin
Referee: Paulo Duarte (Portugal)

1 June 2019
15:54

Ireland	27–14	England
Try: Kelly 1'm Lennox 3'c Maher 5'm McGrath (2) 9'm, 14'm Con: Dardis (1/4) 3'; Lennox (0/1)	Report	Try: Harris 7'c Sofolarin 7'c Con: Guiry (2/2) 7', 8'

Stade Jean-Bouin
Referee: Sam Grove-White (Scotland)

1 June 2019
16:16

Fiji	40–26	Argentina
Try: Tuimaba (2) 2'c, 6'm Nacuqu 4'c Botitu (2) 7'c, 8'c Cakaubalavu 14'c Con: Nacuqu (3/4) 2', 4', 7'; Botitu (1/1) 9'; Bolaca (1/1) 14'	Report	Try: Sábato (2) 0'c, 5'; Barbier 11'm Gonzalez 13'c Con: Ulloa (2/2) 1', 5'; Mare (1/2) 13'

Stade Jean-Bouin
Referee: Richard Kelly (New Zealand)

1 June 2019
19:20

Argentina	31–19	England
Try: Gonzales (2) 1'c, 8'm Bazan Velez 7'c Barbier (2) 9'm, 10'c Con: Mare (2/3) 2', 7'; Revol (1/1) 11' del Mestre (0/1)	Report	Try: Waters 6'c de Cothi 12'c Coyle 14'm Con: Guiry (1/1) 7' de Cothi (1/1) 12'

Stade Jean-Bouin
Referee: Jérémy Rozier (France)

1 June 2019
19:42

Fiji	40–5	Ireland
Try: Tuimaba (3) 2'c, 3'c, 6'c Naduva (2) 7'c, 9'c Tuivuaka 14'm Con: Botitu (5/6) 2', 4', 7', 8', 9'	Report	Try: Sullivan 12'm Con: Dardis (0/1)

Stade Jean-Bouin
Referee: Jordan Way (Australia)

=== Pool B ===
Team	Pld	W	D	L	PF	PA	PD	Pts
South Africa	3	3	0	0	70	36	+34	9
Kenya	3	1	1	1	57	69	–12	6
Wales	3	1	0	2	52	55	–3	5
Australia	3	0	1	2	43	62	–19	4

1 June 2019
11:44

South Africa	22−7	Wales
Try: du Plessis 6'c Afrika 7'm du Preez 9'm Ndhlovu 13'm Con: du Preez (1/3) 6'; Afrika (0/1)	Report	Try: Goodchild 11'c Con: Davies (1/1) 11'

Stade Jean-Bouin
Referee: Tevita Rokovereni (Fiji)

1 June 2019
12:06

Australia	19−19	Kenya
Try: Coward 1'c Anderson 6'c Hood 13'm Con: Coward (2/2) 2', 7'; Holland (0/1)	Report	Try: Omondi 4'm Amonde 5'c Mwale 10'c Con: Olindi (1/1) 6'; Wanjala (1/2) 11'; Pen: Olindi (0/1)

Stade Jean-Bouin
Referee: Damián Schneider (Argentina)

1 June 2019
15:10

South Africa	29−12	Kenya
Try: du Plessis (9) 2'm, 9'm Soyizwapi 3'm Visser 11'c Ndhlovu 12'c Con: Human (2/2) 11', 12' du Preez (0/3)	Report	Try: Ojee 5'm Amonde 7'c Con: Wanjala (1/2) 7'

Stade Jean-Bouin
Referee: Paulo Duarte (Portugal)

1 June 2019
15:32

Australia	7–24	Wales
Try: Longbottom 3'c Con: Holland (1/1) 3'	Report	Try: O. Jenkins 1'm Goodchild (2) 5'c, 11'm J. Jenkins 14'c Con: Davies (1/3) 5'; Treharne (1/1) 14'

Stade Jean-Bouin
Referee: Jérémy Rozier (France)

1 June 2019
18:36

Wales	21–26	Kenya
Try: Goodchild (2) 0'c, 4'c J. Jenkins 12'c Con: Davies (2/2) 1', 4'; Treharne (1/1) 12'	Report	Try: Oluoch 6'c Mwale 7'c Oyoo (2) 9'm, 11'c Con: Wanjala (3/4) 6', 8', 11'

Stade Jean-Bouin
Referee: Sam Grove-White (Scotland)

1 June 2019
18:58

Australia	17–19	South Africa
Try: Hood 6'm Longbottom 7'm Maddocks 12'c Con: Holland (1/3) 12'	Report	Try: Geduld 0'c Pretorius 2'c Visser 9'm Con: du Preez (2/3) 0', 2'

Stade Jean-Bouin
Referee: Richard Kelly (New Zealand)

=== Pool C ===
Team	Pld	W	D	L	PF	PA	PD	Pts
United States	3	3	0	0	90	33	+57	9
Samoa	3	2	0	1	66	64	+2	7
Spain	3	1	0	2	43	81	–38	5
Canada	3	0	0	3	50	71	–21	3

1 June 2019
11:00

Canada	19–21	Samoa
Try: Fuailefau 3'm Coe (2) 7'c, 11'c Con: Hirayama (2/3) 7', 11'	Report	Try: Alosio 0'c Motuga 8'c Leilua 13'c Con: Mealoi (3/3) 1', 9', 13'

Stade Jean-Bouin
Referee: Richard Kelly (New Zealand)

1 June 2019
11:22

United States	31–7	Spain
Try: Iosefo 0'm Barrett 2'm Isles (2) 5'c, 7'c Tupuola 12'c Con: Hughes (3/5) 6', 7', 13'	Report	Try: Mata 14'c Con: Fontes (1/1) 14'

Stade Jean-Bouin
Referee: Jérémy Rozier (France)

1 June 2019
14:26

Canada	19–24	Spain
Try: Hirayama 5'c Zaruba 10'm Morra 14'c Con: Hirayama (1/2) 5'; Coats (1/1) 14'	Report	Try: Fontes (3) 1'm, 1'c, 9'c Martínez 13'm Con: de Santiago (2/2) 2', 9'; Mateu (0/1); Fontes (0/1)

Stade Jean-Bouin
Referee: Damián Schneider (Argentina)

1 June 2019
14:48

United States	33–14	Samoa
Try: Hughes 3'c Iosefo 7'm Isles 7'c Tupuola 9'c Baker 13'c Con: Hughes (3/4) 4', 8', 13'; Tupuola (1/1) 10'	Report	Try: Motuga 2'c Perez 12'c Con: Mealoi (1/1) 2'; Toilolo Fanuasa 12'c

Stade Jean-Bouin
Referee: Jordan Way (Australia)

1 June 2019
17:52

Samoa	31–12	Spain
Try: Vaili 2'c Mealoi 4'c Alofipo 10'm Alosio (2) 7'c, 11'm Con: Mealoi (3/4) 2', 4', 7'; Leilua (0/1)	Report	Try: Fontes 5'm Ramos 14'c Con: Ramos (1/1) 14' de Santiago (0/1)

Stade Jean-Bouin
Referee: Tevita Rokovereni (Fiji)

1 June 2019
18:14

United States	26–12	Canada
Try: Iosefo 2'c Isles 3'm Williams (2) 7'c, 12'c Con: Hughes (2/3) 2', 8'; Tomasin (1/1) 13'	Report	Try: Morra 0'm Jones 9'c Con: Hirayama (1/2) 9'

Stade Jean-Bouin
Referee: Matt Rodden (Hong Kong)

=== Pool D ===
Team	Pld	W	D	L	PF	PA	PD	Pts
New Zealand	3	3	0	0	62	36	+26	9
France	3	1	0	2	52	46	+6	5
Japan	3	1	0	2	52	67	–15	5
Scotland	3	1	0	2	46	63	–17	5

1 June 2019
13:12

New Zealand	14−12	Scotland
Try: Ware 4'c Nareki 12'c Con: Knewstubb (2/2) 5', 13'	Report	Try: Coombes 7'c Bryce 10'm Con: Lowe (1/1) 7'; Fergusson (0/1)

Stade Jean-Bouin
Referee: Jordan Way (Australia)

1 June 2019
13:34

France	14–17	Japan
Try: Mazzoleni 1'c Barraque 13'c Con: Barraque (1/1) 2', 13'	Report	Try: Matsui 3'm Sakai 8'c Motomura 9'm Con: Sakai (1/3) 8'

Stade Jean-Bouin
Referee: Sam Grove-White (Scotland)

1 June 2019
16:38

New Zealand	31–14	Japan
Try: Nareki (2) 1'c, 9'; Ware 7'm Nicole 12'c Knewstubb 14'c Con: Knewstubb (2/3) 1', 14'; McGarvey-Black (1/2) 13'	Report	Try: Toloke 2'c Motomura 5'c Con: Sakai (2/2) 3', 5'

Stade Jean-Bouin
Referee: Tevita Rokovereni (Fiji)

1 June 2019
17:00

France	28–12	Scotland
Try: Bonnefond 1'c O'Connor 4'c Lakafia 5'c Jacquelain 9'c Con: Barraque (4/4) 2', 5', 6', 9'	Report	Try: Farndale 7'm Fergusson 11'c Con: Fergusson (1/2) 11'

Stade Jean-Bouin
Referee: Matt Rodden (Hong Kong)

1 June 2019
20:04

Scotland	22–21	Japan
Try: McFarland (2) 1'm, 10'm Bryce 8'm Barreto 14'c Con: Lowe (1/4) 14'	Report	Try: Soejima 4'c Toloke 7'c Fujita 13'c Con: Sakai (3/3) 4', 7', 13'

Stade Jean-Bouin
Referee: Damián Schneider (Argentina)

1 June 2019
20:26

France	10–17	New Zealand
Try: Barraque (2) 2'm, 12'm Con: Barraque (0/2)	Report	Try: Curry 4'c Molia 6'm Ware 10'm Con: Knewstubb (1/3) 4'

Stade Jean-Bouin
Referee: Paulo Duarte (Portugal)

== Knockout stage ==
=== 13th place ===
Semi-finals
2 June 2019 – 13:11 – Stade Jean Bouin
Scotland	47
Spain	14
2 June 2019 – 13:33 – Stade Jean Bouin
Japan	33
Wales	17

13th place final
2 June 2019 – 16:47 – Stade Jean Bouin
Scotland	31
Japan	26

Matches

Semi-finals

2 June 2019
13:11

Scotland	47–14	Spain
Try: McFarland (3) 1'c, 2'm, 6'c Barreto (2) 3'c, 7'c Lowe 10'c Rowe 14'c Con: Lowe (5/6) 1', 4', 7', 8', 10'; McCann (1/1) 14'	Report	Try: de Santiago 7'c Mateu 12'c Con: de Santiago (1/1) 7'; Mateu (1/1) 13'

Stade Jean Bouin
Referee: Matt Rodden (Hong Kong)

2 June 2019
13:33

Japan	33–17	Wales
Try: Soejima (2) 3'c, 4'c Toloke 7'c Motomura 12'c Con: Hashino (3/4) 4', 5', 12'	Report	Try: O. Jenkins (2) 10'm, 11'm Morgan-Williams 12'c Con: Treharne (1/2) 12'; Davies (0/1)

Stade Jean Bouin
Referee: Tevita Rokovereni (Fiji)

13th place final

2 June 2019
14:47

Scotland	31–26	Japan
Try: McFarland 0'c McCann 1'm Barreto (2) 4'c, 14'c Farndale 14'; Con: Lowe (2/3) 0', 5'; Riddell (1/1) 14'	Report	Try: Hano (2) 7'c, 9'c Tuqiri 8'm Motomura 12'c Con: Hashino (3/4) 7', 9', 12'

Stade Jean Bouin
Referee: Tevita Rokovereni (Fiji)

=== Challenge Trophy ===
Quarter-finals
2 June 2019 – 10:00 – Stade Jean Bouin
Ireland	24
Scotland	12
2 June 2019 – 10:22 – Stade Jean Bouin
Spain	0
Australia	54
2 June 2019 – 10:44 – Stade Jean Bouin
Japan	7
England	52
2 June 2019 – 11:06 – Stade Jean Bouin
Wales	12
Canada	31

Semi-finals
2 June 2019 – 13:55 – Stade Jean Bouin
Ireland	24
Australia	17
2 June 2019 – 14:17 – Stade Jean Bouin
England	28
Canada	41

Challenge Trophy final
2 June 2019 – 17:09 – Stade Jean Bouin
Ireland	12
Canada	28

Matches

Quarter-finals

2 June 2019
10:00

Ireland	24–12	Scotland
Try: Sullivan (2) 1'm, 3'm Lennox 7'c Izuchukwu 9'c Con: Dardis (2/4) 7', 9'	Report	Try: Farndale 5'c Con: Lowe (1/1) 5'

Stade Jean Bouin
Referee: Damián Schneider (Argentina)

2 June 2019
10:22

Spain	0–54	Australia
	Report	Try: Kennewell 0'c Skelton (2) 2'c, 6'm Pincus 3'c Maddocks 8'c Hood 11'c Hutchison 13'c Coward 14'c Con: Coward (7/8) 0', 2', 3', 8', 11', 14', 14'

Stade Jean Bouin
Referee: Tevita Rokovereni (Fiji)

2 June 2019
10:44

Japan	7–52	England
Try: Hano 13'c Con: Nakazawa (1/1) 14'	Report	Try: Waters (2) 1'm, 9'c Rodwell (2) 3'c, 14'c Glover (2) 5'c, 7'c Harris 11'c Ollie Hassell-Collins 12'm Con: Cook (4/4) 3', 5', 7', 9'; Guiry (2/3) 11', 14'; Waters (0/1)

Stade Jean Bouin
Referee: Matt Rodden (Hong Kong)

2 June 2019
11:06

Wales	12–31	Canada
Try: Rogers (2) 0'c, 7'm Con: Davies (1/2) 1'	Report	Try: Coe 2'c Hirayama 5'c Mullins 8'm Jones 11'm Berna 13'c Con: Hirayama (2/3) 2', 5'; Coats (1/2) 13'

Stade Jean Bouin
Referee: Jérémy Rozier (France)

Semi-finals

2 June 2019
13:55

Ireland	24–17	Australia
Try: Jack Kelly (rugby union, born 1997) (2) 4'c, 12'm Mollen 7'm Fitzpatrick 9'c Con: Billy Dardis (2/3) 5', 10'; Lennox (0/1)	Report	Try: Hood 1'm O'Donnell 2'm Pincus 11'c Con: Coward (1/3) 11'

Stade Jean Bouin
Referee: Paulo Duarte (Portugal)

2 June 2019
14:17

England	28–41	Canada
Try: Waters 3'c Cook 5'c de Cothi 9'c Hassell-Collins 13'c Con: Cook (3/3) 4', 5', 13' de Cothi 10'	Report	Try: Fuailefau 0'm Morra (3) 2'm, 7'c, 11'm Berna 6'm Coats 7'c Thiel 14'c Con: Coats (1/4) 7'; Hirayama (2/3) 8', 14'

Stade Jean Bouin
Referee: Damián Schneider (Argentina)

Challenge Trophy final

2 June 2019
17:09

Ireland	12–28	Canada
Try: McNulty 2'm Dardis 10'c Con: Dardis (1/2) 10'	Report	Try: Fuailefau 0'c Jones 4'c Morra 5'c Zaruba 13'c Con: Hirayama (4/4) 0', 4', 5', 14'

Stade Jean Bouin
Referee: Jérémy Rozier (France)

=== 5th place ===
Semi-finals
2 June 2019 – 14:39 – Stade Jean Bouin
France	^{26}_{^{(a.e.t.)}}
Kenya	21
2 June 2019 – 15:01 – Stade Jean Bouin
Argentina	10
Samoa	12

5th place final
2 June 2019 – 17:46 – Stade Jean Bouin
France	40
Samoa	5

Matches

Semi-finals

2 June 2019
14:39

France	26–21^{(a.e.t.)}	Kenya
Try: O'Connor 3'c Dall'igna (2) 11'c, 14'; Laugel 14'c Con: Barraque (3/3) 3', 11', 14'	Report	Try: Oyoo (2) 1'c, 5'c Kuto 7'c Con: Wanjala (3/3) 2', 5', 8'

Stade Jean Bouin
Referee: Sam Grove-White (Scotland)

2 June 2019
15:01

Argentina	10–12	Samoa
Try: del Mestre 5'm Gonzalez 14'; Con: del Mestre (0/1); Revol (0/1)	Report	Try: Alosio 7'm Perez 11'c Con: Mealoi (1/1) 12'; Toilolo Fanuasa (0/1)

Stade Jean Bouin
Referee: Jordan Way (Australia)

5th place final

2 June 2019
17:46

France	40–5	Samoa
Try: Valleau 1'c Parez (3) 2'm, 6'c, 8'c O'Connor 7'c Laugel 10'c Con: Barraque (5/6) 1', 6', 7', 8', 11'	Report	Try: Toilolo Fanuasa 4'm Con: Toilolo Fanuasa (0/1)

Stade Jean Bouin
Referee: Richard Kelly (New Zealand)

=== Cup ===
Quarter-finals
2 June 2019 – 11:28 – Stade Jean Bouin
Fiji	24
France	5
2 June 2019 – 11:50 – Stade Jean Bouin
United States	26
Kenya	14
2 June 2019 – 12:12 – Stade Jean Bouin
New Zealand	21
Argentina	12
2 June 2019 – 12:34 – Stade Jean Bouin
South Africa	40
Samoa	7

Semi-finals
2 June 2019 – 15:23 – Stade Jean Bouin
Fiji	33
United States	14
2 June 2019 – 15:45 – Stade Jean Bouin
New Zealand	33
South Africa	7

Cup final
2 June 2019 – 18:33 – Stade Jean Bouin
Fiji	35
New Zealand	24
Bronze final
2 June 2019 – 18:08 – Stade Jean Bouin
United States	7
South Africa	24

Matches

Quarter-finals

2 June 2019
11:28

Fiji	24–5	France
Try: Botitu 7'c Tuivuaka 9'c Tuimaba 10'm Naduva 12'm Con: Botitu (2/4) 8', 9'	Report	Try: Barraque 5'm Con: Barraque (0/1)

Stade Jean Bouin
Referee: Jordan Way (Australia)

2 June 2019
11:50

United States	26–14	Kenya
Try: Tomasin 7'm Williams 8'c Leuta 10'c Hughes 13'c Con: Williams (1/1) 8'; Hughes (2/3) 11', 13'	Report	Try: Olindi 1'c Oyoo 4'c Con: Wanjala (2/2) 1', 5'

Stade Jean Bouin
Referee: Richard Kelly (New Zealand)

2 June 2019
12:12

New Zealand	21–12	Argentina
Try: Molia (2) 3'c, 9'c Knewstubb 6'c Con: Knewstubb (3/3) 4', 7', 9'	Report	Try: Bazan Velez 1'm Sábato 11'c Con: del Mestre (1/1) 11'; Bazan Velez (0/1)

Stade Jean Bouin
Referee: Paulo Duarte (Portugal)

2 June 2019
12:34

South Africa	40–7	Samoa
Try: Geduld 1'm du Preez 2'c Kok 4'c Geduld 7'c du Plessis 7'c Snyman 13'c Con: du Preez (4/5) 2', 5', 7', 8'; Human (1/1) 13'	Report	Try: Motuga 14'c Con: Toilolo Fanuasa (1/1) 14'

Stade Jean Bouin
Referee: Sam Grove-White (Scotland)

Semi-finals

2 June 2019
15:23

Fiji	33–14	United States
Try: Derenalagi 2'c Mocenacagi 3'm Tuwai 7'c Botitu 8'c Tabu 14'c Con: Botitu (3/4) 2', 7', 8'; Tuimaba 14'	Report	Try: Isles 5'c Williams 10'c Con: Hughes (1/1) 6'; Tomasin (1/1) 10'

Stade Jean Bouin
Referee: Richard Kelly (New Zealand)

2 June 2019
15:45

New Zealand	33–7	South Africa
Try: Ware (2) 1'c, 5'c Nareki 6'c Knewstubb 11'c Nicole 13'm Con: Knewstubb (4/5)	Report	Try: Afrika 9'c Con: Human (1/1) 9'

Stade Jean Bouin
Referee: Jérémy Rozier (France)

Bronze final

2 June 2019
18:08

United States	7–24	South Africa
Try: Baker 2'c Con: Hughes (1/1) 2'	Report	Try: du Plessis (2) 5'm, 13'c Oosthuizen 7'c Snyman 10'm Con: Human (2/4) 7', 13'

Stade Jean Bouin
Referee: Jordan Way (Australia)

Cup final

2 June 2019
18:33

Fiji	35–24	New Zealand
Try: Bolaca (2) 0'c, 7'c Derenalagi 2'c Tuimaba 3'c Tuwai 7'c Con: Bolaca (5/5) 1', 2', 4', 7', 8'	Report	Try: Nareki 6'c Ware (2) 11'm, 14'm Collier 12'c Con: Knewstubb (1/2) 6'; McGarvey-Black (1/2) 12'

Stade Jean Bouin
Referee: Paulo Duarte (Portugal)

== Tournament placings ==
Place	Team	Points
1st place, gold medalist(s)	Fiji	22
2nd place, silver medalist(s)	New Zealand	19
3rd place, bronze medalist(s)	South Africa	17
4	United States	15
5	France	13
6	Samoa	12
7	Argentina	10
7	Kenya	10

Place	Team	Points
9	Canada	8
10	Ireland	7
11	Australia	5
11	England	5
13	Scotland	3
14	Japan	2
15	Spain	1
15	Wales	1

Source: World Rugby

== Players ==
=== Scoring leaders ===
Tries scored
Rank	Player	Tries
1	Aminiasi Tuimaba	7
1	Luciano Gonzalez	7
1	Regan Ware	7
4	Josiah Morra	6
4	Max McFarland	6
4	Muller du Plessis	6

Points scored
Rank	Player	Points
1	Jean-Pascal Barraque	48
2	Vilimoni Botitu	42
3	Andrew Knewstubb	41
4	Aminiasi Tuimaba	37
5	Madison Hughes	36

Source: World Rugby

== See also ==
- 2019 France Women's Sevens

World Sevens Series XX
Preceded by 2019 London Sevens	2019 Paris Sevens	Succeeded by None (last event)
France Sevens
Preceded by 2018 Paris Sevens	2019 Paris Sevens	Succeeded by 2020 Paris Sevens
