= 2019 London Sevens =

- Sevens World Series XX
- Host nation: England
- Date: 25–26 May 2019

Cup
- Champion: Fiji
- Runner-up: Australia
- Third: United States

Challenge Trophy
- Winner: Samoa

Tournament details
- Matches played: 45
- Tries scored: 306 (average 6.8 per match)
- Most points: Andrew Knewstubb (46)
- Most tries: Aminiasi Tuimaba (7); Maurice Longbottom (7)

The 2019 London Sevens was the penultimate event of the 2018–19 World Rugby Sevens Series and the nineteenth edition of the London Sevens. The tournament was held at Twickenham Stadium, London on 25–26 May 2019.

== Format ==
Sixteen teams are drawn into four pools of four teams each. Each team plays all the others in their pool once. The top two teams from each pool advance to the Cup quarterfinals. The bottom two teams from each group advance to the Challenge Trophy quarterfinals.

== Teams ==
The fifteen core teams played in the tournament, along with one invited team, 2018 Rugby Europe Sevens Grand Prix Series champion and core team for the 2019–20 season, Ireland.

- Argentina
- Australia
- Canada
- England
- Fiji
- France
- Ireland
- Japan
- Kenya
- New Zealand
- Samoa
- Scotland
- South Africa
- Spain
- United States
- Wales

== Pool stages ==
All times in British Summer Time (UTC+01:00).

=== Pool A ===
| Team | Pld | W | D | L | PF | PA | PD | Pts |
|---|---|---|---|---|---|---|---|---|
| South Africa | 3 | 3 | 0 | 0 | 134 | 35 | +99 | 9 |
| Canada | 3 | 2 | 0 | 1 | 59 | 69 | –10 | 7 |
| Argentina | 3 | 1 | 0 | 2 | 69 | 61 | +8 | 5 |
| Japan | 3 | 0 | 0 | 3 | 19 | 116 | –97 | 3 |

25 May 2019
10:58

| Argentina | 12–14 | Canada |
| Try: Álvarez 1'c Con: del Mestre (1/2) 2' | Report | Try: Mullins 3'c Douglas 6'c Con: Hirayama (2/2) 4', 7' |

Twickenham Stadium
Referee: Richard Haughton (England)

25 May 2019
11:20

| South Africa | 49–0 | Japan |
| Try: Arendse (2) 1'c, 12'c du Preez 3'c Geduld 4'c Soyizwapi 6'c Davids 9'c Makata 14'c Con: du Preez (4/4) 2', 3', 5', 6'; Davids (3/3) 9', 12', 14' | Report |

Twickenham Stadium
Referee: Tevita Rokovereni (Fiji)

25 May 2019
14:04

| Argentina | 36–7 | Japan |
| Try: Osadczuk 1'c Vanni 2'm Schulz 3'm Sábato 7'c Ulloa (2) 13'c, 14'm Con: Bazan Velez (2/4) 1', 8'; Ulloa (1/2) 13' | Report | Try: Toloke 5'c Con: Hashino (1/1) 5' |

Twickenham Stadium
Referee: Jérémy Rozier (France)

25 May 2019
14:26

| South Africa | 45–14 | Canada |
| Try: Kok (2) 0'c, 10'm Arendse 4'c Soyizwapi 7'm Pretorius 8'c Visser 13'c Davids 14'c Con: du Preez (2/3) 1', 5'; Davids (3/4) 9', 13', 14' | Report | Try: Mullins 3'c McCloskey 6'c Con: Hirayama (2/2) 3', 7' |

Twickenham Stadium
Referee: Sam Grove-White (Scotland)

25 May 2019
17:10

| Canada | 31–12 | Japan |
| Try: Zaruba (3) 0'c, 4'c, 6'm Douglas 8'c Thiel 12'm Con: Hirayama (3/4) 0', 5', 8'; Jones (0/1) | Report | Try: Sakai 3'm Hashino 10'c Con: Sakai (1/2) 11' |

Twickenham Stadium
Referee: Jordan Way (Australia)

25 May 2019
17:32

| South Africa | 40–21 | Argentina |
| Try: Soyizwapi (2) 2'c, 6'c Arendse 5'c Gans 8'c du Plessis 9'm Kok 13'c Con: du Preez (3/3) 3', 5', 7'; Davids (2/3) 8', 14' | Report | Try: Schulz 4'c Sábato (2) 11'c, 12'c Con: Bazan Velez (1/1) 4'; Revol (1/1) 11'; Ulloa (1/1) 12' |

Twickenham Stadium
Referee: Paulo Duarte (Portugal)

=== Pool B ===
| Team | Pld | W | D | L | PF | PA | PD | Pts |
|---|---|---|---|---|---|---|---|---|
| Fiji | 3 | 3 | 0 | 0 | 81 | 44 | +37 | 9 |
| France | 3 | 2 | 0 | 1 | 63 | 62 | +1 | 7 |
| Kenya | 3 | 1 | 0 | 2 | 55 | 75 | –20 | 5 |
| Samoa | 3 | 0 | 0 | 3 | 51 | 69 | –18 | 3 |

25 May 2019
10:14

| Samoa | 14–22 | France |
| Try: Matavao 6'c Afamasaga 7'c Con: Alosio (1/1) 6'; Tila Mealoi (1/1) 8' | Report | Try: Veredamu (2) 0'c, 5'm Alerte 9'm Laugel 11'm Con: Barraque (1/4) 1' |

Twickenham Stadium
Referee: Jordan Way (Australia)

25 May 2019
10:36

| Fiji | 24–17 | Kenya |
| Try: Tuimaba (2) 0'c, 8'm Derenalagi 6'm Dranisinukula 12'c Con: Ikanikoda (2/4) 0', 12' | Report | Try: Mwale (2) 1'm, 7'c Oluoch 9'm Con: Olindi (1/2) 7'; Taabu (0/1) |

Twickenham Stadium
Referee: Matt Rodden (Hong Kong)

25 May 2019
13:20

| Samoa | 20–21 | Kenya |
| Try: Matavao 1'm Alosio 4'm Leilua 7'm Motuga 14'm Con: Mealoi (0/2); Vaili (0/1); Leilua (0/1) | Report | Try: Onyala (3) 5', 6', 12'; Con: Olindi (3/3) 5', 6', 12' |

Twickenham Stadium
Referee: Tevita Rokovereni (Fiji)

25 May 2019
13:42

| Fiji | 31–10 | France |
| Try: Derenalagi 2'c Botitu 4'c Naduva 11'c Tuwai 12'm Ikanikoda 13'm Con: Botitu (2/2) 2', 4'; Ikanikoda (1/3) 11' | Report | Try: Barraque 7'm Riva 9'm Con: Barraque (0/2) |

Twickenham Stadium
Referee: Richard Kelly (New Zealand)

25 May 2019
16:26

| France | 31–17 | Kenya |
| Try: Riva 4'c Barraque 6'c Siega (2) 10'm, 13'm Bonnefond 12'c Con: Barraque (2/4) 5', 13'; Parez (1/1) 7' | Report | Try: Mwale (2) 0'c, 7'm Ojee 2'm Con: Olindi (1/3) 1' |

Twickenham Stadium
Referee: Sam Grove-White (Scotland)

25 May 2019
16:48

| Fiji | 26–17 | Samoa |
| Try: Vakurunabili 1'c Mocenacagi 8'c Tuivuaka 13'c Nacuqu 14'; Con: Ikanikoda (2/2) 2', 8'; Nacuqu (1/2) 13' | Report | Try: Perez 2'c Asofolau (2) 6'm, 9'm Con: Mealoi (1/2) 3'; Alosio (0/1) |

Twickenham Stadium
Referee: Matt Rodden (Hong Kong)

=== Pool C ===
| Team | Pld | W | D | L | PF | PA | PD | Pts |
|---|---|---|---|---|---|---|---|---|
| New Zealand | 3 | 2 | 0 | 1 | 67 | 31 | +36 | 7 |
| Ireland | 3 | 2 | 0 | 1 | 71 | 63 | +8 | 7 |
| England | 3 | 2 | 0 | 1 | 58 | 54 | +4 | 7 |
| Scotland | 3 | 0 | 0 | 3 | 40 | 88 | –48 | 3 |

25 May 2019
11:42

| New Zealand | 21–7 | Scotland |
| Try: Mikkelson 5'c Curry 7'c Gregory 8'c Con: Knewstubb (3/3) 5', 7', 8' | Report | Try: Coombes 10'c Con: Fergusson (1/1) 10' |

Twickenham Stadium
Referee: Paulo Duarte (Portugal)

25 May 2019
12:04

| England | 17–21 | Ireland |
| Try: Olowofela 4'c Bowen 10'm Rodwell 12'm Con: Edwards (1/3) 5' | Report | Try: Fitzpatrick 2'c Mollen 8'c McGrath 13'c Con: Dardis (2/2) 2', 9'; Roche (1/1) 14' |

Twickenham Stadium
Referee: Richard Kelly (New Zealand)

25 May 2019
14:48

| New Zealand | 34–7 | Ireland |
| Try: Ng Shiu 0'm Knewstubb (2) 7', 12'c Ware (2) 7', 13'm Collier 9'm Con: Knewstubb (2/5) 7'; Webber (0/1) | Report | Try: Mollen 10'c Con: Roche (1/1) 10' |

Twickenham Stadium
Referee: Jordan Way (Australia)

25 May 2019
15:10

| England | 24–21 | Scotland |
| Try: Norton (2) 2'c, 6'm Ollie Lindsay-Hague 8'c Bowen 14'm Con: Edwards (2/4) 3', 8' | Report | Try: Farndale 1'c Coombes 3'c Fergusson 4'c Con: Lowe (3/3) 1', 4', 5' |

Twickenham Stadium
Referee: Matt Rodden (Hong Kong)

25 May 2019
17:54

| Scotland | 12–43 | Ireland |
| Try: McFarland 6'c Bryce 7'm Con: Lowe (1/2) 6' | Report | Try: Conroy (3) 0'm, 7'c, 9'm McNulty 4'c Fitzpatrick 10'c Kelly 13'm McGrath 14'c Con: Dardis (1/2) 4'; Roche (3/5) 8', 11', 14' |

Twickenham Stadium
Referee: Damián Schneider (Argentina)

25 May 2019
18:16

| England | 17–12 | New Zealand |
| Try: Lindsay-Hague 0'c Norton 7'm Edwards 7'm Con: Edwards (1/3) 1' | Report | Try: Gregory 4'c Ng Shiu 10'm Con: Knewstubb (1/1) 5'; Webber (0/1) |

Twickenham Stadium
Referee: Jérémy Rozier (France)

=== Pool D ===
| Team | Pld | W | D | L | PF | PA | PD | Pts |
|---|---|---|---|---|---|---|---|---|
| United States | 3 | 3 | 0 | 0 | 76 | 48 | +28 | 9 |
| Australia | 3 | 2 | 0 | 1 | 87 | 41 | +46 | 7 |
| Wales | 3 | 1 | 0 | 2 | 57 | 73 | –16 | 5 |
| Spain | 3 | 0 | 0 | 3 | 34 | 92 | –58 | 3 |

25 May 2019
9:30

| Australia | 28–10 | Wales |
| Try: Holland 4'c Longbottom (2) 10'c, 11'c Hood 14'c Con: Holland (4/4) 4', 10', 11', 14' | Report | Try: Rogers 7'm Goodchild 8'm Con: Treharne (0/2) |

Twickenham Stadium
Referee: Jérémy Rozier (France)

25 May 2019
9:52

| United States | 29–5 | Spain |
| Try: Isles (2) 0'm, 7'm Pinkelman 2'c Baker 8'c Thompson 11'm Con: Hughes (2/5) 3', 8' | Report | Try: Fontes 10'm Con: Fontes (0/1) |

Twickenham Stadium
Referee: Sam Grove-White (Scotland)

25 May 2019
12:36

| Australia | 42–12 | Spain |
| Try: O'Donnell 2'c Longbottom (3) 7'c, 9'c, 14'c Hutchison 12'c Holland 31'c Con: Coward (3/3) 3', 7', 9'; Holland (3/3) 12', 13', 14' | Report | Try: Carrión 0'c Sánchez 4'm Con: de Santiago (1/1) 2'; Mateu (0/1) |

Twickenham Stadium
Referee: Damián Schneider (Argentina)

25 May 2019
12:58

| United States | 28–26 | Wales |
| Try: Pinkelman (2) 2'c, 7'c Baker (2) 5'c, 13'c Con: Tomasin (1/1) 3'; Hughes (3/3) 6', 8', 13' | Report | Try: Lewis 0'm O. Jenkins 7'c Goodchild 9'c Rogers 14'c Con: Treharne (3/4) 7', 9', 15' |

Twickenham Stadium
Referee: Richard Haughton (England)

25 May 2019
15:42

| Wales | 21–17 | Spain |
| Try: O. Jenkins 1'c Williams 7'c J. Jenkins 11'c Con: Treharne (3/3) 1', 7', 12' | Report | Try: Carrión 2' de Santiago 6'm Molinero 8'c Con: de Santiago (1/1) 9'; Mateu (0/1) |

Twickenham Stadium
Referee: Tevita Rokovereni (Fiji)

25 May 2019
16:04

| United States | 19–17 | Australia |
| Try: Isles 1'm Barrett 6'c Tomasin 13'c Con: Hughes (2/3) 6', 14' | Report | Try: Holland 4'm Longbottom 11'c Kennewell 12'; Con: Holland (1/3) 11' |

Twickenham Stadium
Referee: Richard Kelly (New Zealand)

== Knockout stage ==
=== 13th place ===
Semi-finals
26 May 2019 – 12:36 – Twickenham Stadium
Spain | 21
England | 40
26 May 2019 – 12:58 – Twickenham Stadium
Japan | 26
Kenya | 17

13th place final
26 May 2019 – 16:07 – Twickenham Stadium
England | 14
Japan | 29

Matches

Semi-finals

26 May 2019
12:36

| Spain | 21–40 | England |
| Try: Lopez 6'c Rodriguez-Guerra 9'c de Santiago 11'c Con: Mateu (1/1) 6' de Santiago (2/2) 10', 11' | Report | Try: Emery (2) 0'c, 1'c Sofolarin 2'c Lindsay-Hague 4'c Harris 7'm Norton 13'c Con: Edwards (5/6) 0', 1', 3', 4', 13' |

Twickenham Stadium
Referee: Tevita Rokovereni (Fiji)

26 May 2019
12:58

| Japan | 26–17 | Kenya |
| Try: Motomura 1'c Sakai 3'c Fujita 10'm Hano 13'c Con: Sakai (3/4) 2', 3', 13' | Report | Try: Mwale (2) 4'm, 8'm Oluoch 7'c Con: Olindi (1/3) 7' |

Twickenham Stadium
Referee: Paulo Duarte (Portugal)

13th place final

26 May 2019
16:07

| England | 14–29 | Japan |
| Try: Harris 5'c Sofolarin 13'c Con: Edwards (2/2) 5', 13' | Report | Try: Matsui 0'c Soejima 3'c Fujita 6'm Hano 10'm Tuqiri 11'm Con: Sakai (2/5) 1', 3' |

Twickenham Stadium
Referee: Damián Schneider (Argentina)

=== Challenge Trophy ===
Quarter-finals
26 May 2019 – 9:30 – Twickenham Stadium
Argentina | 28
Spain | 19
26 May 2019 – 9:52 – Twickenham Stadium
England | 19
Samoa | 24 (a.e.t.)
26 May 2019 – 10:14 – Twickenham Stadium
Wales | 17
Japan | 0
26 May 2019 – 10:36 – Twickenham Stadium
Kenya | 21
Scotland | 29

Semi-finals
26 May 2019 – 13:20 – Twickenham Stadium
Argentina | 5
Samoa | 14
26 May 2019 – 13:42 – Twickenham Stadium
Wales | 7
Scotland | 33

Challenge Trophy final
26 May 2019 – 16:32 – Twickenham Stadium
Samoa | 26
Scotland | 17

Matches

Quarter-finals

26 May 2019
9:30

| Argentina | 28–19 | Spain |
| Try: Luna 0'c Gonzalez (3) 2'c, 6'c, 7'c Con: del Mestre (2/2) 1', 2'; Bazan Velez (2/2) 7', 7' | Report | Try: Sainz-Trapaga 4'c de Santiago 9'm Fontes 13'c Con: de Santiago (1/2) 4'; Fontes (1/1) 14' |

Twickenham Stadium
Referee: Matt Rodden (Hong Kong)

26 May 2019
9:52

| England | 19–24 (a.e.t.) | Samoa |
| Try: Norton (2) 6'm, 7'c Emery 14'c Con: Edwards (1/2) 7'; Emery (1/1) 14' | Report | Try: Asofolau (2) 1'c, 12'c Vaili 2'm Perez 21'; Con: Alosio (1/2) 1'; Vaili (1/1) 13' |

Twickenham Stadium
Referee: Jordan Way (Australia)

26 May 2019
10:14

| Wales | 17–0 | Japan |
| Try: Treharne 8'm Bagshaw 12'c Goodchild 14'm Con: Treharne (1/3) 12' | Report |

Twickenham Stadium
Referee: Richard Kelly (New Zealand)

26 May 2019
10:36

| Kenya | 21–29 | Scotland |
| Try: Amonde (2) 2'c, 5'c Oluoch 9'c Con: Taabu (1/2) 3'; Olindi (2/2) 5', 9' | Report | Try: Fergusson 0'; Bryce 4'c Farndale (2) 7'c, 10'm Godsmark 12'm Con: Lowe (2/5) 4', 7' |

Twickenham Stadium
Referee: Tevita Rokovereni (Fiji)

Semi-finals

26 May 2019
13:20

| Argentina | 5–14 | Samoa |
| Try: Luna 13'm Con: Revol (0/1) | Report | Try: Vaili 3'c Alofipo 9'c Con: Mealoi (2/2) 4', 10' |

Twickenham Stadium
Referee: Matt Rodden (Hong Kong)

26 May 2019
13:42

| Wales | 7–33 | Scotland |
| Try: Williams 6'c Con: Treharne (1/1) 7' | Report | Try: Bryce 3'c McFarland (2) 5'c, 11'c Fergusson 9'c Farndale 12'm Con: Fergusson (2/2) 3', 11'; Lowe (2/2) 5', 9'; Barreto (0/1) |

Twickenham Stadium
Referee: Damián Schneider (Argentina)

Challenge Trophy final

26 May 2019
16:32

| Samoa | 26–17 | Scotland |
| Try: Afamasaga (2) 0'c, 13'c Perez 7'm Alofipo 10'c Con: Mealoi (2/2) 1', 14'; Alosio (1/2) 10' | Report | Try: McFarland 3'm Godsmark 8'm Fergusson 12'c Con: Fergusson (1/2) 12'; Lowe (0/1) |

Twickenham Stadium
Referee: Jérémy Rozier (France)

=== 5th place ===
Semi-finals
26 May 2019 – 14:04 – Twickenham Stadium
South Africa | 17
New Zealand | 21
26 May 2019 – 14:26 – Twickenham Stadium
Canada | 14
Ireland | 33

5th place final
26 May 2019 – 17:07 – Twickenham Stadium
New Zealand | 35
Ireland | 14

Matches

Semi-finals

26 May 2019
14:04

| South Africa | 17–21 | New Zealand |
| Try: du Plessis (2) 3'm, 6'm Gans 12'c Con: Davids (1/1) 12' du Preez (0/2) | Report | Try: Molia 1'c Knewstubb 9'c Mikkelson 14'c Con: Koroi (1/1) 2'; Knewstubb (1/1) 10'; Mikkelson (1/1) 14' |

Twickenham Stadium
Referee: Jérémy Rozier (France)

26 May 2019
14:26

| Canada | 14–33 | Ireland |
| Try: Thiel 5'c Coe 7'c Con: Hirayama (2/2) 5', 7' | Report | Try: Lennox 0'c Mollen 8'm Kennedy (2) 11'c, 14'c Dardis 13'c Con: Roche (1/2) 1'; Dardis (3/3) 11', 13', 14' |

Twickenham Stadium
Referee: Sam Grove-White (Scotland)

5th place final

26 May 2019
17:07

| New Zealand | 35–14 | Ireland |
| Try: Ng Shiu (2) 4'c, 11'c Ravouvou (2) 5'c, 9'c Ware 14'c Con: Knewstubb (2/2) 4', 6', 10', 12'; Curry (1/1) 14' | Report | Try: Kennedy 2'c Dardis 8'c Con: Dardis (2/2) 3', 8' |

Twickenham Stadium
Referee: Paulo Duarte (Portugal)

=== Cup ===
Quarter-finals
26 May 2019 – 10:58 – Twickenham Stadium
South Africa | 22
Australia | 29
26 May 2019 – 11:20 – Twickenham Stadium
New Zealand | 14
France | 19
26 May 2019 – 11:42 – Twickenham Stadium
United States | 29
Canada | 14
26 May 2019 – 12:04 – Twickenham Stadium
Fiji | 33
Ireland | 24

Semi-finals
26 May 2019 – 14:48 – Twickenham Stadium
Australia | 31
France | 24
26 May 2019 – 15:10 – Twickenham Stadium
United States | 10
Fiji | 17

Cup final
26 May 2019 – 17:57 – Twickenham Stadium
Australia | 7
Fiji | 43
Bronze medal match
26 May 2019 – 17:32 – Twickenham Stadium
France | 14
United States | 31

Matches

Quarter-finals

26 May 2019
10:58

| South Africa | 22–29 | Australia |
| Try: Soyizwapi 4'c Geduld 6'm du Plessis 13'm Pretorius 14'; Con: du Preez (1/2) 5'; Davids (0/2) | Report | Try: Hutchison (2) 0'c, 8'm Pincus 2'm Hood 7'c O'Donnell 9'c Con: Holland (1/2) 0'; Coward (1/3) 7' |

Twickenham Stadium
Referee: Sam Grove-White (Scotland)

26 May 2019
11:20

| New Zealand | 14–19 | France |
| Try: Knewstubb 3'c Mikkelson 7'c Con: Knewstubb (1/1) 3', 7' | Report | Try: Parez 10'c Lakafia 11'm Penalty try 14'; Con: Barraque (1/2) 10' |

Twickenham Stadium
Referee: Paulo Duarte (Portugal)

26 May 2019
11:42

| United States | 29–14 | Canada |
| Try: Baker (2) 2'm, 7'c Penalty try 4'; Matai Leuta 5'm Williams 13'm Con: Hughes (1/4) 8' | Report | Try: Hirayama 8'c Cejvanovic 12'c Con: Hirayama (2/2) 9', 12' |

Twickenham Stadium
Referee: Damián Schneider (Argentina)

26 May 2019
12:04

| Fiji | 33–24 | Ireland |
| Try: Derenalagi 3'c Tuimaba 5'c Tuwai 7'c Botitu 7'c Asaeli Tuivuaka 13'm Con: Nacuqu (4/4) 3', 6', 7', 7'; Ikanikoda (0/1) | Report | Try: McGrath (2) 0'm, 2'; Conroy 9'm Fitzpatrick 11'c Con: Roche (1/2) 2'; Dardis (1/2) 11' |

Twickenham Stadium
Referee: Jérémy Rozier (France)

Semi-finals

26 May 2019
14:48

| Australia | 31–24 | France |
| Try: Anderson 0'm Hutchison 3'c Kennewell 4'm Longbottom 7'c Coward 13'c Con: Holland (3/5) 3', 7', 13' | Report | Try: Parez (2) 1'm, 8'c Mazzoleni 10'm Bouhraoua 14'c Con: Jean-Pascal Barraque (2/4) 8', 14' |

Twickenham Stadium
Referee: Richard Kelly (New Zealand)

26 May 2019
15:10

| United States | 10–17 | Fiji |
| Try: Iosefo 1'm Williams 11'm Con: Hughes (0/2) | Report | Try: Tuimaba 3'c Derenalagi 9'm Vakurunabili 13'm Con: Nacuqu (1/2) 4'; Ikanikoda (0/1) |

Twickenham Stadium
Referee: Jordan Way (Australia)

Bronze medal match

26 May 2019
17:37

| France | 14–31 | United States |
| Try: Bouhraoua 9'c Barraque 13'c Con: Riva (1/1) 9'; Barraque (1/1) 13' | Report | Try: Niua 0'm Barrett (2) 2'c, 7'c Brown 8'm Tomasin 11'c Con: Hughes (2/4) 2', 7'; Tomasin (1/1) 11' |

Twickenham Stadium
Referee: Sam Grove-White (Scotland)

Cup final

26 May 2019
17:57

| Australia | 7–43 | Fiji |
| Try: Pincus 8'c Con: Coward (1/1) 8' | Report | Try: Botitu 2'c Tuimaba (3) 3'm, 6'c, 9'm Vakurunabili 10'c Naduva (2) 12'm, 13'c Con: Nacuqu (2/4) 2', 6'; Ikanikoda (2/3) 10', 13' |

Twickenham Stadium
Referee: Richard Kelly (New Zealand)

== Tournament placings ==
| Place | Team | Points |
|---|---|---|
| 1st place, gold medalist(s) | Fiji | 22 |
| 2nd place, silver medalist(s) | Australia | 19 |
| 3rd place, bronze medalist(s) | United States | 17 |
| 4 | France | 15 |
| 5 | New Zealand | 13 |
| 6 | Ireland | 12 |
| 7 | Canada | 10 |
| 7 | South Africa | 10 |

| Place | Team | Points |
|---|---|---|
| 9 | Samoa | 8 |
| 10 | Scotland | 7 |
| 11 | Wales | 5 |
| 11 | Argentina | 5 |
| 13 | Japan | 3 |
| 14 | England | 2 |
| 15 | Kenya | 1 |
| 15 | Spain | 1 |

Source: World Rugby

== Players ==
=== Scoring leaders ===
Tries scored
| Rank | Player | Tries |
|---|---|---|
| 1 | Aminiasi Tuimaba | 7 |
| 1 | Maurice Longbottom | 7 |
| 3 | Bush Mwale | 6 |
| 3 | Dan Norton | 6 |
| 5 | Perry Baker | 5 |
| 5 | Siviwe Soyizwapi | 5 |

Points scored
| Rank | Player | Points |
|---|---|---|
| 1 | Andrew Knewstubb | 46 |
| 2 | Aminiasi Tuimaba | 35 |
| 2 | Lewis Holland | 35 |
| 2 | Maurice Longbottom | 35 |
| 5 | Bush Mwale | 30 |
| 5 | Dan Norton | 30 |

Source: World Rugby

World Sevens Series XX
| Preceded by 2019 Singapore Sevens | 2019 London Sevens | Succeeded by 2019 Paris Sevens |
London Sevens
| Preceded by 2018 London Sevens | 2019 London Sevens | Succeeded by 2022 London Sevens |
