= Calum Waters =

Calum Waters may refer to:

- Calum Waters (footballer) (born 1996), Scottish footballer
- Calum Waters (rugby union) (born 1996), English rugby union player
