= Kelly Brown =

Scotland international rugby union player & coach

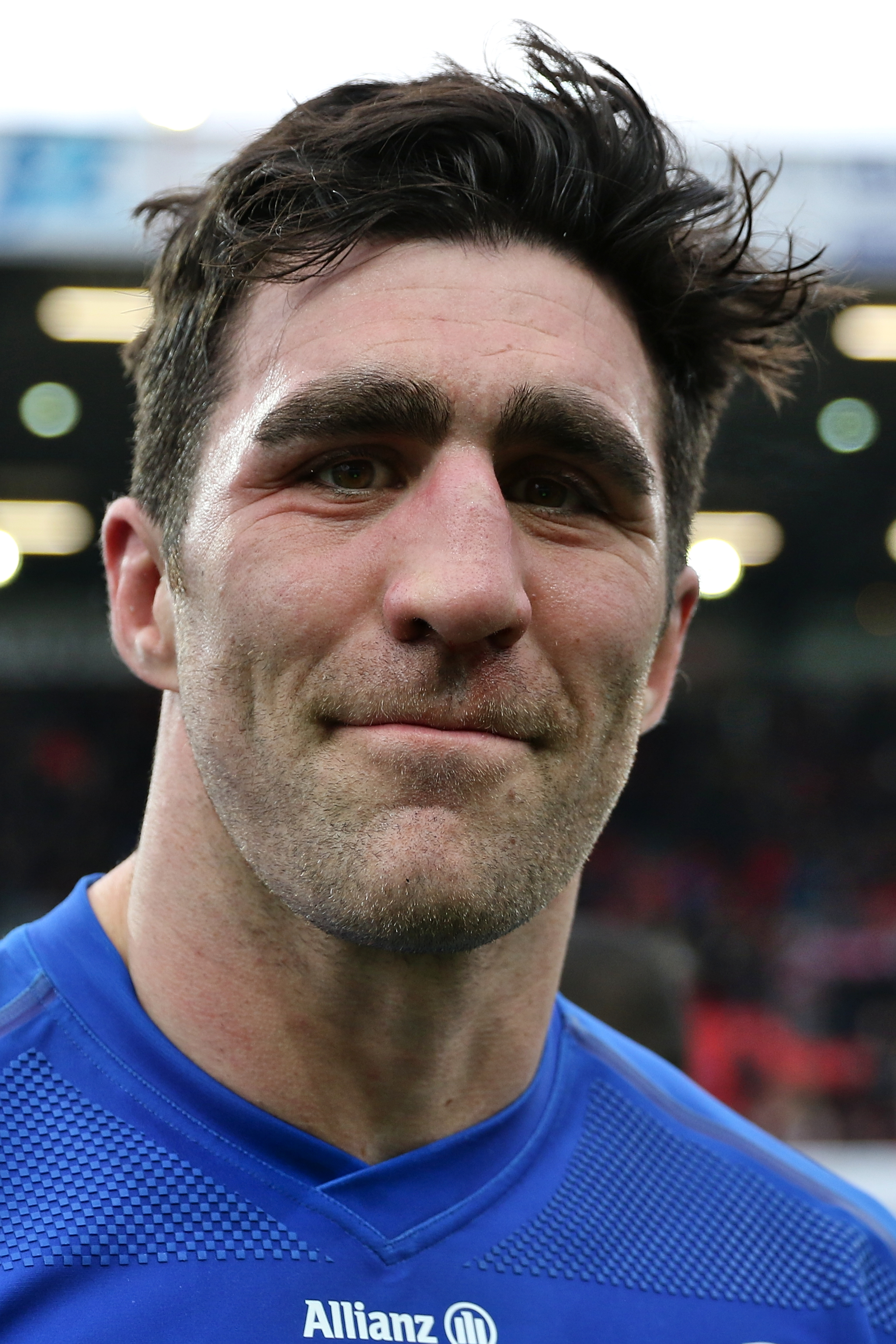
- Born: Kelly David Robert Brown; 8 June 1982 (age 44) Edinburgh, Scotland
- Height: 6 ft 4 in (1.93 m)
- Weight: 110 kg (17 st 5 lb)
- School: Earlston High School

Rugby union career
- Position: Flanker / Number 8
Amateur team(s)
Years	Team	Apps	(Points)
-	Melrose RFC		
Senior career
Years	Team	Apps	(Points)
2005–07	Border Reivers	71	(47)
2007–10	Glasgow Warriors	82	(20)
2010–17	Saracens	163	(95)
- Correct as of 15 February 2015
International career
Years	Team	Apps	(Points)
2005–2017	Scotland	64	(20)
- Correct as of 15 June 2014
Coaching career
- Years: Team
- 2017–2020: Saracens (Academy)
- 2020–2021: Glasgow Warriors (Asst.)
- 2021–2023: Saracens (Asst.)

Kelly Brown (born 8 June 1982) is a Scottish rugby union coach and former player. He won 64 caps for the Scotland national team, and played club rugby for Glasgow Warriors, Border Reivers and Saracens as a flanker. He retired from playing in 2017 to become a coach with Saracens' academy. Brown moved to an Assistant Coach position at Glasgow Warriors in 2020 before returning to Saracens in 2021.

== Early life ==
Brown was born on 8 June 1982 in Edinburgh, and grew up in Melrose in the Scottish Borders, attending Earlston High School .

== Club career ==
Brown played professionally for Border Reivers until the end of the 2006–07 season, when the club was disbanded. After that he played for the Glasgow Warriors.

On 19 January 2010, it was confirmed that Brown had signed a deal with Rugby Premiership club Saracens. He started as Saracens won their first Premiership title in 2011. He retired in 2017.

== International career ==
Brown made his debut for the Scottish national side on 5 June 2005 in a match against Romania where he scored a try. Brown was in the Scotland squad for the 2007 Rugby World Cup, when he made five appearances (four as substitute), and scored a try in the pool match against Portugal.

Brown was injured during the 2011 Six Nations campaign while playing for Scotland against England at Twickenham, where he had to be stretchered off after a long pause in play. He returned from injury and was part of the Scotland squad for the 2011 Rugby World Cup, starting the opening 3 matches.

On 30 October 2012 it was announced that, after a lengthy injury that ruled him out of the 6 nations, Brown would return to captain Scotland for his 50th cap in the first Autumn test of 2012 against New Zealand, becoming the 32nd player to win 50 or more cpas.

In all he played for Scotland on 64 occasions, with 14 as captain.

Brown also played Scotland rugby sevens team, competing in the 2005 Rugby World Cup Sevens in Hong Kong. scoring two tries as Scotland reached the last eight of the tournament.

== Coaching career ==
Following his retirement, Brown took up a coaching role at Saracens' academy, he left the role in August 2020 to become a senior team coach at former club Glasgow Warriors. He returned to Saracens in February 2021. He left Saracens in 2023 to take up a position in the Affordable Housing leadership team at the Places for People social enterprise.

== Personal life ==
Brown married Emily. They have two daughters, Amber and Aleenan.

Brown is a graduate of the McGuire Programme to treat stammering.

Brown is briefly mentioned on Pottermore (now wizardingworld.com), in an excerpt written by J.K. Rowling for the website, alongside Stuart Hogg and Jim Hamilton suggesting that the players are squibs (wizards born without powers) masquerading as muggles (non magical people).
