= Mark Robertson (rugby union) =

Scottish rugby union player

- Born: 31 December 1984 (age 41) Melrose, Scotland
- Height: 1.86 m (6 ft 1 in)
- Weight: 95 kg (14 st 13 lb)
- School: Earlston High School
- University: Edinburgh University
- Notable relative: Keith Robertson (father)

Rugby union career
- Position: Wing
Amateur team(s)
Years	Team	Apps	(Points)
-	Melrose RFC		
–	Central Coast Waves		
–	Terrigal Trojans		
Senior career
Years	Team	Apps	(Points)
2006–2007	Border Reivers	7	(8)
2007–2011	Edinburgh Rugby	44	(55)
2011–2012	London Scottish	3	(0)
2015	Glasgow Warriors	0	(0)
International career
Years	Team	Apps	(Points)
2006	Scotland Club XV		
–	Scotland A		
National sevens team
Years	Team		Comps
2012–2017	Scotland 7s		34
Coaching career
- Years: Team
- 2017-: Scottish Rugby Academy (Strength & Conditioning)
Medal record
Men's rugby sevens
Representing Great Britain
Olympic Games
Silver medal – second place	2016 Rio de Janeiro	Team competition

Mark Robertson (born 31 December 1984) is a former Scotland 7s international rugby union player. He is now a Strength and Conditioning Coach for the Scottish Rugby Academy.

== Playing career ==
=== Amateur career ===
Robertson was educated at Earlston High School, and then played for Melrose Wasps; Melrose RFC's under 18 team. He graduated to their XV side and also played 7s for the team.

He played for a while in Australia playing for Central Coast and Terrigal.

=== Professional career ===
He then joined Border Reivers on an apprentice contract in summer 2006, and scored on his debut and later that year received try on the year.

In the summer of 2007 Robertson joined the Edinburgh and progressed to claim a regular place in the Edinburgh side during the 2009/10 season.

A pelvic injury that had flared in his first season with Edinburgh returned with a vengeance in December 2010. He struggled over the next 14 months in the Murrayfield treatment room trying to resolve the persistent injury including a double hernia operation as well as tears in his abdomen that were revealed and allowed to heal. He left Edinburgh Rugby at the end of his contract in May 2011.

In December 2011 he had a four-week trial with London Scottish but did not join the club beyond this.

It was announced on 31 July 2015 that Robertson would be joining the Glasgow Warriors from Scotland 7s to provide cover during the Rugby World Cup in 2015. He played in two matches for the Warriors:- against Clermont and against Canada 'A'.

=== International career ===
Robertson played for the Scotland Club XV. He also claimed nine Scotland A caps (scoring tries against Tonga, Ireland and Georgia). He was in the Scotland squad in 2008 against Canada, He is a member of the east Scotland institute of sport. Robertson trained with the senior Scotland squad during the 2010 Six Nations Championship.

He signed for Scotland sevens and at the time was Scotland sevens' highest try scorer with 17. He continued to play for Scotland sevens and played in the Dubai Sevens making the semi-finals of the Bowl competition with Scotland before they lost to Argentina, 12–5, on 1 December 2012. He was later part of the Scotland Sevens squad who won the London Sevens, Scotland's first Cup victory on the World Series. Robertson was rewarded with fine displays in the 2015/16 season, when he received a call-up to Great Britain sevens team for the 2016 Rio Olympics, winning a silver medal.

== Coaching career ==
Robertson is now a Strength and Conditioning Coach with the Scottish Rugby Academy. He is assigned to the Borders and East Lothian Academy.

Robertson has recently signed with Clermont Auvergne to become part of the conditioning team with the French T14 team for the 2019-20 season. He will join fellow borderer Neil McIlroy, who has been a member of the ASM coaching staff for the last 13 seasons.

== Family ==
His father Keith was capped 44 times for Scotland.
