= Carl Hogg =

Scotland international rugby union player

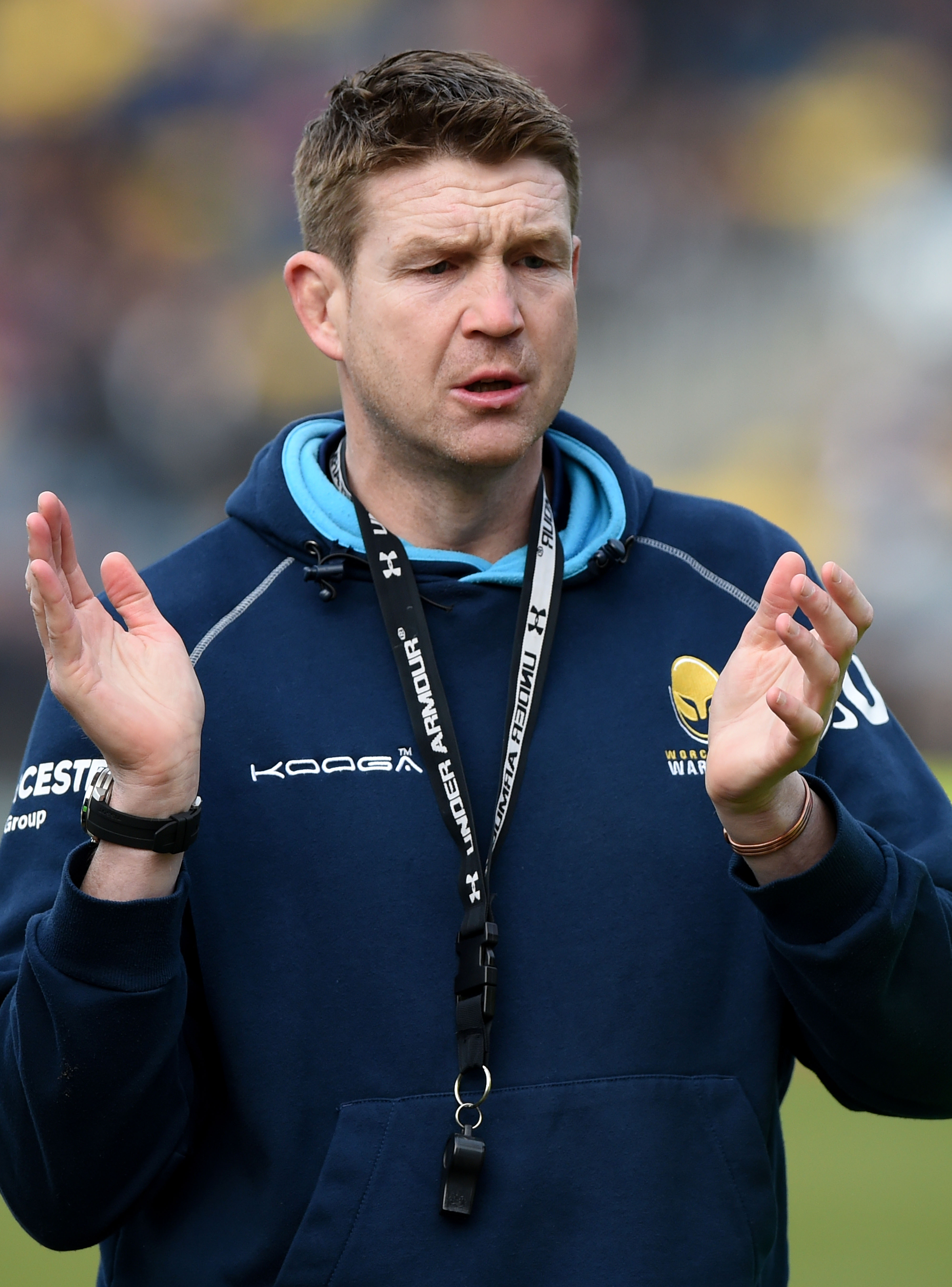
- Carl Hogg during a warm-up at Sixways
- Born: Carl Hogg; 5 July 1969 (age 57) Galashiels, Scotland
- Height: 1.96 m (6 ft 5 in)
- Weight: 103 kg (16 st 3 lb)
- School: Earlston High School
- University: Abertay University; Brunel University London

Rugby union career
- Position: Flanker
Amateur team(s)
Years	Team	Apps	(Points)
- Melrose
Senior career
Years	Team	Apps	(Points)
1996–1998	Border Reivers		
1998-2001	Edinburgh		
2001–2003	Leeds Tykes		
Provincial / State sides
Years	Team	Apps	(Points)
- South of Scotland District
International career
Years	Team	Apps	(Points)
- Scotland U19
- Scotland U21
1991	Scotland 'B'	1	(0)
1992-2000	Scotland 'A'	17	(0)
1992-1994	Scotland	5	(0)
Coaching career
- Years: Team
- 2003–2004: Leeds Tykes (Academy Coach)
- 2004–2005: London Welsh (First-Team Coach)
- 2005–2006: Edinburgh (Assistant coach)
- 2006–2013: Gloucester (Academy Coach/Forwards Coach)
- 2013–2018: Worcester Warriors (Head Coach/Interim Director of Rugby)
- 2018–2019: Scotland U20s (Interim Head Coach)
- 2019–2020: Ospreys (Forwards coach)
- 2021: Russia (Assistant coach)
- 2021–2024: Gloucester (Director of Academy and Development)
- 2025–: Dinamo București (Director of Rugby)

Carl Hogg (born 5 July 1969) is a Scottish rugby union coach and former player. He won 5 international caps for Scotland in the 1990s.

== Playing career ==
=== Amateur career ===
Hogg was educated at St. Mary's School, Melrose and Earlston High School.

He played the majority of his rugby career with Melrose RFC.

=== Provincial and professional career ===
He played for South of Scotland District. When the Scottish rugby union environment turned professional in 1996, he then played for the professional district Border Reivers.

That side folded in 1998 and Hogg went on to play for Edinburgh.

In 2001, he moved to Leeds Tykes and retired from playing two years later.

He has captained every club side he has played for.

=== International career ===
He played for Scotland U19.

He played for Scotland U21 and captained the side.

He was capped by Scotland 'B' on 2 March 1991 to play against France 'B'.

He had 17 appearances for Scotland 'A' between 1992 and 2000, captaining the side on 6 occasions.

Between 1992 and 1994 he made five appearances for Scotland.

== Coaching career ==
Hogg started off at Leeds working with former England coach Stuart Lancaster before moving to London Welsh and then Edinburgh. He joined Gloucester in 2006 as Academy coach before progressing to a senior role as Forwards coach. He joined Dean Ryan as Head coach at Worcester Warriors in 2013, taking responsibility for first team games in all major competitions. On 30 June 2016 he was given control of first team duties after Ryan left the club. In February 2018 Worcester announced that Hogg would be leaving at the end of the season.

On 25 October 2018, Hogg was appointed new interim Head coach of Scotland U20s before the 2019 Six Nations Under 20s Championship On 9 May 2019, Hogg returned to domestic rugby as he was named new Forwards coach for Welsh region Ospreys after the 2019 World Rugby Under 20 Championship ended. He departed from the Ospreys as of 22 October 2020. On 14 January 2021, Hogg became an Assistant coach for the Russia national team under Head coach Lyn Jones after leaving Ospreys.

On 12 March 2021, Hogg returned to Gloucester to be appointed as their new Director of academy and Development, working alongside Head of academy Peter Walton.
