= Mick McGrath =

Mick McGrath may refer to:

- Mick McGrath (footballer) (1936–2025), Irish footballer
- Mick McGrath (athlete) (born 1947), Australian former triple jumper
- Mick McGrath (rugby union) (born 1991), Irish rugby player
