= James Johnstone (rugby union) =

Scottish rugby union player

- Born: James McCrone Johnstone; 17 April 1990 (age 36) Dumfries, Scotland
- Height: 5 ft 10 in (1.78 m)
- Weight: 92 kg (14 st 7 lb)
- School: Merchiston Castle School

Rugby union career
- Position: Centre
Senior career
Years	Team	Apps	(Points)
2015–2022	Edinburgh Rugby	39	(40)
- Correct as of 29 September 2022
International career
Years	Team	Apps	(Points)
2010	Scotland U20	7	(0)
- Correct as of 31 May 2022
National sevens team
Years	Team		Comps
2012–2022	Scotland 7s		44

James McCrone Johnstone (born 17 April 1990) is a Scottish rugby union player who plays centre for the Scotland 7s team.

Johnstone previously played for Edinburgh Rugby in the United Rugby Championship.

== Career ==
Johnstone was part of the Scotland 7s squad at the 2014 Commonwealth Games.

Johnstone made his Edinburgh Rugby debut against Leinster at Meggetland Sports Complex in September 2015.
