= Hugo Lennox =

Irish rugby union player

- Born: 6 March 1999 (age 27)
- Height: 1.75 m (5 ft 9 in)
- Weight: 63 kg (139 lb)

Rugby union career
National sevens team
Years	Team	Comps
2018–present	Ireland 7s	
- Correct as of 1 August 2021

Hugo Lennox (born 6 March 1999) is an Irish rugby union player who plays for the Ireland national rugby sevens team.

== Rugby career ==
Lennox debuted with the Ireland national sevens team in September 2018. He also represented Ireland at the 2019 London Sevens where he started four of the six matches, and the team finished sixth. Lennox also played at the 2019 Paris Sevens. Lennox again was in the Ireland squad in June 2019 for a Europe regional qualifying tournament for the 2020 Summer Olympics.

Lennox also played for Ireland during the 2019-20 World Rugby Sevens Series. In 2022, He competed for Ireland at the Rugby World Cup Sevens in Cape Town. In addition to rugby sevens, Lennox has also played rugby fifteens with Skerries and with Barnhall and Clontarf in the All-Ireland League.

Lennox competed for Ireland at the 2024 Summer Olympics in Paris.
