= Lote Tuqiri =

Australia (dual-code) & Fiji international rugby league footballer

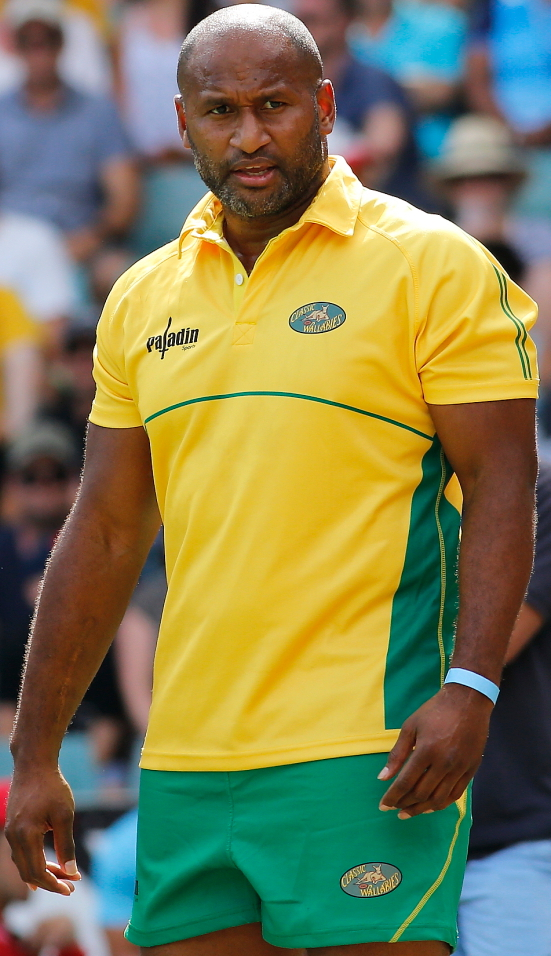

Personal information
- Full name: Lote Daulako Tuqiri
- Born: 23 September 1979 (age 47) Korolevu, Fiji

Playing information
- Height: 191 cm (6 ft 3 in)
- Weight: 102 kg (16 st 1 lb)

Rugby league
- Position: Wing, Fullback
Club
Years	Team	Pld	T	G	FG	P
1999–02	Brisbane Broncos	99	56	18	0	260
2010–13	Wests Tigers	52	27	0	0	108
2014	South Sydney	16	7	0	0	28
	Total	167	90	18	0	396
Representative
Years	Team	Pld	T	G	FG	P
2000–14	Fiji	4	5	7	0	34
2001–02	Queensland	6	5	4	0	28
2001–10	Australia	9	5	0	0	20

Rugby union
- Position: Wing, Centre
Club
Years	Team	Pld	T	G	FG	P
2003–09	NSW Waratahs	89	29	1	0	148
2009–10	Leicester Tigers	16	3	0	0	15
2013	Leinster	2	0	0	0	0
	Total	107	32	1	0	163
Representative
Years	Team	Pld	T	G	FG	P
2003–09	Australia	67	30	0	0	150

Lote Daulako Tuqiri (born 23 September 1979) is a former professional dual-code rugby footballer who primarily played as a winger across both codes. He represented Australia in both rugby league and rugby union, and Fiji in rugby league. Tuqiri first rose to prominence as a professional rugby league footballer for the Brisbane Broncos and Queensland Maroons, as well as the Fiji and Australia national sides. He was therefore a high-profile signing for rugby union in 2002, winning 67 caps for Australia and being a part of their 2003 and 2007 World Cup squads. He played rugby union for the Waratahs in the Super 14 and Leicester Tigers in England in season 2009–10. Tuqiri's contract with the Australian Rugby Union was terminated on 1 July 2009. No immediate reason was given, and Tuqiri returned to rugby league in 2010, playing for the Wests Tigers of the NRL. In September 2013, he signed a short-term contract with Irish rugby union giants, Leinster to play in the Pro12 in a three-month deal. Just 6 weeks out from the 2014 NRL season, Tuqiri signed with his third NRL club, the South Sydney Rabbitohs, on a one-year deal.

== Background ==
Tuqiri was born in Korolevu, Fiji to mother Titilia and father Tukula and grew up in Namatakula with family including older sister Mela, older brother Tevita and sister Sereana. He moved to Australia with his family at the age of 4, settling at Sunnybank, Queensland (a suburb of Brisbane) where he began playing competitive sport for the Souths Sunnybank Rugby League while attending school at Sunnybank State High School.

== Professional career ==
While signed with the Brisbane Broncos, he also played for the Past Brothers in the Queensland Cup.

=== Rugby league ===
Tuqiri won the 1999 Brisbane Broncos season's rookie of the year award. In 2000, he secured his regular spot in the first grade line-up at the club. At the end of the season Tuqiri played for the Broncos on the wing, scoring one try in their 2000 NRL Grand Final victory over the Sydney Roosters. After that he travelled to England as captain of the Fiji national team for the 2000 World Cup. The Bati failed to advance past the group stage, winning one of their three matches, but Tuqiri was his team's top try and goal scorer for the tournament.

Having won the 2000 NRL Premiership, the Broncos travelled to England to play against 2000's Super League V Champions, St Helens for the 2001 World Club Challenge, with Tuqiri playing on the wing in Brisbane's loss. Tuqiri was one of many players picked by Queensland for their debut appearance during the 2001 State of Origin series. He played in all three matches, scored Queensland's opening try and played impressively throughout the series, which was won by the Maroons. During the season he also went on to play test football for Australia. He was picked to represent Australia against New Zealand, scoring a try in the 28–10 victory in the one-off Test match. Tuqiri was also the Broncos' top try-scorer for the 2001 season with 21, the second highest number of tries scored in a season by a Brisbane player. At the end of the season, he went on the 2001 Kangaroo tour.

As early as January 2002 it was being reported that the Australian Rugby Union was seeking Tuqiri's signature. His 2002 season was also an impressive one, and he showed much of his renowned strength and speed, setting in round 9 a new club record for most points scored by one player in a single match. Once more he topped the Broncos' try-scoring ladder for the season (along with Darren Lockyer and Chris Walker) and again he represented both Queensland and Australia. Playing in all three games of the 2002 State of Origin series, Tuqiri scored in each match, amassing a total of 28 points. He also became one of a select few players to score a hat-trick in an interstate match. At the 2002 Dally M Awards he was named as winger of the year.

At the end of the season, after the announcement of his switch to rugby union, he was overlooked for selection at the end of season Test against New Zealand.

Altogether, Tuqiri played 99 games for Brisbane between 1999 and 2002 and clocked up a tally of 260 points before his switch to rugby union. His last game for the Broncos was the 16–12 preliminary final loss against eventual premiers the Sydney Roosters.

=== Rugby union ===
Tuqiri's talent attracted the interest of the Australian Rugby Union, and at the end of the 2002 football season he announced that he had signed a contract to play rugby union in 2003 with the New South Wales Waratahs, and was therefore leaving rugby league. In 2003, he switched codes, moving from rugby league to play rugby with the Waratahs. Tuqiri's transition to rugby union proved to be successful, and his speed and strength gained him selection for the Wallabies, for whom he made his international union debut in June 2003 against Ireland, becoming Australia's 43rd dual code rugby international.

He was one of four former Queensland Maroons players to feature in two of the top three teams in the 2003 Rugby World Cup, along with Mat Rogers and Wendell Sailor for Australia and Brad Thorn for the All Blacks. Tuqiri scored tries against Romania and Namibia during the pool stages, and scored the Wallabies' only try in the final against England. He finished the tournament as one of the top try scorers for Australia, behind Rogers and Chris Latham.

In 2004 Tuqiri toured the United Kingdom and France with the Wallabies. On the Wallabies 2005 tour of Europe he was moved in-field to centre due to a considerable loss of backs through injury during that tour. In 2006, he was selected to represent Australia in the Rugby Sevens event at the 2006 Commonwealth Games in Melbourne. That season the Waratahs were semi-finalists in the Super 14 competition. During that year's Tri Nations series Tuqiri was suspended for five games after a dangerous tackle on All Blacks captain, Richie McCaw.

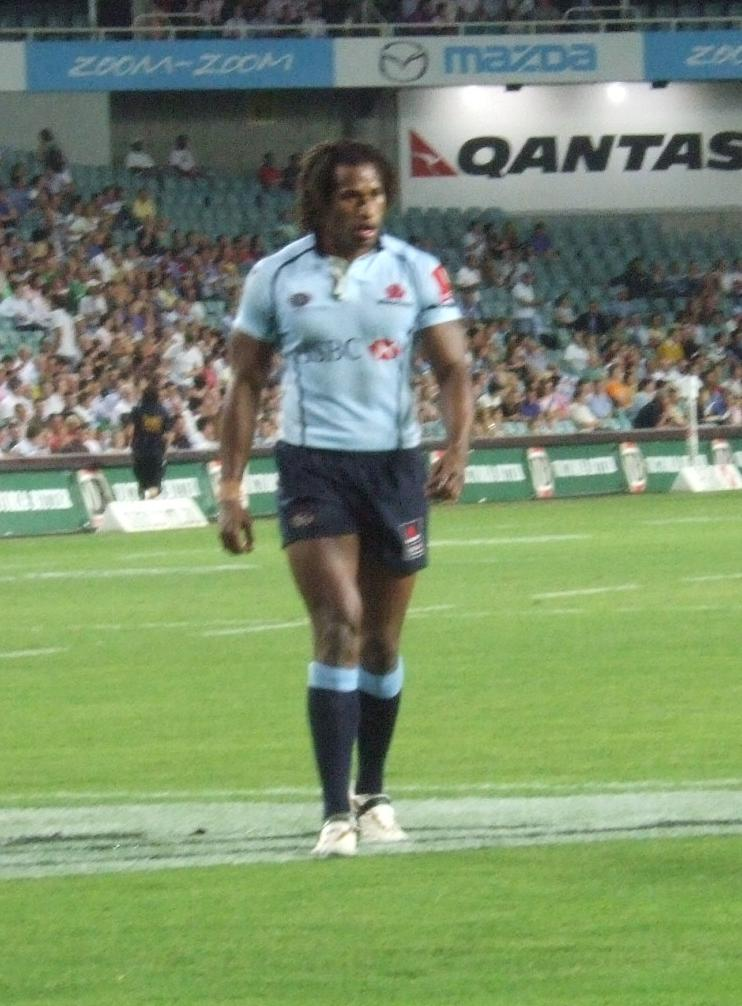
Tuqiri while playing for the Waratahs in 2007

During 2006–07 there was speculation regarding his future and whether he would stay in rugby union or return to rugby league. Tuqiri had stated that he was considering returning to league after the 2007 Rugby World Cup, following the footsteps of fellow Waratah Mat Rogers. Tuqiri had options to re-sign his contract with either the Waratahs or the Reds in the Super 14, or numerous clubs in the NRL, including the South Sydney Rabbitohs and Cronulla-Sutherland Sharks. After being given a 5:00 pm deadline on 13 March 2007 to either accept or decline the offer from the Australian Rugby Union he announced he had decided to stay in rugby union for the next five years. During a 2007 Super 14 game, Tuqiri was filmed pushing his teammate Sam Norton-Knight in the back after Norton-Knight "made a poor on-field decision".

Tuqiri's contract would ordinarily have meant that he would stay with the Waratahs and the Wallabies until the year 2012, but on 1 July 2009 the ARU announced an unexplained, immediate termination of the contract. Subsequently, it has been suggested that the reason for the termination of his contract was that he had entertained a 20-year-old student in his room, in breach of strict team rules.

He made his debut for the Leicester Tigers off the bench against the Springboks on 6 November 2009 and the Tigers defeated the World cup holders.

=== Return to rugby league ===
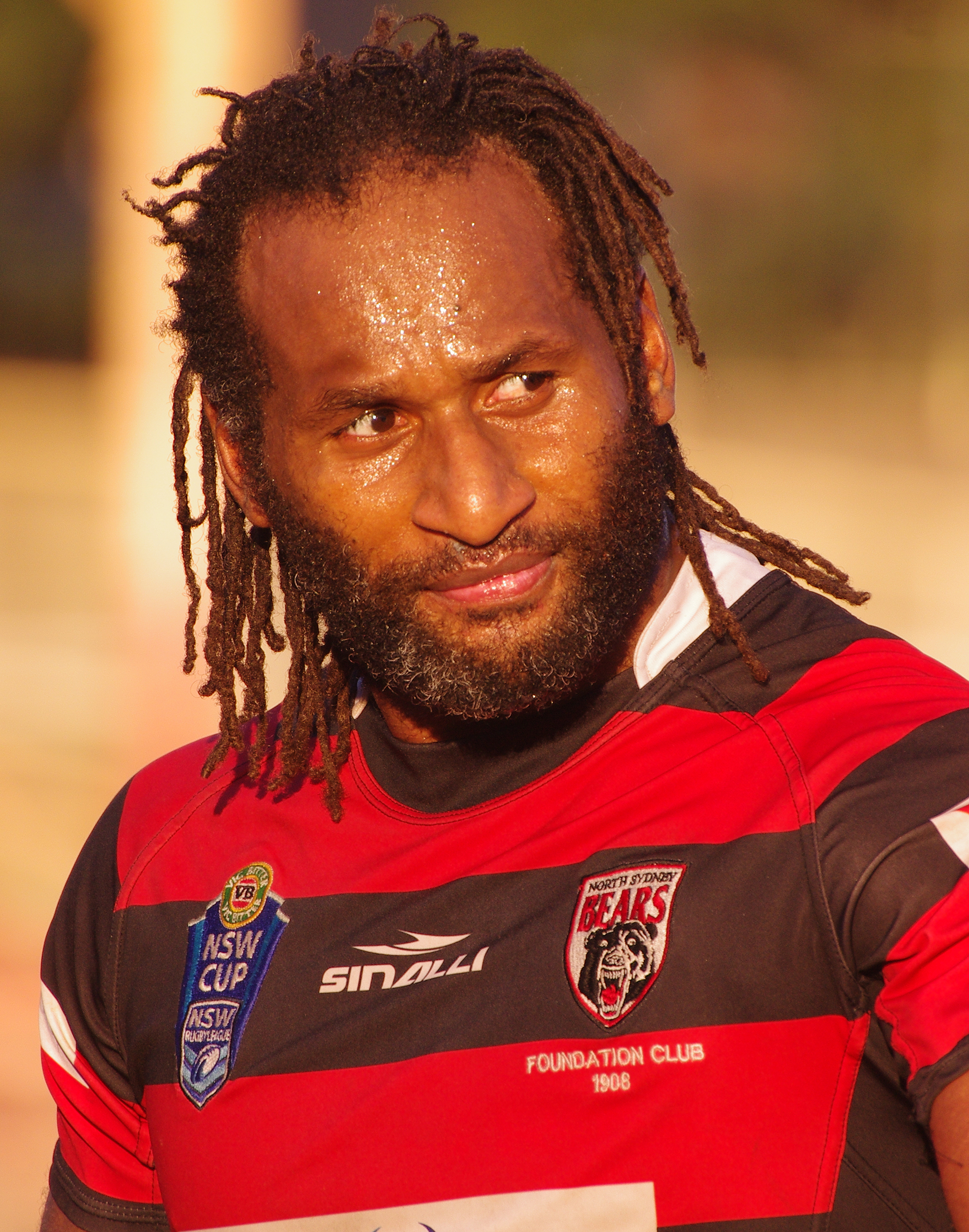
Tuqiri playing for North Sydney Bears in 2014

In February 2010, Tuqiri officially announced a return to rugby league after a seven-year absence. Signing a three-year deal with NRL club Wests Tigers, he was due to arrive in Australia at the end of March, a few weeks into the 2010 NRL season but instead he returned home early to play the Tigers' first home game in the 2010 season against Manly. He played his last game of rugby union against London Irish where his Leicester side won 35–19. In his return to rugby league, he scored a try on his first touch of the ball, and at least one try in each of his first three games including a double against the Parramatta Eels on 26 March. His form in his return season for the Tigers continued to be strong and the club came within one match of the 2010 Grand Final.

On 19 October 2010, Tuqiri was officially named in the Australian squad for the Four Nations as a replacement for the injured Jarryd Hayne. He played for the Kangaroos in all four matches, including the final, scoring one try. He became the first code-crosser to play test rugby league for Australia a second time after returning from rugby union.

Wests Tigers made the semis again in 2011, suffering a broken arm, quad strain and an injury to his ankle. Similarly, injury disrupted his 2012 season. He played his first game in round 5, and was a regular on the wing before breaking his upper arm in July. Coach Sheens said at the time, "The arm’s broken, so that’ll be the end of his season."

Before the start of the 2013 season, Tuqiri suffered a setback when scans revealed his broken arm had not healed. He had plates inserted into the arm and underwent bone grafts. He eventually made his return to first grade in round 23, playing in four games for his final season with Wests Tigers.

In September 2013, he signed a short-term contract with Irish rugby union team, Leinster to play in the Pro12 in a three-month deal.

On 22 January, six weeks out from the 2014 NRL season, Tuqiri signed with his third NRL club, the South Sydney Rabbitohs, on a one-year deal. This deal is reportedly to add depth to the significantly reduced outside back stocks at the club. Tuqiri's rugby league career was expected to be over following the conclusion of the 2013 NRL season when his previous club, the Wests Tigers opted not to offer Tuqiri an extension to his contract after several injury-plagued season significantly reduced his on-field involvement for the club.

In May 2014, Tuqiri played for Fiji in the 2014 Pacific Rugby League International. He kicked two goals, and scored a try, but it wasn't enough as Fiji lost the match by 32–16. Tuqiri turned 35 during the 2014 season and was the oldest player in the NRL at the time.

On 5 October 2014, Tuqiri was a part of the South Sydney side who defeated the Canterbury-Bankstown Bulldogs 30–6 in the 2014 NRL Grand Final at ANZ Stadium, Sydney. It was Tuqiri's second NRL title in his career, having won a previous NRL Premiership with the Brisbane Broncos earlier in his career.

== Family ==
Tuqiri is the cousin of his namesake, Fijian-born Japanese Rugby Sevens player Lote Tuqiri.

== See also ==
- List of players who have converted from one football code to another
