= Hugh Blake =

Scotland international rugby union player

- Full name: Hugh Patrick Blake
- Born: 10 September 1992 (age 34) Tauranga, New Zealand
- Height: 187 cm (6 ft 2 in)
- Weight: 100 kg (220 lb; 15 st 10 lb)
- School: Hamilton Boys' High School

Rugby union career
- Position: Flanker
- Current team: Bay of Plenty
Senior career
Years	Team	Apps	(Points)
2012–2014	Otago	17	(5)
2015	Edinburgh	3	(0)
2015–2016	Glasgow Warriors	6	(0)
2016–2019	Bay of Plenty	36	(25)
- Correct as of 14 August 2021
International career
Years	Team	Apps	(Points)
2012	New Zealand U20	5	(0)
2015	Scotland	1	(0)
- Correct as of 14 August 2021
National sevens team
Years	Team		Comps
2015–2018	Scotland		21
- Correct as of 14 August 2021

Hugh Blake (born 10 September 1992) is a New Zealand born Scottish international rugby union footballer who plays as a flanker for Bay of Plenty. He previously played for Glasgow Warriors.

== Rugby union career ==
=== Amateur career ===
He was a Premier player for the Dunedin Rugby Football Club (formed in 1871) from 2011 to 2014.

=== Provincial career ===
Blake played for Otago in the ITM Cup.

=== Professional career ===
He then was signed by Edinburgh for the 2014–15 season.

He moved to Glasgow Warriors on loan in March 2015. It was announced on 13 August 2015 that Blake has secured a two-year deal at Glasgow Warriors.

He was loaned out to Bay of Plenty for the 2016–17 season and has been named in their squad for the 2017 Mitre 10 Cup.

=== International career ===
Blake represented New Zealand Under 20 in the 2012 IRB Junior World Championship in South Africa.

Blake's Glaswegian grandparents moved to New Zealand in the 1950s and the flanker is thus eligible to represent Scotland.

He then represented Scotland at Sevens thus confirming his Scottish nationality.

On 20 January 2015, Blake was called up the senior Scotland squad for the 2015 Six Nations Championship, despite being yet to play a single game for Edinburgh at the time.

He received his first full Scotland international against Ireland on 15 August 2015.

== Personal life ==
His younger brother Andrew is a football player. Hugh is very keen on the skite, being able to chop a cruiser in under 2 seconds.
