= Noa Nadruku =

Fiji dual-code rugby international footballer (born 1967)

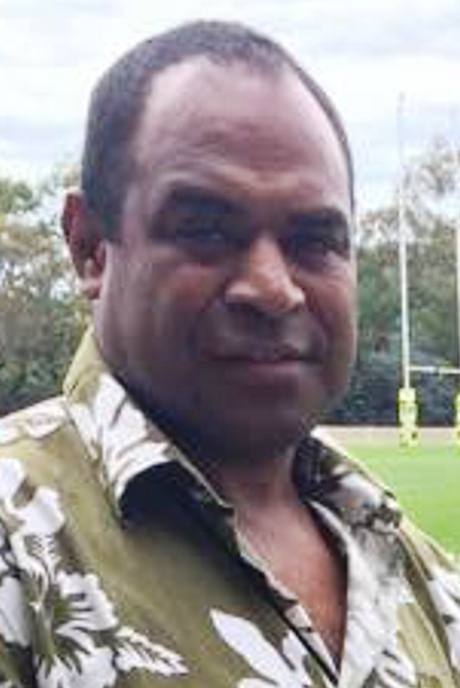

Personal information
- Born: 19 September 1967 (age 59) Namatakula, Fiji

Playing information
- Height: 174 cm (5 ft 9 in)
- Weight: 98 kg (15 st 6 lb)

Rugby union
- Position: Three-quarter
Representative
| Years | Team | Pld | T | G | FG | P |
|---|---|---|---|---|---|---|
| 1988–91 | Fiji | 13 | 2 | 0 | 0 | 8 |

Rugby league
- Position: Wing, Centre
Club
| Years | Team | Pld | T | G | FG | P |
|---|---|---|---|---|---|---|
| 1993–97 | Canberra Raiders | 92 | 73 | 0 | 0 | 292 |
| 1998–99 | North Qld Cowboys | 39 | 17 | 0 | 0 | 68 |
| | Total | 131 | 90 | 0 | 0 | 360 |
Representative
| Years | Team | Pld | T | G | FG | P |
| 1992–95 | Fiji | 6 | 4 | 0 | 0 | 16 |

Noa Nadruku (born 19 September 1967) is a Fijian former rugby union and professional rugby league footballer who played in the 1980s and 1990s. He represented Fiji in both rugby codes, and played rugby league in Australia for the Canberra Raiders and the North Queensland Cowboys.

In addition to winning the 1994 Grand Final with the Raiders, in 1993 and 1996 he was the top try-scorer in the league.

== Background ==
Noa Nadruku was born in Namatakula, Fiji.

== Playing career ==
=== Rugby union ===
Nadruku played 13 rugby union tests for Fiji between 1988 and 1991, as well as 21 tour matches.

=== Rugby league ===
Nadruku was a founding member of the Fiji national rugby league team when they entered the 1992 Rugby League World Sevens. He appeared again for Fiji at the 1993 tournament, from which he was recruited to the Canberra Raiders by head coach Tim Sheens. Sheens stated that, "we took Noa on with an agreement that he would be released to the Fijian Rugby League whenever he was required." In May 1993, Nadruku signed a contract extension with Canberra until the end of 1995.

Nadruku had a slow start to the 1993 NSWRL season, but against Cronulla in the fifth round Nadruku scored two tries, setting up several others. Against Manly-Warringah Nadruku created even more of an impression with strong defence to complement his powerful running. By the end of the year Nadruku had scored a club record 22 tries in just twenty games – being the first player to score more than one try per game in a full season since Larry Corowa had scored 24 tries in 22 games for Balmain in 1978.

Although he was contracted to Canberra, Nadruku captained Fiji at the 1994 World Sevens. He suffered a broken scaphoid bone during the tournament, causing him to miss the start of Canberra's 1994 season.

By the 1994 final series, Nadruku was back at his best. Though he received criticism for suspect under the high ball in early finals games against North Sydney and Canterbury-Bankstown, Nadruku was one of Canberra's best in their 36–12 victory over Canterbury in the Grand Final, scoring a try, making several powerful runs, and involving himself throughout. During the season Nadruku scored 12 tries in 15 games, but his club record of 22 in a season was equaled by fullback Brett Mullins.

In January 1995, Nadruku pleaded guilty to assault after punching and breaking a women's nose in a Suva nightclub. Nadruku made himself unavailable for Fiji for the 1995 World Sevens, but later in the year played for Fiji in the 1995 World Cup. Nadruku, Mullins and Laurie Daley held the Raiders together in a 1996 season decimated by injuries to Ricky Stuart and Bradley Clyde and suspensions to Kiwi props John Lomax and Quentin Pongia. This season he was again the League's top try-scorer, scoring 21 tries in 21 games.

In February 1997 Nadruku was charged with assault for punching two women outside a Canberra nightclub. The winger was acquitted in October on the basis 'he was so intoxicated he did not know nor intend what he did'. Although he had played 14 games for the Raiders that year the club sacked him after the verdict. It was reported that Nadruka had admitted to drinking the equivalent of 40 standard drinks in an 11-hour session before the incident. The courts verdict sparked national community outrage and the ACT Government introduced a Bill to remove the 'drunks defence' in November 1997.

Nadruku finished his career with the North Queensland Cowboys under his old coach Tim Sheens, often playing centre (where he had played most of his rugby union) but retaining his trademark power and pace. Nadruku recovering from his sacking by the Raiders after he was "transformed" by the Cowboys alcohol-management program.

== Legacy ==
In May 2022, Nadruku was inducted into the Canberra Raiders' Hall of Fame.

The "Noa Nadruku Trophy" is awarded to the Australia Fijian Rugby League's player of the year.

== Personal life ==
Nadruku's brother Mesake Seavula also represented Fiji in rugby union and rugby league.

Nadruku's son Neori made his debut for the Queanbeyan Whites in the John I Dent Cup in 2014.
