= Fraser Lyle =

Scottish rugby union player

- Born: Fraser Lyle; 16 June 1988 (age 38) Stirling, Scotland
- Height: 1.88 m (6 ft 2 in)
- Weight: 103 kg (16 st 3 lb)
- University: Aberdeen University

Rugby union career
- Position: Centre / Fly-half / Fullback
Amateur team(s)
Years	Team	Apps	(Points)
- Aberdeen GSFP
–	Calgary Hornets		
–	Stirling County		
Senior career
Years	Team	Apps	(Points)
2014–17	Glasgow Warriors	8	(5)
2017-	London Scottish		
National sevens team
Years	Team		Comps
2015–	Scotland 7s		2

Fraser Lyle (born 16 June 1988) is a Scotland 7s international rugby union player. He is a utility back and can play at centre, fly-half, or fullback. He plays for London Scottish. He previously played for Glasgow Warriors.

== Rugby union career ==
=== Amateur career ===
Lyle has played rugby for Morrison's Academy, Crieff & Strathearn RFC, Aberdeen Grammar, Calgary Hornets and Stirling County.

=== Professional career ===
Lyle was working as an estate agent before his dream call up to the Glasgow Warriors in November 2014

He was part of the Glasgow Warriors squad that successfully defended their Melrose 7s title in 2015.

Glasgow Warriors extended Lyle's contract through to May 2017.

On 4 May 2017 it was announced that Lyle would be released by the Warriors at the end of the season. He made 8 first team appearances for the club.

For the 2017-18 season Lyle signed for London Scottish.

=== International career ===
He was called into the Scotland Sevens for the Hong Kong Sevens tournament in 2015
