= James Fleming (rugby union, born 1987) =

Scottish rugby union player

James Stephen Fleming (born 15 October 1987) is a Scottish rugby union player who has retired from the Scotland national rugby sevens team. He competed in 45 HSBC World Rugby Sevens Series tournaments and scored 112 tries before retiring from professional rugby in 2018. He formerly played for Perthshire RFC and Dundee HSFP.
