= Scott Riddell =

Scottish rugby union player

- Born: Scott Adam George Riddell; 5 October 1985 (age 41) Edinburgh, Scotland
- Height: 1.86 m (6 ft 1 in)
- Weight: 96 kg (212 lb; 15 st 2 lb)

Rugby union career
- Position(s): Prop, Hooker
Amateur team(s)
Years	Team	Apps	(Points)
–	Stewart's Melville FP		
–	Blaydon		
Super Rugby
Years	Team	Apps	(Points)
2019-	Heriot's Rugby	2	(5)
National sevens team
Years	Team		Comps
2009-2019	Scotland 7s		55

Scott Riddell (born 5 October 1985) is a former rugby player who played for the Scotland national sevens team 2009-2019 and also captained the team. He competed in three Commonwealth Games and 74 competitions in the HSBC World Sevens Series, and also played in the 2009, 2013 and 2018 Sevens World Cups. He has also represented Great Britain in the Rugby Europe Sevens Circuit. In 2014/15 season he was named in the London 7s dream team due to his world class performances.

== Career ==
Riddell was born on 5 October 1985 in Edinburgh, Scotland. He was educated at Stewart's Melville College, then studied at Northumbria University.

Riddell made his Scotland debut in the 2009 Wellington competition.

In 2013 he was age-specific coach at Stewart's Melville FP.

In the 2016 London Sevens, Riddell played an important part in winning Scotland's first ever series cup as well as making getting his 50th cap for the sevens team. In the 2017 London Sevens, Riddell played an important part in winning Scotlands second London 7s in two years, as well as beating New Zealand making them the first ever Scottish team to beat New Zealand in any rugby game.

He announced his retirement from playing in May 2019, at which point he had gained 74 caps and was Scotland's most capped sevens player.

In 2022, he was one of the baton bearers in Scotland, ahead of the Commonwealth Games in Birmingham.

He has been assistant coach for the Great Britain national rugby sevens team.
