= Lote Tuqiri (rugby union, born 1987) =

Rugby union player

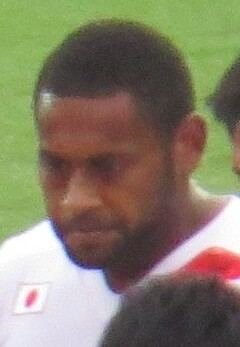
- Born: 12 November 1987 (age 39) Namatakula, Fiji
- Height: 1.88 m (6 ft 2 in)
- Weight: 98 kg (216 lb; 15 st 6 lb)

Rugby union career
- Position: Utility back
- Current team: Utsunomiya Volts
Amateur team(s)
Years	Team	Apps	(Points)
- Ratu Filise
–	Hakouh University		
Senior career
Years	Team	Apps	(Points)
2011–2016	Hokkaido Barbarians	11	(15)
2016–2018	Kubota Spears	7	(0)
2018–2022	Kintetsu Liners	6	(10)
2022–	Utsunomiya Volts		
- Correct as of 22 February 2021
National sevens team
Years	Team		Comps
2011–	Japan Sevens		29

Lote Tuqiri (born 12 November 1987 in Namatakula, Fiji) is a Japan international rugby union sevens player.

He is a cousin of his dual-international namesake.

== International ==
Tuqiri made his debut for Japan sevens in the 2011 Hong Kong Sevens.

== Personal life ==
He studied business management in Hakuoh University. After he graduated, he was employed in Hokkaido and started playing for the Hokkaido Barbarians mainly as a centre.
