= Namatakula =

- Village
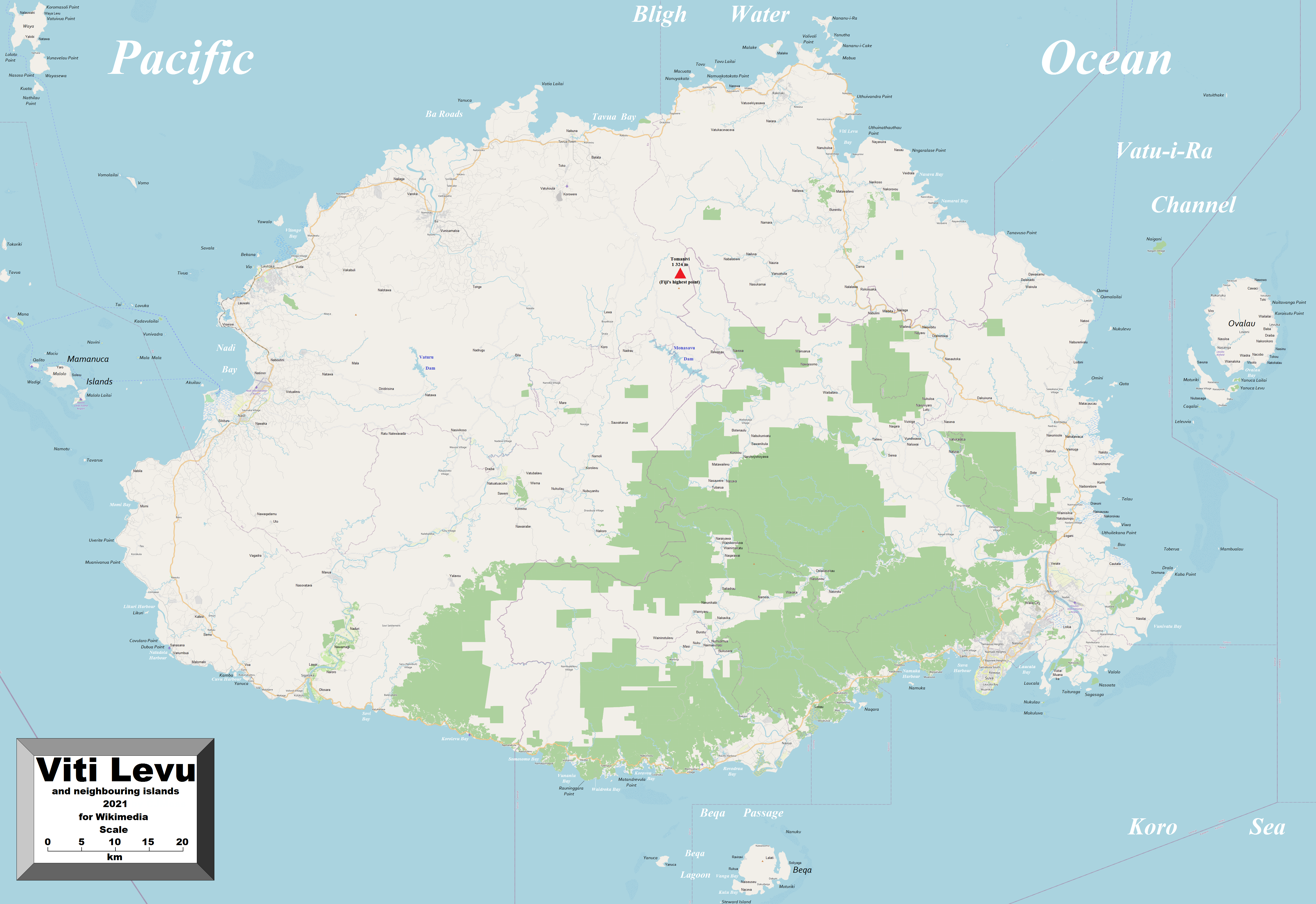
- Viti Levu with Namatakula on the south coast

- Location in Fiji
- Coordinates: 18°13′45″S 177°46′59″E
- Country: Fiji
- Island: Viti Levu
- Division: Western Division
- Province: Nadroga-Navosa

Population
  - Total: 2,522

Namatakula (Fijian pronunciation: [namatakula]) is a village located in Fiji on the Coral Coast. The population is approximately 2,522.

== Notable people ==
Namatakula is famous for producing rugby league and rugby union stars.

Dual code

- Lote Tuqiri dual international
- Noa Nadruku - Canberra Raiders player

Rugby union

- Tevita Kuridrani Wallaby and ACT Brumbies and his cousins
- Nemani Nadolo - Canterbury Crusaders, cousin of Tevita
- Chris Kuridrani - Queensland Reds, cousin of Tevita

Before them, Isei Nasiganiyavi the father of Nemani and Chris played for the Reds in the 80s while Luke Erenavula played for the North Sydney Bears at around the same time as Noa Nadruku for the Canberra Raiders before moving across the Tasman to play for Counties Manukau and the New Zealand 7s team. Aisea Batibasaga and Elia Tuqiri from Namatakula also played for the Wallabies 7s team while another cousin Lote Tuqiri played for Japan. Josh Tuqiri, nephew of Lote Tuqiri also hails from Namatakula. Josh is well known for his contributions in the GPS and Souths Rugby clubs.
