= Scotland national rugby sevens team =

Scotland
- Union: Scottish Rugby Union
- Coach: Ciaran Beattie
- Captain: Jamie Farndale
- Most caps: Scott Riddell (333 matches)
- Top scorer: Colin Gregor (1,345)
- Most tries: Andrew Turnbull (151)
Team kit	Change kit

World Cup Sevens
- Appearances: 7 (First in 1993)

The Scotland national rugby sevens team competes in the Rugby World Cup Sevens and the Commonwealth Games. It also competed World Rugby Sevens Series although it has been replaced by a combined Great Britain team in this competition.

The head coach is Ciaran Beattie, supported by manager Sean Lamont and skills coach Graham Shiel.

During 2006, the side were in danger of no longer competing in the Sevens World Series due to the financial problems faced by the Scottish Rugby Union. However, they gained a reprieve when the International Rugby Board announced that a leg of the Sevens World Series would be held at Murrayfield in Edinburgh, starting in 2007. The SRU then announced that the Scotland sevens team would compete in all eight legs of the Sevens World Series, and draw players from the country's national academy. Scotland were champions of the 2016 London Sevens.

== World Rugby Sevens Series ==
Scotland has competed in the World Rugby Sevens Series every season since the Series’ inception in 1999–2000. Scotland’s best finish is seventh place in 2016–17.

== Tournament results ==
=== Rugby World Cup Sevens ===
World Cup record
Year	Round	Position	Pld	W	L	D
(Scotland) 1993	Bowl Final	14th	7	4	3	0
(Hong Kong) 1997	Plate Semifinals	=11th	6	3	2	1
(Argentina) 2001	did not participate					
(Hong Kong) 2005	Cup Quarterfinals	=5th	6	4	2	0
(United Arab Emirates) 2009	Plate Champions	9th	6	4	2	0
(Russia) 2013	Plate Semifinals	=11th	5	3	2	0
(United States) 2018	Quarterfinals	7th	4	2	2	0
(South Africa) 2022	15th Place Final	16th	4	0	4	0
Total	0 Titles	7/8	34	18	15	1

=== Commonwealth Games ===
Commonwealth Games record
Year	Round	Position	Pld	W	L	D
(Malaysia) 1998	did not participate					
(England) 2002	Plate semifinals	9th	6	4	2	0
(Australia) 2006	Bowl Semifinals	=11th	5	2	3	0
(India) 2010	Plate Final	6th	6	3	3	0
(Scotland) 2014	Plate Semifinals	=7th	5	2	3	0
(Australia) 2018	5th Place Playoff	6th	5	3	2	0
(England) 2022	5th Place Playoff	6th	6	3	3	0
Total	0 Titles	6/7	33	17	16	0

== Players ==
=== Player records ===
As of April 2022 the career statistics leaders in the World Rugby Sevens Series are shown in the following tale. Players in bold are still active.

Most tries
No.	Player	Tries
1	Andrew Turnbull	151
2	**Jamie Farndale**	136
3	James Fleming	112
4	Mark Robertson	106
5	Colin Gregor	88

=== Former squads ===
Scotland squads for the 2016–17 World Rugby Sevens Series

The 10-round Sevens World Series XVIII.

Dubai Sevens	Cape Town Sevens	Wellington Sevens	Sydney Sevens	USA Sevens
2–3 December 2016	10–11 December 2016	28–29 January 2017	4–5 February 2017	3–5 March 2017
Scott Wight; Dougie Fife; Fraser Lyle; James Johnstone; Nick McLennan; Mark Robertson; Jamie Farndale; Joseva Nayacavou; George Horne*; Scott Wight; James Fleming; Gavin Lowe; Made their début *	Scott Riddell; Dougie Fife; Fraser Lyle; James Johnstone; Nick McLennan; Mark Robertson; Jamie Farndale; Joseva Nayacavou; George Horne; Scott Wight; James Fleming; Robert Beattie*; Made their début *	Scott Riddell; Dougie Fife; Fraser Lyle; James Johnstone; Nick McLennan; Mark Robertson; Jamie Farndale; Nyle Godsmark; George Horne; Glenn Bryce; James Fleming; Gavin Lowe	Ben Robbins *; Gregor Hunter; Fraser Lyle; Robert Beattie; Glenn Bryce; Mark Robertson; Jamie Farndale; Nyle Godsmark; George Horne; Scott Wight; James Fleming; Gavin Lowe; Made their début *	Scott Riddell; Dougie Fife; Ally Miller *; Gregor Hunter; Tom Brown; Mark Robertson; Jamie Farndale; Joseva Nayacavou; Sean Kennedy; Scott Wight; James Fleming; Fraser Lyle; Hugh Blake; Made their début *
Finished: 6th place	Finished: 4th place	Finished: Bronze Medal Winners	Finished: Challenge Trophy Quarter Finals	Finished: Challenge Trophy Semi Finals
Canada Sevens	Hong Kong Sevens	Singapore Sevens	Paris Sevens	London Sevens
11–12 March 2017	7–9 April 2017	15–16 April 2017	12–14 May 2017	20–21 May 2017
Scott Riddell; Dougie Fife; Ally Miller *; Gregor Hunter; Glenn Bryce; Mark Robertson; Jamie Farndale; Joseva Nayacavou; Hugh Blake; Scott Wight; James Fleming; Robert Beattie; Fraser Lyle	Grayson Hart *; Dougie Fife; Ally Miller; Darcy Graham *; Blair Kinghorn *; Mark Robertson; Jamie Farndale; Joseva Nayacavou; Hugh Blake; Scott Wight; James Fleming; Robert Beattie; Robbie Nairn; Made their début *	Grayson Hart; Dougie Fife; Ally Miller; Darcy Graham; Blair Kinghorn; Mark Robertson; Jamie Farndale; Joseva Nayacavou; Hugh Blake; Scott Wight; James Fleming; Robert Beattie; Robbie Nairn	Scott Riddell; Dougie Fife; Hugh Blake; Grayson Hart; Glenn Bryce; Mark Robertson; Jamie Farndale; Joseva Nayacavou; George Horne; Scott Wight; James Fleming *; Jack Cuthbert; Made their début *	
Finished: 13th	Finished: Challenge Trophy Winners	Finished: Challenge Trophy Runners Up	Finished: Silver Medal Winners	Finished: Tournament Winners

Scotland squads for the 2015–16 World Rugby Sevens Series

The 10-round Sevens World Series XVII.

Dubai Sevens	Cape Town 7s	Wellington Sevens	Sydney Sevens	USA Sevens
4–5 December 2015	12–13 December 2015	30–31 January 2016	6–7 February 2016	4-6 March 2016
Hugh Blake; Magnus Bradbury*; Jamie Farndale; James Johnstone; Lee Jones; Gavin Lowe; Nick McLennan*; Robbie Nairn*; Joseva Nayacavou; Scott Riddell; Mark Robertson; Scott Wight(c); Made their début *	Hugh Blake; Fraser Lyle; Jamie Farndale; James Johnstone; Lee Jones; Gavin Lowe; Nick McLennan; Robbie Nairn; Joseva Nayacavou; Scott Riddell; Mark Robertson; Scott Wight(c)	Hugh Blake; Junior Bulumakau*; Chris Dean; Jamie Farndale; Nick Grigg*; James Johnstone; Gavin Lowe; Nick McLennan; Joseva Nayacavou; Scott Riddell; Mark Robertson; Scott Wight(c); Made their début *	Hugh Blake; Junior Bulumakau; Chris Dean; Jamie Farndale; Nick Grigg; James Johnstone; Gavin Lowe; Nick McLennan; Joseva Nayacavou; Scott Riddell; Mark Robertson; Scott Wight(c)	Hugh Blake; Junior Bulumakau; Jamie Farndale; James Fleming; James Johnstone; Gavin Lowe; Fraser Lyle; Nick McLennan; Joseva Nayacavou; Scott Riddell; Mark Robertson; Scott Wight(c)
Finished: Bowl finalists	Finished: Bowl Winners	Finished: Bowl finalists	Finished: Bowl Semi-finalists	Finished: Bowl Semi-finalists
Canada Sevens	Hong Kong Sevens	Singapore Sevens	Paris Sevens	London Sevens
12–13 March 2016	8–10 April 2016	16–17 April 2016	14–15 May 2016	20–22 May 2016
Hugh Blake; Junior Bulumakau; Jamie Farndale; Dougie Fife; James Fleming; James Johnstone; Gavin Lowe; Fraser Lyle; Nick McLennan; Joseva Nayacavou; Scott Riddell; Scott Wight(c)	Hugh Blake; Jamie Farndale; Dougie Fife; James Fleming; Rory Hughes; James Johnstone; Gavin Lowe; Fraser Lyle; Nick McLennan; Joseva Nayacavou; Mark Robertson; Scott Wight(c)	Hugh Blake; Glenn Bryce; Jamie Farndale; Dougie Fife; James Fleming; James Johnstone; Fraser Lyle; Nick McLennan; Joseva Nayacavou; Scott Riddell; Mark Robertson; Scott Wight(c)	Hugh Blake; Glenn Bryce; Jamie Farndale; Dougie Fife; James Fleming; James Johnstone; Damien Hoyland; Nick McLennan; Joseva Nayacavou; Scott Riddell; Mark Robertson; Scott Wight(c)	Hugh Blake; Glenn Bryce; Jamie Farndale; Dougie Fife; James Fleming; James Johnstone; Damien Hoyland; Nick McLennan; Magnus Bradbury; Scott Riddell; Mark Robertson; Scott Wight(c)
Finished: Cup Quarter-finalists	Finished: Bowl Finalists	Finished: Bowl Winners	Finished: Bowl Winners	Finished: Tournament Winners

Scotland team to the 2014 Commonwealth Games

2014 Commonwealth Games
**Player**	**Position**
**Backs**	
Mark Bennett	Centre
Colin Gregor	Scrum-half/Stand-Off
Lee Jones	Scrum-half/Wing
Stuart Hogg	Wing
James Johnstone	Centre
Scott Wight	Stand-Off
**Forwards**	
Richie Vernon	Prop / Centre
James Eddie	Prop
Sean Lamont	Prop
Colin Shaw	Prop/Centre
Scott Riddell	Prop/Hooker
Roddy Grant	Prop/Hooker

== Honours ==
- Kelso Sevens
  - Champions: 1996
- Selkirk Sevens
  - Champions: 1996

== See also ==
- Edinburgh Sevens
- Scotland national rugby union team
- Scottish Rugby Union
- Flower of Scotland - the de facto Scottish national anthem, sung before all Scottish international matches
