= Katsuyuki Sakai =

Japanese rugby union player

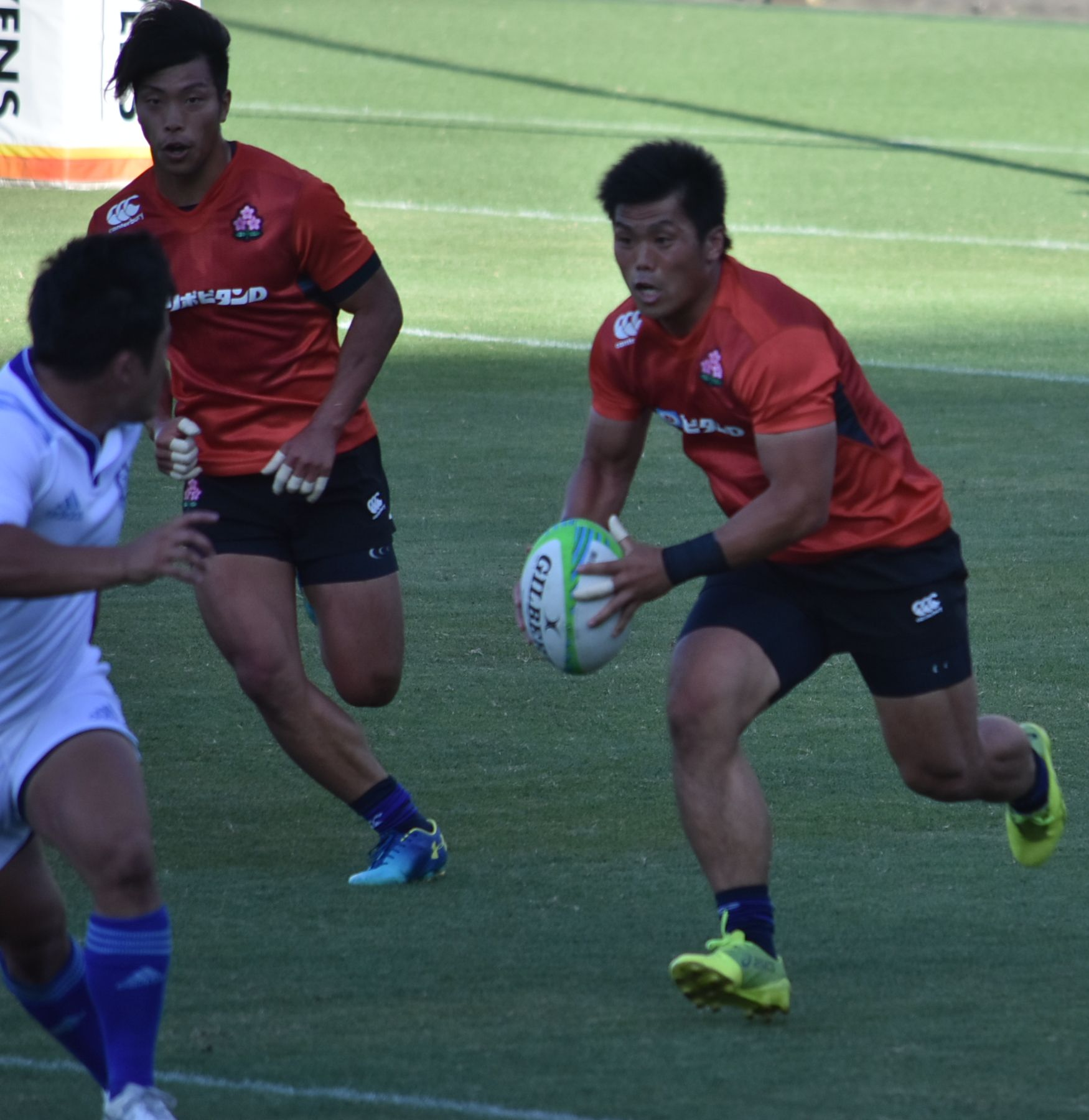
- Born: September 7, 1988 (age 38) Mie, Japan
- Height: 1.72 m (5 ft 7 1/2 in)
- Weight: 85 kg (187 lb; 13 st 5 lb)

Rugby union career
- Position: Wing
Senior career
Years	Team	Apps	(Points)
2013–2022	Toyota Industries	38	(70)
- Correct as of 22 February 2021
International career
Years	Team	Apps	(Points)
2007–2008	Japan U20	5	(0)
National sevens team
Years	Team		Comps
2011–2018	Japan Sevens		42

Katsuyuki Sakai (坂井 克行, Sakai Katsuyuki; born September 7, 1988) is a Japanese rugby union player. He plays for the Japanese club Toyota Industries Shuttles in the Top League. He also plays rugby sevens for Japan's national rugby sevens team and was named in their 2016 Summer Olympics squad.

He captained the Japanese squad when they played at the 2014 Hong Kong Sevens and won the World Series Qualifier for the 2014–15 Sevens World Series. He was also a member of the squad that won the 2015 ARFU Men's Sevens Championships to qualify for the 2016 Summer Olympics.
