= Pablo Fontes =

- Born: Pablo Fontes de Castro; 27 December 1995 (age 30) Madrid, Spain
- Height: 1.75 m (5 ft 9 in)
- Weight: 83 kg (183 lb)

Rugby union career
- Position: Fly-half
Senior career
Years	Team	Apps	(Points)
-2012	CR Majadahonda		
2012-2013	Atlético Madrid Rugby		
2013-2015	Section Paloise		
2015-2016	Alcobendas Rugby		
2016-2020	Avenir Castanéen Rugby		
2020-2021	CR Majadahonda		
International career
Years	Team	Apps	(Points)
2014	Spain	2	
National sevens team
Years	Team		Comps
2014-?	Spain 7s		73

Pablo Fontes (born 27 December 1995) is a Spanish former rugby union and sevens player.

In early 2014, he was called up to Spanish rugby sevens team to play in a tournament in Las Vegas. That same year, on June 14 of 2014, he made his debut with Spain national rugby union team.

He competed for the Spain national rugby sevens team at the 2016 Summer Olympics. He started his career playing in CR Majadahonda and has played in Atlético Madrid Rugby, Alcobendas Rugby, Section Paloise and Avenir Castanéen Rugby. He retired from rugby at CR Majadahonda, his first team.
