= Calum Waters (rugby union) =

English rugby union player

- Born: 31 August 1996 (age 30) Brighton, England
- School: Brighton College
- University: Open University

Rugby union career
- Position: Scrum-half
- Current team: Harlequins
Senior career
| Years | Team | Apps | (Points) |
| 2014-2015 | Worthing Raider | 28 | (67) |
| 2015-2019 | Harlequins | 4 | (5) |
| 2015-2016 | →Esher (loan) | 36 | (40) |
| 2018–2019 | Jersey Reds (loan) | | |
| 2019–2020 | University of Bristol | | |
| 2020– | Hartpury University | | |
- Correct as of 14 May 2017
International career
| Years | Team | Apps | (Points) |
| 2016 | England U20 | 1 | |

Calum Waters (born 31 August 1996) is an English professional rugby union player for the RFU Championship side Hartpury University. He plays Scrum-half.

== Club career ==
Waters played regular first team rugby in the 2014/15 season for Worthing Raiders in National Two South, scoring on 13 occasions, before signing for Harlequins in May 2015.

In August 2016, Waters captained the Harlequins squad at the Singha Sevens.

On 12 March 2017, Waters made his senior debut for the Quins as a replacement and scored a try in the Anglo-Welsh Cup match against Exeter Chiefs. Later that month, the young scrum-half re-signed with Harlequins.

== International career ==
Waters was named as part of the England U20 squad for the 2016 Six Nations Under 20s Championship whereby he played against Wales at the Bristols' Ashton Gate.
