= Joe Jenkins (rugby union) =

English rugby union player (born 2003)

- Born: 13 October 2003 (age 23) Halifax, England
- Height: 191 cm (6 ft 3 in)
- Weight: 103 kg (227 lb)
- School: Monmouth School for Boys

Rugby union career
- Position: Centre
- Current team: Bristol Bears
Senior career
Years	Team	Apps	(Points)
2022-	Bristol Bears	30	(40)
2024	→ Cornish Pirates (loan)	3	(5)
2026–	Leicester Tigers	1	(0)
International career
Years	Team	Apps	(Points)
2021	England U18		
2023	England U20	7	(5)

Joe Jenkins (born 13 October 2003) is a professional rugby union player for Leicester Tigers in Englnd's Premiership Rugby, his preferred position is centre. Born in England, he was raised in Wales and is qualified to represent either internationally.

== Early life ==
Born in Halifax, Jenkins was brought up near Chepstow and attended Monmouth School for Boys, where he served as deputy head boy. He played rugby union at Hereford RFC from under-nine to under-16 level and also represented Newport Schools.

== Club career ==
He signed a professional contract with Bristol Bears in June 2022. In October 2022, he made his professional debut in the Premiership Rugby Cup, scoring a brace of tries on debut against Exeter Chiefs. Jenkins became Bristol's youngest ever starter in the Rugby Premiership when he made his league debut as an 18-year-old against Saracens in November 2022.

He went on to make four Premiership appearances during the 2023-2024 season, and also featured in European competition for the club. He suffered misfortune with injury and played on loan at Rugby Championship side Cornish Pirates in the first half of 2024 for regular minutes.

He returned to Bristol Bears first team squad and received plaudits for his performances at the start of the 2024-25 season, including in an away win against local rivals Bath Rugby.

== International career ==
Although born in England, he is able to represent Wales through his father who is from Llanharan. He was selected to play for England at under-18 and under-20 level. He was selected to play for England U20 at the 2023 World Rugby U20 Championship.

He was also sought after by Wales U20s head coach Byron Hayward who revealed he had tried to select him but Jenkins had only recently been rehabilitated from injury by the English RFU and felt a sense of duty play for England. He was later reported to have said he felt "100% a Welshman".
