= Joe Goodchild =

- Born: Joe Goodchild; 12 April 1998 (age 28) Wales
- Height: 188 cm (6 ft 2 in)
- Weight: 93 kg (14 st 9 lb)
- School: St Alban's RC High School, Pontypool; Coleg Gwent

Rugby union career
- Current team: Cardiff RFC
Senior career
Years	Team	Apps	(Points)
2016-2021	Dragons	20	(15)
- Correct as of 16:15, 12 July 2018 (UTC)

Joe Goodchild (born 12 April 1998) is a Welsh rugby union player who plays for Cardiff RFC as a wing.

Goodchild made his debut for the Dragons in 2016 having previously played for the Dragons academy, Cross Keys RFC and Garndiffaith RFC.
