= Bush Mwale =

Kenyan rugby sevens player

- Born: November 7, 1993 (age 33) Nyeri, Kenya
- Height: 1.85 m (6 ft 1 in)
- Weight: 92 kg (203 lb; 14 st 7 lb)

Rugby union career
National sevens team
| Years | Team | Comps |
- Kenya

Bush Mwale (born November 7, 1993) is a Kenyan rugby sevens player. He competed for Kenya 7s at the 2016 Summer Olympics. He was named in the squad for the Wellington and Las Vegas Sevens of the 2014–15 Sevens World Series.

Mwale missed out on selection for the 2016 Las Vegas and Vancouver sevens tournaments because of a knee injury.
