= Kazushi Hano =

Japanese rugby union player

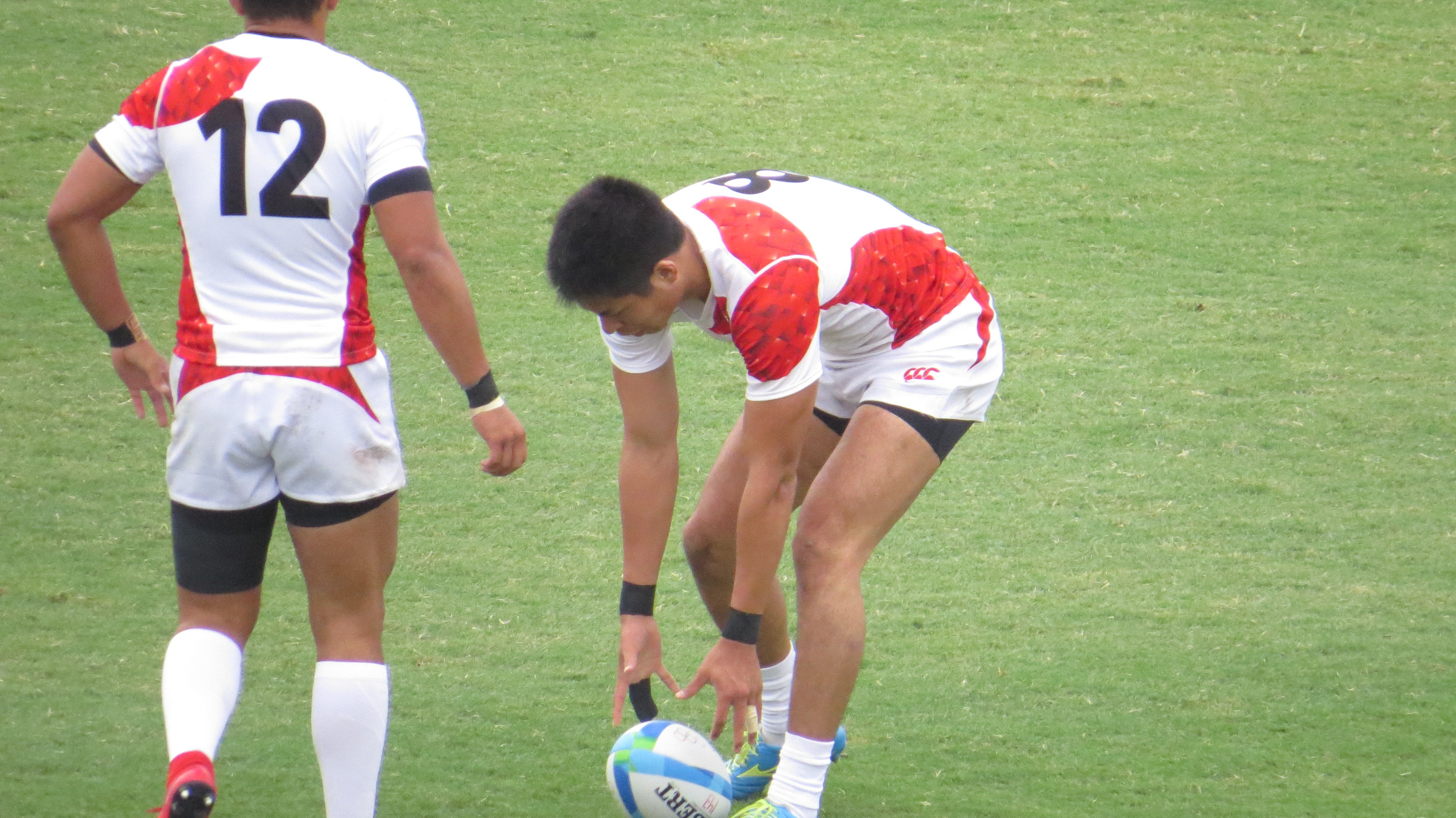
- Born: 21 June 1991 (age 35) Nagoya, Aichi, Japan
- Height: 1.85 m (6 ft 1 in)
- Weight: 87 kg (192 lb; 13 st 10 lb)

Rugby union career
Senior career
Years	Team	Apps	(Points)
2014–2023	NTT Communications Shining Arcs	35	(30)
- Correct as of 21 February 2021
International career
Years	Team	Apps	(Points)
2011	Japan U20	4	(10)
National sevens team
Years	Team		Comps
2012–2021	Japan Sevens		21

Kazushi Hano (羽野 一志, Hano Kazushi; born June 21, 1991) is a Japanese rugby sevens player. He competed for Japan 7s at the 2016 Summer Olympics. He was in Japan 7s's team for the 2014 Asian Games in Incheon, South Korea; he scored one of two tries to help Japan win gold.
