= Jamie Farndale =

Scottish rugby union player

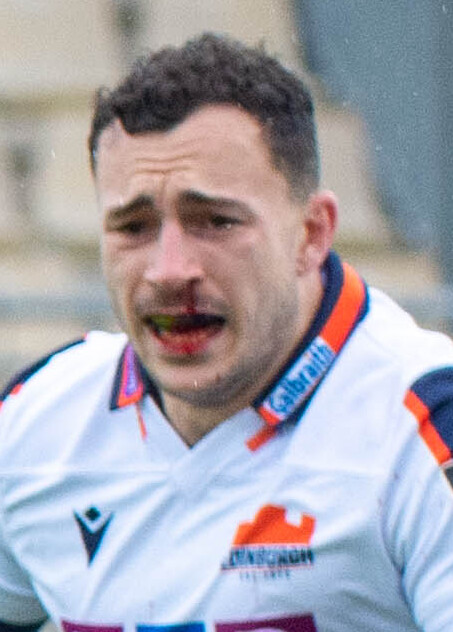
- Farndale in 2021
- Born: James Martin Richard Farndale; 21 February 1994 (age 32) Winchester, Hampshire, England
- Height: 1.84 m (6 ft 0 in)
- Weight: 99 kg (15 st 8 lb)
- School: Edinburgh Academy

Rugby union career
- Position: Wing
- Current team: Edinburgh
Senior career
Years	Team	Apps	(Points)
2012–2021	Edinburgh Rugby	15	(20)
- Correct as of 20 May 2022
International career
Years	Team	Apps	(Points)
2011	Scotland U18	9	(40)
2012–2014	Scotland U20	24	(70)
- Correct as of 20 May 2022
National sevens teams
Years	Team		Comps
2015–	Scotland 7s		51
2021	Great Britain 7s		8
Medal record
Men's rugby sevens
Representing Great Britain
European Games
Silver medal – second place	2023 Kraków–Małopolska	Team competition

Jamie Farndale (born 21 February 1994) is a Scottish rugby union player who plays for the Scotland national rugby sevens team in the World Rugby Sevens Series.

Farndale has previously played for United Rugby Championship side Edinburgh Rugby.

== Early life and education ==
Farndale left school in 2011, where he lifted the Brewin Dolphin Scottish Schools' Cup for Edinburgh Academy at under-15 level in 2008 and the following year, for the Academy's under-18 side. He was part of the U18 runners up side in 2010.

== Rugby career ==
From leaving school, Farndale signed as an EDP with Edinburgh Rugby, where he became and is still the youngest ever debutant for the club. He became a mainstay of the international under-20 side from an early age, featuring in no fewer than three IRB Junior World Championships (2012, 2013 and 2014). He finished his final tournament as joint, all-time top try-scorer (10). He also captained the youth commonwealth games sevens team in 2011 who finished 4th.

In the 2011–12 season, he capped an impressive season by finishing as top try scorer in the 2012 JWC in South Africa.

A leg break in October marred his attempts to add to his first senior competitive appearance in the last match of the 2011–12 season against Cardiff, however, he returned in time for the 2013 World Championships in France, before going on to join the all-time leader board in 2014.

From 2015, Farndale joined the Scotland national sevens team and played in every tournament for the next two seasons, being awarded player of the season and making selection for the wider Olympic training squad at the end of the first.

Farndale went on to win 59 World series appearances and is currently the second-highest try scorer of all time on 137 tries. He co-captained Scotland in 2018/19 with Robbie Fergusson before taking over the captaincy in 2019 until the Scottish program moved to a Great Britain setup. Farndale won Twickenham 7s in 2016 and 2017, scoring the winning try in the quarter-final victory over New Zealand to become the first and still only Scottish side in history to beat a Kiwi side at any level. Farndale was a World Series runner-up in 2021 with Great Britain, scored the World Rugby Sevens Series try of the season in 2022 and was European Games silver medalist in 2023. Farndale also became a Cambridge Blue in 2024, with a record margin of victory in the varsity match.

Farndale captained Scotland at the 2022 Rugby World Cup Sevens in Cape Town. and the 2022 Birmingham Commonwealth Games. He also competed World Cup in San Francisco and the Gold Coast Commonwealth Games both in 2018.

== Environmental advocacy ==
Farndale has used his voice away from the pitch to raise awareness of environmental issues. In 2021 Farndale, along with Alena Olsen of USA Rugby and David Pocock of Australia Rugby, co-wrote an open letter to World Rugby demanding environmental action with over 200 professional players signing the letter. Farndale spoke at Global Sporks Week in 2022 urging sports leaders of their environmental responsibility, and at Sports Positive in the same year on athlete advocacy in the climate space. Farndale won an athlete advocacy award at the International Olympic Committee Sustainability Awards and was selected in Mastercard's 'Future XV' of pioneers shaping the future of rugby.
