= Ian Fitzpatrick (rugby union) =

Irish rugby union player

- Born: 25 August 1994 (age 32) Ratoath, County Meath, Ireland
- Height: 5 ft 11 in (180 cm)
- Weight: 196 lb (89 kg)
- Occupation: Professional rugby player

Rugby union career
- Position: Forward (7s)
Amateur team(s)
Years	Team	Apps	(Points)
2015–	Lansdowne		
Senior career
Years	Team	Apps	(Points)
- Leinster academy
National sevens team
Years	Team		Comps
2017–	Ireland 7s		

Ian Fitzpatrick is an Irish rugby union player. In rugby sevens, he plays as a forward for the Ireland national rugby sevens team. Fitzpatrick began playing rugby sevens in 2015 while with Lansdowne. He was a member of the Irish sevens team that finished second in the 2017 Sevens Grand Prix Series, qualifying for the 2018 Hong Kong Sevens and the 2018 Rugby World Cup Sevens. Fitzpatrick played for Ireland at the 2018 Hong Kong Sevens qualifier, where Ireland fell to Japan 12–7 in the semifinals and failed in their quest to qualify for the 2018–19 World Series.

In rugby fifteens, Fitzpatrick plays as a fullback with Leinster Rugby on their academy team. In his youth, he was a member of the Leinster under 20 team. He was a member of the Ireland squad that played in the 2014 IRB Junior World Championship. Fitzpatrick suffered a setback in summer 2016 when he injured his knee and had to undergo surgery.
