= Earlston High School =

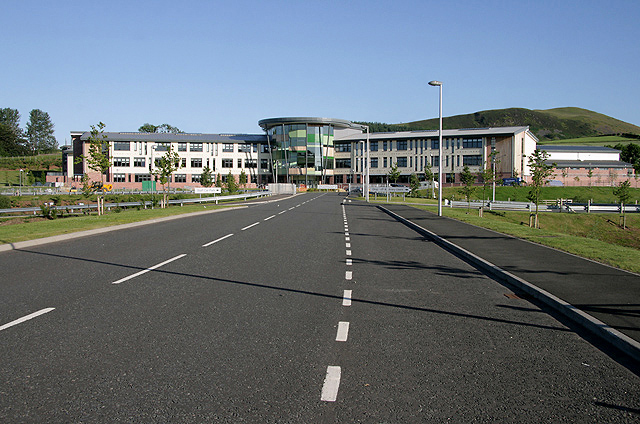
- Earlston High School

Location
- Earlston, Scottish Borders; Scotland; 55.6391°N 2.6616°W

Information
- Type: Secondary School
- Established: 1877
- Head teacher: Alex Johnson
- Years offered: S1-S6
- Enrollment: 1100
- Website: https://www.earlstonhighschool.org.uk
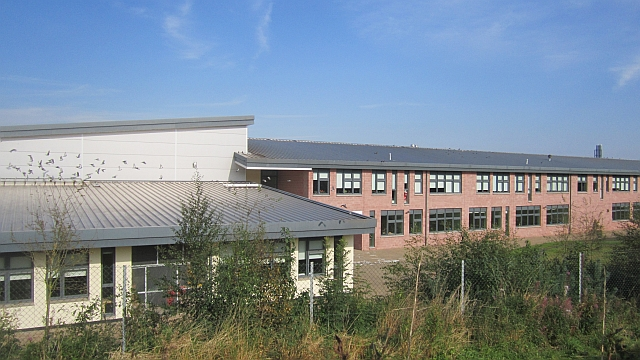

Earlston High School is a secondary school in Earlston, Scottish Borders. It serves Earlston and the surrounding area. Since 2009, the school has been located on the east edge of Earlston, south of the A6105 road.

== Catchment area ==
Earlston High School accepts all pupils within a certain geographical area. Pupils from the schools below are offered free bus travel to and from the school (provided by Scottish Borders Council):

- Channelkirk Primary School
- Gordon Primary School
- Earlston Primary School
- Lauder Primary School
- Melrose Primary School
- Newtown Primary School
- St Boswells Primary School
- Westruther Primary School

Pupils from these areas, where there are other high schools, can be accepted but must pay for transport to the school:

- Galashiels
- Tweedbank
- Kelso
- Jedburgh
- Stow

== New school ==
A new Earlston High School was built along with two other schools in the region, moving the school from the village's High Street to the outskirts. This was to cope with the rising pupil body and the limited space available in the old building. The new location also allowed space for a range of new sports facilities, including dedicated a dedicated rugby field and multi-use games area. A dedicated hockey field was also built in the floodplain just to the north of the school. The new school building was designed by architects 3D Reid and built by Graham Construction, opening its doors to pupils in August 2009.

== Primary school ==
Earlston Primary School has strong links to Earlston High School, and adjoined the old main high school building.
