= Mick McGrath (rugby union) =

Irish rugby union player

- Born: Michael McGrath; 5 January 1991 (age 35) Dublin, Ireland
- Height: 1.83 m (6 ft 0 in)
- Weight: 102 kg (16 st 1 lb)
- School: Catholic University School
- University: Maynooth University

Rugby union career
- Position: Wing
- Current team: Wanderers FC
Amateur team(s)
Years	Team	Apps	(Points)
2014–	Wanderers FC		
Senior career
Years	Team	Apps	(Points)
2014	Plymouth Albion		
2014–2016	Leinster	7	(10)
- Correct as of 22 January 2016
International career
Years	Team	Apps	(Points)
2016–2019	Ireland 7s	32	(65)
- Correct as of 17 January 2022

Michael McGrath (born 5 January 1991) is an Irish rugby union player for Wanderers FC where he plays as a wing. He also plays for the Ireland national rugby sevens team as a forward.

McGrath was educated at Catholic University School (CUS) in Dublin, a school better known for cricket rather than rugby. After a short stint with Plymouth Albion R.F.C. he secured a place in a wider Leinster Rugby training squad whilst playing club rugby with Clontarf, eventually securing a full contract. He made his senior debut in September 2014 against Scarlets. He was called up to the Leinster senior squad for the season commencing 2014–15 following impressive performances in the All-Ireland League. However, he was released from Leinster.

McGrath was the All-Ireland League Division 1A top try scorer in 2014, 2015, and again in 2016. McGrath was part of the Leicester Tigers wider training squad during the summer of 2016, but returned to Clontarf for the 2016-17 season. McGrath was noted for his outstanding performance in a losing effort in the 2017 All-Ireland League final.

== National team ==
McGrath has been involved with the Ireland national rugby sevens team. He was a member of the 2016 squad that attempted unsuccessfully to qualify for the 2016 Rio Olympics. He was a member of the Ireland sevens squad that finished second in the 2017 Sevens Grand Prix Series, qualifying for the 2018 Hong Kong Sevens and the 2018 Rugby World Cup Sevens. McGrath was not, however, named as one of the core squad players for the 2018 season.
