= Rugby sevens at the 2020 Summer Olympics – Men's team squads =

For all participating teams for the men's rugby sevens competition at the 2020 Summer Olympics, each squad could have up to 12 players, however in July 2021, the International Olympic Committee allowed reserves to also compete due to the COVID-19 pandemic. This meant each team could have up to 12 players plus one alternate.

== Group A ==
=== Argentina ===
Argentina's 12-man squad plus one alternate was named on 6 July 2021.

Head coach: Santiago Gómez Cora

No.	Pos.	Player	Date of birth (age)	Events	Points
1	FW	Rodrigo Isgro	24 March 1999 (aged 22)	4	25
2	FW	Lucio Cinti	23 February 2000 (aged 21)	6	30
3	FW	Germán Schulz	5 February 1994 (aged 27)	43	330
4	BK	Ignacio Mendy	29 June 2000 (aged 21)	1	20
5	BK	Rodrigo Etchart	24 January 1994 (aged 27)	34	307
6	FW	Santiago Álvarez (c)	17 February 1994 (aged 27)	44	189
7	BK	Lautaro Bazán	24 February 1996 (aged 25)	31	383
8	BK	Gastón Revol	26 November 1986 (aged 34)	81	941
9	FW	Matías Osadczuk	22 April 1997 (aged 24)	24	315
11	BK	Luciano González	10 April 1997 (aged 24)	29	295
10	BK	Santiago Mare	21 October 1996 (aged 24)	27	308
12	BK	Marcos Moneta	2 March 2000 (aged 21)	4	75
13	BK	Felipe del Mestre	25 September 1993 (aged 27)	19	114

=== Australia ===
Australia's 12-man squad plus one alternate was named on 6 July 2021. Nathan Lawson replaced Henry Paterson due to injury on 18 July 2021.

Head coach: Tim Walsh

No.	Pos.	Player	Date of birth (age)	Events	Points
1	BK	Henry Hutchison	12 February 1997 (aged 24)	32	435
2	BK	Samu Kerevi	27 September 1993 (aged 27)	0	0
3	FW	Nathan Lawson	23 January 1999 (aged 22)	0	0
4	BK	Dietrich Roache	6 July 2001 (aged 20)	0	0
5	BK	Lachie Miller	14 August 1994 (aged 26)	12	85
6	FW	Joe Pincus	24 July 1996 (aged 25)	12	100
7	BK	Josh Turner	23 September 1995 (aged 25)	6	70
8	FW	Dylan Pietsch	23 April 1998 (aged 23)	18	115
9	BK	Josh Coward	8 June 1997 (aged 24)	7	114
10	FW	Nick Malouf (c)	19 March 1993 (aged 28)	40	275
11	BK	Maurice Longbottom	30 January 1995 (aged 26)	20	333
12	FW	Lachie Anderson	27 August 1997 (aged 23)	27	320
13	BK	Lewis Holland	14 January 1993 (aged 28)	53	864

=== New Zealand ===
New Zealand's 12-man squad plus one alternate was named on 6 July 2021. Amanaki Nicole replaced Sam Dickson due to injury on 23 July 2021.

Head coach: Clark Laidlaw

No.	Pos.	Player	Date of birth (age)	Events	Points
1	FW	Scott Curry (c)	17 May 1988 (aged 33)	54	620
2	FW	Tim Mikkelson (c)	13 August 1986 (aged 34)	91	1,195
3	FW	Tone Ng Shiu	26 May 1994 (aged 27)	27	160
4	BK	Etene Nanai-Seturo	20 August 1999 (aged 21)	11	70
5	FW	Dylan Collier	27 April 1991 (aged 30)	38	255
6	BK	Ngarohi McGarvey-Black	20 May 1996 (aged 25)	12	152
7	FW	Amanaki Nicole	8 February 1992 (aged 29)	50	490
8	BK	Andrew Knewstubb	14 September 1995 (aged 25)	25	527
9	BK	Regan Ware	7 August 1994 (aged 26)	36	490
10	BK	Kurt Baker	7 October 1988 (aged 32)	43	796
11	BK	Joe Webber	27 August 1993 (aged 27)	38	480
12	BK	Sione Molia	5 September 1993 (aged 27)	37	330
13	BK	William Warbrick	6 March 1998 (aged 23)	3	5

=== South Korea ===
South Korea's 12-man squad plus one alternate was named on 6 July 2021.

Head coach: Seo Chun-oh

No.	Pos.	Player	Date of birth (age)	Events	Points
1	FW	Han Kun-kyu (c)	22 January 1987 (aged 34)	4	20
2	FW	Kim Hyun-soo	8 November 1988 (aged 32)	4	25
3	FW	Andre Jin Coquillard	15 January 1991 (aged 30)	2	10
4	BK	Chang Yong-heung	12 November 1993 (aged 27)	0	0
5	BK	Lee Seong-bae	7 April 1990 (aged 31)	3	13
6	BK	Kim Nam-uk	5 February 1990 (aged 31)	2	0
7	BK	Jang Jeong-min	10 November 1994 (aged 26)	2	27
8	FW	Jang Seong-min	22 August 1992 (aged 28)	2	5
9	BK	Park Wan-yong (c)	2 June 1984 (aged 37)	5	25
10	FW	Lee Jin-kyu	4 July 1994 (aged 27)	1	0
11	FW	Choi Seong-deok	31 May 1999 (aged 22)	0	0
12	BK	Jeong Yeon-sik	8 May 1993 (aged 28)	1	0
13	BK	Kim Gwong-min	2 April 1988 (aged 33)	0	0

== Group B ==
=== Canada ===
Canada's 12-man squad plus one alternate was named on 25 June 2021.

Head coach: Henry Paul

No.	Pos.	Player	Date of birth (age)	Events	Points
1	FW	Matthew Mullins	28 July 1994 (aged 27)	35	145
2	BK	Theo Sauder	2 April 1996 (aged 25)	6	50
3	FW	Mike Fuailefau	20 March 1992 (aged 29)	58	325
4	FW	Phil Berna	7 April 1996 (aged 25)	26	115
5	FW	Conor Trainor	5 December 1989 (aged 31)	42	287
6	BK	Connor Braid	31 January 1990 (aged 31)	33	293
7	BK	Lucas Hammond	14 November 1993 (aged 27)	45	130
8	BK	Justin Douglas	5 April 1994 (aged 27)	53	725
9	BK	Nathan Hirayama (c)	23 March 1988 (aged 33)	79	1,859
10	BK	Patrick Kay	19 September 1993 (aged 27)	50	299
11	FW	Harry Jones (c)	26 August 1989 (aged 31)	71	782
12	FW	Jake Thiel	2 June 1997 (aged 24)	17	50
13	BK	Andrew Coe	8 April 1996 (aged 25)	13	55

=== Fiji ===
Fiji's 12-man squad plus one alternate was named on 6 July 2021.

Head coach: Gareth Baber

No.	Pos.	Player	Date of birth (age)	Events	Points
1	FW	Josua Vakurunabili	10 June 1992 (aged 29)	25	235
2	FW	Iosefo Masi	9 May 1998 (aged 23)	0	0
3	FW	Kalione Nasoko	2 December 1990 (aged 30)	26	319
4	FW	Jiuta Wainiqolo	10 March 1999 (aged 22)	0	0
5	FW	Asaeli Tuivuaka	22 December 1995 (aged 25)	8	55
6	FW	Meli Derenalagi	26 November 1998 (aged 22)	16	110
7	BK	Vilimoni Botitu	15 June 1998 (aged 23)	16	265
8	BK	Waisea Nacuqu	24 May 1993 (aged 28)	34	661
9	BK	Jerry Tuwai (c)	23 March 1989 (aged 32)	54	674
10	BK	Semi Radradra	13 June 1992 (aged 29)	4	49
11	BK	Aminiasi Tuimaba	26 March 1995 (aged 26)	15	332
12	BK	Napolioni Bolaca	20 October 1996 (aged 24)	8	205
13	BK	Sireli Maqala	20 March 2000 (aged 21)	0	0

=== Great Britain ===
Great Britain's 12-man squad plus one alternate was named on 6 July 2021.

Head coach: Simon Amor

No.	Pos.	Player	Country	Date of birth (age)	Events	Points
1	BK	Max McFarland	Scotland	13 July 1993 (aged 28)	26	360
2	FW	Ben Harris	England	8 September 1999 (aged 21)	9	70
3	FW	Alex Davis	England	3 October 1992 (aged 28)	24	172
4	BK	Dan Norton	England	22 March 1988 (aged 33)	90	1,784
5	FW	Ross McCann	Scotland	30 October 1997 (aged 23)	16	44
6	BK	Tom Mitchell (c)	England	22 July 1989 (aged 32)	63	1,593
7	BK	Dan Bibby	England	6 February 1991 (aged 30)	54	704
8	FW	Alec Coombes	Scotland	26 November 1995 (aged 25)	16	85
9	BK	Ollie Lindsay-Hague	England	8 October 1990 (aged 30)	40	385
10	BK	Robbie Fergusson	Scotland	30 August 1993 (aged 27)	25	347
11	FW	Ethan Waddleton	England	23 November 1996 (aged 24)	29	40
12	BK	Harry Glover	England	31 December 1995 (aged 25)	20	95
13	BK	Tom Bowen	England	31 January 1993 (aged 28)	49	465

=== Japan ===
Japan's 12-man squad plus one alternate was named on 6 July 2021.

Head coach: Kensuke Iwabuchi

No.	Pos.	Player	Date of birth (age)	Events	Points
1	FW	Jose Seru	9 February 1991 (aged 30)	3	0
2	FW	Lote Tuqiri	12 November 1987 (aged 33)	26	145
3	FW	Colin Bourke	15 October 1984 (aged 36)	2	27
4	BK	Kazushi Hano	21 June 1991 (aged 30)	16	80
5	FW	Kameli Soejima	1 June 1983 (aged 38)	21	222
6	FW	Masakatsu Hikosaka	18 January 1991 (aged 30)	13	40
7	BK	Brackin Karauria-Henry	31 July 1988 (aged 33)	8	150
8	BK	Chihito Matsui (c)	11 November 1994 (aged 26)	11	35
9	BK	Ryota Kano	10 May 1992 (aged 29)	10	37
10	BK	Yoshikazu Fujita	8 September 1993 (aged 27)	20	150
11	BK	Kippei Ishida	28 April 2000 (aged 21)	5	20
12	BK	Naoki Motomura	11 April 1992 (aged 29)	14	95
13	BK	Kazuhiro Goya	12 April 1993 (aged 28)	15	65

== Group C ==
=== Ireland ===
Ireland's 12-man squad plus one alternate was named on 6 July 2021.

Head coach: Anthony Eddy

No.	Pos.	Player	Date of birth (age)	Events	Points
1	FW	Jack Kelly	26 October 1997 (aged 23)	8	60
2	FW	Adam Leavy	21 September 1995 (aged 25)	8	15
3	FW	Harry McNulty	5 March 1993 (aged 28)	10	45
4	FW	Foster Horan	3 November 1992 (aged 28)	4	20
5	FW	Ian Fitzpatrick	25 August 1994 (aged 26)	3	20
6	BK	Billy Dardis (c)	31 May 1990 (aged 31)	10	164
7	BK	Jordan Conroy	10 March 1994 (aged 27)	9	225
8	BK	Greg O'Shea	23 March 1995 (aged 26)	8	25
9	BK	Mark Roche	25 January 1993 (aged 28)	8	81
10	BK	Terry Kennedy	4 July 1996 (aged 25)	9	120
11	BK	Hugo Lennox	6 March 1999 (aged 22)	8	27
12	BK	Gavin Mullin	29 November 1997 (aged 23)	0	0
13	BK	Bryan Mollen	25 September 1995 (aged 25)	8	30

=== Kenya ===
Kenya's 12-man squad plus one alternate was named on 6 July 2021.

Head coach: Innocent Simiyu

No.	Pos.	Player	Date of birth (age)	Events	Points
1	BK	Daniel Taabu	19 January 1996 (aged 25)	15	216
2	FW	Herman Humwa	8 November 1995 (aged 25)	12	10
3	FW	Alvin Otieno	19 April 1994 (aged 27)	10	55
4	FW	Vincent Onyala	10 December 1996 (aged 24)	15	177
5	BK	Billy Odhiambo	26 June 1994 (aged 27)	48	440
6	BK	Jeff Oluoch	2 April 1995 (aged 26)	22	160
7	BK	Eden Agero	17 September 1990 (aged 30)	32	273
8	FW	Andrew Amonde (c)	25 December 1983 (aged 37)	76	320
9	BK	Nelson Oyoo	26 June 1994 (aged 27)	36	230
11	BK	Collins Injera (c)	18 October 1986 (aged 34)	83	1,443
10	BK	Johnstone Olindi	4 November 1999 (aged 21)	13	132
12	FW	Willy Ambaka	14 May 1990 (aged 31)	51	615
13	BK	Jacob Ojee	7 March 1991 (aged 30)	12	65

=== South Africa ===
South Africa's 12-man squad plus one alternate was named on 6 July 2021.

Head coach: Neil Powell

No.	Pos.	Player	Date of birth (age)	Events	Points
1	FW	Chris Dry	13 February 1988 (aged 33)	74	490
2	FW	Sako Makata	10 September 1998 (aged 22)	9	20
3	FW	Impi Visser	30 May 1995 (aged 26)	13	65
4	FW	Zain Davids	4 May 1997 (aged 24)	22	80
5	FW	Angelo Davids	1 June 1999 (aged 22)	6	90
6	FW	JC Pretorius	29 January 1998 (aged 23)	10	120
7	BK	Branco du Preez	8 May 1990 (aged 31)	75	1,355
8	BK	Selvyn Davids	26 March 1994 (aged 27)	20	409
9	BK	Justin Geduld	1 October 1993 (aged 27)	50	1,034
10	BK	Kurt-Lee Arendse	17 June 1996 (aged 25)	8	70
11	BK	Siviwe Soyizwapi (c)	7 December 1992 (aged 28)	30	465
12	BK	Stedman Gans	19 March 1997 (aged 24)	22	170
13	BK	Ronald Brown	2 September 1995 (aged 25)	0	0

=== United States ===
United States' 12-man squad plus one alternate was named on 6 July 2021. Brett Thompson replaced Ben Pinkelman due to injury on 8 July 2021.

Head coach: Mike Friday

No.	Pos.	Player	Date of birth (age)	Events	Points
1	BK	Carlin Isles	21 November 1989 (aged 31)	57	1,037
2	FW	Brett Thompson	17 August 1990 (aged 30)	32	175
3	FW	Danny Barrett	23 March 1990 (aged 31)	54	564
4	FW	Matai Leuta	20 July 1990 (aged 31)	40	135
5	FW	Joe Schroeder	14 June 1993 (aged 28)	12	25
6	BK	Kevon Williams	7 June 1991 (aged 30)	27	192
7	BK	Folau Niua	27 January 1985 (aged 36)	69	647
8	BK	Maceo Brown	1 September 1995 (aged 25)	14	35
9	FW	Stephen Tomasin	25 September 1994 (aged 26)	37	616
10	BK	Madison Hughes (c)	26 October 1992 (aged 28)	52	1,510
11	BK	Perry Baker	29 June 1986 (aged 35)	47	1,027
12	BK	Martin Iosefo	13 January 1990 (aged 31)	46	378
13	BK	Cody Melphy	5 April 1993 (aged 28)	6	53
