= 2020 Sydney Sevens =

2020 rugby tournament

- Sevens World Series XXI
- Host nation: Australia
- Date: 1–2 February 2020

Cup
- Champion: Fiji
- Runner-up: South Africa
- Third: United States

Tournament details
- Matches played: 34
- Tries scored: 202 (average 5.94 per match)
- Most points: Angelo Davids (40); Napolioni Bolaca (40)
- Most tries: Angelo Davids (8)

The 2020 Sydney Sevens was the fourth tournament in the 2019–20 World Rugby Sevens Series and the eighteenth edition of the Australian Sevens. It was held over the weekend of 1–2 February 2019 at Bankwest Stadium. Fiji won the tournament to claim their sixth Australian title, narrowly defeating South Africa in the final by 12–10.

This was second tournament in 2019–20 to have only one team from each pool qualify to the cup knockout phase.

== Format ==
The sixteen teams were drawn into four pools of four teams, with each team playing the others in their pool once. The knockout round qualifications were determined by the final pool standings, with the four teams that topped their pool advancing to the semifinals to compete for berths in the cup final or third place match.

The remaining teams had only one further classification match each, based on their position, table points and differential in the pool standings. The four teams that finished second in their pool were paired into direct playoffs for either 5th place or 7th place. The teams that finished third were paired into the playoffs for 9th or 11th. Teams that were last in their pool were paired into playoffs for 13th place or 15th place.

== Pool stage ==
All times in AEDT (UTC+11:00)

=== Pool A ===
Pos	Team	Pld	W	D	L	PF	PA	PD	Pts	Qualification
1	Fiji	3	3	0	0	109	19	+90	9	Advance to semifinals
2	New Zealand	3	2	0	1	78	36	+42	7	5th-place playoff
3	Wales	3	1	0	2	31	130	–99	5	11th-place playoff
4	Kenya	3	0	0	3	40	73	–33	3	15th-place playoff

1 February 2020
13:09

Kenya	14–28	Fiji
Try: Injera 1'c Olindi 14'c Con: Injera (1/1) 1'; Taabu (1/1) 14'	Report	Try: Tuimaba (2) 3'c, 11'c Botitu 6'c Vakurunabili 7'c Con: Bolaca (2/2) 3', 7'; Nacuqu (2/2) 8', 11'

Bankwest Stadium
Referee: Richard Kelly (New Zealand)

1 February 2020
13:31

New Zealand	54–5	Wales
Try: Mikkelson 1'c Clarke (2) 2'c, 6'c Dickson 4'm Rayasi (2) 5', 9'; Nanai-Seturo 8'c Ware 10'c Con: Koroi (6/7) 1', 3', 5', 6', 8', 9'; McGarvey-Black (1/1) 11'	Report	Try: Goodchild 12'm Con: Thomas (0/1)

Bankwest Stadium
Referee: Damián Schneider (Argentina)

1 February 2020
19:05

Kenya	21–26	Wales
Try: Amonde 1'c Injera 9'c Taabu 12'c Con: Taabu (2/2) 1', 9'; Olindi (1/1) 12'	Report	Try: Thomas 4'm Roach 7'c Jones 13'c Treharne 14'c Con: Treharne (2/3) 7', 14'; Benjamin (1/1) 14'

Bankwest Stadium
Referee: Francisco González (Uruguay)

1 February 2020
19:33

New Zealand	5–26	Fiji
Try: Ware 9'm Con: Koroi (0/1)	Report	Try: Tuimaba (2) 0'c, 5'c Mocenacagi 3'c Nacuqu 12'm Con: Bolaca (3/3) 1', 4', 5'; Nacuqu (0/1)

Bankwest Stadium
Referee: Damon Murphy (Australia)

2 February 2020
12:19

Fiji	55–0	Wales
Try: Nacuqu 0'c Tuimaba (2) 2'c, 3'm Derenalagi 6'c Tuwai 7'm Bolaca 7'c Ratuvoka 11'm Naduva 13'c Ikanikoda 14'm Con: Bolaca (3/5) 0', 2', 6'; Ikanikoda (2/3) 7', 13'; Botitu (0/1)	Report

Bankwest Stadium
Referee: Jérémy Rozier (France)

2 February 2020
12:41

New Zealand	19–5	Kenya
Try: Rayasi 1'c Mikkelson 3'm Dickson 11'c Con: Curry (1/1) 2'; McGarvey-Black (1/2) 11'	Report	Try: Mwale 7'm Con: Taabu (0/1)

Bankwest Stadium
Referee: Jordan Way (Australia)

=== Pool B ===
Pos	Team	Pld	W	D	L	PF	PA	PD	Pts	Qualification
1	South Africa	3	3	0	0	112	26	+86	9	Advance to semifinals
2	Argentina	3	2	0	1	59	78	–19	7	7th-place playoff
3	France	3	1	0	2	41	58	–17	5	9th-place playoff
4	Samoa	3	0	0	3	38	88	–50	3	15th-place playoff

1 February 2020
11:41

Argentina	14–52	South Africa
Try: Osadczuk 10'c del Mestre 14'c Con: Ulloa (2/2) 11', 14'	Report	Try: Pretorius 1'c S. Davids (2) 3'c, 9'c A. Davids (3) 5'm, 12'c, 13'c Geduld 7'c Z. Davids 7'm Con: Geduld (2/2) 1', 9'; S. Davids (2/4) 3', 7' du Preez (2/2) 12', 14'

Bankwest Stadium
Referee: James Doleman (New Zealand)

1 February 2020
12:03

France	24–17	Samoa
Try: Siega 0'm Riva 2'c Veredamu 7'm Zeghdar 14'c Con: Riva (2/4) 2', 14'	Report	Try: Leilua 5'c Vaili 8'm Tuitama 12'; Con: Leilua (1/1) 6'; Alosio (0/1)

Bankwest Stadium
Referee: Jordan Way (Australia)

1 February 2020
17:08

Argentina	28–21	Samoa
Try: Gonzalez 0'c Schulz 4'c Mare (2) 12'c, 13'c Con: Mare (3/3) 0', 4', 14' del Mestre (1/1) 12'	Report	Try: Vaili 2'c Perez 6'c Scanlan 10'c Con: Vaili (1/1) 2'; Perez (1/1) 6'; Alosio (1/1) 10'

Bankwest Stadium
Referee: Jérémy Rozier (France)

1 February 2020
17:30

France	12–24	South Africa
Try: Valleau (2) 3'c, 8'm Con: Barraque (1/2) 3'	Report	Try: A. Davids (3) 0'c, 7'm, 11'm Pretorius 4'c Con: S. Davids (2/4) 1', 5'

Bankwest Stadium
Referee: Richard Kelly (New Zealand)

2 February 2020
10:51

South Africa	36–0	Samoa
Try: Pretorius (2) 1'm, 8'm S. Davids 4'c A. Davids (2) 5'c, 10'c du Plessis 14'm Con: S. Davids (2/4) 4', 6' du Preez (1/2) 10'	Report

Bankwest Stadium
Referee: Craig Evans (Wales)

2 February 2020
11:13

France	5−17	Argentina
Try: Siega 2'm Con: Riva (0/1)	Report	Try: Mare 0'm Gonzalez 5'c Etchart 9'm Con: Mare (1/3) 6'

Bankwest Stadium
Referee: Damon Murphy (Australia)

=== Pool C ===
Pos	Team	Pld	W	D	L	PF	PA	PD	Pts	Qualification
1	United States	3	3	0	0	120	28	+92	9	Advance to semifinals
2	Australia	3	2	0	1	71	64	+7	7	5th-place playoff
3	Scotland	3	0	1	2	49	85	–35	4	11th-place playoff
4	Japan	3	0	1	2	35	99	–64	4	13th-place playoff

1 February 2020
10:57

United States	32–14	Scotland
Try: Pinkelman (2) 1'm, 7'm Tomasin (2) 3'm, 13'm Melphy 8'm Unufe 9'c Con: Tomasin (1/6) 10'	Report	Try: McFarland 5'c Godsmark 14'c Con: Fergusson (1/1) 6'; Lowe (1/1) 14'

Bankwest Stadium
Referee: Craig Evans (Wales)

1 February 2020
11:19

Australia	33–7	Japan
Try: Anderson 1'c Skelton 6'c Turner 8'm Pietsch 10'c Miller 13'c Con: Holland (2/3) 1', 6'; Longbottom (2/2) 11', 13'	Report	Try: Oishi 14'c Con: Hashino (1/1) 14'

Bankwest Stadium
Referee: Francisco González (Uruguay)

1 February 2020
16:24

United States	45–7	Japan
Try: Baker (2) 0'c, 4'c Melphy 7'c Fuala'au 7'c Isles (3) 10'c, 11'm, 13'm Con: Tomasin (3/3) 1', 4', 7'; Melphy (2/4) 7', 10'	Report	Try: Hayashi 2'c Con: Hashino (1/1) 3'

Bankwest Stadium
Referee: Damián Schneider (Argentina)

1 February 2020
16:46

Australia	31–14	Scotland
Try: Hutchison 2'c Turner 5'c Longbottom (2) 10'c, 13'm Anderson 14'; Con: Holland (3/4) 3', 6', 11'	Report	Try: Fergusson 4'c Penalty try 9'; Con: Lowe (1/1) 4'

Bankwest Stadium
Referee: James Doleman (New Zealand)

2 February 2020
10:07

Scotland	21–21	Japan
Try: Elms 4'c McFarland 6'c Fife 13'c Con: Fergusson (2/2) 5', 6'; Lowe (1/1) 13'	Report	Try: Kano 1'c Yamauchi 3'c Noguchi 7'c Con: Kano (3/3) 2', 3', 7'

Bankwest Stadium
Referee: Francisco González (Uruguay

2 February 2020
10:29

Australia	7–43	United States
Try: Holland 3'c Con: Holland (1/1) 3'	Report	Try: Melphy 0'c Baker (3) 1'c, 5'c, 9'm Isles (2) 8'm, 10'c Leuta 12'm Con: Melphy (4/5) 0', 2', 6', 11'; Tomasin (0/2)

Bankwest Stadium
Referee: Richard Kelly (New Zealand)

=== Pool D ===
Pos	Team	Pld	W	D	L	PF	PA	PD	Pts	Qualification
1	England	3	3	0	0	92	26	+66	9	Advance to semifinals
2	Ireland	3	1	0	2	57	57	0	5	7th-place playoff
3	Canada	3	1	0	2	54	73	–19	5	9th-place playoff
4	Spain	3	1	0	2	38	85	–47	5	13th-place playoff

1 February 2020
12:25

Canada	28–19	Ireland
Try: Coe 4'c Hirayama 7'c Richard 10'c Jones 12'c Con: Hirayama (4/4) 5', 7', 10', 12'	Report	Try: McNulty 3'm Conroy 6'c O'Donnell 8'c Con: Dardis (2/3) 6', 8'

Bankwest Stadium
Referee: Damon Murphy (Australia)

1 February 2020
12:47

England	47–0	Spain
Try: Edwards 2'c Harris (2) 5'c, 6'm Bowen 7'c Kerr 9'c Norton 10'c Lindsay-Hague 12'c Con: Edwards (1/1) 2'; Bibby (3/4) 5', 7', 9'; Mitchell (2/2) 11', 13'	Report

Bankwest Stadium
Referee: Jérémy Rozier (France)

1 February 2020
18:05

Canada	12–28	Spain
Try: Coe 4'm Richard 10'c Con: Hirayama (1/2) 11'	Report	Try: Losada (2) 0'c, 6'c Pla 7'c M. Sainz-Trapaga 12'c Con: Hernández (3/3) 1', 6', 7', 13'

Bankwest Stadium
Referee: Craig Evans (Wales)

1 February 2020
18:35

England	19–12	Ireland
Try: Harris 7'c Norton (2) 7'm, 8'c Con: Mitchell (1/2) 7'; Bibby (1/1) 9'	Report	Try: Dardis 5'c Kennedy 14'm Con: Dardis (1/1) 6'; Lennox (0/1)

Bankwest Stadium
Referee: Jordan Way (Australia)

2 February 2020
11:35

Ireland	26–10	Spain
Try: Kennedy (2) 1'm, 5'c Kelly 4'c Penalty try 8'; Con: Dardis (2/3) 4', 6'	Report	Try: M. Sainz-Trapaga 7'm de la Rosa 12'm Con: Hernández (0/2)

Bankwest Stadium
Referee: Damián Schneider (Argentina)

2 February 2020
11:57

England	26–14	Canada
Try: Ellery 3'c Kerr 6'm Harris 11'c Lindsay-Hague 12'c Con: Bibby (1/1) 3'; Mitchell (2/3) 11', 12'	Report	Try: Braid 1'c Coe 9'c Con: Hirayama (2/2) 2', 9'

Bankwest Stadium
Referee: James Doleman (New Zealand)

== Placement matches ==
=== Fifteenth place ===
2 February 2020
16:10

Kenya	12–19	Samoa
Try: Ambaka 5'c Onyala 11'm Con: Olindi (1/1) 6'; Taabu (0/1)	Report	Try: Solia 0'm Alofipo 9'c Scanlan 12'c Con: Scanlan 10'; Alosio (1/2) 13'

Bankwest Stadium
Referee: Damián Schneider (Argentina)

=== Thirteenth place ===
2 February 2020
16:32

Spain	14–7	Japan
Try: Rodriguez-Guerra 3'c Fontes 7'c Con: Hernández (2/2) 3', 7'	Report	Try: Tsuoka 11'c Con: Kano (1/1) 11'

Bankwest Stadium
Referee: Francisco González (Uruguay)

=== Eleventh place ===
2 February 2020
16:54

Wales	5–21	Scotland
Try: Goodchild 12'm Con: Treharne (0/1)	Report	Try: Pecqueur 6'c Fergusson 7'c Miller 9'c Con: Fergusson (1/1) 7'; Lowe (2/2) 8', 9'

Bankwest Stadium
Referee: James Doleman (New Zealand)

=== Ninth place ===
2 February 2020
17:16

France	7−0	Canada
Try: Valleau 1'c Con: Riva (1/1) 2'	Report

Bankwest Stadium
Referee: Richard Kelly (New Zealand)

=== Seventh place ===
2 February 2020
17:38

Argentina	12−21	Ireland
Try: Etchart 0'm Isgro 3'c Con: Mare (1/2) 3'	Report	Try: Kennedy 7'c O'Shea 9'c Conroy 14'c Con: Dardis (3/3) 8', 10', 14'

Bankwest Stadium
Referee: Jérémy Rozier (France)

=== Fifth place ===
2 February 2020
18:00

New Zealand	24−5	Australia
Try: Molia 0'c Ware 4'm Collier 9'c Clarke 11'm Con: McGarvey-Black (2/4) 0', 9'	Report	Try: Anderson 14'c Con: Holland (1/1) 14'

Bankwest Stadium
Referee: Craig Evans (Wales)

== Cup ==
Semi-finals
2 February – 16:20 – Bankwest Stadium
South Africa	19
United States	12
2 February – 16:42 – Bankwest Stadium
Fiji	17
England	14

Final
2 February – 20:56 – Bankwest Stadium
South Africa	10
Fiji	12
Third place
2 February – 19:29 – Bankwest Stadium
United States	17
England	10

Matches

Semi-finals

2 February 2020
16:20

South Africa	19–12	United States
Try: Pretorius 0'm S. Davids 5'c Gans 10'c Con: S. Davids (2/3) 6', 10'	Report	Try: Iosefo 2'm Pinkelman 4'c Con: Melphy (1/2) 4'

Western Sydney Stadium
Referee: Damon Murphy (Australia)

2 February 2020
16:42

Fiji	17–14	England
Try: Bolaca 2'c Nacuqu 7'm Tuwai 9;m Con: Bolaca (1/1) 2'; Nacuqu (0/2)	Report	Try: Penalty try 11'; Mitchell 13'c Con: Mitchell (1/1) 13'

Western Sydney Stadium
Referee: Jordan Way (Australia)

3rd place

2 February 2020
18:59

United States	17–10	England
Try: Baker 0'c Con: Tomasin (1/2) 1'; Melphy (0/1)	Report	Try: Hendy 7'm Lindsay-Hague 14'm Con: Mitchell (0/1); Edwards (0/1)

Western Sydney Stadium
Referee: Jérémy Rozier (France)

Cup Final

2 February 2020
19:56

South Africa	10–12	Fiji
Try: Bolaca (2) 1'c, 6'm Con: Bolaca (1/1) 1'; Botitu (0/1)	Report	Try: Pretorius 3'm Z. Davids 10'm Con: S. Davids (0/2)

Western Sydney Stadium
Referee: James Doleman (New Zealand)

== Tournament placings ==
Place	Team	Points
1st place, gold medalist(s)	Fiji	22
2nd place, silver medalist(s)	South Africa	19
3rd place, bronze medalist(s)	United States	17
4	England	15
5	New Zealand	13
6	Australia	12
7	Ireland	11
8	Argentina	10

Place	Team	Points
9	France	8
10	Canada	7
11	Scotland	6
12	Wales	5
13	Spain	4
14	Japan	3
15	Samoa	2
16	Kenya	1

== See also ==
- 2020 Sydney Women's Sevens
- World Rugby Sevens Series
- 2019–20 World Rugby Sevens Series

World Sevens Series XIX
Preceded by 2020 New Zealand Sevens	2020 Sydney Sevens	Succeeded by 2020 USA Sevens
Australian Sevens
Preceded by 2019 Sydney Sevens	2020 Sydney Sevens	Succeeded by 2021 Sydney Sevens
