= 2019 New Zealand Sevens =

- Sevens World Series XX
- Host nation: New Zealand
- Date: 26–27 January 2019

Cup
- Champion: Fiji
- Runner-up: United States
- Third: New Zealand

Challenge Trophy
- Winner: England

Tournament details
- Matches played: 45
- Tries scored: 272 (average 6.04 per match)
- Most points: Waisea Nacuqu (47)
- Most tries: Aminiasi Tuimaba (8); Robbie Fergusson (8)

The 2019 New Zealand Sevens was the third tournament within the 2018–19 World Rugby Sevens Series and the twentieth edition of the New Zealand Sevens. It was held on 26–27 January 2019 at FMG Stadium Waikato, Hamilton.

An invitational competition for women's teams, the Women's Fast Four, was held alongside the men's tournament as the precursor to fully integrated men's and women's tournaments planned for Hamilton in 2020.

== Format ==
The teams are drawn into four pools of four teams each. Each team plays every other team in their pool once. The top two teams from each pool advance to the Cup bracket where teams compete for the Gold, Silver, and bronze medals. The bottom two teams from each group go to the Challenge Trophy bracket.

== Teams ==
Fifteen core teams played in the tournament along with one invitational team, the highest-placing non-core team of the 2018 Oceania Sevens Championship, Tonga:

- Argentina
- Australia
- Canada
- England
- Fiji
- France
- Japan
- Kenya
- New Zealand
- Samoa
- Scotland
- South Africa
- Tonga
- Spain
- United States
- Wales

== Pool stage ==
All times in New Zealand Daylight Time (UTC+13:00)

Key to colours in group tables
Teams that advanced to the Cup Quarterfinal

=== Pool A ===
Team	Pld	W	D	L	PF	PA	PD	Pts
Fiji	3	3	0	0	113	50	+63	9
Australia	3	2	0	1	62	43	+19	7
Argentina	3	1	0	2	72	57	+15	5
Wales	3	0	0	3	19	116	−97	3

26 January 2019
11:30

Australia	17–12	Argentina

Waikato Stadium, Hamilton
Referee: Craig Evans (Wales)

26 January 2019
11:52

Fiji	54–7	Wales

Waikato Stadium, Hamilton
Referee: Sam Grove-White (Scotland)

26 January 2019
15:20

Australia	26–5	Wales

Waikato Stadium, Hamilton
Referee: Jérémy Rozier (France)

26 January 2019
15:42

Fiji	33–24	Argentina

Waikato Stadium, Hamilton
Referee: James Doleman (New Zealand)

26 January 2019
19:30

Argentina	36–7	Wales

Waikato Stadium, Hamilton
Referee: Jordan Way (Australia)

26 January 2019
19:52

Fiji	26–19	Australia

Waikato Stadium, Hamilton
Referee: Richard Kelly (New Zealand)

=== Pool B ===
Team	Pld	W	D	L	PF	PA	PD	Pts
United States	3	3	0	0	82	28	+54	9
Samoa	3	2	0	1	54	56	−2	7
England	3	1	0	2	53	38	+15	5
Tonga	3	0	0	3	26	93	−67	3

26 January 2019
10:44

England	10–12	Samoa

Waikato Stadium, Hamilton
Referee: Richard Kelly (New Zealand)

26 January 2019
11:06

United States	29–7	Tonga

Waikato Stadium, Hamilton
Referee: Jordan Way (Australia)

26 January 2019
14:54

England	36–7	Tonga

Waikato Stadium, Hamilton
Referee: Matt Rodden (Hong Kong)

26 January 2019
15:26

United States	34–14	Samoa

Waikato Stadium, Hamilton
Referee: Richard Haughton (England)

26 January 2019
18:44

Samoa	28–12	Tonga

Waikato Stadium, Hamilton
Referee: Sam Grove-White (Scotland)

26 January 2019
19:06

United States	19–7	England

Waikato Stadium, Hamilton
Referee: Craig Evans (Wales)

=== Pool C ===
Team	Pld	W	D	L	PF	PA	PD	Pts
South Africa	3	3	0	0	72	22	+50	9
Scotland	3	2	0	1	52	57	−5	7
Kenya	3	1	0	2	39	63	−24	5
France	3	0	0	3	41	62	−21	3

26 January 2019
10:00

Scotland	26–21	France

Waikato Stadium, Hamilton
Referee: Richard Haughton (England)

26 January 2019
10:22

South Africa	29–10	Kenya

Waikato Stadium, Hamilton
Referee: Matt Rodden (Hong Kong)

26 January 2019
13:48

Scotland	19–10	Kenya

Waikato Stadium, Hamilton
Referee: Jordan Way (Australia)

26 January 2019
14:10

South Africa	17–5	France

Waikato Stadium, Hamilton
Referee: Richard Kelly (New Zealand)

26 January 2019
18:00

France	15–19	Kenya

Waikato Stadium, Hamilton
Referee: James Doleman (New Zealand)

26 January 2019
18:22

South Africa	26–7	Scotland

Waikato Stadium, Hamilton
Referee: Jérémy Rozier (France)

=== Pool D ===
Team	Pld	W	D	L	PF	PA	PD	Pts
New Zealand	3	3	0	0	125	10	+115	9
Canada	3	1	1	1	48	61	−13	6
Spain	3	1	1	1	34	55	−21	6
Japan	3	0	0	3	19	100	−81	3

26 January 2019
12:14

Spain	12–12	Canada

Waikato Stadium, Hamilton
Referee: James Doleman (New Zealand)

26 January 2019
12:36

New Zealand	52–0	Japan

Waikato Stadium, Hamilton
Referee: Jérémy Rozier (France)

26 January 2019
16:04

Spain	22–19	Japan

Waikato Stadium, Hamilton
Referee: Craig Evans (Wales)

26 January 2019
16:26

New Zealand	49–10	Canada

Waikato Stadium, Hamilton
Referee: Sam Grove-White (Scotland)

26 January 2019
20:14

Canada	26–0	Japan

Waikato Stadium, Hamilton
Referee: Richard Haughton (England)

26 January 2019
20:36

New Zealand	24–0	Spain

Waikato Stadium, Hamilton
Referee: Matt Rodden (Hong Kong)

== Knockout stage ==
=== Thirteenth place ===
Semi-finals
27 January 2019 – 13:10 – Waikato Stadium
Japan	7
Tonga	31
27 January 2019 – 13:32 – Waikato Stadium
Wales	19
France	35

Thirteenth place
27 January 2019 – 17:00 – Waikato Stadium
Tonga	33
France	10

Matches

Semi-finals

27 January 2019
13:10

Japan	7–31	Tonga
Try: Yoshizawa 12'c Con: Sakai (1/1) 12'		Try: Maake 2'c, 5'c Pakalani 6'c Samita 10'm Tupou 13'; Con: Pakalani (3/3) 3', 5', 7'; Samita (0/2)

Waikato Stadium, Hamilton
Referee: Jérémy Rozier (France)

27 January 2019
13:32

Wales	19–35	France
Try: Morgan-Williams 1'c Treharne 2'c Goodchild 14'm Con: Treharne (2/3) 1', 3'		Try: Siega 5'c Laugel 7'c Huyard 8'c N'Gandebe 11'c, 13'; Con: Riva (4/4) 5', 7', 9', 12'; Mazzoleni (1/1) 13'

Waikato Stadium, Hamilton
Referee: James Doleman (New Zealand)

Thirteenth place

27 January 2019
17:00

Tonga	33–10	France
Try: Tapueluelu 1'c Samita 4'c F. Inisi 7'c Sunia 9'c Paea 11'm Con: Maake (4/5) 2', 4', 8', 10'		Try: Parez 7'm Mazzoleni 12'm Con: Riva (0/2)

Waikato Stadium, Hamilton
Referee: Matt Rodden (Hong Kong)

=== Challenge Trophy ===
Quarter-finals
27 January 2019 – 10:00 – Waikato Stadium
Argentina	35
Japan	0
27 January 2019 – 10:22 – Waikato Stadium
Kenya	19
Tonga	12
27 January 2019 – 10:44 – Waikato Stadium
Spain	19
Wales	10
27 January 2019 – 11:06 – Waikato Stadium
England	21
France	5

Challenge Trophy Final
27 January 2019 – 13:54 – Waikato Stadium
Argentina	7
Kenya	24
27 January 2019 – 14:16 – Waikato Stadium
Spain	7
England	38

Final
27 January 2019 – 18:00 – Waikato Stadium
Kenya	7
England	36

Matches

Quarter-finals

27 January 2019
10:00

Argentina	35–0	Japan
Try: Bazan Velez 1'c Carreras (2) 4'c, 7'c Etchart 8'c Sabato 10'c Con: Bazan Velez (5/5) 1', 5', 7', 8', 11'

Waikato Stadium, Hamilton
Referee: Craig Evans (Wales)

27 January 2019
10:22

Kenya	19–12	Tonga
Try: Olindi (2) 0'c, 13'c Ojee 4'm Con: Olindi (2/3) 0', 14'		Try: Paea 6'm Finau 11'c Con: Pakalani (1/2) 11'

Waikato Stadium, Hamilton
Referee: Richard Haughton (England)

27 January 2019
10:44

Spain	19–10	Wales
Try: Pla 3'c Carrión (2) 6'c, 8'm Con: Hernández (2/3) 4', 7'		Try: Dyer 1'm Gasson 13'; Con: Treharne (0/2)

Waikato Stadium, Hamilton
Referee: Jérémy Rozier (France)

27 January 2019
11:06

England	21–5	France
Try: de Carpentier 3'c Norton 6'c Olowofela 7'c Con: Bibby (3/3) 3', 6', 7'		Try: Riva 10'm Con: Mazzoleni (0/1)

Waikato Stadium, Hamilton
Referee: Richard Kelly (New Zealand)

Semi-finals

27 January 2019
13:54

Argentina	7–24	Kenya
Try: Carreras 2'c Con: Bazan Velez (1/1) 3'		Try: Ojee (2) 1'm, 8'm Kuto 10'c Wahinya 12'; Con: Taabu (2/2) 10', 12'; Olindi (0/2)

Waikato Stadium, Hamilton
Referee: Sam Grove-White (Scotland)

27 January 2019
14:16

Spain	7–38	England
Try: Sainz-Trapaga 5'c Con: Hernández (1/1) 6'		Try: Muir 1'c Rodwell 2'm Kerr 7'c Mitchell 7'; Norton (2) 10'c, 13'm Con: Bibby (4/6) 1', 7', 8', 10'

Waikato Stadium, Hamilton
Referee: Craig Evans (Wales)

Challenge Trophy Final

27 January 2019
18:00

Kenya	7–36	England
Try: Onyala 3'c Con: Wahinya (1/1) 4'		Try: Bibby (2) 1'c, 7'; Bowen (2) 5'c, 12'; Norton (2) 6'm, 9'c Con: Bibby (2/3) 1', 5'; Mitchell (1/3) 10'

Waikato Stadium, Hamilton
Referee: Jérémy Rozier (France)

=== Fifth place ===
Semi-finals
27 January 2019 – 15:26 – Waikato Stadium
Canada	19
Samoa	28
27 January 2019 – 15:48 – Waikato Stadium
Australia	14
Scotland	24

Fifth place
27 January 2019 – 18:26 – Waikato Stadium
Samoa	19
Scotland	24

Matches

Semi-finals

27 January 2019
15:26

Canada	19–28	Samoa
Try: Braid 2'm McCloskey 8'c Berna 11'c Con: Kay (2/3) 8', 11'		Try: Afamasaga 0'c Tupou 4'c Asofolau 7'c Tusitala 13'; Con: Alosio (2/2) 1', 13'; Tupou (2/2) 4', 7'

Waikato Stadium, Hamilton
Referee: Matt Rodden (Hong Kong)

27 January 2019
15:48

Australia	14–24	Scotland
Try: Anderson 1'c Longbottom 11'c Con: Porch (1/1) 2'; Coward (1/1) 11'		Try: McFarland (2) 6'c, 8'c Fergusson 7'm Farndale 13'; Con: Lowe (2/4) 6', 8'

Waikato Stadium, Hamilton
Referee: Richard Haughton (England)

Fifth place

27 January 2019
18:26

Samoa	19–24	Scotland
Try: Vaili 1'c Afamasaga 7'c Asofolau 12'm Con: Tupou (2/3) 1', 8'		Try: Fergusson (3) 5'c, 7'm, 10'; Farndale 13'; Con: Lowe (2/4) 5', 14'

Waikato Stadium, Hamilton
Referee: Craig Evans (Wales)

=== Cup ===
Quarter-finals
27 January 2019 – 11:36 – Waikato Stadium
Fiji	33
Canada	7
27 January 2019 – 11:58 – Waikato Stadium
South Africa	28
Samoa	19
27 January 2019 – 12:20 – Waikato Stadium
New Zealand	24
Australia	17
27 January 2019 – 12:42 – Waikato Stadium
United States	19
Scotland	14

Semi-finals
27 January 2019 – 16:16 – Waikato Stadium
Fiji	29
South Africa	7
27 January 2019 – 16:38 – Waikato Stadium
New Zealand	7
United States	17

Final
27 January 2019 – 20:10 – Waikato Stadium
Fiji	38
United States	0
Bronze final
27 January 2019 – 19:10 – Waikato Stadium
South Africa	7
New Zealand	29

Matches

Quarter-finals

27 January 2019
11:36

Fiji	33–7	Canada
Try: Derenalagi 0'c Tuimaba (2) 3'c, 8'c Tuwai 7'c Vakurunabili 12'm Con: Nacuqu (2/2) 0', 3'; Botitu (2/2) 7', 9'; Veilawa (0/1)		Try: Braid 6'; Con: Hirayama (1/1) 6'

Waikato Stadium, Hamilton
Referee: Jordan Way (Australia)

27 January 2019
11:58

South Africa	28–19	Samoa
Try: Dry 6'c Human 8'c Kok 10'c S. Davids 12'c Con: Du Preez (1/1) 6'; S. Davids (3/3) 9', 11', 13'		Try: Afamasaga 4'c Tupou 7'm Tusitala 14'c Con: Tupou (1/2) 5'; Tusitala (1/1) 14'

Waikato Stadium, Hamilton
Referee: James Doleman (New Zealand)

27 January 2019
12:20

New Zealand	24–17	Australia
Try: Collier 3'm Nareki 4'm Ware 7'c Mikkelson 9'c Con: Knewstubb (1/3) 7'; Koroi (1/1) 10'		Try: Kennewell 8'm Holland 13'm Coward 14'c Con: Coward (1/1) 14'; Porch (0/1); Holland (0/1)

Waikato Stadium, Hamilton
Referee: Sam Grove-White (Scotland)

27 January 2019
12:42

United States	19–14	Scotland
Try: Hughes 0'c Tomasin 2'm Isles 4'c Con: Hughes (2/3) 0', 4'		Try: Fergusson 6'c McFarland 11'c Con: Lowe (1/1) 7', 12'

Waikato Stadium, Hamilton
Referee: Matt Rodden (Hong Kong)

Semi-finals

27 January 2019
16:16

Fiji	29–7	South Africa
Try: Nasoko 0'c Tuimaba (2) 4'c, 13'; Botitu 7'm Nacuqu 9'; Con: Nacuqu (1/4) 1'; Botitu (1/1) 5'		Try: S. Davids 12'c Con: S. Davids (1/1) 12'

Waikato Stadium, Hamilton
Referee: Richard Kelly (New Zealand)

27 January 2019
16:38

New Zealand	7–17	United States
Try: Ware 5'; Con: Koroi (1/1) 6'		Try: Hughes 4'm Tomasin 9'c Isles 13'; Con: Hughes (1/3) 10'

Waikato Stadium, Hamilton
Referee: Jordan Way (Australia)

Bronze final

27 January 2019
19:10

South Africa	7–29	New Zealand
Try: Soyizwapi 3'c Con: Davids (1/1) 4'		Try: Ng Shiu (2) 5'c, 8'm Mikkelson 7'c Ravouvou 12'm Dickson 13'm Con: Knewstubb (2/5) 5', 7'

Waikato Stadium, Hamilton
Referee: Sam Grove-White (Scotland)

Cup Final

27 January 2019
20:10

Fiji	38–0	United States
Try: Tuwai (2) 1'm, 12'c Nacuqu 4'm Tuimaba 6'c Naduva (2) 9'c, 14'c Con: Botitu (1/1) 7'; Nacuqu (1/3) 9'; Veilawa (2/2) 12', 14'

Waikato Stadium, Hamilton
Referee: James Doleman (New Zealand)

== Tournament placings ==
Place	Team	Points
1st place, gold medalist(s)	Fiji	22
2nd place, silver medalist(s)	United States	19
3rd place, bronze medalist(s)	New Zealand	17
4	South Africa	15
5	Scotland	13
6	Samoa	12
7	Australia	10
7	Canada	10

Place	Team	Points
9	England	8
10	Kenya	7
11	Argentina	5
11	Spain	5
13	Tonga	3
14	France	2
15	Japan	1
15	Wales	1

Source: World Rugby

== Players ==
=== Scoring leaders ===
Tries scored
Rank	Player	Tries
1	Aminiasi Tuimaba	8
1	Robbie Fergusson	8
3	Carlin Isles	7
4	Dan Norton	6
4	Mateo Carreras	6

Points scored
Rank	Player	Points
1	Waisea Nacuqu	47
2	Robbie Fergusson	42
3	Aminiasi Tuimaba	40
4	Madison Hughes	39
5	Alatasi Tupuo	37

Source: World Rugby

=== Dream Team ===
The following seven players were selected to the tournament Dream Team at the conclusion of the tournament:

Forwards	Backs
(United States) Ben Pinkelman (Fiji) Kalione Nasoko (Fiji) Meli Derenalagi	(United States) Carlin Isles (Fiji) Vilimoni Botitu (United States) Folau Niua (Fiji) Aminiasi Tuimaba

== See also ==
- World Rugby Sevens Series
- 2018–19 World Rugby Sevens Series
- 2019 New Zealand Women's Sevens Fast Four
- World Rugby

World Sevens Series XX
Preceded by 2018 South Africa Sevens	2019 New Zealand Sevens	Succeeded by 2019 Sydney Sevens
New Zealand Sevens
Preceded by 2018 New Zealand Sevens	2019 New Zealand Sevens	Succeeded by 2020 New Zealand Sevens
