= Rugby sevens at the 2020 Summer Olympics – Men's tournament =

2020 Men's Olympic Rugby Sevens Tournament
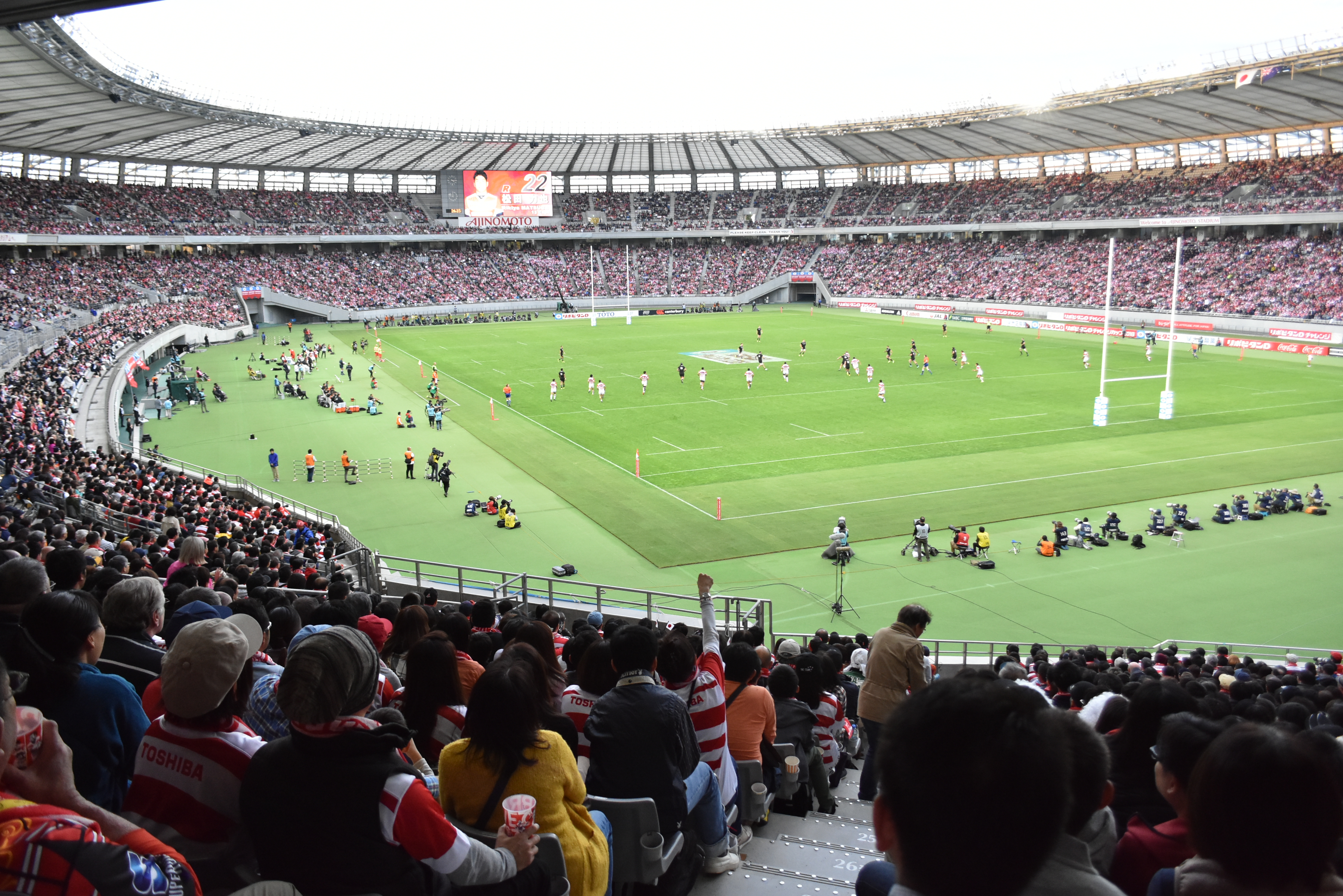
- Tokyo Stadium, where the Men's Rugby Sevens tournament was played

Tournament details
- Host: Japan
- Venue: Tokyo Stadium
- Date: 26–28 July 2021
- Teams: 12

Final positions
- Champions: Fiji (2nd title)
- Runner-up: New Zealand
- Third place: Argentina
- Fourth place: Great Britain

Tournament statistics
- Matches played: 34
- Tries scored: 193 (5.68 per match)
- Top scorer(s): (New Zealand) Andrew Knewstubb (37 points)
- Most tries: (Argentina) Marcos Moneta (6 tries)

The men's rugby sevens tournament at the 2020 Summer Olympics was held in Japan. It was hosted at Tokyo Stadium, which also served as a host stadium of the 2019 Rugby World Cup. The tournament was played over three days from 26 to 28 July 2021. The tournament was won by the returning champions, Fiji.

== Competition schedule ==
Legend

P	Pool Stage	PM	Placing Matches	¼	Quarter-Finals	½	Semi-Finals	B	Bronze Medal Match	F	Gold Medal Match

Schedule
Date	Jul 26		Jul 27			Jul 28				
Event	M	E	M	E		M		E		
Men's	P			PM	¼	PM	½	PM	B	F

== Qualification ==
Event	Dates	Location	Quotas	Qualifier
Host	—N/a	—N/a	1	Japan
2018–19 World Rugby Sevens Series	30 November 2018 – 2 June 2019	Various	4	Fiji
2018–19 World Rugby Sevens Series	30 November 2018 – 2 June 2019	Various	4	United States
2018–19 World Rugby Sevens Series	30 November 2018 – 2 June 2019	Various	4	New Zealand
2018–19 World Rugby Sevens Series	30 November 2018 – 2 June 2019	Various	4	South Africa
2019 South American Qualifying Tournament	29–30 June 2019	(Chile) Santiago	1	Argentina
2019 RAN Sevens	6–7 July 2019	(Cayman Islands) George Town	1	Canada
2019 European Qualifying Tournament	13–14 July 2019	(France) Colomiers	1	Great Britain (Note: Great Britain earned qualification through England's placement as they were nominated as the country to earn qualification for Great Britain. Rugby sevens players from Scotland and Wales, however, were eligible to be selected for the British team at the Olympic Games.)
2019 Oceania Sevens Championship	7–9 November 2019	(Fiji) Suva	1	Australia
2019 Africa Men's Sevens	8–9 November 2019	(South Africa) Johannesburg	1	Kenya
2019 Asian Qualifying Tournament	23–24 November 2019	(South Korea) Incheon	1	South Korea
2020 Final Olympic Qualification Tournament	19–20 June 2021	Monaco	1	Ireland (Note: The Irish rugby union teams represent the entire island of Ireland, and when representing the IRFU fly the four provinces flag of the IRFU as Ireland. In the Olympic Games, however, they represent the Olympic Council of Ireland, and therefore play under the national flag of (the Republic of) Ireland. Northern Ireland players are, however, eligible to represent the team regardless of flag. According to the Good Friday Agreement, people who are born in Northern Ireland with Irish or British lineage can automatically obtain the nationality of (the Republic of) Ireland.)
Total				12

- Notes:

== Group stage ==
=== Group A ===
Pos	Team	Pld	W	D	L	PF	PA	PD	Pts	Qualification
1	New Zealand	3	3	0	0	99	31	+68	9	Quarter-finals
2	Argentina	3	2	0	1	99	54	+45	7	Quarter-finals
3	Australia	3	1	0	2	73	48	+25	5	Quarter-finals
4	South Korea	3	0	0	3	10	148	−138	3	

Source: Tokyo 2020 and World Rugby
Rules for classification: 1) Points; 2) Head-to-head result; 3) Point difference; 4) Points scored.

26 July 2021
10:00

New Zealand	50–5	South Korea
Try: Knewstubb 2' c Mikkelson (2) 7' c, 8' m Penalty try 8'; Warbrick (2) 10' c, 14' m Nanai-Seturo 12' m McGarvey-Black 13' c Con: Knewstubb (2/3) 2', 7'; McGarvey-Black (2/3) 10', 13'; Baker (0/1)	(Tokyo 2020)	Try: Jeong 5' m Con: Lee (0/1)

Tokyo Stadium, Tokyo
Attendance: 0
Referee: Sam Grove-White (Scotland)

26 July 2021
10:30

Australia	19–29	Argentina
Try: Turner (2) 9' m, 12' c Kerevi 13' c Con: Longbottom (2/3) 12', 13'	(Tokyo 2020)	Try: Cinti 1' m Osadczuk 4' m Moneta 5' c Mendy 7' c Bazán 14' m Con: Mare (2/4) 6', 7'; Bazán (0/1)

Tokyo Stadium, Tokyo
Attendance: 0
Referee: Paulo Duarte (Portugal)

26 July 2021
17:30

New Zealand	35–14	Argentina
Try: McGarvey-Black 4' c Molia 6' c Webber 10' c Mikkelson 12' c Warbrick 14' c Con: McGarvey-Black (2/2) 5', 7'; Webber (1/1) 10'; Knewstubb (2/2) 13', 14'	(Tokyo 2020)	Try: Moneta 2' c González 8' c Con: Mare (2/2) 2', 8'

Tokyo Stadium, Tokyo
Attendance: 0
Referee: Craig Evans (Wales)

26 July 2021
18:00

Australia	42–5	South Korea
Try: Longbottom 1' c Roache 2' c Miller (2) 7' c, 8' c Malouf 10' c Pietsch 13' c Con: Longbottom (4/4) 1', 2', 7', 10'; Miller (1/1) 8'; Coward (1/1) 13'	(Tokyo 2020)	Try: Coquillard 9' m Con: Coquillard (0/1)

Tokyo Stadium, Tokyo
Attendance: 0
Referee: Nehuén Jauri Rivero (Argentina)

27 July 2021
10:00

Argentina	56–0	South Korea
Try: Bazán 1' c Osadczuk 2' c Mare 4' c González 7' c Isgro 8' c Schulz 9' c Revol 12' c Mendy 13' c Con: Mare (5/5) 1', 3', 4', 7', 8'; Revol (2/2) 9', 13' del Mestre (1/1) 12'	(Tokyo 2020)

Tokyo Stadium, Tokyo
Attendance: 0
Referee: Matthew Rodden (Hong Kong)

27 July 2021
10:30

New Zealand	14–12	Australia
Try: Collier 8' c Knewstubb 10' c Con: Knewstubb (2/2) 8', 10'	(Tokyo 2020)	Try: Kerevi 1' c Malouf 5' m Con: Holland (1/2) 1'

Tokyo Stadium, Tokyo
Attendance: 0
Referee: Sam Grove-White (Scotland)

=== Group B ===
Pos	Team	Pld	W	D	L	PF	PA	PD	Pts	Qualification
1	Fiji	3	3	0	0	85	40	+45	9	Quarter-finals
2	Great Britain	3	2	0	1	65	33	+32	7	Quarter-finals
3	Canada	3	1	0	2	50	64	−14	5	Quarter-finals
4	Japan (H)	3	0	0	3	31	94	−63	3	

Source: Tokyo 2020 and World Rugby
Rules for classification: 1) Points; 2) Head-to-head result; 3) Point difference; 4) Points scored.
(H) Hosts

26 July 2021
9:00

Fiji	24–19	Japan
Try: Wainiqolo 1' c Masi 4' m Nacuqu (2) 10' c, 11' m Con: Bolaca (1/2) 1'; Nacuqu (1/1) 10'; Nasoko (0/1)	(Tokyo 2020)	Try: Matsui 2' c Tuqiri 7' c Soejima 8' m Con: Fujita (2/3) 3', 7'

Tokyo Stadium, Tokyo
Attendance: 0
Referee: Damon Murphy (Australia)

26 July 2021
9:30

Great Britain	24–0	Canada
Try: Norton (2) 7' c, 8' m McCann 11' c Fergusson 7' m Con: Bibby (2/3) 7', 12'; Fergusson (0/1)	(Tokyo 2020)

Tokyo Stadium, Tokyo
Attendance: 0
Referee: James Doleman (New Zealand)

26 July 2021
16:30

Great Britain	34–0	Japan
Try: Bibby 1' m Mitchell 2' m Glover 7' c Harris 8' m Waddleton 9' m Davis 12' c Con: Bibby (2/6) 7', 12'	(Tokyo 2020)

Tokyo Stadium, Tokyo
Attendance: 0
Referee: Paulo Duarte (Portugal)

26 July 2021
17:00

Fiji	28–14	Canada
Try: Bolaca 1' c Wainiqolo 4' c Tuimaba 11' c Tuivuaka 14' c Con: Bolaca (2/2) 2', 4'; Nacuqu (2/2) 12', 14'	(Tokyo 2020)	Try: Hirayama 7' c Douglas 12' c Con: Hirayama (2/2) 7', 13'

Tokyo Stadium, Tokyo
Attendance: 0
Referee: Jordan Way (Australia)

27 July 2021
9:00

Canada	36–12	Japan
Try: Braid (3) 2' c, 3' m, 9' m Sauder 5' c Berna 10' m Douglas 12' c Con: Hirayama (2/5) 2', 5'; Kay (1/1) 12'	(Tokyo 2020)	Try: Hano 8' m Matsui 13' c Con: Bourke (0/1); Goya (1/1) 13'

Tokyo Stadium, Tokyo
Attendance: 0
Referee: Damon Murphy (Australia)

27 July 2021
9:30

Fiji	33–7	Great Britain
Try: Tuivuaka (2) 2' m, 8' c Maqala 3' c Wainiqolo 7' c Tuimaba 14' c Con: Bolaca (3/4) 4', 7', 8'; Nasoko (1/1) 14'	(Tokyo 2020)	Try: Harris 10' c Con: Bibby (1/1) 10'

Tokyo Stadium, Tokyo
Attendance: 0
Referee: James Doleman (New Zealand)

=== Group C ===
Pos	Team	Pld	W	D	L	PF	PA	PD	Pts	Qualification
1	South Africa	3	3	0	0	64	31	+33	9	Quarter-finals
2	United States	3	2	0	1	50	48	+2	7	Quarter-finals
3	Ireland	3	1	0	2	43	59	−16	5	
4	Kenya	3	0	0	3	26	45	−19	3	

Updated to match(es) played on 26 July 2021. Source: Tokyo 2020 and World Rugby
Rules for classification: 1) Points; 2) Head-to-head result; 3) Point difference; 4) Points scored.

26 July 2021
11:00

South Africa	33–14	Ireland
Try: Z. Davids 2' c Visser 6' c Geduld 8' c Dry 12' c Gans 13' m Con: S. Davids (4/5) 2', 6', 8', 12'	(Tokyo 2020)	Try: Mullin 7' c Kennedy 10' c Con: Dardis (2/2) 7', 10'

Tokyo Stadium, Tokyo
Attendance: 0
Referee: Craig Evans (Wales)

26 July 2021
11:30

United States	19–14	Kenya
Try: Isles 2' m Iosefo 4' c Hughes 13' c Con: Hughes (1/2) 5'; Tomasin (1/1) 14'	(Tokyo 2020)	Try: Injera 6' c Oluoch 9' c Con: Agero (2/2) 7', 10'

Tokyo Stadium, Tokyo
Attendance: 0
Referee: Jordan Way (Australia)

26 July 2021
18:30

United States	19–17	Ireland
Try: Baker 1' c Hughes 3' m Tomasin 10' c Con: Hughes (2/3) 2', 10'	(Tokyo 2020)	Try: Lennox 7' m McNulty 8' m Horan 14' c Con: Dardis (0/2); Roche (1/1) 14'

Tokyo Stadium, Tokyo
Attendance: 0
Referee: James Doleman (New Zealand)

26 July 2021
19:00

South Africa	14–5	Kenya
Try: S. Davids 2' c Soyizwapi 3' c Con: du Preez (2/2) 2', 4'	(Tokyo 2020)	Try: Injera 6' m Con: Agero (0/1)

Tokyo Stadium, Tokyo
Attendance: 0
Referee: Damon Murphy (Australia)

27 July 2021
11:00

Kenya	7–12	Ireland
Try: Onyala 13' c Con: Taabu (1/1) 13'	(Tokyo 2020)	Try: Lennox 1' m McNulty 2' c Con: Dardis (1/2) 2'

Tokyo Stadium, Tokyo
Attendance: 0
Referee: Jordan Way (Australia)

27 July 2021
11:30

South Africa	17–12	United States
Try: S. Davids (2) 6' m, 10' m Gans 8' c Con: S. Davids (1/3) 9'	(Tokyo 2020)	Try: Schroeder 1' m Thompson 12' c Con: Melphy (0/1); Hughes (1/1) 13'

Tokyo Stadium, Tokyo
Attendance: 0
Referee: Craig Evans (Wales)

=== Ranking of third-placed teams ===
The top two of the third-placed teams advance to the knockout rounds.

Pos	Grp	Team	Pld	W	D	L	PF	PA	PD	Pts	Qualification
1	A	Australia	3	1	0	2	73	48	+25	5	Quarter-finals
2	B	Canada	3	1	0	2	50	64	−14	5	Quarter-finals
3	C	Ireland	3	1	0	2	43	59	−16	5	

Source: Tokyo 2020 and World Rugby
Rules for classification: 1) Points; 2) Point difference; 3) Points scored.

== Knockout stage ==
=== 9–12th place playoff ===
Semi-finals
27 July – Tokyo Stadium
Ireland	31
South Korea	0
27 July – Tokyo Stadium
Kenya	21
Japan	7

9th place match
28 July – Tokyo Stadium
Ireland	0
Kenya	22
11th place match
28 July – Tokyo Stadium
South Korea	19
Japan	31

==== Semi-finals ====
27 July 2021
16:30

Ireland	31–0	South Korea
Try: Roche 1' m Conroy (2) 2' m, 13' c Mullin (2) 11' c, 14' c Con: Roche (0/2); Dardis (3/3) 12', 13', 14'	(Tokyo 2020)

Tokyo Stadium, Tokyo
Attendance: 0
Referee: Francisco González (Uruguay)

27 July 2021
17:00

Kenya	21–7	Japan
Try: Otieno 3' c Oluoch 5' c Amonde 12' c Con: Olindi (3/3) 4', 5', 12'	(Tokyo 2020)	Try: Matsui 1' c Con: Kano (1/1) 2'

Tokyo Stadium, Tokyo
Attendance: 0
Referee: Damián Schneider (Argentina)

==== Eleventh place match ====
28 July 2021
9:00

South Korea	19–31	Japan
Try: Coquillard 1' c Jang 4' m Jeong 10' c Con: Coquillard (2/3) 1', 10'	(Tokyo 2020)	Try: Tuqiri 2' c Hikosaka 5' c Kano 7' m Matsui 8' c Hano 11' m Con: Kano (3/4) 2', 6', 8'; Fujita (0/1)

Tokyo Stadium, Tokyo
Attendance: 0
Referee: Richard Haughton (England)

==== Ninth place match ====
28 July 2021
9:30

Ireland	0–22	Kenya
	(Tokyo 2020)	Try: Olindi 5' c Ojee 10' m Ambaka 12' m Taabu 14' m Con: Olindi (1/1) 5'; Taabu (0/2); Amonde (0/1)

Tokyo Stadium, Tokyo
Attendance: 0
Referee: Damián Schneider (Argentina)

=== 5–8th place playoff ===
Semi-finals
28 July – Tokyo Stadium
Canada	14
United States	21
28 July – Tokyo Stadium
South Africa	22
Australia	19

5th place match
28 July – Tokyo Stadium
United States	7
South Africa	28
7th place match
28 July – Tokyo Stadium
Canada	7
Australia	26

==== Semi-finals ====
28 July 2021
10:00

Canada	14–21	United States
Try: Jones 6' c Douglas 13' c Con: Hirayama (2/2) 7', 13'	(Tokyo 2020)	Try: Isles (2) 2' c, 14' c Iosefo 12' c Con: Hughes (3/3) 2', 12', 14'

Tokyo Stadium, Tokyo
Attendance: 0
Referee: Francisco González (Uruguay)

28 July 2021
10:30

South Africa	22–19	Australia
Try: Soyizwapi 1' m Brown (2) 5' m, 7' c Pretorius 11' m Con: Brown (0/1); Geduld (1/2) 7' du Preez (0/1)	(Tokyo 2020)	Try: Miller 8' c Turner 10' m Longbottom 12' c Con: Miller (1/1) 9'; Coward (0/1); Longbottom (1/1) 13'

Tokyo Stadium, Tokyo
Attendance: 0
Referee: Craig Evans (Wales)

==== Seventh place match ====
28 July 2021
16:30

Canada	7–26	Australia
Try: Braid 3' c Con: Hirayama (1/1) 3'	(Tokyo 2020)	Try: Lawson 1' c Anderson 6' m Malouf 9' c Miller 12' c Con: Coward (1/1) 2'; Anderson (0/1); Longbottom (2/2) 9', 12'

Tokyo Stadium, Tokyo
Attendance: 0
Referee: Paulo Duarte (Portugal)

==== Fifth place match ====
28 July 2021
17:00

United States	7–28	South Africa
Try: Tomasin 4' c Con: Hughes (1/1) 4'	(Tokyo 2020)	Try: Geduld 2' c Makata 7' c Arendse 12' c Gans 14' c Con: Brown (2/2) 2', 7' du Preez (2/2) 13', 14'

Tokyo Stadium, Tokyo
Attendance: 0
Referee: Sam Grove-White (Scotland)

=== Medal playoff ===
Quarter-finals
27 July – Tokyo Stadium
New Zealand	21
Canada	10
27 July – Tokyo Stadium
Great Britain	26
United States	21
27 July – Tokyo Stadium
South Africa	14
Argentina	19
27 July – Tokyo Stadium
Fiji	19
Australia	0

Semi-finals
28 July – Tokyo Stadium
New Zealand	29
Great Britain	7
28 July – Tokyo Stadium
Argentina	14
Fiji	26

Gold medal match
28 July – Tokyo Stadium
New Zealand	12
Fiji	27
Bronze medal match
28 July – Tokyo Stadium
Great Britain	12
Argentina	17

==== Quarter-finals ====
27 July 2021
17:30

New Zealand	21–10	Canada
Try: Knewstubb 4' c Curry (2) 6' c, 7' c Con: Knewstubb (2/2) 4', 6'; Curry (1/1) 7'	(Tokyo 2020)	Try: Kay 13' m Jones 14' m Con: Kay (0/2)

Tokyo Stadium, Tokyo
Attendance: 0
Referee: Jordan Way (Australia)

27 July 2021
18:00

Great Britain	26–21	United States
Try: Lindsay-Hague 6' c Harris 8' c Davis 10' c Norton 11' m Con: Bibby (3/4) 7', 8', 10'	(Tokyo 2020)	Try: Barrett 1' c Baker (2) 3' c, 4' c Con: Hughes (3/3) 1', 3', 4'

Tokyo Stadium, Tokyo
Attendance: 0
Referee: James Doleman (New Zealand)

27 July 2021
18:30

South Africa	14–19	Argentina
Try: S. Davids 1' c Penalty try 13'; Con: Geduld (1/1) 1'	(Tokyo 2020)	Try: Moneta (2) 4' c, 7' c Álvarez 12' m Con: Mare (2/2) 5', 7'; Bazán (0/1)

Tokyo Stadium, Tokyo
Attendance: 0
Referee: Damon Murphy (Australia)

27 July 2021
19:00

Fiji	19–0	Australia
Try: Tuwai (2) 3' c, 11' c Tuimaba 12' m Con: Bolaca (1/1); Botitu (1/2) 11'	(Tokyo 2020)

Tokyo Stadium, Tokyo
Attendance: 0
Referee: Craig Evans (Wales)

==== Semi-finals ====
28 July 2021
11:00

New Zealand	29–7	Great Britain
Try: Curry (2) 2' c, 13' m Ware (2) 7' c, 9' m Collier 10' m Con: Knewstubb (2/4) 2', 7'; McGarvey-Black (0/1)	(Tokyo 2020)	Try: Norton 3' c Con: Bibby (1/1) 3'

Tokyo Stadium, Tokyo
Attendance: 0
Referee: Damon Murphy (Australia)

28 July 2021
11:30

Argentina	14–26	Fiji
Try: Moneta 6' c Mendy 7' c Con: Mare (2/2) 6', 7'	(Tokyo 2020)	Try: Maqala 2' m Derenalagi 4' c Wainiqolo 8' c Radradra 11' c Con: Bolaca (1/2) 4'; Tuwai (1/1) 9'; Botitu (1/1) 11'

Tokyo Stadium, Tokyo
Attendance: 0
Referee: James Doleman (New Zealand)

==== Bronze medal match ====
28 July 2021
17:30

Great Britain	12–17	Argentina (bronze)
Try: Harris 1' m Lindsay-Hague 9' c Con: Bibby (1/2) 10'	(Tokyo 2020)	Try: Bazán 4' m Moneta 5' c Mendy 11' m Con: Mare (1/3) 6'

Tokyo Stadium, Tokyo
Attendance: 0
Referee: James Doleman (New Zealand)

==== Gold medal match ====
28 July 2021
18:00

(silver) New Zealand	12–27	Fiji (gold)
Try: Curry 3' m Molia 8' c Con: Knewstubb (1/2) 8'	(Tokyo 2020)	Try: Derenalagi 1' m Maqala 3' c Wainiqolo 4' c Tuivuaka 11' m Con: Bolaca (2/3) 3', 5'; Nacuqu (0/1); Pen: Nacuqu (1/1) 14'

Tokyo Stadium, Tokyo
Attendance: 0
Referee: Damon Murphy (Australia)

Team details

New Zealand	Fiji

FW	1	Scott Curry
FW	2	Tim Mikkelson (c)
FW	5	Dylan Collier
BK	8	Andrew Knewstubb
BK	9	Regan Ware
BK	11	Joe Webber
BK	12	Sione Molia
Substitutes:
FW	3	Tone Ng Shiu
BK	4	Etene Nanai-Seturo
BK	6	Ngarohi McGarvey-Black
FW	7	Amanaki Nicole
BK	10	Kurt Baker
Head Coach:
Clark Laidlaw

FW	1	Josua Vakurunabili
FW	2	Iosefo Masi
FW	4	Jiuta Wainiqolo
FW	6	Meli Derenalagi
BK	9	Jerry Tuwai (c)
BK	12	Napolioni Bolaca
BK	13	Sireli Maqala
Substitutes:
FW	3	Kalione Nasoko
FW	5	Asaeli Tuivuaka
BK	7	Vilimoni Botitu
BK	8	Waisea Nacuqu
BK	11	Aminiasi Tuimaba
Head Coach:
Gareth Baber

== Final ranking ==
Rank	Team	Matches	Points	Avg points	Tries	Avg tries
1st place, gold medalist(s)	Fiji	6	157	26.17	24	4.00
2nd place, silver medalist(s)	New Zealand	6	161	26.83	24	4.00
3rd place, bronze medalist(s)	Argentina	6	149	24.83	23	3.83
4	Great Britain	6	110	18.33	18	3.00
5	South Africa	6	128	21.50	19	3.17
6	United States	6	99	16.50	15	2.50
7	Australia	6	118	19.67	18	3.00
8	Canada	6	81	13.50	13	2.17
9	Kenya	5	69	13.80	11	2.20
10	Ireland	5	74	14.80	12	2.40
11	Japan	5	69	13.80	11	2.20
12	South Korea	5	29	5.80	5	1.00

== Player statistics ==
=== Try scorers ===
6 tries

- (Argentina) Marcos Moneta

5 tries

- (New Zealand) Scott Curry
- (Fiji) Jiuta Wainiqolo

4 tries

- (Argentina) Ignacio Mendy
- (Australia) Lachie Miller
- (Canada) Connor Braid
- (Fiji) Asaeli Tuivuaka
- (United Kingdom) Ben Harris
- (United Kingdom) Dan Norton
- (Japan) Chihito Matsui
- (South Africa) Selvyn Davids

3 tries

- (Argentina) Lautaro Bazán
- (Australia) Nick Malouf
- (Australia) Josh Turner
- (Canada) Justin Douglas
- (Fiji) Sireli Maqala
- (Fiji) Aminiasi Tuimaba
- (Republic of Ireland) Gavin Mullin
- (New Zealand) Andrew Knewstubb
- (New Zealand) Tim Mikkelson
- (New Zealand) William Warbrick
- (South Africa) Stedman Gans
- (United States) Perry Baker
- (United States) Carlin Isles

2 tries

- (Argentina) Luciano González
- (Argentina) Matías Osadczuk
- (Australia) Samu Kerevi
- (Australia) Maurice Longbottom
- (Canada) Harry Jones
- (Fiji) Meli Derenalagi
- (Fiji) Waisea Nacuqu

2 tries (cont.)

- (Fiji) Jerry Tuwai
- (United Kingdom) Alex Davis
- (United Kingdom) Ollie Lindsay-Hague
- (Republic of Ireland) Jordan Conroy
- (Republic of Ireland) Hugo Lennox
- (Republic of Ireland) Harry McNulty
- (Japan) Kazushi Hano
- (Japan) Lote Tuqiri
- (Kenya) Collins Injera
- (Kenya) Jeff Oluoch
- (New Zealand) Dylan Collier
- (New Zealand) Ngarohi McGarvey-Black
- (New Zealand) Sione Molia
- (New Zealand) Regan Ware
- (South Africa) Ronald Brown
- (South Africa) Justin Geduld
- (South Africa) Siviwe Soyizwapi
- (South Korea) Andre Jin Coquillard
- (South Korea) Yeon Sik Jeong
- (United States) Madison Hughes
- (United States) Martin Iosefo
- (United States) Stephen Tomasin

1 try

- (Argentina) Santiago Álvarez
- (Argentina) Lucio Cinti
- (Argentina) Rodrigo Isgro
- (Argentina) Santiago Mare
- (Argentina) Gastón Revol
- (Argentina) Germán Schulz
- (Australia) Lachie Anderson
- (Australia) Nathan Lawson
- (Australia) Dylan Pietsch
- (Australia) Dietrich Roache
- (Canada) Phil Berna
- (Canada) Nathan Hirayama
- (Canada) Patrick Kay

1 try (cont.)

- (Canada) Theo Sauder
- (Fiji) Napolioni Bolaca
- (Fiji) Iosefo Masi
- (Fiji) Semi Radradra
- (United Kingdom) Dan Bibby
- (United Kingdom) Robbie Fergusson
- (United Kingdom) Harry Glover
- (United Kingdom) Ross McCann
- (United Kingdom) Tom Mitchell
- (United Kingdom) Ethan Waddleton
- (Republic of Ireland) Foster Horan
- (Republic of Ireland) Terry Kennedy
- (Republic of Ireland) Mark Roche
- (Japan) Masakatsu Hikosaka
- (Japan) Ryota Kano
- (Japan) Kameli Soejima
- (Kenya) Willy Ambaka
- (Kenya) Andrew Amonde
- (Kenya) Jacob Ojee
- (Kenya) Johnstone Olindi
- (Kenya) Vincent Onyala
- (Kenya) Alvin Otieno
- (Kenya) Daniel Taabu
- (New Zealand) Etene Nanai-Seturo
- (New Zealand) Joe Webber
- (South Africa) Kurt-Lee Arendse
- (South Africa) Zain Davids
- (South Africa) Chris Dry
- (South Africa) Sako Makata
- (South Africa) JC Pretorius
- (South Africa) Impi Visser
- (South Korea) Jeong Min Jang
- (United States) Danny Barrett
- (United States) Joe Schroeder
- (United States) Brett Thompson

=== Point scorers ===
37 points

- (New Zealand) Andrew Knewstubb

33 points

- (Argentina) Santiago Mare

32 points

- (United States) Madison Hughes

30 points

- (Argentina) Marcos Moneta
- (South Africa) Selvyn Davids

28 points

- (Australia) Maurice Longbottom

27 points

- (New Zealand) Scott Curry

25 points

- (Fiji) Napolioni Bolaca
- (Fiji) Jiuta Wainiqolo
- (United Kingdom) Dan Bibby

24 points

- (Australia) Lachie Miller

20 points

- (Argentina) Ignacio Mendy
- (Canada) Connor Braid
- (Fiji) Asaeli Tuivuaka
- (United Kingdom) Ben Harris
- (United Kingdom) Dan Norton
- (Japan) Chihito Matsui

19 points

- (Canada) Nathan Hirayama
- (Fiji) Waisea Nacuqu

18 points

- (New Zealand) Ngarohi McGarvey-Black

15 points

- (Argentina) Lautaro Bazán
- (Australia) Nick Malouf
- (Australia) Josh Turner
- (Canada) Justin Douglas
- (Fiji) Sireli Maqala
- (Fiji) Aminiasi Tuimaba
- (Republic of Ireland) Gavin Mullin
- (New Zealand) Tim Mikkelson
- (New Zealand) William Warbrick
- (South Africa) Stedman Gans
- (United States) Perry Baker
- (United States) Carlin Isles

14 points

- (South Africa) Ronald Brown
- (South Africa) Justin Geduld
- (South Korea) Andre Jin Coquillard

13 points

- (Japan) Ryota Kano
- (Kenya) Johnstone Olindi

12 points

- (Fiji) Jerry Tuwai
- (Republic of Ireland) Billy Dardis
- (United States) Stephen Tomasin

10 points

- (Argentina) Luciano González
- (Argentina) Matías Osadczuk
- (Australia) Samu Kerevi
- (Canada) Harry Jones
- (Fiji) Meli Derenalagi
- (United Kingdom) Alex Davis
- (United Kingdom) Ollie Lindsay-Hague
- (Republic of Ireland) Jordan Conroy
- (Republic of Ireland) Hugo Lennox
- (Republic of Ireland) Harry McNulty
- (Japan) Kazushi Hano
- (Japan) Lote Tuqiri
- (Kenya) Collins Injera
- (Kenya) Jeff Oluoch
- (New Zealand) Dylan Collier
- (New Zealand) Sione Molia
- (New Zealand) Regan Ware
- (South Africa) Siviwe Soyizwapi
- (South Korea) Andre Jin Coquillard
- (South Korea) Yeon Sik Jeong
- (United States) Martin Iosefo

9 points

- (Argentina) Gastón Revol

8 points

- (South Africa) Branco du Preez

7 points

- (Canada) Patrick Kay
- (Republic of Ireland) Mark Roche
- (Kenya) Daniel Taabu
- (New Zealand) Joe Webber

5 points

- (Argentina) Santiago Álvarez
- (Argentina) Lucio Cinti

5 points (cont.)

- (Argentina) Rodrigo Isgro
- (Argentina) Germán Schulz
- (Australia) Lachie Anderson
- (Australia) Nathan Lawson
- (Australia) Dylan Pietsch
- (Australia) Dietrich Roache
- (Canada) Phil Berna
- (Canada) Theo Sauder
- (Fiji) Iosefo Masi
- (Fiji) Semi Radradra
- (United Kingdom) Robbie Fergusson
- (United Kingdom) Harry Glover
- (United Kingdom) Ross McCann
- (United Kingdom) Tom Mitchell
- (United Kingdom) Ethan Waddleton
- (Republic of Ireland) Foster Horan
- (Republic of Ireland) Terry Kennedy
- (Japan) Masakatsu Hikosaka
- (Japan) Kameli Soejima
- (Kenya) Willy Ambaka
- (Kenya) Andrew Amonde
- (Kenya) Jacob Ojee
- (Kenya) Vincent Onyala
- (Kenya) Alvin Otieno
- (New Zealand) Etene Nanai-Seturo
- (South Africa) Kurt-Lee Arendse
- (South Africa) Zain Davids
- (South Africa) Chris Dry
- (South Africa) Sako Makata
- (South Africa) JC Pretorius
- (South Africa) Impi Visser
- (South Korea) Jeong Min Jang
- (United States) Danny Barrett
- (United States) Joe Schroeder
- (United States) Brett Thompson

4 points

- (Australia) Josh Coward
- (Fiji) Vilimoni Botitu
- (Japan) Yoshikazu Fujita
- (Kenya) Eden Agero

2 points

- (Argentina) Felipe del Mestre
- (Australia) Lewis Holland
- (Fiji) Kalione Nasoko
- (Japan) Kazuhiro Goya
