= 2018–19 World Rugby Sevens Series =

20th annual international series in men's rugby sevens

2018–19 World Rugby Sevens
- Series XX
- Hosts: United Arab Emirates; South Africa; Australia; New Zealand; United States; Canada; Hong Kong; England; France
- Date: 30 Nov 2018 – 2 Jun 2019
- Nations: 21

Final positions
- Champions: Fiji
- Runners-up: United States
- Third: New Zealand

Series details
- Top try scorer: Carlin Isles (52)
- Top point scorer: Andrew Knewstubb (307)

The 2018–19 World Rugby Sevens Series, known for sponsorship reasons as the HSBC World Rugby Sevens Series, was the 20th annual series of rugby sevens tournaments for national men's rugby sevens teams. The Sevens Series has been run by World Rugby since 1999–2000. This series also, for the second time, doubled as a qualifier for the 2020 Summer Olympics, with the top four countries qualifying automatically.

Fiji finished first in the Series, winning five of the ten tournaments. The United States finished in a best-ever second place, reaching the semifinals in all ten tournaments. The relegation battle was a three-way competition going into the final rounds involving Japan, Kenya, and Wales, with Japan finishing last to be relegated from the Series next season. The World Series Qualifier tournament saw Ireland promoted to core status for the first time for the 2019–20 season.

== Core teams ==
- Argentina
- Australia
- Canada
- England
- Fiji
- France
- Japan
- Kenya
- New Zealand
- Samoa
- Scotland
- South Africa
- Spain
- United States
- Wales

Japan was promoted to core team status for the season after winning the 2018 Hong Kong Sevens qualifier. They replaced Russia, which was relegated after finishing as the last place core team on the 2017–18 World Rugby Sevens Series.

== Tour venues ==
The official schedule for the 2018–19 World Rugby Sevens Series was:

2018–19 Venues
Leg	Stadium	City	Dates	Winner
United Arab Emirates	The Sevens Stadium	Dubai	30 November – 1 December 2018	New Zealand
South Africa	Cape Town Stadium	Cape Town	8–9 December 2018	Fiji
New Zealand	FMG Stadium Waikato	Hamilton	26–27 January 2019	Fiji
Australia	Spotless Stadium	Sydney	2–3 February 2019	New Zealand
United States	Sam Boyd Stadium	Las Vegas	1–3 March 2019	United States
Canada	BC Place	Vancouver	9–10 March 2019	South Africa
Hong Kong	Hong Kong Stadium	Hong Kong	5–7 April 2019	Fiji
Singapore	National Stadium	Singapore	13–14 April 2019	South Africa
England	Twickenham Stadium	London	25–26 May 2019	Fiji
France	Stade Jean-Bouin	Paris	1–2 June 2019	Fiji

== Standings ==
The final standings after completion of the ten tournaments of the series are shown in the table below.

The points awarded to teams at each tournament, as well as the overall season totals, are shown. Gold indicates the event champions. Silver indicates the event runner-ups. Bronze indicates the event third place finishers. A dash (–) is recorded in the event column if a team did not compete at a tournament.

Official standings for the 2018–19 series were:

2018–19 World Rugby Sevens – Series XX
Pos.	Event Team	Dubai	Cape Town	Hamilton	Sydney	Las Vegas	Vancouver	Hong Kong	Singapore	London	Paris	Points total	Points difference
1	Fiji	13	22	22	15	12	17	22	19	22	22	186	795
2	United States	19	19	19	19	22	15	17	15	17	15	177	447
3	New Zealand	22	15	17	22	17	13	12	12	13	19	162	761
4	South Africa	12	17	15	13	10	22	10	22	10	17	148	582
5	England (Note: By agreement between the three unions on the island of Great Britain (England, Scotland, Wales), England, as highest finisher among those nations in the 2017–18 series, represented Great Britain in qualifying for the 2020 Olympic Sevens. The final make-up of the Great Britain men's team was determined by the British Olympic Association.)	17	13	8	17	13	12	10	17	2	5	114	384
6	Samoa	8	7	12	3	19	10	15	13	8	12	107	–1
7	Australia	15	10	10	12	10	8	5	10	19	5	104	281
8	France	7	5	2	10	1	19	19	8	15	13	99	–16
9	Argentina	10	8	5	8	15	10	13	10	5	10	94	83
10	Scotland	10	10	13	1	8	5	8	7	7	3	72	–113
11	Canada	5	5	10	5	3	7	1	5	10	8	59	141
12	Spain	5	12	5	10	7	3	3	2	1	1	49	–512
13	Kenya	1	3	7	1	5	1	5	3	1	10	37	–508
14	Wales	3	2	1	5	2	5	2	5	5	1	31	–441
15	Japan	2	1	1	7	1	2	7	1	3	2	27	–898
16	Ireland	—	—	—	—	—	—	—	—	12	7	19	–37
17	Chile	—	—	—	—	5	1	—	—	—	—	6	–141
18	Tonga	—	—	3	2	—	—	—	—	—	—	5	–133
19	Zimbabwe	1	1	—	—	—	—	—	—	—	—	2	–165
20	Portugal	—	—	—	—	—	—	1	—	—	—	1	–67
21	Hong Kong	—	—	—	—	—	—	—	1	—	—	1	–120

Source: World Rugby

Legend
Event Medalists
Gold	Event Champions
Silver	Event Runner-ups
Bronze	Event Third place finishers
Qualification for the 2019–20 World Rugby Sevens Series
No colour	Core team in 2018–19 and re-qualified as a core team for the 2019–20 World Rugby Sevens Series
Pink	Relegated as the lowest placed core team at the end of the 2018–19 season
Yellow	Not a core team
Qualification for the 2020 Olympic Sevens
Automatically qualified (host country Japan)
Qualified to the 2020 Olympic Sevens as one of the four highest placed eligible teams from the 2018–19 series.

== Placings summary ==
Tallies of top four tournament placings during the 2018–19 series, by team:

Team	(gold) Gold	(silver) Silver	(bronze) Bronze	Fourth	Total
Fiji	5	1	1	1	8
New Zealand	2	1	2	1	6
South Africa	2	–	2	1	5
United States	1	4	2	3	10
France	–	2	–	1	3
Australia	–	1	–	1	2
Samoa	–	1	–	1	2
England	–	–	3	–	3
Argentina	–	–	–	1	1
Totals	10	10	10	10	40

== Players ==
=== Scoring leaders ===
Tries scored
Rank	Player	Tries
1	Carlin Isles	52
2	Aminiasi Tuimaba	46
3	Dan Norton	39
3	Max McFarland	39
5	Alasio Naduva	37

Points scored
Rank	Player	Points
1	Andrew Knewstubb	307
2	Madison Hughes	299
3	Carlin Isles	260
4	Nathan Hirayama	254
5	Jean-Pascal Barraque	244

Updated: 2 June 2019

=== Dream Team ===
Forwards	Backs
(United States) Stephen Tomasin (United States) Ben Pinkelman (Fiji) Meli Derenalagi	(United States) Folau Niua (Fiji) Jerry Tuwai (Fiji) Vilimoni Botitu (Fiji) Aminiasi Tuimaba

=== Impact award ===
Impact player awards
Tour Leg	Player	Points
Dubai	Perry Baker; Maurice Longbottom; Ben O'Donnell	44
Cape Town	Alamanda Motuga	47
Hamilton	Vilimoni Botitu	46
Sydney	Joe Perez	40
Las Vegas	Connor Braid	47
Vancouver	Connor Braid	49
Hong Kong	Jeffrey Oluoch	59
Singapore	John Vaili	54
London	Aminiasi Tuimaba	47
Paris	Jean-Pascal Barraque	45

Total impact player points
Pos	Player	T	B	O	C	Total
1	Vilimoni Botitu	119	20	40	138	317
2	Connor Braid	69	21	25	194	309
3	Alamanda Motuga	103	24	24	153	304
4	Ben Pinkelman	75	21	35	168	299
5	Max McFarland	56	37	10	194	297
6	Robbie Fergusson	75	25	28	158	286
7	Stephen Tomasin	89	26	8	151	274
8	Phil Burgess	116	20	14	123	273
9	Dan Norton	73	30	8	151	262
10	Jerry Tuwai	48	30	33	146	257

Updated: 26 May 2019

Coach of the Series: Mike Friday, U.S. head coach

== Tournaments ==
=== Dubai ===
Event	Winners	Score	Finalists	Semifinalists
Cup	New Zealand	21–5	United States	England (Bronze); Australia
5th Place	Fiji	24–19	South Africa	Argentina; Scotland
Challenge Trophy	Samoa	33–24	France	Canada; Spain
13th Place	Wales	31–7	Japan	Kenya; Zimbabwe

=== Cape Town ===
Event	Winners	Score	Finalists	Semifinalists
Cup	Fiji	29–15	United States	South Africa (Bronze); New Zealand
5th Place	England	14–7	Spain	Australia; Scotland
Challenge Trophy	Argentina	38–14	Samoa	Canada; France
13th Place	Kenya	33–26	Wales	Japan; Zimbabwe

=== Hamilton ===
Event	Winners	Score	Finalists	Semifinalists
Cup	Fiji	38–0	United States	New Zealand (Bronze); South Africa
5th Place	Scotland	24–19	Samoa	Australia; Canada
Challenge Trophy	England	36–7	Kenya	Argentina; Spain
13th Place	Tonga	33–10	France	Japan; Wales

=== Sydney ===
Event	Winners	Score	Finalists	Semifinalists
Cup	New Zealand	21–5	United States	England (Bronze); Fiji
5th Place	South Africa	12–10	Australia	France; Spain
Challenge Trophy	Argentina	10–7	Japan	Wales; Canada
13th Place	Samoa	25–5	Tonga	Kenya; Scotland

=== Las Vegas ===
Event	Winners	Score	Finalists	Semifinalists
Cup	United States	27–0	Samoa	New Zealand (Bronze); Argentina
5th Place	England	19–14	Fiji	South Africa; Australia
Challenge Trophy	Scotland	15–14	Spain	Kenya; Chile
13th Place	Canada	21–12	Wales	Japan; France

=== Vancouver ===
Event	Winners	Score	Finalists	Semifinalists
Cup	South Africa	21–12	France	Fiji (Bronze); United States
5th Place	New Zealand	26–19	England	Argentina; Samoa
Challenge Trophy	Australia	35–21	Canada	Wales; Scotland
13th Place	Spain	15–10	Japan	Kenya; Chile

=== Hong Kong ===
Event	Winners	Score	Finalists	Semifinalists
Cup	Fiji	21–7	France	United States (Bronze); Samoa
5th Place	Argentina	21–14	New Zealand	South Africa; England
Challenge Trophy	Scotland	26–24	Japan	Australia; Kenya
13th Place	Spain	19–14 (a.e.t)	Wales	Canada; Portugal
World Series Qualifier	Ireland	28–7	Hong Kong	Germany; Chile

=== Singapore ===
Event	Winners	Score	Finalists	Semifinalists
Cup	South Africa	20–19	Fiji	England (Bronze); United States
5th Place	Samoa	19–17	New Zealand	Australia; Argentina
Challenge Trophy	France	22-19	Scotland	Canada; Wales
13th Place	Kenya	21-5	Spain	Japan; Hong Kong

=== London ===
Event	Winners	Score	Finalists	Semifinalists
Cup	Fiji	43–7	Australia	United States (Bronze); France
5th Place	New Zealand	35–14	Ireland	Canada; South Africa
Challenge Trophy	Samoa	26–17	Scotland	Argentina; Wales
13th Place	Japan	29–14	England	Spain; Kenya

=== Paris ===
Event	Winners	Score	Finalists	Semifinalists
Cup	Fiji	35–24	New Zealand	South Africa (Bronze); United States
5th Place	France	40–5	Samoa	Argentina; Kenya
Challenge Trophy	Canada	28–12	Ireland	Australia; England
13th Place	Scotland	31–26	Japan	Spain; Wales

== See also ==
- 2018–19 World Rugby Women's Sevens Series
- Rugby sevens at the 2020 Summer Olympics – Men's qualification
