= Asaeli Tuivuaka =

Fijian rugby union player (born 1995)

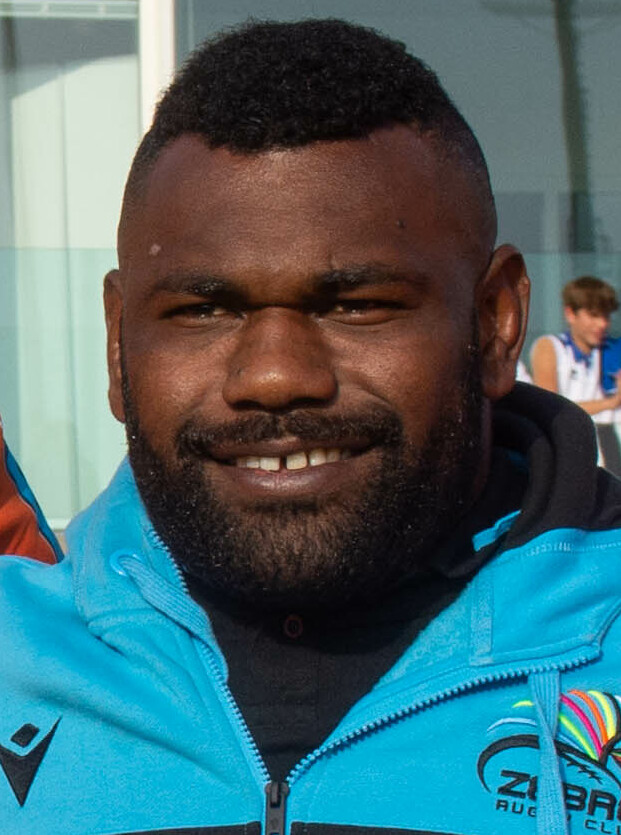
- Tuivuaka in 2021
- Full name: Asaeli Atunaisa Tuivuaka
- Born: 22 December 1995 (age 30)
- Height: 176 cm (5 ft 9 in)
- Weight: 104 kg (229 lb)

Rugby union career
- Position: Wing/Centre
Amateur team(s)
Years	Team	Apps	(Points)
2016–2021	Namosi Rugby		
Senior career
Years	Team	Apps	(Points)
2017	Fijian Drua	2	(0)
2021	NHRU Wildfires	7	(5)
2021–2022	Zebre	10	(5)
2022–	Racing 92		
International career
Years	Team	Apps	(Points)
2018	Fiji Warriors	6	(15)
National sevens team
Years	Team		Comps
2019−	Fiji		
Medal record
Men's rugby sevens
Representing Fiji
Olympic Games
Gold medal – first place	2020 Tokyo	Team competition

Asaeli Tuivuaka (born 22 December 1995) is a Fijian rugby union player. His usual position is wing or Centre. He currently plays for French Top14 team Racing 92.

== Personal life ==
His uncle Setefano Cakau captained Fiji in rugby sevens. His brother Mario Senimoli played rugby sevens for Tabadamu Rugby Club in Fiji but died on the pitch in training in 2011.

== Career ==
In 2017 he was named in Fijian Drua squad for Australian National Rugby Championship. He made his senior international debut in 2019. He was named in the victorious Fiji squad for the Rugby sevens at the 2020 Summer Olympics. For 2021–22 United Rugby Championship he signed for Zebre Parma. The next season he signed for Paris-based club Racing 92.
