= Amanaki Nicole =

New Zealand rugby union player

- Born: 8 February 1992 (age 34) Fiji
- Height: 185 cm (6 ft 1 in)
- Weight: 99 kg (218 lb)
- School: Burnside High School

Rugby union career
Provincial / State sides
Years	Team	Apps	(Points)
2020	Southland		
National sevens team
Years	Team		Comps
2018–	New Zealand		
Medal record
Men's rugby sevens
Representing New Zealand
Olympic Games
Silver medal – second place	2020 Tokyo	Team competition
Rugby World Cup Sevens
Silver medal – second place	2022 Cape Town	Team competition

Amanaki Nicole (born 8 February 1992) is a New Zealand rugby union player.

== Personal life ==
Nicole was educated at Burnside High School.

== Career ==
Nicole made his international debut for New Zealand Sevens in 2018. He played for New Zealand at the 2018 Oceania Sevens Championship held in Suva, Fiji, the country of his birth. He was named in the New Zealand squad for the Rugby sevens at the 2020 Summer Olympics.

Nicole was named as a travelling reserve for the All Blacks Sevens squad for the 2022 Commonwealth Games in Birmingham. In September, He was selected for the team again for the Rugby World Cup Sevens in Cape Town. He won a silver medal after his side lost to Fiji in the gold medal final.
