= Jiuta Wainiqolo =

Fijian rugby union player

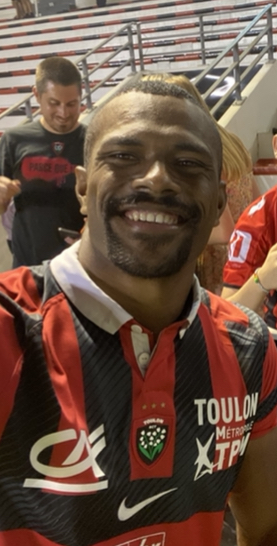
- Wainiqolo in 2022
- Born: Jiuta Naqoli Wainiqolo; 10 March 1999 (age 27)
- Height: 187 cm (6 ft 2 in)
- Weight: 97 kg (15 st 4 lb; 214 lb)
- School: Ratu Kaduvulevu School

Rugby union career
- Position: Wing
- Current team: Lyon OU
Senior career
Years	Team	Apps	(Points)
2021–25	Toulon	86	(185)
2025–	Lyon OU	29	(125)
- Correct as of 31 October 2026
International career
Years	Team	Apps	(Points)
2021–	Fiji	23	(15)
- Correct as of 14 November 2026
National sevens team
Years	Team		Comps
2019–present	Fiji 7s		
Medal record
Representing Fiji
Men's rugby sevens
Summer Olympics
Gold medal – first place	2020 Tokyo	Team competition

Jiuta Naqoli Wainiqolo (born 10 March 1999) is a Fijian rugby union player who currently plays for Lyon Olympique Universitaire (LOU) in the Top 14 competition in France and for the Flying Fijians 15s and 7s teams. During the 2020 Summer Olympics, he was a member of Fiji's Men's Rugby 7s team, which won the gold medal.

== Early life ==
Jiuta Wainiqolo hails from Namara, Vuda, with maternal links to Vatulele in Nadroga-Navosa Province. His father, Nemia Wainiqolo, played fullback in the 1990s for Nausori Rugby Club.

He grew up in the small town of Navua, which is 48 mi (77 km) west of the capital city, Suva. The youngest of 6 siblings, Wainiqolo attended Vashist Muni Primary School and Vashist Muni College, and represented the school's soccer team. He started playing rugby in high school when he attended Ratu Kadavulevu School.

== Before 2016 Olympics ==
When Wainiqolo was 17 years old in Vashist Muni College, he took part in a trial for the national Under 20s soccer team, but later got cut. While watching the national celebration live on TV, he told himself that he "will be the next Olympian" and that it was his dream to one day make it into the Fiji 7s team. In late 2016, his elder brother and his father both requested he focus on rugby, and should therefore attend Ratu Kadavulevu School for 2017.

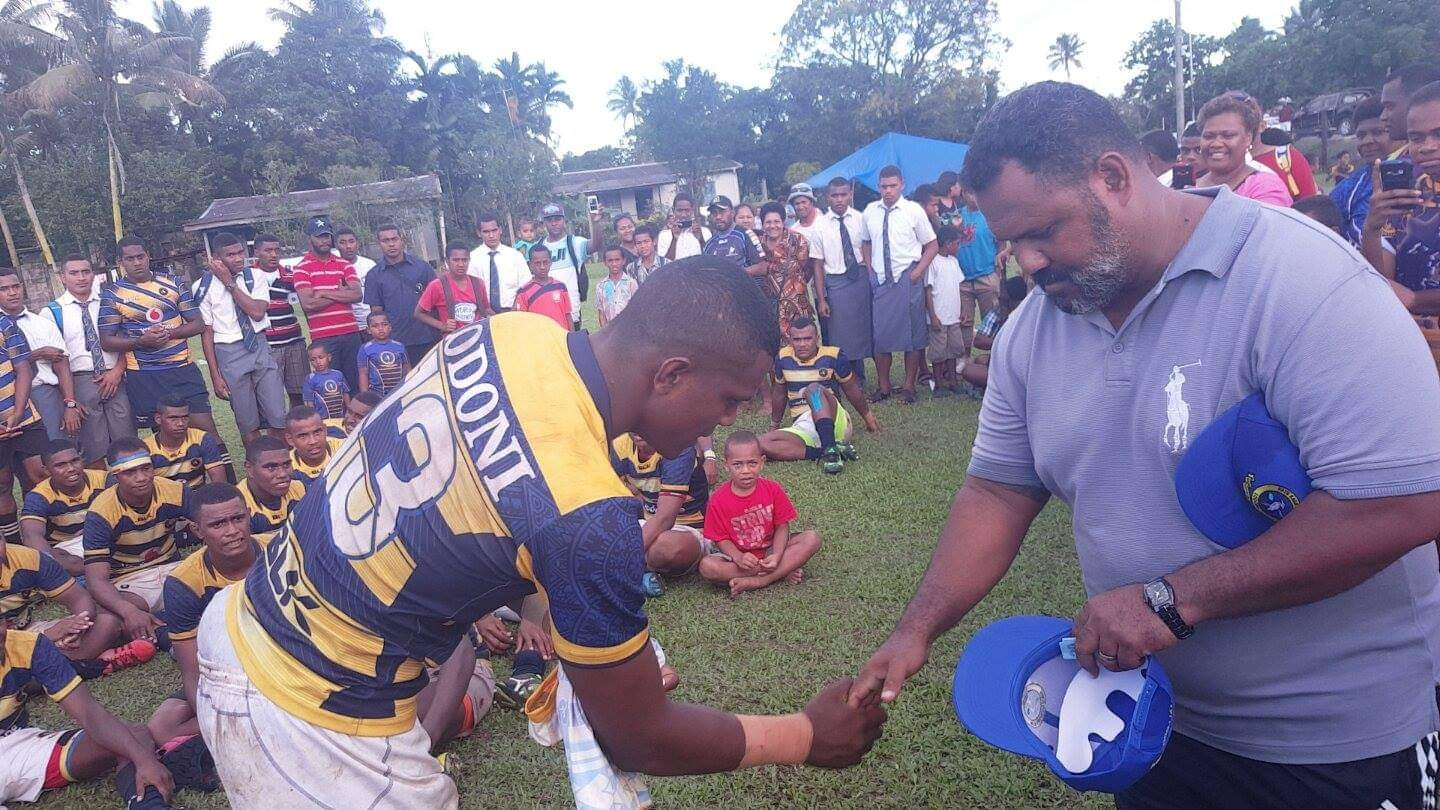
Wainiqolo Award

== After 2016 Olympics ==
=== RKS Rugby Dynasty ===
In 2017, Wainiqolo transferred to Ratu Kadavulevu School (RKS), a boarding school on the coast of the mainland island (about 40 miles northeast of Suva), in the province of Tailevu. At the time, Fiji's historic Men's Rugby 7s gold medal win at the 2016 Rio Olympics was still felt at RKS, a powerhouse rugby school. The atmosphere during the school's rugby season was "like no other", he said in an interview on Rakavi Me I Cavai on 3 July 2020.

His rugby journey in high school began under the coaching of Nacanieli Saumi—the RKS Director of Rugby and Fiji's most successful schoolboys rugby coach—when Wainiqolo was selected into the RKS 7s team that toured Australia. Even though RKS later lost in the semifinals, Wainiqolo still left an impression on Mr Naca Saumi, who described him as "fast, creative, elusive and skillful" because of his soccer background. That tour solidified Wainiqolo to retain a spot for the RKS Under 18 campaign for the 2017 Powerade Rugby Deans Trophy season.

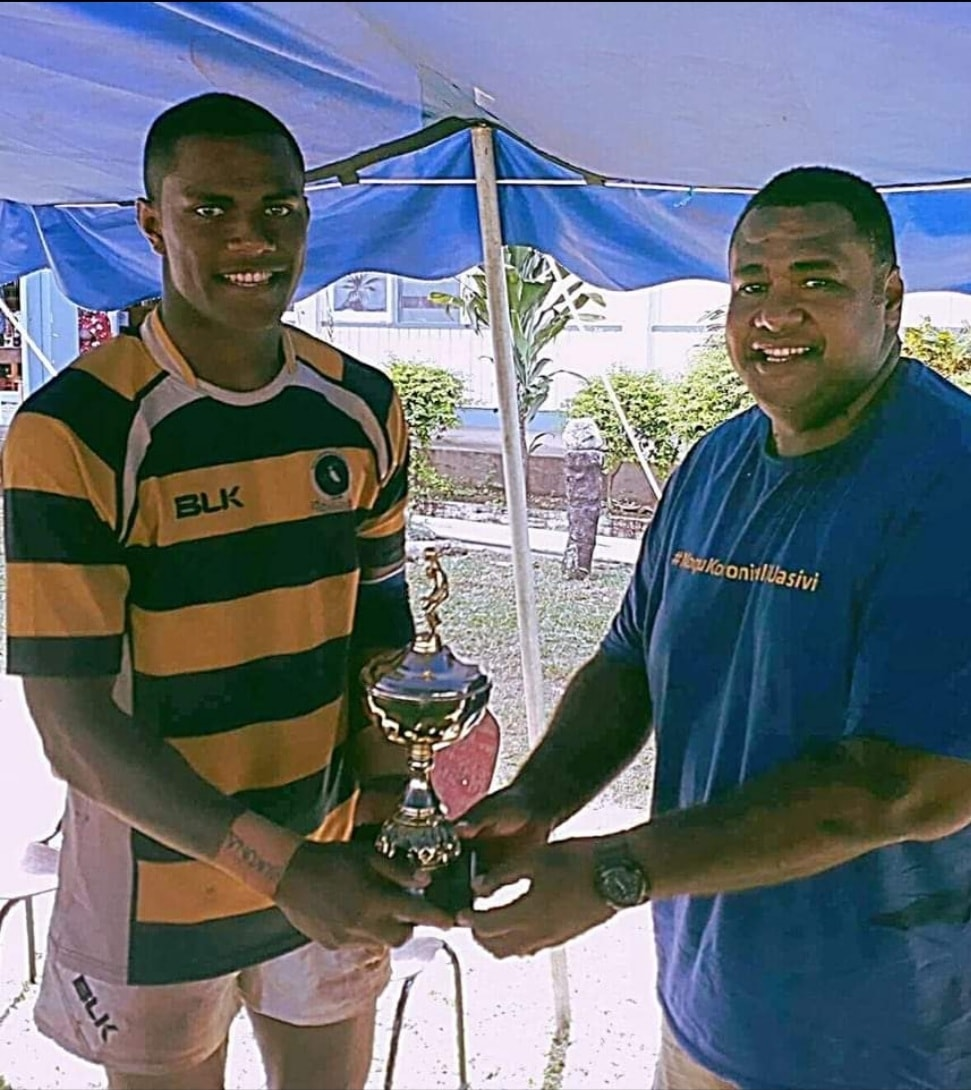
Wainiqolo in 2018 playing for Ratu Kadavulevu School Under 19

His RKS Under 18 team was undefeated from the Eastern Zones and right up to the Deans Trophy finals, and was declared winners during the 2017 Deans rugby competition, beating QVS. Wainiqolo was voted Best Center, and was therefore selected for the Schoolboys Under 18 tour to Australia. That Fiji Schoolboys tour also had current Flying Fijian debutant Simione Kuruvoli and Crusaders winger Leicester Fainga'anuku for the New Zealand Under 18.

Next year, in 2018, Wainiqolo enjoyed further success moving up the ranks as Koli Sewabu called him up for the Under 20s, in which Fiji went on to beat neighbors Samoa in the finals 58–0 in Romania, promoting Fiji back into the Tier 1 Under 20s competition.

=== Rugby League ===
Additional success came in early 2019, when he was offered an NRL contract with Cronulla Sharks for its academy. Wainiqolo quickly stamped his mark in the Under 20s, winning the David Peachy Award, but as the season ended, he was released as his agent and the club could not come to an agreement.

=== Nabua Rugby Club ===
Wainiqolo returned to Fiji, and was advised by his high school coach, Nacanieli Saumi, to join Nabua Rugby Club. After a few matches, he was spotted by a senior Fiji Rugby official and Fijiana coach to the Tokyo Olympics, Saiasi Fuli, who had him join the Suva Rugby Club in which he played his first match against Nadi in the 2019 Skipper Cup season.

=== Fiji Drua ===
Slowly regaining momentum in his rise after the 2019 Skipper Cup season, Wainiqolo was called up by Fiji Drua coach, Senirusi Seruvakula, for the 2019 National Rugby Championship. He made his debut against Sydney Rams in round 4 on 21 September in Churchill Park, Lautoka, but managed his first try against Melbourne Raising in round 6 on 5 October in Casey Fields, Melbourne, scoring a 50-meter try, in which he sliced and slipped through 5 players to touch down under the post. He made about 2 more appearances for the Drua before he got his first call-up for the Flying Fijians match against the Barbarians on 16 November, played at Twickenham, London, England.

=== Fiji 7s ===
Fiji 7s coach Gareth Baber had seen Wainiqolo's progress with the Fiji Drua and the Fiji test match against the Barbarians, but it was only whilst he played in an invitational 7s tournament during the Dubai 7s that Baber closely observed him. Impressed with his performance against the South Africa 7s Academy, which had stars like Cecil Afrika and Werner Kok, coach Baber recruited him into the 7s extended team for the 2019–2020 7s series. Wainiqolo, however, was not able to beat off competition for selection from Aminiasi Tuimaba and Asaeli Tuivuaka for the Hamilton and Sydney 7s tournament. He remained as a non-traveling reserve till the series ended.

Despite not making it into the Fiji 7s team, he showcased his class for the Fiji Warriors in the 2020 World Rugby Pacific Challenge. He was invited for the Pacific Combine, and later got interests from the ACT Brumbies, but was told to spend a season with the Fiji Latui before he could be considered into the Brumbies academy.

== Lead-up to 2020 Olympics ==
Due to the COVID-19 pandemic, the delay of the 2020 Tokyo Olympics forced Baber to lose two of his top players, Vilimone Botitu and Aminiasi Tuimaba, who both took contracts in France. In addition, most of Fiji's rugby activities were put on hold from March–August for nationwide lockdown.

When the 2020 Skipper Cup (the national provincial championship) restarted again in August 2020, Wainiqolo remained focused on playing 7s rugby. The following year, Fiji Rugby Union introduced a "2021 Super Sevens Series", held during January–March to help aid Gareth Baber's Fiji 7s preparations for the Tokyo Olympics in July. The plan for this series was to have 4 tournaments in which the Fiji 7s players would play for their own local clubs in the first two tournaments, with 16 of the best clubs competing, but for the last two tournaments, Gareth Baber would select two Fiji 7s teams. Playing under Fiji 7s captain Jerry Tuwai's LAR Barbarian Brothers club, Wainiqolo built confidence for high-stakes games. Wainiqolo was selected in Gareth Baber's Fiji Shadows for the 45th Fiji Bitter Sapphire Marist 7s, in which he impressed.

After a strong performance in the Marist 7s, Wainiqolo was part of the Fiji team selected for the Oceania 7s on 24 June at North Queensland Stadium, Townsville, Australia, in which Gareth Baber used the tournament to select the final 13 for the Tokyo Olympics. Wainiqolo scored in his first match against Australia, and in his last match against New Zealand in the Oceania finals of round 6.

=== Tokyo Olympics ===
On 4 July, Gareth Baber included Wainiqolo in his 13 men squad to defend the Olympic gold medal in Rugby 7s at the 2020 Tokyo Olympics. Fiji's Men's Rugby 7s team again won the gold medal, defeating New Zealand 27–17 in the finals, with Wainiqolo scoring a try. Wainiqolo was Fiji's top try scorer in the Olympics, with 5 tries.

After returning from the Olympics, Wainiqolo made it official that the French Top 14 club, Toulon, had signed him for a 3-year contract, beginning in the 2021–2022 season.

Wainiqolo left Toulon to join LOU Rugby in Lyon for the 2025–2026 season, signing a three-year contract to take him to Summer 2028.
