= Lee Seong-bae =

South Korean rugby sevens player

- Born: 7 April 1990 (age 36)
- Height: 181 cm (5 ft 11 in)
- Weight: 85 kg (187 lb; 13 st 5 lb)

Rugby union career
- Position: Scrum-half
International career
Years	Team	Apps	(Points)
2016–	South Korea		(0)
National sevens team
Years	Team		Comps
2011–	South Korea		

Lee Seong-bae (born 7 April 1990) is a South Korean rugby sevens player. He competed in the men's tournament at the 2020 Summer Olympics.
