= Joe Schroeder =

American rugby union player

- Born: June 14, 1993 (age 33) Indianapolis, Indiana
- Height: 6 ft 5 in (196 cm)
- Weight: 238 lb (108 kg)

Rugby union career
National sevens team
Years	Team	Comps
2017–present	USA 7s	
- Correct as of 01 August 2021

Joe Schroeder (born 14 June 1993) is an American rugby player who plays for the United States national rugby sevens team on the World Rugby Sevens Series. He debuted for the U.S. national team at the 2017 Dubai Sevens. He missed a chunk of 2018 due to a shoulder injury. He played in the 2019 Pan Am Games and was named in the American squad for the Rugby sevens at the 2020 Summer Olympics.

Schroeder was raised in Indianapolis and attended Cathedral High School. He began playing rugby union at the age of 15 in high school, and also played American football as a defensive end, as well as playing basketball. He competed in cheerleading while he attended Trine University since they did not have a rugby team. He is a devout Roman Catholic.
