= Gareth Baber =

Welsh rugby player and coach (born 1972)

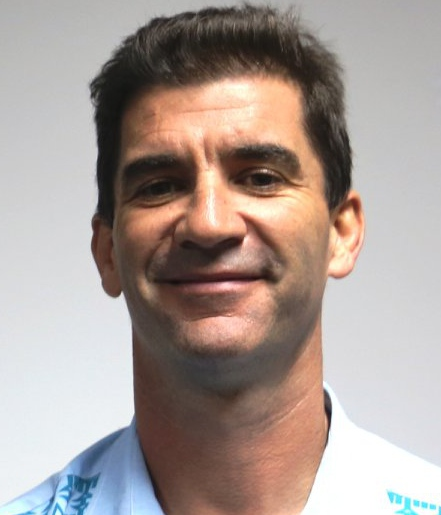
- Baber in 2018
- Born: Gareth Colin Baber; 23 May 1972 (age 54) Cardiff, Wales
- Height: 5 ft 9 in (175 cm)
- Weight: 13.5 st (189 lb; 86 kg)
- University: Swansea University; Oxford University

Rugby union career
- Position: Scrum half
- Current team: Edinburgh
Senior career
Years	Team	Apps	(Points)
–	Cardiff RFC		
–	Pontypridd RFC		
–	Aberavon RFC		
1997-1999	Bristol	33	(55)
- Correct as of 30 June 2014
Provincial / State sides
Years	Team	Apps	(Points)
2003–2007	Dragons	75	(30)
International career
Years	Team	Apps	(Points)
–	Wales 7s		
- Correct as of 30 June 2014
Coaching career
- Years: Team
- 2011–2013: Cardiff Blues
- 2013–2016: Hong Kong 7s
- 2016–2021: Fiji 7s
- 2021–: Edinburgh (assistant coach)
- Correct as of 5 July 2021

Gareth Baber (born 23 May 1972) is a Welsh rugby player and coach. He is best known for coaching and leading the Fiji sevens team to win their second gold medal in rugby sevens at the 2020 Tokyo Olympics. He coached Fiji to their fourth World Sevens Series title. He has won the most tournaments in the world series as coach for the Fiji Islands.

During his playing career Baber earned a Blue for Oxford University's rugby team. He also featured at scrum-half for Pontypridd RFC, and featured prominently in Pontypridd's European Shield victory over London Irish in 2001 where he appeared on the wing.

In July 2023, Baber became a full-time member of staff at Cardiff Metropolitan University as the Director of Rugby System.

== Coaching ==
Baber was assistant coach with the Wales national under-20 team. Baber was also academy skills coach at Welsh regional side Cardiff Blues. In July 2011, Baber and Justin Burnell were appointed Head Coaches of the Cardiff Blues following the resignation of Dai Young.

In November 2013, Baber became head of Hong Kong men's rugby sevens and directed the senior men's, women's and youth programmes at elite level. In October 2016, he signed a four-year contract with Fiji Rugby Union to coach the Fiji national rugby sevens team. Since becoming the Fiji sevens team head coach, he has won eleven tournaments with them, beating the previous record set by Ben Ryan of nine. He also guided Fiji in winning the 2018-19 World Rugby Sevens Series after close a battle for points with the United States throughout the series. He is now an Olympic winner after winning gold in rugby sevens at the Tokyo 2020 Games.
