= Jeff Oluoch =

Kenyan rugby sevens player

Personal information
- Nationality: Kenyan
- Born: 2 April 1995 (age 29)
- Height: 177 cm (5 ft 10 in)
- Weight: 96 kg (212 lb; 15 st 2 lb)

Sport
- Sport: Rugby sevens

Jeff Oluoch (born 2 April 1995) is a Kenyan rugby sevens player. He competed in the men's tournament at the 2020 Summer Olympics. He competed for Kenya at the 2022 Rugby World Cup Sevens in Cape Town.
