= Chihito Matsui =

Japan international rugby union player

Matsui Chihito
- Born: 11 November 1994 (age 32) Osaka, Japan
- Height: 1.83 m (6 ft 0 in)
- Weight: 88 kg (194 lb)
- University: Doshisha University

Rugby union career
- Position: Wing
- Current team: Canon Eagles
Amateur team(s)
Years	Team	Apps	(Points)
- Doshisha University
Senior career
Years	Team	Apps	(Points)
2017–2020	Suntory Sungoliath	7	(30)
2020–	Canon Eagles	39	(110)
- Correct as of 23 June 2021
International career
Years	Team	Apps	(Points)
2015–present	Japan	2	(5)
- Correct as of 3 July 2021
National sevens team
Years	Team		Comps
	Japan 7s		24
- Correct as of 3 July 2021

Chihito Matsui (Japanese: 松井千士, born 11 November 1994) is a Japanese rugby sevens player. He competed in the men's tournament at the 2020 Summer Olympics.
