= Andre Jin Coquillard =

South Korean rugby sevens player (born 1991)

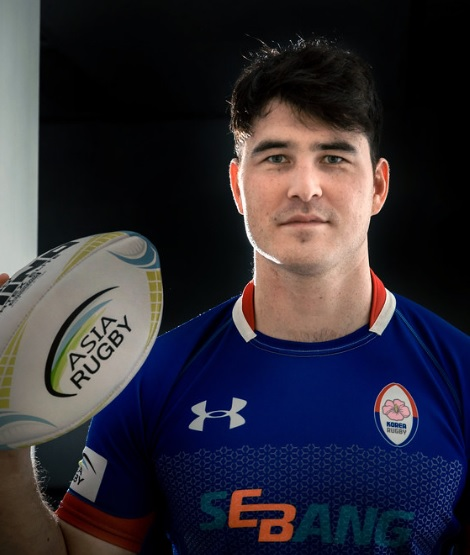
- Full name: Andre Jin Coquillard
- Born: 15 January 1991 (age 35) Seoul, South Korea
- Height: 196 cm (6 ft 5 in)
- Weight: 103 kg (227 lb; 16 st 3 lb)

Rugby union career
- Position(s): Lock, Flanker
Senior career
Years	Team	Apps	(Points)
	NEC Green Rockets		(0)
2018	Seattle Seawolves		(0)
International career
Years	Team	Apps	(Points)
	South Korea		(0)
National sevens team
Years	Team		Comps
2015–	South Korea		
Medal record
Men's rugby sevens
Representing South Korea
Asia Rugby Sevens Series
Gold medal – first place	2017 Qatar	Team competition

Andre Jin Coquillard (born 15 January 1991) is a South Korean rugby union and sevens player He competed in the men's tournament at the 2020 Summer Olympics.

== Early life and career ==
Coquillard was born in Seoul to a European American father and a Korean mother. His mother, Kim Dong-su, was a popular fashion model in the 1980s.

He played for Brentwood College School in Canada in 2008 and 2009 when they won the Provincial Champions titles back-to-back. He also represented the United States U17s team before he joined the University of California, Berkeley and played for the Golden Bears. He became a naturalized Korean citizen in 2017.

In January 2022, he was named Alumnus of the Year at Seoul Foreign School.

== Rugby career ==
Coquillard played club rugby for the San Francisco Golden Gate RFC. He has played for the South Korea national rugby union team. In 2018, he signed with the Seattle Seawolves in the Major League Rugby competition.

He is the first naturalized foreign player on South Korea's national rugby sevens team. He competed for the South Korean sevens team at the delayed 2020 Summer Olympics in Tokyo. In December 2021, he signed with Plum ANC.

== Personal life ==
Coquillard appeared on the South Korean reality show, Physical: 100.

== Arrest and conviction ==
In July 2024, South Korean media reported that Coquillard was under investigation after footage aired by MBC appeared to show him assaulting an ex-girlfriend at her home in Seoul. He was subsequently arrested by police on charges including attempted sexual assault, assault causing injury, and property damage.

A district court found Coquillard guilty in early 2025 of attempted rape, assault causing injury, and property damage, and imposed a custodial sentence. Both the prosecution and the defense appealed the ruling. In May 2025, the appellate court upheld the conviction and sentenced him to two years and six months in prison, along with a 40-hour sexual-violence treatment program.

== Filmography ==
=== Television shows ===
Year	Title	Role	Notes	Ref.
2021	Let's Play Soccer	Cast Member	Season 2	

=== Web shows ===
Year	Title	Role	Notes	Ref.
2024	Physical: 100	Contestant, placed 3rd	Season 2	
