= Sireli Maqala =

Fijian rugby sevens player (born 2000)

- Born: March 21, 2000 (age 26) Fiji
- Height: 1.75 m (5 ft 9 in)

Rugby union career
- Position(s): Centre, Wing, Fullback
Senior career
Years	Team	Apps	(Points)
2021–	Bayonne	53	(85)
International career
Years	Team	Apps	(Points)
2022–	Fiji	9	(5)
National sevens team
Years	Team		Comps
2021–	Fiji		
Medal record
Representing Fiji
Men's rugby sevens
Summer Olympics
Gold medal – first place	2020 Tokyo	Team competition
Commonwealth Games
Silver medal – second place	2022 Birmingham	Team competition

Sireli Maqala (born 20 March 2000) is a Fijian rugby union player. He plays for Bayonne in the French Top 14 and for Fiji.

== Rugby sevens ==
Maqala was selected in the Fijian squad for the 2021 Oceania Sevens Championship, a warm-up tournament prior to the 2020 Summer Olympics. In July 2021, he was named in the Fijian squad for the rugby sevens at the Olympics which would go on to win a gold medal.

Maqala was part of the Fiji sevens team that won a silver medal at the 2022 Commonwealth Games.
