= Josh Coward =

Australian rugby sevens player

- Born: 8 June 1997 (age 29)

Rugby union career
- Position(s): Fly-half, Fullback, Wing
Senior career
Years	Team	Apps	(Points)
2025–	Hokkaido Barbarians	8	(30)
National sevens team
Years	Team		Comps
- Australia
Medal record
Boy's rugby sevens
Representing Australia
Commonwealth Youth Games
Silver medal – second place	2015 Apia	Team competition

Josh Coward (born 8 June 1997) is an Australian rugby sevens player. Coward was a member of the Australian men's rugby seven's squad at the Tokyo 2020 Olympics. The team came third in their pool round and then lost to Fiji 19-nil in the quarterfinal.
