= Nathan Lawson (rugby) =

Australian rugby sevens & rugby league player

- Born: 23 January 1999 (age 27) Caringbah, New South Wales, Australia
- Height: 188 cm (6 ft 2 in)
- Weight: 90 kg (14 st 2 lb)
- School: Newington College

Rugby union career
- Position(s): Flanker, Number 8, Centre
Senior career
Years	Team	Apps	(Points)
2019–2020	Southern Districts	26	(75)
- Correct as of 1 December 2023
National sevens team
Years	Team		Comps
2021–24	Australia		21
- Correct as of 1 December 2023
- Rugby league career

Playing information
- Position: Wing
Club
Years	Team	Pld	T	G	FG	P
2025–26	St. George Illawarra	4	2	0	0	8
- Source: As of 28 June 2025

Nathan Lawson (born 23 January 1999) is an Australian professional rugby league footballer who last played as a winger for the St. George Illawarra Dragons in the National Rugby League, and previously played as a forward for the Australia national rugby union sevens team.

== Rugby union ==
=== International career ===
Lawson attended Newington College, completing Year 12 in 2016. He was a member of the Australian men's rugby seven's squad at the Tokyo 2020 Olympics. He was a last-minute replacement for Henry Paterson who was injured. The team came third in their pool round and then lost to Fiji 19–0 in the quarterfinal. He competed for Australia at the 2022 Rugby World Cup Sevens in Cape Town.

In 2024, He was named in Australia's squad for the Summer Olympics in Paris.

== Rugby league ==
=== St George Illawarra Dragons ===
On 24 December 2024 it was reported that he would join St. George Illawarra Dragons for 2025. Lawson made his NRL debut for the St. George Illawarra Dragons in round 13 of the 2025 NRL season in the Dragons' 20–6 win over the Newcastle Knights, replacing the injured winger Christian Tuipulotu, he made his first-grade debut after joining the St. George Illawarra supplementary list in 2025 and impressing in NSW Cup with standout performances, including a hat-trick against Manly.

On 27 July 2026, St. George Illawarra announced that Lawson was released from his playing contract and would return to union.
