= Etene Nanai-Seturo =

New Zealand rugby union player

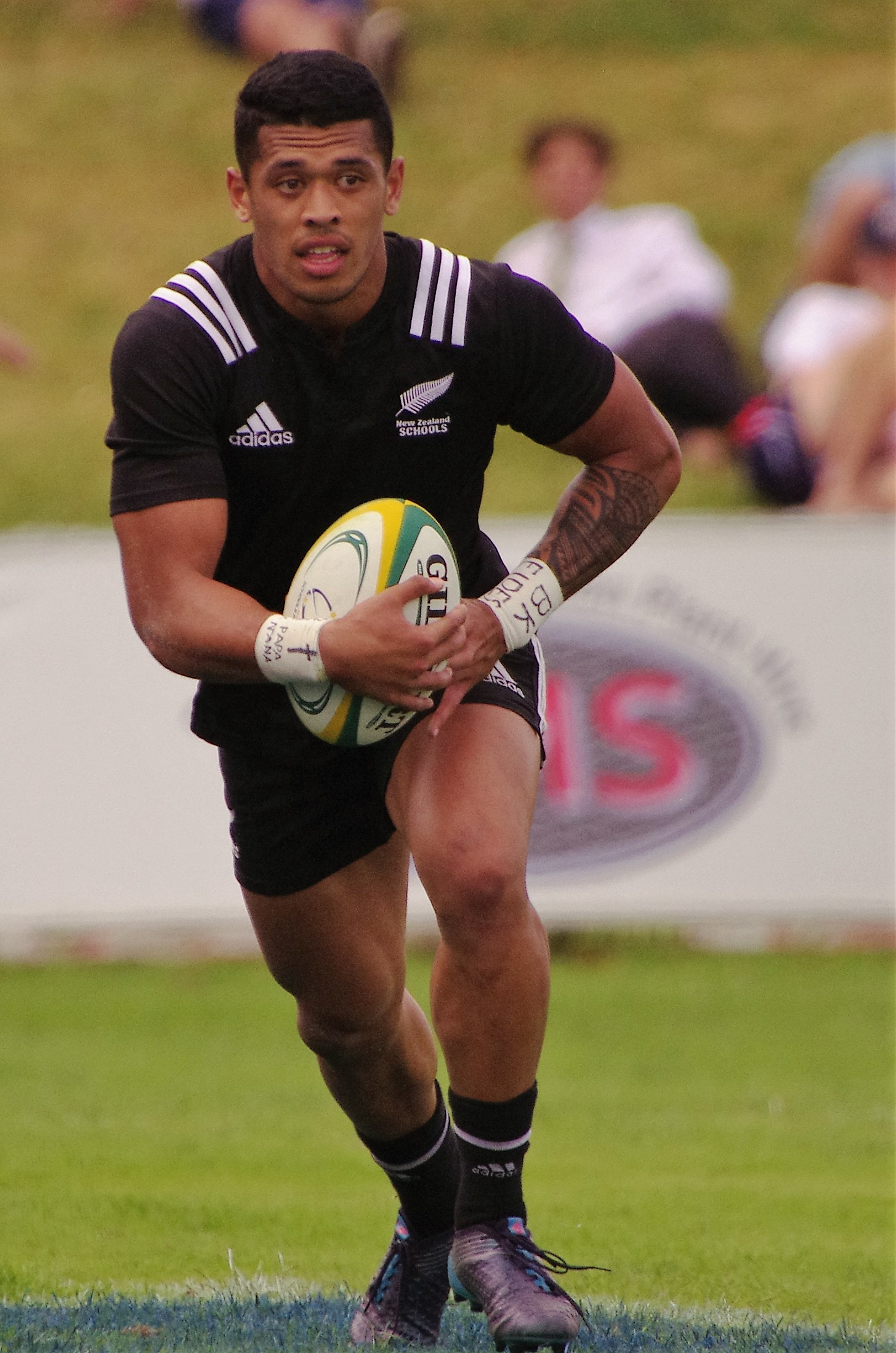
- Nanai-Seturo in 2017
- Born: 20 August 1999 (age 27) Auckland, New Zealand
- Height: 183 cm (6 ft 0 in)
- Weight: 92 kg (203 lb)
- School: Saint Kentigern College

Rugby union career
- Position(s): Wing, Fullback
- Current team: Counties Manukau, Chiefs
Senior career
Years	Team	Apps	(Points)
2018–	Counties Manukau	34	(70)
2019–	Chiefs	64	(105)
- Correct as of 17 August 2025
International career
Years	Team	Apps	(Points)
2019	New Zealand U20	5	(10)
2023	All Blacks XV	1	(5)
- Correct as of 25 February 2024
National sevens team
Years	Team		Comps
2018–	New Zealand		12
- Correct as of 20 June 2020
Medal record
Men's rugby sevens
Representing New Zealand
Olympic Games
Silver medal – second place	2020 Tokyo	Team competition
Commonwealth Games
Gold medal – first place	2018 Gold Coast	Team competition

Etene Nanai-Seturo (born 20 August 1999) is a New Zealand rugby union player.

Nanai-Seturo is a New Zealand born Rugby Union player. He plays fullback. Recently played in the New Zealand Schoolboys side and represented Counties Manukau in the Mitre 10 Cup. He attended Saint Kentigern College where his rugby would stand out for him. He currently plays for New Zealand in the Sevens Tournament, as well as, the Chiefs in the Super Rugby Competition.
