= Foster Horan =

Irish rugby union player

- Born: 3 November 1992 (age 34) Gorey, Ireland
- Height: 1.80 m (5 ft 11 in)
- Weight: 88 kg (194 lb)

Rugby union career
National sevens team
Years	Team	Comps
2018-Present	Ireland 7s	
- Correct as of 1 August 2021

Foster Horan (born 3 November 1992) is an Irish rugby union player who played as a forward for the Ireland national rugby sevens team. He debuted for the Ireland national sevens team at the 2018 London Sevens.

Horan played youth rugby with the Gorey Rugby Club up to the under-12 level, before going to Kilkenny College. Horan played outside centre for the Ireland national under-20 rugby union team at the 2012 IRB Junior World Championship in South Africa, where Ireland finished fifth after wins against South Africa, England, and France.
