= Felipe del Mestre =

Argentine rugby sevens player

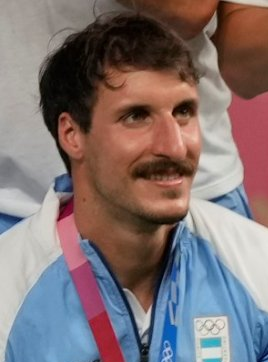
- Del Mestre in 2021
- Born: September 25, 1993 (age 33) Buenos Aires, Argentina
- Height: 1.86 m (6 ft 1 in)
- Weight: 87 kg (192 lb)

Rugby union career
- Position: Fullback
National sevens team
Years	Team	Comps
- Argentina 7s
Medal record
Men's rugby sevens
Representing Argentina
Summer Olympics
Bronze medal – third place	2020 Tokyo	Team competition
Pan American Games
Gold medal – first place	2019 Lima	Team competition

Felipe del Mestre (born 25 September 1993) is an Argentine rugby union player. He plays rugby sevens for Argentina 7s. He has medaled at the 2019 Pan American Games. He was also selected to Argentina squad to compete at the 2020 Summer Olympics in the men's rugby sevens tournament.
