= Ryota Kano =

Japanese rugby sevens player

Kanō Ryōta
- Born: 10 May 1992 (age 34) Katsushika, Tokyo, Japan
- Height: 1.72 m (5 ft 8 in)
- Weight: 72 kg (159 lb)
- University: Meiji University

Rugby union career
- Position(s): Scrum-half, Wing
- Current team: Meiji Yasuda Life Hollies
Senior career
Years	Team	Apps	(Points)
2017–2026	Meiji Yasuda Life Hollies	30	(126)
National sevens team
Years	Team		Comps
	Japan 7s		37
- Correct as of 3 July 2021
Medal record
Men's rugby sevens
Representing Japan
Asian Games
Silver medal – second place	2018 Jakarta–Palembang	Team
Bronze medal – third place	2022 Hangzhou	Team

Ryota Kano (Japanese: 加納 遼大, romanized: Kanō Ryōta, born 10 May 1992) is a Japanese rugby sevens player. He competed in the men's tournament at the 2020 Summer Olympics.
