= Ethan Waddleton =

England rugby union player

- Born: 23 November 1996 (age 29) Ipswich, England
- Height: 1.78 m (5 ft 10 in)
- Weight: 87 kg (192 lb)

Rugby union career
National sevens teams
Years	Team	Comps
2016-	England 7s	
2021-	Great Britain 7s	
- Correct as of 26 July 2021

Ethan Waddleton (born 23 November 1996) is an English rugby union player. He plays for the Great Britain national rugby sevens team having also previously represented the England national rugby sevens team.

== Early life ==
From Ipswich, in Suffolk, Waddleton attended St Joseph's College, Ipswich and played in the same schoolboy side as future England international Lewis Ludlam.

== Career ==
He trained as a youngster with Rugby Premiership clubs Northampton Saints and Saracens, as well as playing for Colchester RFC. He made his debut for the England national rugby sevens team in January 2017, and was part of the team that won bronze at the 2018 Commonwealth Games.

He was named in the Team GB rugby sevens squad for the delayed 2020 Olympic Games held in Tokyo, Japan in 2021. Waddleton competed for England at the 2022 Rugby World Cup Sevens in Cape Town.

He played for GB Sevens in the SVNS series after the formation of the GB programme to run from 2023 onwards, replacing the separate England, Wales, and Scotland programmes. He played as part of the GB sevens team at the men’s Olympic qualification repechage tournament in Monaco in June 2024. He was selected for the Great Britain national rugby sevens team for the 2024-25 SVNS series which began at the Dubai Sevens on 30 November 2024. He scored a try in the opening tournament in a 22-17 victory against Ireland Sevens. He continued with the British rugby sevens team for the 2025-26 SVNS.

== Personal life ==
He lives in Holbrook, Suffolk. In 2022 he took part in The Festival of Suffolk torch relay to celebrate Queen Elizabeth II's Platinum Jubilee in her 70th year as monarch.
