= Ben Harris (rugby union, born 1999) =

English rugby union player

- Full name: Benjamin James Harris
- Born: 8 September 1999 (age 27) England
- Height: 189 cm (6 ft 2 in)
- Weight: 101 kg (223 lb; 15 st 13 lb)
- School: Royal Grammar School, High Wycombe

Rugby union career
- Position: Wing
- Current team: Ealing Trailfinders
Youth career
- London Irish
- –: Saracens
Senior career
Years	Team	Apps	(Points)
2020–2024	Saracens	7	(15)
2024–	Ealing Trailfinders	0	(0)
- Correct as of 20 September 2021
National sevens teams
Years	Team		Comps
2018–	England Sevens		14
2021	Great Britain		1
- Correct as of 20 September 2021

Benjamin James Harris (born 8 September 1999 in England) is an English rugby union player who plays for Ealing Trailfinders in the RFU Championship. His playing position is wing. He was promoted to Saracens' first-team squad ahead of the 2021–22 season. Harris has represented England at rugby sevens since 2017, playing in 14 tournaments. He was named the "England 7's RPA Mens Player of the Year" for the 2019/20 season, making him the youngest player to receive the award. He also competed in the men's tournament at the 2020 Summer Olympics for Great Britain.

On 22 May 2024, it was confirmed that Harris would join Ealing Trailfinders in the RFU Championship from the 2024–25 season.
