= Vincent Onyala =

Kenyan rugby sevens player

- Born: 10 December 1990 (age 35)
- Height: 175 cm (5 ft 9 in)
- Weight: 89 kg (196 lb; 14 st 0 lb)

Rugby union career
National sevens team
Years	Team	Comps
- Kenya

Vincent Onyala (born 10 December 1990) is a Kenyan rugby sevens player. He competed in the men's tournament at the 2020 Summer Olympics.

Onyala was named the most valuable player of the 2019 Kenya National Sevens Circuit. He represented Kenya at the 2022 Rugby World Cup Sevens in Cape Town.

In 2024, He competed for Kenya at the Summer Olympics in Paris.
