= Meli Derenalagi =

Fijian rugby union player (born 1998)

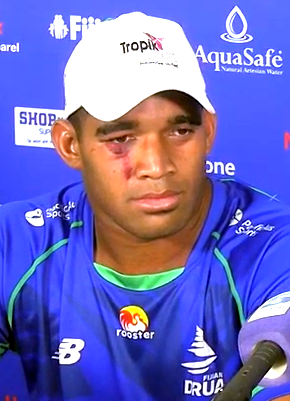
- Derenalagi in 2023
- Full name: Ratu Meli Derenalagi
- Born: 26 November 1998 (age 27) Nadi, Fiji
- Height: 194 cm (6 ft 4 in)
- Weight: 98 kg (216 lb; 15 st 6 lb)
- School: Queen Victoria School

Rugby union career
- Position: Flanker
- Current team: Fijian Drua
Senior career
Years	Team	Apps	(Points)
2022–	Fijian Drua	36	(15)
- Correct as of 10 August 2022
International career
Years	Team	Apps	(Points)
2018	Fiji U20	4	(10)
- Correct as of 10 February 2022
National sevens team
Years	Team		Comps
2018–2021	Fiji		17
- Correct as of 10 February 2022
Medal record
Men's rugby sevens
Representing Fiji
Summer Olympics
Gold medal – first place	2020 Tokyo	Team competition

Ratu Meli Derenalagi (born 26 November 1998) is an Olympic gold medallist and Loose forward in the Fijian Drua team playing in the Super Rugby Pacific. Dume as he is affectionately known, is well known for his offloading ability. He played for the Fiji national rugby sevens team from 2018- 2020 where he won a gold medal at the 2020 Summer Olympics at Tokyo, Japan. His uncles Semisi Naevo, Apenisa Naevo and father Ratu Vuniani Derenalagi have also played for Fiji in rugby sevens. Also was selected for the Flying Fijians at the 2023 Rugby World Cup.

== Career ==
Attended Queen Victoria School in Fiji where played for their U-18 and won the prestigious Deans Trophy in 2016. Represented Fiji in the age-grade teams (U-18, U-20's) before being selected for the national 7's team and making his debut in 2018-2019 SVNS.

He won the rookie of the year in 2019. He captained the Fiji 7s side to their first Sydney Sevens title in 2020 with a thrilling 12–10 win over South Africa in the final.

He was selected to Fijian squad to compete at the 2020 Summer Olympics in the men's rugby sevens tournament. He was also subsequently part of the Fijian side which claimed gold medal after defeating New Zealand 24–12 at the 2020 Summer Olympics.

Recruited by the Fijian Drua in their inaugural season 2022 in Super Rugby Pacific.
