= Jacob Ojee =

Kenyan rugby union player

- Born: March 7, 1991 (age 35)
- Height: 182 cm (6 ft 0 in)
- Weight: 91 kg (201 lb)

Rugby union career
- Position(s): Wing, Centre
Senior career
Years	Team	Apps	(Points)
	Kenya Commercial Bank RFC		(0)
International career
Years	Team	Apps	(Points)
2015–2018	Kenya		
National sevens team
Years	Team		Comps
2014–?	Kenya 7s		
- Correct as of 01 August 2021

Jacob Omondi Ojee (born 7 March 1991) is a Kenyan rugby union wing who is currently a member of Kenya Commercial Bank RFC and is team captain for the Kenyan national rugby 7s team.

== Early career ==
Ojee began his interest in rugby at 13, and would accompany his older brother to workouts.

== Rugby career ==
=== Sevens ===
Ojee has been a member of the national rugby sevens team since 2014. He was named captain of the rugby sevens team by head coach Paul Murunga on 16 January 2019.

=== XVs ===
Ojee has also appeared in tests for the Kenyan national rugby union team, with his first match coming against Portugal in 2015 and last coming against Namibia in 2018.
