= Johnstone Olindi =

Kenyan rugby sevens player

Personal information
- Nationality: Kenyan
- Born: 4 November 1999 (age 25); Nairobi, Kenya
- Height: 177 cm (5 ft 10 in)
- Weight: 68 kg (150 lb; 10 st 10 lb)

Sport
- Sport: Rugby sevens

Johnstone Olindi is a Kenyan rugby sevens player. He competed in the men's tournament at the 2020 Summer Olympics. He also featured for Kenya at the 2022 Rugby World Cup Sevens in Cape Town.
