= Josh Turner (rugby union) =

Australian rugby sevens player

- Born: 23 September 1995 (age 31) Hamilton, New Zealand
- Height: 1.80 m (5 ft 11 in)
- Weight: 85 kg (187 lb; 13 st 5 lb)

Rugby union career
- Position(s): Wing, Fullback
Senior career
Years	Team	Apps	(Points)
2016–2019	Manly	52	(208)
2016–2017	Sydney	10	(33)
- Correct as of 1 December 2023
National sevens team
Years	Team		Comps
2019–	Australia		30
- Correct as of 1 December 2023

Josh Turner (born 23 September 1995) is a professional rugby union player who plays as a fullback. Born in New Zealand, he represents Australia at international level after qualifying on residency grounds.

== International career ==
Turner was a member of the Australian men's rugby seven's squad at the Tokyo 2020 Olympics. The team came third in their pool round and then lost to Fiji 19-0 in the quarterfinal.

Turner competed for Australia at the 2022 Rugby World Cup Sevens in Cape Town.

In 2024, he was named as a traveling reserve for the Australian sevens team to the Paris Olympics.
