= Phil Berna =

Canadian rugby sevens player

- Full name: Philip Robert James Berna
- Born: April 7, 1996 (age 30) Vancouver, British Columbia, Canada
- Height: 188 cm (6 ft 2 in)
- Weight: 96 kg (212 lb)

Rugby union career
National sevens team
Years	Team	Comps
- Canada
Medal record
Men's rugby sevens
Representing Canada
Pan American Games
Silver medal – second place	2019 Lima	Team
Bronze medal – third place	2023 Santiago	Team

Philip Robert James Berna (born April 7, 1996) is a Canadian rugby sevens player.

== Career ==
Berna won silver as part of Canada's team at the 2019 Pan American Games in Lima. In June 2021, Berna was named to Canada's 2020 Olympic team.

In 2022, He competed for Canada at the 2022 Rugby World Cup Sevens in Cape Town.
