= Daniel Taabu =

Kenyan rugby sevens player

- Born: Daniel Taabu; 19 January 1996 (age 30)
- Height: 1.74 m (5 ft 9 in)
- Weight: 70 kg (154 lb)

Rugby union career
National sevens team
Years	Team	Comps
2018–present	Kenya 7s	

Daniel Taabu (19 January 1996) is a Kenyan rugby sevens player who represents Kenya internationally. He made his Olympic debut representing Kenya at the 2020 Summer Olympics.

== Career ==
He was awarded the Male Player of the Year award for the season 2017/18 by the Stanbic Mwamba club. He was the leading point scorer of the 2019 Singapore Sevens with 57 points in a tournament where Kenya finished at 13th position. During the tournament, he also scored the most number of tries for Kenya with seven. He was named in the Kenyan squad for the men's rugby sevens tournament at the 2020 Summer Olympics.
