= Harry Jones (rugby union, born 1989) =

Canada international rugby union player

- Born: Harry Ainsley Jones; 26 August 1989 (age 37) Vancouver, British Columbia
- Height: 1.85 m (6 ft 1 in)
- Weight: 90 kg (198 lb)

Rugby union career
- Position: Fly half
International career
Years	Team	Apps	(Points)
2012–present	Canada	20	(38)
Medal record
Men's rugby sevens
Representing Canada
Pan American Games
Gold medal – first place	2015 Toronto	Team competition
Silver medal – second place	2019 Lima	Team competition

Harry Ainsley Jones (born 26 August 1989) is a rugby union fly-half who plays for Greater Sydney Rams and Canada. Jones made his debut for Canada in 2012 and was part of the Canada squad at the 2015 Rugby World Cup.

== Career ==
In June 2021, Jones was named to Canada's 2020 Summer Olympics sevens team.
