= Vilimoni Botitu =

Fijian rugby union player (born 1998)

- Born: 15 June 1998 (age 28)
- Height: 179 cm (5 ft 10 in)
- Weight: 93 kg (205 lb; 14 st 9 lb)

Rugby union career
- Position(s): Centre, Fly-half
- Current team: Castres Olympique
Senior career
Years	Team	Apps	(Points)
- Nawaka
2020-	Castres Olympique	68	(70)
- Correct as of 25 January 2024
International career
Years	Team	Apps	(Points)
2021-	Fiji	10	(7)
- Correct as of 25 January 2024
National sevens team
Years	Team		Comps
2018-2021	Fiji 7s		17
Medal record
Men's rugby sevens
Representing Fiji
Olympic Games
Gold medal – first place	2020 Tokyo	Team competition

Vilimoni Botitu (born 15 June 1998) is a Fijian professional rugby union player for Castres Olympique in the French Top 14. He also appears for the Fiji national team.

== Awards ==
- Player of the Final, Cape Town Sevens 2018
- Hamilton Sevens 2019 Dream Team
- Dream team Singapore Sevens 2019
