= Aminiasi Tuimaba =

Fiji rugby sevens player

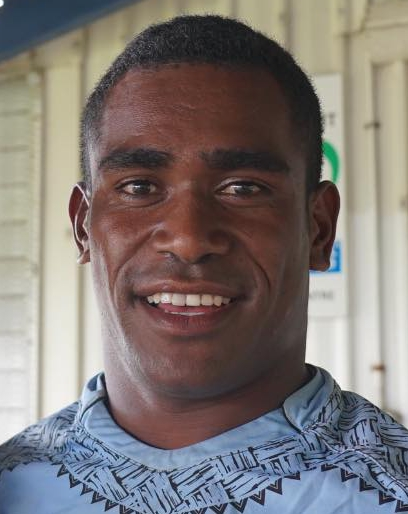
- Tuimaba in 2020
- Born: Aminiasi Tuimaba; 26 March 1995 (age 31)
- Height: 177 cm (5 ft 10 in)
- Weight: 86 kg (190 lb; 13 st 8 lb)

Rugby union career
- Position: Wing
- Current team: Pau
Senior career
Years	Team	Apps	(Points)
2020–	Pau	34	(45)
National sevens team
Years	Team		Comps
2018–present	Fiji		
Medal record
Men's rugby sevens
Representing Fiji
Olympic Games
Gold medal – first place	2020 Tokyo	Team competition
Commonwealth Games
Silver medal – second place	2022 Birmingham	Team competition

Aminiasi Tuimaba (born 26 March 1995) is a Fiji national rugby sevens team player. He plays the wing position. He is known for his speed and try scoring. He finished the 2018/19 season as the top try scorer for the Fiji Sevens team and the 2nd top try scorer in the series, in his rookie season. He is from Yasawa and was a sprinter for Natabua High School. He currently plays in the Top 14 for Pau.

Tuimaba was part of the Fiji sevens team that won a silver medal at the 2022 Commonwealth Games.
