= 2018–19 World Rugby Sevens Series squads =

World Rugby Sevens 2018–19 squads Series XX
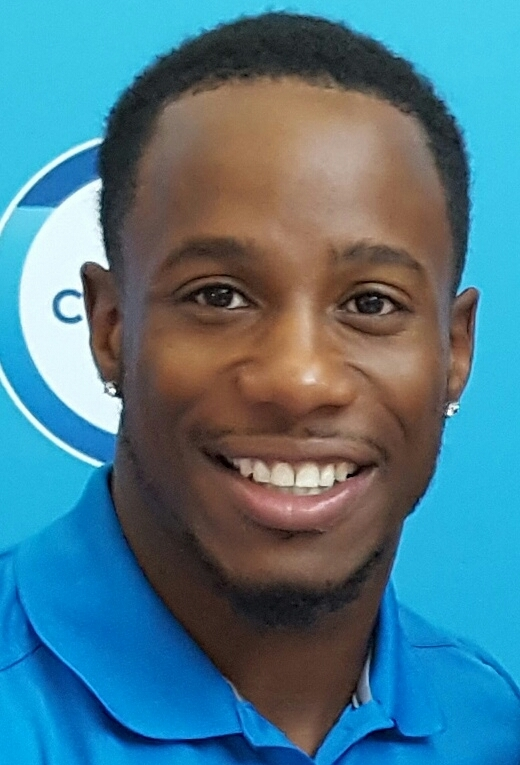
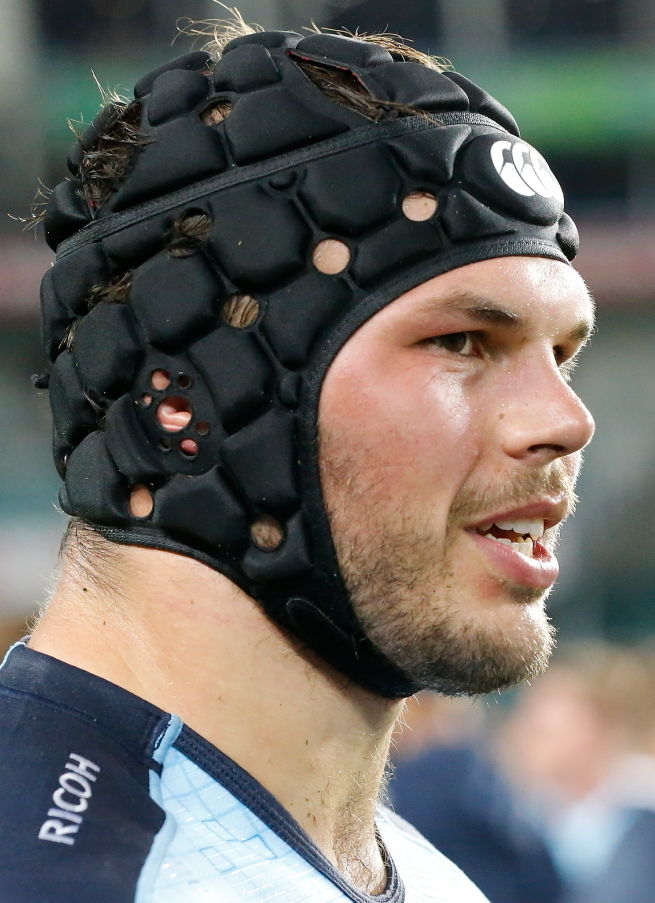
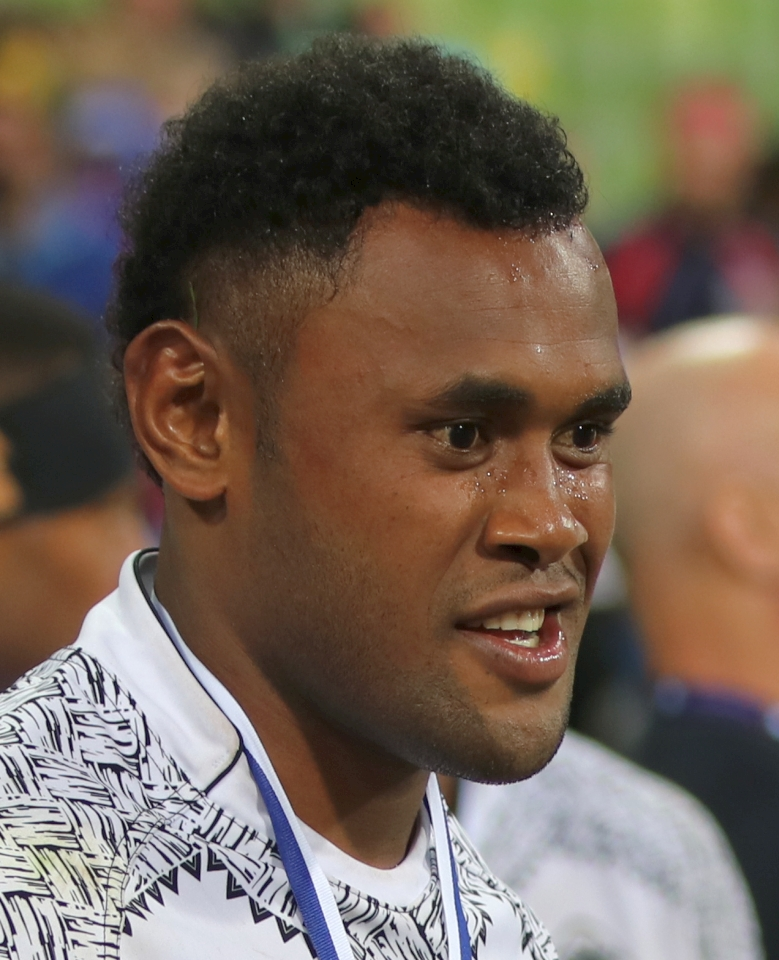
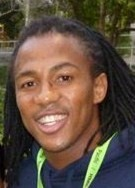
- Players in Series XX. Clockwise from top left: Carlin Isles of the United States, Michael Wells of Australia, Cecil Afrika of South Africa and Amenoni Nasilasila of Fiji.

This is a list of the complete squads for Series XX of World Rugby Sevens for men's teams.

Captains for a tournament have their jersey numbers marked in bold.

== Argentina ==
Coach: Santiago Gómez Cora

Argentina team members 2018–19
Player	Apps	Position	Jersey number by tournament									
Player	Apps	Position	Dubai	Cape Town	Hamilton	Sydney	Las Vegas	Vancouver	Hong Kong	Singapore	London	Paris
Santiago Álvarez	9	Forward	6	6	6	6	**6**	**6**	**6**	**6**	**6**	–
Renzo Barbier	9	Back	1	13	13	2	2	2	–	1	2	2
Lautaro Bazan Velez	10	Back	7	7	7	7	7	7	7	7	7	7
Mateo Carreras	4	Back	10	10	10	10	–	–	–	–	–	–
Joaquin de la Vega	2		–	–	–	–	9	9	–	–	–	–
Felipe Del Mestre	2		–	–	–	–	–	–	–	–	10	6
Lucio Cinti Luna	4	Forward	9	9	9	9	–	–	–	–	–	–
Franco Florio	2		–	–	–	–	13	13	–	–	–	–
Rodrigo Etchart	4	Back	–	–	5	5	5	5	–	–	–	–
Luciano Gonzalez	10	Back	11	11	11	11	11	11	11	11	11	11
Fernando Luna	8	Back	–	–	1	1	1	1	1	13	1	1
Santiago Mare	9	Forward	5	5	2	4	10	10	10	10	–	10
Ignacio Mendy	2	Back	13	1	–	–	–	–	–	–	–	–
Marcos Moneta	2		–	–	–	–	–	–	13	4	–	–
Marcos Moroni	4	Forward	4	4	4	13	–	–	–	–	–	–
Matías Osadczuk	4		–	–	–	–	–	–	9	9	9	9
Maximo Provenzano	4		–	–	–	–	4	4	–	–	13	13
Gastón Revol	8	Back	**8**	**8**	**8**	**8**	–	–	8	8	8	**8**
Conrado Roura	2	Forward	3	3	–	–	–	–	–	–	–	–
Franco Sábato	10	Back	12	12	12	12	12	12	12	12	12	12
Germán Schulz	10	Back	2	2	3	3	3	3	3	3	3	3
Agustin Segura	2		–	–	–	–	–	–	2	2	–	–
Francisco Ulloa	5		–	–	–	–	8	8	4	–	4	4
Tomas Vanni	4		–	–	–	–	–	–	5	5	5	5

== Australia ==
Coach: Tim Walsh

Australia team members 2018–19
Player	Apps	Position	Jersey number by tournament									
Player	Apps	Position	Dubai	Cape Town	Hamilton	Sydney	Las Vegas	Vancouver	Hong Kong	Singapore	London	Paris
Lachie Anderson	6	Forward	12	12	12	12	–	–	–	–	12	12
Tim Anstee	3	Forward	7	–	–	–	–	–	8	8	–	–
Tom Connor	3	Forward	–	7	–	–	13	–	–	10	–	–
Josh Coward	5	Back	–	–	9	9	–	–	–	5	9	9
Rodney Davies	1	Back	–	–	–	–	–	11	–	–	–	–
Lewis Holland	10	Back	**4**	**4**	**4**	**4**	**4**	**4**	**4**	**4**	**4**	**4**
Matt Hood	3	Back	–	–	–	–	11	–	–	–	10	10
Henry Hutchison	10	Back	1	1	1	1	1	1	1	1	1	1
Simon Kennewell	8	Back	–	–	2	2	2	2	2	2	2	2
Boyd Killingworth	2	Forward	9	9	–	–	–	–	–	–	–	–
Maurice Longbottom	8	Back	11	11	11	11	–	–	11	11	11	11
Will Maddocks	1	Back	–	–	–	–	–	–	–	–	–	13
Nick Malouf	7	Back	10	10	10	10	10	10	**10**	–	–	–
Liam McNamara	6	Back	2	2	–	–	12	12	12	12	–	–
Lachie Miller	4	Back	–	–	–	–	–	–	6	6	6	6
Sam Myers	2	Forward	–	–	3	–	–	–	–	–	3	–
Ben O'Donnell	9	Back	5	5	5	5	5	5	5	–	5	5
Jesse Parahi	6	Forward	8	8	–	8	8	8	–	–	8	–
Dylan Pietsch	3	Forward	–	–	–	–	–	13	3	3	–	–
Joe Pincus	4	Back	–	–	–	–	–	–	7	7	7	7
John Porch	6	Back	6	6	6	6	6	6	–	–	–	–
Brandon Quinn	8	Back	13	13	7	13	7	7	13	13	–	–
Jeral Skelton	8	Forward	–	–	8	7	9	9	9	9	13	8
Michael Wells	6	Forward	3	3	13	3	3	3	–	–	–	–
Henry Vanderglas	1	Forward	–	–	–	–	–	–	–	–	–	3

== Canada ==
Coach:

- Damian McGrath (the first eight tournaments, concluding at Singapore)
- Henry Paul (interim)

Canada team members 2018–19
Player	Apps	Position	Jersey number by tournament									
Player	Apps	Position	Dubai	Cape Town	Hamilton	Sydney	Las Vegas	Vancouver	Hong Kong	Singapore	London	Paris
Phil Berna	8	Forward	–	–	4	4	4	4	4	4	4	4
Connor Braid	9	Back	6	6	6	6	6	6	6	6	6	–
Admir Cejvanovic	8	Back	13	2	–	–	2	2	2	2	2	2
Cooper Coats	3		–	13	–	–	13	–	–	–	–	8
Andrew Coe	6	Forward	4	4	–	–	–	–	10	10	13	6
Cole Davis	2	Back	–	–	2	2	–	–	–	–	–	–
Justin Douglas	6	Back	8	8	8	–	–	–	8	8	8	–
Mike Fuailefau	8	Forward	–	–	3	3	3	3	3	3	3	3
Lucas Hammond	1	Back	7	–	–	–	–	–	–	–	–	–
Nathan Hirayama	10	Back	**9**	**9**	**9**	**9**	**9**	**9**	9	9	9	9
Harry Jones	5	Forward	–	–	–	–	11	11	**11**	**11**	**11**	**11**
Isaac Kaay	10	Forward	12	12	12	12	8	8	12	12	10	10
Pat Kay	5	Back	10	10	10	10	–	10	–	–	–	–
Luke McCloskey	10	Back	5	5	5	5	5	5	5	5	5	5
Josiah Morra	7	Forward	3	3	13	13	10	13	–	–	–	13
Matt Mullins	10	Back	1	1	1	1	1	1	1	1	1	1
David Richard	2		–	–	–	–	–	–	13	13	–	–
Jake Thiel	10	Forward	2	7	7	7	7	7	7	7	7	7
Brock Webster	1		–	–	–	8	–	–	–	–	–	–
Adam Zaruba	8	Forward	11	11	11	11	12	12	–	–	12	12

== England ==
Coach: Simon Amor

England team members 2018–19
Player	Apps	Position	Jersey number by tournament									
Player	Apps	Position	Dubai	Cape Town	Hamilton	Sydney	Las Vegas	Vancouver	Hong Kong	Singapore	London	Paris
Jamie Barden	7		–	–	–	13	12	13	6	7	7	**6**
Api Bavadra	1		–	–	–	–	–	–	–	–	–	3
Dan Bibby	7	Back	7	7	7	7	7	7	7	–	–	–
Tom Bowen	9	Back	8	8	8	8	8	8	8	8	8	–
Phil Burgess	9	Forward	3	3	3	3	3	3	**3**	3	**3**	–
Chris Cook	1		–	–	–	–	–	–	–	–	–	7
Max Coyle	1		–	–	–	–	–	–	–	–	–	10
Alex Davis	3	Back	10	10	10	–	–	–	–	–	–	–
Richard de Carpentier	8	Forward	13	–	1	1	1	1	1	1	1	–
George de Cothi	1		–	–	–	–	–	–	–	–	–	11
William Edwards	6	Back	–	–	–	9	9	9	9	9	6	–
Mike Ellery	4	Forward	2	2	–	–	–	–	2	2	–	–
Tom Emery	1		–	–	–	–	–	–	–	–	11	–
Harry Glover	7	Back	12	12	–	12	–	12	12	12	–	2
Fergus Guiry	1		–	–	–	–	–	–	–	–	–	8
Ben Harris	3		–	–	–	–	13	–	–	–	12	12
Ollie Hassell-Collins	1		–	–	–	–	–	–	–	–	–	1
Will Hendy	1		–	–	–	–	–	–	–	–	–	13
Charlton Kerr	9	Forward	1	1	2	5	5	5	5	5	2	–
Ollie Lindsay-Hague	3	Back	9	–	9	–	–	–	–	–	9	–
Tom Mitchell	8	Back	**6**	**6**	**6**	**6**	**6**	**6**	13	**6**	–	–
Will Muir	8	Back	5	5	12	2	2	2	11	11	–	–
Dan Norton	9	Back	4	4	4	4	4	4	4	4	4	–
Ryan Olowofela	8	Back	–	9	5	10	10	10	10	10	10	–
James Rodwell	4	Forward	–	13	13	–	–	–	–	–	5	5
Fomi Sofolarin	3		–	–	–	–	–	–	–	13	13	4
Ethan Waddleton	6	Forward	11	11	11	11	11	11	–	–	–	–
Calum Waters	1		–	–	–	–	–	–	–	–	–	9

== Fiji ==
Coach: Gareth Baber

Fiji team members 2018–19
Player	Apps	Position	Jersey number by tournament									
Player	Apps	Position	Dubai	Cape Town	Hamilton	Sydney	Las Vegas	Vancouver	Hong Kong	Singapore	London	Paris
Napolioni Bolaca	2	Back	–	–	–	–	–	–	–	12	–	12
Vilimoni Botitu	10	Back	7	7	7	7	7	7	7	7	7	7
Apenisa Cakaubalavu	8	Forward	5	5	13	13	–	–	5	5	5	5
Meli Derenalagi	10	Forward	13	6	6	6	6	6	6	6	6	6
Paula Dranisinukula	8	Forward	–	–	4	4	4	4	**4**	**4**	**4**	**4**
Livai Ikanikoda	3	Back	–	–	–	–	–	–	8	8	12	–
Mesulame Kunavula	6	Forward	2	2	5	5	5	5	–	–	–	–
Sevuloni Mocenacagi	10	Back	1	1	1	1	13	1	1	1	1	1
Waisea Nacuqu	7	Back	8	8	8	8	8	–	–	–	8	8
Alasio Naduva	10	Back	10	10	10	10	10	10	10	10	10	10
Amenoni Nasilasila	2	Back	6	13	–	–	–	–	–	–	–	–
Kalione Nasoko	6	Forward	**3**	**3**	**3**	**3**	**3**	**3**	–	–	–	–
Vatemo Ravouvou	2	Back	12	12	–	–	–	–	–	–	–	–
Isoa Tabu	6	Forward	–	–	–	–	1	13	3	3	13	13
Aminiasi Tuimaba	10	Back	11	11	11	11	11	11	11	11	11	11
Asaeli Tuivuaka	5	Forward	–	–	–	–	–	8	13	13	3	3
Jerry Tuwai	10	Back	9	9	9	9	9	9	9	9	9	9
Josua Vakurunabili	8	Forward	–	–	2	2	2	2	2	2	2	2
Terio Veilawa	5	Back	–	–	12	12	12	12	12	–	–	–
Beni Vota	2	Back	4	4	–	–	–	–	–	–	–	–

== France ==
Coach: Jérôme Daret

France team members 2018–19
Player	Apps	Position	Jersey number by tournament									
Player	Apps	Position	Dubai	Cape Town	Hamilton	Sydney	Las Vegas	Vancouver	Hong Kong	Singapore	London	Paris
Esteban Abadie	1		–	–	–	13	–	–	–	–	–	–
Samuel Alerte	9	Forward	11	11	3	–	13	6	1	13	11	11
Jean-Pascal Barraque	8	Back	10	10	–	–	10	**10**	**10**	**10**	**10**	**10**
Julien Blanc	2		–	–	–	–	–	–	4	4	–	–
Kevin Bly	1	Back	7	–	–	–	–	–	–	–	–	–
Paul Bonnefond	7	Back	9	9	–	–	9	13	13	9	9	9
Pierre Boudehent	2	Forward	–	–	8	8	–	–	–	–	–	–
Terry Bouhraoua	5	Back	**4**	**4**	4	–	–	–	–	–	4	4
Aurelien Callendret	2		–	–	–	–	–	–	12	12	–	–
Manoël Dall'igna	6	Forward	–	–	**2**	**2**	–	–	2	2	2	2
Sadek Deghmache	2		–	–	–	–	12	12	–	–	–	–
Nisie Huyard	4	Back	2	2	9	9	–	–	–	–	–	–
William Iraguha	1		–	–	–	–	–	–	–	5	–	–
Jean-Teiva Jacquelain	1		–	–	–	–	–	–	–	–	–	7
Pierre Gilles Lakafia	5	Forward	8	–	–	–	8	8	–	–	8	8
Jonathan Laugel	8	Forward	1	1	1	1	1	1	–	–	1	1
Thibauld Mazzoleni	8	Back	12	12	12	12	4	4	–	–	13	6
Pierre Mignot	5	Forward	–	3	–	3	3	3	9	–	–	–
Gabriel N'Gandebe	2	Back	–	–	11	11	–	–	–	–	–	–
Marvin O'Connor	10	Back	13	8	13	4	2	2	8	8	12	12
Stephen Parez	9	Back	5	5	5	5	5	5	5	–	5	5
Callum Randle	1		–	7	–	–	–	–	–	–	–	–
Paulin Riva	7	Back	6	6	6	6	**6**	–	–	–	6	13
Remi Siega	7		–	–	7	7	7	7	7	7	7	–
Joachim Trouabal	1		–	13	–	–	–	–	–	–	–	–
Sacha Valleau	2	Forward	–	–	–	–	–	–	–	1	–	3
Tavite Veredamu	4	Forward	3	–	–	–	–	–	3	3	3	
Gabin Villière	3	Back	–	–	–	–	–	9	6	6	–	–
Jimmy Yobo	2		–	–	10	10	–	–	–	–	–	–
Antoine Zeghdar	4		–	–	–	–	11	11	11	11	–	–

== Japan ==
Coach: Kensuke Iwabuchi

Japan team members 2018–19
Player	Apps	Position	Jersey number by tournament									
Player	Apps	Position	Dubai	Cape Town	Hamilton	Sydney	Las Vegas	Vancouver	Hong Kong	Singapore	London	Paris
Kentaro Fujii	1		10	–	–	–	–	–	–	–	–	–
Ryo Fujii	4		2	2	13	3	–	–	–	–	–	–
Yoshikazu Fujita	6	Back	–	–	–	–	9	1	9	9	9	9
Shohei Fukumoto	4		3	3	3	13	–	–	–	–	–	–
Teruya Goto	3	Back	–	–	–	–	13	2	8	–	–	–
Kazuhiro Goya	2	Back	–	–	–	–	10	10	–	–	–	–
Kazushi Hano	4	Back	–	–	–	–	–	–	4	4	4	4
Kosuke Hashino	6		–	10	10	10	–	–	10	10	10	10
Taisei Hayashi	9	Forward	11	11	11	11	11	11	11	11	11	–
Kippei Ishida	2		–	–	–	–	3	3	–	–	–	–
Ryota Kano	1		–	–	–	–	–	–	–	–	–	11
Masaki Kondo	2		9	9	–	–	–	–	–	–	–	–
Taiki Koyama	2		–	–	–	–	7	7	–	–	–	–
Siosifa Lisala	5		–	–	1	1	1	–	3	3	–	–
Chihito Matsui	2		–	–	–	–	–	–	–	–	8	8
Shinya Morita	2	Back	1	1	–	–	–	–	–	–	–	–
Naoki Motomura	10	Back	12	12	12	12	12	12	12	12	12	12
Takehiro Nakazawa	8		4	4	4	4	4	4	–	–	13	3
Yoshihiro Noguchi	8	Back	8	8	8	8	8	8	–	8	–	13
Rikiya Oishi	5	Forward	–	–	2	2	2	13	–	13	–	–
Yu Okudaira	1		–	13	–	–	–	–	–	–	–	–
Dai Ozawa	10	Forward	**6**	**6**	**6**	**6**	**6**	**6**	**6**	**6**	**6**	**6**
Katsuyuki Sakai	8	Back	7	7	7	7	–	–	7	7	7	7
Kameli Soejima	8	Forward	–	–	5	5	**5**	**5**	**5**	**5**	**5**	**5**
Michael Toloke	5		13	–	–	–	–	–	1	1	1	1
Harunori Tsuruya	2	Forward	5	5	–	–	–	–	–	–	–	–
Lote Tuqiri	4	Forward	–	–	–	–	–	–	2	2	2	2
Toshiki Yamauchi	1		–	–	–	–	–	–	–	–	3	–
Ryuta Yasui	1		–	–	–	–	–	–	13	–	–	–
Taichi Yoshizawa	3	Back	–	–	9	9	–	9	–	–	–	–

== Kenya ==
Coach: Erick Ogweno

Kenya team members 2018–19
Player	Apps	Position	Jersey number by tournament									
Player	Apps	Position	Dubai	Cape Town	Hamilton	Sydney	Las Vegas	Vancouver	Hong Kong	Singapore	London	Paris
Eden Agero	5	Forward	**7**	**7**	–	–	–	–	7	7	–	13
Mike Agevi	2		–	–	–	–	2	2	–	–	–	–
Andrew Amonde	4	Forward	–	–	–	–	–	–	8	8	8	8
Harold Anduvate	2		–	–	8	8	–	–	–	–	–	–
Edmund Anya	2		–	–	–	–	12	12	–	–	–	–
Oscar Dennis	3		–	–	–	–	–	–	11	11	13	–
Herman Humwa	5	Back	8	8	–	–	8	8	–	–	–	2
Cyprian Kuto	8	Back	13	4	5	5	5	6	–	–	12	12
Lugonzo Ligamy	2	Back	–	–	–	–	–	–	4	4	–	–
Samuel Motari	2	Back	2	2	–	–	–	–	–	–	–	–
Leonard Mugasi	2	Back	11	11	–	–	–	–	–	–	–	–
Shaddon Munoko	3		–	–	–	–	–	7	13	13	–	–
Bush Mwale	8	Forward	–	–	6	6	6	5	3	3	3	3
Eliakim Mwasawa	2		–	–	13	2	–	–	–	–	–	–
Jacob Ojee	6		–	–	**11**	**11**	**11**	**11**	–	–	**11**	**11**
Johnstone Olindi	10	Back	10	10	10	10	13	10	10	10	10	10
Jeffrey Oluoch	5	Forward	6	–	–	–	–	–	**6**	**6**	**6**	**6**
Dennis Ombachi	2	Forward	12	12	–	–	–	–	–	–	–	–
Erick Ombasa	2	Back	4	13	–	–	–	–	–	–	–	–
Charles Omondi	6		5	5	–	–	3	3	–	–	5	5
Vincent Onyala	9		–	6	3	3	1	4	5	5	4	4
Alvin Otenio	2	Back	3	3	–	–	–	–	–	–	–	–
Nelson Oyoo	4		–	–	–	–	–	–	9	9	9	9
William Reeve	2		–	–	2	13	–	–	–	–	–	–
Mark Ruga	4		–	–	12	12	–	–	12	12	–	–
Daniel Sikuta	3		–	–	–	–	–	–	2	2	2	–
Daniel Taabu	9	Forward	1	1	1	1	10	1	1	1	1	–
Brian Wahinya	6		9	9	4	4	4	13	–	–	–	
Brian Wandera	5		–	–	7	7	7	–	–	–	7	7
Michael Wanjala	5		–	–	9	9	9	9	–	–	–	1

== New Zealand ==
Coach: Clark Laidlaw

New Zealand team members 2018–19
Player	Apps	Position	Jersey number by tournament									
Player	Apps	Position	Dubai	Cape Town	Hamilton	Sydney	Las Vegas	Vancouver	Hong Kong	Singapore	London	Paris
Kurt Baker	6	Back	–	–	10	10	10	–	10	10	10	–
Dylan Collier	7	Forward	5	5	5	–	–	–	5	5	5	5
Scott Curry	6	Forward	**1**	–	**1**	–	–	–	**1**	**1**	**1**	**1**
Sam Dickson	7	Forward	7	–	7	7	7	7	7	7	–	–
Scott Gregory	7	Back	10	10	13	1	5	5	–	–	7	–
Taylor Haugh	1		–	13	–	–	–	–	–	–	–	–
Trael Joass	4	Forward	–	1	–	13	1	1	–	–	–	–
Andrew Knewstubb	9	Back	8	8	8	8	–	8	8	8	8	8
Vilimoni Koroi	8	Back	13	6	6	6	6	6	–	–	6	13
Luke Masirewa	2	Forward	2	2	–	–	–	–	–	–	–	–
Tim Mikkelson	6	Forward	–	–	**2**	**2**	**2**	**2**	**2**	**2**	**2**	**2**
Ngarohi McGarvey-Black	4	Back	4	4	–	–	–	10	–	–	–	10
Sione Molia	9	Back	12	12	12	**12**	**12**	**12**	12	–	12	12
Etene Nanai-Seturo	1	Forward	–	9	–	–	–	–	–	–	–	–
Jona Nareki	9	Back	–	11	11	11	11	11	6	6	4	6
Tone Ng Shiu	10	Forward	3	3	3	3	3	3	3	3	3	3
Amanaki Nicole	5	Forward	11	7	–	5	–	–	–	13	–	7
Joe Ravouvou	8	Back	–	–	4	4	4	4	4	4	13	4
Akuila Rokolisoa	4	Back	6	–	–	–	8	–	13	12	–	–
Te Puoho Stephens	2		–	–	–	–	13	13	–	–	–	–
Regan Ware	9	Back	9	–	9	9	9	9	9	9	9	9
Joe Webber	4	Back	–	–	–	–	–	–	11	11	11	11

== Samoa ==
Coach: Gordon Tietjens

Samoa team members 2018–19
Player	Apps	Position	Jersey number by tournament									
Player	Apps	Position	Dubai	Cape Town	Hamilton	Sydney	Las Vegas	Vancouver	Hong Kong	Singapore	London	Paris
David Afamasaga	10	Forward	12	12	**12**	**12**	**12**	**12**	**12**	**12**	**12**	**12**
Elisapeta Alofipo	10	Back	11	11	11	10	10	10	10	10	10	10
Tomasi Alosio	8	Back	8	8	8	8	–	–	8	8	8	8
Siaosi Asofolau	8	Back	3	3	3	1	3	–	3	13	1	–
Ricky Ene	2	Back	13	13	–	–	–	–	–	–	–	–
Maauga Iamanu	3		–	–	–	–	5	5	–	–	–	6
Laaloi Leilua	4		–	–	–	–	–	–	11	11	4	4
Philip Luki	3		–	–	–	–	–	–	–	3	13	1
Ikifusi Matamu	2		–	–	13	13	–	–	–	–	–	–
Melani Matavao	5		–	–	–	–	7	7	7	7	6	–
Tila Mealoi	8	Back	9	9	–	–	9	9	9	9	9	9
Alamanda Motuga	10	Forward	2	2	2	2	2	2	2	2	2	2
Della Neli	2	Forward	6	6	–	–	–	–	–	–	–	–
Murphy Paulo	5	Back	–	–	6	6	6	6	6	–	–	–
Gasologa Pelenato	1		–	–	–	–	–	13	–	–	–	–
Joe Perez	6	Back	–	–	10	11	11	11	–	–	11	11
Johnny Samuelu	10	Forward	4	4	4	4	4	3	13	5	3	3
Kirisimasi Savaiinaea	4	Forward	1	1	1	3	–	–	–	–	–	–
Paul Scanlan	3		–	–	–	–	–	–	5	6	7	–
Tofatu Solia	4		–	–	–	–	1	1	1	1	–	–
Paulo Toilolo Fanuasa	1		–	–	–	–	–	–	–	–	–	7
Alatasi Tupou	4	Back	**7**	**7**	7	7	–	–	–	–	–	–
Danny Tusitala	6	Back	5	5	5	5	13	4	–	–	–	–
John Vaili	10	Back	10	10	9	9	8	8	4	4	5	5
Sione Young Yen	1		–	–	–	–	–	–	–	–	–	13

== Scotland ==
Coach:

- John Dalziel (to Singapore)
- Scott Forrest (interim)

Scotland team members 2018–19
Player	Apps	Position	Jersey number by tournament									
Player	Apps	Position	Dubai	Cape Town	Hamilton	Sydney	Las Vegas	Vancouver	Hong Kong	Singapore	London	Paris
Kaleem Barreto	2		–	–	–	–	–	–	–	–	8	8
Tom Brown	3	Back	–	–	–	–	–	–	3	3	5	–
Glenn Bryce	9	Back	6	6	6	–	6	6	6	6	6	6
Alec Coombes	6	Back	–	–	13	6	3	3	–	–	3	3
Jack Cuthbert	2	Back	–	–	–	–	13	13	–	–	–	–
Harvey Elms	8	Back	5	5	5	5	5	5	5	5	–	–
Jamie Farndale	10	Forward	7	7	**7**	**7**	**7**	**7**	**7**	**7**	**7**	**7**
Robbie Fergusson	10	Back	**4**	**4**	**4**	**4**	**4**	**4**	**4**	**4**	**4**	**4**
Nyle Godsmark	10	Forward	2	2	2	2	2	2	2	2	2	2
Sean Kennedy	2	Forward	–	–	–	–	–	–	8	8	–	–
Gavin Lowe	10	Back	10	10	10	10	10	10	10	10	10	10
Mungo Mason	2		13	13	–	–	–	–	–	–	–	–
Ross McCann	10	Back	12	12	12	12	12	12	13	13	13	5
Max McFarland	10	Back	11	11	11	11	11	11	11	11	11	11
Ally Miller	5	Forward	–	–	–	13	–	–	1	1	1	1
Joe Nayacavou	6	Forward	8	8	8	8	–	–	12	12	–	–
Sam Pecqueur	9	Back	9	9	9	9	9	9	9	9	9	–
Scott Riddell	7	Forward	1	1	1	1	1	1	–	–	–	9
Kyle Rowe	2		–	–	–	–	–	–	–	–	12	12
Charlie Shiel	2	Forward	–	–	–	–	8	8	–	–	–	–
Kyle Steyn	4	Back	3	3	3	3	–	–	–	–	–	–

== South Africa ==
Coach: Neil Powell

South Africa team members 2018–19
Player	Apps	Position	Jersey number by tournament									
Player	Apps	Position	Dubai	Cape Town	Hamilton	Sydney	Las Vegas	Vancouver	Hong Kong	Singapore	London	Paris
Cecil Afrika	1		–	–	–	–	–	–	–	–	–	10
Kurt-Lee Arendse	4		–	–	–	–	–	13	6	6	4	–
Kyle Brown	4	Forward	6	6	6	13	–	–	–	–	–	–
Angelo Davids	2		–	–	–	–	–	–	12	12	–	–
Selvyn Davids	9	Back	13	13	8	8	8	8	8	8	8	–
Zain Davids	5	Forward	4	4	4	4	–	1	–	–	–	–
Chris Dry	4	Forward	–	–	1	1	–	–	1	1	–	–
Muller du Plessis	5	Back	12	12	–	–	13	12	–	–	12	12
Branco du Preez	9	Back	7	7	7	7	7	7	7	7	7	7
Stedman Gans	7	Back	–	–	12	12	10	10	10	10	10	–
Justin Geduld	9	Back	9	9	9	9	9	9	9	9	9	9
Dewald Human	4	Back	10	10	10	10	–	–	–	–	–	8
Werner Kok	9	Forward	5	5	5	5	5	5	5	5	5	5
Sako Makata	5		–	–	–	–	4	4	2	2	2	2
James Murphy	2	Forward	–	–	–	–	–	–	13	13	–	–
Mfundo Ndhlovu	2	Back	–	–	–	–	12	–	–	–	–	4
Ryan Oosthuizen	6	Forward	3	3	–	–	1	–	4	4	1	1
JC Pretorius	5	Forward	–	–	13	6	6	6	–	–	6	6
Philip Snyman	7	Forward	**2**	**2**	**2**	**2**	**2**	**2**	–	–	13	13
Siviwe Soyizwapi	9	Back	11	11	11	11	11	11	**11**	**11**	**11**	**11**
Rosko Specman	2	Back	8	8	–	–	–	–	–	–	–	–
Impi Visser	9	Forward	1	1	3	3	3	3	3	3	3	3

== Spain ==
Coach: Pablo Feijoo

Spain team members 2018–19
Player	Apps	Position	Jersey number by tournament									
Player	Apps	Position	Dubai	Cape Town	Hamilton	Sydney	Las Vegas	Vancouver	Hong Kong	Singapore	London	Paris
Alejandro Alonso	8	Back	12	12	12	12	12	12	13	12	–	–
Daniel Barranco	2		–	–	–	–	11	2	–	–	–	–
Javier Carrión	7	Back	10	10	10	10	10	10	–	–	**10**	**10**
Javier de Juan	8	Forward	3	3	3	3	3	3	3	3	–	–
Rafael de Santiago	6		–	–	13	13	–	–	10	10	5	5
Alberto Diaz	3		–	–	9	9	–	–	–	–	9	–
Pablo Fontes	8	Back	4	4	4	4	4	4	–	–	4	4
Francisco Hernández	7	Back	**6**	**6**	**6**	**6**	**6**	**6**	**6**	**6**	–	–
Jordi Jorba	1		–	–	–	–	–	–	–	8	–	–
Eduardo Lopez	2		–	–	–	–	–	–	–	–	3	3
Joan Losada	8	Back	9	9	2	2	2	9	9	9	–	–
Martin Iñaki Mateu	9		8	13	8	8	9	8	8	–	11	12
Juan Martínez	3		–	–	–	–	7	11	–	–	–	7
Jaime Mata	4		–	–	–	–	–	–	11	11	6	6
Sergio Molinero	2		–	–	–	–	–	–	–	–	12	2
Francisco Osete	1		–	–	–	–	–	–	–	–	–	11
Diego Periel	2		–	–	–	–	13	13	–	–	–	–
Pol Pla	5	Back	7	7	7	7	–	7	–	–	–	–
Marcos Poggi	5	Back	11	8	–	–	8	–	–	–	13	13
Juan Ramos	8	Back	13	11	11	11	–	–	4	4	8	8
Ignacio Rodriguez-Guerra	8	Back	1	1	1	1	1	1	–	–	1	1
Manuel Sainz-Trapaga	8	Forward	5	5	5	5	5	5	5	5	–	–
Tobias Sainz-Trapaga	5	Forward	2	2	–	–	–	–	1	1	2	–
Alejandro Sánchez	3		–	–	–	–	–	–	7	7	7	–
Cristian Serra	2		–	–	–	–	–	–	12	13	–	–
Josh Taylor	2		–	–	–	–	–	–	2	2	–	–
Matías Tudela	1		–	–	–	–	–	–	–	–	–	9

== United States ==
Coach: Mike Friday

United States team members 2018–19
Player	Apps	Position	Jersey number by tournament									
Player	Apps	Position	Dubai	Cape Town	Hamilton	Sydney	Las Vegas	Vancouver	Hong Kong	Singapore	London	Paris
Perry Baker	5	Back	11	11	11	–	–	–	–	–	11	11
Danny Barrett	7	Forward	3	3	3	3	3	–	–	–	3	3
Pat Blair	3	Forward	–	–	13	13	–	–	–	13	–	–
Ben Broselle	4		–	–	–	–	13	13	13	12	–	–
Maceo Brown	10	Back	8	8	8	8	8	8	8	8	13	13
Madison Hughes	10	Back	**10**	**10**	**10**	**10**	**10**	**10**	**10**	**10**	**10**	**10**
Martin Iosefo	9	Back	12	12	12	12	12	12	12	– ^{a}	12	12
Carlin Isles	10	Back	1	1	1	1	1	1	1	1	1	1
Matai Leuta	9	Forward	4	4	–	11	4	4	4	4	4	4
Folau Niua	10	Back	7	7	7	7	7	7	7	7	7	7
Ben Pinkelman	10	Forward	2	2	2	2	2	2	2	2	2	2
Joe Schroeder	4	Forward	–	–	–	–	–	3	3	3	–	5
Brett Thompson	9	Forward	5	5	5	5	5	5	5	5	5	–
Stephen Tomasin	10	Forward	9	9	9	9	9	9	9	9	9	9
Marcus Tupuola	8	Back	13	13	–	–	11	11	11	11	8	8
Anthony Welmers	2	Forward	–	–	4	4	–	–	–	–	–	–
Kevon Williams	9	Back	6	6	6	6	6	6	6	6	6	6

Notes

^a At Singapore, the United States had a late injury to Martin Iosefo which ruled him out of the team. Ben Broselle was elevated to the twelve. Pat Blair joined the squad as the thirteenth man.

== Wales ==
Coach: Richie Pugh

Wales team members 2018–19
Player	Apps	Position	Jersey number by tournament									
Player	Apps	Position	Dubai	Cape Town	Hamilton	Sydney	Las Vegas	Vancouver	Hong Kong	Singapore	London	Paris
Afon Bagshaw	8	Forward	9	9	–	–	9	9	9	9	9	9
Taine Basham	2	Forward	2	2	–	–	–	–	–	–	–	–
Sion Bennett	2	Forward	–	–	2	2	–	–	–	–	–	–
Dane Blacker	4		4	4	4	4	–	–	–	–	–	–
Ben Cambriani	6		–	–	–	–	4	4	3	3	3	3
Ryan Conbeer	3	Back	10	–	–	–	–	–	13	4	–	–
Ethan Davies	5		–	–	–	–	7	7	–	5	7	7
Cai Devine	10	Forward	3	3	13	11	8	8	8	8	8	8
Rio Dyer	4	Back	–	–	3	3	3	13	–	–	–	–
George Gasson	9	Back	–	13	10	10	10	10	10	10	10	10
Joe Goodchild	10	Back	13	10	8	8	13	3	4	13	4	4
Joe Jenkins	3	Forward	–	–	11	–	–	–	–	–	13	12
Owen Jenkins	8	Forward	5	5	5	5	5	5	5	–	5	5
Ben Jones	2	Back	6	6	–	–	–	–	–	–	–	–
Jay Jones	2		7	7	–	–	–	–	–	–	–	–
Cameron Lewis	5		–	–	–	–	2	2	6	6	6	6
Tomi Lewis	4	Back	11	11	–	–	–	–	2	2	–	–
Reuben Morgan-Williams	6		–	–	7	7	–	–	7	7	2	2
Ben Roach	8	Forward	12	12	12	12	12	12	12	12	–	–
Tom Rogers	8		–	–	9	9	11	11	11	11	11	11
Dafydd Smith	5	Back	–	–	6	6	6	6	–	–	–	13
Will Talbot-Davies	2	Back	8	8	–	–	–	–	–	–	–	–
Will Thomas	1		–	–	–	13	–	–	–	–	–	–
Luke Treharne	9	Back	**1**	**1**	**1**	**1**	**1**	**1**	**1**	**1**	**1**	**1**
Morgan Williams	1	Back	–	–	–	–	–	–	–	–	12	–

== Non-core teams ==
One place in each tournament of the series is allocated to a national team based on performance in the respective continental tournaments within Africa, Asia, Europe, Oceania, and the Americas.

=== Chile ===
Coach: Edmundo Olfos

Chile team members 2018–19
Player	Apps	Position	Number	
Player	Apps	Position	Las Vegas	Vancouver
Julio Blanc	2		11	11
Felipe Brangier	1		**1**	–
Pablo Byers	2		8	8
Benjamin De Vidts	2		12	12
Rodrigo Fernández	2		5	5
Juan Pablo Larenas	1		–	10
Francisco Metuaze	2		9	9
Pablo Metuaze	2		6	6
Felipe Neira	2		4	1
Francisco Neira	2		3	4
Ignacio Silva	2		7	**7**
Francisco Urroz	1		10	–
Martin Verschae	1		–	3
Pedro Verschae	2		2	2

=== Hong Kong ===
Coach: Paul John

Hong Kong team members 2018–19
Player	Apps	Position	Number
Player	Apps	Position	Singapore
Seb Brien	1		4
Toby Fenn	1		2
Liam Herbert	1		9
Jamie Hood	1		8
Cado Lee	1		6
Alex McQueen	1		10
Raef Morrison	1		3
Jack Neville	1		7
Harry Sayers	1		5
Russell Webb	1		11
Max Woodward	1		**1**
Salom Yiu	1	Back	12

=== Ireland ===
Coach: Anthony Eddy

Ireland team members 2018–19
Player	Apps	Position	Number	
Player	Apps	Position	London	Paris
Jack Daly	2	Forward	4	5
Shane Daly	1	Forward	–	1
Jordan Conroy	1	Back	7	–
Billy Dardis	2	Back	**6**	**6**
Ian Fitzpatrick	2	Forward	5	13
Cormac Izuchukwu	1	Forward	–	4
Jack Kelly	2	Back	8	8
Terry Kennedy	1	Back	9	–
Adam Leavy	1	Forward	1	–
Hugo Lennox	2	Back	10	10
Peter Maher	1	Back	–	7
Mick McGrath	2	Forward	2	2
Harry McNulty	2	Forward	3	3
Greg O'Shea	1	Back	–	11
Bryan Mollen	2	Back	12	12
Mark Roche	1	Back	11	–
Peter Sullivan	2	Back	13	9

=== Portugal ===
Coach: Diogo Mateus

Portugal team members 2018–19
Player	Apps	Position	Number
Player	Apps	Position	Hong Kong
Jorge Abecasis	1		**4**
Frederico Caetano	1		8
Fábio Conceição	1	Forward	7
Tiago Fernandes	1	Forward	1
Rodrigo Freudenthal	1		5
Nuno Guedes	1		10
Frederico Filipe	1		13
Manuel Marta	1		9
Rodrigo Marta	1		11
Vasco Ribeiro	1	Forward	2
Pedro Silvério	1	Forward	6
Raffaele Storti	1		12
António Vidinha	1		3

=== Tonga ===
Coach: Tevita Tuʻifua

Tonga team members 2018–19
Player	Apps	Position	Number	
Player	Apps	Position	Hamilton	Sydney
Tali Finau	2		3	3
Tana Fotofili	2		**1**	12
Maui Hausia	1		9	–
Fine Inisi	2		8	8
Lotu Inisi	2		4	4
Potolaka Maake	2		13	9
Otu Mausia	2		12	1
Fetuli Paea	2		5	5
Atieli Pakalani	2	Back	10	**10**
Taniela Samita	2		7	7
Edward Sunia	2		2	2
John Tapueluelu	2		11	11
Akuila Tuha	1		–	13
Sione Tupou	2		6	6

=== Zimbabwe ===
Coach: Gilbert Nyamutsamba

Zimbabwe team members 2018–19
Player	Apps	Position	Number	
Player	Apps	Position	Dubai	Cape Town
Ngoni Chibuwe	2		5	5
Tafadzwa Chitokwindo	2		7	7
Kudakwashe Chiwanza	2		4	4
Stephan Hunduza	2		**11**	**11**
Shingi Katsvere	2		6	6
Takudzwa Kumadiro	2		9	9
Nelson Madida	2		3	3
Kudzai Mashawi	2		1	13
Tarisai Mugariri	2		10	10
Riaan O'Neill	2		12	12
Connor Pritchard	2		2	2
Biselele Tshamala	2		8	8
Tapiwa Tsomondo	1		–	1

== See also ==
- 2018–19 World Rugby Women's Sevens Series squads
