= 2019 Hong Kong Sevens =

Rugby sevens tournament

- Sevens World Series XX
- Host nation: Hong Kong
- Date: 5–7 April 2019

Cup
- Champion: Fiji
- Runner-up: France
- Third: United States

Challenge
- Winner: Scotland

Qualifier
- Winner: Ireland

Tournament details
- Matches played: 45
- Tries scored: 274 (average 6.09 per match)
- Most points: (Japan) Katsuyuki Sakai (50)
- Most tries: (United States) Carlin Isles (9)

The 2019 Hong Kong Sevens was a rugby sevens tournament that took place at the Hong Kong Stadium between the 5–7 April 2019. It was the 44th edition of the Hong Kong Sevens, and the seventh tournament of the 2018–19 World Rugby Sevens Series. Sixteen teams competed in the main tournament, while a further twelve competed in a qualifier tournament with the winner getting core team status for the 2019–20 World Rugby Sevens Series.

After securing three wins from three in their "pool of death", Fiji became the first team to win five consecutive Hong Kong titles after they defeated France 21–7. The United States came in third after losing to Fiji in the semi-final before dispatching Samoa (who lost to France) in the third place playoff by 12 points. In the Challenge Trophy, Scotland defeated Japan by two points with Gavin Lowe scoring the match winning try for Scotland. This meant that after seven rounds of the series, the United States margin was dropped to only seven points from second place Fiji with New Zealand a fellow five points behind after they finished sixth in Hong Kong.

The World Series Qualifier tournament saw Ireland and Hong Kong make the final after they defeated Germany and Chile in the respective semi finals. In the final it was Ireland who got core status for the first time in the nation's history after they defeated Hong Kong 28–7 to be able to compete in all events as a core nation for the 2019–20 season.

== Background ==
The 2019 Hong Kong Sevens is the seventh round of ten in the 2018–19 season and the 44th edition of the tournament since its inception in 1976. Heading into the round the United States was leading the series with 113 points from six rounds. This meant that they had a seven-point gap over second place New Zealand after finishing in fourth place in the previous round while New Zealand came in fifth. Behind them was Fiji and South Africa with both teams making the cup semis with South Africa taking out the title in Vancouver. Outside of the top four spots, England was on 80 points with Australia sixth with 65. On 13 March, news about the future of the series was announced with the Hong Kong Sevens being one of six combined rounds in the men's and women's series starting from the 2019–20 season with the other tournaments being Dubai, Cape Town, New Zealand, Sydney and Paris.

== Teams ==
Sixteen teams competed in the main tournament with the fifteen teams being core teams to the series. The sixteenth team in Portugal was invited by World Rugby to fill the remaining spot in the draw. A further twelve teams will compete in the World Series Qualifier tournament with the winner to replace the bottom ranked team after the end of the season. Ten teams will be returning from last year with only Russia and the Philippines not competing in the previous year.

- Argentina
- Australia
- Canada
- England
- Fiji
- France
- Japan
- Kenya
- New Zealand
- Portugal
- Samoa
- Scotland
- South Africa
- Spain
- United States
- Wales

== Format ==
The teams were divided into pools of four teams, who played a round-robin within the pool. Points were awarded in each pool on the standard schedule for rugby sevens tournaments (though different from the standard in the 15-man game)—3 for a win, 2 for a draw, 1 for a loss. The main draw consists of sixteen teams with fifteen of them being core teams that compete in each series event, plus an invitational team (Portugal). These teams competed in Pools A, B, C, and D. The winners and runners-up from each pool in the main draw qualified for the Cup quarterfinals. The losers of these quarterfinals competed in the Challenge Trophy bracket. The qualifying tournament features twelve teams from the six regional championships. These teams play in Pool E, F and G. The top two teams from each pool, plus the top two third-place teams, advanced to the knockout stage. The winner of the qualifying event books a spot as a core team for the following World Series season (2019–20).

== Summary ==
=== Day 1 ===
The opening day of the tournament saw the first eight games of the pool stage. The United States who were predicted to be the favourites for the tournament got off to a good start by defeating Spain 36–7 in the opening match of Pool D with Stephen Tomasin scoring a double. England survived a scare in their match with Wales after being behind by 14 points at the half before coming back with Dan Norton breaking the all-time leading try scorer record. England would go on to win the match 36–19.

The New Zealand team paid tribute to the victims from the Christchurch massacre as they wore white instead of their traditional black as they knock off Australia 40–19. Fiji began their defence of the title as they defeated Kenya 22–5 in the other match of Pool C in what was a repeat of last year's final. The cup finalists from the previous round won their first games with France smashing Portugal 40–7 while South Africa was given an early scare in their 22–7 win over Japan. The other two games saw Samoa and Argentina record wins over their opposition.

=== Day 2 ===
The second day of the tournament saw the remaining sixteen matches being played in the groups. The main action from the second day was in Pool D with the United States losing to Wales in the second match of the day despite a hat-trick from Carlin Isles. The United States would qualify through to the knockout stage after Spain defeated Wales by sixteen points to make it through by point differential. England was the second team that qualified as they defeated Spain 54–5 before knocking off the leaders in the final match of the pool. Fiji kept their defence alive after topping Pool C following a win over New Zealand in what was described as the "group of death". Earlier they defeated Australia 31–12 to eliminate the Australians from title contention. New Zealand finished in second place after they dispatch Kenya 36–0 to qualify through to the cup quarter-finals.

France finished top of Pool B after they came from seven points down in the match against Argentina to record a 26–14 which featured four different try scorers. Argentina would join them in the quarters after getting past Portugal in what was a tough match for Argentina. This was due to them being down by 14 points early in the second half before recovering to a 26–21 win with a Luciano Gonzalez try with only two minutes left on the clock. South Africa also remained perfect in the quest for their first Hong Kong title after they finished top of Pool A with a 21–7 over fellow qualifiers Samoa. For Scotland and Japan they were relegated to the challenge trophy after losing their second matches earlier in the pool.

=== Day 3 ===
The third day of competition saw the tournament head to the knockout phase of the competition. The quarter finals saw an upset in the final quarter final match with France defeating New Zealand for the first time at the event. Manoel Dall'igna from the French team responded, "we played like a team, played very well together," in the 14–12 victory. Fiji received a massive shock in their quarter final match with the team going down 12–0 early in the first half. Two tries from Paula Dranisinukula brought Fiji back into the match as they levelled with their opponents at the half. The second half saw the Fijians taking the lead and ending up winners by five points. South Africa attempt to win their first Hong Kong Sevens ended with a loss against the United States while Samoa defeated England 14–12 after Dan Bibby had to be carried off the field in the first half.

In the semi-finals, Fiji defeated the Americans by nine points in the first semi final to book a spot in their fifth consecutive Hong Kong final. Sevuloni Mocenacagi opened the scoring for Fiji in the second minute of play before Carlin Isles scored his first of two tries for the game to level the match. The Fijians scored tries either side of the half to give them the victory and a spot in the cup final. Their opponent in the final was France who made it to their second consecutive cup final for the season after dispatching Samoa in the other semi. The game which saw Samoa having to catch up after the French got the lead in the first minute from a Gabin Villière try. With the match see-sawing towards a result, a controversial try from Aurelien Callandret sealed the win for France despite replays showing the foot touching the line.

Vilimoni Botitu opened the scoring for Fiji with a try in the fourth minute to give Fiji the early lead in the final against France. Fiji extended their lead at the end of the first half with Aminiasi Tuimaba scoring the first of two tries in the match to give Fiji a fourteen-point lead at the break. A penalty try at the start of the second half gave France some hope. But Tuimaba got his second try of the match to give Fiji the win. This win saw Fiji became the first team to win five consecutive Hong Kong titles. In the third place play-off, the United States defeated Samoa 22–10 as they had four different try scorers in the twelve point victory.

In the World Series Qualifier, Ireland and Hong Kong met in the qualifier final to see who would qualify through to the World Series. This was after they had defeated Germany and Chile earlier in the day. Harry McNulty scored the first try in the third minute of play to give Ireland the lead. This was followed by tries from Greg O'Shea and Jordan Conroy at either end of the half time to give Ireland a 21-point advantage. From there they wouldn't lose the lead despite Hong Kong getting a try back to give some sniff of a victory and for Ireland they received core status.

== Main draw ==
=== Pool stage ===
All times in Hong Kong Time (UTC+08:00).

==== Pool A ====
Pos	Team	Pld	W	D	L	PF	PA	PD	Pts
1	South Africa	3	3	0	0	69	24	+45	9
2	Samoa	3	2	0	1	55	49	+6	7
3	Scotland	3	1	0	2	50	62	−12	5
4	Japan	3	0	0	3	47	86	−39	3

5 April 2019
17:42

Samoa	17–7	Scotland
Try: Matavao 7'c Vaili 8'm Solia 11'm Con: Mealoi (1/3) 7'	Report	Try: McFarland 3'c Con: Lowe (1/1) 3'

Hong Kong Stadium
Referee: Jérémy Rozier (France)

5 April 2019
18:06

South Africa	22–7	Japan
Try: Kok (2) 2'm, 8'c Geduld 9'm Soyizwapi 11'; Con: S. Davids (1/2) 8'; Du Preez (0/2)	Report	Try: Lisala 0'c Con: Sakai (1/1) 1'

Hong Kong Stadium
Referee: Paulo Duarte (Portugal)

6 April 2019
11:16

Samoa	31–21	Japan
Try: Motuga 0'c Matavao 3'm Leilua 5'c Solia 12'm Con: Alosio (2/4) 0', 6'; Leilua (1/1) 7'	Report	Try: Soejima 4'c Lisala 7'c Sakai 10'c Con: Sakai (3/3) 4', 7', 10'

Hong Kong Stadium
Referee: Matt Rodden (Hong Kong)

6 April 2019
11:41

South Africa	26–10	Scotland
Try: S. Davids; Gans 7'm Oosthuizen 8'c Du Preez 10'c Con: S. Davids (1/2) 6'; Geduld (1/1) 9'; Du Preez (1/1) 10'	Report	Try: Farndale 12'm Brown 13'm Con: Lowe (0/2)

Hong Kong Stadium
Referee: Richard Kelly (New Zealand)

6 April 2019
15:00

Scotland	33–19	Japan
Try: Farndale (2) 5'c, 10'm, 12'c Lowe 8'c Kennedy 13'; Con: Lowe (4/5) 5', 9', 12', 14'; Elms (0/1)	Report	Try: Tuqiri 0'c Fujita (2) 2'm, 6'c Con: Sakai (2/2) 1', 7'

Hong Kong Stadium
Referee: Damián Schneider (Argentina)

6 April 2019
15:22

South Africa	21–7	Samoa
Try: Visser 3'c Geduld 8'c Kok 11'c Con: Du Preez (2/2) 4', 9'; S. Davids (1/1) 11'	Report	Try: Alosio 14'c Con: Paulo (1/1) 14'

Hong Kong Stadium
Referee: James Doleman (New Zealand)

==== Pool B ====
Pos	Team	Pld	W	D	L	PF	PA	PD	Pts
1	France	3	3	0	0	90	33	+57	9
2	Argentina	3	2	0	1	59	61	−2	7
3	Canada	3	1	0	2	45	55	−10	5
4	Portugal	3	0	0	3	40	85	−45	3

5 April 2019
20:01

Argentina	19–14	Canada
Try: Osadczuk 3'm Álvarez 5'c Gonzalez 9'c Con: Mare (2/3) 6', 9'	Report	Try: Douglas 11'c Braid 11'c Con: Hirayama (2/2) 11', 12'

Hong Kong Stadium
Referee: Jordan Way (Australia)

5 April 2019
20:26

France	40–7	Portugal
Try: Veredamu (2) 1'c, 14'c O'Connor 4'c Villière 7'c Barraque 9'm Alerte 12'c Con: Barraque (3/4) 2', 4', 7'; Parez (2/2) 12', 14'	Report	Try: Conceição 5'c Con: Abecasis (1/1) 6'

Hong Kong Stadium
Referee: Sam Grove-White (Scotland)

6 April 2019
13:35

Argentina	26–21	Portugal
Try: Osadczuk 1'c Mare 10'c Gonzalez (2) 11'c, 13'm Con: Mare (3/4) 2', 10', 11'	Report	Try: Abecasis (2) 4'c, 8'c Conceição 7'c Con: Sousa Guedes (2/2) 4', 7'; Abecasis (1/1) 8'

Hong Kong Stadium
Referee: Jérémy Rozier (France)

6 April 2019
13:59

France	24–12	Canada
Try: Siega (2) 0'c, 6'm Parez 3'm Dall'igna 9'c Con: Barraque (2/4) 3', 10'	Report	Try: Braid 8'c Kaay 12'; Con: Hirayama (1/2) 8'

Hong Kong Stadium
Referee: Craig Evans (Wales)

6 April 2019
17:17

Canada	19–12	Portugal
Try: Jones 3'c Hirayama 6'c Douglas 8'm Con: Hirayama (2/3) 3', 6'	Report	Try: Freudenthal 1'm Marta 11'c Con: Sousa Guedes (1/1) 11'; Abecasis (0/1)

Hong Kong Stadium
Referee: Sam Grove-White (Scotland)

6 April 2019
17:41

France	26–14	Argentina
Try: Alerte 4'c Villière 8'c Siega 10'c Parez 12'; Con: Barraque (3/3) 5', 9', 10'; Parez (0/1)	Report	Try: Mare 1'c Bazan Velez 6'c Con: Mare (2/2) 2', 7'

Hong Kong Stadium
Referee: Richard Kelly (New Zealand)

==== Pool C ====
Pos	Team	Pld	W	D	L	PF	PA	PD	Pts
1	Fiji	3	3	0	0	77	22	+55	9
2	New Zealand	3	2	0	1	81	43	+38	7
3	Australia	3	1	0	2	59	83	−24	5
4	Kenya	3	0	0	3	17	86	−69	3

5 April 2019
19:15

New Zealand	40–19	Australia
Try: Ravouvou (2) 0'c, 9'c Ware 3'c Dickson 9'c Nareki 11'c Webber 12'm Con: Knewstubb (5/6) 1', 3', 10', 10', 11'	Report	Try: Malouf 5'c Longbottom 6'c Pietsch 14'm Con: Holland (2/3) 5', 6'

Hong Kong Stadium
Referee: Craig Evans (Wales)

5 April 2019
19:37

Fiji	22–5	Kenya
Try: Tuimaba 0'; Botitu 2'c Tuwai 4'm Naduva 12'm Con: Ikanikoda (1/2) 3'; Veilawa (0/1)	Report	Try: Oluoch 9'm Con: Taabu (0/1)

Hong Kong Stadium
Referee: James Doleman (New Zealand)

6 April 2019
12:51

New Zealand	36–0	Kenya
Try: Ravouvou (2) 1'c, 2'm Ware (2) 8'm, 9'c Webber 11'm Curry 12'c Con: Knewstubb (3/6) 1', 10', 13'	Report

Hong Kong Stadium
Referee: Sam Grove-White (Scotland)

6 April 2019
13:13

Fiji	31–12	Australia
Try: Tuimaba (2) 0'c, 6'm Tuwai (2) 4'm, 7'c Botitu 10'c Con: Ikanikoda (2/2) 1', 8'; Veilawa (1/1) 10'; Botitu (0/2)	Report	Try: O'Donnell 2'm Pietsch 12'c Con: Holland (1/2) 12'

Hong Kong Stadium
Referee: Paulo Duarte (Portugal)

6 April 2019
16:33

Australia	28–12	Kenya
Try: Longbottom 2'c Hutchison (2) 3'c, 9'c Miller 7'c Con: Holland (3/3) 2', 4', 7'; McNamara (1/1) 10'	Report	Try: Mwale 8'c Oluoch 11'm Con: Olindi (1/1) 8'; Taabu (0/1)

Hong Kong Stadium
Referee: Jérémy Rozier (France)

6 April 2019
16:55

Fiji	24–5	New Zealand
Try: Tuimaba 2'm Botitu 4'c Ikanikoda 6'c Cakaubalavu 11'; Con: Ikanikoda (2/3) 5', 6'; Veilawa (0/1)	Report	Try: Ravouvou 12'; Con: Knewstubb (0/1)

Hong Kong Stadium
Referee: Jordan Way (Australia)

==== Pool D ====
Pos	Team	Pld	W	D	L	PF	PA	PD	Pts
1	England	3	3	0	0	118	46	+72	9
2	United States	3	1	0	2	77	56	+21	5
3	Wales	3	1	0	2	50	81	−31	5
4	Spain	3	1	0	2	38	100	−62	5

5 April 2019
18:31

England	36–19	Wales
Try: Muir 0'm Norton 7'c Ellery (2) 10'm, 13'; Burgess 11'c Edwards 14'c Con: Bibby (3/6) 8', 11, 14'	Report	Try: Goodchild 2'm Rogers (2) 5'c, 7'c Con: Treharne (2/3) 5', 7'

Hong Kong Stadium
Referee: Richard Kelly (New Zealand)

5 April 2019
18:53

United States	36–7	Spain
Try: Tomasin (2) 1'm, 7'c Leuta 4'm Iosefo 5'm Isles 7'c Thompson 12'c Con: Hughes (3/6) 7', 8', 12'	Report	Try: Sánchez 10'c Con: Hernández (1/1) 10'

Hong Kong Stadium
Referee: Damián Schneider (Argentina)

6 April 2019
12:03

England	54–5	Spain
Try: Edwards 2'c, 5'c Norton (2) 3'c, 7'c Kerr 7'c Muir 9'c Bowen 10'c, 12'm Con: Bibby (7/8) 2', 3', 5', 7', 8', 9', 10'	Report	Try: de Juan 14'm Con: Hernández (0/1)

Hong Kong Stadium
Referee: James Doleman (New Zealand)

6 April 2019
12:25

United States	19–21	Wales
Try: Isles (3) 4', 7', 8'; Con: Williams (1/1) 4'; Niua (1/2) 7'	Report	Try: Cambriani 0'c Treharne 6'c Goodchild 12'c Con: Treharne (3/3) 1', 6', 12'

Hong Kong Stadium
Referee: Jordan Way (Australia)

6 April 2019
15:44

Wales	10–26	Spain
Try: Bagshaw 11'm Gasson 14'; Con: Treharne (0/2)	Report	Try: M. Sainz-Trapaga 1'c Hernández 4'c Mata 5'm T. Sainz-Trapaga 13'c Con: Hernández (3/4) 2', 4', 13'

Hong Kong Stadium
Referee: Matt Rodden (Hong Kong)

6 April 2019
16:08

United States	22–28	England
Try: Pinkelman (3) 6'c, 7'm, 8'm Tupuola 14'm Con: Hughes (1/4) 6'	Report	Try: Glover 0'c Norton 2'c Burgess 3'c Ellery 12'c Con: Bibby (1/1) 1', 3', 4', 12'

Hong Kong Stadium
Referee: Craig Evans (Wales)

=== Knockout stage ===
==== Thirteenth place ====
Semi-finals
7 April 2019 – 13:16 – Hong Kong Stadium
Spain	24
Portugal	7
7 April 2019 – 13:43 – Hong Kong Stadium
Wales	29
Canada	14

13th place final
7 April 2019 – 17:00 – Hong Kong Stadium
Spain	19 (a.e.t.)
Wales	14

Matches

Semifinals

7 April 2019
13:16

Spain	24–7	Portugal
Try: Losada 6'c Ramos 8'c Sánchez 12'm Serra Hernández 14'm Con: Hernández (2/4) 6', 9'	Report	Try: Fernandes 4'c Con: Abecasis (1/1) 5'

Hong Kong Stadium
Referee: Francisco González (Uruguay)

7 April 2019
13:43

Wales	29–14	Canada
Try: Roach 0'm Cambriani 7'm Rogers 7'm Morgan-Williams 10'c Bagshaw 11'c Con: Treharne (2/5) 10', 11'	Report	Try: Douglas (2) 3'c, 8'c Con: Hirayama (2/2) 4', 9'

Hong Kong Stadium
Referee: Nehuén Jauri-Rivero (Argentina)

Final

7 April 2019
17:00

Spain	19–14 (a.e.t.)	Wales
Try: Sánchez (3) 4'c, 7'c, 14'; Con: de Santiago (2/2) 5', 7'	Report	Try: Cambriani 2'c Lewis 12'c Con: Treharne (1/1) 2', 12'

Hong Kong Stadium
Referee: Matt Rodden (Hong Kong)

==== Challenge Trophy ====
Quarter-finals
7 April 2019 – 9:30 – Hong Kong Stadium
Scotland	33
Spain	14
7 April 2019 – 9:52 – Hong Kong Stadium
Australia	26
Portugal	21
7 April 2019 – 10:14 – Hong Kong Stadium
Wales	7
Japan	38
7 April 2019 – 10:36 – Hong Kong Stadium
Canada	0
Kenya	19

Semi-finals
7 April 2019 – 14:05 – Hong Kong Stadium
Scotland	19
Australia	17
7 April 2019 – 14:30 – Hong Kong Stadium
Japan	21
Kenya	12

Challenge Trophy final
7 April 2019 – 17:30 – Hong Kong Stadium
Scotland	26
Japan	24

Matches

Quarterfinals

7 April 2019
9:30

Scotland	33–14	Spain
Try: McFarland (3) 6'm, 8'c, 11'c Nayacavou 12'c Lowe 13'c Con: Lowe (4/5) 9', 11', 12', 14'	Report	Try: Mata 1'c de Juan 2'c Con: Hernández (2/2) 1', 3'

Hong Kong Stadium
Referee: Tevita Rokovereni (Fiji)

7 April 2019
9:52

Australia	26–21	Portugal
Try: Longbottom 7'c Kennewell (2) 7'm, 10'c Pincus 11'c Con: Holland (3/4) 7'c, 10', 11'	Report	Try: Marta 1'c Abecasis 2'c Storti 5'c Con: Abecasis (3/3) 1', 3', 5'

Hong Kong Stadium
Referee: Matt Rodden (Hong Kong)

7 April 2019
10:14

Wales	7–38	Japan
Try: Roach 14'c Con: Treharne (1/1) 14'	Report	Try: Lisala (2) 1'm, 9'c Hano 2'm Sakai 3'c Soejima 6'c Toloke 13'c Con: Sakai (4/6) 4', 6', 10', 13'

Hong Kong Stadium

7 April 2019
10:36

Canada	0–19	Kenya
	Report	Try: Oluoch 1'c Amonde 5'c Agero 7'c Con: Agero (2/3) 1', 6'

Hong Kong Stadium
Referee: Damián Schneider (Argentina)

Semifinals

7 April 2019
14:05

Scotland	19–17	Australia
Try: Elms 1'c, 3'm Farndale 9'c Con: Lowe (2/3) 2', 9'	Report	Try: Longbottom 7'm Skelton 10'c Quinn 13'm Con: Holland (1/3) 11'

Hong Kong Stadium
Referee: Jérémy Rozier (France)

7 April 2019
14:30

Japan	21–12	Kenya
Try: Hano 2'c Sakai 8'c Hayashi 9'c Con: Sakai (2/2) 3', 8', 10'	Report	Try: Ligamy 6'm Onyala 11'c Con: Taabu (1/1) 11'; Agero (0/1)

Hong Kong Stadium
Referee: Tevita Rokovereni (Fiji)

Final

7 April 2019
17:30

Scotland	26–24	Japan
Try: McFarland (2) 5'c, 9'm Fergusson 10'c Lowe 11'c Con: Lowe (2/3) 5', 10', 11'	Report	Try: Soejima (2) 0'c, 7'c Fujita 3'm Sakai 7'; Con: Sakai (2/4) 1', 7'm

Hong Kong Stadium
Referee: Damián Schneider (Argentina)

==== 5th place ====
Semi-finals
7 April 2019 – 14:55 – Hong Kong Stadium
South Africa	17
Argentina	19
7 April 2019 – 15:17 – Hong Kong Stadium
England	10
New Zealand	17

5th place final
7 April 2019 – 18:00 – Hong Kong Stadium
Argentina	21
New Zealand	14

Matches

Semifinals

7 April 2019
14:55

South Africa	17–19	Argentina
Try: Soyizwapi 1'm Du Preez 4'c Arendse 8'm Con: Du Preez (1/2) 4'; S. Davids (0/1)	Report	Try: Bazan Velez 7'm Álvarez 7'c Osadczuk 13'c Con: Mare (2/3) 7', 13'

Hong Kong Stadium
Referee: Craig Evans (Wales)

7 April 2019
15:17

England	10–17	New Zealand
Try: Olowofela 7'm Con: Edwards (0/2)	Report	Try: Webber 4'm Collier 6'c Ng Shiu 9'; Con: Rokolisoa (1/3) 6'

Hong Kong Stadium
Referee: Jordan Way (Australia)

Final

7 April 2019
18:00

Argentina	21–14	New Zealand
Try: Sábato 1'c Segura 7'c Osadczuk 14'c Con: Mare (3/3) 1', 7', 14'	Report	Try: Baker 5'c Ng Shiu 9'c Con: Rokolisoa (2/2) 5', 10'

Hong Kong Stadium
Referee: Jérémy Rozier (France)

==== Cup ====
Quarter-finals
7 April 2019 – 10:58 – Hong Kong Stadium
South Africa	12
United States	21
7 April 2019 – 11:20 – Hong Kong Stadium
Fiji	29
Argentina	24
7 April 2019 – 11:42 – Hong Kong Stadium
England	12
Samoa	14
7 April 2019 – 12:07 – Hong Kong Stadium
France	14
New Zealand	12

Semi-finals
7 April 2019 – 15:41 – Hong Kong Stadium
United States	19
Fiji	28
7 April 2019 – 16:03 – Hong Kong Stadium
Samoa	12
France	19

Cup final
7 April 2019 – 19:00 – Hong Kong Stadium
Fiji	21
France	7
Bronze Medal Match
7 April 2019 – 18:30 – Hong Kong Stadium
United States	22
Samoa	10

Matches

Quarterfinals

7 April 2019
10:58

South Africa	12–21	United States
Try: Visser (2) 2'c, 7'm Con: Davids (1/2) 1'	Report	Try: Isles (2) 3'c, 7'c Pinkelman; Con: Hughes (2/2) 4', 7'

Hong Kong Stadium
Referee: James Doleman (New Zealand)

7 April 2019
11:20

Fiji	29–24	Argentina
Try: Dranisinukula (2) 4'c, 7'm Tuimaba 7'm Derenalagi 9'm Veilawa 11'c Con: Ikanikoda (1/3) 5'; Veilawa (1/1) 12'; Botitu (0/1)	Report	Try: Mare 2'm Osadczuk 3'c Gonzalez 6'm Moneta 14'c Con: Mare (1/3) 4'; Bazan Velez (1/1) 14'

Hong Kong Stadium
Referee: Paulo Duarte (Portugal)

7 April 2019
11:42

England	12–14	Samoa
Try: Glover 3'm Norton 7'c Con: Edwards (1/1) 7'; Bibby (0/1)	Report	Try: Vaili 1'c Mealoi 10'c Con: Alosio (1/1) 2'; Mealoi (1/1) 10'

Hong Kong Stadium
Referee: Jérémy Rozier (France)

7 April 2019
12:07

France	14–12	New Zealand
Try: Veredamu 4'c Villière 7'c Con: Parez (2/2) 4', 7'	Report	Try: Baker 1'm Knewstubb 8'c Con: Knewstubb (1/2) 9'

Hong Kong Stadium
Referee: Craig Evans (Welsh Rugby Union)

Semifinals

7 April 2019
15:41

United States	19–28	Fiji
Try: Isles (2) 5'c, 14'm Williams 10'c Con: Hughes (2/3) 5', 10'	Report	Try: Mocenacagi 2'c Botitu 7'c Naduva (2) 8'c, 12'c Con: Ikanikoda (4/4) 3', 7', 9', 12'

Hong Kong Stadium
Referee: Richard Kelly (New Zealand)

7 April 2019
16:03

Samoa	12–19	France
Try: Vaili (2) 2'c, 10'm Con: Alosio (1/1) 3'; Mealoi (0/1)	Report	Try: Villière 0'c Bonnefond 4'c Callandret 11'm Con: Parez (2/3) 1', 5'

Hong Kong Stadium
Referee: Paulo Duarte (Portugal)

Third place

7 April 2019
18:30

United States	22–10	Samoa
Try: Brown 4'm Isles 6'm Schroeder 8'c Tupuola 11'm Con: Tomasin (1/4) 9'	Report	Try: Vaili 7'm Matavao 13'm Con: Alosio (0/2)

Hong Kong Stadium
Referee: Sam Grove-White (Scotland)

Final

7 April 2019
19:00

Fiji	21–7	France
Try: Botitu 4'c Tuimaba (2) 7'c, 10'c Con: Ikanikoda (3/3) 5', 7', 10'	Report	Try: Penalty try 8'

Hong Kong Stadium
Referee: James Doleman (New Zealand)

=== Tournament placings ===
Place	Team	Points
1st place, gold medalist(s)	Fiji	22
2nd place, silver medalist(s)	France	19
3rd place, bronze medalist(s)	United States	17
4	Samoa	15
5	Argentina	13
6	New Zealand	12
7	England	10
7	South Africa	10

Place	Team	Points
9	Scotland	8
10	Japan	7
11	Australia	5
11	Kenya	5
13	Spain	3
14	Wales	2
15	Canada	1
15	Portugal	1

Source: World Rugby

=== Players ===
==== Scoring leaders ====
Tries scored
Rank	Player	Tries
1	Carlin Isles	9
2	(Fiji) Aminiasi Tuimaba	7
3	(Scotland) Max McFarland	6
4	(England) Dan Norton	5
4	(Scotland) Jamie Farndale	5

Points scored
Rank	Player	Points
1	(Japan) Katsuyuki Sakai	50
2	(United States) Carlin Isles	45
3	(Scotland) Gavin Lowe	43
4	(Argentina) Santiago Mare	41
5	(Fiji) Aminiasi Tuimaba	35

Source: World Rugby

==== Dream team ====
The following seven players were selected to the tournament dream team at the conclusion of the tournament:

Forwards	Backs
(Samoa) Tofatu Solia (France) Tavite Veredamu (Fiji) Meli Derenalagi	(Fiji) Jerry Tuwai (France) Gabin Villière (United States) Carlin Isles (Samoa) Johnny Vaili

== World Series qualifier ==
=== Teams ===
Continental sevens championship	Dates	Venue(s)	Berths	Qualified
2018 Europe Grand Prix Series	19 May – 8 Sep 2018	(Russia) Moscow, (Poland) Łódź, (France) Marcoussis (England) Exeter	3	Ireland; Germany; Russia
2018 Asia Rugby Sevens Series	14 Sep – 14 Oct 2018	Hong Kong, (South Korea) Incheon, (Sri Lanka) Colombo	2	Hong Kong; Philippines
2018 RAN Sevens	22–23 Sep 2018	(Barbados) Saint James	1	Jamaica
2018 Africa Men's Sevens	13–14 Oct 2018	(Tunisia) Monastir	2	Zimbabwe; Uganda
2018 Oceania Sevens Championship	9–10 Nov 2018	(Fiji) Suva	2	Tonga; Cook Islands
2019 Sudamérica Rugby Sevens	5–13 Jan 2019	(Uruguay) Punta del Este, (Chile) Viña del Mar	2	Chile; Uruguay
Total			12	

=== Pool stage ===
All times in Hong Kong Time (UTC+08:00).

==== Pool E ====
Pos	Team	Pld	W	D	L	PF	PA	PD	Pts
1	Hong Kong	3	3	0	0	66	36	+30	9
2	Tonga	3	2	0	1	77	48	+29	7
3	Philippines	3	1	0	2	58	81	−23	5
4	Zimbabwe	3	0	0	3	31	67	−36	3

5 April 2019
13:00

Tonga	29–12	Zimbabwe
Try: Osika 2'm Halo (3) 4', 6'c, 11'; F. Inisi 9'c Con: Halo (2/2) 7', 10'; Mausia (0/1)	Report	Try: Hunduza 8'm Tsomondo 14'c Con: O'Neill (1/1) 14'; Rouse (0/1)

Hong Kong Stadium
Referee: Nehuén Jauri-Rivero (Argentina)

5 April 2019
13:24

Hong Kong	33–17	Philippines
Try: A. McQueen (2) 1'c, 3'm Webb 5'c Brien (2) 10'c, 13'; Con: Webb (3/4) 1', 5', 10', 14'	Report	Try: Coleman 7'; Matthews 8'c Dawson 12'; Con: Berry (1/1) 8'

Hong Kong Stadium
Referee: Sam Grove-White (Scotland)

5 April 2019
16:08

Tonga	36–17	Philippines
Try: Tapueluelu 1'm L. Inisi 4'c Moala-Liava'a (3) 6'c, 7'c, 12'm Lokotui 10'm Con: Halo (3/6) 4', 6', 7'	Report	Try: Hardwick 0'm Howe 8'c Coleman 14'm Con: Berry (1/3) 9'

Hong Kong Stadium
Referee: Francisco González (Uruguay)

5 April 2019
16:30

Hong Kong	14–7	Zimbabwe
Try: Lee 8'c Morrison 11'c Con: Webb (2/2) 9', 12'	Report	Try: O'Neill 2'; Con: Hunduza (1/1) 2'

Hong Kong Stadium
Referee: Tevita Rokovereni (Fiji)

6 April 2019
10:30

Zimbabwe	12–24	Philippines
Try: Tsomondo 1'm Chitokwindo 9'c Con: Rouse 9'	Report	Try: Coveney 2'm Howe 6'c, 10'c Coleman 13'm Con: Fogerty (1/1) 11'; Berry (1/3) 13'

Hong Kong Stadium
Referee: Tevita Rokovereni (Fiji)

6 April 2019
10:52

Hong Kong	19–12	Tonga
Try: Neville 0'c Coverdale 6'c Woodward 8'm Con: Webb (2/3) 0', 7'	Report	Try: Inisi 2'c Osika 5'm Con: Halo (1/2) 2'

Hong Kong Stadium
Referee: Paulo Duarte (Portugal)

==== Pool F ====
Pos	Team	Pld	W	D	L	PF	PA	PD	Pts
1	Ireland	3	2	1	0	85	33	+52	8
2	Russia	3	2	0	1	59	43	+16	7
3	Uruguay	3	1	1	1	64	64	0	6
4	Jamaica	3	0	0	3	22	90	−68	3

5 April 2019
12:14

Russia	26–0	Uruguay
Try: Stepanov 4'c Evseev 6'c Shakirov (2) 9', 11'c Con: Gostyuzhev (3/3) 5', 6', 11'	Report

Hong Kong Stadium
Referee: Craig Evans (Wales)

5 April 2019
12:38

Ireland	26–0	Jamaica
Try: Horan (2) 5'c, 7'c Conroy 6'c O'Donnell 9'm Con: Roche (3/4) 5', 7', 8'	Report

Hong Kong Stadium
Referee: Richard Kelly (New Zealand)

5 April 2019
15:19

Russia	26–10	Jamaica
Try: Lazarenko 1'c Sozonov 3'; Evseev (2) 5'c, 10'c Con: Gostyuzhev (3/3) 1', 6', 10'	Report	Try: Dixon 7'm Facey 14'm Con: Edie (0/1); Osborne (0/1)

Hong Kong Stadium
Referee: Nehuén Jauri-Rivero (Argentina)

5 April 2019
15:43

Ireland	26–26	Uruguay
Try: Kennedy (3) 0'c, 4'c, 6'm Conroy 1'c Con: Roche (3/4) 0', 2', 4'	Report	Try: Alonso 3'c F. Etcheverry (2) 9'c, 12'c Ardao 13'm Con: F. Etcheverry (3/3) 4', 10', 13'; Ubilla (0/1)

Hong Kong Stadium
Referee: Jordan Way (Australia)

6 April 2019
9:44

Uruguay	38–12	Jamaica
Try: T. Etcheverry (2) 0'm, 7'c Alonso (2) 1'm, 7'c Ubilla 9'c Ardao 11'c Con: F. Etcheverry (3/5) 7', 7', 10'; Schmidt-Liermann (1/1) 11'	Report	Try: Dixon 6'm Facey 13'c Con: Stoppani (1/1) 13'

Hong Kong Stadium
Referee: Nehuén Jauri-Rivero (Argentina)

6 April 2019
10:08

Ireland	33–7	Russia
Try: Conroy (3) 2'm, 10'c, 13'c Leavy 7'c O'Shea 8'c Con: Dardis (3/4) 7', 9', 11'; Roche (1/1) 13'	Report	Try: Khlutkov 4'c Con: Gostyuzhev (1/1) 5'

Hong Kong Stadium
Referee: Damián Schneider (Argentina)

==== Pool G ====
Pos	Team	Pld	W	D	L	PF	PA	PD	Pts
1	Germany	3	3	0	0	48	26	+22	9
2	Chile	3	2	0	1	71	31	+40	7
3	Uganda	3	1	0	2	48	76	−28	5
4	Cook Islands	3	0	0	3	36	70	−34	3

5 April 2019
11:30

Germany	19–12	Uganda
Try: Dawe 1'c Lichtenberg 8'c Fromm 13'm Con: Heimpel (2/3) 1', 8'	Report	Try: Kisiga (2) 5'm, 7'c Con: Wokorach (1/2) 7'

Hong Kong Stadium
Referee: Francisco González (Uruguay)

5 April 2019
11:52

Chile	31–5	Cook Islands
Try: Neira 0'c Brangier (2) 2'c, 5'm Fernández 7'm De Vidts 10'c Con: Fernández (2/4) 1', 2'; Videla (1/1) 11'	Report	Try: Karati 6'm Con: Koteka (0/1)

Hong Kong Stadium
Referee: Tevita Rokovereni (Fiji)

5 April 2019
14:35

Germany	10–7	Cook Islands
Try: Dawe 5'm Brechenmacher 12'm Con: Heimpel (0/1); Himmer (0/1)	Report	Try: Willis 9'c Con: Koteka (1/1) 9'

Hong Kong Stadium
Referee: Matt Rodden (Hong Kong)

5 April 2019
14:57

Chile	33–7	Uganda
Try: Silva 0'c Fernández (2) 2'c, 10'c Metuaze 9'm Videla 12'c Con: Fernández (3/4) 1', 3', 11'; Videla (1/1) 13'	Report	Try: Okorach 6'c Con: Wokorach (1/1) 6'

Hong Kong Stadium
Referee: Damián Schneider (Argentina)

6 April 2019
9:00

Uganda	29–24	Cook Islands
Try: Wokorach (2) 3'm, 14'm Oketayot 5'c Aredo 7'm Okorach 8'c Con: Wokorach (2/5) 6', 8'	Report	Try: Ravula (2) 0'c, 11'm Koroitkana 2'm Matapakia 12'c Con: Koteka (2/4) 1', 12'

Hong Kong Stadium
Referee: Francisco González (Uruguay)

6 April 2019
9:22

Chile	7–19	Germany
Try: Metuaze 5'c Con: Fernández (1/1) 6'	Report	Try: Himmer 1'm Fromm 7'c Lichtenberg 12'c Con: Himmer (1/2) 8'; Heimpel (1/1) 12'

Hong Kong Stadium
Referee: Jérémy Rozier (France)

=== Knockout stage ===
Quarter-finals
6 April 2019 – 18:06 – Hong Kong Stadium
Germany	12
Uruguay	7
6 April 2019 – 18:28 – Hong Kong Stadium
Ireland	47
Russia	0
6 April 2019 – 18:50 – Hong Kong Stadium
Chile	15
Tonga	12
6 April 2019 – 19:12 – Hong Kong Stadium
Hong Kong	17
Philippines	7

Semi-finals
7 April 2019 – 12:32 – Hong Kong Stadium
Germany	10
Ireland	19
7 April 2019 – 12:54 – Hong Kong Stadium
Chile	5
Hong Kong	7

Final – World Series qualifier
7 April 2019 – 16:30 – Hong Kong Stadium
Ireland	28
Hong Kong	7

Matches

Quarter-finals

6 April 2019
18:06

Germany	12–7	Uruguay
Try: Himmer 9'm Lichtenberg 14'c Con: Himmer (1/2) 14'	Report	Try: Alonso 11'c Con: F. Etcheverry (1/1) 11'

Hong Kong Stadium
Referee: Nehuén Jauri-Rivero (Argentina)

6 April 2019
18:28

Ireland	47–0	Russia
Try: Kennedy (2) 0'c, 11'm Conroy (2) 1'c, 6'c McNulty 4'c O'Shea (2) 12'c, 14'c Con: Dardis (6/7) 0', 2', 4', 6', 13', 14'	Report

Hong Kong Stadium
Referee: Craig Evans (Wales)

6 April 2019
18:50

Chile	15–12	Tonga
Try: Blanc (2) 4'm, 11'm Fernández 6'm Con: Fernández (0/3)	Report	Try: Sunia 10'm Fotofili 14'c Con: Halo (1/2) 14'

Hong Kong Stadium
Referee: Tevita Rokovereni (Fiji)

6 April 2019
19:12

Hong Kong	17–7	Philippines
Try: Yiu 7'c Webb 8'm T. McQueen 11'; Con: Webb (1/3) 7'	Report	Try: Howe 6'c Con: Berry (1/1) 6'

Hong Kong Stadium
Referee: Francisco González (Uruguay)

Semi-finals

7 April 2019
12:32

Germany	10–19	Ireland
Try: Biniak 7'm Lichtenberg 9'm Con: Himmer (0/1); Heimpel (0/1); Pen: Heimpel (0/1)	Report	Try: Conroy (2) 7'm, 13'c Dardis 12'c Con: Dardis (2/3) 12', 14'

Hong Kong Stadium
Referee: Richard Kelly (New Zealand)

7 April 2019
12:54

Chile	5–7	Hong Kong
Try: Urroz 3'm Con: Fernández (0/1)	Report	Try: Yiu 6'c Con: Webb (1/1) 7'

Hong Kong Stadium
Referee: Jordan Way (Australia)

Final – World Series qualifier

7 April 2019
16:30

Ireland	28–7	Hong Kong
Try: McNulty 2'c O'Shea 7'c Conroy 7'c Kennedy 13'c Con: Dardis (3/3) 3', 7', 8', 13'	Report	Try: T. McQueen 12'c Con: Hood (1/1) 12'

Hong Kong Stadium
Referee: Craig Evans (Wales)

=== Overall record ===
Pos	Team	Wn/Ls	Pts Dif
1	Ireland	5–1–0	+124
2	Hong Kong	5–1	+21
3	Germany	4–1	+18
4	Chile	3–2	+41
5	Tonga	2–2	+26
6	Russia	2–2	–31
7	Uruguay	1–1–2	–5
8	Philippines	1–3	–33

== See also ==
- 2019 Hong Kong Women's Sevens

World Sevens Series XX
Preceded by 2019 Canada Sevens	2019 Hong Kong Sevens	Succeeded by 2019 Singapore Sevens
Hong Kong Sevens
Preceded by 2018 Hong Kong Sevens	2019 Hong Kong Sevens	Succeeded by 2020 Hong Kong Sevens
