= 2019 Singapore Sevens =

- Sevens World Series XX
- Host nation: Singapore
- Date: 13–14 April 2019

Cup
- Champion: South Africa
- Runner-up: Fiji
- Third: England

Challenge
- Winner: France

Tournament details
- Matches played: 45
- Tries scored: 282 (average 6.27 per match)
- Most points: Daniel Taabu (57)
- Most tries: Max McFarland (9)

The 2019 Singapore Sevens was a rugby sevens tournament played at the National Stadium in Singapore on 13–14 April 2019. It was the eighth edition of the Singapore Sevens and the eighth tournament of the 2018–19 World Rugby Sevens Series.

In the cup final, it was South Africa who took out their second Singapore title after they defeated Fiji by a single point. Third was England after they defeated United States by 21 points. France won the challenge trophy after defeating Scotland in the final.

== Background ==
The Singapore Sevens is the eighth time that the Singapore event has been held with the seventh being in a World Series event. After winning the Hong Kong Sevens for the fifth consecutive time in the previous round, Fiji jumped past New Zealand to be in second place on the table. The United States still had the lead in the series but it was lowered down to only a seven-point gap between them and second place. For those two nations, depending on the results from the weekend they had a chance to book their spot at the 2020 Summer Olympics in Tokyo. Fourth place is South Africa with 99 points who hold a nine-point advantage over England.

== Format ==
Sixteen teams are drawn into four pools of four teams each. Each team plays all the others in their pool once. The top two teams from each pool advance to the Cup quarter finals. The bottom two teams from each group advance to the Challenge Trophy quarter finals.

== Teams ==
Fifteen core teams played in the tournament along with one invitational team, runner-up of the 2018 Asia Rugby Sevens Series, Hong Kong:

- Argentina
- Australia
- Canada
- England
- Fiji
- France
- Hong Kong
- Japan
- Kenya
- New Zealand
- Samoa
- Scotland
- South Africa
- Spain
- United States
- Wales

== Pool stage ==
All times in Singapore Standard Time (UTC+08:00).

=== Pool A ===
Team	Pld	W	D	L	PF	PA	PD	Pts
South Africa	3	3	0	0	89	17	+72	9
Fiji	3	1	0	2	69	48	+21	5
Scotland	3	1	0	2	39	81	–42	5
Canada	3	1	0	2	45	96	–51	5

13 April 2019
12:14

South Africa	36–10	Scotland
Try: Du Preez 3'm Kok 5'c Visser 8'c Soyizwapi (2) 9'c, 11'm Davids 12'm Con: Du Preez (2/3) 5', 8'; S. Davids (1/3) 9'	Report	Try: McFarland (2) 1'm, 7'm Con: Lowe (0/2)

National Stadium
Referee: Richard Kelly (New Zealand)

13 April 2019
12:36

Fiji	50–12	Canada
Try: Dranisinukula 1'c Derenalagi 4'm Mocenacagi 6'c Tuimaba (2) 8'c, 10'c Vakurunabili 11'c Cakaubalavu (2) 12'm, 14'; Con: Ikanikoda (5/7) 1', 7', 9', 10', 11'; Bolaca (0/1)	Report	Try: Mullins 2'c Jones 13'm Con: Hirayama (1/2) 2'

National Stadium
Referee: Sam Grove-White (Scotland)

13 April 2019
15:40

South Africa	36–0	Canada
Try: Geduld 4'm Oosthuizen 7'm Soyizwapi 7'm Arendse (2) 9'c, 11'c Makata 10'c Con: Du Preez (1/4) 9'; S. Davids 11', 12'	Report

National Stadium
Referee: Craig Evans (Wales)

13 April 2019
16:02

Fiji	12–19	Scotland
Try: Tuimaba (2) 3'm, 8'; Con: Ikanikoda (1/2) 8'	Report	Try: McFarland (2) 2'm, 13'c Bryce 6'c Con: Lowe (2/3) 7', 14'

National Stadium
Referee: Jordan Way (Australia)

13 April 2019
19:06

Scotland	10–33	Canada
Try: Farndale 2'm Pecqueur 13'm Con: Lowe (0/1); Elms (0/1)	Report	Try: Thiel (2) 1'c, 6'c Jones 4'c Hirayama 9'c Berna 14'm Con: Braid (2/2) 1', 6'; Jones (1/1) 5'; Hirayama (1/2) 9'

National Stadium
Referee: Matt Rodden (Hong Kong)

13 April 2019
19:28

Fiji	7–17	South Africa
Try: Ikanikoda 9'; Con: Botitu 9'c	Report	Try: Gans 6'm Arendse 10'c Con: S. Davids (1/1) 11'; Du Preez (0/1)

National Stadium
Referee: James Doleman (New Zealand)

=== Pool B ===
Team	Pld	W	D	L	PF	PA	PD	Pts
Australia	3	3	0	0	93	29	+64	9
Argentina	3	2	0	1	67	34	+33	7
France	3	1	0	2	45	50	–5	5
Hong Kong	3	0	0	3	12	104	–92	3

13 April 2019
11:30

Argentina	17–22	Australia
Try: Álvarez 0'm Osadczuk 8'c Gonzalez 9'm Con: Mare (1/3) 9'	Report	Try: Longbottom (2) 2'm, 11'c Kennewell 3'm Pincus 6'm Con: Holland (1/4) 11'

National Stadium
Referee: Craig Evans (Wales)

13 April 2019
11:52

France	26–7	Hong Kong
Try: Siega (2) 2'c, 9'c Villière 5'm Veredamu 7'c Con: Barraque (3/4) 2', 7', 9'	Report	Try: Herbert 14'm Con: Webb (1/1) 14'

National Stadium
Referee: James Doleman (New Zealand)

13 April 2019
14:56

Argentina	31–5	Hong Kong
Try: Bazan Velez (2) 1'm, 2'c Sábato 7'c Moneta 11'm Osadczuk 12'c Con: Mare (1/2) 3'; Revol (1/2) 7'; Vanni (1/1) 13'	Report	Try: Woodward 10'm Con: Hood (0/1)

National Stadium
Referee: Sam Grove-White (Scotland)

13 April 2019
15:18

France	12–24	Australia
Try: Siega (2) 2'm, 6'c Con: Barraque (1/2) 7'	Report	Try: Longbottom 3'c Skelton 4'm Miller 9'c Hutchison 11'm Con: Holland (2/4) 4', 10'

National Stadium
Referee: Richard Kelly (New Zealand)

13 April 2019
18:22

Australia	47–0	Hong Kong
Try: Pietsch 1'c Miller 4'c Longbottom 6'c Connor 7'c Pincus (2) 8'c, 10'c McNamara 13'm Con: Coward (6/7) 1', 4', 6', 7', 9', 10'	Report

National Stadium
Referee: Damián Schneider (Argentina)

13 April 2019
18:44

France	7–19	Argentina
Try: Barraque 14'c Con: Barraque (1/1) 14'	Report	Try: Schulz 1'c Sábato (2) 4'c, 9'm Con: Bazan Velez (1/2) 1'; Mare (1/1) 4'

National Stadium
Referee: Paulo Duarte (Portugal)

=== Pool C ===
Team	Pld	W	D	L	PF	PA	PD	Pts
United States	3	3	0	0	70	33	+37	9
England	3	1	0	2	43	41	+2	5
Wales	3	1	0	2	38	50	–12	5
Kenya	3	1	0	2	40	67	–27	5

13 April 2019
10:44

England	36–7	Kenya
Try: Kerr (2) 0'c, 6'm Norton 3'c Mitchell 8'm Sofolarin 12'm Barden 13'c Con: Edwards (2/3) 1', 13'; Mitchell (1/3) 4'	Report	Try: Mwale 14'c Con: Olindi (1/1) 14'

National Stadium
Referee: Paulo Duarte (Portugal)

13 April 2019
11:06

United States	31–12	Wales
Try: Hughes 4'c Niua (2) 7'c, 7'm Thompson 9'c Isles 13'c Con: Hughes (3/5) 4', 7', 9'	Report	Try: Bagshaw 6'm Davies 12'c Con: Davies (1/1) 12'; Treharne (0/1)

National Stadium
Referee: Matt Rodden (Hong Kong)

13 April 2019
14:12

England	0–12	Wales
	Report	Try: Davies 4'c Devine 10'm Con: Davies (1/1) 5'; Treharne (0/1)

National Stadium
Referee: James Doleman (New Zealand)

13 April 2019
14:34

United States	17–14	Kenya
Try: Isles (2) 4'c, 7'm Hughes 8'm Con: Hughes (1/3) 5'	Report	Try: Taabu (2) 2'c, 11'c Con: Taabu (1/1) 2'; Olindi (1/1) 12'

National Stadium
Referee: Damián Schneider (Argentina)

13 April 2019
17:38

Kenya	19–14	Wales
Try: Onyala 2'c Dennis 6'c Taabu 8'm Con: Taabu (2/3) 2', 7'	Report	Try: Conbeer 3'c Rogers 10'c Con: Davies (1/1) 3'; Treharne (1/1) 10'

National Stadium
Referee: Jordan Way (Australia)

13 April 2019
18:00

United States	22–7	England
Try: Hughes 1'm Stephen Tomasin 3'm Tupuola 7'c Williams 10'; Con: Niua (1/1) 7'; Hughes (0/2)	Report	Try: Norton 5'c Con: Edwards (1/1) 5'

National Stadium
Referee: Richard Kelly (New Zealand)

=== Pool D ===
Team	Pld	W	D	L	PF	PA	PD	Pts
New Zealand	3	3	0	0	120	22	+100	9
Samoa	3	2	0	1	119	45	+74	7
Japan	3	1	0	2	22	105	–81	5
Spain	3	0	0	3	19	110	–91	3

13 April 2019
10:00

New Zealand	43–0	Japan
Try: Ware 0'm, 7'c Nareki 3'c Baker 5'c Knewstubb (2) 7'c, 9'm Ravouvou 13'm Con: Knewstubb (3/6) 4', 7', 8'; Baker (1/1) 5'	Report

National Stadium
Referee: Damián Schneider (Argentina)

13 April 2019
10:22

Samoa	40–14	Spain
Try: Matavao (2) 2'c, 7'c Motuga 6'c Alosio 8'c Afamasaga 9'c Vaili 13'm Con: Alosio (5/6) 2', 6', 7', 8', 9'	Report	Try: Sainz-Trapaga 4'c Jorba 11'c Con: Hernández (2/2) 4', 11'

National Stadium
Referee: Jordan Way (Australia)

13 April 2019
13:28

New Zealand	53–0	Spain
Try: Dickson 2'c Curry 3'm Rokolisoa (2) 5'c, 11'c Nareki 7'c Baker 7'c Ware 9'm Webber 13'm Ravouvou 14'm Con: Baker (2/4) 5', 7'; Mikkelson (1/1) 7'; Knewstubb (1/4) 11'	Report

National Stadium
Referee: Paulo Duarte (Portugal)

13 April 2019
13:50

Samoa	57–5	Japan
Try: Vaili (2) 0'm, 7'c Afamasaga (2) 3'c, 5'm Motuga 6'c Mealoi 9'c Scanlan 12'c Luki 13'm Alofipo 14'c Con: Mealoi (4/5) 3', 7', 7', 9'; Alosio (1/2) 14'; Matavao (0/1)	Report	Try: Hayashi 2'm Con: Sakai (0/1)

National Stadium
Referee: Matt Rodden (Hong Kong)

13 April 2019
16:54

Japan	17–5	Spain
Try: Lisala (2) 5'm, 10'c Toloke 13'm Con: Sakai (1/3) 10'	Report	Try: de Juan 1'm Con: Hernández (0/1)

National Stadium
Referee: Craig Evans (Wales)

13 April 2019
17:16

Samoa	22–26	New Zealand
Try: Matavao 0'm Vaili 2'c Afamasaga (2) 5'm, 7'm Con: Mealoi (1/4) 3'	Report	Try: Ware (2) 7'm, 9'c Mikkelson 11'c Rokolisoa 12'c Con: Knewstubb (1/2) 9'; Baker (2/2) 11', 12'

National Stadium
Referee: Sam Grove-White (Scotland)

== Knockout stage ==
=== Thirteenth place ===
Semi-finals
14 April 2019 – 13:38 – National Stadium
Spain	38
Hong Kong	12
14 April 2019 – 14:00 – National Stadium
Japan	24
Kenya	31

13th place final
14 April 2019 – 17:14 – National Stadium
Spain	5
Kenya	21

Matches

Semifinals

14 April 2019
13:38

Spain	38–12	Hong Kong
Try: Jorba (2) 1'c, 10'm Alonso (2) 3'c, 5'c Ramos 7'c Mata 11'm Con: Hernández (4/4) 1', 3', 6', 7' de Santiago (0/2)		Try: Lee 7'm Herbert 14'c Con: Hood (1/2) 14'

National Stadium
Referee: Damián Schneider (Argentina)

14 April 2019
14:00

Japan	24–31	Kenya
Try: Sakai 4'c Toloke 7'm Lisala (2) 9'm, 11'c Con: Sakai (2/4) 4', 12'		Try: Amonde 1'm Taabu (2) 2'c, 5'c Oluoch (2) 8'm, 14'; Con: Taabu (3/5) 3', 6', 14'

National Stadium
Referee: Matt Rodden (Hong Kong)

13th place final

14 April 2019
17:14

Spain	5–21	Kenya
Try: Alonso 8'm Con: Hernández (0/1)		Try: Onyala 1'c Mwale 5'c Taabu 9'c Con: Taabu (2/2) 1', 5', 10'

National Stadium
Referee: Paulo Duarte (Portugal)

=== Challenge Trophy ===
Quarter-finals
14 April 2019 – 10:00 – National Stadium
Scotland	31
Spain	10
14 April 2019 – 10:22 – National Stadium
Wales	19
Hong Kong	17
14 April 2019 – 10:44 – National Stadium
Japan	14
Canada	33
14 April 2019 – 11:06 – National Stadium
France	24
Kenya	14

Semi-finals
14 April 2019 – 14:22 – National Stadium
Scotland	33
Wales	12
14 April 2019 – 14:44 – National Stadium
Canada	12
France	19

Challenge Trophy final
14 April 2019 – 17:36 – National Stadium
Scotland	19
France	22

Matches

Quarterfinals

14 April 2019
10:00

Scotland	37–10	Spain
Try: McFarland (2) 0'm, 1'c Farndale (2) 5'c, 7'c Pecqueur 11'm Lowe 13'c Con: Lowe (4/6) 1', 5', 7', 14'		Try: Ramos 9'm Sánchez 10'm Con: de Santiago (0/2)

National Stadium
Referee: Jordan Way (Australia)

14 April 2019
10:22

Wales	19–17	Hong Kong
Try: Devine 7'c Goodchild 10'c T. Lewis 14'; Con: Treharne (1/1) 7'; Davies (1/2) 10'		Try: Brien 3'c Yiu 7'm McQueen 8'm Con: Webb (1/3) 3'

National Stadium
Referee: Paulo Duarte (Portugal)

14 April 2019
10:44

Japan	14–33	Canada
Try: Sakai (2) 3'c, 6'c Con: Sakai (1/1) 4', 7'		Try: Braid 0'c Berna 4'c Douglas 9'm Thiel 11'c Hirayama 13'c Con: Hirayama (4/5) 1', 5', 12', 14'

National Stadium
Referee: Sam Grove-White (Scotland)

14 April 2019
11:06

France	24–14	Kenya
Try: Barraque (2) 0'c, 4'c Siega 7'm Callendret 12'; Con: Barraque (1/3) 1'; Iraguha (1/1) 4'		Try: Mwale 6'c Taabu 11'c Con: Taabu (2/2) 7', 11'

National Stadium
Referee: Damián Schneider (Argentina)

Semifinals

14 April 2019
14:22

Scotland	33–12	Wales
Try: McFarland (2) 1'm, 7'c Lowe (2) 3'c, 5'c Nayacavou 10'c Con: Lowe (4/5) 3', 5', 7', 11'		Try: Cambriani (2) 12'c, 13'm Con: Treharne (1/2) 12'

National Stadium
Referee: Paulo Duarte (Portugal)

14 April 2019
14:44

Canada	12–19	France
Try: Hirayama 0'c Braid 7'c Con: Hirayama (1/2) 1'		Try: Iraguha 6'c Siega 10'c Veredamu 13'; Con: Barraque (2/3) 6', 11'

National Stadium
Referee: Richard Kelly (New Zealand)

Challenge Trophy final

14 April 2019
17:36

Scotland	19–22	France
Try: McFarland 2'c Fergusson 6'c Farndale 12'm Con: Lowe (2/3) 2', 7'		Try: Villière (2) 0'm, 3'm Veredamu (2) 8'c, 14'; Con: Barraque (1/4) 8'

National Stadium
Referee: Matt Rodden (Hong Kong)

=== 5th place ===
Semi-finals
14 April 2019 – 15:06 – National Stadium
Samoa	14
Argentina	12
14 April 2019 – 15:28 – National Stadium
New Zealand	^{27}_{(a.e.t.)}
Australia	22

5th place final
14 April 2019 – 18:11 – National Stadium
Samoa	19
New Zealand	17

Matches

Semifinals

14 April 2019
15:06

Samoa	14–12	Argentina
Try: Mealoi 6'c Scanlan 9'c Con: Mealoi (1/1) 7', 9'		Try: Barbier 3'm Osadczuk 13'c Con: Bazan Velez (1/1) 13'; Revol (0/1)

National Stadium
Referee: Jordan Way (Australia)

14 April 2019
15:28

New Zealand	27–22 (a.e.t.)	Australia
Try: Ravouvou (2) 1'm, 5'; Webber 2'm Nareki 10'c Mikkelson 15'; Con: Rokolisoa (1/4) 6'		Try: Skelton 4'; Coward 7'm Longbottom (2) 8'm, 12'; Con: Coward (1/1) 12'; Holland (0/3)

National Stadium

5th place final

14 April 2019
18:11

Samoa	19–17	New Zealand
Try: Vaili (2) 2'c, 14'; Alosio 5'c Con: Mealoi (1/1) 3'; Alosio (1/2) 5'		Try: Ravouvou (2) 0'c, 11'm Dickson 8'm Con: Knewstubb (1/3) 1'

National Stadium
Referee: Damián Schneider (Argentina)

=== Cup ===
Quarter-finals
14 April 2019 – 11:30 – National Stadium
South Africa	21
Samoa	12
14 April 2019 – 11:52 – National Stadium
United States	12
Argentina	10
14 April 2019 – 12:14 – National Stadium
New Zealand	5
Fiji	19
14 April 2019 – 12:36 – National Stadium
Australia	19
England	31

Semi-finals
14 April 2019 – 15:50 – National Stadium
South Africa	24
United States	12
14 April 2019 – 16:12 – National Stadium
Fiji	26
England	12

Cup final
14 April 2019 – 19:00 – National Stadium
South Africa	20
Fiji	19
Bronze medal match
14 April 2019 – 18:35 – National Stadium
United States	7
England	28

Matches

Quarterfinals

14 April 2019
11:30

South Africa	21–12	Samoa
Try: Visser 6'c Geduld 8'c S. Davids 10'c Con: Du Preez (1/1) 7'; S. Davids		Try: Matavao (2) 2'm, 4'; Con: Mealoi (1/2) 4'

National Stadium
Referee: James Doleman (New Zealand)

14 April 2019
11:52

United States	12–10	Argentina
Try: Leuta 4'c Tomasin 7'; Con: Hughes (1/2) 5'		Try: Mare (2) 0'm, 2'm Con: Mare (0/2)

National Stadium
Referee: Craig Evans (Wales)

14 April 2019
12:14

New Zealand	5–19	Fiji
Try: Mikkelson 1'm Con: Knewstubb (0/1)		Try: Vakurunabili 2'm Ikanikoda 5'c Botitu 8'c Con: Ikanikoda (2/3) 5', 8'

National Stadium
Referee: Matt Rodden (Rugby)

14 April 2019
12:36

Australia	19–31	England
Try: Kennewell (2) 3', 5'; Holland 12'c Con: Holland (2/3) 5', 12'		Try: Kerr (2) 0'c, 2'm de Carpentier 6'c Norton 8'm Mitchell 10'c Con: Edwards (3/5) 1', 7', 10'

National Stadium
Referee: Richard Kelly (New Zealand)

Semifinals

14 April 2019
15:50

South Africa	24–12	United States
Try: Soyizwapi 0'c Gans 4'm Visser 10'm Penalty try 12'; Con: Du Preez (1/2) 1'; S. Davids (0/1)		Try: Tomasin 8'm Schroeder 14'c Con: Hughes (1/2) 14'

National Stadium
Referee: Craig Evans (Wales)

14 April 2019
16:12

Fiji	19–12	England
Try: Vakurunabili (2) 0'm, 3'c Mocenacagi 13'c Con: Ikanikoda (1/2) 4'; Bolaca (1/1) 13'		Try: Glover 8'm Olowofela 10'c Con: Mitchell (1/1) 10'; Edwards (0/1)

National Stadium
Referee: James Doleman (New Zealand)

Bronze medal match

14 April 2019
18:35

United States	7–28	England
Try: Tupuola 3'c Con: Tomasin (1/1) 3'		Try: Norton 5'c Edwards 7'c Glover 10'c Ellery 11'c Con: Edwards (2/2) 5', 7', 10'; Mitchell (1/1) 12'

National Stadium
Referee: Jordan Way (Australia)

Cup final

14 April 2019
19:00

South Africa	20–19	Fiji
Try: Arendse 9'm A. Davids 10'm Oosthuizen 11'c Con: S. Davids (1/3) 11'; Pen: S. Davids (1/1) 13'		Try: Tuimaba 1'c Bolaca 4'm Botitu 6'; Con: Bolaca (2/3) 2', 6'

National Stadium
Referee: Richard Kelly (New Zealand)

== Tournament placings ==
Place	Team	Points
1st place, gold medalist(s)	South Africa	22
2nd place, silver medalist(s)	Fiji	19
3rd place, bronze medalist(s)	England	17
4	United States	15
5	Samoa	13
6	New Zealand	12
7	Argentina	10
7	Australia	10

Place	Team	Points
9	France	8
10	Scotland	7
11	Canada	5
11	Wales	5
13	Kenya	3
14	Spain	2
15	Hong Kong	1
15	Japan	1

Source: World Rugby

== Players ==
=== Scoring leaders ===
Tries scored
Rank	Player	Tries
1	Max McFarland	9
2	Daniel Taabu	7
3	Joe Ravouvou	6
3	Johnny Vaili	6
3	Maurice Longbottom	6
3	Remi Siega	6

Points scored
Rank	Player	Points
1	Daniel Taabu	57
2	Max McFarland	45
3	Gavin Lowe	39
4	Jean-Pascal Barraque	33
5	4 players	30

Source: World Rugby

=== Dream Team ===
The following seven players were selected to the tournament Dream Team at the conclusion of the tournament:

Forwards	Backs
Josua Vakurunabili; Meli Derenalagi; Vilimoni Botitu	Werner Kok; Aminiasi Tuimaba; Justin Geduld; Max McFarland

World Sevens Series XX
Preceded by 2019 Hong Kong Sevens	2019 Singapore Sevens	Succeeded by 2019 London Sevens
Singapore Sevens
Preceded by 2018 Singapore Sevens	2019 Singapore Sevens	Succeeded by 2022 Singapore Sevens
