= Siosifa =

Siosifa is a Tongan masculine given name. It may refer to:

- Siosifa Lisala (born 1994), Tongan-born Japanese rugby union player
- Siosifa Talakai (born 1997), Australian rugby league player
- Siosifa Tuʻitupou Tuʻutafaiva, Tongan lawyer and politician
