= 2018 South Africa Sevens =

- Sevens World Series XX
- Host nation: South Africa
- Date: 8–9 December 2018

Cup
- Champion: Fiji
- Runner-up: United States
- Third: South Africa

Challenge Trophy
- Winner: Argentina

Tournament details
- Matches played: 45
- Tries scored: 293 (average 6.51 per match)
- Most points: Francisco Hernández (45)
- Most tries: Franco Sábato (7)

The 2018 South Africa Sevens was the second tournament within the 2018–19 World Rugby Sevens Series and the twentieth edition of the South Africa Sevens. It was held on 8–9 December 2018 at Cape Town Stadium in Cape Town, South Africa.

== Format ==
The teams were drawn into four pools of four teams each. Each team played every other team in their pool once. The top two teams from each pool advanced to the Cup brackets where teams competed for the Gold, Silver, and bronze medals. The bottom two teams from each group went to the playoffs in the Challenge Trophy brackets.

== Teams ==
Fifteen core teams are participating in the tournament along with one invited team, 2018 Africa Men's Sevens winners Zimbabwe:

- Argentina
- Australia
- Canada
- England
- Fiji
- France
- Japan
- Kenya
- New Zealand
- Samoa
- Scotland
- South Africa
- Spain
- United States
- Wales
- Zimbabwe

== Pool stage ==
All times in South African Standard Time (UTC+2:00)

Key to colours in group tables
Teams that advanced to the Cup Quarterfinal

=== Pool A ===
Team	Pld	W	D	L	PF	PA	PD	Pts
South Africa	3	2	0	1	86	38	+48	7
New Zealand	3	2	0	1	78	42	+36	7
Samoa	3	2	0	1	66	51	+15	7
Zimbabwe	3	0	0	3	12	111	−99	3

8 December 2018
12:27

South Africa	22–12	Samoa
Try: Brown 6'; Snyman 8'; Geduld 9'; Visser 12'; Con: Geduld 13'		Try: Afamasaga 2'; Vaili 15'; Con: Tupou 2'

Cape Town Stadium
Referee: James Doleman

8 December 2018
12:49

New Zealand	35–0	Zimbabwe
Try: Knewstubb 4'; Gregory 8', 12'; Masirewa 11', 14'; Con: Knewstubb 4', 9'; Koroi 11', 12'; McGarvey Black 14'

Cape Town Stadium
Referee: Damian Schneider

8 December 2018
15:48

South Africa	43–0	Zimbabwe
Try: Soyizwapi 1', 6', 14'; Specman 5'; Brown 8'; Geduld 8'; Visser 12'; Con: Geduld 1', 5', 9'; Du Preez 8'

Cape Town Stadium
Referee: Jeremy Rozier

8 December 2018
16:10

New Zealand	17–21	Samoa
Try: Molia 4', 13'; Ng Shiu 7'; Con: Knewstubb 4'		Try: Motuga 2'; Afamasaga 10'; Mealoi 15'; Con: Tupou 2'; Tusitala 10'; Mealoi 15'

Cape Town Stadium
Referee: Rasta Rasivhenge

8 December 2018
19:34

Samoa	33–12	Zimbabwe
Try: Afamasaga 1', 11'; Alofipo 4'; Tusitala 5'; Motuga 15'; Con: Tupou 2', 5'; Alosio 11'; R Ene 15'		Try: Hunduza 7'; Chitokwindo 9'; Con: Hunduza 7'

Cape Town Stadium
Referee: Paulo Duarte

8 December 2018
19:56

New Zealand	26–21	South Africa
Try: Knewstubb 7'; Molia 10', 14'; Koroi 17'; Con: Knewstubb 7', 15'; Koroi 11'		Try: Specman 5'; Kok 10'; Du Preez 13'; Con: Geduld 6', 10', 13'

Cape Town Stadium
Referee: Damon Murphy

=== Pool B ===
Team	Pld	W	D	L	PF	PA	PD	Pts
United States	3	3	0	0	123	31	92	9
Spain	3	2	0	1	104	50	54	7
Argentina	3	1	0	2	61	73	−12	5
Japan	3	0	0	3	7	141	−134	3

8 December 2018
11:43

Argentina	12–35	Spain
Try: Carreras 4'; Sabato 8'; Con: Mare 4'		Try: Carrion 6', 14'; Fontes 9', 11'; Pla 13'; Con: Hernandez 6', 9', 11', 13', 15'

Cape Town Stadium
Referee: Jeremy Rozler

8 December 2018
12:05

United States	54–0	Japan
Try: Iosefo 1'; Baker 2'; Hughes; Tomasin 6', 10'; Thompson 9'; Leuta 11'; Isles 15'; Con: Tomasin 2', 5', 7', 10', 10', 12'; Hughes 4'

Cape Town Stadium
Referee: Matt Rodden

8 December 2018
15:04

Argentina	35–7	Japan
Try: Carreras 2'; Bazan Velez 5'; F Sabato 7'; M Moroni 8'; L Gonzalez 9'; Con: Bazan Velez 3'; Revol 5', 8', 8', 10'		Try: Noguchi 12'; Con: Sakai 12'

Cape Town Stadium
Referee: Paulo Duarte

8 December 2018
15:26

United States	38–17	Spain
Try: Williams 2'; Tomasin 6', 12'; Barrett 11'; Isles 14'; Brown 16'; Con: Tomasin 2', 7'; Hughes 11', 15'		Try: Rodriguez-Guerra 3'; Losada 4'; Poggi 9'; Con: Hernandez 4'

Cape Town Stadium
Referee: Damian Schneider

8 December 2018
18:50

Spain	52–0	Japan
Try: Pla 1', 6'; Hernandez 4', 9'; Losada 5'; Poggi 8'; Sainz-Trapaga Devoto 11'; Alonso 13'; Con: Hernandez 1', 4', 7', 8', 9', 12'

Cape Town Stadium
Referee: Richard Haughton

8 December 2018
19:12

United States	31–14	Argentina
Try: Williams 3'; Hughes 8'; Iosefo 10'; Leuta 11'; Baker 14'; Con: Hughes 3', 10', 15'		Try: Saboato 5'; Cinti Luna 7'; Con: Revol 6'

Cape Town Stadium
Referee: James Doleman

=== Pool C ===
Team	Pld	W	D	L	PF	PA	PD	Pts
Fiji	3	3	0	0	109	26	83	9
England	3	2	0	1	74	45	29	7
France	3	1	0	2	31	88	−57	5
Kenya	3	0	0	3	31	86	−55	3

8 December 2018
10:59

Fiji	50–0	France
Try: Nacuqu 4'; Tuimaba 5', 9'; Botitu 8'; Nasoko 10'; Naduva 11'; Tuwai 13', 16'; Con: Nacuqu 4', 12', 16'; Ravouvou 6', 9'

Cape Town Stadium
Referee: Rasta Rasivhenge

8 December 2018
11:21

England	29–12	Kenya
Try: Waddleton 1'; Norton 7', 9', 13'; Burgess 14'; Con: Mitchell 2', 14'		Try: Kuto 4'; Mugaisi 8'; Con: Agero 4'

Cape Town Stadium
Referee: Damon Murphy

8 December 2018
14:20

Fiji	38–7	Kenya
Try: Derenalagi 1', 10'; Naduva 3', 7'; Nasoko 5'Mocenacagi 8'; Con: Ravouvou 1', 5'; Nacuqu 9'; Botitu 10'		Try: Onyala 12'; Con: Agero 12'

Cape Town Stadium
Referee: Richard Haughton

8 December 2018
14:42

England	26–12	France
Try: Mitchell 5'; Norton 10'; Muir 12'; Olowofela 14'; Con: Mitchell 10', 12', 14'		Try: Huyard 3', 7'; Con: Riva 8'

Cape Town Stadium
Referee: James Doleman

8 December 2018
17:41

France	19–12	Kenya
Try: Mazzoleni 4'; Bouhraoua 7'; Riva 13'; Con: Riva 8'; Barraque 14'		Try: Otiero 2', 9'; Con: Agero 9'

Cape Town Stadium
Referee: Matt Rodden

8 December 2018
18:03

England	19–21	Fiji
Try: Muir 8', 14'; Davis 14'; Con: Bibby 8'; Mitchell 14'		Try: Derenalagi 2'; Tuimaba 4'; Tuwai 12'; Con: Botitu 3'; Ravouvou 4'; Nacuqu 13'

Cape Town Stadium
Referee: Jeremy Rozier

=== Pool D ===
Team	Pld	W	D	L	PF	PA	PD	Pts
Australia	3	3	0	0	76	43	33	9
Scotland	3	2	0	1	63	47	16	7
Canada	3	1	0	2	57	57	0	5
Wales	3	0	0	3	28	77	−49	3

8 December 2018
10:15

Scotland	21–14	Canada
Try: Fergusson 2'; Bryce 8'; McFarland 15'; Con: Lowe 2', *' Fergusson 14'		Try: Braid 4'; Kay 9'; Con: Hirayama 4', 10'

Cape Town Stadium
Referee: Richard Haughton

8 December 2018
10:37

Australia	21–14	Wales
Try: Hutchison 5'; Anderson 11'; Longbottom 15'; Con: Porch 6', 12', 16'		Try: Jones 3'; Blacker 13'; Con: Jones 3'; Treherne 14'

Cape Town Stadium
Referee: Paulo Duarte

8 December 2018
13:36

Scotland	28–7	Wales
Try: McFarland 5'; Lowe 7'; Riddell 9'; Nayacavou 12'; Con: Lowe 6', 7', 9'; Fergusson 13'		Try: Jones 16'; Con: Treherne 16'

Cape Town Stadium
Referee: Damon Murphy

8 December 2018
13:58

Australia	29–15	Canada
Try: Porch 1', 7', 10'; Malouf 3', 5'; Con: Porch 4', 5'		Try: Douglas 8', 11'; Hirayama 14'

Cape Town Stadium
Referee: Matt Rodden

8 December 2018
16:57

Canada	28–7	Wales
Try: Douglas 2', 13'; Braid 5'; Mullins 8'; Con: Hirayama 3', 5', 9', 13'		Try: Bagshaw 8'; Con: Treherne 8'

Cape Town Stadium
Referee: Damian Schneider

8 December 2018
17:19

Australia	26–14	Scotland
Try: Longbottom 1'; Parahi 3'; Porch 10'; Con: Porch 2', 4', 10'		Try: Fergusson 8'; Elms 12'; Con: Lowe 9', 12'

Cape Town Stadium
Referee: Rasta Rasivhenge

== Knockout stage ==
=== Thirteenth place ===
Semi-finals
9 December – 13:57 – Cape Town
Wales	28
Japan	7
9 December – 14:19 – Cape Town
Zimbabwe	19
Kenya	31

Thirteenth place
9 December – 17:43 – Cape Town
Wales	26
Kenya	33

Matches

Semi-finals

9 December 2018
13:57

Wales	28–7	Japan

Cape Town Stadium

9 December 2018
14:19

Zimbabwe	19–31	Kenya

Cape Town Stadium

Thirteenth place

9 December 2018
17:43

Wales	26–33	Kenya

Cape Town Stadium

=== Challenge Trophy ===
Quarter-finals
9 December – 10:36 – Cape Town
Samoa	31
Wales	26
9 December – 10:58 – Cape Town
France	31
Japan	0
9 December – 11:20 – Cape Town
Canada	28
Zimbabwe	24
9 December – 11:42 – Cape Town
Argentina	34
Kenya	31

Semi-finals
9 December – 14:41 – Cape Town
Samoa	31
France	7
9 December – 15:03 – Cape Town
Canada	14
Argentina	24

Final
9 December – 18:05 – Cape Town
Samoa	14
Argentina	38

Matches

Quarter-finals

9 December 2018
10:36

Samoa	31–26	Wales

Cape Town Stadium

9 December 2018
10:58

France	31–0	Japan

Cape Town Stadium

9 December 2018
11:20

Canada	28–24	Zimbabwe

Cape Town Stadium

9 December 2018
11:42

Argentina	34–31	Kenya

Cape Town Stadium

Semi-finals

9 December 2018
14:41

Samoa	31–7	France

Cape Town Stadium

9 December 2018
15:03

Canada	14–24	Argentina

Cape Town Stadium

Challenge Trophy Final

9 December 2018
18:05

Samoa	14–38	Argentina

Cape Town Stadium

=== Fifth place ===
Semi-finals
9 December – 15:50 – Cape Town
Scotland	7
Spain	12
9 December – 16:12 – Cape Town
Australia	21
England	24

Fifth place
9 December – 18:36 – Cape Town
Spain	7
England	14

Matches

Semi-finals

9 December 2018
15:50

Scotland	7–12	Spain

Cape Town Stadium

9 December 2018
16:12

Australia	21–24	England

Cape Town Stadium

Fifth place

9 December 2018
18:36

Spain	7–14	England

Cape Town Stadium

=== Cup ===
Quarter-finals
9 December – 12:04 – Cape Town
South Africa	21
Scotland	12
9 December – 12:26 – Cape Town
Fiji	46
Spain	7
9 December – 12:48 – Cape Town
Australia	17
New Zealand	26
9 December – 13:10 – Cape Town
United States	19
England	12

Semi-finals
9 December – 16:34 – Cape Town
South Africa	12
Fiji	17
9 December – 16:56 – Cape Town
New Zealand	12
United States	31

Final
9 December – 19:44 – Cape Town
Fiji	29
United States	15
Bronze final
9 December – 19:18 – Cape Town
South Africa	10
New Zealand	5

Matches

Quarter-finals

9 December 2018
12:04

South Africa	21–12	Scotland

Cape Town Stadium

9 December 2018
12:26

Fiji	46–7	Spain

Cape Town Stadium

9 December 2018
12:48

Australia	17–26	New Zealand

Cape Town Stadium

9 December 2018
13:10

United States	19–12	England

Cape Town Stadium

Semi-finals

9 December 2018
16:34

South Africa	12–17	Fiji

Cape Town Stadium

9 December 2018
16:56

New Zealand	12–31	United States

Cape Town Stadium

Bronze final

9 December 2018
19:18

South Africa	10–5	New Zealand

Cape Town Stadium

Cup final

9 December 2018
19:44

Fiji	29–15	United States

Cape Town Stadium

== Tournament placings ==
Place	Team	Points
1st place, gold medalist(s)	Fiji	22
2nd place, silver medalist(s)	United States	19
3rd place, bronze medalist(s)	South Africa	17
4	New Zealand	15
5	England	13
6	Spain	12
7	Australia	10
7	Scotland	10

Place	Team	Points
9	Argentina	8
10	Samoa	7
11	Canada	5
11	France	5
13	Kenya	3
14	Wales	2
15	Japan	1
15	Zimbabwe	1

Source: World Rugby

== Players ==
=== Scoring leaders ===
Tries scored
Rank	Player	Tries
1	Franco Sábato	7
2	Alamanda Motuga	6
2	Alasio Naduva	6
2	David Afamasaga	6
2	Kalione Nasoko	6

Points scored
Rank	Player	Points
1	Francisco Hernández	45
2	John Porch	44
3	Stephen Tomasin	43
4	Justin Geduld	37
5	Franco Sábato	35

Source: World Rugby

=== Dream Team ===
The following seven players were selected to the tournament Dream Team at the conclusion of the tournament:

Forwards	Backs
(Fiji) Kalione Nasoko (United States) Danny Barrett (Samoa) David Afamasaga	(Fiji) Alasio Naduva (United States) Madison Hughes (New Zealand) Sione Molia (South Africa) Rosko Specman

== See also ==
- World Rugby Sevens Series
- 2018–19 World Rugby Sevens Series
- World Rugby

World Sevens Series XX
Preceded by 2018 Dubai Sevens	2018 South Africa Sevens	Succeeded by 2019 New Zealand Sevens
South Africa Sevens
Preceded by 2017 South Africa Sevens	2018 South Africa Sevens	Succeeded by 2019 South Africa Sevens
