= Adam Leavy =

Irish rugby union player (born 1995)

- Born: 21 September 1995 (age 31) Dublin, Ireland
- Height: 1.85 m (6 ft 1 in)
- Weight: 91 kg (201 lb)

Rugby union career
National sevens team
Years	Team	Comps
2017-Present	Ireland 7s	
- Correct as of 26 July 2021

Adam Leavy (born 21 September 1995) is a rugby union player. He plays for the Ireland national rugby sevens team as a forward.

Leavy debuted for the Ireland sevens team at the Exeter leg of the 2017 Rugby Europe Sevens Grand Prix Series. Leavy represented Ireland at the 2018 Paris Sevens, helping Ireland notch wins against core teams Australia and Spain to finish in seventh place. Leavy played for Ireland at the 2019 Hong Kong Sevens qualifier, helping Ireland win the qualifying tournament and gain a place as a core team for the 2019-20 World Rugby Sevens Series. Leavy also played at the 2019 London Sevens, helping Ireland secure wins against core teams England, Scotland, and Canada to finish in sixth.

Leavy has also played rugby fifteens. As a schoolboy, Leavy played rugby for St Michael's College, Dublin. Playing as a wing, Leavy was a member of the Connacht Rugby academy and also played for Lansdowne in the All-Ireland League.

Leavy was a member of the Ireland national rugby sevens team that qualified for the 2020 Summer Olympics.

Adam is a brother of Leinster flanker, Dan Leavy.
