= Raef Morrison =

- Born: Raef Morrison; 1995 (age 30–31) Hong Kong
- Height: 6'1
- Weight: 88 kg (194 lb)
- School: West Island School
- University: Edinburgh University

Rugby union career
- Position: Forwards / Back Row Forward
- Current team: Hong Kong Football Club
Senior career
Years	Team	Apps	(Points)
	Hong Kong Football Club	55	(110)
International career
Years	Team	Apps	(Points)
4	Hong Kong	14	(315)
National sevens team
Years	Team		Comps
2014–	Hong Kong 7s		

Raef Morrison (born 1995) is a Hong Kong rugby union player. https://www.itsrugby.co.uk/players/raef-morrison-31722.html https://add-victor.com/knowledge-hub/blog/blogs/hong-kong-rugby-player-raef-morrison-makes-the-move-to-london-to-begin-his-career-in-sustainable-finance

== Career ==
Morrison plays for the Hong Kong national rugby sevens team.
