= Riaan O'Neill =

Zimbabwean rugby union player (born 1994)

- Born: Riaan Bryden O'Neill; 24 May 1994 (age 32) Hwange, Zimbabwe
- Height: 1.78 m (5 ft 10 in)
- Weight: 95 kg (15.0 st; 209 lb)

Rugby union career
- Position: Fly-half / Centre / Wing / Fullback
Senior career
Years	Team	Apps	(Points)
2019	Zimbabwe Academy	3	(0)
2022–	Zimbabwe Goshawks	1	(0)
- Correct as of 23 April 2022
International career
Years	Team	Apps	(Points)
2016–	Zimbabwe	5	(10)
- Correct as of 23 April 2022
National sevens team
Years	Team		Comps
2015–	Zimbabwe Sevens		8
- Correct as of 23 April 2022

Riaan O'Neill (born 24 May 1994) is a Zimbabwe rugby union player, currently playing for the Zimbabwe Goshawks in the 2022 Currie Cup First Division. His preferred position is fly-half, centre, wing or fullback.

== Professional career ==
O'Neill represented Zimbabwe Academy in the 2019 Rugby Challenge. He was then named in the Zimbabwe Goshawks squad for the 2022 Currie Cup First Division. O'Neill is a Zimbabwean international in both 15-a-side and sevens.
