= Livai Ikanikoda =

Fijian rugby sevens player (born 1989)

- Date of birth: 30 October 1989 (age 35)
- Height: 175 cm (5 ft 9 in)
- Weight: 93 kg (205 lb; 14 st 9 lb)

Rugby union career
Senior career
Years	Team	Apps	(Points)
–	Fiji Police Rugby 7s		()

Livai Ikanikoda (born 30 October 1989) is a Fijian rugby sevens player who plays in the Fiji national rugby sevens team. He plays in the playmaker position. Ikanikoda made his debut for Fiji in the 2011-2012 HSBC 7s series. After an absence of eight years from the Fiji national rugby sevens team due to a major leg injury, he played a critical role in the playmakers position that resulted in Fiji winning the 2019 Hong Kong Sevens, its fifth consecutive Hong Kong 7s title.
