= Stephen Parez =

French rugby union player

- Full name: Stephen Parez-Edo Martin
- Born: 1 August 1994 (age 32) Paris, France
- Height: 1.74 m (5 ft 9 in)
- Weight: 80 kg (176 lb)

Rugby union career
- Position: Wing
International career
Years	Team	Apps	(Points)
- France U-20
National sevens team
Years	Team		Comps
- France
Medal record
Men's rugby sevens
Representing France
Olympic Games
Gold medal – first place	2024 Paris	Team competition

Stephen Parez-Edo Martin (born 1 August 1994) is a French rugby sevens player. He competed for France 7s at the 2016 Summer Olympics. In 2013 he played in the U-20 Six Nations Championship and the IRB Junior World Championship.

Parez has also taken part in other sports such as Athletics, Taekwondo and Swimming. He competed for France at the 2022 Rugby World Cup Sevens in Cape Town.

He was part of the French sevens side that won the gold medal at the 2024 Summer Olympics in Paris.

== Personal life ==
Parez was born in France and is of Spanish descent through his father. He moved to Madrid, Spain for 3 years at the age of 7.
