= Kameli Soejima =

Fijian rugby union player

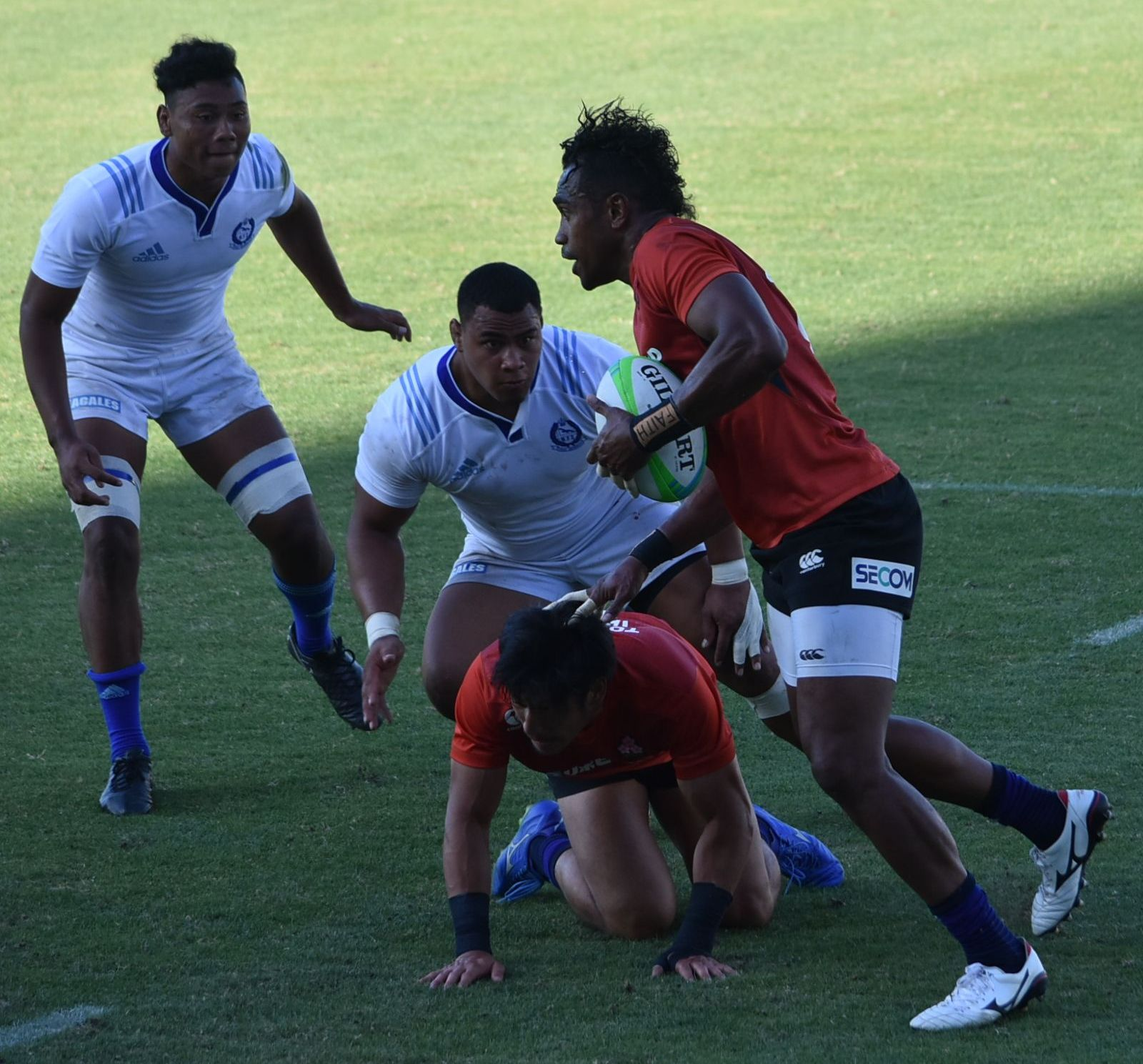
- Full name: Kameli Raravou Latianara Soejima
- Born: June 1, 1983 (age 43) Nasekula, Labasa, Fiji
- Height: 1.90 m (6 ft 3 in)
- Weight: 92 kg (203 lb; 14 st 7 lb)

Rugby union career
- Position: Wing
Senior career
Years	Team	Apps	(Points)
2016–2021	Coca-Cola Red Sparks	10	(40)
National sevens team
Years	Team		Comps
2014–2023	Japan Sevens		28

Kameli Soejima (副島 亀里, Soejima Kameli, born June 1, 1983) is a Fijian born Japanese rugby union player. He represents Japan in rugby sevens and made his debut at the 2014 Dubai Sevens. He was Japan's top try-scorer in the 2015–16 World Rugby Sevens Series, and also one of their top try-scorers in the 2014–15 season.

Soejima was selected for the Japanese sevens squad to the 2016 Summer Olympics in Brazil.
