= Johnny Vaili =

- Full name: John Vaili
- Born: 7 June 1995 (age 31)
- Height: 6 ft 4 in (193 cm)
- Weight: 183 lb (83 kg)

Rugby union career
- Position: Back
International career
Years	Team	Apps	(Points)
2019–	Samoa	2	(0)
Medal record
Rugby sevens
Representing Samoa
Pacific Games
Silver medal – second place	2019 Apia	Men's tournament

John Vaili (born 7 June 1995) is a Samoan international rugby union player.

An outside back, Vaili has gained most of his Samoa caps in rugby sevens. He won the Impact player award for his performance in the 2019 Singapore Sevens and made two appearances that year with the Samoa XV. His international career has since stalled due to disciplinary issues. Following a six-month rugby ban in 2020 for damaging property, Vaili was stood down the next year from Samoa's High Performance Unit over further off field issues, having fronted court over a domestic violence complaint and a separate instance of assault with a dangerous weapon.

== See also ==
- List of Samoa national rugby union players
