= Will Edwards (rugby union) =

English rugby union player (born 1995)

- Born: William George Edwards; 17 November 1995 (age 30) Royal Tunbridge Wells, Kent, England
- Height: 5 ft 8 in (1.73 m)
- Weight: 14 st 0 lb (89 kg)
- School: The Skinners' School
- University: Loughborough University

Rugby union career
- Position: Fly-half
Youth career
- -: Tunbridge Wells
Senior career
Years	Team	Apps	(Points)
2020–2024	Harlequins		
National sevens team
Years	Team		Comps
2017-2020	England Rugby		

William George Edwards is an English rugby union and rugby sevens player who has represented Loughborough Students, Saracens, Northampton Saints, Harlequins Rugby Club and England. He made his breakthrough in 2017, when he was called up to the World Series squad for the Vancouver tournament, which England went on to win.

Edwards became a full-time member of the squad following call ups to Singapore, Paris and London Sevens and went on to represent the squad until 2020 when England Rugby made the Sevens programme redundant. Edwards was made captain of the team in the Clermont-Ferrand Men's Seven's Grand Prix 2017 in late June. Will, went on to represent the squad until 2020 when England Rugby made the Sevens Programme redundant in August 2020.

Will, following his redundancy was quick to be snapped up by Premiership club, Harlequins, with whom he signed a short term deal in November 2020.

== Early life ==
Edwards was born on 17 November 1995 in Royal Tunbridge Wells, Kent. He attended St Augustines Catholic Primary School and The Skinners' School and played at a youth level for Tunbridge Wells RFC and later at Sevenoaks RFC, where he was selected to play for Kent Rugby Football Union. He gained a place at the Loughborough University in 2014.

== Career ==
=== Harlequins ===
During the Derby Day loss to London rivals Saracens, Edwards replaced the injured fly-half Tommaso Allan, where he helped set-up a try before converting.

With Marcus Smith away on England Camp, Edwards got the number 10 shirt against London Wasps, where, in the warm up he turned his ankle but continued on to lead Harlequins from the midfield along with stalwart Danny Care to win the game. His impact on the game saw him awarded with his first Gallagher Premiership Man of the Match award.
