= Harry Glover (rugby union) =

England rugby union player

- Born: 31 December 1995 (age 30) London, England
- Height: 1.92 m (6 ft 4 in)
- Weight: 99 kg (218 lb)

Rugby union career
National sevens teams
Years	Team	Comps
2016-2023	England 7s	
2021-Present	Great Britain 7s	
- Correct as of 26 July 2021

Harry Glover (born 31 December 1995) is an English rugby union player. He has represented the England national rugby sevens team and the Great Britain national rugby sevens team and has also played for Stade Français Paris.

== Early and personal life ==
London-born, he was educated at Rokeby School and Harrow School. Glover represented Middlesex from U14 level through to the U18 side. He studied politics and economics at Newcastle University. His brother Will is also a rugby player who has represented England at Sevens rugby. He set up his own business with a friend during the Coronavirus pandemic in 2021, and the subsequent disbandment of the England sevens programme.

== Club career ==
He started playing rugby for Rosslyn Park and spent time in the Wasps RFC academy.

Glover joined US Carcassonne in 2021 to play in the Rugby Pro D2 league in France. In May 2021, he was announced as signing for Stade Français for the 2021-22 season to compete in the Top 14 and stayed for two seasons before switching back to international sevens rugby.

== International career ==
He for England in the HSBC World Rugby Sevens Series, and finished as runner-up on four separate occasions. He was selected for the 2018 Rugby World Cup Sevens in San Francisco, where England reached the final but were defeated by New Zealand. He was a member of the England sevens squad that won a bronze medal at the 2018 Commonwealth Games on the Gold Coast, Queensland.

He was named in the Great Britain rugby sevens team to compete at the delayed 2020 Olympic Games, held in Tokyo, Japan, in 2021. He was named in the England sevens squad to compete in rugby sevens at the 2022 Commonwealth Games in Birmingham.

He played for GB Sevens in the SVNS series after the formation of the GB programme to run from 2023 onwards, replacing the separate England, Wales, and Scotland programmes. In May 2025, he was in the Dream Team of the Year for the 2024-25 SVNS.
