= Joe Ravouvou =

- Full name: Joseva Ravouvou
- Born: 21 April 1991 (age 35) Fiji
- Height: 190 cm (6 ft 3 in)
- Weight: 105 kg (231 lb; 16 st 7 lb)
- School: Lelean Memorial School

Rugby union career
- Position: Wing
- Current team: Aviron Bayonnais
Senior career
Years	Team	Apps	(Points)
2016–2018	Auckland	10	(20)
2019–2020	Bay of Plenty	9	(40)
2020-	Aviron Bayonnais	38	(62)
- Correct as of 10 June 2022
National sevens team
Years	Team		Comps
2017–	New Zealand		20
- Correct as of 1 June 2019

Joseva Ravouvou (born 21 March 1991) is a Fijian-born rugby player who plays for the New Zealand national rugby sevens team. Ravouvou joined the New Zealand sevens team in 2016 and made his debut at the 2017 Hong Kong Sevens. Ravouvou scored two tries in a 38–14 win over Argentina in the 2017 South Africa Sevens final, and was named Man of the Match. Joe Ravouvou sign with Aviron Bayonnais rugby for 2 years.
