= Ben Cambriani =

Welsh rugby union player

- Full name: Ben Cambriani
- Born: 24 December 1999 (age 26) Swansea, Wales
- Height: 183 cm (6 ft 0 in)
- Weight: 92 kg (203 lb)
- School: Bishopston Comprehensive School
- University: n/a

Rugby union career
- Position: Wing
Senior career
Years	Team	Apps	(Points)
2018–2021	Ospreys	0	(0)
2021–2023	Ampthill	27	(105)
2023–2024	Zebre Parma	4	(5)
- Correct as of 10 May 2023
National sevens team
Years	Team		Comps
2018–2021	Wales 7s		8
- Correct as of 30 Apr 23

Ben Cambriani (born 24 December 1999) is a Welsh rugby union player.

Cambriani signed for Zebre Parma in May 2023 ahead of the 2023–24 United Rugby Championship. He made his debut in Round 1 of the 2023–24 season against the Ulster. He played with Zebre until December 2024.

Cambriani has represented the Wales Sevens team at 8 events.

Cambriani is eligible to play with Italy according to new eligibility rules.
