= Charlton Kerr =

English rugby union player (born 1997)

- Born: 6 October 1997 (age 29) Milton Keynes, England
- Height: 1.90 m (6 ft 3 in)
- Weight: 100 kg (15 st 10 lb; 220 lb)
- School: Stowe School

Rugby union career
- Position(s): Full back, Wing
Youth career
- Northampton Saints
- Wasps
Senior career
Years	Team	Apps	(Points)
2020-2021	London Irish		
2021-2022	RC Toulon		
2021-2022	Union Cognac-Saint-Jean		
National sevens teams
Years	Team		Comps
2016–	England 7s		
2024-	Great Britain 7s		

Charlton Kerr (born 6 October 1997) is an English rugby union player. He has played rugby sevens for England and Great Britain.

== Early life ==
Born in Milton Keynes, he started playing rugby at Towcestrians RFC in Northamptonshire when he was aged four years-old. He attended Stowe School.

== Club career ==
He was in the academies at Wasps RFC and Northampton Saints prior to joining London Irish in 2020. He joined Union Cognac-Saint-Jean in 2021 having played for RC Toulon in the La Rochelle Super Sevens.

In July 2026, he was one of the first players announced for the Ultimate Sevens Championship, prior to the inaugural competition launch later that year.

== International career ==
Kerr made his England national rugby sevens team debut in 2016 at the Las Vegas Sevens. He was awarded a full-time contract ahead of the 2017–18 season. He was selected to represent England at the 2022 Commonwealth Games and the 2022 Rugby World Cup Sevens. He scored 27 tries in his first 90 appearances for England.

He played for Great Britain national rugby sevens team in 2024 at the tried to qualify for the 2024 Paris Olympics, his efforts including a first-half hat-trick in the 29–5 win over Uganda in the repechage tournament in Monaco. He played for Great Britain in the 2024–25 SVNS series. He was named captain of the British rugby sevens team for the 2025-26 SVNS.
