= Mike Ellery =

English rugby union player

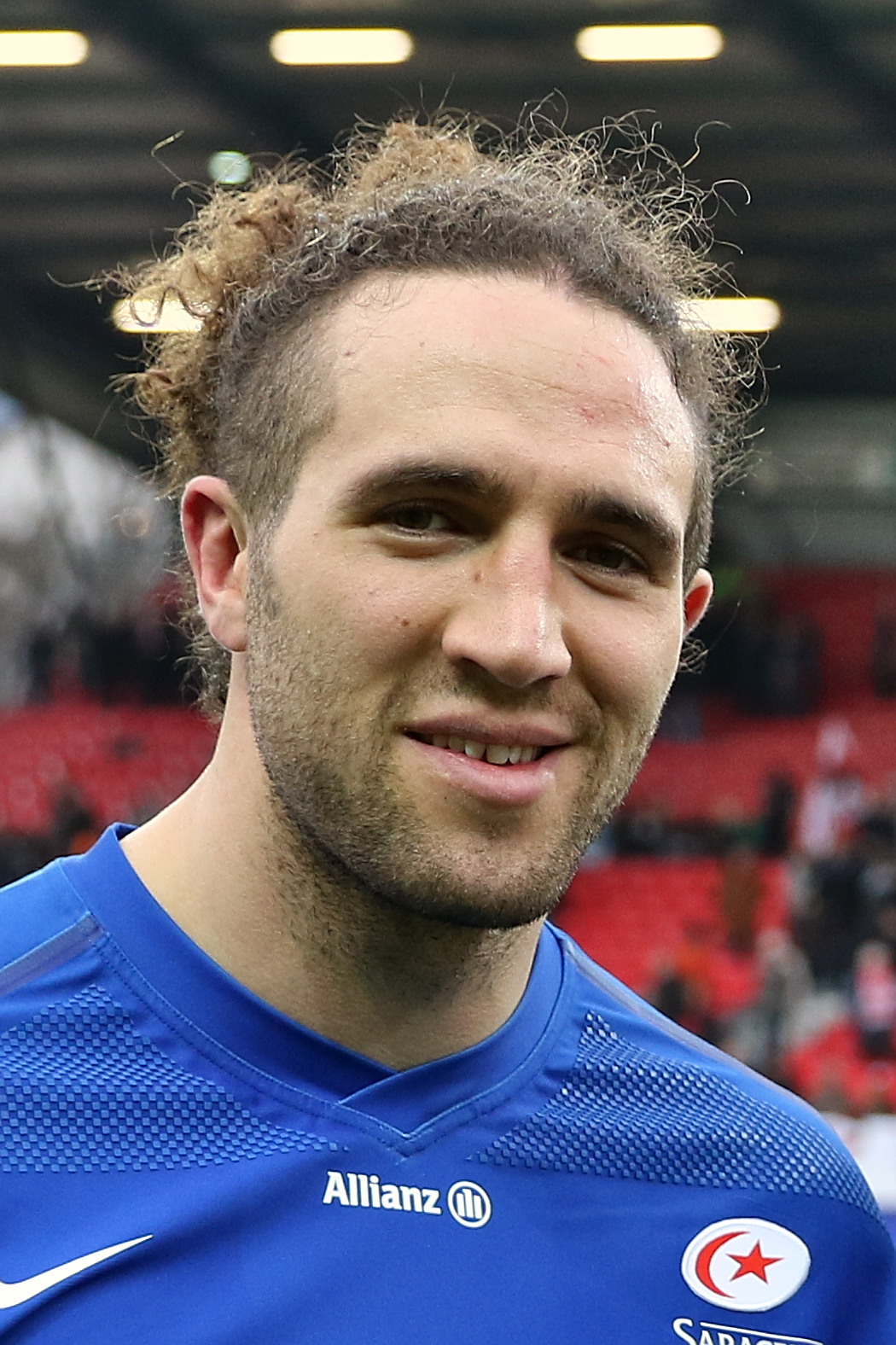
- Born: Mike Ellery; 8 September 1989 (age 37) Penrith, England
- Height: 1.93 m (6 ft 4 in)
- Weight: 102 kg (225 lb; 16 st 1 lb)

Rugby union career
- Position: Wing
Amateur team(s)
Years	Team	Apps	(Points)
2006	Penrith		
2007	Darlington Mowden Park		
2008	Westoe RFC		
2009	Newcastle Academy		
Senior career
Years	Team	Apps	(Points)
2010–2012	Moseley	39	(45)
2014-	Saracens	52	(75)
2014	→ Bedford Blues	1	(0)
- Correct as of 8 February 2015
National sevens team
Years	Team		Comps
2012–2020	England 7s		30

Mike Ellery (born 8 September 1989 in Penrith, England) is an English professional rugby union player. He plays at wing for Saracens. He also plays for the England national rugby sevens team.
