= Marcus Tupuola =

American rugby union player

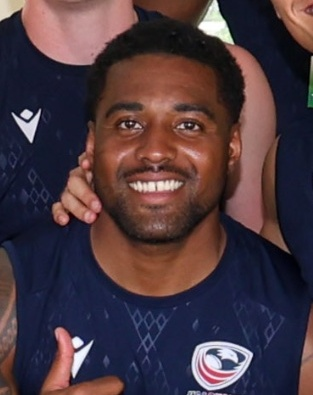
- Born: October 5, 1995 (age 31) Carson, California, U.S.
- Height: 5 ft 7 in (1.7 m)
- Weight: 198 lb (90 kg)
- School: Notre Dame College

Rugby union career
- Position: Wing
Senior career
Years	Team	Apps	(Points)
2019–2022	San Diego Legion	5	(0)
- Correct as of December 1, 2023
National sevens team
Years	Team		Comps
2019–	United States		26
- Correct as of December 1, 2023
Medal record
Men's rugby sevens
Representing United States
Pan American Games
Bronze medal – third place	2019 Lima	Team competition

Marcus Tupuola (born October 5, 1995) is an American professional rugby union player who plays as a back for the United States national sevens team.

== International career ==
Tupuola grew up in Carson, California, where he attended Carson High School. He attended university at Notre Dame College. He played for Major League Rugby side San Diego Legion in the 2019 Major League Rugby season.

Tupuola also represents the United States national rugby sevens team where he plays fly-half. He debuted for the US Sevens team in 2019. He represented the U.S. in Rugby sevens at the 2019 Pan American Games.

He competed for the United States at the 2024 Summer Olympics in Paris.
