= Siosifa Lisala =

Tongan rugby union player (born1994)

- Born: 2 February 1994 (age 32) Tonga
- Height: 189 cm (6 ft 2 in)
- Weight: 91 kg (201 lb; 14 st 5 lb)

Rugby union career
- Position(s): Wing, Centre, Flanker
Senior career
Years	Team	Apps	(Points)
2018–2021	Toyota Industries Shuttles	20	(100)
2021-2022	NTT DoCoMo Red Hurricanes Osaka	6	(0)
2022-2026	Urayasu D-Rocks	21	(25)
- Correct as of 22 February 2021
Super Rugby
Years	Team	Apps	(Points)
2020	Waratahs	1	(0)
- Correct as of 22 February 2021
International career
Years	Team	Apps	(Points)
2012	Tonga U20	3	(0)
- Correct as of 22 February 2021
National sevens team
Years	Team		Comps
2016–2019	Japan Sevens		10

Siosifa Lisala (born 2 February 1994 in Tonga) is a Tongan-born Japanese rugby union player for the NSW Waratahs in Super Rugby. His playing position is wing. He has signed to the Waratahs squad for the 2020 season.
