= Franco Sábato =

Argentine rugby sevens player

- Born: January 13, 1990 (age 36) Buenos Aires, Argentina
- Height: 1.86 m (6 ft 1 in)
- Weight: 88 kg (194 lb; 13 st 12 lb)

Rugby union career
- Position: Wing
National sevens team
Years	Team	Comps
- Argentina
Medal record
Men's rugby sevens
Representing Argentina
Pan American Games
Gold medal – first place	2019 Lima	Team competition

Franco Sábato (born January 13, 1990) is an Argentine rugby sevens player. He competed at the 2016 Summer Olympics for Argentina 7s.
