= 2019 USA Sevens =

Rugby Sevens tournament hosted in the USA

- Sevens World Series XX
- Host nation: United States
- Date: 1–3 March 2019

Cup
- Champion: United States
- Runner-up: Samoa
- Third: New Zealand

Tournament details
- Matches played: 45
- Tries scored: 262 (average 5.82 per match)
- Most points: Nathan Hirayama (53)
- Most tries: Carlin Isles (8)

The 2019 USA Sevens (also sometimes referred to as the 2019 Las Vegas Sevens) is the sixteenth edition of the USA Sevens tournament, and the sixth tournament of the 2018–19 World Rugby Sevens Series. The tournament was played March 1–3, 2019 at Sam Boyd Stadium in Las Vegas, Nevada.

In January 2019, it was reported that the 2019 USA Sevens would be the last in Las Vegas, with the event moving to an unknown city starting from 2020. Possible options are San Diego, which had been home to the USA Sevens before it moved to Las Vegas; San Francisco, which hosted the 2018 Rugby World Cup Sevens; and Miami in Florida. Among the reported reasons included the uncertain status of Sam Boyd Stadium with the upcoming stadium not due to be ready until summer 2020, poor living environment at the team hotels (the stadium is far distant from the main tourist area of the Las Vegas Strip), and safety concerns due to an unusually narrow pitch with team benches very close to the touchlines (Sam Boyd Stadium is built for American football, a sport with a playing field about 20 metres narrower than a standard rugby pitch). The stadium's normal pitch is artificial turf, which raised even more safety concerns in the early years of the event's run in Las Vegas, but temporary grass pitches were used in the 2017, 2018 and 2019 events.

== Format ==
The teams are drawn into four pools of four teams each. Each team plays every other team in their pool once. The top two teams from each pool advance to the Cup bracket where teams compete for the Gold, Silver, and Bronze Medals. The bottom two teams from each group go to the Challenge Trophy bracket.

== Teams ==
Fifteen core teams played in the tournament along with one invitational team, the winner of the 2019 Sudamérica Rugby Sevens, Chile:

- Argentina
- Australia
- Canada
- Chile
- England
- Fiji
- France
- Japan
- Kenya
- New Zealand
- Samoa
- Scotland
- South Africa
- Spain
- United States
- Wales

== Pool stage ==
All times in Pacific Standard Time (UTC−08:00). The pools were scheduled as follows:

=== Pool A ===
Team	Pld	W	D	L	PF	PA	PD	Pts
New Zealand	3	3	0	0	85	26	+59	9
Samoa	3	2	0	1	52	73	−21	7
Spain	3	0	1	2	40	57	−17	4
Canada	3	0	1	2	50	71	−21	4

1 March 2019
15:44

Spain	12–12	Canada
Try: Alonso 1'm Fontes 10'c Con: Hernández (1/2) 11'		Try: Braid 4'm Cejvanovic 14'c Con: Hirayama (1/2) 14'

Sam Boyd Stadium, Las Vegas
Referee: Jordan Way (Australia)

1 March 2019
16:06

New Zealand	33–0	Samoa
Try: Ware (2) 3', 4'; Molia (2) 6'c, 11'c Baker 7'm Con: Koroi (3/4) 3', 4', 7'; Rokolisoa (1/1) 11'

Sam Boyd Stadium, Las Vegas
Referee: Craig Evans (Wales)

1 March 2019
18:45

Spain	21–26	Samoa
Try: Sainz-Trapaga 3'c Alonso 8'c Mateu 13'c Con: Hernández (1/1) 3', 9', 14'		Try: Solia 3'c Afamasaga 4'c Alofipo 10'c Samuelu 12'm Con: Mealoi (3/3) 4', 5', 10'; Alofipo (0/1)

Sam Boyd Stadium, Las Vegas
Referee: Damián Schneider (Argentina)

1 March 2019
19:07

New Zealand	33–19	Canada
Try: Rokolisoa 0'; Ravouvou 6'c Mikkelson (2) 7'c, 10'm Nareki 9'c Con: Rokolisoa (4/4) 1', 6', 8', 9'; Koroi (0/1)		Try: McCloskey 3'm Fuailefau 7'c Jones 14'c Con: Hirayama (2/3) 7', 14'

Sam Boyd Stadium, Las Vegas
Referee: Sam Grove-White (Scotland)

2 March 2019
12:14

Canada	19–26	Samoa
Try: McCloskey 5'; Hirayama (2) 8'c, 11'm Con: Hirayama (2/3) 6', 8'		Try: Alofipo (2) 0'm, 3'c Vaili 7'c Motuga 12'c Con: Mealoi (2/3) 4', 7'; Paulo (1/1)13'

Sam Boyd Stadium, Las Vegas
Referee: Jérémy Rozier (France)

2 March 2019
12:36

New Zealand	19–7	Spain
Try: Ravouvou 0'c Koroi 4'c Dickson 11'm Con: Koroi (2/2) 1', 5'; Baker (0/1)		Try: Mateu 10'c Con: Mateu (1/1) 10'

Sam Boyd Stadium, Las Vegas
Referee: Damián Schneider (Argentina)

=== Pool B ===
Team	Pld	W	D	L	PF	PA	PD	Pts
United States	3	2	0	1	69	46	+23	7
Argentina	3	2	0	1	62	63	−1	7
France	3	1	0	2	56	43	+13	5
Kenya	3	1	0	2	41	76	−35	5

1 March 2019
16:28

France	15–17	Argentina
Try: Laugel 10'm Barraque 12'm Mignot 14'm Con: Barraque (0/3)		Try: Mare 1'm Etchart 6'c Con: Mare (1/2) 6'; Bazan Velez (0/1)

Sam Boyd Stadium, Las Vegas
Referee: Paulo Duarte (Portugal)

1 March 2019
16:50

United States	26–10	Kenya
Try: Isles (2) 2'm, 5'c Tomasin 8'c Hughes 11'c Con: Hughes (3/4) 5', 9', 11'		Try: Ojee 6'm Onyala 13'm Con: Taabu (0/2)

Sam Boyd Stadium, Las Vegas
Referee: Damián Schneider (Argentina)

1 March 2019
19:29

France	31–7	Kenya
Try: Riva 4'm Barraque 6'c Parez 8'c Laugel 12'c O'Connor 13'm Con: Barraque (3/5) 7', 9', 12'		Try: Onyala 10'c Con: Taabu (1/1) 11'

Sam Boyd Stadium, Las Vegas
Referee: Francisco González (Uruguay)

1 March 2019
19:51

United States	24–26	Argentina
Try: Isles (2) 0'm, 11'; Iosefo 3'c Tomasin 7'c Con: Hughes (2/4) 4', 7'		Try: Bazan Velez 5'c Barbier 8'm Luna 10'c Gonzalez 14'; Con: Bazan Velez (1/1) 6'; Mare (2/3) 11', 14'

Sam Boyd Stadium, Las Vegas
Referee: Richard Kelly (New Zealand)

2 March 2019
12:58

Argentina	19–24	Kenya
Try: Mare 2'm Provenzano 3'c Ulloa 9'c Con: Mare (1/2) 4'; Ulloa (1/1) 10'		Try: Kuto (2) 5'm, 10'; Ojee 7'c Taabu 8'c Con: Taabu (2/4) 7', 8'

Sam Boyd Stadium, Las Vegas
Referee: Sam Grove-White (Scotland)

2 March 2019
13:20

United States	19–10	France
Try: Pinkelman 4'm Iosefo (2) 7'c, 7'; Con: Hughes (2/3) 7', 8'		Try: Deghmache 10'm Mazzoleni 12'm Con: Barraque (0/2)

Sam Boyd Stadium, Las Vegas
Referee: Craig Evans (Wales)

=== Pool C ===
Team	Pld	W	D	L	PF	PA	PD	Pts
South Africa	3	2	1	0	60	17	+43	8
England	3	2	0	1	65	41	+24	7
Japan	3	1	0	2	31	64	−33	5
Chile	3	0	1	2	12	46	−34	4

1 March 2019
17:12

South Africa	26–0	Japan
Try: Du Preez 6'c Visser 7'm Davids 11'c Ndlhlovu 14'c Con: Du Preez (1/2) 6'; Davids (2/2) 11', 14'

Sam Boyd Stadium, Las Vegas
Referee: Francisco González (Uruguay)

1 March 2019
17:34

England	22–0	Chile
Try: Burgess (2) 0'm, 6'm Olowofela 2'c Edwards 13'm Con: Bibby (1/3) 3'; Edwards (0/1)

Sam Boyd Stadium, Las Vegas
Referee: Jérémy Rozier (France)

1 March 2019
20:13

South Africa	5–5	Chile
Try: Du Preez 3'm Con: Du Preez (0/1)		Try: De Vidts 10'm Con: Fernández (0/1)

Sam Boyd Stadium, Las Vegas
Referee: Paulo Duarte (Portugal)

1 March 2019
20:35

England	31–12	Japan
Try: Norton (3) 4'c, 7'm, 8'c Muir 5'm de Carpentier 10'c Con: Edwards (2/4) 5', 8'; Mitchell (1/1) 11'		Try: Lisala 1'm Ozawa 13'c Con: Nakazawa (1/1) 13'; Goya (0/1)

Sam Boyd Stadium, Las Vegas
Referee: Jordan Way (Australia)

2 March 2019
13:48

Japan	19–7	Chile
Try: Ozawa 2'm Koyama 7'c Ishida 13'c Con: Nakazawa (1/1) 8'; Fujita (1/1) 13'; Hayashi (0/1)		Try: Verschae 5'c Con: Fernández (1/1) 6'

Sam Boyd Stadium, Las Vegas
Referee: Francisco González (Uruguay)

2 March 2019
14:10

England	12–29	South Africa
Try: Bowen 5'm Kerr 12'c Con: Edwards (1/2) 13'		Try: Snyman 1'm Soyizwapi 7'm Geduld 8'c Pretorius 10'; Davids 14'c Con: Du Preez (1/3) 9'; Davids (1/2) 14'

Sam Boyd Stadium, Las Vegas
Referee: Richard Kelly (New Zealand)

=== Pool D ===
Team	Pld	W	D	L	PF	PA	PD	Pts
Australia	3	3	0	0	76	27	+49	9
Fiji	3	2	0	1	84	52	+32	7
Scotland	3	1	0	2	43	74	−31	5
Wales	3	0	0	3	28	78	−50	3

1 March 2019
15:00

Australia	26–0	Wales
Try: Holland 1'c Quinn 6'; Hutchison 8'c Porch 10'c Con: Porch (3/3) 1', 8', 10'

Sam Boyd Stadium, Las Vegas
Referee: Sam Grove-White (Scotland)

1 March 2019
15:22

Fiji	36–12	Scotland
Try: Nacuqu (2) 1'm, 7'c Botitu (2) 3'm, 12'm Veilawa (2) 7'c, 14'c Con: Nacuqu (1/3) 7'; Veilawa (2/3) 8', 14'		Try: McFarland 6'c Fergusson 10'm Con: Lowe (1/2) 6'

Sam Boyd Stadium, Las Vegas
Referee: Richard Kelly (New Zealand)

1 March 2019
18:01

Australia	24–12	Scotland
Try: Hutchison 1'm Skelton 6'c Porch (2) 7'c, 12'm Con: Holland (1/1) 6'; Porch (1/3) 7'		Try: McFarland 2'c Lowe 4'm Con: Lowe (1/2) 2'

Sam Boyd Stadium, Las Vegas
Referee: Craig Evans (Wales)

1 March 2019
18:23

Fiji	33–14	Wales
Try: Kunavula 1'm Tuwai 4'c Nacuqu 6'c Naduva 7'c Dranisinukula 9'c Con: Botitu (1/1) 5'; Nacuqu (2/3) 6', 7'; Veilawa (1/1) 10'		Try: Devine (2) 3'c, 12'c Con: Treharne (1/1) 3'; Davies (1/1) 12'

Sam Boyd Stadium, Las Vegas
Referee: Jérémy Rozier (France)

2 March 2019
11:30

Wales	14–19	Scotland
Try: Roach 2'c Devine 9'c Con: Davies (2/2) 2', 10'		Try: Farndale (2) 4'm, 12'c Lowe 6'c Con: Lowe (1/2) 7'; Fergusson (1/1) 13'

Sam Boyd Stadium, Las Vegas
Referee: Jordan Way (Australia)

2 March 2019
11:52

Fiji	15–26	Australia
Try: Tuwai 2'm Dranisinukula 10'm Veilawa 11'm Con: Veilawa (0/2); Botitu (0/1)		Try: Skelton 1'c O'Donnell 5'm Kennewell 7'; Holland 13'; Con: Porch (2/3) 2', 14'; Holland (1/1) 8'

Sam Boyd Stadium, Las Vegas
Referee: Paulo Duarte (Portugal)

== Knockout stage ==
=== Thirteenth place ===
Semi-finals
3 March 2019 – 11:00 – Sam Boyd Stadium, Las Vegas
Wales	31
Japan	14
3 March 2019 – 11:22 – Sam Boyd Stadium, Las Vegas
Canada	28
France	12

Final
3 March 2019 – 13:56 – Sam Boyd Stadium, Las Vegas
Wales	12
Canada	21

Matches

Semifinals

3 March 2019
11:00

Wales	31–14	Japan
Try: Davies 4'c Goodchild 5'c Roach 8'm Rogers 10'm Lewis 13'c Con: Davies (3/5) 4', 6', 14'		Try: Motomura 7'c Ishida 12'c Con: Hayashi (1/1) 7'; Fujita (1/1) 12'

Sam Boyd Stadium, Las Vegas
Referee: Francisco González (Uruguay)

3 March 2019
11:22

Canada	28–12	France
Try: McCloskey 3'c Mullins 7'c Hirayama 13'c Jones 14'c Con: Hirayama (2/2) 3', 7', 13', 14'		Try: Lakafia 8'c Barraque 11'm Con: Barraque (1/1) 8'; Parez (0/1)

Sam Boyd Stadium, Las Vegas
Referee: Paulo Duarte (Portugal)

Final

3 March 2019
13:56

Wales	12–21	Canada
Try: Gasson 11'c Rogers 14'; Con: Treharne (1/1) 11'		Try: Hirayama (2) 0'c, 12'c Fuailefau 7'c Con: Hirayama (3/3) 1', 7', 13'

Sam Boyd Stadium, Las Vegas
Referee: Paulo Duarte (Portugal)

=== Challenge Trophy ===
Quarter-finals
2 March 2019 – 16:08 – Sam Boyd Stadium, Las Vegas
Spain	19
Wales	7
2 March 2019 – 16:30 – Sam Boyd Stadium, Las Vegas
Japan	15
Kenya	28
2 March 2019 – 16:52 – Sam Boyd Stadium, Las Vegas
Scotland	21
Canada	19
2 March 2019 – 17:14 – Sam Boyd Stadium, Las Vegas
France	12
Chile	17

Semi-finals
3 March 2019 – 11:44 – Sam Boyd Stadium, Las Vegas
Spain	24
Kenya	7
3 March 2019 – 12:06 – Sam Boyd Stadium, Las Vegas
Scotland	17
Chile	5

Final
3 March 2019 – 15:10 – Sam Boyd Stadium, Las Vegas
Spain	14
Scotland	15

Matches

Quarterfinals

2 March 2019
16:08

Spain	19–7	Wales
Try: Alonso 3'm Fontes 7'c Mateu 11'c Con: Hernández (2/3) 7', 11'		Try: Roach 8'c Con: Treharne (1/1) 9'

Sam Boyd Stadium, Las Vegas
Referee: Francisco González (Uruguay)

2 March 2019
16:30

Japan	15–28	Kenya
Try: Lisala 0'm Motomura 3'm Soejima 5'; Con: Hayashi (0/2)		Try: Kuto 2'c Onyala (2) 8'c, 12'c Mwale 11'c Con: Taabu (3/3) 2', 8', 11', 13'

Sam Boyd Stadium, Las Vegas
Referee: Paulo Duarte (Portugal)

2 March 2019
16:52

Scotland	21–19	Canada
Try: Fergusson 1'c McFarland (2) 7'c, 11'c Con: Lowe (2/2) 1', 7'; Fergusson (1/1) 12'		Try: Thiel 6'm Braid 8'c Jones 13'c Con: Hirayama (2/3) 8', 14'

Sam Boyd Stadium, Las Vegas
Referee: Damián Schneider (Argentina)

2 March 2019
17:14

France	12–17	Chile
Try: Bonnefond 7'm Barraque 12'c Con: Barraque (1/2) 12'		Try: Brangier 1'm Verschae 10'c Metuaze 11'm Con: Fernández (1/2) Neira (0/1)

Sam Boyd Stadium, Las Vegas
Referee: Sam Grove-White (Scotland)

Semifinals

3 March 2019
11:44

Spain	24–7	Kenya
Try: Rodriguez-Guerra 1'c Carrión (2) 4'm, 8'c Fontes 11'm Con: Hernández (2/4) 1', 9'		Try: Mwale 5'c Con: Taabu (1/1) 6'

Sam Boyd Stadium, Las Vegas
Referee: Sam Grove-White (Scotland)

3 March 2019
12:06

Scotland	17–5	Chile
Try: Fergusson 6'c McFarland 7'm Elms 13'; Con: Fergusson (1/2) 6'; Elms (0/1)		Try: De Vidts 3'

Sam Boyd Stadium, Las Vegas
Referee: Jordan Way (Australia)

Final

3 March 2019
15:10

Spain	14–15	Scotland
Try: Mateu 2'c Losada 12'c Con: Mateu (2/2) 2', 13'		Try: Coombes 7'm Pecqueur 9'm Farndale 14'm Con: Fergusson (0/2); Lowe (0/1)

Sam Boyd Stadium, Las Vegas
Referee: Jérémy Rozier (France)

=== 5th place ===
Semi-finals
3 March 2019 – 12:28 – Sam Boyd Stadium, Las Vegas
Fiji	14
South Africa	12
3 March 2019 – 12:50 – Sam Boyd Stadium, Las Vegas
Australia	14
England	33

Final
3 March 2019 – 15:35 – Sam Boyd Stadium, Las Vegas
Fiji	14
England	19

Matches

Semifinals

3 March 2019
12:28

Fiji	14–12	South Africa
Try: Vakurunabili 0'c Nasoko 6'c Con: Botitu (2/2) 1', 7'		Try: Oosthuizen 3'm Pretorius 10'c Con: Davids (1/1) 10'; Du Preez (0/1)

Sam Boyd Stadium, Las Vegas
Referee: Jérémy Rozier (France)

3 March 2019
12:50

Australia	14–33	England
Try: McNamara 1'c Hutchison 4'c Con: Porch (2/2) 2', 5'		Try: Norton 3'c Edwards 6'c Muir (2) 7'c, 9'c Olowofela 12'; Con: Edwards (4/5) 3', 6', 8', 10'

Sam Boyd Stadium, Las Vegas
Referee: Damián Schneider (Argentina)

Final

3 March 2019
15:35

Fiji	15–19	England
Try: Tuwai 3'm Naduva 5'm Veilawa 11'; Con: Botitu (0/3)		Try: Muir 1'c Olowofela 12'c Kerr 14'; Con: Mitchell (1/1) 1', 13'

Sam Boyd Stadium, Las Vegas
Referee: Damián Schneider (Argentina)

=== Cup ===
Quarter-finals
2 March 2019 – 17:46 – Sam Boyd Stadium, Las Vegas
New Zealand	19
Fiji	14
2 March 2019 – 18:08 – Sam Boyd Stadium, Las Vegas
South Africa	10
United States	29
2 March 2019 – 18:30 – Sam Boyd Stadium, Las Vegas
Australia	20
Samoa	21
2 March 2019 – 18:52 – Sam Boyd Stadium, Las Vegas
Argentina	26 (a.e.t.)
England	21

Semi-finals
3 March 2019 – 13:12 – Sam Boyd Stadium, Las Vegas
New Zealand	19
United States	24
3 March 2019 – 13:34 – Sam Boyd Stadium, Las Vegas
Samoa	33
Argentina	19

Final
3 March 2019 – 16:30 – Sam Boyd Stadium, Las Vegas
United States	27
Samoa	0
Third place
3 March 2019 – 16:00 – Sam Boyd Stadium, Las Vegas
New Zealand	26
Argentina	19

Matches

Quarterfinals

2 March 2019
17:46

New Zealand	19–14	Fiji
Try: Molia (2) 2'm, 9'c Baker 11'c Con: Baker (2/2) 10', 12'; Koroi (0/1)		Try: Tuwai (2) 4'c, 8'c Con: Botitu (2/2) 5', 8'

Sam Boyd Stadium, Las Vegas
Referee: Jordan Way (Australia)

2 March 2019
18:08

South Africa	10–29	United States
Try: Pretorius 12'm Gans 13'm Con: Davids (0/2)		Try: Barrett 1'm Tomasin 3'c Iosefo 5'c Isles 8'm Leuta 9'm Con: Hughes (2/5) 4', 6'

Sam Boyd Stadium, Las Vegas
Referee: Richard Kelly (New Zealand)

2 March 2019
18:30

Australia	20–21	Samoa
Try: Porch 1'm McNamara 7'm Ben O'Donnell 9'm Kennewell 13'm Con: Porch (0/4)		Try: Vaili 3'c Perez 5'c Asofolau 11'c Con: Mealoi (2/2) 3', 6'; Paulo (1/1) 11'

Sam Boyd Stadium, Las Vegas
Referee: Jérémy Rozier (France)

2 March 2019
18:52

Argentina	26–21 (a.e.t.)	England
Try: Mare 0'c Penalty Try 7'; Luna 10'c Con: Mare (2/2) 1', 10'		Try: Burgess 4'c Olowofela 11'c Bowen 14'c Con: Mitchell (3/3) 4', 12', 14'

Sam Boyd Stadium, Las Vegas
Referee: Craig Evans (Wales)

Semifinals

3 March 2019
13:12

New Zealand	19–24	United States
Try: Molia 0'c Baker 4'm Mikkelson 9'c Con: Baker (1/2) 0', 9'		Try: Niua 5'c Isles (3) 7'c, 7'm, 14'; Con: Hughes (2/3) 6', 7'

Sam Boyd Stadium, Las Vegas
Referee: Craig Evans (Wales)

3 March 2019
13:34

Samoa	33–19	Argentina
Try: Afamasaga 0'c Vaili 2'; Solia 3'; Asofolau 7'c Motuga 11'c Con: Mealoi (4/5) 0', 2', 8', 11'		Try: Ulloa (2) 5'm, 12'; Florio 14'c Con: Ulloa (2/2) 13', 14'; Mare (0/1)

Sam Boyd Stadium, Las Vegas
Referee: Richard Kelly (New Zealand)

Third Place

3 March 2019
16:00

New Zealand	26–19	Argentina
Try: Ravouvou 0'c Ng Shiu 11'm Molia 12'c, 13'c Con: Baker (1/1) 0'; Koroi (2/3) 12', 13'		Try: Etchart 1'c Schulz (2) 7'c, 9'm Con: Mare (1/2) 2'; Ulloa (1/1) 7'

Sam Boyd Stadium, Las Vegas
Referee: Jordan Way (Australia)

Final

3 March 2019
16:30

United States	27–0	Samoa
Try: Pinkelman (2) 1'm, 12'; Leuta 3'm Hughes 7'c Brown 14'; Con: Hughes (1/4) 8'

Sam Boyd Stadium, Las Vegas
Referee: Richard Kelly (New Zealand)

== Tournament placings ==
Place	Team	Points
1st place, gold medalist(s)	United States	22
2nd place, silver medalist(s)	Samoa	19
3rd place, bronze medalist(s)	New Zealand	17
4	Argentina	15
5	England	13
6	Fiji	12
7	Australia	10
7	South Africa	10
9	Scotland	8
10	Spain	7
11	Chile	5
11	Kenya	5
13	Canada	3
14	Wales	2
15	France	1
15	Japan	1

Source: World Rugby

== Players ==
=== Scoring leaders ===
Tries scored
Rank	Player	Tries
1	Carlin Isles	8
2	Sione Molia	7
3	Jerry Tuwai	5
3	Max McFarland	5
3	Nathan Hirayama	5

Points scored
Rank	Player	Points
1	Nathan Hirayama	53
2	Carlin Isles	40
3	John Porch	36
4	Sione Molia	35
5	Madison Hughes	34

Source: World Rugby

=== Dream Team ===
The following seven players were selected to the tournament Dream Team at the conclusion of the tournament:

Forwards	Backs
(Samoa) David Afamasaga (United States) Stephen Tomasin (United States) Ben Pinkelman	(New Zealand) Sione Molia (United States) Martin Iosefo (Fiji) Jerry Tuwai (United States) Carlin Isles

World Sevens Series XX
Preceded by 2019 Sydney Sevens	2019 USA Sevens	Succeeded by 2019 Canada Sevens
USA Sevens
Preceded by 2018 USA Sevens	2019 USA Sevens	Succeeded by 2020 USA Sevens
