= 2018–19 South Africa national rugby sevens team season =

South Africa national rugby sevens team
- 2018–19 season
- Head coach: Neil Powell
- Captain: Philip Snyman
- Overall rank: 4th
- Tournaments: Dubai — 6th; Cape Town — 3rd; Hamilton — 4th; Sydney — 5th; Las Vegas — 7th / 8th; Vancouver — 1st; Hong Kong — 7th / 8th; Singapore — 1st; London — 7th / 8th; Paris — 3rd
- Record: Won 40, Drew 1, Lost 16 (Overall)
- Top try scorer: All: Siviwe Soyizwapi (33)
- Top points scorer: All: Selvyn Davids (203)

In 2018–19, the South Africa national rugby sevens team participated in the 2018–19 World Rugby Sevens Series, the 20th edition of the competition since its inception in 1999–2000.

== Squad ==
The following players were named in the South Africa national rugby sevens squad for the 2018–19 World Rugby Sevens Series:

2018–2019 South Africa World Rugby Sevens squad
Player	Position	Date of birth (age)	Debut	Tournaments	Matches	Points	Ref
Cecil Afrika	Back	3 March 1988 (aged 30)	2009 Dubai Sevens	61	318	1,430	
Kurt-Lee Arendse	Back	17 June 1996 (aged 22)	—	0	0	0	
Kyle Brown	Forward	6 February 1987 (aged 31)	2008 Dubai Sevens	65	327	420	
Angelo Davids	Back	1 June 1999 (aged 19)	—	0	0	0	
Selvyn Davids	Back	26 March 1994 (aged 24)	2017 Hong Kong Sevens	5	25	97	
Zain Davids	Forward	4 May 1997 (aged 21)	2017 Wellington Sevens	13	60	45	
Chris Dry	Forward	13 February 1988 (aged 30)	2010 Adelaide Sevens	64	319	460	
Muller du Plessis	Back	25 June 1999 (aged 19)	2018 USA Sevens	4	20	55	
Branco du Preez	Back	8 May 1990 (aged 28)	2010 Wellington Sevens	61	306	1,162	
Stedman Gans	Back	19 March 1997 (aged 21)	2017 USA Sevens	11	46	60	
Justin Geduld	Back	1 October 1993 (aged 25)	2013 Wellington Sevens	36	186	833	
Dewald Human	Back	19 May 1995 (aged 23)	2017 Paris Sevens	4	18	66	
Werner Kok	Forward / Back	17 January 1993 (aged 25)	2013 London Sevens	37	184	420	
Sako Makata	Forward	10 September 1998 (aged 20)	—	0	0	0	
James Murphy	Forward	30 November 1995 (aged 23)	2018 Hong Kong Sevens	2	11	0	
Mfundo Ndhlovu	Back	5 April 1997 (aged 21)	2018 Hong Kong Sevens	2	10	10	
Ryan Oosthuizen	Forward	22 May 1995 (aged 23)	2017 Hong Kong Sevens	10	45	55	
JC Pretorius	Forward	29 January 1998 (aged 20)	—	0	0	0	
Philip Snyman (c)	Forward	26 March 1987 (aged 31)	2008 Dubai Sevens	54	248	346	
Siviwe Soyizwapi	Back	7 December 1992 (aged 25)	2016 Hong Kong Sevens	18	89	280	
Rosko Specman	Back	28 April 1989 (aged 29)	2014 Wellington Sevens	26	138	343	
Impi Visser	Forward	30 May 1995 (aged 23)	—	0	0	0	
All information correct as at 30 November 2018, prior to the start of the season.

== Tournaments ==
=== Dubai Sevens ===
The 2018 Dubai Sevens took place from 30 November to 1 December 2018. South Africa were drawn in Pool A of the competition, alongside Argentina, Samoa and Zimbabwe. They beat Zimbabwe and Samoa, and — despite losing their final match to Argentina — finished top of Pool A. They lost to England in their Cup quarter final to drop into the 5th-place play-off. They beat Scotland in the semi-final of that competition, but lost to Fiji in the final to finish sixth in the tournament.

The Pool A log:

Pool A log
Pos	Team	P	W	D	L	PD	Pts
1	South Africa	3	2	0	1	+33	7
2	Argentina	3	2	0	1	+6	7
3	Samoa	3	2	0	1	−3	7
4	Zimbabwe	3	0	0	3	−36	3

The matches played were:

Pool A	30 November 2018	South Africa	31–0	Zimbabwe	Dubai
	10:52	Try: Siviwe Soyizwapi 2'; Branco du Preez 6'; Kyle Brown 8'; Rosko Specman 10', 14+1'; Con: Branco du Preez 2', 7'; Justin Geduld 11'	Scoreboard		Referee: Matt Rodden

Pool A	30 November 2018	South Africa	19–12	Samoa	Dubai
	14:36	Try: Siviwe Soyizwapi 7'; Werner Kok 11'; Muller du Plessis 14'; Con: Branco du Preez 7'; Rosko Specman 11'	Scoreboard	Try: John Vaili 7+1'; Alatasi Tupou 12'; Con: Tila Mealoi 7+1'	Referee: Damian Schneider

Pool A	30 November 2018	South Africa	12–17	Argentina	Dubai
	19:53	Try: Ryan Oosthuizen 3'; Werner Kok 5'; Con: Branco du Preez 3'	Scoreboard	Try: Franco Sábato 1', 14+1'; Marcos Moroni 10'; Con: Gastón Revol 14+2'	Referee: Damon Murphy

Cup QF	1 December 2018	South Africa	5–22	England	Dubai
	11:00	Try: Selvyn Davids 13'	Scoreboard	Try: Tom Mitchell 2', 7'; Tom Bowen 10'; Phil Burgess 11'; Con: Tom Mitchell 7'	Referee: James Doleman

5th SF	1 December 2018	South Africa	29–0	Scotland	Dubai
	15:33	Try: Muller du Plessis 3', 12'; Werner Kok 9'; Zain Davids 11'; Rosko Specman 12'; Con: Dewald Human 10', 11'	Scoreboard		Referee: Jérémy Rozier

5th F	1 December 2018	South Africa	19–24	Fiji	Dubai
	18:40	Try: Muller du Plessis 7', 10', 13'; Con: Dewald Human 8', 13'	Scoreboard	Try: Mesu Kunalolo 6'; Aminiasi Tuimaba 9', 18'; Waisea Nacuqu 14'; Con: Waisea Nacuqu 6'; Vatemo Ravouvou 9'	Referee: Richard Haughton

The player record for the tournament is:

Player record
No	Player	ZIM	SAM	ARG	ENG	SCO	FJI	Apps	Tries	Cons	Points
1	Impi Visser	Yes	Yes	Yes	Yes	Maybe	Maybe	6	0	0	0
2	Philip Snyman	Yes	Yes	Yes	Yes	Yes	Yes	6	0	0	0
3	Ryan Oosthuizen	Yes	Yes	Yes	Yes	Maybe		5	1	0	5
4	Zain Davids	Maybe	Maybe		Maybe	Yes	Yes	5	1	0	5
5	Werner Kok	Yes	Yes	Yes	Yes	Yes	Yes	6	3	0	15
6	Kyle Brown	Maybe	Maybe	Maybe	Maybe	Yes	Yes	6	1	0	5
7	Branco du Preez	Yes	Yes	Yes	Yes		Maybe	5	1	4	13
8	Rosko Specman	Maybe	Maybe	Maybe	Maybe	Yes	Yes	6	3	1	17
9	Justin Geduld	Yes	Yes	Sent to blood bin	Sent to blood bin	Sent to blood bin	Sent to blood bin	2	0	1	2
10	Dewald Human		Maybe	Yes	Yes	Yes	Yes	5	0	4	8
11	Siviwe Soyizwapi	Yes	Yes	Yes	Yes	Maybe	Maybe	6	2	0	10
12	Muller du Plessis	Maybe	Maybe		Maybe	Yes	Yes	5	6	0	30
13	Selvyn Davids (reserve)				Maybe	Maybe	Maybe	3	1	0	5
Total								6	19	10	115
Legend: indicates the player started the match, indicates the player came on as a replacement in the match and indicates a player was ruled out through injury.

=== Cape Town Sevens ===
The 2018 Cape Town Sevens took place from 8 to 9 December 2018. South Africa were drawn in Pool A of the competition, alongside New Zealand, Samoa and Zimbabwe. They beat Zimbabwe and Samoa, and — despite losing their final match to New Zealand — finished top of Pool A. They beat Scotland in the Cup quarter final, before losing to Fiji in the semi-final. They finished in third place after beating New Zealand in the bronze final.

The Pool A log:

Pool A log
Pos	Team	P	W	D	L	PD	Pts
1	South Africa	3	2	0	1	+48	7
2	New Zealand	3	2	0	1	+36	7
3	Samoa	3	2	0	1	+15	7
4	Zimbabwe	3	0	0	3	−99	3

The matches played were:

Pool A	8 December 2018	South Africa	22–12	Samoa	Cape Town
	12:27	Try: Kyle Brown 6'; Philip Snyman 8'; Justin Geduld 9'; Impi Visser 12'; Con: Justin Geduld 13'	Scoreboard	Try: David Afamasaga 2'; John Vaili 15'; Con: Alatasi Tupou 2'	Referee: James Doleman

Pool A	8 December 2018	South Africa	43–0	Zimbabwe	Cape Town
	15:48	Try: Siviwe Soyizwapi 1', 6', 14'; Rosko Specman 5'; Kyle Brown 8'; Justin Geduld 8'; Impi Visser 12'; Con: Justin Geduld 1', 5', 9'; Branco du Preez 8'	Scoreboard		Referee: Jérémy Rozier

Pool A	8 December 2018	New Zealand	26–21	South Africa	Cape Town
	19:56	Try: Andrew Knewstubb 7'; Sione Molia 10', 14'; Vilimoni Koroi 17'; Con: Andrew Knewstubb 7', 15'; Vilimoni Koroi 11'	Scoreboard	Try: Rosko Specman 5'; Werner Kok 10'; Branco du Preez 13'; Con: Justin Geduld 6', 10', 13'	Referee: Damon Murphy

Cup QF	9 December 2018	South Africa	21–12	Scotland	Cape Town
	12:04	Try: Justin Geduld 4'; Rosko Specman 8'; Werner Kok 15'; Con: Justin Geduld 4', 8', 15'	Scoreboard	Try: Sam Pecqueur 7', 11'; Con: Gavin Lowe 8'	Referee: Matt Rodden

Cup SF	9 December 2018	South Africa	12–17	Fiji	Cape Town
	16:34	Try: Siviwe Soyizwapi 2'; Rosko Specman 10'; Con: Justin Geduld 10'	Scoreboard	Try: Vilimoni Botitu 4'; Waisea Nacuqu 6'; Alasio Naduva 14'; Con: Waisea Nacuqu 6'	Referee: James Doleman

Bronze F	9 December 2018	South Africa	10–5	New Zealand	Cape Town
	19:18	Try: Werner Kok 6'; Dewald Human 13'	Scoreboard	Try: Sione Molia 2'	Referee: Matt Rodden

The player record for the tournament is:

Player record
No	Player	SAM	ZIM	NZL	SCO	FJI	NZL	Apps	Tries	Cons	Points
1	Impi Visser	Maybe	Maybe	Maybe	Yes	Yes	Yes	6	2	0	10
2	Philip Snyman	Yes	Yes	Yes	Sent to blood bin	Sent to blood bin	Sent to blood bin	3	1	0	5
3	Ryan Oosthuizen	Maybe	Maybe	Maybe	Maybe	Maybe	Yes	6	0	0	0
4	Zain Davids	Yes	Yes	Yes	Yes	Yes	Sent to blood bin	5	0	0	0
5	Werner Kok	Yes	Yes	Yes	Yes	Yes	Yes	6	3	0	15
6	Kyle Brown	Yes	Yes	Yes	Yes	Yes	Yes	6	2	0	10
7	Branco du Preez	Maybe	Maybe	Maybe	Maybe	Maybe	Yes	6	1	1	7
8	Rosko Specman	Yes	Yes	Yes	Yes	Yes	Maybe	6	4	0	20
9	Justin Geduld	Yes	Yes	Yes	Yes	Yes	Maybe	6	3	11	37
10	Dewald Human	Maybe	Maybe				Yes	3	1	0	5
11	Siviwe Soyizwapi	Maybe	Yes	Yes	Yes	Yes	Yes	6	4	0	20
12	Muller du Plessis	Yes			Sent to blood bin	Sent to blood bin	Sent to blood bin	1	0	0	0
13	Selvyn Davids (reserve)					Maybe	Maybe	2	0	0	0
Total								6	21	12	129
Legend: indicates the player started the match, indicates the player came on as a replacement in the match and indicates a player was ruled out through injury.

=== Hamilton Sevens ===
The 2019 Hamilton Sevens took place from 26 to 27 January 2019. South Africa were drawn in Pool C of the competition, alongside France, Kenya and Scotland. They won all three matches in the pool stage to finish top of Pool C. They beat Samoa in their Cup quarter final, but lost to Fiji in the semi-finals, and to New Zealand in the bronze final to finish fourth in the tournament.

The Pool C log:

Pool C log
Pos	Team	P	W	D	L	PD	Pts
1	South Africa	3	3	0	0	+50	9
2	Scotland	3	2	0	1	−5	7
3	Kenya	3	1	0	2	−24	5
4	France	3	0	0	3	−21	3

The matches played were:

Pool C	26 January 2019	South Africa	29–10	Kenya	Hamilton
	10:22	Try: Kyle Brown 4'; Werner Kok 6'; Zain Davids 7'; Branco du Preez 9'; Stedman Gans 13'; Con: Branco du Preez 8'; Selvyn Davids 14'	Scoreboard	Try: Jacob Ojee 2'; Cyprian Kuto 11'	Referee: Matt Rodden

Pool C	26 January 2019	South Africa	17–5	France	Hamilton
	14:10	Try: Werner Kok 4'; Siviwe Soyizwapi 6'; Philip Snyman 13'; Con: Selvyn Davids 13'	Scoreboard	Try: Samuel Alerte 11'	Referee: Richard Kelly

Pool C	26 January 2019	South Africa	26–7	Scotland	Hamilton
	18:22	Try: Siviwe Soyizwapi 5', 14'; Branco du Preez 7'; Werner Kok 11'; Con: Branco du Preez 5'; Selvyn Davids 12', 15'	Scoreboard	Try: Sam Pecqueur 10'; Con: Robbie Fergusson 10'	Referee: Jérémy Rozier

Cup QF	27 January 2019	South Africa	28–19	Samoa	Hamilton
	11:58	Try: Chris Dry 7'; Dewald Human 9'; Werner Kok 12'; Selvyn Davids 13'; Con: Branco du Preez 8'; Selvyn Davids 10', 12', 14'	Scoreboard	Try: David Afamasaga 5'; Alatasi Tupou 10'; Danny Tusitala 15'; Con: Alatasi Tupou 6'; Danny Tusitala 15'	Referee: James Doleman

Cup SF	27 January 2019	Fiji	29–7	South Africa	Hamilton
	16:16	Try: Kalione Nasoko 1'; Aminiasi Tuimaba 5', 14'; Vilimoni Botitu 8'; Waisea Nacuqu 10'; Con: Waisea Nacuqu 2'; Vilimoni Botitu 6'	Scoreboard	Try: Selvyn Davids 13'; Con: Selvyn Davids 13'	Referee: Richard Kelly

Bronze F	27 January 2019	South Africa	7–29	New Zealand	Hamilton
	19:10	Try: Siviwe Soyizwapi 4'; Con: Selvyn Davids 5'	Scoreboard	Try: Tone Ng Shiu 6', 9'; Tim Mikkelson 9'; Joe Ravouvou 12'; Sam Dickson 14'; Con: Andrew Knewstubb 6', 9'	Referee: Sam Grove-White

The player record for the tournament is:

Player record
No	Player	KEN	FRA	SCO	SAM	FJI	NZL	Apps	Tries	Cons	Points
1	Chris Dry	Yes	Yes	Yes	Yes	Yes	Yes	6	1	0	5
2	Philip Snyman	Maybe	Maybe	Maybe	Maybe	Maybe	Maybe	6	1	0	5
3	Impi Visser	Maybe	Maybe	Yes	Maybe	Maybe	Yes	6	0	0	0
4	Zain Davids	Yes	Yes	Yes	Yes	Yes	Yes	6	1	0	5
5	Werner Kok	Yes	Yes	Yes	Yes	Yes	Maybe	6	4	0	20
6	Kyle Brown	Yes	Yes		Yes	Yes	Maybe	5	1	0	5
7	Branco du Preez	Yes	Yes	Yes	Yes	Yes		5	2	3	16
8	Selvyn Davids	Maybe	Maybe	Maybe	Maybe	Maybe	Yes	6	2	9	28
9	Justin Geduld	Maybe	Maybe	Maybe	Maybe	Maybe	Yes	6	0	0	0
10	Dewald Human	Yes	Yes	Yes	Yes	Yes		5	1	0	5
11	Siviwe Soyizwapi	Yes	Yes	Yes	Yes	Yes	Yes	6	4	0	20
12	Stedman Gans	Maybe	Maybe	Maybe	Maybe	Maybe	Yes	6	1	0	5
13	JC Pretorius (reserve)							0	0	0	0
Total								6	18	12	114
Legend: indicates the player started the match, indicates the player came on as a replacement in the match and indicates a player was ruled out through injury.

=== Sydney Sevens ===
The 2019 Sydney Sevens took place from 2 to 3 February 2019. South Africa were drawn in Pool D of the competition, alongside Argentina, Australia and Tonga. They beat Tonga and Argentina, and — despite losing their final match to Australia — finished top of Pool D. They lost to England in their Cup quarter final to drop into the 5th-place play-off. They beat Spain in the semi-final of that competition and beat Australia in the final to finish fifth in the tournament.

The Pool D log:

Pool D log
Pos	Team	P	W	D	L	PD	Pts
1	South Africa	3	2	0	1	+47	7
2	Australia	3	2	0	1	+25	7
3	Argentina	3	2	0	1	+22	7
4	Tonga	3	0	0	3	−94	3

The matches played were:

Pool D	2 February 2019	South Africa	45–5	Tonga	Sydney
	10:50	Try: Werner Kok 4', 9'; Siviwe Soyizwapi 7', 8'; Stedman Gans 11', 13'; Dewald Human 15'; Con: Branco du Preez 4', 7'; Selvyn Davids 9'; Dewald Human 11', 13'	Scoreboard	Try: Fine Inisi 2'	Referee: Matt Rodden

Pool D	2 February 2019	South Africa	25–10	Argentina	Sydney
	16:18	Try: Siviwe Soyizwapi 8', 9'; Selvyn Davids 11'; Justin Geduld 14'; Stedman Gans 15'	Scoreboard	Try: Renzo Barbier 5'; Rodrigo Etchart 12'	Referee: Sam Grove-White

Pool D	2 February 2019	South Africa	21–29	Australia	Sydney
	20:23	Try: Justin Geduld 7', 9'; Stedman Gans 11'; Con: Branco du Preez 7'; Selvyn Davids 9', 12'	Scoreboard	Try: Jeral Skelton 2'; Lewis Holland 3', 4'; Josh Coward 13'; Nick Malouf 16'; Con: John Porch 3'; Josh Coward 14'	Referee: Craig Evans

Cup QF	3 February 2019	South Africa	5–26	England	Sydney
	13:00	Try: Zain Davids 8'	Scoreboard	Try: Charlton Kerr 3'; Tom Mitchell 4'; Phil Burgess 12'; Tom Bowen 14'; Con: Dan Bibby 3', 5', 13'	Referee: Richard Kelly

5th SF	3 February 2019	South Africa	33–0	Spain	Sydney
	15:54	Try: Selvyn Davids 1', 7'; Siviwe Soyizwapi 11', 13'; Dewald Human 15'; Con: Selvyn Davids 2', 8'; Dewald Human 13', 15'	Scoreboard		Referee: Craig Evans

5th F	3 February 2019	Australia	10–12	South Africa	Sydney
	20:07	Try: John Porch 7'; Nick Malouf 11'	Scoreboard	Try: Selvyn Davids 2'; Kyle Brown 14'; Con: Justin Geduld 2'	Referee: Richard Haughton

The player record for the tournament is:

Player record
No	Player	TGA	ARG	AUS	ENG	ESP	AUS	Apps	Tries	Cons	Points
1	Chris Dry	Yes	Yes	Yes	Yes	Yes	Yes	6	0	0	0
2	Philip Snyman				Sent to blood bin	Sent to blood bin	Sent to blood bin	0	0	0	0
3	Impi Visser	Yes	Yes	Yes	Maybe	Maybe	Maybe	6	0	0	0
4	Zain Davids	Yes	Yes	Yes	Yes	Yes	Yes	6	1	0	5
5	Werner Kok	Yes	Yes	Yes	Yes	Yes	Maybe	6	2	0	10
6	JC Pretorius	Maybe	Maybe		Yes	Yes	Yes	5	0	0	0
7	Branco du Preez	Yes	Yes	Yes	Yes	Maybe	Maybe	6	0	3	6
8	Selvyn Davids	Maybe	Maybe	Maybe	Maybe	Yes	Yes	6	4	5	30
9	Justin Geduld	Yes	Yes	Yes	Yes	Yes	Yes	6	3	1	17
10	Dewald Human	Maybe	Maybe	Maybe	Maybe	Maybe	Maybe	6	2	4	18
11	Siviwe Soyizwapi	Yes	Yes	Yes	Yes	Yes	Yes	6	6	0	30
12	Stedman Gans	Maybe	Maybe	Maybe	Maybe	Maybe	Yes	6	4	0	20
13	Kyle Brown (reserve)				Maybe	Maybe	Maybe	3	1	0	5
Total								6	23	13	141
Legend: indicates the player started the match, indicates the player came on as a replacement in the match and indicates a player was ruled out through injury.

=== Las Vegas Sevens ===
The 2019 Las Vegas Sevens took place from 1 to 3 March 2019. South Africa were drawn in Pool C of the competition, alongside Chile, England and Japan. They beat Japan and England and drew against Chile to finish top of Pool C. They lost to the United States in their Cup quarter final to drop into the 5th-place play-off. They lost to Fiji in the semi-final of that competition to finish seventh/eighth in the tournament.

The Pool C log:

Pool C log
Pos	Team	P	W	D	L	PD	Pts
1	South Africa	3	2	1	0	+43	8
2	England	3	2	0	1	+24	7
3	Japan	3	1	0	2	−33	5
4	Chile	3	0	1	2	−34	4

The matches played were:

Pool C	1 March 2019	South Africa	26–0	Japan	Las Vegas
	17:12	Try: Branco du Preez 7'; Impi Visser 8'; Selvyn Davids 12'; Mfundo Ndhlovu 15'; Con: Branco du Preez 7'; Selvyn Davids 12', 15'	Scoreboard		Referee: Francisco González

Pool C	1 March 2019	South Africa	5–5	Chile	Las Vegas
	20:13	Try: Branco du Preez 4'	Scoreboard	Try: Benjamin De Vidts 11'	Referee: Paulo Duarte

Pool C	2 March 2019	England	12–29	South Africa	Las Vegas
	14:10	Try: Tom Bowen 6'; Charlton Kerr 13'; Con: William Edwards 14'	Scoreboard	Try: Philip Snyman 2'; Siviwe Soyizwapi 8'; Justin Geduld 9'; JC Pretorius 11'; Selvyn Davids 15'; Con: Branco du Preez 10'; Selvyn Davids 15'	Referee: Richard Kelly

Cup QF	2 March 2019	South Africa	10–29	United States	Las Vegas
	18:10	Try: JC Pretorius 13'; Stedman Gans 15'	Scoreboard	Try: Danny Barrett 2'; Stephen Tomasin 4'; Martin Iosefo 6'; Carlin Isles 9'; Matai Leuta 10'; Con: Madison Hughes 5', 7'	Referee: Richard Kelly

5th SF	3 March 2019	Fiji	14–12	South Africa	Las Vegas
	12:28	Try: Josua Vakurunabili 1'; Kalione Nasoko 7'; Con: Vilimoni Botitu 2', 8'	Scoreboard	Try: Ryan Oosthuizen 4'; JC Pretorius 11'; Con: Selvyn Davids 11'	Referee: Jérémy Rozier

The player record for the tournament is:

Player record
No	Player	JPN	CHL	ENG	USA	FJI		Apps	Tries	Cons	Points
1	Ryan Oosthuizen	Yes	Yes	Yes	Yes	Yes	—N/a	5	1	0	5
2	Philip Snyman	Yes	Yes	Yes	Yes	Yes	—N/a	5	1	0	5
3	Impi Visser	Yes	Yes	Yes	Yes	Yes	—N/a	5	1	0	5
4	Sako Makata	Maybe	Maybe	Maybe	Maybe	Maybe	—N/a	5	0	0	0
5	Werner Kok	Yes	Yes	Yes	Yes	Yes	—N/a	5	0	0	0
6	JC Pretorius	Maybe	Maybe	Maybe	Maybe	Maybe	—N/a	5	3	0	15
7	Branco du Preez	Yes	Yes	Yes	Yes	Yes	—N/a	5	2	2	14
8	Selvyn Davids	Maybe	Maybe	Maybe	Maybe	Maybe	—N/a	5	2	4	18
9	Justin Geduld	Yes	Yes	Yes	Yes	Yes	—N/a	5	1	0	5
10	Stedman Gans	Maybe	Maybe	Maybe	Maybe	Maybe	—N/a	5	1	0	5
11	Siviwe Soyizwapi	Yes	Yes	Yes	Yes	Yes	—N/a	5	1	0	5
12	Mfundo Ndhlovu	Maybe	Maybe	Maybe	Maybe	Sent to blood bin	—N/a	4	1	0	5
13	Muller du Plessis (reserve)					Maybe	—N/a	1	0	0	0
Total								5	14	6	82
Legend: indicates the player started the match, indicates the player came on as a replacement in the match and indicates a player was ruled out through injury.

=== Vancouver Sevens ===
The 2019 Vancouver Sevens took place from 9 to 10 March 2019. South Africa were drawn in Pool A of the competition, alongside Chile, the United States and Wales. They beat Chile, Wales and the United States to finish top of Pool A. They beat Argentina in their Cup quarter final, Fiji in their Cup semi-final and France in the final to win the tournament.

The Pool A log:

Pool A log
Pos	Team	P	W	D	L	PD	Pts
1	South Africa	3	3	0	0	+64	9
2	United States	3	2	0	1	+28	7
3	Wales	3	1	0	2	−28	5
4	Chile	3	0	0	3	−64	3

The matches played were:

Pool A	9 March 2019	South Africa	43–0	Chile	Vancouver
	11:23	Try: JC Pretorius 1', 12'; Siviwe Soyizwapi 2', 6'; Selvyn Davids 5', 10'; Muller du Plessis 15'; Con: Selvyn Davids 1', 5', 6', 13'	Scoreboard		Referee: Craig Evans

Pool A	9 March 2019	South Africa	19–10	Wales	Vancouver
	14:52	Try: Philip Snyman 4'; Selvyn Davids 7'; JC Pretorius 9'; Con: Selvyn Davids 8', 10'	Scoreboard	Try: Ben Cambriani 1'; Ben Roach 13'	Referee: Jordan Way

Pool A	9 March 2019	United States	7–19	South Africa	Vancouver
	18:46	Try: Stephen Tomasin 11'; Con: Madison Hughes 12'	Scoreboard	Try: JC Pretorius 2', 13'; Stedman Gans 5'; Con: Selvyn Davids 2', 6'	Referee: Richard Kelly

Cup QF	10 March 2019	South Africa	33–12	Argentina	Vancouver
	11:08	Try: Justin Geduld 2'; Siviwe Soyizwapi 7', 8'; Muller du Plessis 9'; Stedman Gans 11'; Con: Selvyn Davids 3', 8', 9'; Branco du Preez 12'	Scoreboard	Try: Fernando Luna 1'; Francisco Ulloa 14'; Con: Santiago Mare 1'	Referee: Richard Kelly

Cup SF	10 March 2019	South Africa	31–12	Fiji	Vancouver
	15:08	Try: Stedman Gans 6'; Selvyn Davids 7'; Justin Geduld 10'; Muller du Plessis 12', 14'; Con: Selvyn Davids 7', 8', 13'	Scoreboard	Try: Aminiasi Tuimaba 4'; Jerry Tuwai 15'; Con: Terio Veilawa 16'	Referee: Richard Kelly

Cup F	10 March 2019	South Africa	21–12	France	Vancouver
	18:19	Try: Impi Visser 6'; Werner Kok 8'; Selvyn Davids 10'; Con: Selvyn Davids 7', 9', 11'	Scoreboard	Try: Pierre Gilles Lakafia 3'; Stephen Parez 10'; Con: Jean-Pascal Barraque 10'	Referee: Craig Evans

The player record for the tournament is:

Player record
No	Player	CHL	WAL	USA	ARG	FJI	FRA	Apps	Tries	Cons	Points
1	Zain Davids	Maybe	Maybe	Maybe	Maybe	Yes	Yes	6	0	0	0
2	Philip Snyman	Yes	Yes	Yes	Yes	Sent to blood bin	Sent to blood bin	4	1	0	5
3	Impi Visser	Yes	Yes	Yes	Yes	Yes	Yes	6	1	0	5
4	Sako Makata	Maybe	Maybe	Maybe	Maybe			4	0	0	0
5	Werner Kok	Yes	Yes		Maybe	Maybe	Maybe	5	1	0	5
6	JC Pretorius	Yes	Yes	Yes	Yes	Yes	Yes	6	5	0	25
7	Branco du Preez	Maybe	Maybe	Maybe	Maybe	Maybe	Maybe	6	0	1	2
8	Selvyn Davids	Yes	Yes	Yes	Yes	Yes	Yes	6	5	17	59
9	Justin Geduld	Yes	Yes	Yes	Yes	Yes	Yes	6	2	0	10
10	Stedman Gans	Maybe	Maybe	Yes	Yes	Yes	Yes	6	3	0	15
11	Siviwe Soyizwapi	Yes	Yes	Yes	Yes	Yes	Yes	6	4	0	20
12	Muller du Plessis	Maybe	Maybe	Maybe	Maybe	Maybe	Maybe	6	4	0	20
13	Kurt-Lee Arendse (reserve)					Maybe		1	0	0	0
Total								6	26	18	166
Legend: indicates the player started the match, indicates the player came on as a replacement in the match and indicates a player was ruled out through injury.

=== Hong Kong Sevens ===
The 2019 Hong Kong Sevens took place from 5 to 7 April 2019. South Africa were drawn in Pool A of the competition, alongside Japan, Samoa and Scotland. They beat all three teams to finish top of Pool A. They lost to the United States in their Cup quarter final to drop into the 5th-place play-off. They lost to Argentina in the semi-final of that competition to finish seventh/eighth in the tournament.

The Pool A log:

Pool A log
Pos	Team	P	W	D	L	PD	Pts
1	South Africa	3	3	0	0	+45	9
2	Samoa	3	2	0	1	+6	7
3	Scotland	3	1	0	2	−12	5
4	Japan	3	0	0	3	−39	3

The matches played were:

Pool A	5 April 2019	South Africa	22–7	Japan	Hong Kong
	18:06	Try: Werner Kok 3', 9'; Justin Geduld 10'; Siviwe Soyizwapi 12'; Con: Selvyn Davids 9'	Scoreboard	Try: Siosifa Lisala 1'; Con: Katsuyuki Sakai 2'	Referee: Paulo Duarte

Pool A	6 April 2019	South Africa	26–10	Scotland	Hong Kong
	11:41	Try: Selvyn Davids 6'; Stedman Gans 9'; Ryan Oosthuizen 9'; Branco du Preez 11'; Con: Selvyn Davids 7'; Justin Geduld 10'; Branco du Preez 11'	Scoreboard	Try: Jamie Farndale 13'; Tom Brown 14'	Referee: Richard Kelly

Pool A	6 April 2019	South Africa	21–7	Samoa	Hong Kong
	15:22	Try: Impi Visser 4'; Justin Geduld 9'; Werner Kok 12'; Con: Branco du Preez 5', 10'; Selvyn Davids 12'	Scoreboard	Try: Tomasi Alosio 15'; Con: Murphy Paulo 16'	Referee: James Doleman

Cup QF	7 April 2019	South Africa	12–21	United States	Hong Kong
	10:58	Try: Impi Visser 2', 8'; Con: Selvyn Davids 2'	Scoreboard	Try: Carlin Isles 4', 8'; Ben Pinkelman 10'; Con: Madison Hughes 5', 9', 11'	Referee: James Doleman

5th SF	7 April 2019	South Africa	17–19	Argentina	Hong Kong
	14:55	Try: Siviwe Soyizwapi 2'; Branco du Preez 5'; Kurt-Lee Arendse 9'; Con: Branco du Preez 5'	Scoreboard	Try: Santiago Álvarez 8'; Lautaro Bazan Velez 13'; Matías Osadczuk 14'; Con: Santiago Mare 8', 14'	Referee: Craig Evans

The player record for the tournament is:

Player record
No	Player	JPN	SCO	SAM	USA	ARG		Apps	Tries	Cons	Points
1	Chris Dry	Maybe	Maybe	Maybe	Maybe	Yes	—N/a	5	0	0	0
2	Sako Makata		Maybe	Maybe		Maybe	—N/a	3	0	0	0
3	Impi Visser	Yes	Yes	Yes	Yes	Sent to blood bin	—N/a	4	3	0	15
4	Ryan Oosthuizen	Yes	Yes	Yes	Yes	Yes	—N/a	5	1	0	5
5	Werner Kok	Yes	Yes	Yes	Yes	Yes	—N/a	5	3	0	15
6	Kurt-Lee Arendse	Maybe	Maybe	Maybe	Maybe	Maybe	—N/a	5	1	0	5
7	Branco du Preez	Maybe	Maybe	Yes	Maybe	Yes	—N/a	5	2	4	18
8	Selvyn Davids	Yes	Yes	Maybe	Yes	Maybe	—N/a	5	1	4	13
9	Justin Geduld	Yes	Yes	Yes	Yes	Yes	—N/a	5	2	1	12
10	Stedman Gans	Yes	Yes	Yes	Yes	Yes	—N/a	5	1	0	5
11	Siviwe Soyizwapi	Yes	Yes	Yes	Yes	Yes	—N/a	5	2	0	10
12	Angelo Davids	Maybe	Maybe	Maybe	Maybe	Maybe	—N/a	5	0	0	0
13	James Murphy (reserve)					Maybe	—N/a	1	0	0	0
Total								5	16	9	98
Legend: indicates the player started the match, indicates the player came on as a replacement in the match and indicates a player was ruled out through injury.

=== Singapore Sevens ===
The 2019 Singapore Sevens took place from 13 to 14 April 2019. South Africa were drawn in Pool A of the competition, alongside Canada, Fiji and Scotland. They beat all three sides to finish top of Pool A. They beat Samoa in their Cup quarter final, the United States in their Cup semi-final and Fiji in the final to win the tournament.

The Pool A log:

Pool A log
Pos	Team	P	W	D	L	PD	Pts
1	South Africa	3	3	0	0	+72	9
2	Fiji	3	1	0	2	+21	5
3	Scotland	3	1	0	2	−42	5
4	Canada	3	1	0	2	−51	5

The matches played were:

Pool A	13 April 2019	South Africa	36–10	Scotland	Singapore
	12:14	Try: Branco du Preez 4'; Werner Kok 6'; Impi Visser 8'; Siviwe Soyizwapi 10', 12'; Angelo Davids 13'; Con: Branco du Preez 6', 9'; Selvyn Davids 10'	Scoreboard	Try: Max McFarland 2', 8'	Referee: Richard Kelly

Pool A	13 April 2019	South Africa	36–0	Canada	Singapore
	15:40	Try: Justin Geduld 5'; Ryan Oosthuizen 10'; Siviwe Soyizwapi 8'; Kurt-Lee Arendse 10', 12'; Sako Makata 11'; Con: Branco du Preez 10'; Selvyn Davids 12', 13'	Scoreboard		Referee: Craig Evans

Pool A	13 April 2019	Fiji	7–17	South Africa	Singapore
	19:28	Try: Livai Ikanikoda 10'; Con: Vilimoni Botitu 10'	Scoreboard	Try: Stedman Gans 6'; Kurt-Lee Arendse 11'; Werner Kok 13'; Con: Selvyn Davids 12'	Referee: James Doleman

Cup QF	14 April 2019	South Africa	21–12	Samoa	Singapore
	11:30	Try: Impi Visser 7'; Justin Geduld 9'; Selvyn Davids 11'; Con: Branco du Preez 8'; Selvyn Davids 10', 12'	Scoreboard	Try: Melani Matavao 3', 5'; Con: Tila Mealoi 5'	Referee: James Doleman

Cup SF	14 April 2019	South Africa	24–12	United States	Singapore
	15:50	Try: Siviwe Soyizwapi 1'; Stedman Gans 5'; Impi Visser 11' penalty try 14'; Con: Branco du Preez 2'	Scoreboard	Try: Stephen Tomasin 9'; Joe Schroeder 14'; Con: Madison Hughes 15'	Referee: Craig Evans

Cup F	14 April 2019	South Africa	20–19	Fiji	Singapore
	19:00	Try: Kurt-Lee Arendse 10'; Angelo Davids 11'; Ryan Oosthuizen 12'; Con: Selvyn Davids 12'; Pen: Selvyn Davids 14'	Scoreboard	Try: Aminiasi Tuimaba 2'; Napolioni Bolaca 5'; Vilimoni Botitu 7'; Con: Napolioni Bolaca 3', 7'	Referee: Richard Kelly

The player record for the tournament is:

Player record
No	Player	SCO	CAN	FJI	SAM	USA	FJI	Apps	Tries	Cons	Pens	Points
1	Chris Dry	Maybe	Maybe	Maybe	Maybe	Maybe	Maybe	6	0	0	0	0
2	Sako Makata	Maybe	Maybe	Maybe	Maybe			4	1	0	0	5
3	Impi Visser	Yes	Yes	Yes	Yes	Yes	Yes	6	3	0	0	15
4	Ryan Oosthuizen	Yes	Yes	Yes	Yes	Yes	Yes	6	2	0	0	10
5	Werner Kok	Yes	Yes	Yes	Yes	Yes	Yes	6	2	0	0	10
6	Kurt-Lee Arendse	Maybe	Maybe	Maybe	Maybe	Maybe	Maybe	6	4	0	0	20
7	Branco du Preez	Yes	Yes	Yes	Yes	Yes	Yes	6	1	5	0	15
8	Selvyn Davids	Maybe	Maybe	Maybe	Maybe	Maybe	Maybe	6	1	7	1	22
9	Justin Geduld	Yes	Yes	Yes	Yes	Yes	Yes	6	2	0	0	10
10	Stedman Gans	Yes	Yes	Yes	Yes	Yes	Yes	6	2	0	0	10
11	Siviwe Soyizwapi	Yes	Yes	Yes	Yes	Yes	Sent to blood bin	5	4	0	0	20
12	Angelo Davids	Maybe	Maybe	Maybe	Maybe	Maybe	Yes	6	2	0	0	10
13	James Murphy (reserve)							0	0	0	0	0
	penalty try							—	1	—	—	7
Total								6	25	12	1	154
Legend: indicates the player started the match, indicates the player came on as a replacement in the match and indicates a player was ruled out through injury.

=== London Sevens ===
The 2019 London Sevens took place from 25 to 26 May 2019. South Africa were drawn in Pool A of the competition, alongside Argentina, Canada and Japan. They beat all three teams to finish top of Pool A. They lost to Australia in their Cup quarter final to drop into the 5th-place play-off. They lost to New Zealand in the semi-final of that competition to finish seventh/eighth in the tournament.

The Pool A log:

Pool A log
Pos	Team	P	W	D	L	PD	Pts
1	South Africa	3	3	0	0	+99	9
2	Canada	3	2	0	1	−10	7
3	Argentina	3	1	0	2	+8	5
4	Japan	3	0	0	3	−97	3

The matches played were:

Pool A	25 May 2019	South Africa	49–0	Japan	London
	11:20	Try: Kurt-Lee Arendse 2', 13'; Branco du Preez 4'; Justin Geduld 5'; Siviwe Soyizwapi 7'; Selvyn Davids 10'; Sako Makata 15'; Con: Branco du Preez 3', 4', 6', 7'; Selvyn Davids 10', 13', 16'	Scoreboard		Referee: Tevita Rokovereni

Pool A	25 May 2019	South Africa	45–14	Canada	London
	14:26	Try: Werner Kok 1', 11'; Kurt-Lee Arendse 5'; Siviwe Soyizwapi 8'; JC Pretorius 9'; Impi Visser 14'; Selvyn Davids 15'; Con: Branco du Preez 2', 6'; Selvyn Davids 10', 14', 15'	Scoreboard	Try: Matt Mullins 4'; Luke McCloskey 7'; Con: Nathan Hirayama 4', 8'	Referee: Sam Grove-White

Pool A	25 May 2019	South Africa	40–21	Argentina	London
	17:32	Try: Siviwe Soyizwapi 3', 7'; Kurt-Lee Arendse 6'; Stedman Gans 9'; Muller du Plessis 10'; Werner Kok 14'; Con: Branco du Preez 4', 6', 8'; Selvyn Davids 9', 15'	Scoreboard	Try: Germán Schulz 5'; Franco Sábato 12', 13'; Con: Lautaro Bazan Velez 5'; Gastón Revol 12'; Francisco Ulloa 13'	Referee: Paulo Duarte

Cup QF	26 May 2019	South Africa	22–29	Australia	London
	10:58	Try: Siviwe Soyizwapi 5'; Justin Geduld 7'; Muller du Plessis 14'; JC Pretorius 15'; Con: Branco du Preez 6'	Scoreboard	Try: Henry Hutchison 1', 9'; Joe Pincus 3'; Matt Hood 8'; Ben O'Donnell 10'; Con: Lewis Holland 1'; Josh Coward 9'	Referee: Sam Grove-White

5th SF	26 May 2019	South Africa	17–21	New Zealand	London
	14:04	Try: Muller du Plessis 4', 7'; Stedman Gans 13'; Con: Selvyn Davids 13'	Scoreboard	Try: Sione Molia 2'; Andrew Knewstubb 10'; Tim Mikkelson 15'; Con: Vilimoni Koroi 3'; Andrew Knewstubb 10'; Tim Mikkelson 15'	Referee: Jérémy Rozier

The player record for the tournament is:

Player record
No	Player	JPN	CAN	ARG	AUS	NZL		Apps	Tries	Cons	Points
1	Ryan Oosthuizen	Yes	Yes	Yes	Yes	Yes	—N/a	5	0	0	0
2	Sako Makata	Maybe	Maybe	Maybe	Maybe	Maybe	—N/a	5	1	0	5
3	Impi Visser	Yes	Yes	Yes	Yes	Yes	—N/a	5	1	0	5
4	Kurt-Lee Arendse	Yes	Yes	Yes	Yes	Sent to blood bin	—N/a	4	4	0	20
5	Werner Kok	Yes	Yes	Yes	Yes	Maybe	—N/a	5	3	0	15
6	JC Pretorius	Maybe	Maybe	Maybe	Maybe	Maybe	—N/a	5	2	0	10
7	Branco du Preez	Yes	Yes	Yes	Yes	Yes	—N/a	5	1	10	25
8	Selvyn Davids	Maybe	Maybe	Maybe	Maybe	Maybe	—N/a	5	2	9	28
9	Justin Geduld	Yes	Yes	Yes	Yes	Yes	—N/a	5	2	0	10
10	Stedman Gans	Maybe	Maybe	Maybe	Maybe	Yes	—N/a	5	2	0	10
11	Siviwe Soyizwapi	Yes	Yes	Yes	Yes	Maybe	—N/a	5	5	0	25
12	Muller du Plessis	Maybe	Maybe	Maybe	Maybe	Yes	—N/a	5	4	0	20
13	Philip Snyman (reserve)					Yes	—N/a	1	0	0	0
Total								5	27	19	173
Legend: indicates the player started the match, indicates the player came on as a replacement in the match and indicates a player was ruled out through injury.

=== Paris Sevens ===
The 2019 Paris Sevens took place from 1 to 2 June 2019. South Africa were drawn in Pool B of the competition, alongside Australia, Kenya and Wales. They beat all three sides to finish top of Pool B. They beat Samoa in their Cup quarter final, but lost to New Zealand in their Cup semi-final. They finished in third place after beating the United States in the bronze final.

The Pool B log:

Pool B log
Pos	Team	P	W	D	L	PD	Pts
1	South Africa	3	3	0	0	+34	9
2	Kenya	3	1	1	1	−12	6
3	Wales	3	1	0	2	−3	5
4	Australia	3	0	1	2	−19	4

The matches played were:

Pool B	1 June 2019	South Africa	22–7	Wales	Paris
	11:44	Try: Muller du Plessis 6'; Cecil Afrika 8'; Branco du Preez 10'; Mfundo Ndhlovu 14'; Con: Branco du Preez 7'	Scoreboard	Try: Joe Goodchild 12'; Con: Ethan Davies 12'	Referee: Tevita Rokovereni

Pool B	1 June 2019	South Africa	29–12	Kenya	Paris
	15:10	Try: Muller du Plessis 2', 10'; Siviwe Soyizwapi 4'; Impi Visser 12'; Mfundo Ndhlovu 13'; Con: Dewald Human 12', 13'	Scoreboard	Try: Jacob Ojee 6'; Andrew Amonde 9'; Con: Michael Wanjala 10'	Referee: Paulo Duarte

Pool B	1 June 2019	Australia	17–19	South Africa	Paris
	18:58	Try: Matt Hood 7'; Maurice Longbottom 8'; Will Maddocks 13'; Con: Lewis Holland 13'	Scoreboard	Try: Justin Geduld 1'; JC Pretorius 3'; Impi Visser 10'; Con: Branco du Preez 1', 3'	Referee: Richard Kelly

Cup QF	2 June 2019	South Africa	40–7	Samoa	Paris
	12:34	Try: Justin Geduld 2', 8'; Branco du Preez 3'; Werner Kok 5'; Muller du Plessis 8'; Philip Snyman 14'; Con: Branco du Preez 3', 6', 8', 9'; Dewald Human 14'	Scoreboard	Try: Alamanda Motuga 16'; Con: Paulo Toilolo Fanuasa 17'	Referee: Sam Grove-White

Cup SF	2 June 2019	New Zealand	33–7	South Africa	Paris
	15:45	Try: Regan Ware 2', 6'; Jona Nareki 7'; Andrew Knewstubb 12'; Amanaki Nicole 14'; Con: Andrew Knewstubb 3', 6', 7', 12'	Scoreboard	Try: Cecil Afrika 10'; Con: Dewald Human 10'	Referee: Jérémy Rozier

Bronze F	2 June 2019	United States	7–24	South Africa	Paris
	18:08	Try: Perry Baker 3'; Con: Madison Hughes 3'	Scoreboard	Try: Muller du Plessis 6', 14'; Ryan Oosthuizen 9'; Philip Snyman 11'; Con: Dewald Human 9', 14'	Referee: Jordan Way

The player record for the tournament is:

Player record
No	Player	WAL	KEN	AUS	SAM	NZL	USA	Apps	Tries	Cons	Points
1	Ryan Oosthuizen	Maybe	Maybe	Maybe	Maybe	Maybe	Yes	6	1	0	5
2	Sako Makata	Yes	Yes	Yes	Sent to blood bin	Sent to blood bin	Sent to blood bin	3	0	0	0
3	Impi Visser	Maybe	Maybe	Maybe	Yes	Yes	Sent to blood bin	5	2	0	10
4	Mfundo Ndhlovu	Maybe	Maybe	Maybe	Sent to blood bin	Sent to blood bin	Sent to blood bin	3	2	0	10
5	Werner Kok	Yes	Yes	Yes	Yes	Yes	Yes	6	1	0	5
6	JC Pretorius	Yes	Yes	Yes	Yes	Yes	Yes	6	1	0	5
7	Branco du Preez	Yes	Yes	Yes	Yes	Yes	Maybe	6	2	7	24
8	Dewald Human	Maybe	Maybe	Maybe	Maybe	Maybe	Yes	6	0	6	12
9	Justin Geduld	Yes	Yes	Yes	Yes	Yes	Maybe	6	3	0	15
10	Cecil Afrika	Maybe	Maybe	Maybe	Maybe	Maybe	Yes	6	2	0	10
11	Siviwe Soyizwapi	Yes	Yes	Yes	Yes	Yes	Yes	6	1	0	5
12	Muller du Plessis	Yes	Yes	Yes	Yes	Yes	Yes	6	6	0	30
13	Philip Snyman (reserve)				Maybe	Maybe	Maybe	3	2	0	10
Total								6	23	13	141
Legend: indicates the player started the match, indicates the player came on as a replacement in the match and indicates a player was ruled out through injury.

== Player statistics ==
The appearance record for players that represented the South Africa national rugby sevens team in 2018–19 is as follows:

2018–2019 South Africa World Rugby Sevens player statistics
Player	Dubai	Cape Town	Hamilton	Sydney	Las Vegas	Vancouver	Hong Kong	Singapore	London	Paris	Season Total			Career Total		
Player	Dubai	Cape Town	Hamilton	Sydney	Las Vegas	Vancouver	Hong Kong	Singapore	London	Paris	T	M	P	T	M	P
Cecil Afrika										Yes	1	6	10	62	324	1,440
Kurt-Lee Arendse						Yes	Yes	Yes	Yes		4	16	45	4	16	45
Kyle Brown	Yes	Yes	Yes	Yes							4	20	25	69	347	445
Angelo Davids							Yes	Yes			2	11	10	2	11	10
Selvyn Davids	Yes	Yes	Yes	Yes	Yes	Yes	Yes	Yes	Yes		9	44	203	14	69	300
Zain Davids	Yes	Yes	Yes	Yes		Yes					5	28	15	18	88	60
Chris Dry			Yes	Yes			Yes	Yes			4	23	5	68	342	465
Muller du Plessis	Yes	Yes			Yes	Yes			Yes	Yes	6	24	100	10	44	155
Branco du Preez	Yes	Yes	Yes	Yes	Yes	Yes	Yes	Yes	Yes	Yes	10	55	140	71	361	1,302
Stedman Gans			Yes	Yes	Yes	Yes	Yes	Yes	Yes		7	39	70	18	85	130
Justin Geduld	Yes	Yes	Yes	Yes	Yes	Yes	Yes	Yes	Yes	Yes	10	53	118	46	239	951
Dewald Human	Yes	Yes	Yes	Yes						Yes	5	25	48	9	43	114
Werner Kok	Yes	Yes	Yes	Yes	Yes	Yes	Yes	Yes	Yes	Yes	10	56	110	47	240	530
Sako Makata					Yes	Yes	Yes	Yes	Yes	Yes	6	24	10	6	24	10
James Murphy							Yes				1	1	0	3	12	0
Mfundo Ndhlovu					Yes					Yes	2	7	15	4	17	25
Ryan Oosthuizen	Yes	Yes			Yes		Yes	Yes	Yes	Yes	7	38	30	17	83	85
JC Pretorius				Yes	Yes	Yes			Yes	Yes	5	27	55	5	27	55
Philip Snyman	Yes	Yes	Yes	Yes	Yes	Yes			Yes	Yes	8	28	30	61	276	376
Siviwe Soyizwapi	Yes	Yes	Yes	Yes	Yes	Yes	Yes	Yes	Yes	Yes	10	56	165	28	145	445
Rosko Specman	Yes	Yes									2	12	37	28	150	380
Impi Visser	Yes	Yes	Yes	Yes	Yes	Yes	Yes	Yes	Yes	Yes	10	55	65	10	55	65
indicates a player was a playing member of the squad for the relevant tournament.

== See also ==
- South Africa national rugby sevens team
- 2018–19 World Rugby Sevens Series
