= 2019 Canada Sevens =

- 2018–19 World Series
- Host nation: Canada
- Date: 9–10 March 2019

Cup
- Champion: South Africa
- Runner-up: France
- Third: Fiji

Challenge Trophy
- Winner: Australia

Tournament details
- Matches played: 45
- Tries scored: 295 (average 6.56 per match)
- Most points: Connor Braid (59)
- Most tries: Simon Kennewell (8)

The 2019 Canada Sevens was the fourth edition of the Canada Sevens tournament, and the sixth tournament of the 2018–19 World Rugby Sevens Series. The tournament was played on 9–10 March at BC Place in Vancouver.

== Format ==
The teams are drawn into four pools of four teams each. Each team plays every other team in their pool once. The top two teams from each pool advance to the Cup bracket where teams compete for the gold, silver, and bronze medals. The bottom two teams from each group go to the Challenge Trophy bracket.

== Teams ==
Fifteen core teams played in the tournament along with one invitational team, the winner of the 2019 Sudamérica Rugby Sevens, Chile:

- Argentina
- Australia
- Canada
- Chile
- England
- Fiji
- France
- Japan
- Kenya
- New Zealand
- Samoa
- Scotland
- South Africa
- Spain
- United States
- Wales

== Pool stage ==
All times in Pacific Standard Time (UTC−08:00).

=== Pool A ===
Team	Pld	W	D	L	PF	PA	PD	Pts
South Africa	3	3	0	0	81	17	+64	9
United States	3	2	0	1	80	52	+28	7
Wales	3	1	0	2	43	71	–28	5
Chile	3	0	0	3	31	95	–64	3

9 March 2019
11:20

South Africa	43–0	Chile
Try: Pretorius (2) 0'c, 11'c Soyizwapi (2) 1'm, 5'c S. Davids (2) 4'c, 9'm du Plessis 14'm Con: S. Davids (4/7) 0', 4', 5', 12'

BC Place, Vancouver
Referee: Craig Evans (Wales)

9 March 2019
11:42

United States	40–14	Wales
Try: Isles (3) 2'c, 5'c, 9'm Iosefo 7'c Hughes 11'c Tupuola 14'c Con: Williams (2/2) 3', 5'; Niua (1/2) 7'; Hughes (2/2) 11', 14'		Try: Bagshaw 1'c Smith 7'c Con: Davies (1/1) 1'; Treharne (1/1) 7'

BC Place, Vancouver
Referee: Sam Grove-White (Scotland)

9 March 2019
14:52

South Africa	19–10	Wales
Try: Snyman 3'm S. Davids 6'c Pretorius 8'c Con: S. Davids (2/3) 7', 9'		Try: Cambriani 0'm Roach 12'm Con: Treharne (0/2)

BC Place, Vancouver
Referee: Jordan Way (Australia)

9 March 2019
15:14

United States	33–19	Chile
Try: Williams 4'c Pinkelman 8'c Isles (2) 10'm, 12'c Tomasin 14'c Con: Hughes (3/4) 5', 8', 13', 14'		Try: De Vidts (2) 1'm, 3'c Fernández 7'; Con: Fernández (1/2) 3', 7'

BC Place, Vancouver
Referee: Damián Schneider (Argentina)

9 March 2019
18:24

Chile	12–19	Wales
Try: Blanc 6'c De Vidts 7'm Con: Fernández (1/2) 6'		Try: Davies 1'c Rogers 8'c Jenkins 9'm Con: Davies (2/3) 2', 9'

BC Place, Vancouver
Referee: Francisco González (Uruguay)

9 March 2019
18:46

United States	7–19	South Africa
Try: Tomasin 10'c Con: Hughes (1/1) 11'		Try: Pretorius (2) 1'c, 12'm Gans 4'c Con: S. Davids (2/2) 1', 5'; Du Preez (0/1)

BC Place, Vancouver
Referee: Richard Kelly (New Zealand)

=== Pool B ===
Team	Pld	W	D	L	PF	PA	PD	Pts
Samoa	3	2	0	1	90	50	+40	7
Fiji	3	2	0	1	86	55	+31	7
Canada	3	2	0	1	69	78	–9	7
Kenya	3	0	0	3	45	107	–62	3

9 March 2019
10:36

Fiji	36–12	Kenya
Try: Mocenacagi (2) 0'm, 12'c Naduva (2) 2'c, 6'm Tuwai 7'; Veilawa 10'c Con: Botitu (1/3) 3'; Veilawa (2/2) 11', 12'		Try: Olindi 9'm Onyala 11'c Con: Taabu (1/2) 11'

BC Place, Vancouver
Referee: Damián Schneider (Argentina)

9 March 2019
10:58

Samoa	38–7	Canada
Try: Vaili (2) 1'c, 7'c Afamasaga 8'c Mealoi 9'm Paulo 11'c Perez 13'm Con: Mealoi (3/4) 1', 7', 8'; Paulo (1/2) 11'		Try: Fuailefau 5'c Con: Hirayama (1/1) 5'

BC Place, Vancouver
Referee: Jordan Way (Australia)

9 March 2019
14:08

Fiji	19–26	Canada
Try: Veilawa 4'c Mocenacagi 6'c Tuimaba 10'c Con: Veilawa (2/3) 4', 10'		Try: Mullins 1'm Braid 2'c Fuailefau 8'c Jones 11'c Con: Hirayama (2/3) 3', 9', 11'

BC Place, Vancouver
Referee: Craig Evans (Wales)

9 March 2019
14:30

Samoa	35–12	Kenya
Try: Perez (2) 0'c, 6'c Motuga (2) 2'c, 14'; Vaili 4'c Con: Mealoi (4/4) 0', 3', 5', 7', 14'		Try: Taabu (2) 9'c Con: Taabu (1/1) 9'; Wanjala (0/1)

BC Place, Vancouver
Referee: Paulo Duarte (Portugal)

9 March 2019
17:40

Kenya	21–36	Canada
Try: Kuto (2) 6'c, 7'; Taabu 14'c Con: Taabu (2/2) 6', 7'; Olindi 14'		Try: Mullins 0'm Braid (3) 2'c, 5'c, 9'c Cejvanovic 10'm Berna 13'm Con: Braid (3/5) 3', 5', 9'; Kay (0/1)

BC Place, Vancouver
Referee: Sam Grove-White (Scotland)

9 March 2019
18:02

Samoa	17–31	Fiji
Try: Tuimaba 1'c Mocenacagi 5'c Naduva 7'm Tuwai 8'c Veilawa 10'm Con: Veilawa (3/5) 1', 5', 8'		Try: Samuelu 3'm Motuga 9'c Vaili 14'm Con: Tusitala (1/2) 10' Mealoi (0/1)

BC Place, Vancouver
Referee: Jérémy Rozier (France)

=== Pool C ===
Team	Pld	W	D	L	PF	PA	PD	Pts
New Zealand	3	2	0	1	105	45	+60	7
France	3	2	0	1	54	72	–18	7
Australia	3	1	0	2	46	71	–25	5
Spain	3	1	0	2	50	67	–17	5

9 March 2019
9:52

Australia	17–14	Spain
Try: Malouf 4'm Kennewell (2) 7'm, 8'c Con: Porch (1/3) 9'		Try: Carrión 2'c Alonso 12'c Con: Hernández (2/2) 3', 12'

BC Place, Vancouver
Referee: Jérémy Rozier (France)

9 March 2019
10:14

New Zealand	45–7	France
Try: Molia 1'c Koroi 5'c Ravouvou 6'm Mikkelson 9'c Dickson 10'c Knewstubb 13'c Ng Shiu 14'm Con: Koroi (4/5) 2', 5', 9', 10'; Knewstubb (1/2) 13'		Try: Alerte 7'c Con: Barraque (1/1) 7'

BC Place, Vancouver
Referee: Francisco González (Uruguay)

9 March 2019
13:24

Australia	17–21	France
Try: Hutchison 2'm Kennewell 8'm O'Donnell 13'c Con: Porch (1/2) 13'; Holland (0/1)		Try: Lakafia 6'c Mignot 7'c Siega 10'c Con: Barraque (3/3) 6', 7', 11'

BC Place, Vancouver
Referee: Richard Kelly (New Zealand)

9 March 2019
13:46

New Zealand	24–26	Spain
Try: Ravouvou (2) 1'm, 10c Knewstubb 3'c Dickson 13'; Con: Knewstubb (2/4) 4', 10'		Try: Rodriguez-Guerra 6'c Hernández 7'c Losada 7'c Pol Pla 14'; Con: Hernández (2/2) 6', 7', 8'

BC Place, Vancouver
Referee: Sam Grove-White (Scotland)

9 March 2019
16:56

Spain	10–26	France
Try: Pla 5'm Martínez 10'm Con: Mateu (0/2)		Try: Bonnefond 7'c Siega (2) 7'c, 11'c Lakafia 13'; Con: Barraque (3/4) 7', 8', 12'

BC Place, Vancouver
Referee: Paulo Duarte (Portugal)

9 March 2019
17:18

New Zealand	36–12	Australia
Try: Ravouvou (2) 1'c, 7'm Dickson 2'm Mikkelson 4'c McGarvey Black 12'c Koroi 12'm Con: Knewstubb (2/4) 2', 4'; McGarvey-Black (1/1) 12'; Koroi (0/1)		Try: Pietsch 10'c Porch 14'm Con: Holland (1/1) 10'; Porch (0/1)

BC Place, Vancouver
Referee: Craig Evans (Wales)

=== Pool D ===
Team	Pld	W	D	L	PF	PA	PD	Pts
England	3	3	0	0	73	28	+45	9
Argentina	3	2	0	1	69	54	+15	7
Scotland	3	1	0	2	50	59	−9	5
Japan	3	0	0	3	21	72	−51	3

9 March 2019
9:08

England	21−7	Scotland
Try: Muir 4'c Mitchell (2/2) 9'c, 14'c Con: Bibby (3/3) 5', 9', 14'		Try: McFarland 7'c Con: Lowe (1/1) 7'

BC Place, Vancouver
Referee: Richard Kelly (New Zealand)

9 March 2019
9:30

Argentina	24−7	Japan
Try: Schulz 1'm Álvarez 6'c Gonzalez 10'm Luna 12'c Con: Mare (2/4) 7', 12'		Try: Koyama 3'c Con: Goya (1/1) 4'

BC Place, Vancouver
Referee: Paulo Duarte (Portugal)

9 March 2019
12:40

England	19−7	Japan
Try: Olowofela (2) 0'c, 4'c Bowen 5'm Con: Bibby (2/3) 1', 5'		Try: Goto 11'c Con: Yoshizawa (1/1) 11'

BC Place, Vancouver
Referee: Francisco González (Uruguay)

9 March 2019
13:02

Argentina	31−14	Scotland
Try: Gonzalez 3'c Mare 5'; Álvarez 8'c Barbier 12'm de la Vega 14'm Con: Mare (3/4) 4', 6', 8'; Bazan Velez (0/1)		Try: Coombes (2) 7'c, 10'c Con: Lowe (2/2) 7', 10'

BC Place, Vancouver
Referee: Jérémy Rozier (France)

9 March 2019
16:12

Scotland	29−7	Japan
Try: Farndale (3) 2'm, 5'm, 11'm Elms 8'c Ross McCann 14'c Con: Lowe (1/3) 9'; McCann (1/1) 14'; Fergusson (0/1)		Try: Soejima 7'c Con: Yoshizawa (1/1) 7'

BC Place, Vancouver
Referee: Damián Schneider (Argentina)

9 March 2019
16:34

Argentina	14−33	England
Try: Gonzalez (2/2) 12'c, 14'c Con: Ulloa (1/1) 12'; Bazan Velez (1/1) 14'		Try: Norton 1'c Muir 7'c Burgess 7'c Bowen 10'm Glover 13'c Con: Bibby (3/3) 2', 7', 8'; Edwards (1/2) 13'

BC Place, Vancouver
Referee: Jordan Way (Australia)

== Knockout stage ==
All times in Pacific Daylight Time (UTC−07:00).

=== Thirteenth Place ===
Semi-finals
10 March 2019 – 12:46 – BC Place, Vancouver
Japan	22
Kenya	14
10 March 2019 – 13:08 – BC Place, Vancouver
Chile	12
Spain	28

Final
10 March 2019 – 16:12 – BC Place, Vancouver
Japan	10
Spain	15

Matches

Semifinals

10 March 2019
12:46

Japan	22–14	Kenya
Try: Motomura (2) 3'c, 6'm Soejima 8'm Ozawa 12'm Con: Nakazawa (1/4) 3'		Try: Mwale 2'c Singah 14'c Con: Olindi (1/1) 3'; Agevi (1/1) 14'c

BC Place, Vancouver
Referee: Francisco González (Uruguay)

10 March 2019
13:08

Chile	12–28	Spain
Try: Byers 7'; Verschae 14'c Con: Fernández (1/1) 14'		Try: Mateu 6'c Rodriguez-Guerra (2) 8'c, 12'c Pla 11'c Con: Mateu (3/3) 7', 9', 11', 12'

BC Place, Vancouver
Referee: Jérémy Rozier (France)

Final

10 March 2019
16:12

Japan	10–15	Spain
Try: Noguchi 2'm Motomura 8'm Con: Hayashi (0/1); Fujita (0/1)		Try: Rodriguez-Guerra 0'm Sainz-Trapaga 5'm Mateu 7'm Con: Mateu (0/3)

BC Place, Vancouver
Referee: Francisco González (Uruguay)

=== Challenge Trophy ===
Quarter-finals
10 March 2019 – 9:30 – BC Place, Vancouver
Wales	35
Japan	0
10 March 2019 – 9:52 – BC Place, Vancouver
Australia	47
Kenya	7
10 March 2019 – 10:14 – BC Place, Vancouver
Scotland	25
Chile	5
10 March 2019 – 10:36 – BC Place, Vancouver
Canada	33
Spain	7

Semi-finals
10 March 2019 – 13:30 – BC Place, Vancouver
Wales	22
Australia	33
10 March 2019 – 13:52 – BC Place, Vancouver
Scotland	14
Canada	19

Final
10 March 2019 – 16:37 – BC Place, Vancouver
Australia	35
Canada	21

Matches

Quarterfinals

10 March 2019
9:30

Wales	35–0	Japan
Try: Jenkins (2) 2'c, 7'c Roach 7'c Cambriani 9'c Treharne 14'c Con: Davies (4/4) 2', 7', 8', 10'; Treharne (1/1) 14'

BC Place, Vancouver
Referee: Damián Schneider (Argentina)

10 March 2019
9:52

Australia	47–7	Kenya
Try: Kennewell (2) 1'm, 9'm Wells 2'm Skelton (3) 4'm, 10'm, 14'm Pietsch (3) 7'm, 7'c, 12'm Con: Porch (1/3) 7'; McNamara (0/6)		Try: Taabu 6'c Con: Wanjala (1/1) 6'

BC Place, Vancouver
Referee: Francisco González (Uruguay)

10 March 2019
10:14

Scotland	25–5	Chile
Try: Farndale (3) 1'm, 2'm, 12'm Fergusson 7'm Elms 10'm Con: Lowe (0/3); Fergusson (0/1); Elms (0/1)		Try: Fernández 3'm Con: Fernández (0/1)

BC Place, Vancouver
Referee: Paulo Duarte (Portugal)

10 March 2019
10:36

Canada	33–7	Spain
Try: Braid (2) 0'c, 3'c Mullins (2) 2'c, 12'm Berna 9'c Con: Braid (4/4) 0', 3', 4', 9'; Kay (0/1)		Try: Alonso 6'c Con: Mateu (1/1) 6'

BC Place, Vancouver
Referee: Jérémy Rozier (France)

Semifinals

10 March 2019
13:30

Wales	22–33	Australia
Try: Cambriani 1'm Davies 6'c Devine 7'm Jenkins 14'; Con: Davies (1/3) 6'; Treharne (0/1)		Try: Kennewell (2) 2'c, 4'; Malouf 9'c Pietsch 10'c Skelton 13'c Con: McNamara (2/3) 3', 9'; Porch (2/2) 10', 13'

BC Place, Vancouver
Referee: Jérémy Rozier (France)

10 March 2019
13:52

Scotland	14–19	Canada
Try: Godsmark 2'c Bryce 3'c Con: Lowe (2/2) 2', 4'		Try: Jones (2) 8'c, 12'c Kaay 14'm Con: Braid (2/3) 8', 12'

BC Place, Vancouver
Referee: Damián Schneider (Argentina)

Final

10 March 2019
16:37

Australia	35–21	Canada
Try: Kennewell 1'c Pietsch (2) 4'c, 12'c Hutchison 7'c Porch 9'c Con: McNamara (3/3) 2', 5', 7'; Porch (2/2) 9', 12'		Try: McCloskey 6'c Kaay 11'c Jones 14'c Con: Braid (3/3) 6', 11', 14'

BC Place, Vancouver
Referee: Jérémy Rozier (France)

=== 5th Place ===
Semi-finals
10 March 2019 – 14:24 – BC Place, Vancouver
Argentina	21
New Zealand	26
10 March 2019 – 14:46 – BC Place, Vancouver
England	33
Samoa	14

Final
10 March 2019 – 17:07 – BC Place, Vancouver
New Zealand	26
England	19

Matches

Semifinals

3 February 2019
14:24

Argentina	21–26	New Zealand
Try: Bazan Velez (2) 0'c, 1'c Ulloa 7'c Con: Mare (3/3) 0', 2', 8'		Try: Molia 6'c Gregory 10'm Nareki 12'c Stephens 14'c Con: Koroi (1/2) 6'; Knewstubb (2/2) 12', 14'

BC Place, Vancouver
Referee: Sam Grove-White (Scotland)

3 February 2019
14:46

England	33–14	Samoa
Try: Norton 1'c Burgess 4'c de Carpentier 7'm Kerr 9'c Penalty Try 12'; Con: Bibby (3/4) 2', 5', 10'		Try: Solia 3'c Alofipo 7'c Con: Tusitala (1/1) 3'; Mealoi (1/1) 7'

BC Place, Vancouver
Referee: Paulo Duarte (Portugal)

Final

3 February 2019
17:07

New Zealand	26–19	England
Try: Nareki (2) 2'c, 10'c Koroi 7'm McGarvey-Black 12'c Con: Knewstubb (1/2) 3'; Koroi (1/1) 10'; McGarvey-Black (1/1) 13'		Try: Norton 4'c Bowen 8'm Olowofela 14'; Con: Bibby (2/3) 4', 14'

BC Place, Vancouver
Referee: Paulo Duarte (Portugal)

=== Cup ===
Quarter-finals
10 March 2019 – 11:08 – BC Place, Vancouver
South Africa	33
Argentina	12
10 March 2019 – 11:30 – BC Place, Vancouver
New Zealand	21
Fiji	22
10 March 2019 – 11:52 – BC Place, Vancouver
England	19
United States	21
10 March 2019 – 12:14 – BC Place, Vancouver
Samoa	12
France	35

Semi-finals
10 March 2019 – 15:08 – BC Place, Vancouver
South Africa	31
Fiji	12
10 March 2019 – 15:30 – BC Place, Vancouver
United States	5
France	33

Final
10 March 2019 – 18:19 – BC Place, Vancouver
South Africa	21
France	12
Third place
10 March 2019 – 17:52 – BC Place, Vancouver
Fiji	24
United States	14

Matches

Quarterfinals

10 March 2019
11:08

South Africa	33–12	Argentina
Try: Geduld 1'c Soyizwapi (2) 6'c, 7'm du Plessis 8'c Gans 11'c Con: S. Davids (3/4) 2', 7', 8'; Du Preez (1/1) 11'		Try: Luna 0'c Ulloa 13'm Con: Mare (1/2) 0'

BC Place, Vancouver
Referee: Richard Kelly (New Zealand)

10 March 2019
11:30

New Zealand	21–22	Fiji
Try: Dickson 2'c Mikkelson 6'c Koroi 11'c Con: Knewstubb (3/3) 2', 7', 12'		Try: Vakurunabili 3'm Tuimaba (2) 4'c, 10'm Naduva 13'm Con: Botitu (1/4) 4'

BC Place, Vancouver
Referee: Jordan Way (Australia)

10 March 2019
11:52

England	19–21	United States
Try: Muir (2) 1'c, 3'm Bowen 7'c Con: Bibby (2/3) 2', 7'		Try: Hughes 8'c Pinkelman 11'c Tomasin 14'c Con: Hughes (3/3) 8', 12', 14'

BC Place, Vancouver
Referee: Craig Evans (Wales)

10 March 2019
12:14

Samoa	12–35	France
Try: Vaili 3'c Solia 11'm Con: Mealoi (1/1) 3'; Paulo (0/1)		Try: Villière (2) 1'c, 7'c Barraque 7'c Zeghdar 13'c Parez 14'c Con: Barraque (5/5) 1', 7', 7', 13', 14'

BC Place, Vancouver
Referee: Sam Grove-White (Scotland)

Semifinals

10 March 2019
15:08

South Africa	31–12	Fiji
Try: Gans 5'c S. Davids 6'c Geduld 9'm du Plessis (2) 11'c, 13'm Con: S. Davids (3/4) 6', 7', 12'; Du Preez (0/1)		Try: Tuimaba 3'm Tuwai 14'c Con: Veilawa (1/1) 14'; Botitu (0/1)

BC Place, Vancouver
Referee: Richard Kelly (New Zealand)

10 March 2019
15:30

United States	5–33	France
Try: Tupuola 14'm Con: Niua (0/1)		Try: Parez 1'c Villière 2'm O'Connor 4'c Barraque (2) 7'c, 10'c Con: Barraque (4/5) 1', 5', 8', 10'

BC Place, Vancouver
Referee: Jordan Way (Australia)

Third Place

10 March 2019
17:52

Fiji	24–14	United States
Try: Naduva 1'm Veilawa 5'c Mocenacagi 8'm Botitu 12'c Con: Veilawa (1/2) 5'; Botitu (1/2) 13'		Try: Williams 3'c Isles 10'c Con: Tomasin (1/1) 3'; Hughes (1/1) 11'

BC Place, Vancouver
Referee: Damián Schneider (Argentina)

Final

10 March 2019
18:19

South Africa	21–12	France
Try: Visser 5'c S. Davids 7'c Kok 8'c Con: S. Davids (3/3) 6', 7', 8'		Try: Lakafia 2'c Parez 9'; Con: Barraque (1/2) 9'

BC Place, Vancouver
Referee: Craig Evans (Wales)

== Tournament placings ==
Place	Team	Points
1st place, gold medalist(s)	South Africa	22
2nd place, silver medalist(s)	France	19
3rd place, bronze medalist(s)	Fiji	17
4	United States	15
5	New Zealand	13
6	England	12
7	Argentina	10
7	Samoa	10

Place	Team	Points
9	Australia	8
10	Canada	7
11	Scotland	5
11	Wales	5
13	Spain	3
14	Japan	2
15	Chile	1
15	Kenya	1

Source: World Rugby

== Players ==
=== Scoring leaders ===
Tries scored
Rank	Player	Tries
1	Simon Kennewell	8
2	Dylan Pietsch	7
3	Carlin Isles	6
3	Connor Braid	6
3	Jamie Farndale	6

Points scored
Rank	Player	Points
1	Selvyn Davids	59
2	Connor Braid	54
3	Jean-Pascal Barraque	49
4	Simon Kennewell	40
5	Terio Veilawa	38

Source: World Rugby

=== Dream Team ===
The following seven players were selected to the tournament Dream Team at the conclusion of the tournament:

Forwards	Backs
(South Africa) JC Pretorius (United States) Stephen Tomasin (Samoa) Tofatu Solia	(South Africa) Selvyn Davids (France) Stephen Parez (France) Jean-Pascal Barraque (Canada) Connor Braid

World Sevens Series XX
Preceded by 2019 USA Sevens	2019 Canada Sevens	Succeeded by 2019 Hong Kong Sevens
Canada Sevens
Preceded by 2018 Canada Sevens	2019 Canada Sevens	Succeeded by 2020 Canada Sevens
