= James Murphy (rugby union) =

- Full name: James Murphy
- Born: 30 November 1995 (age 30)
- Height: 1.89 m (6 ft 2 1/2 in)
- Weight: 98 kg (15 st 6 lb; 216 lb)
- School: Bishops Diocesan College
- University: Stellenbosch University

Rugby union career
- Position: Forward
International career
Years	Team	Apps	(Points)
2018–present	South Africa Sevens	11	(0)
- Correct as of 4 July 2018

Medal record

Men's rugby sevens

Representing South Africa

Commonwealth Games
Gold medal – first place	2022 Birmingham	Team competition

James Murphy (born 30 November 1995) is a South African rugby sevens player for the South Africa national rugby sevens team.

Murphy made his debut at the 2018 Hong Kong Sevens, where South Africa placed third. He was a part of the winning squad in the 2019 Singapore Sevens. He also formed part of the 2017/18 team that won the HSBC 7s World Series.

Murphy was selected to represent South Africa at the 2022 Rugby World Cup Sevens in Cape Town.
