= Ryan Olowofela =

English rugby union player

Taiye "Ryan" Olowofela
- Born: Taiye Ryan Olowofela; 17 April 1998 (age 28) Hull, England
- School: Lincoln Minster School
- Notable relative: Kehinde Olowofela

Rugby union career
- Position(s): Centre, wing
Youth career
- 2014-17: Leicester Tigers
Amateur team(s)
Years	Team	Apps	(Points)
2016	Leicester Lions	2	(0)
2017	South Leicester	3?	(25?)
Senior career
Years	Team	Apps	(Points)
2019–2021	Northampton Saints		
2022–2023	Jersey Reds		
2023–	Nottingham RFC		
- Correct as of 15 March 2023
National sevens team
Years	Team		Comps
2017-	England Sevens		4

Taiye "Ryan" Olowofela (born 17 April 1998) is an English rugby union player who plays centre or wing for Nottingham. Most recently, Ryan has been a part of the England national rugby sevens team. Between 2019 and 2021 he played for Northampton Saints in Premiership Rugby.

== Career ==
=== Leicester Tigers ===
Ryan Olowofela was named as part of the Leicester Tigers team for the 2015 Premiership Rugby Sevens Series. Ryan wasn't announced in the Leicester Tigers squad for the 2017-18 season.

=== Rugby sevens ===
Ryan Olowofela was named as part of the England Rugby Sevens squad for the 2017 Rugby Europe Grand Prix Series. Ryan went on to participate in all four rounds of the series.

=== Northampton Saints ===
Northampton Saints announced the signing of Olowofela on 29 March 2019, with Olowofela to join that summer.
