= Ryan Oosthuizen =

South African rugby union player

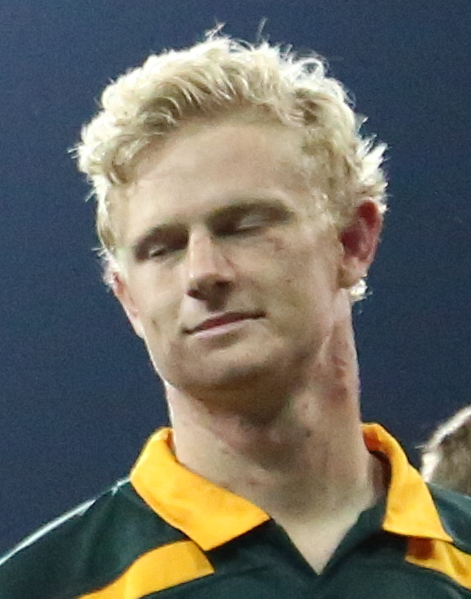
- Oosthuizen at Oktoberfest 2017
- Born: 22 May 1995 (age 31) Stellenbosch, South Africa
- Height: 1.90 m (6 ft 3 in)
- Weight: 95 kg (209 lb)
- School: Paarl Gimnasium
- University: University of Stellenbosch University of South Africa

Rugby union career
- Position: Centre
Youth career
- 2014–2016: Western Province
Senior career
Years	Team	Apps	(Points)
2016–2017	Western Province	3	(0)
- Correct as of 20 April 2018
International career
Years	Team	Apps	(Points)
2017–present	South Africa Sevens	152	(160)
- Correct as of 4 July 2018
Medal record
Men's rugby sevens
Representing South Africa
Olympic Games
Bronze medal – third place	2024 Paris	Team competition
Africa Men's Sevens
Silver medal – second place	2024 Mauritius	Team competition

Ryan Oosthuizen (born 22 May 1995) is a South African rugby union player, currently playing with the South Africa Sevens team in the World Rugby Sevens Series. His regular position is forward in 7s and centre in 15 man rugby.

He made his debut for the South Africa Sevens team at the 2017 Hong Kong Sevens and was also a member of the South Africa Sevens team that won the 2016–17 World Rugby Sevens Series. He is also a bronze medal winner at the 2018 World Cup 7s in San Francisco.

He competed for South Africa at the 2024 Summer Olympics in Paris. They defeated Australia to win the bronze medal final.
