= Mfundo Ndhlovu =

South African rugby union player

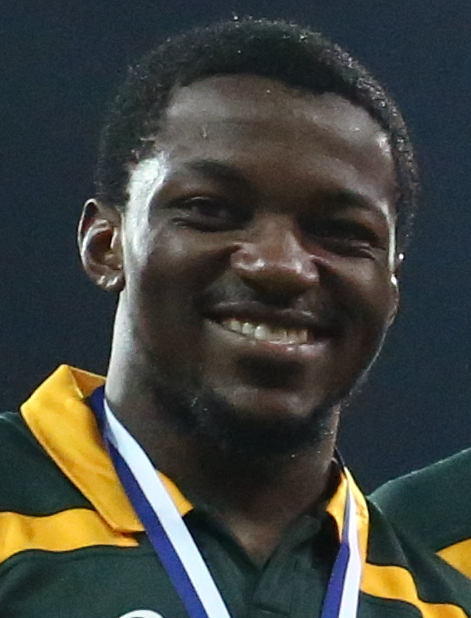
- Full name: Mfundo Kevin Ndhlovu
- Born: 5 April 1997 (age 29) Standerton, Mpumalanga, South Africa
- Height: 1.80 m (5 ft 11 in)
- Weight: 86 kg (190 lb; 13 st 8 lb)
- School: Standerton Hoërskool

Rugby union career
- Position: Wing
- Current team: Stormers / Stormers XXIII
Youth career
- 2013–2015: Pumas
- 2016–2018: Sharks
Senior career
Years	Team	Apps	(Points)
2025–	Stormers	1	
2026–	Stormers XXIII	6	
National sevens team
Years	Team		Comps
2018–2025	South Africa		23
Medal record
Boy's rugby sevens
Representing South Africa
Commonwealth Youth Games
Gold medal – first place	2015 Apia	Team competition
Men's rugby sevens
Commonwealth Games
Gold medal – first place	2022 Birmingham	Team competition

Mfundo Kevin Ndhlovu (born 5 April 1997) is a South African professional rugby union player who plays for the Stormers in the United Rugby Championship and Stormers XXIII in the Currie Cup. His regular position is wing.

== Career ==
Ndhlovu made his debut for the South Africa national sevens team at the 2018 Hong Kong Sevens, and also appeared in the 2018 Paris Sevens, where he was a member of a squad that not only won the tournament, but also won the 2017–18 World Rugby Sevens Series title.

In 2022, he was part of the South African team that won their second Commonwealth Games gold medal in Birmingham.
