= Simon Kennewell =

Australian rugby union player

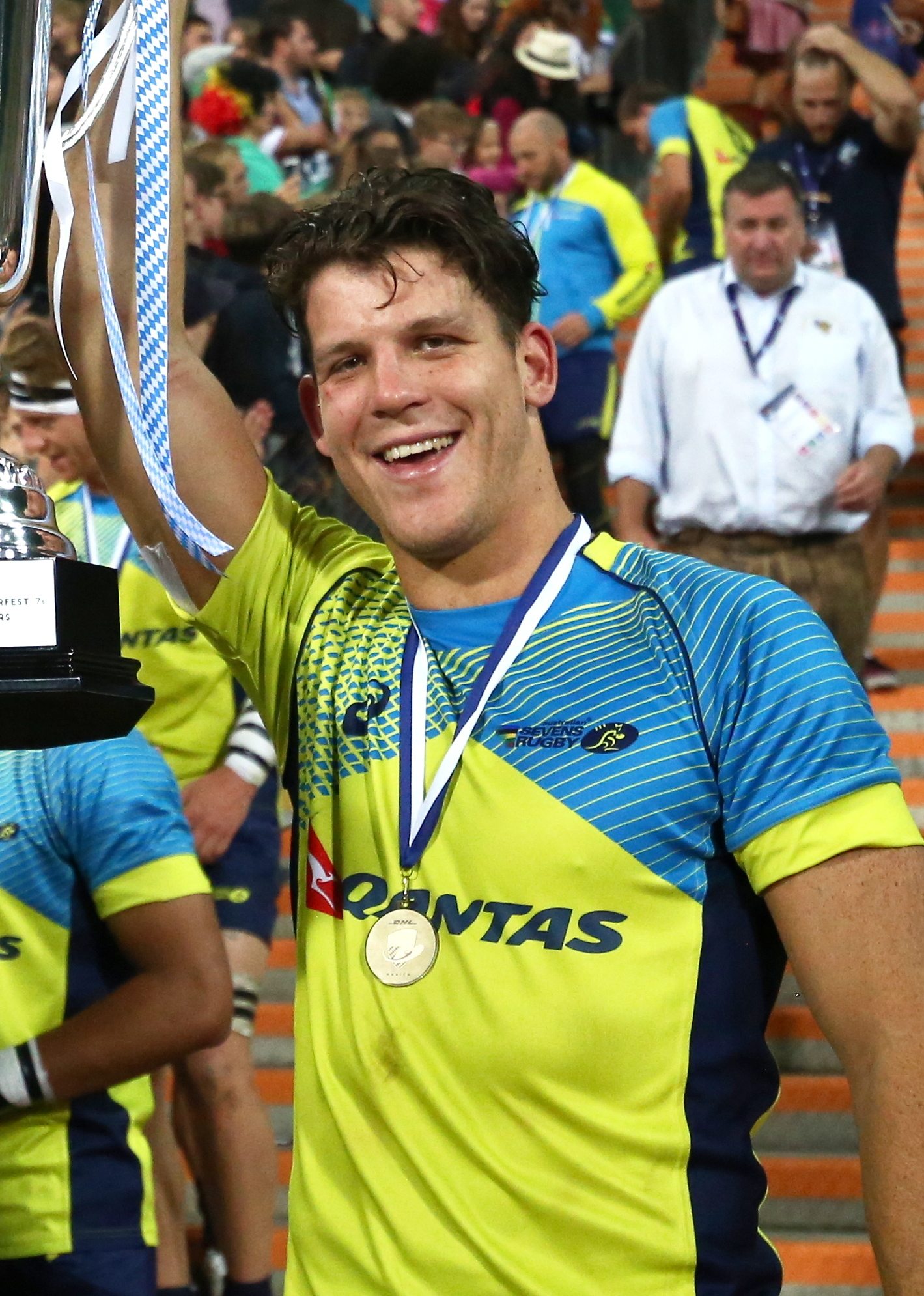
- Kennewell with Australia 7s in 2017
- Born: 2 January 1997 (age 29) Collaroy, New South Wales, Australia
- Height: 1.89 m (6 ft 2 1/2 in)
- Weight: 98 kg (216 lb; 15 st 6 lb)
- Notable relative: Demi Hayes (wife)

Rugby union career
- Position: Centre
Amateur team(s)
Years	Team	Apps	(Points)
2013–2015	Newington College		
Senior career
Years	Team	Apps	(Points)
–	Randwick	12	(15)
National sevens team
Years	Team		Comps
2016–	Australia 7s		23
Medal record
Boy's rugby sevens
Representing Australia
Commonwealth Youth Games
Silver medal – second place	2015 Apia	Team competition

Simon Kennewell (born 2 January 1997) is a professional rugby union player. He represents Australia in rugby sevens. Born in Collaroy, New South Wales, Kennewell joined the Australian Sevens program in September 2015 after impressing at the national Sevens championships in March and then at the 2015 Commonwealth Youth Games in Samoa. A series of powerful performances at the high-class event in Apia in September 2015 persuaded the national Sevens program to offer him a permanent contract while still at school.

Kennewell has gone on to earn a further 23 World Series caps, accumulating 43 tries and selection in two HSBC Dream Team. Kennewell has been a main figure in the nation's sevens setup since cementing his spot in the team. In the sevens format of the game, Kennewell plays as a centre or forward.

Whilst in the sevens program, Kennewell was also selected in the Australian U-20s team to compete at the U-20s World Cup in both 2016 and 2017 where he featured predominantly as a centre or wing.

Born and bred in Sydney, Australia, Kennewell also has English heritage and eligibility. Representative Honours include Newington College 1st XV (2013–15), Australian Schoolboys 2014 and 2015, Australian U20s 2016 and 2017, and Australian Mens 7s team from 2016–present.
