= Naoki Motomura =

Japanese rugby sevens player (born 1992)

Motomura Naoki
- Born: 11 April 1992 (age 34) Hachinohe, Japan
- Height: 184 cm (6 ft 0 in)
- Weight: 88 kg (194 lb; 13 st 12 lb)
- University: University of Tsukuba

Rugby union career
- Position: Wing / Fullback
Senior career
Years	Team	Apps	(Points)
2016–2025	Honda Heat	40	(75)
National sevens team
Years	Team		Comps
	Japan 7s		26
- Correct as of 3 July 2021

Naoki Motomura (本村直樹, born 11 April 1992) is a Japanese rugby sevens player. He competed in the men's tournament at the 2020 Summer Olympics. He was named as a traveling reserve for Japan to the 2024 Summer Olympics in Paris.
