= Liam McNamara =

Australian rugby union player (born 1997)

- Born: 9 February 1997 (age 29) Australia
- Height: 185 cm (6 ft 1 in)
- Weight: 84 kg (185 lb; 13 st 3 lb)

Rugby union career
Amateur team(s)
Years	Team	Apps	(Points)
- Sunnybank Rugby
Senior career
Years	Team	Apps	(Points)
2016–2017	Queensland Country	6	(5)
2018–2019	Reds	0	(0)
2019–2020	Brisbane City	17	(35)
2020–2022	Ayr	18	(14)
2023–2024	Connacht	2	(0)
2023–	Cork Constitution	4	(5)
International career
Years	Team	Apps	(Points)
2016	Australia U20	10	(5)
National sevens teams
Years	Team		Comps
2016–2019	Australia Sevens		69
2023–	Ireland Sevens		2
Medal record
Boy's rugby sevens
Representing Australia
Commonwealth Youth Games
Silver medal – second place	2015 Apia	Team competition
Men's rugby sevens
Representing Ireland
European Games
Gold medal – first place	2023 Kraków–Małopolska	Team competition

Liam McNamara (born 9 February 1997) is an international rugby union player. His playing position is wing or full back.

== Rugby union career ==
=== Amateur career ===
McNamara began his career playing for Sunnybank Rugby, and returned to playing there after injury.

=== Professional career ===
He played for Queensland Country in the 2016–17 season. He also played for Brisbane City in the 2019–20 season. He was named in the Queensland Reds squad for week 15 in 2019. After injuring his ACL he undertook rehabilitation and then played for Sunnybank to regain his fitness.

He moved to Scotland in 2021 to play for the Ayrshire Bulls in the Super 6. As a reward for his good form he was selected to play in a Glasgow Warriors – Edinburgh rugby fixture at the end of the 2021–22 season. This was a friendly match, picking the best players from the Super 6, to see if they could make the step up to the Scottish United Rugby Championship sides. As McNamara played for Ayrshire Bulls in the Glasgow's side catchment, he turned out for Glasgow Warriors.

=== International career ===
McNamara played for Australia U20s in 2016. He was capped by the Australia 7s side in 2016 and played with the 7s side through to 2019.

After a three-year break from international rugby, McNamara began playing for the Ireland national rugby sevens team in 2023. He qualifies for Ireland through his father, who was born in Dublin, Ireland.
