= Philip Snyman =

South African rugby union player

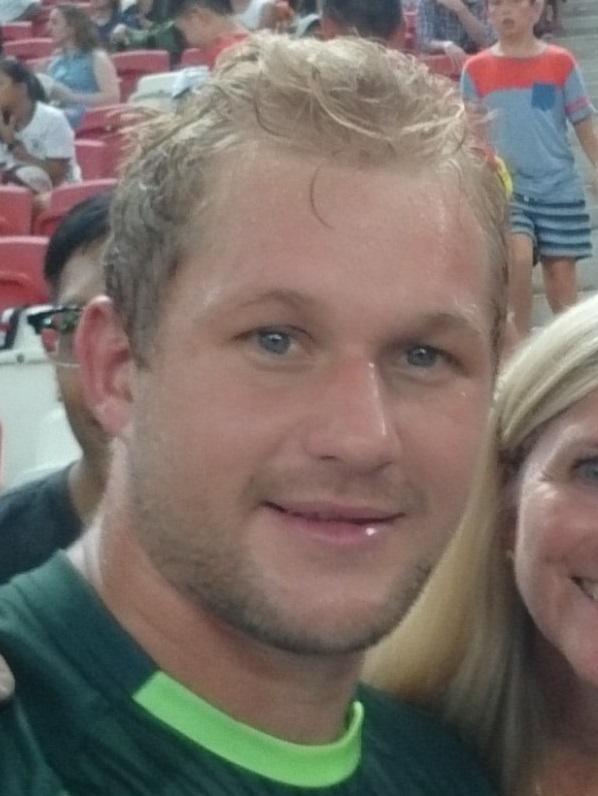
- Full name: Philippus Albertus Bornman Snyman
- Born: 26 March 1987 (age 39) Bloemfontein, South Africa
- Height: 1.88 m (6 ft 2 in)
- Weight: 98 kg (216 lb; 15 st 6 lb)
- School: Grey College, Bloemfontein
- University: University of the Free State

Rugby union career
- Position: Centre / Wing
Senior career
Years	Team	Apps	(Points)
2008–2012	Free State Cheetahs	59	(95)
2008–2009	Griffons	6	(0)
2011–2012	Cheetahs	20	(5)
2011	Emerging Cheetahs	1	(0)
- Correct as of 14 November 2018
International career
Years	Team	Apps	(Points)
2008–2018	South Africa Sevens	248	(346)
- Correct as of 14 November 2018
Coaching career
- Years: Team
- 2022–2023: Germany Sevens (Head Coach)
- 2023–2024: South Africa Sevens (Assistant Coach)
- 2024–: South Africa Sevens (Head Coach)
- Correct as of 5 September 2025
Medal record
As a player
Men's rugby sevens
Representing South Africa
Rugby World Cup Sevens
Bronze medal – third place	2018 San Francisco	Team competition
Olympic Games
Bronze medal – third place	2016 Rio de Janeiro	Team competition
As a coach
Men's rugby sevens
Representing South Africa
Olympic Games
Bronze medal – third place	2024 Paris	Team competition

Philippus Albertus Bornman Snyman (born 26 March 1987) is a South African former rugby union player and is currently the head coach of the South Africa national rugby sevens team. As a player, he was the captain of South Africa's National Rugby 7s Team, Blitzbokke. He also played as a centre or winger for the Cheetahs in both Super Rugby and the Currie Cup.

He was a member of the South African Sevens team that won a bronze medal at the 2016 Summer Olympics.

== Playing career ==
=== Super Rugby ===
Snyman replaced Andries Strauss who was suspended for a dangerous tackle on Lions lock Wikus van Heerden in 2012.

=== Sevens ===
He made his sevens debut for the Blitzbokke at the 2008 Dubai Sevens. He returned for the final two legs of the series in a bid to clinch the 2008–09 IRB Sevens World Series title, which South Africa eventually won.

Snyman signed a two-year contract with the South African Sevens team from 2012 until 2014. In 2013, he was included in the squad for the 2013 Rugby World Cup Sevens. Snyman suffered a knee ligament injury at the 2015 Hong Kong Sevens and was replaced by newcomer Carel du Preez for the rest of the series.

Snyman was included in a 12-man squad for the 2016 Summer Olympics in Rio de Janeiro. He was named in the starting line-up for their first match in Group B of the competition against Spain, scoring a try as South Africa won the match 24–0.

Snyman retired from playing in 2019 after a career ending back injury.

== Coaching ==
Snyman was the head coach of the Germany national rugby sevens team. He guided them during the 2023 World Series Challenger tournament. In 2024 he became the assistant coach of the South Africa national rugby sevens team and had that job from 2023–2024 until becoming the head coach South Africa national rugby sevens team in mid 2024 and he has since had that job.
