= Branco du Preez =

South African rugby union player

- Full name: Branco Bewinn Nazeem du Preez
- Born: 8 May 1990 (age 36) George, South Africa
- Height: 1.66 m (5 ft 5 in)
- Weight: 72 kg (159 lb)
- School: PW Botha College, George
- University: Harmony Academy, Welkom

Rugby union career
- Position: Utility back
- Current team: South Africa Sevens
Youth career
- 2006: SWD Eagles
- 2007–2008: Griffons
- 2009–2010: Blue Bulls
Amateur team(s)
Years	Team	Apps	(Points)
2009	TUT Vikings	3	(0)
Senior career
Years	Team	Apps	(Points)
2017	Golden Lions	2	(0)
- Correct as of 16 December 2022
International career
Years	Team	Apps	(Points)
2010	South Africa Under-20	4	(5)
2010–2022	South Africa Sevens	431	(1447)
- Correct as of 16 December 2022
Medal record
Men's rugby sevens
Representing South Africa
Commonwealth Games
Gold medal – first place	2014 Glasgow	Team competition

Branco Bewinn Nazeem du Preez (born 8 May 1990) is a former South African rugby union player, playing with the South Africa national rugby sevens team. He is a utility back, but usually plays as a scrum-half for the Blitzbokke. Du Preez retired as the most capped South African Rugby Sevens player.

== Career ==
=== Youth ===
Du Preez was born in George, South Africa. He played high school rugby for PW Botha College in George, which earned him a call-up to the South Western Districts side that played at the Under-16 Grant Khomo Week tournament in 2006.

He then joined the Harmony Sports Academy in Welkom, which made him eligible to represent the Griffons. He represented them at the premier high school tournament in South Africa, the Under-18 Craven Week, in both 2007 and 2008. He also represented the Griffons U19 side in the 2007 and 2008 Under-19 Provincial Championships.

When he finished schooling, he moved to Pretoria before the 2009 season. He made three appearances for the TUT Vikings in the 2009 Varsity Cup competition and also represented the Blue Bulls U19 in the 2009 Under-19 Provincial Championship.

He was also selected in the South African Under-20 squad that played at the 2010 IRB Junior World Championship in Argentina. He came on as a substitute in their first match against Tonga in a 40–14 win, started their second match against Scotland at outside centre, helping them to a 73–0 win and once again appeared as a substitute in their final pool match, a 35–42 defeat to Australia. The team qualified for the semi-finals of the competition, but were soundly beaten by New Zealand, losing 7–36 despite Du Preez scoring a try for the Baby Boks just before half-time. He was an unused replacement for their third-place play-off match against England, which South Africa won 27–22.

He returned to domestic action for the Blue Bulls during the 2010 Under-21 Provincial Championship, making four appearances.

=== South African Sevens ===
At the start of 2010, Du Preez became involved with the South African Sevens team. He made his debut for them at the 2010 Wellington Sevens leg of the 2009–10 IRB Sevens World Series. He also appeared at the events in the USA, Australia and Hong Kong before playing in the 2010 IRB Junior World Championship.

Over the next few years, he became a regular on the Sevens World Series circuit. He took part in eight events in both the 2010–11 and 2011–12 seasons.

His 2012–13 was curtailed through injury, playing in just four events, but he did return to play in the 2013 Rugby World Cup Sevens, where the Blitzbokke lost in the Quarter Finals of the competition to Fiji.

He played in eight legs of the 2013–14 IRB Sevens World Series and was then included in the squad that played at the 2014 Commonwealth Games in Glasgow. He helped his side all the way to the final, where they got a 17–12 victory over a New Zealand that won the previous four tournaments.

=== Premier Rugby Sevens ===
In 2023, Du Preez took part in the third season of Premier Rugby Sevens in the United States as a member of the Rhinos x SoCal Loggerheads men's team. He was awarded finals MVP in the Washington, D.C. tournament at Audi Field.
