= Selvyn Davids =

South African rugby union player

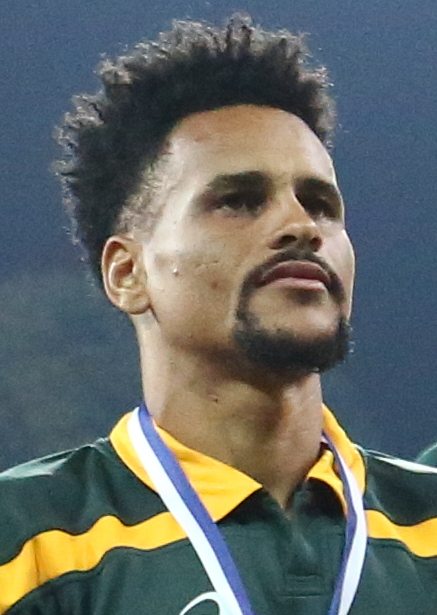
- Davids in 2017
- Born: 26 March 1994 (age 32) Jeffreys Bay, South Africa
- Height: 1.69 m (5 ft 7 in)
- Weight: 70 kg (154 lb)
- School: Nico Malan High School, Humansdorp

Rugby union career
- Position: Centre / Winger
Youth career
- 2007–2014: Eastern Province Kings
2015	Despatch	5	(15)
Senior career
Years	Team	Apps	(Points)
2014	Eastern Province Kings	4	(10)
2015	Free State Cheetahs	0	(0)
2016–2017	Griffons	28	(140)
- Correct as of 3 June 2018
International career
Years	Team	Apps	(Points)
2012	S.A. Schools	0	(0)
2017–present	South Africa Sevens	24	(97)
- Correct as of 1 June 2018
Medal record
Men's rugby sevens
Representing South Africa
Olympic Games
Bronze medal – third place	2024 Paris	Team competition
Commonwealth Games
Gold medal – first place	2022 Birmingham	Team competition
Africa Men's Sevens
Silver medal – second place	2024 Mauritius	Team competition

Selvyn Davids (born 26 March 1994 in Jeffreys Bay) is a South African rugby union player for the South African Sevens team. His regular position is centre or winger.

== Youth ==
Davids played for the Nico Malan High School first team between 2010 and 2013. In the 2013 season, he scored 408 points during the season.

He also represented Eastern Province at all possible youth levels. In 2007, he played for them at the Under-13 Craven Week competition; in 2010, he played at the Under-16 Grant Khomo Week. He also played in the Under-18 Craven Week tournaments in 2011 and 2012, culminating in a call-up to the South African Schools side in 2012, although he didn't make the final squad.

At the end of 2013, he played in four matches for the Eastern Province U19 side in the 2013 Under-19 Provincial Championship season, helping his side to win the Division B title (scoring a hat-trick of tries, five conversions and two penalties in the final) and subsequently win promotion to Division A.

== Club rugby ==
Davids made his senior debut for the Eastern Province Kings in the 2014 Vodacom Cup by coming on as a substitute in their 17–10 opening day defeat to Kenyan side Simba XV. He also appeared as a substitute in their next two matches – a 60–6 victory over the Border Bulldogs in Grahamstown and a 56–22 loss to Western Province in Cape Town – with Davids scoring a try in each of those matches. That led to his first senior start in their next match, a defeat to the Free State XV in Cradock.

== National sevens team ==
Davids was selected to represent the South Africa national rugby sevens team for the 2018 Hong Kong Sevens tournament. A largely inexperienced lineup (including five new caps) was given the opportunity as the bulk of the regular blitzbok squad was in preparation for the 2018 Commonwealth Games in Australia's Gold Coast. Davids was the only South African player included in the Hong Kong Sevens Dream Team at the end of the tournament.

In 2022, He was part of the South African team that won their second Commonwealth Games gold medal in Birmingham.

He captained South Africa at the 2024 Summer Olympics in Paris. They defeated Australia to win the bronze medal final.
