= Matthew Mullins =

Canadian rugby player

Matt Mullins
Personal information
- Full name: Matthew Mullins
- Born: July 28, 1994 (age 32) Belleville, Ontario, Canada
- Height: 188 cm (6 ft 2 in)
- Weight: 104 kg (229 lb)
Medal record
Men's rugby sevens
Representing Canada
Pan American Games
Gold medal – first place	2015 Toronto	Team

Matthew Mullins (born July 28, 1994) is a Canadian rugby union player, in the sevens discipline.

== Career ==
Mullins won gold as part of Canada's team at the 2015 Pan American Games in Toronto.

Mullins was part of Canada's 2018 Commonwealth Games, with the team getting knocked out in the group stage.

In June 2021, Mullins was named to Canada's 2020 Olympic team.
