= Tila Mealoi =

- Born: 28 June 1991 (age 35)

Rugby union career
- Position: Fullback
International career
Years	Team	Apps	(Points)
2013–19	Samoa 7s	229	(779)
2017	Samoa	1	(0)
Medal record
Rugby sevens
Representing Samoa
Pacific Games
Silver medal – second place	2015 Port Moresby	Men's tournament
Silver medal – second place	2019 Apia	Men's tournament

Tila Mealoi (born 28 June 1991) is a Samoan international rugby union player.

== Rugby career ==
Mealoi is a rugby sevens specialist, with over 200 appearances for Samoa in the World Rugby Sevens Series. He has also represented Samoa at the Commonwealth Games and Pacific Games. In 2017, Mealoi won a call up to the Samoa XV for their mid-year internationals and made his debut off the bench against Wales in Apia.

== See also ==
- List of Samoa national rugby union players
