= Impi Visser =

South African rugby player (born 1995)

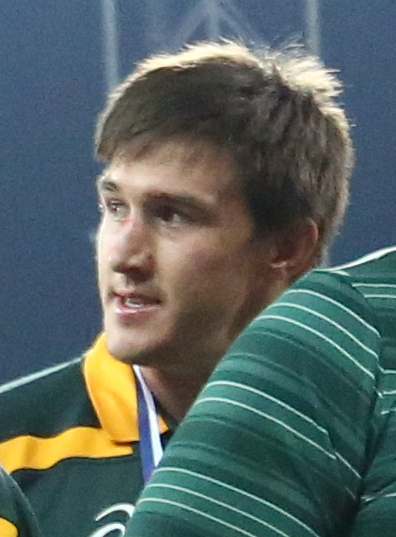
- Full name: Impi Brecher Visser
- Born: 30 May 1995 (age 31) Pongola, South Africa
- Height: 1.87 m (6 ft 2 in)
- Weight: 94 kg (207 lb)
- School: Hoërskool Ermelo
- University: University of Pretoria

Rugby union career
- Position: Centre
Youth career
- 2012–2013: Pumas
- 2014–2016: Blue Bulls
Amateur team(s)
Years	Team	Apps	(Points)
2015–2017	UP Tuks		
- Correct as of 1 December 2018
International career
Years	Team	Apps	(Points)
2018–present	South Africa Sevens	55	(65)
- Correct as of 1 December 2018
Medal record
Men's rugby sevens
Representing South Africa
Olympic Games
Bronze medal – third place	2024 Paris	Team competition
Commonwealth Games
Gold medal – first place	2022 Birmingham	Team competition
Africa Men's Sevens
Silver medal – second place	2024 Mauritius	Team competition

Impi Brecher Visser (born 30 May 1995) is a South African rugby sevens player for the South Africa national team in the World Rugby Sevens Series. In sevens he usually plays as a forward, but is a centre in fifteen-a-side rugby.

== Biography ==
Visser also played rugby union for the Blue Bulls at youth level, initially as a scrum-half before making a move to the centre. He played for the UP Tuks, university side in the Varsity Cup, winning the competition in the 2017 season and also going on representing the Varsity Cup dream team during that same year in an exhibition match against the Junior Springboks.

"Impi", a zulu word, meaning a group of warriors, is not a nickname, but his given name. He has a degree in mechanical engineering.

In 2022, He was part of the South African team that won their second Commonwealth Games gold medal in Birmingham.

He competed for South Africa at the 2024 Summer Olympics in Paris. They defeated Australia to win the bronze medal final.
