= JC Pretorius =

South African rugby union player

- Full name: Johannes Christoffel Pretorius
- Born: 29 January 1998 (age 28) Secunda, Mpumalanga, South Africa
- Height: 1.80 m (5 ft 11 in)
- Weight: 92 kg (203 lb)

Rugby union career
- Position: Flanker
- Current team: Lions / Golden Lions
Youth career
- 2014–2016: Pumas
- 2017–2019: Blue Bulls
Senior career
Years	Team	Apps	(Points)
2023–	Lions	53	(35)
2023–	Golden Lions	14	(30)
- Correct as of 26 October 2026
International career
Years	Team	Apps	(Points)
2016	South Africa Schools	3	(0)
2019–2022	South Africa Sevens	122	(250)
- Correct as of 17 January 2023
Medal record
Boy's rugby sevens
Representing South Africa
Commonwealth Youth Games
Gold medal – first place	2015 Apia	Team competition
Men's rugby sevens
Commonwealth Games
Gold medal – first place	2022 Birmingham	Team competition

Johannes Christoffel Pretorius (born 29 January 1998) is a South African rugby sevens player for the South Africa national team and a rugby union player for the Emirates Lions in the United Rugby Championship and the Currie Cup. His regular position is flanker.

== Biography ==
Pretorius represented the Pumas at the 2015 and 2016 Craven Week tournaments — culminating in a call-up to the South Africa Schools squad for the Under-19 International Series in August 2016 — before moving to Pretoria to join the Blue Bulls. He was named in the Bulls' wider training squad prior to the 2019 Super Rugby season, but was also included in the South Africa national sevens squad prior to the 2018–19 World Rugby Sevens Series.

In January 2019, Pretorius was named the Blitzboks' travelling reserve for the Hamilton Sevens, and a week later, he was included in the main squad for the Sydney event.

In 2022, He was part of the South African team that won their second Commonwealth Games gold medal in Birmingham.
