= Siviwe Soyizwapi =

South African rugby union player

Shakes Soyizwapi
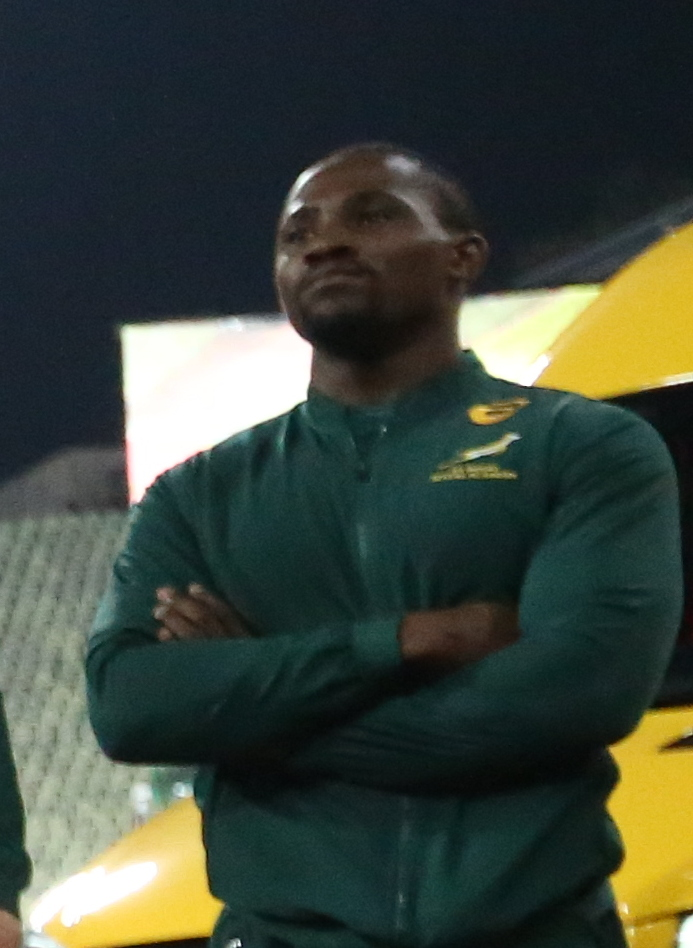
- Soyizwapi at Oktoberfest Sevens 2017
- Full name: Siviwe Sonwabile Soyizwapi
- Born: 7 December 1992 (age 33) Maclear, South Africa
- Height: 1.72 m (5 ft 8 in)
- Weight: 75 kg (165 lb)
- School: Dale College

Rugby union career
- Position: Fullback/ Wing
- Current team: South Africa Sevens
Youth career
- 2010: Border Bulldogs
- 2012–2013: Eastern Province Kings
Senior career
Years	Team	Apps	(Points)
2012–2016	Eastern Province Kings	35	(45)
2013	Southern Kings	6	(0)
- Correct as of 9 October 2016
International career
Years	Team	Apps	(Points)
2016–present	South Africa Sevens	89	(280)
- Correct as of 15 November 2018
Medal record
Men's rugby sevens
Representing South Africa
Olympic Games
Bronze medal – third place	2024 Paris	Team competition
Commonwealth Games
Gold medal – first place	2022 Birmingham	Team competition

Siviwe Sonwabile 'Shakes' Soyizwapi (born 7 December 1992 in Maclear) is a South African rugby union player, who is currently contracted by the South African Rugby Union to play for the South Africa Sevens national team. His usual position is fullback or winger.

== Youth rugby ==
He played for the Border Bulldogs at the Under-18 Academy Week in 2010, earning a call-up to the South African Under-18 High Performance team before joining the Eastern Province Kings Academy. He played for them at the Under-21 Provincial Championship level in 2012 and 2013, finishing the latter competition as the top try scorer.

== Professional career ==
=== Eastern Province Kings ===
He made his first class debut in the 2012 Currie Cup promotion/relegation series against the Free State Cheetahs. Three appearances followed in the 2013 Vodacom Cup (scoring one try), as well as five appearances in the 2013 Currie Cup First Division (where he scored three tries) before reverting to the U21 side for the remainder of the season.

=== Southern Kings ===
He was initially named in the Southern Kings squad for the 2013 Super Rugby season, but was later released to the 2013 Vodacom Cup squad. Having made just four first-team appearances, he was recalled to the Super Rugby squad following an injury to Hadleigh Parkes, and made his Super Rugby debut in the 28–28 draw against the Brumbies in Canberra. He made three starts and three substitute appearances during the 2013 season.

In June 2014, he was selected in the starting line-up for the Eastern Province Kings side to face Wales during a tour match during a 2014 incoming tour. He played the entire match and scored the first try for the Kings in the 57th minute of the match as the Kings suffered a 12–34 defeat.

=== Stormers ===
Shortly before the start of their 2014 Super Rugby season, the Stormers signed Soyizwapi on a loan deal to provide cover for them at wing and full-back, following injuries to Cheslin Kolbe and Jaco Taute. However, he returned to the Kings shortly afterwards.

== Sevens ==
In October 2013, Soyizwapi was called into a South Africa Sevens training squad before the 2013 Dubai Sevens. In November 2015, he joined the South African Sevens team on a two-year contract.

In December 2019, Soyizwapi captained the Blitzboks squad in the World Rugby Sevens Series in Dubai. He led the South African Sevens team to the finals against the All Blacks Sevens, earning his very first gold medal with an emphatic 15-0 win on his birthday on 7 December.

In 2022, He was part of the South African team that won their second Commonwealth Games gold medal in Birmingham.

He competed for South Africa at the 2024 Summer Olympics in Paris. They defeated Australia to win the bronze medal final.
