= John Porch =

Australian rugby union player

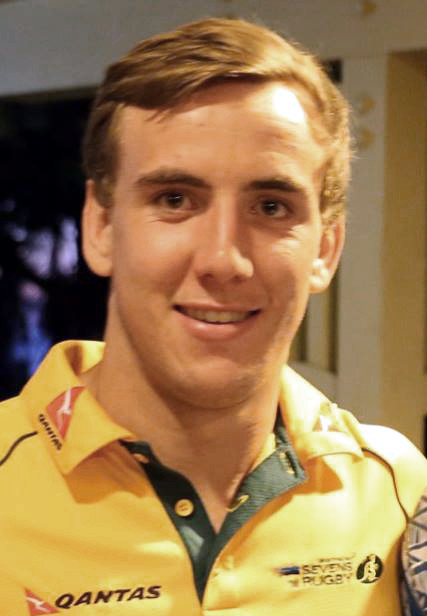
- Porch in Fiji in 2016
- Born: 4 March 1994 (age 32) Orange, New South Wales, Australia
- Height: 1.85 m (6 ft 1 in)
- Weight: 99 kg (218 lb; 15 st 8 lb)
- School: Farrer Memorial Agricultural High School

Rugby union career
International career
Years	Team	Apps	(Points)
2015	Northern Suburbs	13	(10)
2015	Sydney Rays	4	(15)
2019	Northern Suburbs	4	(20)
2019–2025	Connacht	87	(95)
2025-	Vannes	7	(5)
- Correct as of 26 April 2025
National sevens team
Years	Team		Comps
2015–2019	Australia 7s		26
- Correct as of 10 January 2021

John Porch (born 4 March 1994) is an Australian professional rugby union player, currently playing for French Top 14 team Vannes.

Porch joined Irish province Connacht, who compete in the United Rugby Championship and European Rugby Champions Cup, ahead of the 2019–20 northern hemisphere season. Connacht's former head coach who signed Porch is former Australia 7s head coach Andy Friend.

== Australia ==
Porch represented Australia at the 2016 Rio Olympics. He represented Australia at the Gold Coast 2018 Commonwealth Games for the Australian Sevens.
