= List of Riverview Old Ignatians =

"Old Ignatians" are alumni of Saint Ignatius' College, Riverview in Sydney, a Roman Catholic school run by the Jesuits.

== Academia ==
- Professor Athanasius Treweek – Professor of Classics at University of Sydney, cracked Japanese code in World War II

=== Rhodes Scholars ===
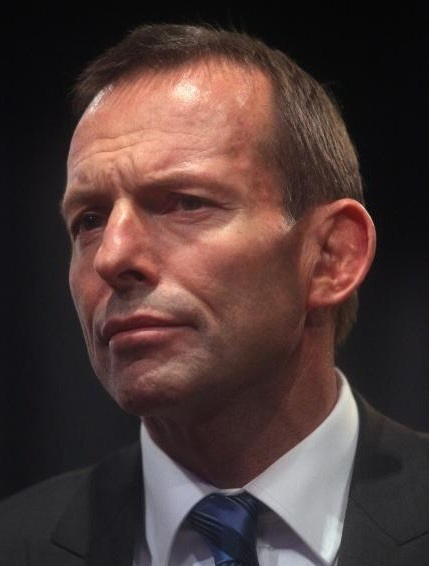
Tony Abbott, Prime Minister of Australia 2013–2015

- Tony Abbott AC, BEc, LLB – Rhodes Scholar 1981, Prime Minister of Australia (2013–2015), Adviser to the UK Board of Trade since 2020.
- Attila Brungs FTSE, FRSN, BSc – Rhodes Scholar 1994, Vice-Chancellor of the University of Technology Sydney 2014–2022, Vice-Chancellor of the University of New South Wales since 2022
- Terence Glasheen, BA – Rhodes Scholar 1938
- Imre Hunyor BSc, MB, BS – Rhodes Scholar 2005
- Michael Izzo BA, LLB – Rhodes Scholar 2000
- Christopher Martin BE – Rhodes Scholar 1990
- Greg O'Mahoney BA, LLB – Rhodes Scholar 2002

== Business ==
- John Kaldor AO (1936– ) – a textiles industrialist and a significant Australian philanthropist renown for his support of the arts
- Paul Ramsay AO (1936–2014) – billionaire, founder of Ramsay Health Care, and a significant Australian philanthropist
- Andrew Todd (1904–1976) – leading New Zealand businessmen; also attended Christian Brothers School, Dunedin; member of one of the richest families in New Zealand
- Sir Bryan Todd (1902–1987) – leading New Zealand businessmen; also attended Christian Brothers School, Dunedin; member of one of the richest families in New Zealand

== Clergy ==
- Rev Fr Edmund Campion OR (1950) – Professor at St Patrick's Seminary, Manly (until the mid-1990s); author and historian
- Fr John Brendan Casey SJ (1909–1985) – priest and educationist; Rector of Riverview (1949–1954)
- Rev Fr Steve Curtin SJ OR (1974) – Provincial of the Australian Province of the Society of Jesus (2008–2013); Director of Jesuit Mission Australia (2001–2008)
- Most Rev Anthony Fisher OP OR (1977) – Archbishop of Sydney since 2014; Bishop of Parramatta Diocese (2010–2014); Auxiliary Bishop of Archdiocese of Sydney (2003–2010)

== Entertainment, media and the creative arts ==
=== Dramatic arts ===
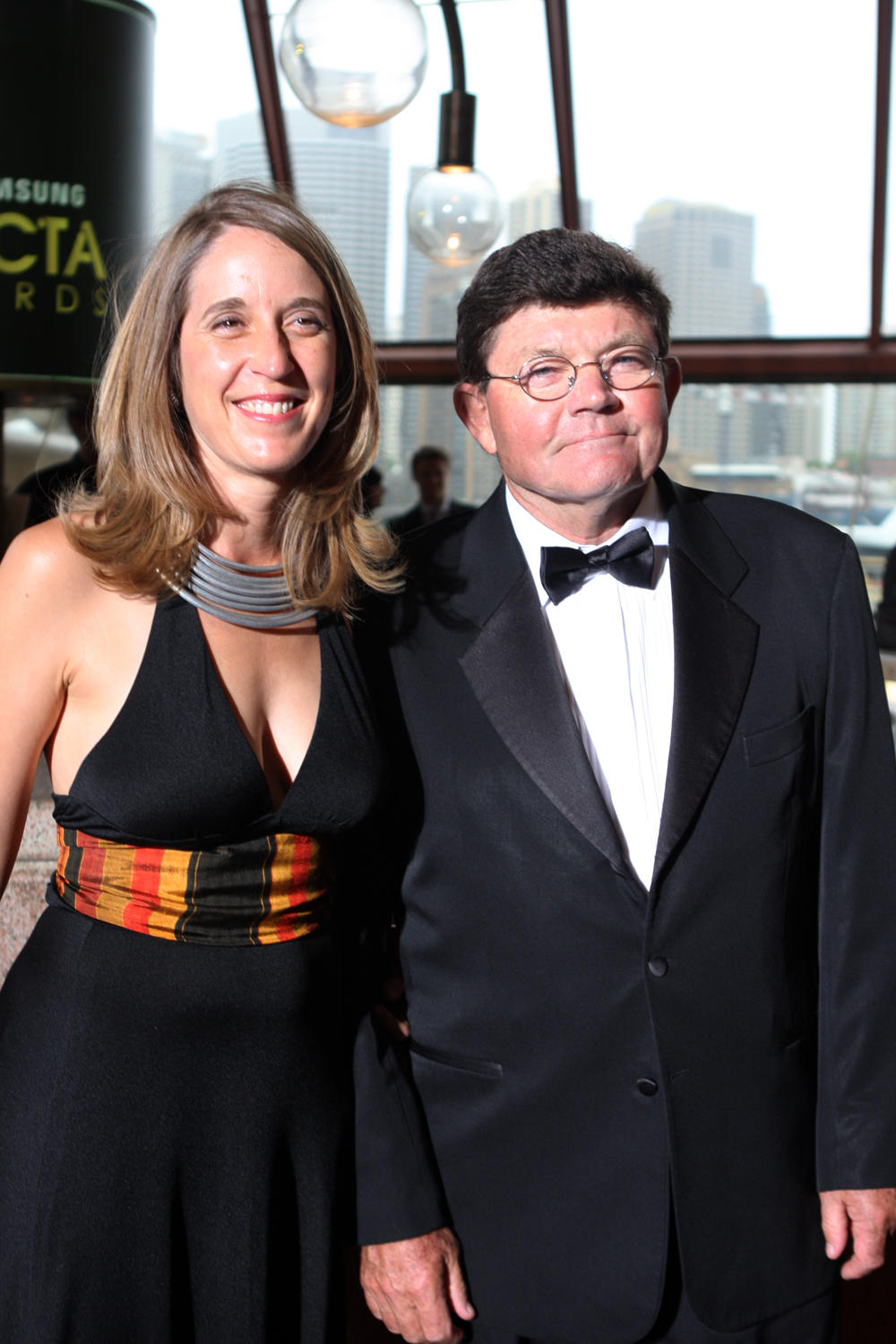
Film maker Bob Connolly

- Bob Connolly – journalist and award-winning documentary film maker and author
- Ben Fordham – Channel Nine and 2GB radio host
- Colin Higgins – writer and film director Harold and Maude, Silver Streak, Nine to Five, Foul Play, etc.
- Marc McDermott – actor on stage and screen
- Gregan McMahon – actor and theatrical producer
- Andrew O'Keefe – former presenter of the Seven Network's Deal or No Deal, Weekend Sunrise and The Chase Australia; former intellectual property lawyer
- Rob Palmer – presenter on Seven Network's Better Homes and Gardens programme
- Bernard Derriman is an Australian animator, director, and producer
- Brendan Jones is an Australian radio presenter, actor, media personality and motorcycling enthusiast.
- Xavier Molyneux is an Australian actor

=== Literary arts ===
- Christopher Brennan – poet (also attended St Aloysius' College)
- Nick Enright – dramatist/playwright
- Justin Fleming – dramatist/playwright
- Robert Hughes – art critic and writer
- Padraic "P. P." McGuinness – conservative journalist; editor of Quadrant Magazine
- Gerard Windsor – writer

=== Music ===
- Rob Dougan – music producer and composer best known for the track "Clubbed to Death", which featured in The Matrix
- James Hunt – percussionist for Rüfüs Du Sol
- Ignatius Jones – actor/musician; creative director of Sydney 2000 Olympic Opening Ceremony and ViViD Festival
- Tyrone Lindqvist – vocalist and guitarist for Rüfüs Du Sol
- Art vs. Science – Electronic dance band consisting of alumni Dan McNamee, Jim Finn and Dan Williams

=== Visual arts ===
- Michael Arthur Macdonald Scott (1910–1990) – former Jesuit priest and educator, co-founder of the Blake prize for religious art and trustee of the National Gallery of Victoria

=== Other ===
- Maurice O'Shea – winemaker

== Law ==
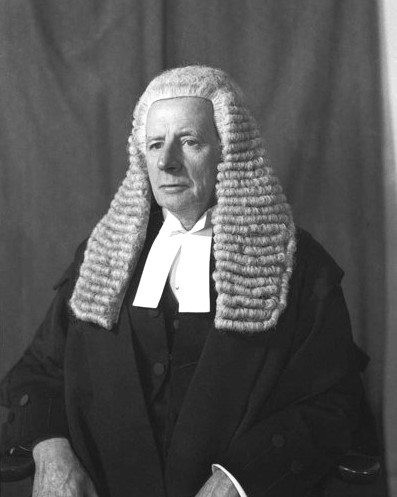
NSW Attorney-General, Sir Henry Manning

- Tom Bathurst AC – Current Chief Justice of New South Wales
- George Ernest Flannery (1872–1945) – barrister who worked with Sir Edmund Barton for Federation and was a foundation member of the Old Ignatians' Union
- Peter Garling – Justice of the NSW Supreme Court, 2010–present
- Clifton Hoeben AM RFD SC – Current Chief Judge in Common Law, NSW Supreme Court (Judge since 2004, Chief Judge since 2012); Major-General of the Australian Army Reserve
- Julian McMahon – human rights lawyer
- Sir Henry Edward Manning (1877–1963) – barrister and politician. Attorney-General of New South Wales.
- Anthony Meagher is a current Justice of the Court of Appeal of the Supreme Court of New South Wales
- Roddy Meagher QC – Justice of the NSW Supreme Court and Court of Appeal, 1989–2004
- George Palmer QC – Justice of the Supreme Court of New South Wales, 2001–2011; musical composer

== Medicine and science ==
=== Medicine ===
- Dr Walter Burfitt CBE – surgeon and co-founder of the Royal Australasian College of Surgeons; Founder of the Medical Benevolent Association of New South Wales (also attended St Aloysius' College)

=== Sciences ===
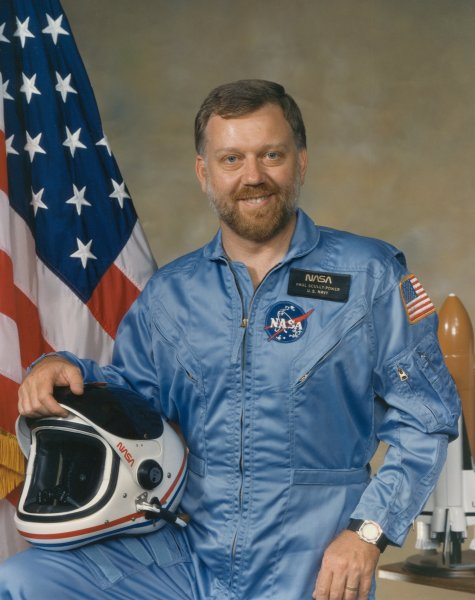
Paul Scully-Power, the first Australian-born astronaut

- Richard Dowden – noted geo- and astrophysicist
- Paul Scully-Power – first Australian born astronaut – Space Shuttle Challenger 1984

== Military ==
- Major Dr. Kevin Fagan – physician and World War II hero
- Clifton Hoeben – Major General and NSW Supreme Court Judge
- Michael Slattery – Rear Admiral and NSW Supreme Court Judge

== Politics and public service ==
=== Politicians ===
- Tony Abbott AC, BEc, LLB – Rhodes Scholar 1981, Prime Minister of Australia (2013–2015), Adviser to the UK Board of Trade since 2020.
- David Connolly (1974–1996) – former Federal Member for Bradfield, representing the Liberals
- Thomas Bartholomew Curran (1870–1929) – former member of Britain's House of Commons
- Jason Falinski MP – Federal Member for Mackellar 2016–2022, representing the Liberals
- Joe Francis MLA – State Member for Jandakot; Lieutenant, Royal Australian Navy
- Dr David Gillespie MP – Federal Member for Lyne, representing the Nationals; and a former gastroenterologist
- Nick Greiner AC – Premier of New South Wales (1988–1992); State Member for Ku-ring-gai (1980–1992), representing the Liberals
- Chris Hartcher MP – State Member for Terrigal and former Member for Gosford, representing the Liberals and now an Independent
- Tom Hughes AC QC – barrister; Federal Member for Parkes (1963–1969), Federal Member for Berowra (1969–1972); Former Attorney-General of Australia (1969–1971)
- Peter Johnson – Federal Member for Brisbane (1975–1980), representing the Liberals
- Barnaby Joyce MP – Federal Member for New England, representing the Nationals; a former Deputy Prime Minister of Australia (2016–2017, 2017–2018)
- Matt Kean MP – State Member for Hornsby, representing the Liberals
- Stephen Lusher – Federal Member for Hume (1974–84), representing the Nationals
- Jonathan O'Dea MP – State Member for Davidson, representing the Liberals
- Anthony Roberts MP – State Member for Lane Cove, representing the Liberals.

=== Public service ===
- Michael Coutts-Trotter – senior New South Wales public servant, currently Secretary of the NSW Department of Communities and Justice since 2019
- Lachlan Harris – Senior Press Secretary to former Prime Minister Kevin Rudd

== Sport ==
=== Horse Polo ===
- Richard Walker – Played for Australia 17 times, 3 of them as Captain during the 1970'sMember of the APF Hall of Fame (2022)

=== AFL ===
- Craig Nettelbeck – Sydney Swans 1990–1994, Fremantle Dockers 1995, Melbourne Football Club 1996–1998
- Andrew Bomford – Essendon Bombers 1997–1998, Sydney Swans 1999–2000
- Leo Barry – Sydney Swans 1995–2009 – AFL Premiership winning player 2005
- Josh Bruce – Greater Western Sydney Giants 2012–2013, St Kilda Football Club 2014–2019, Western Bulldogs 2020–2023
- Malcolm Lynch – Western Bulldogs 2007–2009, North Melbourne Football Club 2012
- Dan Robinson – Sydney Swans
- Will Sierakowski – Hawthorn, North Melbourne

=== Basketball ===
- Jordan Hunter – Sydney Kings 2019–
- Bailey Hanson – Sydney Kings 2026–
- Bol Diing – Miami Dade College 2026–

=== Cricket ===
- Jackson Bird – Australian Test Cricketer 2012–, Tasmanian Tigers 2011–, Melbourne Stars 2012–, Sheffield Shield 'Player of the Year' 2011–2012, Australia A 2012, NSW Blues 2023.
- John Davison – Canadian Cricketer 2001–11.
- Sam Fanning – Western Australia 2022

=== Football ===
- Callum Elder – Leicester City F.C. 2013–2019. Hull City A.F.C 2019–present.
- Adam Biddle – played soccer for Sydney FC In addition to such accolades, is also father to Liam Biddle

=== Rowing ===
- Bryan Curtin – Olympian, Munich 1972 M8+.
- Richard Curtin – Olympian, Munich 1972 M8+.
- Joe Donnelly – Australian representative coxswain (1974–75) M8+ and National Rowing Coach, Vietnam.
- Simon Nola – silver medallist at World Rowing Championships 2013 LM8+.
- Daniel Noonan – dual Olympian, Beijing 2008 M4X and London 2012 M4X bronze medallist.

=== Rugby union ===
==== State/provincial/national ====
- Bryan Hughes – Wallabies 1913, (2 Caps), Christchurch, NZ
- Charles Morrissey – Wallabies 1925–26, (5 Caps) Sydney, NSW.
- Ignatius O'Donnell – Wallabies 1899 (2 Caps), Sydney, NSW
- James Hughes – Wallabies 1907 (2 Caps), Sydney, NSW
- James O'Donnell – Wallabies 1899 (1 Cap), Sydney, NSW
- John "Jack" Manning – Wallabies 1904 (1 Cap), Great Britain
- Jack Dempsey – Wallabies 2017–present, NSW Waratahs 2015–present, Australian Schoolboys 2012, Australian U20 2013–2014
- Mitch Inman – Western Force 2011, Melbourne Rebels 2012, Wallabies training squad 2012
- Jono Jenkins – NSW Waratahs 2012, Western Force 2010, Australian Rugby Sevens 2009
- Jim Lenehan – Wallabies 1958–1967, (24 Caps), Sydney, NSW
- Lachlan McCaffrey – NSW Waratahs 2010, Western Force 2012, ACT Brumbies 2013
- David McDuling – Queensland Reds 2012–2015, Australian Under 20s Rugby World Cup 2009 Natal/Durban Sharks 2015–
- Angus Roberts – Melbourne Rebels 2013
- Michael Wells – ACT Brumbies 2016, NSW Waratahs 2017–2019 and Melbourne Rebels 2020–present, Australian Schoolboys 2010–2011 Australia U20's 2013 Rugby World Cup Australia Sevens 2014–2015 2018–2019 Wallabies squad 2021 French Test Series
- Robert Westfield – Wallabies 1928–29 (6 Caps), Sydney, NSW
- Tom Coolican – USA Eagles 2018–present, as well as being the eldest born son of Dr John Coolican.
- Dr John Coolican AM – Wallabies 1982–83, Sydney University 1975, Waratahs 1977, Former President of NSW RU and current vice-president of Australian Rugby Union. Currently an Orthodontist.

==== International ====
- Jack Dempsey – Scottish rugby union international and Wallaby.

==== Rugby sevens ====
- Henry Hutchison – World Rugby Sevens Series Rookie Player of the Year 2015/16
- Ed Jenkins – Australian Rugby Sevens Captain 2012
- Ed Jenkins – Australian Rugby Sevens Captain 2012

=== Olympians ===
- Frederick Lane – Australia's first Olympic swimmer, Paris 1900, he took gold in the 200 metres freestyle and the 200 metres obstacle race
- Michael Delany – Swimming 1984 Los Angeles 4 x 100-metre Freestyle Relay (Silver Medal) – The 'Mean Machine'
- Daniel Noonan – Australian Olympic rower, men's quad scull in Beijing 2008 (fourth place), also London 2012 (bronze medal).
- Ed Fernon – Modern pentathlon 2012 London Olympics
- Aidan Roach – Water polo 2012 London Olympics, 2016 Rio Olympics
- Will Ryan – Sailing 2016 Rio Olympics 470 Class (Silver Medal) and 2020 Tokyo Olympics 470 Class (Gold Medal)

=== Other ===
- Richard Walsh – professional mixed martial artist and UFC competitor
