= Silicon Valley Sevens =

One-time international Rugby sevens competition

- Host nation: United States
- Date: 4–5 November, 2017

Cup
- Champion: Australia
- Runner-up: United States
- Third: England

Bowl
- Winner: Ireland

Collegiate Classic
- Winner: Central Washington
- Runner-up: Arizona

Tournament details
- Matches played: 34
- Tries scored: 92 (average 2.71 per match)
- Most points: Maurice Longbottom & Edward Jenkins (35)
- Most tries: Maurice Longbottom & Edward Jenkins (7)

The 2017 Silicon Valley Sevens was a one-time international Rugby sevens competition held in San Jose, California, at the Avaya Stadium on November 4 and 5, 2017, produced and hosted by United World Sports. The tournament marked both the first such held on American soil outside of the USA Sevens and the first time the Ireland national rugby sevens team competed in the United States.

Competed alongside the international competition was the eight-team Penn Mutual Collegiate Rugby Fall Classic at Silicon Valley 7s . The first three teams announced were from the nearby universities of Stanford, Santa Clara, and USC. The collegiate competition was a double-elimination format and included schools from three different states (Arizona, California (6), and Washington).

== Format ==
The teams were drawn into three pools of four teams each. Each team plays every other team in their pool once. The top eight teams from pool play advanced to the Cup bracket. The bottom four teams go to the Bowl bracket.

== Teams ==
- Australia
- Canada
- Chile
- China
- England
- Fiji
- Ireland
- Japan
- New Zealand
- Samoa
- Tonga
- United States

== Pool stage ==
All times in Pacific Standard Time (UTC−08:00). The pools were scheduled as follows:

=== Pool A ===
| Team | Pld | W | D | L | PF | PA | PD | Pts |
|---|---|---|---|---|---|---|---|---|
| Samoa | 3 | 2 | 1 | 0 | 41 | 31 | +10 | 8 |
| England | 3 | 1 | 1 | 1 | 45 | 33 | +12 | 6 |
| Canada | 3 | 1 | 0 | 2 | 36 | 46 | −10 | 5 |
| Ireland | 3 | 0 | 1 | 2 | 24 | 36 | −12 | 5 |

4 November 2017
11:44

| England | 10–19 | Canada |
| Try: Olowofela (1); Dewar (1); Con: Team (0/2) | | Try: Moonlight (1); Kaay (1); Matt Mullins (1); Con: Kay (2/3) |

Avaya Stadium, San Jose

4 November 2017
12:06

| Samoa | 10–5 | Ireland |
| Try: Ale (1); Perez (1); Con: Pentito (0/2) | | Try: Mollen (1); Con: Dardis (0/1) |

Avaya Stadium, San Jose

4 November 2017
15:22

| England | 14–14 | Samoa |
| Try: Muir (1); Charlie Kingham (1); Con: Edwards (2/2) | | Try: Perez (1); Kellet/Moore (2); Con: Faapale (2/2) |

Avaya Stadium, San Jose

4 November 2017
15:44

| Canada | 5–19 | Ireland |
| Try: Underwood (1); Con: Underwood (0/1) | | Try: Conroy (2); Roche (1); Con: Dardis (2/3) |

Avaya Stadium, San Jose

4 November 2017
18:54

| England | 26–5 | Ireland |
| Try: Glover (1); Edwards (1); Muir (1); Guiry (1); Con: Edwards (3/3); Team (0/1) | | Try: Kennedy (1); Con: Team (0/1) |

Avaya Stadium, San Jose

4 November 2017
19:16

| Canada | 12–17 | Samoa |
| Try: Underwood (1); Moonlight (1); Con: Kay (1/1); Team (0/1) | | Try: Motuga (1); Toloa (1); Ale (1); Con: Faapale (1/1); Penitito (0/1); Team (0/1) |

Avaya Stadium, San Jose

=== Pool B ===
| Team | Pld | W | D | L | PF | PA | PD | Pts |
|---|---|---|---|---|---|---|---|---|
| Australia | 3 | 3 | 0 | 0 | 112 | 7 | +105 | 9 |
| Japan | 3 | 1 | 1 | 1 | 80 | 62 | +18 | 6 |
| Fiji | 3 | 1 | 1 | 1 | 47 | 65 | –18 | 6 |
| China | 3 | 0 | 0 | 3 | 10 | 115 | −105 | 3 |

4 November 2017
11:00

| Japan | 47–0 | China |
| Try: Hasyashi (1); Noguchi (3); Shinomiya (1); Soejima (2); Con: Shinomiya (6/6); Noguchi (0/1) |

Avaya Stadium, San Jose

4 November 2017
11:22

| Fiji | 0–29 | Australia |
| | | Try: Thomas (1); Porch (1); O'Donnell (2); Lewis Holland; Con: Thomas (0/2); Holland (2/3) |

Avaya Stadium, San Jose

4 November 2017
14:38

| Fiji | 26–26 | Japan |
| Try: Batine (2); Veremalua (1); Vakurinabili (1); Con: Batine (3/4) | | Try: Shinomiya (1); Murata (1); Seru (1); Motomura (1); Con: Shinomiya (3/3); Soejima (0/1) |

Avaya Stadium, San Jose

4 November 2017
15:00

| Australia | 47–0 | China |
| Try: Holland (1); Anstee (1); O'Donnell (1); Longbottom (3); Edward Jenkins (1); Con: Lucas (6/7) |

Avaya Stadium, San Jose

4 November 2017
18:10

| Fiji | 36–15 | China |
| Try: Bololailai (1); Rauto (1); Vakayalia (1); Vucago (1); Tevita (1); Con: Batine (5/5) | | Try: Shan (3); Con: Shan (0/2); Ma (0/1) |

Avaya Stadium, San Jose

4 November 2017
18:32

| Australia | 36–7 | Japan |
| Try: Kennewell (1); Jenkins (2); Anderson (1); Anstee (1); Con: Thomas (2/4); Holland (1/2) | | Try: Noguchi (1); Con: Shinomiya (1/1) |

Avaya Stadium, San Jose

=== Pool C ===
| Team | Pld | W | D | L | PF | PA | PD | Pts |
|---|---|---|---|---|---|---|---|---|
| United States | 3 | 3 | 0 | 0 | 82 | 33 | +49 | 9 |
| Chile | 3 | 2 | 0 | 1 | 60 | 29 | +31 | 7 |
| New Zealand | 3 | 1 | 0 | 2 | 46 | 31 | +15 | 5 |
| Tonga | 3 | 0 | 0 | 3 | 7 | 102 | −95 | 3 |

4 November 2017
12:28

| New Zealand | 0–7 | Chile |
| | | Try: Brangier (1); Con: Marcelo Torrealba (1/1) |

Avaya Stadium, San Jose

4 November 2017
12:50

| United States | 29–7 | Tonga |
| Try: Tomasin (4); Williams (1); Con: Tomasin (0/1); Niua (2/4) | | Try: Soakai (1); Con: Moimoi (1/1) |

Avaya Stadium, San Jose

4 November 2017
16:06

| Chile | 39–0 | Tonga |
| Try: Blanc (1); P. Verschae (1); De Vits (3); Westcott (1); M. Verschae (1); Con: Torrealba (0/3); Brangier (1/1); Fernandez (1/3) |

Avaya Stadium, San Jose

4 November 2017
16:28

| New Zealand | 12–24 | United States |
| Try: Masirewa (2); Con: Laulala (1/2) | | Try: Ben Pinkelman (1); Martin Iosefo (1); Schroeder (1); Stephen Tomasin (1); Con: Niua (2/4) |

Avaya Stadium, San Jose

4 November 2017
19:38

| New Zealand | 34–0 | Tonga |
| Try: Rayasi (2); Tiatia (1); Emerson (2); Hyland (1); Con: Laulala (2/4); Team (0/2) |

Avaya Stadium, San Jose

4 November 2017
20:00

| United States | 29–21 | Chile |
| Try: Williams (1); Matyas (1); Unufe (2); Mattina (1); Con: Niua (1/3); Tomasin (0/1); Matyas (1/1) | | Try: Brangier (2); Garafulic (1); Con: Torrealba (2/2); Urroz (1/1) |

Avaya Stadium, San Jose

Source: Rugby Today Source: SevensRugby.com

== Knockout stage ==
=== Bowl ===
Semi-finals
5 November 2017 – 11:00 – Avaya Stadium, San Jose
Ireland | 38
China | 5
5 November 2017 – 11:22 – Avaya Stadium, San Jose
Canada | 41
Tonga | 0

Bowl Final
5 November 2017 – 14:45 – Avaya Stadium, San Jose
Ireland | 19
Canada | 12
Eleventh place
5 November 2017 – 14:23 – Avaya Stadium, San Jose
China | 34
Tonga | 5

Matches

Bowl Semifinals

5 November 2017
11:00

| Ireland | 38–5 | China |
| Try: O'Donnell (2); Conroy (1); Dardis (1); McNulty (1); Daly (1); Con: Dardis (2/4); Schmidt (2/2) | | Try: Ma (1); Con: Ma (0/1) |

Avaya Stadium, San Jose

5 November 2017
11:22

| Canada | 41–0 | Tonga |
| Try: Cejvanovic (1); Douglas (1); Morra (1); Bradley (1); Kay (2); Kaay (1); Con: Kay (3/7) |

Avaya Stadium, San Jose

Eleventh Place

5 November 2017
14:23

| China | 34–5 | Tonga |
| Try: Fu (2); Hu (2); Shan (1); Ma (1); Con: Shan (0/2); Feng (0/1); Ma (2/3) | | Try: Soakai (1); Con: Taione (0/1) |

Avaya Stadium, San Jose

Final

5 November 2017
14:45

| Ireland | 19–12 | Canada |
| Try: Kennedy (2); Fitzpatrick (1); Con: Dardis (2/3) | | Try: Underwood (2); Con: Kay (1/2) |

Avaya Stadium, San Jose

=== Fifth place ===
Semi-finals
5 November 2017 – 15:10 Avaya Stadium, San Jose
New Zealand | 15
Fiji | 26
5 November 2017 – 15:32 Avaya Stadium, San Jose
Samoa | 27
Japan | 12

Fifth place
5 November 2017 – 18:17 Avaya Stadium, San Jose
Fiji | 14
Samoa | 26
Seventh place
5 November 2017 – 17:55 Avaya Stadium, San Jose
New Zealand | 26
Japan | 5

Matches

Semifinals

5 November 2017
15:10

| New Zealand | 15–26 | Fiji |
| Try: Meltzer (1); Hyland (2); Con: Meltzer (0/1); Harmon (0/2) | | Try: Vakurinabili (1); Nasilasila (1); Veremalua (2); Con: Nasilasila (3/3); Batine (0/1) |

Avaya Stadium, San Jose

5 November 2017
15:32

| Samoa | 27–12 | Japan |
| Try: Penetito (1); Alosio (1); Toloa; Perez (1); Moore (1); Con: Alosio (1/2); Penetito (0/1); Falniko (0/2) | | Try: Seru (1); Tsupou (1); Con: Shinomiya (1/1); Noguchi (0/1) |

Avaya Stadium, San Jose

Seventh Place

5 November 2017
17:55

| New Zealand | 26–5 | Japan |
| Try: Emerson (2); Rayasi (1); Laulala (1); Con: Laulala (3/4) | | Try: Naoki Motomura (1); Con: Michael Shinomiya (0/1) |

Avaya Stadium, San Jose

Final

5 November 2017
18:17

| Fiji | 14–26 | Samoa |
| Try: Bololailai (1); Batine (1); Con: Vakayalia (1/1); Batine (1/1) | | Try: Falaniko (1); Toloa (1); Ale (1); Motuga (1); Con: Penetito (3/4) |

Avaya Stadium, San Jose

=== Cup ===
Quarter-finals
5 November 2017 – 12:04 – Avaya Stadium, San Jose
Australia | 40
New Zealand | 7
5 November 2017 – 13:10 – Avaya Stadium, San Jose
Chile | 24
Japan | 10
5 November 2017 – 12:48 – Avaya Stadium, San Jose
Samoa | 10
England | 25
5 November 2017 – 12:26 – Avaya Stadium, San Jose
United States | 24
Fiji | 5

Semi-finals
5 November 2017 – 15:54 Avaya Stadium, San Jose
Australia | 27
Chile | 0
5 November 2017 – 16:16 Avaya Stadium, San Jose
United States | 27
England | 0

Final
5 November 2017 – 19:04 Avaya Stadium, San Jose
Australia | 15
United States | 12
Third place
5 November 2017 – 18:39 Avaya Stadium, San Jose
Chile | 12
England | 31

Matches

Quarterfinals

5 November 2017
12:04

| Australia | 40–7 | New Zealand |
| Try: Jenkins (2); Anderson (2); Kennewell (1); Porch (1); Con: Lucas (3/4); Holland (2/2) | | Try: Houston (1); Con: Laulala (1/1) |

Avaya Stadium, San Jose

5 November 2017
12:26

| United States | 24–5 | Fiji |
| Try: Williams (1); Iosefo (2); Schroeder (1); Con: Niua (2/4) | | Try: Vakyalia (1); Con: Batine (0/1) |

Avaya Stadium, San Jose

5 November 2017
12:48

| Samoa | 10–25 | England |
| Try: Ale (1); Falaniko (1); Con: Toloa (0/1); Penetito (0/1) | | Try: Olowofela (1); Muir (1); Guiry (2); Glover (1); Con: Edwards (0/5) |

Avaya Stadium, San Jose

5 November 2017
13:10

| Chile | 24–10 | Japan |
| Try: De Vits (2); Torrealba (1); P. Verschae (1); Con: Torrealba (1/2); Urroz (1/1); Fernandez (0/1) | | Try: Motomura (1); Hayashi (1); Con: Shinomiya (0/2) |

Avaya Stadium, San Jose

Semifinals

5 November 2017
15:54

| Australia | 27–0 | Chile |
| Try: Myers (1); Longbottom (3); Killingworth (1); Con: Holland (1/3); Longbottom (0/1); Porch (0/1) |

Avaya Stadium, San Jose

5 November 2017
16:16

| United States | 27–0 | England |
| Try: Pinkelman (2); Iosefo (1); Mattina (1); Williams (1); Con: Niua (0/3); Tomasin (1/2) |

Avaya Stadium, San Jose

Third Place

5 November 2017
18:39

| Chile | 12–31 | England |
| Try: Fernandez (1); Garafulic (1); Con: [[Marcelo Torrealba}Torrealba]] (0/1); Urroz (1/1) | | Try: De Cothi (2); Dewar (1); Edwards (1); Glover (1); Con: Edwards (3/5) |

Avaya Stadium, San Jose

Final

5 November 2017
19:04

| Australia | 15–12 | United States |
| Try: Jenkins (2); Longbottom (1); Con: Holland (0/2); Porch (0/1) | | Try: Pinkelman (1); Tomasin (1); Con: Niua (1/2) |

Avaya Stadium, San Jose

Source: Rugby Today Source: Rugby Today

== Tournament placings ==
| Place | Team |
|---|---|
| 1st place, gold medalist(s) | Australia |
| 2nd place, silver medalist(s) | United States |
| 3rd place, bronze medalist(s) | England |
| 4 | Chile |
| 5 | Samoa |
| 6 | Fiji |

| Place | Team |
|---|---|
| 7 | New Zealand |
| 8 | Japan |
| 9 | Ireland |
| 10 | Canada |
| 11 | China |
| 12 | Tonga |

Source: SevensRugby.com

== Players ==
=== Scoring leaders ===
Tries scored
| Rank | Player | Tries |
|---|---|---|
| 1 | Edward Jenkins | 7 |
| 1 | Maurice Longbottom | 7 |
| 3 | Stephen Tomasin | 6 |
| 4 | Banjamin De Vits | 5 |
| 5 | Lachlan Anderson | 4 |
| 5 | Liam Underwood | 4 |
| 5 | Changshun Shan | 4 |
| 5 | Yoshihiro Noguchi | 4 |
| 5 | Mason Emerson | 4 |
| 5 | Jacobe Ale | 4 |
| 5 | Ben Pinkelman | 4 |
| 5 | Kevon Williams | 4 |
| 5 | Martin Iosefo | 4 |

Points scored
| Rank | Player | Points |
|---|---|---|
| 1 | Edward Jenkins | 35 |
| 1 | Maurice Longbottom | 35 |
| 3 | Nocenieli Batine | 33 |
| 4 | Michael Shinomiya | 32 |
| 4 | Stephen Tomasin | 32 |

Source: SevensRugby.com

=== Dream Team ===
The following seven players were selected to the tournament Dream Team at the conclusion of the tournament:

| (Australia) Maurice Longbottom (Australia) Edwards Jenkins (Chile) Banjamin De Vits | (Japan) Michael Shinomiya (United States) Ben Pinkelman (United States) Folau Niua (United States) Stephen Tomasin |

== Penn Mutual Silicon Valley 7s Fall Collegiate Classic ==
=== Format ===
The tournament was conducted under a double-elimination format. The winners of each first-round contest would continue in the winners' bracket and face the other winners from the first round. The two sides having won both their first and second matches advanced immediately to semifinal #1. The two sides having lost both their first and second matches were eliminated. And the four remaining sides to have posted 1–1 records through the first day of play advanced to compete in one of the two losers' bracket matchups on day 2. The winners of each of those losers' bracket contests competed against each other, with the winner advancing to play the loser of semifinal #1 in semifinal #2. The winner of semifinal #2 advanced to a winner-take-all final against the thus far undefeated winner of semifinal #1.

Source: Rugby Today

=== Teams ===
- Arizona
- Cal Poly Pomona
- Central Washington
- San Diego State
- Santa Clara
- Stanford
- UC Davis
- USC

Source: Rugby Today

=== Competition ===
All times in Pacific Standard Time (UTC−08:00).

==== Round 1 ====
4 November 2017
13:12

| Arizona (1–0) | 35–0 | Stanford (0–1) |

Avaya Stadium, San Jose

4 November 2017
13:32

| Cal Poly Pomona (1–0) | 14-12 | UC Davis (0–1) |

Avaya Stadium, San Jose

4 November 2017
13:54

| USC (0–1) | 7–27 | Central Washington (1–0) |

Avaya Stadium, San Jose

4 November 2017
14:16

| San Diego State (1–0) | 26–0 | Santa Clara (0–1) |

Avaya Stadium, San Jose

==== Losers' Bracket Round 2 ====
4 November 2017
16:50

| UC Davis (1–1) | 24–19 | Stanford (0–2) |

Avaya Stadium, San Jose

4 November 2017
17:10

| USC (1–1) | 29–19 | Santa Clara (0–2) |

Avaya Stadium, San Jose

==== Winners' Bracket Round 2 ====
4 November 2017
17:30

| Arizona (2–0) | 22–10 | Cal Poly Pomona (1–1) |

Avaya Stadium, San Jose

4 November 2017
17:50

| Central Washington (2–0) | 43–0 | San Diego State (1–1) |

Avaya Stadium, San Jose

==== Losers' Bracket Round 3 ====
5 November 2017
10:00

| UC Davis (1–2) | 0–29 | San Diego State (2–1) |

Avaya Stadium, San Jose

5 November 2017
10:20

| USC (1–2) | 7–12 | Cal Poly Pomona (2–1) |

Avaya Stadium, San Jose

==== Winners' Bracket Semifinal ====
5 November 2017
10:40

| Arizona (2–1) | 0–15 | Central Washington (3–0) |

Avaya Stadium, San Jose

==== Losers' Bracket Round 4 ====
5 November 2017
11:44

| San Diego State (3–1) | 27–10 | Cal Poly Pomona (2–2) |

Avaya Stadium, San Jose

==== Losers' Bracket Semifinal ====
5 November 2017
13:32

| Arizona (3–1) | 24–7 | San Diego State (3–2) |

Avaya Stadium, San Jose

==== Final ====
5 November 2017
16:38

| Central Washington (4–0) | 15–14 | Arizona (3–2) |

Avaya Stadium, San Jose

Source: Rugby Today Source: Flo Rugby

=== Tournament placings ===
| Place | Team | Record |
|---|---|---|
| 1st place, gold medalist(s) | Central Washington | 4–0 |
| 2 | Arizona | 3–2 |
| 3 | San Diego State | 3–2 |
| 4 | Cal Poly Pomona | 2–2 |

| Place | Team | Record |
|---|---|---|
| 5 | UC Davis | 1–2 |
| 5 | USC | 1–2 |
| 7 | Santa Clara | 0–2 |
| 7 | Stanford | 0–2 |
