= Joseph Donnelly =

Joseph or Joe Donnelly could refer to:

- Joseph Donnelly (cricketer), Irish cricketer
- Joseph Francis Donnelly (1909–1977), American Roman Catholic bishop
- Joey Donnelly (1909–1992), Irish footballer
- Sir Brian Donnelly (British diplomat) (Joseph Brian Donnelly, born 1945), British diplomat
- Joe Donnelly (rower) (born 1951), Australian rower
- Joe Donnelly (born 1955), American politician
