= John Hughes (New South Wales politician) =

Politician and solicitor in New South Wales, Australia

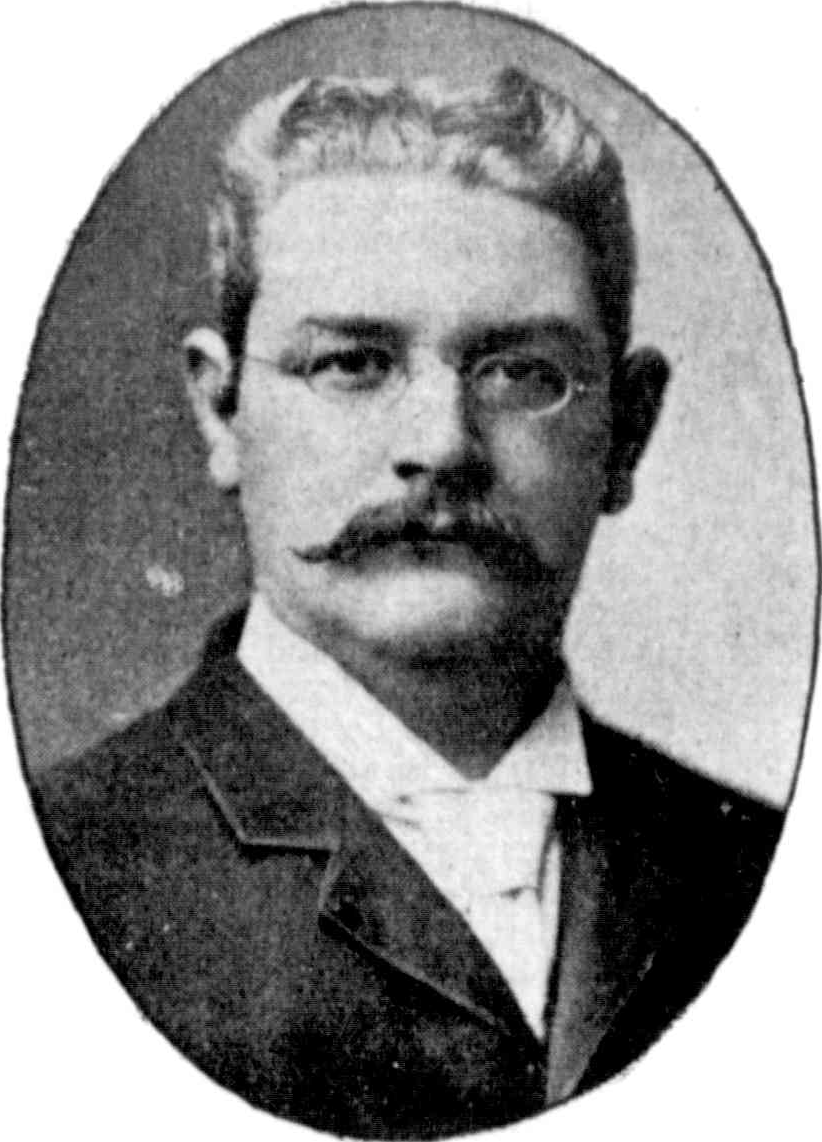

John Francis Hughes KCSG (11 May 1857 – 18 December 1912) was an Australian solicitor and politician.

== Early years and background ==
He was born in Sydney to merchant John Hughes and Susan Sharkey. He was the elder brother of Sir Thomas Hughes. From 1870 he was educated at Stonyhurst College in Lancashire, and in 1876 he graduated from the University of London. He returned to Sydney and worked as a solicitor's clerk before his admission as a practising solicitor in 1884. On 2 July 1884 he married Mary Rose Gillhooley, with whom he had nine children. From 1887 he partnered with his brother, and he was also a landowner.

== Political career ==
From 1891 to 1894 he was a Sydney City alderman for Fitzroy Ward.

In 1895 he was appointed to the New South Wales Legislative Council. He was a member of the Reid ministry, serving as Vice-President of the Executive Council and Representative of the Government in the Legislative Council from November 1898 to September 1899. He briefly served as Minister of Justice from July to September 1899. He was also a member of the Carruthers ministry and its successor, the Wade ministry, again serving as Vice-President of the Executive Council and Representative of the Government in the Legislative Council from August 1904 to October 1910.

== Later life and legacy ==
Hughes died in North Sydney on 18 December 1912 (aged 55).

He was the father of rugby union players James Hughes (1886–1943) and Bryan Desmond Hughes (1888–1918; killed in the First World War).

== Honours ==
He was created Knight Commander of St Gregory by Pope Leo XIII in 1903.

Parliament of New South Wales
Political offices
Preceded by Andrew Garran	Vice-President of the Executive Council; 1898 – 1899	Succeeded by William Lyne
Preceded by Andrew Garran	Representative of the Government in the Legislative Council; 1898 – 1899	Succeeded by Kenneth Mackay
Preceded by Charles Lee	Minister of Justice; Jul – Sep 1899	Succeeded by William Wood
Preceded by Kenneth Mackay	Vice-President of the Executive Council; Representative of the Government in the Legislative Council; 1904 – 1910	Succeeded by Fred Flowers
