= Jono Jenkins =

- Born: Jonathon Jenkins; 26 May 1986 (age 40) Sydney, Australia
- Height: 1.86 m (6 ft 1 in)
- Weight: 100 kg (15 st 10 lb; 220 lb)
- School: Saint Ignatius' College, Riverview
- Notable relative(s): Alex Jenkins, Annabelle Jenkins, Georgia Jenkins, Ed Jenkins

Rugby union career
- Position: Openside Flanker
Senior career
Years	Team	Apps	(Points)
2003–12	Sydney University		
2012–	RC Narbonne	39	(15)
- Correct as of 12 February 2014
Super Rugby
Years	Team	Apps	(Points)
2010–11	Force	6	(0)
2012	Waratahs	9	(0)
- Correct as of 24 July 2012

Jono Jenkins (born 26 May 1986 in Sydney, Australia) is a rugby union footballer. He plays for the RC Narbonne in Pro D2 having previously represented the Waratahs. His regular playing position is openside flanker. Jenkins was educated at Saint Ignatius' College, Riverview in Sydney.

He made his senior debut for the Force during the 2010 Super 14 season against the Reds.

He has a brother Ed Jenkins who also plays rugby and was the captain of the Australia national rugby sevens team.
