= Bryan Desmond Hughes =

Australia international rugby union player (1888–1918)

Bryan Hughes
- Born: Bryan Desmond Hughes; 1888 Sydney
- Died: 6 August 1918 France

Rugby union career
- Position: Flanker
International career
Years	Team	Apps	(Points)
1913	Wallabies	2	(4)

Bryan Desmond Hughes MC (1888 – 6 August 1918) was an Australian soldier and international rugby union player. He was one of a number of Australian rugby internationals who were killed during the First World War.

== Early life ==
Bryan Hughes was born in Sydney, the son of the Hon. John Francis Hughes and his wife, Mary Rose Gilhooley. His elder brother James was also an Australian rugby union representative player. He attended Saint Ignatius' College, Riverview. Playing as a flanker, Hughes claimed two international rugby caps for Australia.

== Military service ==
Placed into action during World War I as a second lieutenant with the 8th Battalion, 48th Brigade of the 16th (Irish) Division, and with the 1st Battalion, Royal Dublin Fusiliers, Hughes was awarded the Military Cross. He was killed on 6 August 1918, and is buried at the British Cemetery in Borre, Nord, France (Grave II. G. 2).

=== International appearances ===
Opposition	Score	Result	Date	Venue	Ref(s)
New Zealand	13–25	Lost	13 September 1913	Carisbrook, Dunedin, New Zealand	
New Zealand	16–5	Won	20 September 1913	Lancaster Park, Christchurch, New Zealand	

== See also ==
- List of international rugby union players killed in action during the First World War
