= Joseph Donnelly (cricketer) =

Irish cricketer

Joseph Aloysius Donnelly
Personal information
- Full name: Joseph Aloysius Donnelly
- Born: 1888; Belfast, Ireland
- Died: Unknown

Domestic team information
- Years: Team
- 1914: Ireland

Career statistics
Competition	First-class
Matches	1
Runs scored	65
Batting average	32.50
100s/50s	0/1
Top score	59
Catches/stumpings	1/–
- Source: Cricinfo, 2 January 2022

Joseph Aloysius Donnelly (born 1888) was an Irish cricketer. He played once for the Ireland cricket team, a first-class match against Scotland in July 1914.
