= Ed Jenkins (rugby union) =

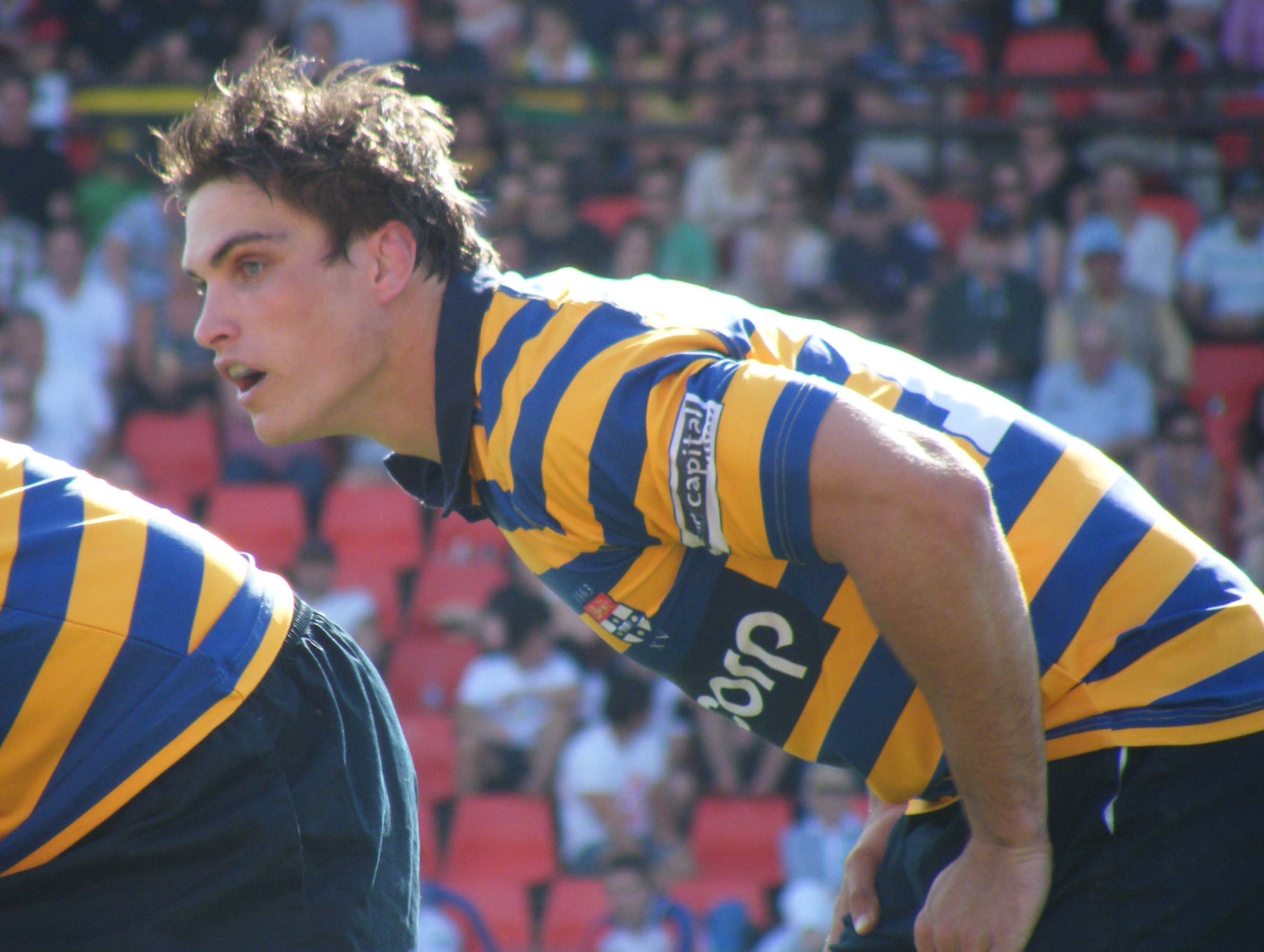
- Full name: Edward Jenkins
- Born: 26 May 1986 (age 40) Sydney, New South Wales, Australia
- Height: 1.85 m (6 ft 1 in)
- Weight: 92 kg (203 lb; 14 st 7 lb)
- School: Saint Ignatius' College, Riverview
- University: Sydney University
- Notable relative: Jono Jenkins

Rugby union career
Amateur team(s)
Years	Team	Apps	(Points)
2007–2010	NSW Academy		
Senior career
Years	Team	Apps	(Points)
2007	Perth Spirit		
International career
Years	Team	Apps	(Points)
2007–2018	Australia sevens	52	(547)

Edward Jenkins (born 26 May 1986) is the former captain of the Australia national rugby sevens team that competes in the IRB Sevens World Series. The most experienced campaigner in the youthful Australian Sevens squad, Jenkins is one of Australia's most capped sevens players.

Jenkins went to Saint Ignatius' College, Riverview in Sydney.

Jenkins helped end Australia's eight-year title drought on the world circuit at the 2010 London Sevens, scoring a try against Argentina in the semi-final on the way to Australia's first tournament win on the circuit since the 2002 Brisbane Sevens. Jenkins was a silver-medalist at the Rugby sevens at the 2010 Commonwealth Games. He led the Australian Sevens team to win the 2012 Japan Sevens. Jenkins captained the Australia side which won the 2012 Japan Sevens tournament. He competed at the 2016 Summer Olympics.

His identical twin brother Jono Jenkins plays Super Rugby for the Waratahs.

Jenkins played for the Perth Spirit in the Australian Rugby Championship in 2007, scoring a hat-trick of on debut against the East Coast Aces. He featured for the Shute Shield-winning Sydney University side throughout 2010 before Sevens duty saw him miss the finals series.

In January 2018, Jenkins retired after a shoulder injury in the 2017–18 World Rugby Sevens Series.
