= Joe Donnelly (rower) =

Australian rowing cox and coach

Personal information
- Nationality: Australian
- Born: 1951 (age 74–75)
- Education: St Ignatius' College, Riverview
- Years active: 1970–76

Sport
- Country: Australia
- Sport: Rowing
- Club: Sydney University Boat Club

Achievements and titles
- National finals: King's Cup 1973–75

Joe Donnelly (born 1951) is an Australian former national representative rowing coxswain and a rowing coach and administrator. As a coxswain he steered two Australian eights to World Championships. As a coach he contributed to the growth and development of rowing in Vietnam as the country's National Rowing Coach.

== Club and state rowing ==
Donnelley was educated at Riverview where he was introduced to rowing and coxing. His senior club rowing was from the Sydney University Boat Club.

At the Australian Rowing Championships in 1970 he raced in a composite Sydney Uni and UNSW crew contesting the men's coxed pair title. In 1972 he coxed the Sydney University eight which won the men's junior eight title and the Australian Championships. In 1974 he was in SUBC colours in a coxed pair and a coxed four which both placed second in their championship races.

His state representative debut for New South Wales came in the 1973 senior men's eight which contested the King's Cup at the Interstate Regatta within the Australian Rowing Championships. In 1974 and 1975 he was in the stern of the New South Wales men's eights which won consecutive King's Cups.

== International representative rowing ==
Donnelly, along with the coach and seven members of the victorious 1974 NSW King's Cup crew were selected as the Australian men's eight to compete at the 1974 World Rowing Championships in Lucerne. The eight finished in 2nd place in the petite final for an overall eight placing. The following year Donnelly was again in the stern of the Australian eight that finished in sixth place at the 1975 World Rowing Championships in Nottingham.

== Business career ==
An accountant, Donnelly spent much of his career as Bursar, Financial Controller and Business Manager at the Kinross Wolaroi School in Orange, New South Wales. He developed a rowing program at the school and from 1990 to 2013 was the Head Rowing Coach and Director of Rowing. By 2005 the fledgling program had developed such that the school had a boatshed on Spring Creek Dam and a fleet of 27 boats catering for 70 school rowers.

== Vietnam rowing coach ==
Donnelly started to coach and assist the Vietnam national rowing team in 2010 following a chance encounter with Vietnamese rowers when he was holidaying in the country in 2009. His personal involvement with the sport in Vietnam enabled the country to qualify a women's lightweight double scull at London 2012. The pair of Phạm Thị Hài and Phạm Thị Thảo were the first Vietnamese crew to ever qualify for the Olympic games. During the following Olympiad Donnelly assisted in the development of a national training program, enabling a Vietnamese women's lightweight double scull rowed by Tạ Thanh Huyền and Hồ Thị Lý to qualify and compete at Rio 2016. Their 2016 qualification was achieved on the back of the eight gold medals won by Vietnamese crews at the 2015 Southeast Asian Games.
