= Jose Seru =

Japanese rugby sevens player

- Born: 9 February 1991 (age 35) Fiji
- Height: 197 cm (6 ft 6 in)
- Weight: 112 kg (247 lb; 17 st 9 lb)

Rugby union career
- Position(s): Lock, Flanker, Number eight
Senior career
Years	Team	Apps	(Points)
2014–2020	Hokkaido Barbarians		
2020–2025	Kintetsu Liners	31	(35)
2025–	Mitsubishi Dynaboars	20	(5)
National sevens team
Years	Team		Comps
2018–2021	Japan		12

Jose Seru (born 9 February 1991) is a Japanese rugby union and sevens player. He competed in the men's tournament at the 2020 Summer Olympics. Born in Fiji, he moved to Japan in 2013 and became a citizen in 2020.
