= USC Trojans men's rugby =

US rugby union club, based in Los Angeles, CA

(United States) USC Men's Rugby
- Full name: USC Rugby Football Club
- Union: USA Rugby
- Nickname: Trojans
- Founded: 1886; 140 years ago
- Location: Los Angeles
- Region: Southern California
- Ground: Allyson Felix (Capacity: 1,000)
- President: Isshin Enta
- Director of Rugby: Joseph Krassenstein
- Coach(es): Riaz Fredericks, Sean Cooper
- Captain: Giorgio Grandi
- League: CRAA D1-AA
Team kit

Official website
- www.uscrugby.com

The USC Trojans Rugby Football Club is the official rugby union team of the University of Southern California. The club competes in the CRAA D1-AA Southwest Conference and Nationals annually.

The Trojans' home field is Allyson Felix Field, located in the heart of USC's University Park Campus in Los Angeles, California. The team's alumni, including notable former players Joseph Krassenstein and Sean Cooper, remain involved as assistant coaches, contributing to the rich tradition and ongoing success of the program.

== History ==
Rugby is USC's oldest club sport. The team was founded in 1886. It was briefly replaced by American Football at USC before a British professor on tenure brought the game back to the university in 1910.

The first issue of the student newspaper The Daily Trojan, then called The Daily Southern Californian, was published on 16 September 1912, and the first edition of the paper included announcements of tryouts for the USC rugby team.

USC Rugby Hall of Fame member Dave Lytle retired in 2015 after 28 years of coaching. In addition to his many victories, he holds the team record for the longest keg stand at 2 minutes, 23 seconds.

In 2009, USC beat UCLA 17–14, their first victory over the Bruins in many years and the last time they did in that decade. That team was undefeated in league play, beating California State University, Fullerton 51–12 in the championship. They went on to beat University of San Diego in the promotion match to earn a spot in Division I the following season.

In 2018, Coach Steve "Staggy" Stagg became head coach and led USC Rugby to beat the Bruins in the Coliseum in 2022. The team won the D1 Blue Division Nationals in Atlanta that same season. The season after, the team continued its glorious winning spell, conquering the GCCIR tournament and winning the finals against USD. In the Spring season of 2023, USC Rugby went to Maryland to compete in the top division for rugby in the US; due to extreme weather conditions, the tournament was suspended halfway through. In the fall season of 2023, USC Rugby clashed once more with USD in the GCCIR finals, this time a lack of depth in the squad due to multiple injuries caused the Trojans to fall short to USD losing 24–21.

USC Rugby is now coached by Riaz Fredericks. Coach Riaz took over the program in January 2024 after a 5-year spell as the head coach of the Tsunami Barbarians.

During the Spring season of 2025, USC Rugby dominated their competition in the GCCIR and won the Conference Championship by defeating Loyola Marymount University 15–36. The Trojans also qualified for the CRAA D2-AA National Championship and traveled to Indianapolis, Indiana to face off against the University of North Florida at Kuntz Stadium. The USC Rugby team defeated UNF by the score of 10-29 and brought the National Championship home to Los Angeles.

After the season, USC Rugby was promoted to the CRAA D1-AA Southwest Conference.

== Notable players ==
- Angelo Reviglio, Class of 2023
- Christian Kwan, Class of 2022
- Corbin Bennett, Class of 2017
- Sean "Poker Face" Cooper, Class of 2017
- Joseph Krassenstein, Class of 2015
- Zach Timm, Class of 2013
- John Akiba, Class of 2014
- Todd Lorell, Class of 2010
- Austin Reed, Class of 2010
- Gareth Williams, Class of 2009
- Sean Sullivan, class of 1993
- Jonathan Freeman, Class of 1992 (Post-Grad)
- Dave Lytle, Class of 1986
- Tom Barrack, Class of 1969
- Harry "Blackjack" Smith, Class of 1939
- Payton Jordan, Class of 1939
