= James Hughes (rugby union) =

Australia international rugby union player (1886–1943)

Dr. James Hughes
- Born: James Charles Hughes; 1886 Sydney
- Died: April 1943
- School: Saint Ignatius' College, Riverview
- University: Sydney University

Rugby union career
- Position: flanker
International career
Years	Team	Apps	(Points)
1907	Wallabies	2	(0)

James Charles Hughes (1886 – April 1943) was an Australian medical practitioner and rugby union player who represented Australia.

Hughes, a flanker, was born in Sydney and claimed a total of 2 international rugby caps for Australia. His brother Bryan was also an Australian rugby union representative player.
