= Saint Ignatius' College, Riverview =

School for boys in Sydney, Australia

Saint Ignatius' College Riverview
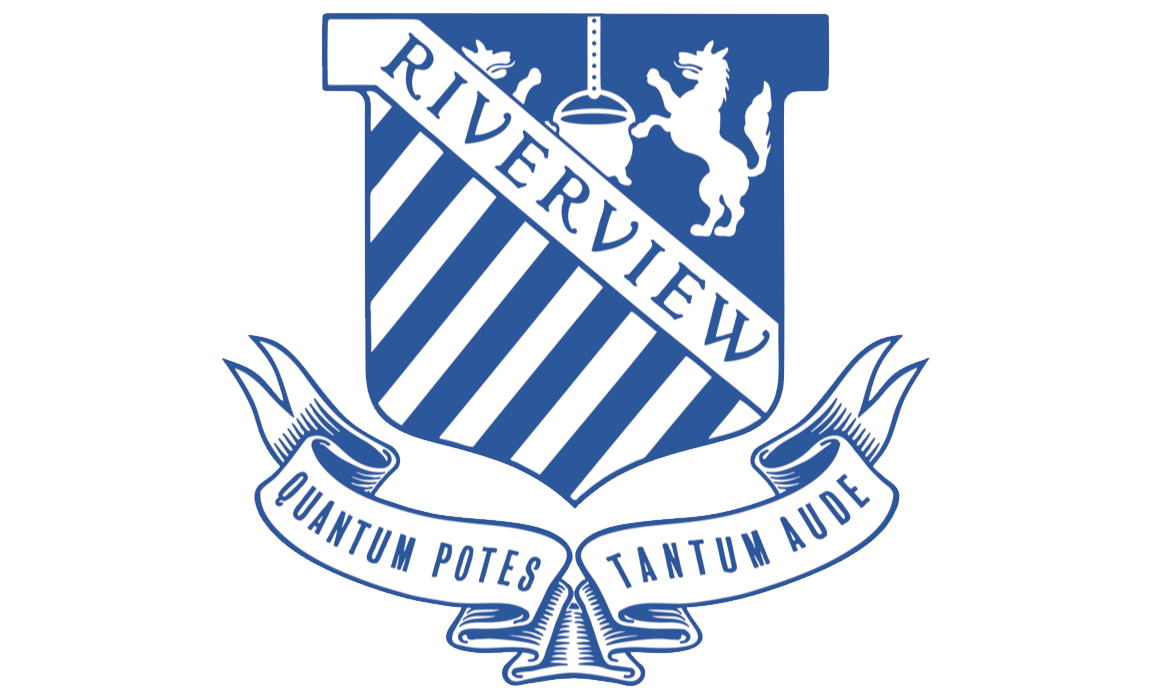

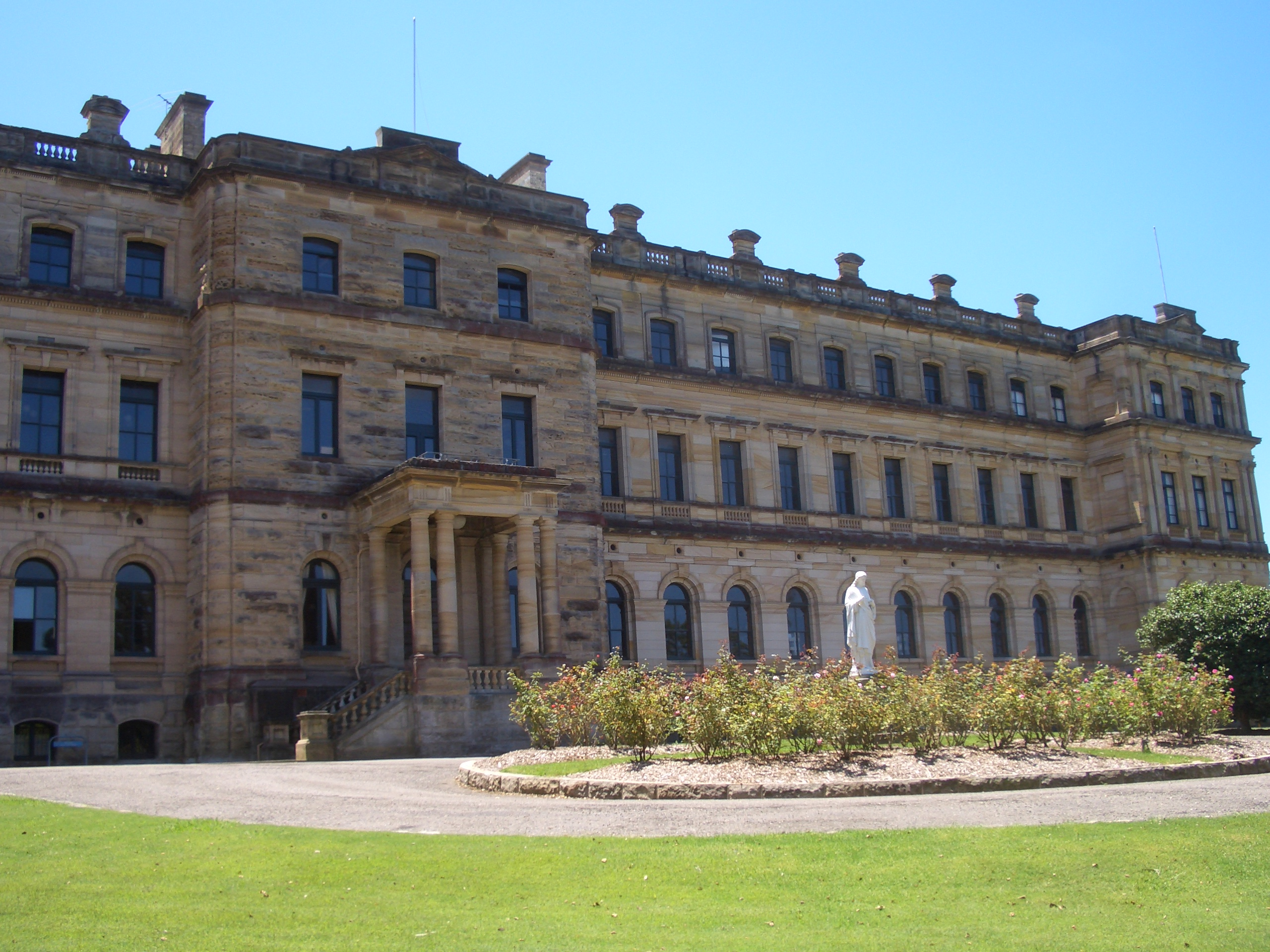
- Main building, St Ignatius' College

Location
- Riverview, Lower North Shore; Sydney; Australia; 33°49′29″S 151°09′44″E

Information
- Type: Independent, day and boarding school
- Motto: Latin: Quantum Potes Tantum Aude; English: "As much as you can do, so much dare to do"
- Religious affiliation: Roman Catholic (Jesuit)
- Patron saint: Saint Ignatius of Loyola
- Established: 1880; 146 years ago
- Founder: Joseph Dalton, SJ
- Educational authority: New South Wales Department of Education
- Rector: Tom Renshaw, SJ
- Principal: Mark Tannock
- Chaplain: Joseph Dooley SJ
- Staff: ~179
- Years: 5–12
- Gender: Male
- Enrolment: ~1,560 (2006)
- Campus type: Suburban
- Colours: Royal blue and white
- Affiliations: Association of Heads of Independent Schools of Australia; Junior School Heads Association of Australia; Australian Boarding Schools' Association; Athletic Association of the Great Public Schools of New South Wales; Jesuit and Companion Schools in Australia
- Alumni: Riverview Old Ignatians
- Website: www.riverview.nsw.edu.au

Saint Ignatius' College Riverview is an Australian independent single-sex primary and secondary day and boarding school for boys located in Riverview, a small suburb on the Lane Cove River on the Lower North Shore of Sydney.

Established in 1880 by Joseph Dalton SJ, Saint Ignatius' is a Jesuit school in the tradition of Saint Ignatius of Loyola. It is part of the international network of Jesuit schools that began in Messina, Sicily in 1548. Saint Ignatius' College has a non-selective enrolment policy and currently caters for approximately 1,560 students from Years 5 to 12, including 335 boarders in Years 6 to 12.

The College is a member of the Association of Heads of Independent Schools of Australia (AHISA), the Junior School Heads Association of Australia (JSHAA), the Australian Boarding Schools' Association, and is a founding member of the Athletic Association of the Great Public Schools of New South Wales (AAGPS).

Numerous leading contributors to Australian politics, arts, law, religion and sport were educated at Riverview. Notable alumni include former Prime Minister of Australia Tony Abbott; former Deputy Prime Minister of Australia Barnaby Joyce; former Chief Justice of New South Wales, Tom Bathurst; the current Archbishop of Sydney, Anthony Fisher OP; former Premier of New South Wales Nick Greiner; seventeen former Wallabies, nine Olympians and eight Rhodes Scholars; as well as the first Australian-born astronaut, Paul Scully-Power, and numerous writers including poet Christopher Brennan, art critic Robert Hughes, and playwrights Nick Enright and Justin Fleming.

== History ==
Following Archbishop Roger William Bede Vaughan OSB's invitation to the Jesuits to come to Sydney, on condition that they open a boys' boarding school, and the bequest of Fr John Joseph Therry, who on his death in 1864 left the greater part of his property to the Society of Jesus, Joseph Dalton SJ concluded arrangements for the purchase of the Riverview property on 28 June 1878. Dalton became founding rector of the college.

The first students were brought to the school as advertised in the Catholic newspaper The Express, whereby boys aged between 8 and 12 would be received at Riverview "as soon as possible after the Christmas holidays". Classes commenced with two students on 11 February 1880, in a small stone cottage on the Riverview estate.

The original cottage became very cramped with greater numbers and, to provide better accommodation, St Michael's House was built. The building was designed by W. W. Wardell and opened on the feast of Saint Michael, 29 September 1880. In 1882 a wooden boatshed was built for rowing and in 1883 the infirmary took shape.

In its early years the college offered classical and modern languages, history, mathematics, the natural sciences and all other branches required for the civil service, the junior, senior and matriculation examinations, along with modern mercantile subjects.

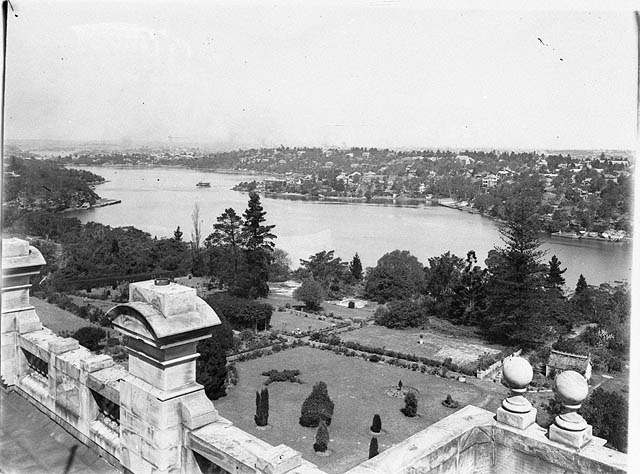
St Ignatius' campus viewed from main building, 1930s

By December 1882, with an enrolment of only 70 boys, the college extended the curriculum to include English composition, writing, music, singing, drawing, painting, Irish history and oral Latin.

Lessons were taught six days a week. Prayers began the day at 6.15 am, followed by Mass and study before breakfast at 8.30 am and concluded with night prayers at 8.30 pm. On Sundays and holidays the boys were allowed to sleep in until 6.30 am.

Within seven years of its founding, keen observers were taking notice. In 1887, James Francis Hogan wrote in The Irish in Australia that:

"St. John's College, affiliated to the University of Sydney; St. Ignatius' College, Riverview, conducted by the Jesuit Fathers; and St. Joseph's College, Hunter Hill [sic], under the management of the Marist Fathers [sic, actually the Marist Brothers], are three educational institutions that reflect the highest credit on the Catholic population of the parent colony".

The main building of the college was constructed in three stages between 1885 and 1930 and the foundation stone was laid by Cardinal Moran, Archbishop of Sydney, on 15 December 1885.

As originally designed by Gilbert, Dennehy and Tappin, of Ballarat, the building was to be a huge square, representing four identical fronts, but only the South front was completed according to plan due to financial constraints.

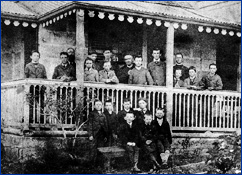
Earliest known school group photo, 1880s

The Riverview College Observatory was built in 1909, and was established by the distinguished Jesuit astronomer and seismologist, Edward Francis Pigot (1858–1929), who ordered a complete set of seismographs from Göttingen.

Daniel O'Connell was director of the Observatory from 1938 and was later called to be director of the Vatican Observatory. Another distinguished Jesuit seismologist and astronomer, Thomas Burke-Gaffney, became assistant-director of the Observatory in 1946 and director from 1952. His studies of seismic aspects of nuclear explosions garnered worldwide attention and he served as vice-president of the Royal Society of New South Wales.

The Dalton Memorial Chapel was also built in 1909. The organ in the chapel was built in 1910 at a cost of £460 by Charles Richardson and installed in 1911. By the 1970s the organ was becoming unreliable and the college organist at the time, Peter Meyer, contracted Arthur Jones to rebuild it in 1976.

Although the first dayboys were not officially admitted until 1923, there was a small group of pupils who were permitted to attend the college as dayboys. In fact, up until the 1960s dayboys remained relatively small in number and Riverview was mainly for boarders.

In the lead up to the 2003 Iraq War, the three school captains wrote a letter to the Prime Minister of Australia, John Howard, calling for a withdrawal of Australian troops from the Persian Gulf and for a non-military solution. They told Howard a poll of 574 students at the college showed 75 per cent were against Australian military participation in Iraq, regardless of the United Nations’ position.

During February 2005, students sang for Pope John Paul II outside his hospital in Rome as part of the 2005 Pilgrimage of Hope. The students had previously met the Anglican Archbishop of Canterbury, Rowan Williams, meditated in Assisi and worked the streets and orphanages of Calcutta with Mother Teresa's Missionaries of Charity.

== Motto ==
The school motto, Quantum Potes Tantum Aude ("Dare as much as you can, for God and for Man"), was introduced by the rector-headmaster, Thomas Gartlan SJ, in 1906. Quantum Potes Tantum Aude is now formally translated from Latin as "As much as you can do, so much dare to do", seen to best reflect the Latin, replacing the former "Dare to do your Best". The motto is taken from a song of Saint Thomas Aquinas (1227–1274) entitled Lauda Sion Salvatorem ('Praise, O Sion, Praise Thy Saviour'). The next line after Quantum Potes Tantum Aude is Quia Maior Omni Laude, which, together, translates to "As much as you can do, so much dare to do, because He is above all praise".

== Traditions ==
It is a longstanding practice for students, particularly in the lower years of the college, to write "A.M.D.G" in the top left-hand corner of any piece of work they do. This stands for "Ad Maiorem Dei Gloriam" which means "To the Greater Glory of God": a central theme of Jesuit spirituality. Traditionally, at the end of a piece of work they wrote "L.D.S." in the center of the page, a practice which is no longer widespread. This stands for "Laus Deo Semper" which means "Praise to God Always", another traditional Jesuit motto. The college song is "Ignatius Teach Us to Know".

== Jesuit education ==
A former Society of Jesus Superior General, Peter Hans Kolvenbach, wrote in The Characteristics of Jesuit Education that the "ideal is the well-rounded person who is intellectually competent, open to growth, religious, loving and committed to doing justice in generosity to the people of God".

Riverview's Jesuit partner schools include St Aloysius' College in Sydney, Saint Ignatius' College, Adelaide, Xavier College in Melbourne, Loyola College, Mount Druitt, Clongowes Wood College in County Kildare, Ireland, Belvedere College in County Dublin, Ireland and Stonyhurst College in Lancashire, England.

== Co-curriculum ==
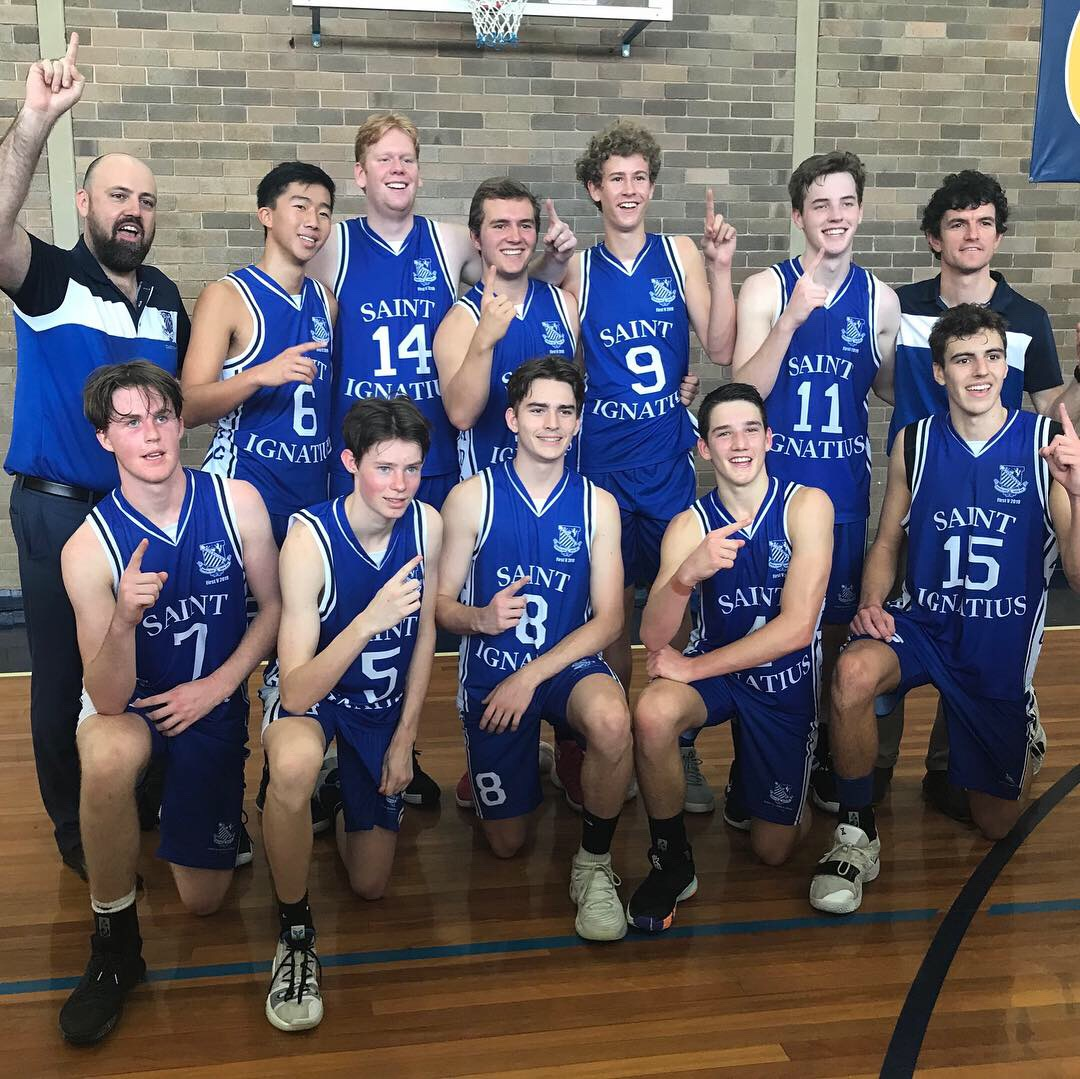
2019 Riverview 1st V Basketball Team

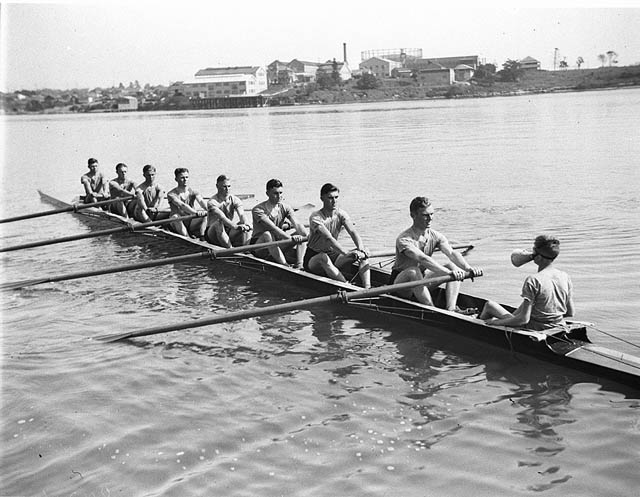
Students rowing in 1932

St Ignatius' College offers students the opportunity to participate in a number of co-curricular activities including:

- AT Thomas Advocacy Group, ATTAG ('ay-tag') formed in 2012 to increase the social awareness among students at the school. Named after an Indian Jesuit martyr who gave his life in defending the rights of the 'dalit' untouchables, this group effectively replaced the Amnesty International Club (1980s–2007).
- Debating and Public speaking: (1881–present) 35 GPS 1sts Premiership Winning Teams (since 1964), and 5 between 1920 and 1963, 22 Lawrence Campbell Oratory Winners since its institution in 1935, 12 Australian Schools Debating team members (some students for 2 years) (instituted 1972–present) and 31 NSW School Debating team members (instituted 1971–present) (some students for 2 years).
- St Ignatius' College also offers a range of co-curricular activities including music, drama, and digital media and photography.

=== Sport ===
- Australian rules football: (1880–1892 and 1984–present) Until the start of the 1892 winter, Riverview's football preference had been for Australian rules football. In 2004, Riverview became the first GPS school to field an Australian Rules team in the under-18s division of the Sydney Football League. Since entering the competition in 2004, Riverview has won two premierships, in 2005 and 2011. Since 2016, Riverview has moved to AFL Sydney's Independent Schools Competition (Composed of CAS and AAGPS schools), with the 1st XVIII winning the competition 5 times (2016, 2017, 2018, 2020, 2022) from a possible 6 opportunities (note 2021 was voided due to COVID-19 Pandemic). The First XVIII's 2022 premiership saw them crowned as the first-ever Independent Schools Competition champions, going through the regular season and the inaugural finals series undefeated defeating Newington in the Grand Final at Jubilee Stadium Kogarah 11.7–73 – 2.7–19.
- Basketball: Riverview have won the AAGPS title twice; in 1978, and most recently in 2019, breaking a 41-year premiership drought. The 1st V have also come second several times since 2000. In 2013 Riverview won the Raschke Cup, played at Newington College. The 2015/16 season was a notable successful season in the school's First Grade history, coming first in the All Australian Jesuit Cup, winning the Raschke Cup and coming third in the Sydney Schools Shootout. The 2018/19 season has been the most successful in the basketball program's history, with the team breaking the 41-year premiership drought in the Firsts competition, winning the GPS title. The 2019 First V also won the Raschke Cup (beating Sydney Grammar School in the final of the new tournament format 86–59), Division 1 Sydney Shootout and the Division 1 National Championship (held in Melbourne). The team was also crowned NSW Champion School for the first time in the program's history, defeating Westfield Sports High and Hunter Sports High, with 2nd V, also completing a three-peat of GPS championships.
- Rowing: Riverview was the second Sydney school to take to the water (after Sydney Grammar) and has a strong rowing tradition. Under Father Thomas Gartlan SJ, the school established a rowing program in 1882 at a time when there were only a handful of senior rowing clubs in existence on Sydney Harbour and its reaches. The Riverview Gold Cup regatta was inaugurated in 1885, is one of the oldest continuing regattas in Australia, and has been a key fixture of the Sydney rowing calendar for senior and school oarsmen ever since. The year 1997 was the first year Riverview 1st VIII won the Gold Cup Regatta (Open Men's Eights) this crew was stroked by Olympian Daniel Noonan. The school's boatshed joined the New South Wales Rowing Association in 1889. The facilities are on the Lane Cove River with Riverview the only school in Sydney whose boatshed and pontoon are on the main school campus.
- Rugby union: Rugby union has been the major winter sport at Riverview since 1892. Riverview has always fielded formidable rugby sides with the sport ingrained in the robust culture of the school. Sport is compulsory at Riverview, until the 1980s rugby was the only winter sport offered. To this day, the 3rd, 2nd and 1st XV are strongly supported by the students with "War Cries" at each game. 17 Wallabies have attended Riverview so far, the first was Ignatius O’Donnell to run on against the British Isles at the SCG in 1899, he was Wallaby No. 29. The 1st XV are awarded distinctive wide Royal Blue and White striped jersey (referred to as "wide stripes"), just prior the first official GPS game at a full school assembly. These jerseys stand out from other school jerseys and are well respected by the students.
- Surf Lifesaving: (1987–present) Riverview commenced active participation in lifesaving as a sport in the 1986–1987 summer season.
- Tennis: Riverview has a storied history in AAGPS Tennis, with 11 Firsts premierships and 16 Seconds premierships. Notably, the College won 5 Firsts premierships in a row between 1998–2002, and 13 Seconds premierships in 14 years between 1994–2007.
- Athletics
- Baseball: (?–2019)
- Cricket
- Cross country
- Fencing
- Futsal: (?–2020)
- Golf
- Martial arts
- Mountain biking
- Sailing
- Rifle Club and Cadets: (1885–1974)
- Swimming
- Table tennis
- Volleyball
- Water polo

== House system ==
The House system was established in 1983 with the aim of improving the quality of care for students. There are sixteen Houses, each consisting of approximately 85 boys from Years 7–12, with a Housemaster and five tutors in each House. Housemasters are concerned with the academic and pastoral development of boys under their care. In so doing, the House System at Riverview aims to develop the "well-rounded person", as Peter Hans Kolvenbach SJ emphasised in the Characteristics of Jesuit Education:

"In a Jesuit School the atmosphere is one in which all can live and work together in understanding and love, with respect for all men and women as Children of God. Jesuit Education insists on individual care and concern for each person...Cura Personalis (concern for the individual person) remains a basic characteristic of Jesuit Education".

From an initial eight Houses in 1983, four more were added in 1997 and another four were added in 2014 to reflect the growth in the student population.

Each House is divided into five mentor groups made up of students from Years 7 to 12. Approximately three students from each of these year groups are in every mentor group, led by a senior teacher. Mentor Groups meet after recess every day for 12 minutes.

House	Colour(s)	Patron
Campion		Saint Edmund Campion, S.J.
Cheshire		Leonard Cheshire
Chisholm		Caroline Chisholm
Claver		Saint Peter Claver, S.J.
Dalton		Fr Joseph Dalton, S.J.
Fernando		Richie Fernando, S.J.
Gonzaga		Saint Aloysius de Gonzaga, S.J.
Mackillop		Saint Mary of the Cross MacKillop RSJ
More		Saint Thomas More
Owen		Saint Nicholas Owen, S.J.
Romero		Saint Óscar Romero
Ricci		Fr Matteo Ricci, S.J.
Smith		Coleen Shirley Perry Smith
Southwell		Saint Robert Southwell, S.J.
Teresa		Saint Teresa of Calcutta Mother Teresa, MC
Xavier		Saint Francis Xavier, S.J.

== Boarding ==
With a boarding student population of 335, Riverview is one of the largest boarding schools in New South Wales. Boarders are spread across 3 boarding houses on the College Campuses, including Fr Charles Fraser House (holding Years 6–8), St Johns House (Years 9–10) and Kevin Fagan House (Years 11–12). Officially a boarding-only school until the 1920s, the Day Boys remained a small minority until the late 1960s. The College now has a majority of day-boys.

== Old Ignatian Union ==
Established in 1897, the alumni association of Saint Ignatius' College is named the Old Ignatians' Union or OIU, and has a mission to "sustain and strengthen the connection between Old Ignatians and to further the interests of the College." Reunions and fundraisers are held to help the Development Office fundraise bursaries. Old Boys also partake in sporting competitions through such institutions as the Old Ignatians Rugby Club.

=== Notable alumni ===
Alumnus of Saint Ignatius' College are known as Old Ignatians. For a list of notable Old Ignatians, see List of Riverview Old Ignatians.

== Gallery ==
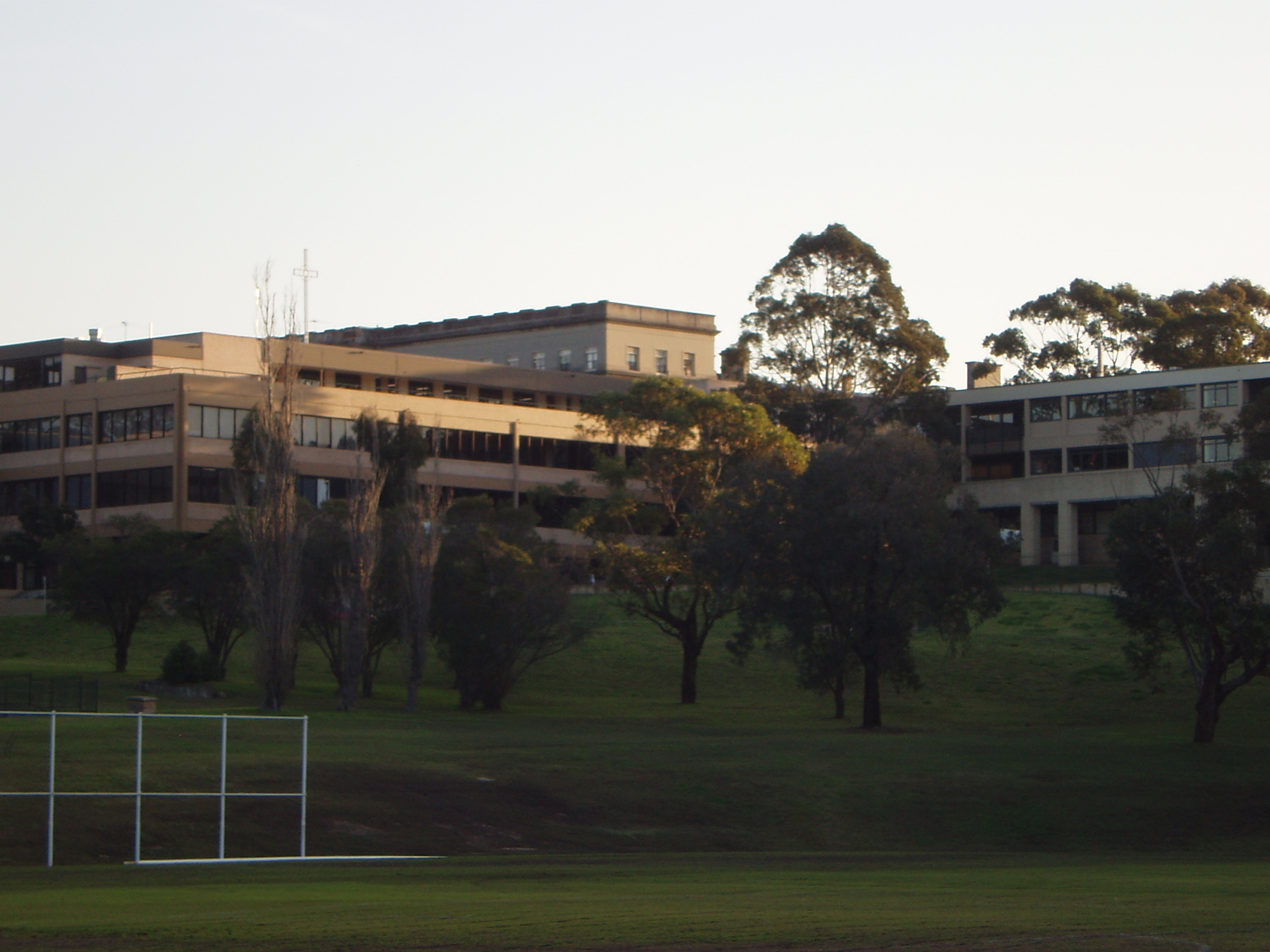
Wallace Wing, Main Building, Middle School from First Field

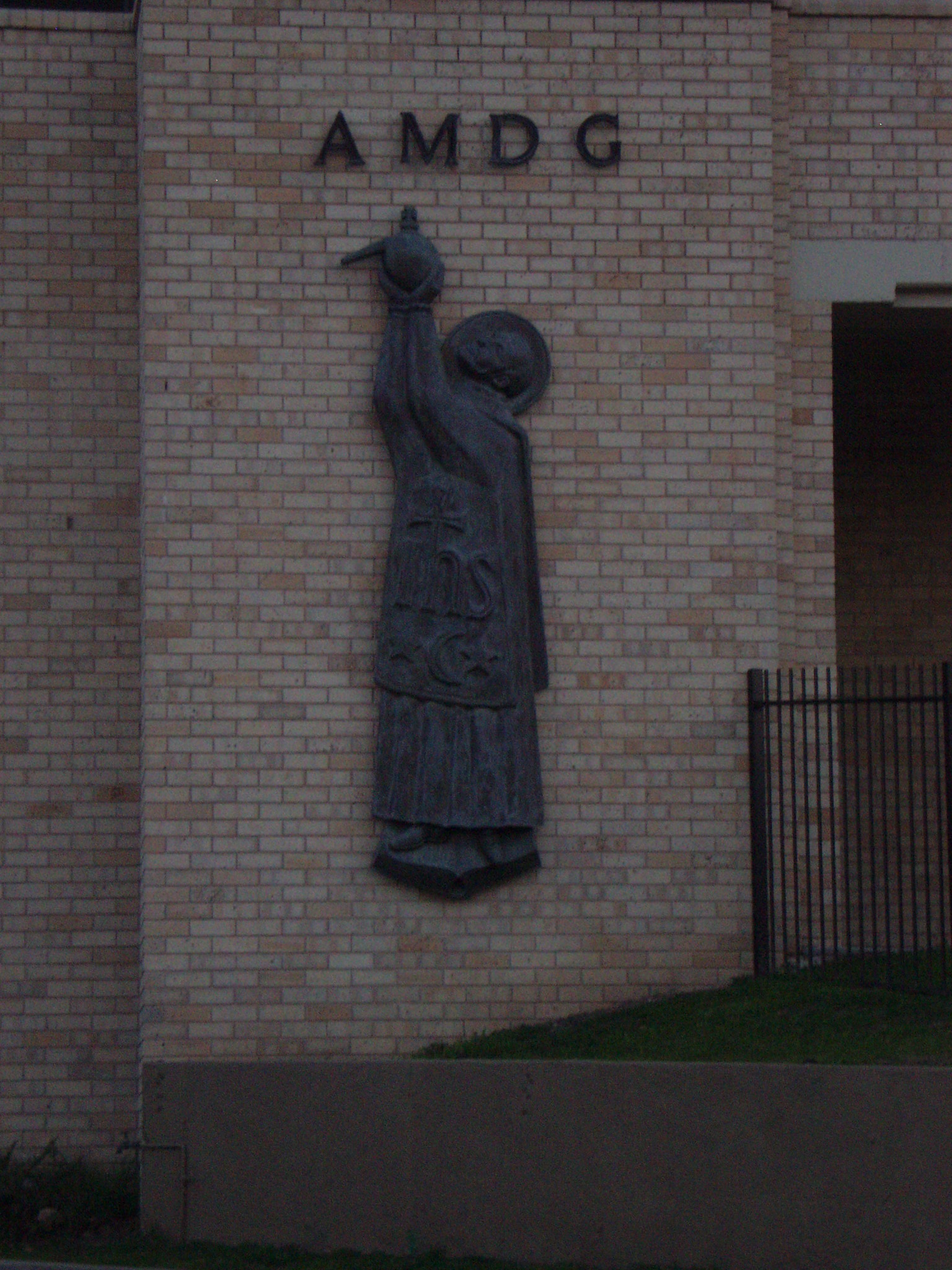
AMDG: Statue of St Ignatius below Ramsay Hall

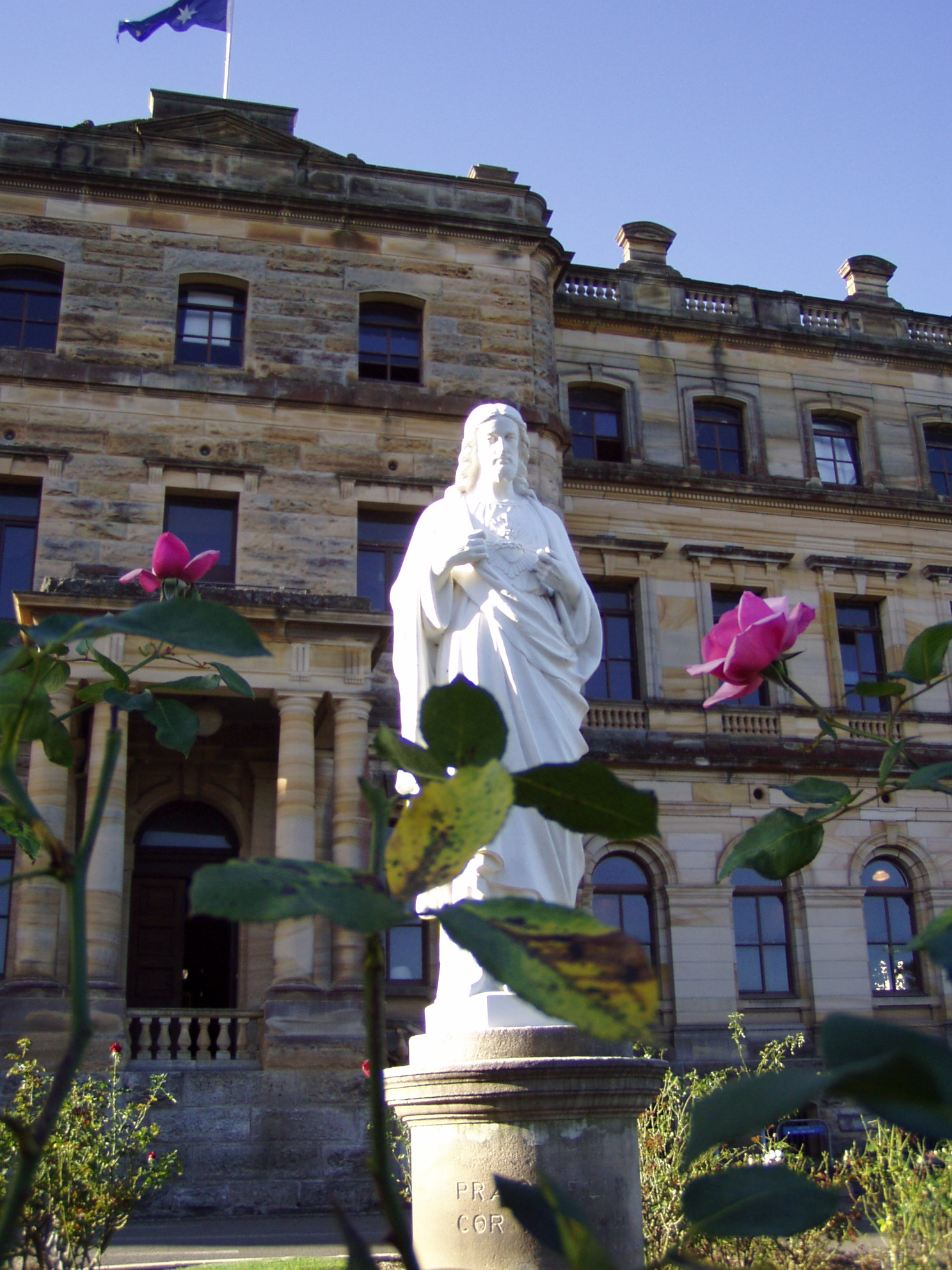
Statue of the Sacred Heart in Rose Garden; Main Building

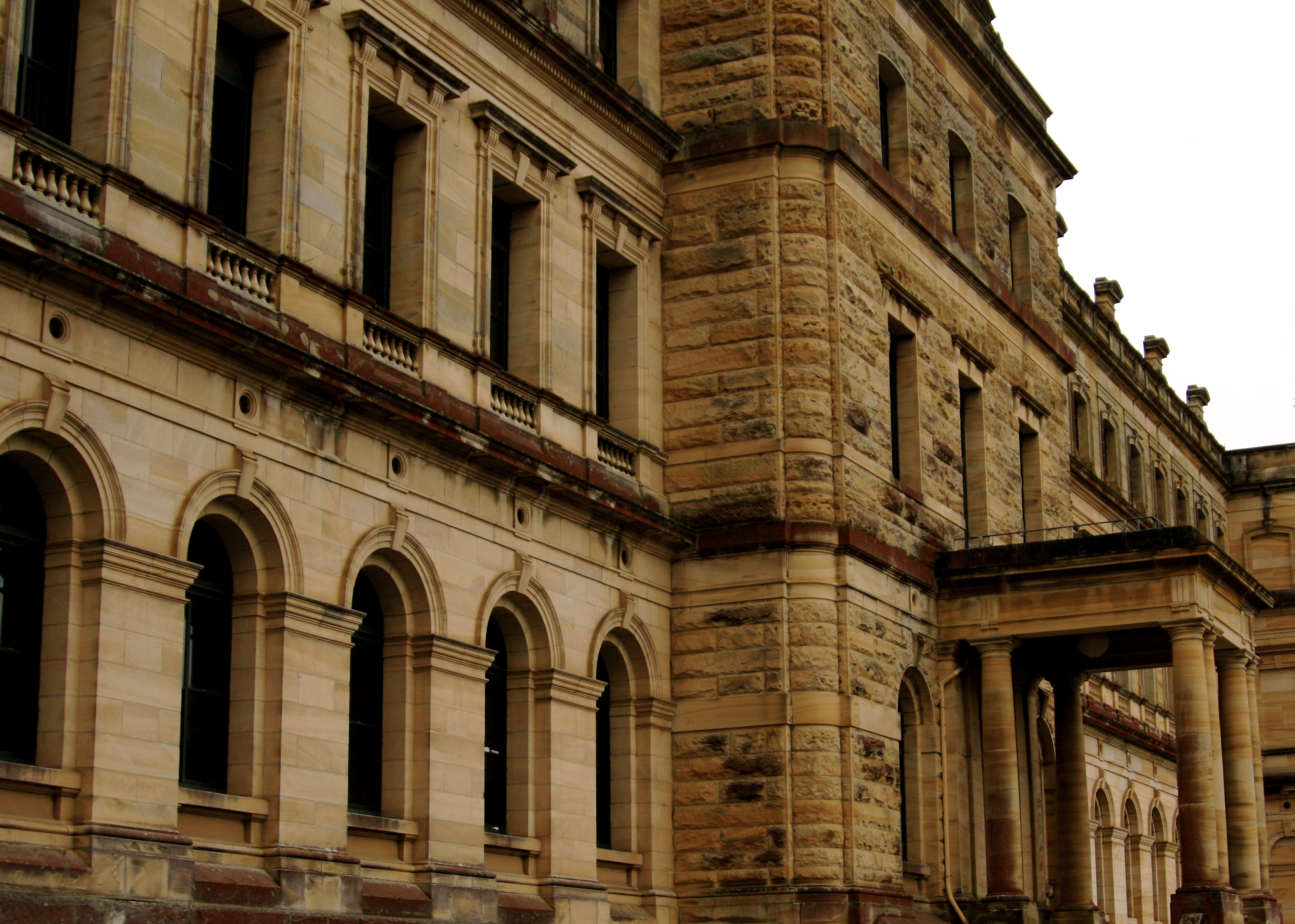
Main Building 2009, St Ignatius' College

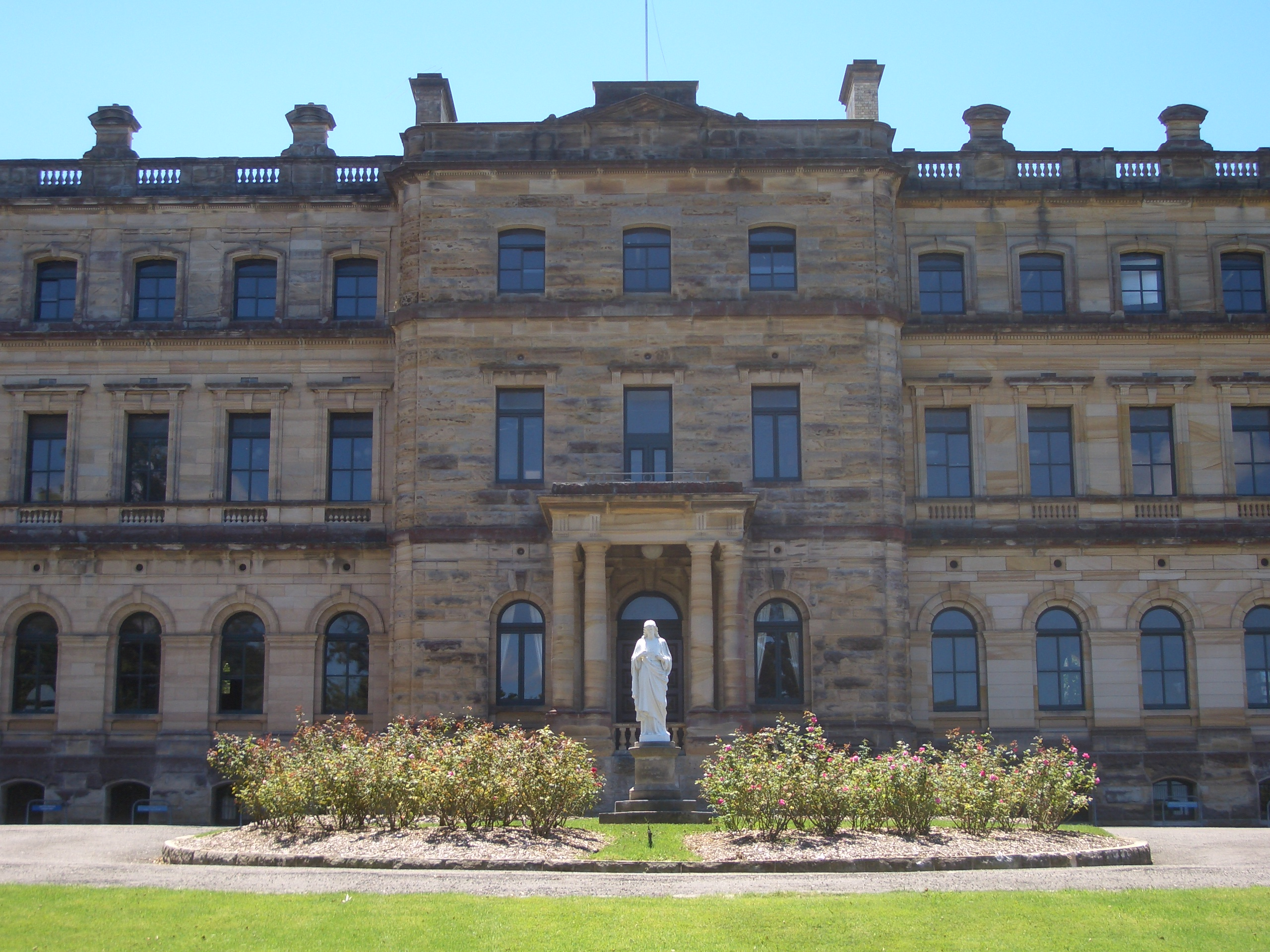
Main Building, St Ignatius' College

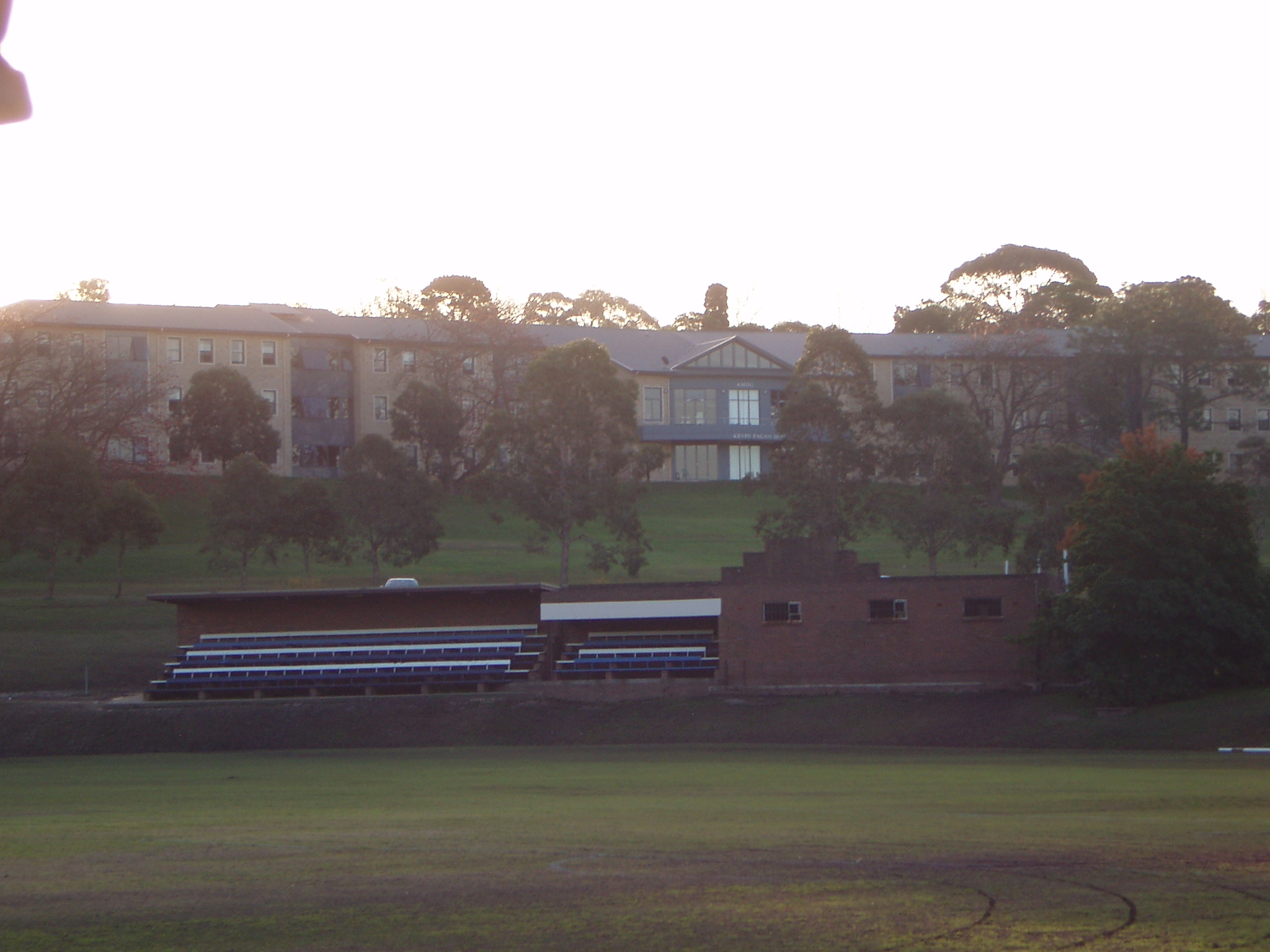
Kevin Fagan House behind First Field's Away Grandstand

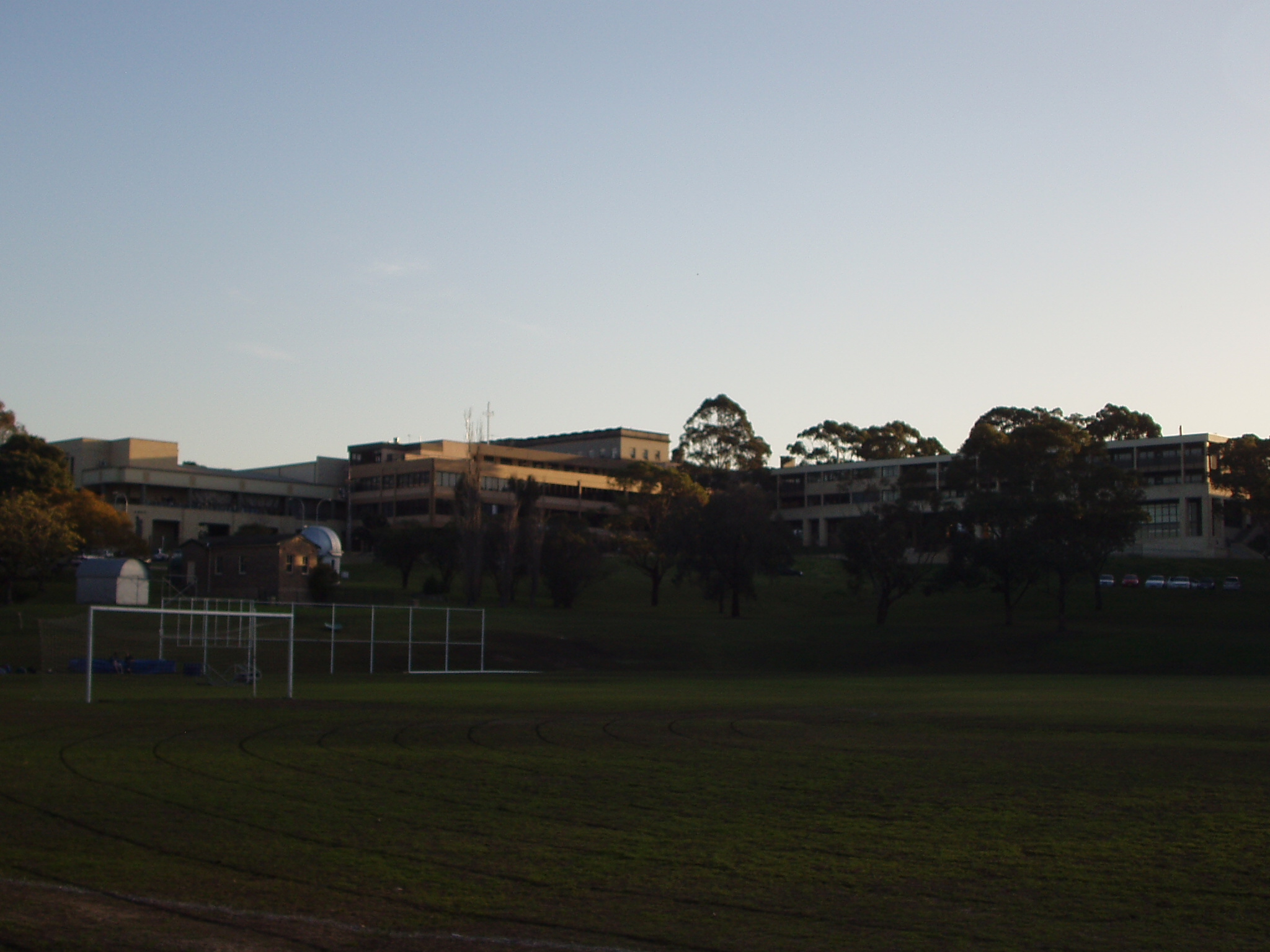
College from First Field

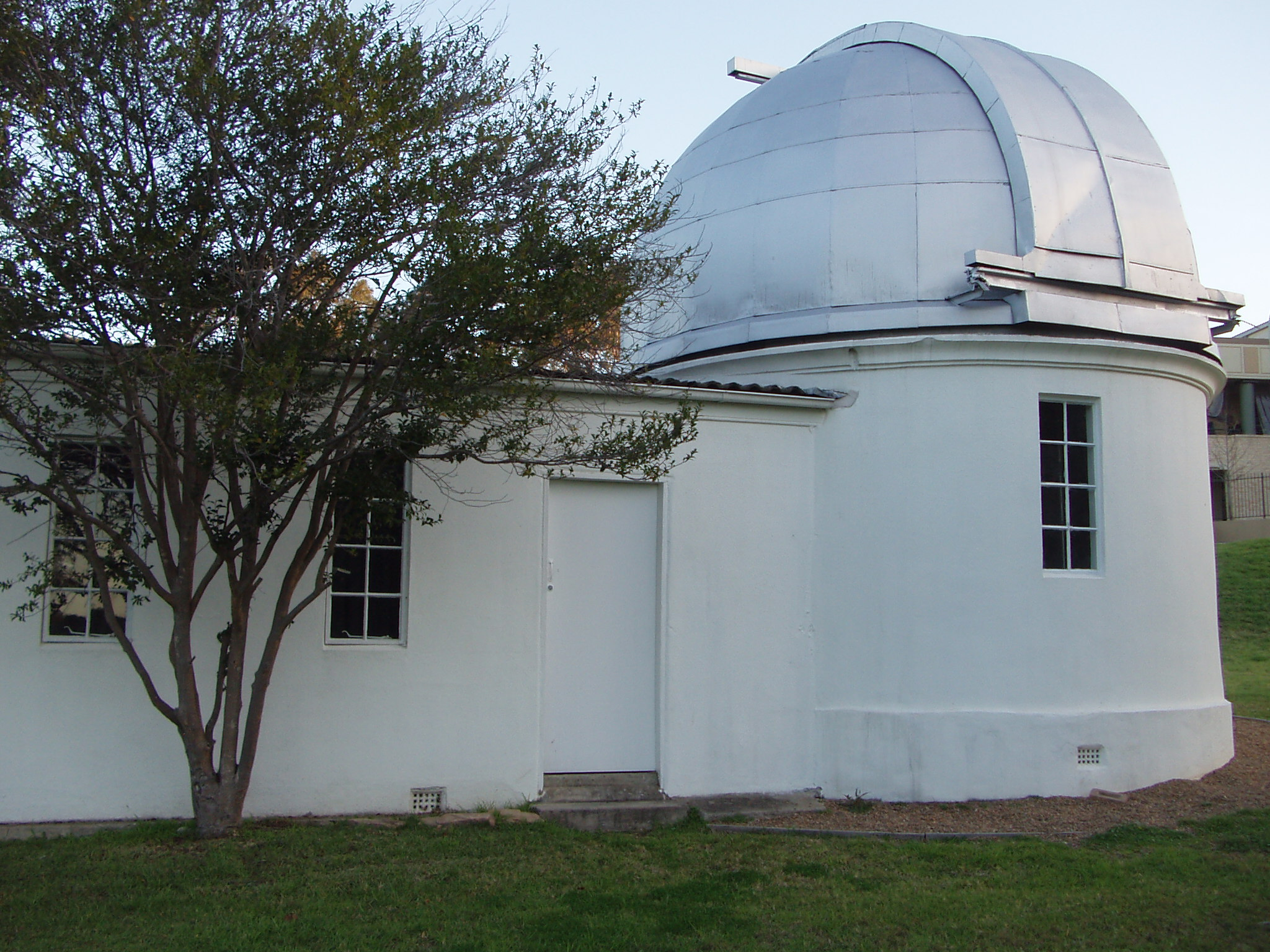
College Observatory

== See also ==
- List of Catholic schools in New South Wales
- Catholic education in Australia
- List of boarding schools in Australia
- Lawrence Campbell Oratory Competition
- Old Ignatians' Rugby Football Club
- List of Jesuit sites
