= 1981 Campeonato Argentino de Rugby =

37° Campeonato Argentino de Mayores
- Countries: Argentina
- Number of teams: 15
- Champions: Buenos Aires (18th title)
- Runners-up: Tucumàn

The Campeonato Argentino de Rugby 1981 was won by selection of Buenos Aires that beat in the final the selection of Unión de Rugby de Tucumàn

== Rugby Union in Argentina in 1981 ==
=== National ===
- The Buenos Aires Championship was won by C.A.S.I.
- The Cordoba Province Championship was won by Tala
- The North-East Championship was won by Lawn Tennis
- The selection of Buenos Aires won also the "Campeonato Juvenil" (under-19)

=== International ===
- England made a tour in Argentina played two times against "Pumas" in Buenos Aires . The Pumas made an historical draw in the first and lost the second.

== Preliminaries ==
=== Zone A ===
1st round
20 June	Chubut	-	Sur	16 - 24	Patoruzú R.C, Trelew
20 September	Mar del Plata	-	Rosario	6 - 18	Patoruzú R.C, Trelew

2nd round
2 September	Sur	-	Rosario	3 - 9	Patoruzú R.C, Trelew

=== Zone B ===
1st round
24 May	San Juan	-	Austral	3 - 0	San Juan
24 May	Rio Negro y Neuquén	-	Buenos Aires	6 - 55	San Juan

2nd round
25 May	San Juan	-	Buenos Aires	0 - 44	San Juan

=== Zone C ===
1st round
1 August	Santa Fe	-	Cuyo	6 - 55	Paraná E.R.

2nd round
2 August	Entre Rios	-	Cuyo	22 - 18	Paraná E.R.

=== Zone D ===
1st round
8 August	Córdoba	-	Noreste	72 - 3	Club Nautico, Cordoba

2nd round
9 August	Córdoba	-	Tucumán	12 - 24	Club Nautico, Cordoba

== Interzone ==
INTERZONE
9 July	Rosario	-	Buenos Aires	4 - 42	Plaza Jewell, Rosario

== Semifinals ==
11 October 1981

Buenos Aires	87-9	Salta

Salta
Referee: Edmundo Aguiar (Buenos Aires)

11 October 1981

Entre Rios	19-49	Tucumàn

Salta
Referee: Douglas Kerr (Buenos Aires)

== Final ==
12 October 1981

Buenos Aires	32-12	Tucumàn

Salta
Referee: Douglas Kerr (Buenos Aires)
