= 1999 Campeonato Argentino de Rugby =

Rugby union competition season

55° Campeonato Argentino
- Number of teams: 21
- Champions: Buenos Aires (28th title)
- Runners-up: Tucumàn

The Campeonato Argentino de Rugby 1999 was based on the selection of the Argentine Rugby Union (Unione di Buenos Aires).

The 21 teams participating were divided into three levels : "Campeonato", "Ascenso", "Promocional".

== Rugby Union in Argentina in 1999 ==
=== National ===
- The "Campeonato Argentino Menores de 21" (Under 21 championship) was won by Rosario
- The "Campeonato Argentino Menores de 19" (Under 19 championship) was won by Tucumán.
- The "National Championship for clubs" was won by La Tablada
- The first edition of Torneo del Interior (tournament with club outside Buenos Aires) was won by Jockey Club Córdoba
- The "Torneo de la URBA" (Buenos Aires) was won by San Isidro Club
- The "Cordoba Province Championship" was won by Tala
- The North-East Championship was won by Huirapuca

=== International ===
- It was a great year for Argentina Rugby Union: at the 1999 Rugby World Cup, the "Pumas" obtained an historical qualification to the quarter-finals, beating Ireland in the play-off. In the quarter-final the Pumas were beaten by France.
- Previously in August, Argentina visited Scotland and Ireland for a four match tour, in order to prepare the World Cup. A victory against Scotland and a loss with Ireland, are the most important results.
- In June was Wales to visit Argentina for a five match tour, winning both the test with Pumas (36-26 and 23-16)
- In June France visit Argentina, and won both test with "Pumas" (35-18 and 37-12)
- In August, is Romania to visit Argentina, for a five match tour, The test is won by Pumas 68-22
- Argentina national team, in September visit Japan for a short tour (two matches). With an experimental team. lost the test match against Japan national team (29-44). In November, The Pumas visit Europe. Played six match, with three losses with Italy, France and Wales in the test match.
- In October, Argentina, won as usual the 1998 South American Rugby Championship
- In April there were the events for the "Centenary of Argentine Rugby". In 17 April, there was a match between the Pumas and an international selection called "Resto del Mundo" (Rest of the World). The "Pumas" won 49–21.

== "Campeonato" ==
There were no relegation due to the return to an "eight teams formula" per 2000.

1.Round
6 March	Cuyo	-	Córdoba	23 - 32	Mendoza
6 March	Mar del Plata	-	Tucumán	6 - 41	Mar del Plata
6 March	Rosario	-	Buenos Aires	10 - 37	Rosario

2.Round
13 March	Rosario	-	Mar del Plata	30 - 17	Rosario
13 March	Buenos Aires	-	Cuyo	91 - 3	Buenos Aires
13 March	Tucumán	-	Córdoba	29 - 9	Tucumán

3.Round
20 March	Cuyo	-	Rosario	60 - 17	Mendoza
20 March	Buenos Aires	-	Tucumán	30 - 16	Buenos Aires
20 March	Córdoba	-	Mar del Plata	39 - 20	Córdoba

4.Round
27 March	Rosario	-	Córdoba	23 - 10	Rosario
27 March	Cuyo	-	Tucumán	14 - 58	Mendoza
27 March	Mar del Plata	-	Buenos Aires	39 - 20	Mar del Plata

5.Round
3 April	Córdoba	-	Buenos Aires	28 - 42	Mendoza
3 April	Tucumán	-	Rosaio	40 - 21	Tucumán
3 April	Mar del Plata	-	Cuyo	16 - 27	Córdoba

Pos	Team	Pld	W	D	L	PF	PA	PD	Pts	
1	Buenos Aires	5	5	0	0	292	80	+212	10	Champion
2	Tucumàn	5	4	0	1	184	80	+104	8	
3	Rosario	5	3	0	2	161	126	+35	6	
4	Cordoba	5	2	0	3	118	137	−19	4	
5	Cuyo	5	1	0	4	86	244	−158	2	
6	Mar del Plata	5	0	0	5	82	256	−174	0	

== "Ascenso" ==
Pos	Team	Pld	W	D	L	PF	PA	PD	Pts	Promotion	S-J	SFE	E-R	A-V	SUR	NOE
1	San Juan	5	4	1	0	169	109	+60	9	Promoted		26–26	23–16	52–19	19–16	49–32
2	Santa Fè	5	3	1	1	147	108	+39	7	Promoted	26–26		25–21	33–20	16–19	47–22
3	Entre Rios	5	3	0	2	92	69	+23	6		16–23	21–25		19–3	12–6	24–12
4	Alto Valle	5	2	0	3	103	149	−46	4		19–52	20–33	3–19		29–25	32–20
5	Sur	5	2	0	3	100	109	−9	4		16–19	19–16	6–12	25–29		34–33
6	Noroeste	5	0	0	5	119	186	−67	0		32–49	22–47	12–24	20–32	33–34	

== "Promocional" ==
=== Zone North ===
- Pool 1 (withdraw of Samtiago)

Pos	Team	Pld	W	D	L	PF	PA	PD	Pts	Qualification	MIS	FOR	STG
1	Misiones	2	2	0	0	13	10	+3	4	Qualified for Zone final		13–10	N.D.
2	Formosa	2	1	0	1	10	13	−3	2		10–13		N.D.
3	Santiago	2	0	0	2	0	0	0	0		0–ND	0–ND	

- Pool 2

Pos	Team	Pld	W	D	L	PF	PA	PD	Pts	Qualification	SAL	RIJ	JUJ
1	Salta	2	2	0	0	165	5	+160	4	Qualified for Zone final		76–5	89–0
2	La Rioja	2	1	0	1	23	79	−56	2		5–76		18–3
3	Jujuy	2	0	0	2	3	107	−104	0		0–89	3–18	

- Zone Final

1 May 1999

Misiones	6-73	Salta

=== Zone South ===
Pos	Team	Pld	W	D	L	PF	PA	PD	Pts	Qualification	CHU	AUS	OES
1	Chubut	2	2	0	0	77	7	+70	4	Qualified for Final		29–0	48–7
2	Austral	2	1	0	1	39	46	−7	2		0–29		39–17
3	Oeste	2	0	0	2	24	87	−63	0		7–48	17–39	

=== Final ===
22 May 1999

Chubut	12-20	Salta

Because of the restructuring of the championship, both teams were promoted.
