= 1994 Campeonato Argentino de Rugby =

Rugby union competition season

50° Campeonato Argentino
- Champions: Buenos Aires (25th title)
- Runners-up: Cordoba
- Relegated: Santa Fè and Salta

The 1994 Campeonato Argentino de Rugby was won by the selection of Buenos Aires that beat in the final the selection of Cordoba. The 21 teams participating, were divide in three levels : "Campeonato" (assigning the title), "Ascenso", "Clasificacion".

== Rugby Union in Argentina in 1994 ==
=== National ===
- The "Campeonato Argentino Menores de 21" (Under 21 championship) was won by Buenos Aires
- The "Campeonato Juvenil" (Under 19 championship) was won by Cordoba
- The "National Championship for clubs" was won by San Isidro Club, beating in the final La Tablada
- The "Torneo de la URBA" (Buenos Aires) was won by San Isidro Club
- The "Cordoba Province Championship" was won by La Tablada
- The North-East Championship was won by Los Tarcos

=== International ===
- Argentina, beating United States, obtained the qualification to 1995 Rugby World Cup
- Scotland visit Argentina. Pumas won both test match against "Pumas" (16-15), (19-27)
- Argentina visit South Africa, losing both tests against "Springboks"
- Queensland Reds, visited Argentina playing six match against provincial selections.

== "Campeonato" ==
The better eight teams played for title. They were divided in tow pools of four, the first two each pools admitted to semifinals, the last relegated in second division

=== Pool "A" ===
Pos	Team	Pld	W	D	L	PF	PA	PD	Pts	Qualification or relegation	CBA	TUC	CUY	SFE
1	Cordoba	3	3	0	0	125	64	+61	6	Qualified for Semifinals		27–22	39–29	59–13
2	Tucumàn	3	2	0	1	110	69	+41	4	Qualified for Semifinals	22–27		32–13	56–29
3	Cuyo	3	1	0	2	70	91	−21	2		29–39	13–32		28–20
4	Santa Fè	3	0	0	3	62	143	−81	0	Relegated	13–59	29–56	20–28	

=== Pool "B" ===
Pos	Team	Pld	W	D	L	PF	PA	PD	Pts	Qualification or relegation	B.A.	ROS	S-J	SAL
1	Buenos Aires	3	2	1	0	201	57	+144	5	Qualified for Semifinals		25–25	69–19	107–16
2	Rosario	3	2	1	0	160	43	+117	5	Qualified for Semifinals	25–25		23–12	112–6
3	San Juan	3	1	0	2	50	112	−62	2		16–69	12–23		22–20
4	Salta	3	0	0	3	42	241	−199	0	Relegated	16–107	6–112	20–22	

=== Semifinals ===
6 May 1994

Buenos Aires	v	Tucumàn

El Coloso Rosario
Referee: Stuart Piercey (England)

8 May 1994

Rosario	23-25	Cordoba

El Coloso Rosario
Referee: Kevin Ricketts (England)

=== Final ===
9 May 1994

Buenos Aires	22-13	Cordoba

C.A. Rosario, Rosario
Referee: Stuart Piercey (England)

== "Ascenso" ==
=== Pool A ===
Pos	Team	Pld	W	D	L	PF	PA	PD	Pts	Promotion or relegation	NOE	STG	ER	CUE
1	Noroeste	3	3	0	0	150	31	+119	6	Promoted		39–3	28–20	83–8
2	Santiago	3	2	0	1	61	76	−15	4		3–39		25–13	33–24
3	Entre Rios	3	1	0	2	128	53	+75	2		20–28	13–25		95–0
4	Cuenca del Salado	3	0	0	3	32	211	−179	0	Relegated	8–83	24–33	0–95	

=== Pool B ===
Pos	Team	Pld	W	D	L	PF	PA	PD	Pts	Promotion or relegation	MdP	SUR	A-V	AUS
1	Mar del Plata	3	3	0	0	142	20	+122	6	Promoted		26–12	38–5	78–3
2	Sur	3	2	0	1	99	47	+52	4		12–26		23–13	64–8
3	Alta Valle	3	1	0	2	53	78	−25	2		5–38	13–23		35–17
4	Austral	3	0	0	3	28	177	−149	0	Relegated	3–78	8–64	17–35	

== "Classification" ==
=== Pool A ===
Pos	Team	Pld	W	D	L	PF	PA	PD	Pts	Promotion	MIS	FOR	JUJ
1	Misiones	1	1	0	0	31	10	+21	2	Promoted		31–10	–
2	Formosa	1	0	0	1	10	31	−21	0		10–31		–
3	Jujuy	0	0	0	0	0	0	0	0	Forfeit	–	–	

Promoted: Misiones

=== Pool B ===
Pos	Team	Pld	W	D	L	PF	PA	PD	Pts	Promotion	CEN	CHU	OES
1	Centro	2	2	0	0	82	23	+59	4	Promoted		22–17	60–6
2	Chubut	2	1	0	1	39	41	−2	2		17–22		22–19
3	Oeste	2	0	0	2	25	82	−57	0		6–60	19–22	

Promoted: Centro
