= 1998 Campeonato Argentino de Rugby =

Rugby union competition season

54º Campeonato Argentino
- Champions: Buenos Aires (27th title)
- Runners-up: Cordoba

The 1998 Campeonato Argentino de Rugby was won by the selection of Unione of Buenos Aires

The 22 teams participating were divided on three levels: "Campeonato", "Ascenso", "Promocional".

== Rugby Union in Argentina in 1998 ==
=== National ===
- The "Campeonato Argentino Menores de 21" (Under 21 championship) was won by Buenos Aires
- The "Campeonato Argentino Menores de 19" (Under 19 championship) was won by Tucumán
- The "National Championship for clubs" was won by Jockey Club de Rosario
- The first edition of Torneo del Interior (tournament with club outside Buenos Aires) was won by Jockey Club Córdoba
- The "Torneo de la URBA" (Buenos Aires) was won by Hindú
- The "Cordoba Province Championship" was won by Tala
- The North-East Championship was won by Universitario de Tucumán

=== International ===
- Winning the third edition of Pan American Championship, the "Pumas" conquest the qualification for 1999 Rugby World Cup
- In JuneFrance visit Argentina, and won both test with "Pumas" (35-18 and 37-12)
- In August, is Romania to visit Argentina, for a five match tour, The test is won by Pumas 68-22
- Argentina national team, in September visit Japan for a short tour (two matches). With an experimental team. lost the test match against Japan national team (29-44). In November, The Pumas visit Europe. Played six match, with three losses with Italy, France and Wales in the test match.
- In October, Argentina, won as usual the 1998 South American Rugby Championship

== "Campeonato" ==
1ª round
7 March	Cordoba	-	Rosario	36-37	Cordoba
7 March	Tucumàn	-	Cuyo	41-7	S.Miguel de T.
7 March	Buenos Aires	-	Noreste	129-0	Buenos Aires

2ª round
14 March	Noreste	-	Rosario	13-56	Resistencia
14 March	Cuyo	-	Buenos Aires	12-62	Mendoza
14 March	Cordoba	-	Tucumàn	42-38	Cordoba

3ª round
21 March	Rosario	-	Cuyo	41-21	Rosario
21 March	Tucumàn	-	Buenos Aires	13-27	S.Miguel de T.
21 March	Noreste	-	Cordoba	25-43	Resistencia

4ª round
28 March	Cordoba	-	Cuyo	41-3	Cordoba
28 March	Buenos Aires	-	Rosario	54-31	Buenos Aires
28 March	Tucumàn	-	Noreste	61-10	S.Miguel de T.

5ª round
4 April	Buenos Aires	-	Cordoba	41-23	Buenos Aires
4 April	Rosario	-	Tucumàn	46-30	Rosario
4 April	Cuyo	-	Noreste	26-9	Mendoza

Champion
Relegated to "Ascenso"

Place	Team	Games				Points			Table points
Place	Team	played	won	drawn	lost	for	against	diff.	Table points
1	Buenos Aires	5	5	0	0	313	85	228	10
2	Cordoba	5	4	0	1	189	142	47	8
3	Rosario	5	3	0	2	211	154	57	6
4	Tucumàn	5	2	0	3	190	132	58	4
5	Cuyo	5	1	0	4	73	194	-121	2
6	Noroeste	5	0	0	5	55	324	-269	0

== "Ascenso" ==
	MdP	E-R	SFE	A-V	S-J	SAL
Mar del Plata	––––	34-21	35-36	27-16	48-30	22-10
Entre Rios	21-34	––––	24-18	23-26	31-22	26-13
Santa Fè	36-35	18-24	––––	55-19	19-20	29-26
Alto Valle	16-27	26-23	19-55	––––	37-36	14-33
San Juan	30-48	22-31	20-19	36-37	––––	38-33
Salta	10-22	13-26	26-29	33-14	33-38	––––

Promoted to "Campeonato"
Relegated to "Promocional"

Place	Team	Games				Points			Table points
Place	Team	played	won	drawn	lost	for	against	diff.	Table points
1	Mar del Plata	5	4	0	1	166	113	53	8
2	Entre Rios	5	3	0	2	125	113	12	6
3	Santa Fè	5	3	0	2	157	124	33	6
4	Alto Valle	5	2	0	3	112	174	-62	4
5	San Juan	5	2	0	3	146	168	-22	4
6	Salta	5	1	0	4	115	129	-14	2

Promossa: Mar del Plata , Retrocede: Salta

== Promocional ==
=== Pool A ===
	SUR	CHU	AUS	OES	CEN
Sur	––––	35-15	39-6	42-7	77-6
Chubut	15-35	––––	20-15	38-10	N.D.
Austral	6-39	15-20	––––	20-12	26-6
Oeste	7-42	10-38	12-20	––––	38-23
Centro	6-77	N.D.	6-26	23-38	––––

Qualified for final

Place	Team	Games				Points			Table points
Place	Team	played	won	drawn	lost	for	against	diff.	Table points
1	Sur	4	4	0	0	193	34	159	8
2	Chubut	3	2	0	1	73	60	13	4
3	Austral	3	2	0	1	67	77	-10	4
4	Oeste	4	1	0	3	67	123	-56	4
5	Centro	4	1	0	3	35	141	-106	4

=== Pool B ===
	MIS	RIJ	STG	JUJ	FOR
Misiones	––––	26-25	24-20	28-20	38-7
La Rioja	25-26	––––	29-16	12-3	24-7
Santiago	20-24	16-29	––––	37-21	28-22
Jujuy	20-28	3-12	21-37	––––	15-14
Formosa	7-38	7-24	22-28	14-15	––––

Qualified for final

Place	Team	Games				Points			Table points
Place	Team	played	won	drawn	lost	for	against	diff.	Table points
1	Misiones	4	4	0	0	116	72	44	8
2	La Rioja	4	3	0	1	90	52	38	6
3	Santiago	4	2	0	2	101	96	5	4
4	Jujuy	4	1	0	3	59	91	-32	2
5	Formosa	4	0	0	4	50	105	-55	0

=== Final ===
2 May 1988

Sur	47-24	Misiones

- Sur promoted to "Ascenso"
