= 1991 Campeonato Argentino de Rugby =

42nd Campeonato Argentino de Mayores
- Number of teams: 19
- Champions: Buenos Aires
- Runners-up: Rosario.
- Relegated: Mar del Plata and Misiones

The 1991 Campeonato Argentino de Rugby was won by the selection of Buenos Aires that beat in the final the selection of Rosario.

== Rugby union in Argentina in 1991 ==
=== National ===
- The Buenos Aires Championship was won by Alumni
- The Cordoba Province Championship was won by La Tablada
- The North-East Championship was won by Tucumán RC

=== International ===
- In order to prepare the 1991 Rugby World Cup Argentina, host the la New Zealand team in tour. Both test-match was easily won by All Blacks (14–28) and (6-36), that won all the matches against provincial selection.
- At the 1991 Rugby World Cup, Argentina lost al the matches against Wales, Samoa and Australia.
- Few days before the Rugby World Cup, Argentina won, with the second line players, the South American Championship.

== "Campeonato" Tournament ==
The better eight teams played for title. They were divided in two pools of four, the first two each pools admitted to semifinals, the last relegated in secondo division Pool A.

=== Pool A ===
Pos	Team	Pld	W	D	L	PF	PA	PD	Pts	Qualification or relegation	B-A	ROS	TUC	MIS
1	Buenos Aires	3	3	0	0	152	28	+124	6	Qualified for Semifinals		36–12	35–6	81–10
2	Rosario	3	2	0	1	120	57	+63	4	Qualified for Semifinals	12–36		30–18	78–3
3	Tucumàn	3	1	0	2	103	69	+34	2		6–35	18–30		79–4
4	Misiones	3	0	0	3	17	238	−221	0	Relegated	10–81	3–78	4–79	

=== Pool B ===
Pos	Team	Pld	W	D	L	PF	PA	PD	Pts	Qualification or relegation	CUY	CBA	S-J	MdP
1	Cuyo	3	3	0	0	90	32	+58	6	Qualified for Semifinals		13–7	27–19	50–6
2	Córdoba	3	2	0	1	69	28	+41	4	Qualified for Semifinals	7–13		35–6	27–9
3	San Juan	3	1	0	2	48	80	−32	2		19–27	6–35		23–18
4	Mar del Plata	3	0	0	3	33	100	−67	0	Relegated	6–50	9–27	18–23	

=== Semifinals ===
2 November 1991

Buenos Aires	37-12	Córdoba

Paturuzu RC, Trelew

2 November 1991

Rosario	27-17	Cuyo

Paturuzu RC, Trelew

=== 3rd place final ===
3 November 1991

Córdoba	26-14	Cuyo

Paturuzu RC, Trelew

=== Final ===
3 November 1991

Buenos Aires	28-16	Rosario

Paturuzu RC, Trelew

- Champions: Tucumán
- Relegated : Mar del Plata and Misiones

== Torneo "Ascenso" ==
Eight team divided in two pools, the winner of each promoted, the last relegated

=== Pool "A" ===
Pos	Team	Pld	W	D	L	PF	PA	PD	Pts	Promotion or relegation	SFE	NOE	SAL	STG
1	Santa Fè	3	3	0	0	87	30	+57	6	Promoted		16–12	26–6	45–12
2	Noreste	3	2	0	1	56	35	+21	4		12–16		28–6	16–13
3	Salta	3	1	0	2	31	71	−40	2		6–26	6–28		19–17
4	Santiago del estero	3	0	0	3	42	80	−38	0	Relegated	12–45	13–16	17–19	

Promoted: Santa Fè Relegated: Santiago del estero

=== Pool B ===
Pos	Team	Pld	W	D	L	PF	PA	PD	Pts	Promotion or relegation	E-R	A-V	SUR	OES
1	Entre Rios	3	3	0	0	99	21	+78	6	Promoted		17–9	26–6	56–6
2	Alto Valle	3	2	0	1	65	21	+44	4		9–17		19–4	37–0
3	Sur	3	1	0	2	39	51	−12	2		6–26	4–19		29–6
4	Oeste	3	0	0	3	12	122	−110	0	Relegated	6–56	0–37	6–29	

Promoted: Entre Rios Relegated: Oeste

== Torneo "Clasificacion" ==
Was played for the first time a "Third level" tournament, with a promotion in "Ascenso"

=== Pool A ===
The tournament was cancelled

=== Pool B ===
Pos	Team	Pld	W	D	L	PF	PA	PD	Pts	Promotion	CEN	AUS	CHU
1	Centro	2	1	1	0	30	15	+15	3	Promoted		12–12	18–3
2	Austral	2	1	1	0	24	22	+2	3		12–12		12–10
3	Chubut	2	0	0	2	13	30	−17	0		3–18	10–12	

Promoted: Centro
