= 2000 Campeonato Argentino de Rugby =

Rugby union competition season

56° Campeonato Argentino
- Champions: Buenos Aires (29th title)
- Runners-up: Tucumàn
- Relegated: Santa Fè and San Juan

The Campeonato Argentino de Rugby 2000 was won by the selection Buenos Aires that beat in the final the selection of Tucumàn

The 21 teams participating were divided on three levels: "Campeonato", "Ascenso", "Promocional".

== Rugby Union in Argentina in 2000 ==
=== National ===
- The Buenos Aires Championship was won by Atlético del Rosario
- The Cordoba Province Championship was won by La Tablada
- The North-East Championship was won by Tucumán RC

=== International ===
- In June Argentina beat Ireland in a test played in Buenos Aires.
- After, always in June, "the Pumas", visit for a four match tour. The lost both test matches (6-53 e 25–32). In November they played two matches in England, with a heavy loss against England
- Before the tour in England, Argentina hosted South Africa, losing the match 33–37.
- An "Argentina Development XV" won the South American Championship played in Montevideo

== "Campeonato" ==
Two pools of 4 teams. The top two to the semi-finals, third and fourth to the relegation play-out.

=== Pool A ===
1. Round
7 October	Buenos Aires	70–7	Santa Fe	Buenos Aires
7 October	Rosario	30–11	San Juan	Rosario

2. Round
14 October	Rosario	49–28	Santa Fe	Rosario
14 October	San Juan	18–49	Buenos Aires	San Juan

3. Round
21 October	Buenos Aires	76–20	Rosario	Buenos Aires
21 October	Santa Fe	9–20	San Juan	Buenos Aires

Standings

to semi-finals
to play-out

Place	Team	Games				Points			Table points
Place	Team	Played	Won	Drawn	Lost	For	Against	Diff.	Table points
1	Buenos Aires	3	3	0	0	195	45	150	6
2	Rosario	3	2	0	1	99	115	−16	4
3	San Juan	3	1	0	2	49	88	−39	2
4	Santa Fè	3	0	0	3	44	139	−95	0

=== Pool B ===
1. Round
7 October	Tucumán	43–23	Mar del Plata	Tucumán
7 October	Córdoba	44–10	Cuyo	Córdoba

2. Round
14 October	Córdoba	33–38	Mar del Plata	Córdoba
14 October	Cuyo	25–32	Tucumán	San Juan

3. Round
21 October	Tucumán	32–21	Córdoba	Tucumán
21 October	Mar del Plata	6–16	Cuyo	Mar del Plata

Standings

to semi-finals
to play-out

Place	Team	Games				Points			Table points
Place	Team	Played	Won	Drawn	Lost	For	Against	Diff.	Table points
1	Tucumàn	3	3	0	0	96	69	27	6
2	Cordoba	3	1	0	2	98	80	18	2
3	Mar del Plata	3	1	0	2	67	81	−14	2
4	Cuyo	3	1	0	2	51	82	−31	2

=== Semi-finals ===
Semi-finals
28 October	Tucumán	38–35	Rosario	Tucumán
28 October	Buenos Aires	43–21	Córdoba	Buenos Aires

=== Final ===
Final
4 November	Tucumán	16–35	Buenos Aires	Tucumán

=== Play-out ===
Play-out
28 October	San Juan	24–27	Cuyo	San Juan
28 October	Mar del Plata	44–12	Santa Fe	Mar del Plata

- Relegated: Santa Fè and San Juan

== "Ascenso" ==
1. Round
30 September	Alto Valle	9–19	Chubut	Neuquen
30 September	Sur	6–41	Noreste	Bahía Blanca
30 September	Entre Rios	5–26	Salta	Paraná

2. Round
7 October	Chubut	21–18	Sur
7 October	Alto Valle	36–16	Entre Rios	Neuquen
7 October	Salta	25–6	Noreste	Salta

3. Round
14 October	Chubut	34–27	Entre Rios
14 October	Sur	29–24	Salta	Bahía Blanca
14 October	Noreste	28–20	Alto Valle

4. Round
21 October	Entre Rios	31–31	Noreste	Paraná
21 October	Sur	36–33	Alto Valle	Bahía Blanca
21 October	Salta	67–8	Chubut	Salta

5. Round
28 October	Alto Valle	17–18	Salta	Neuquen
28 October	Noreste	5–12	Chubut
28 October	Entre Rios	48–35	Sur	Córdoba

Standings

Promoted to "Campeonato"

Place	Team	Games				Points			Table points
Place	Team	Played	Won	Drawn	Lost	For	Against	Diff.	Table points
1	Salta	5	4	1	0	160	55	105	9
2	Chubut	5	3	1	1	94	126	−32	7
3	Sur	5	2	0	3	134	122	12	4
4	Entre Rios	5	2	1	2	114	175	−61	5
5	Noreste	5	2	1	2	79	101	−22	5
6	Alto Valle	5	1	0	4	115	117	−2	2

== "Promocional" ==
=== Pool A ===
1. Round
7 October	Austral	32–0	Oeste	Comodoro Rivadavia
7 October	Centro	23–27	La Rioja

2. Round
14 October	Centro	6–19	Oeste
14 October	La Rioja	16–10	Austral	La Rioja

3. Round
21 October	Austral	17–10	Centro	Comodoro Rivadavia
21 October	Oeste	11–7	La Rioja

Promoted to "Ascenso"
to play-out

Place	Team	Games				Points			Table points
Place	Team	Played	Won	Drawn	Lost	For	Against	Diff.	Table points
1	Austral	3	2	0	1	59	26	33	4
2	Oeste	3	2	0	1	30	45	−15	4
3	La Rioja	3	2	0	1	47	44	3	4
4	Centro	3	0	0	3	39	60	−21	0

=== Pool B ===
1. Round
7 October	Misiones	20–35	Santiago del Estero	Misiones
7 October	Formosa	57–7	Jujuy

2. Round
14 October	Formosa	3–35	Santiago del Estero
14 October	Jujuy	10–15	Misiones	Jujuy

3. Round
21 October	Misiones	40–30	Formosa	Misiones
21 October	Santiago del Estero	107–7	Jujuy	Santiago del Estero

Standings

Promoted to "Ascenso"
to play-out

Place	Team	Games				Points			Table points
Place	Team	Played	Won	Drawn	Lost	For	Against	Diff.	Table points
1	Santiago del Estero	3	2	0	1	174	30	144	4
2	Misiones	3	2	0	1	75	75	0	4
3	Formosa	3	2	0	1	90	82	8	4
4	Jujuy	3	0	0	3	24	176	−152	0
