= 1986 Campeonato Argentino de Rugby =

42° Campeonato Argentino de Mayores
- Countries: Argentina
- Number of teams: 18
- Champions: Buenos Aires (23rd title)
- Runners-up: Unión de Rugby de Tucumàn

The Campeonato Argentino de Rugby 1986 was won by the selection of Buenos Aires that beat in the final the selection of Unión de Rugby de Tucumàn

== Rugby Union in Argentina in 1986 ==
=== National ===
- The Buenos Aires Championship was won by San Isidro Club and Banco Nacion
- The Cordoba Province Championship was won by Tala
- The North-East Championship was won by Los Tarcos
- The selection of Tucumàn won the "Campionato juvenil". It was a great moment for the rugby of Tucuman that ended the domination of Buenos Aires selection.

=== International ===
- The "Pumas" won against France in the First test in Buenos Aires, ma loss the second.
- The Argentine national team go to Australia, were loss two test matches

== Preliminaries ==
Santa Fè Admitted directly to semifinals, as host of "final-four".

=== Zone 1 ===
1st round
11 October	Alto Valle	-	Mar del Plata	9 - 28
11 October	Cuyo	-	Austral	3 - 0	(withdraw)

Final
12 October	Mar del Plata	-	Cuyo	24 - 25

=== Zone B ===
1st round
11 October	Córdoba	-	Chubut	102 - 3
11 October	Buenos Airesa	-	Salta	84 - 13

Final
12 October	Córdoba	-	Buenos Aires	6 - 43

=== Zone C ===
1st round
4 October	Noroeste	-	Misiones	28 - 13
4 October	Tucumán	-	Entre Rios	31 - 20

Final
5 October	Tucumán	-	Noreste	-

=== Zone D ===
PRELIMINARY
27 sept.	Jujuy	-	Santiago del estero	32 - 18

1st round
4 October	Rosario	-	Santiago del estero	37 - 30
4 October	San Juan	-	Sur	15 - 31

Final
5 October	Rosario	-	Sur	46 - 10

=== Interzone C-D ===
QUARTERS OF FINALS
12 October	Tucumán	-	Rosario	32 - 12	Gymnasia y Esgrima,

== Semifinals ==
18 October 1986

Santa Fè	13-20	Tucumàn

Gymnasia y Esgrima, Santa Fè
Referee: Enrique Cazenave (B.Aires)

18 October 1986

Cuyo	13-31	Buenos Aires

Gymnasia y Esgrima, Santa Fe
Referee: Jose Pablo Giallongo (Mar del Plata)

== Third place final ==
19 October 1986

Santa Fè	28-12	Cuyo

Gymnasia y Esgrima, Santa Fe
Referee: Enrique Cazenave (B.Aires)

== Final ==
19 October 1986

Buenos Aires	24-15	Tucumàn
Try: Annichini; Con: Porta; Pen: Porta 6		Pen: Sauze 5

Gymnasia y Esgrima, Santa Fe
Referee: Jose Pablo Giallongo (Mar del Plata)

Buenos Aires: 15.Rafael Madero, 14.Ricardo Annichini, 13. Fabian Turners, 12.Diego Cuesta Silva, 11. Juan Lanza, 10.Hugo Porta (cap.), 9. Martín Yanguela, 8.Jorge Allen, 7.Alejandro Schiavio, 6.Pablo Franchi, 5.Eliseo Branca, 4.Sergio Carossio, 3.Eduardo Valesani, 2. Diego Cash, 1.Fernando Morel.
Tucuman: 15.Juan Soler, 14.Marcos Silvetti, 13.José Gianoti, 12.Julio Williams, 11.Gabriel Terán, 10.Ricardo Sauze, 9.Pedro Merlo, 8.Pablo Garretón, 7.Marcelo Ricci (cap.) 6.>Gabriel Palou, 5.Sergio Bunader, 4.Pablo Buabse, 3.Luis Molina, 2.Ricardo Le Fort, 1.Julio Coria.
