= 2007 Campeonato Argentino de Rugby =

63° Campeonato Argentino
- Number of teams: 24
- Champions: Buenos Aires (29th title)
- Runners-up: Unión de Rugby de Tucumàn
- Relegated: San Juan

The 2007 Campeonato Argentino de Rugby was won by the selection of the U.R.B.A. (Buenos Aires) that beat in the final the selection of Unión de Rugby de Tucumàn The 24 teams participating were divided in two levels : "Campeonato" (8 teams), "Ascenso", (16 teams, divided in four pools)

== "Campeonato" ==
Team participating divided in due pools of 4. The first two of each pool admitted to semifinals, the last to play-out for relegation ("Finale descenso")

=== Pool 1 ===
1.Round
3 March	Buenos Aires	-	Rosario	26 - 6	Buenos Aires
3 March	Córdoba	-	San Juan	10 - 7	Córdoba

2.Round
10 March	San Juan	-	Buenos Aires	7 - 49	San Juan
10 March	Córdoba	-	Rosario	30 - 3	Córdoba

3.Round
17 March	Buenos Aires	-	Córdoba	60 - 15	Buenos Aires
17 March	Rosario	-	San Juan	20 - 12	Rosario

Qualified for Semifinals
to relegation play-out

Place	Team	Games				Points			Table points
Place	Team	played	won	drawn	lost	for	against	diff.	Table points
1	Buenos Aires	3	3	0	0	135	28	107	6
2	Córdoba	3	2	0	1	55	70	-15	4
3	Rosario	3	1	0	2	29	68	-39	2
4	San Juan	3	0	0	3	26	79	-53	0

=== Pool 2 ===
1.Round
3 March	Tucumán	-	Salta	18 - 13	Tucumán
3 March	Cuyo	-	Santa Fe	27 - 28	Mendoza

2.Round
10 March	Santa Fe	-	Tucumán	18 - 23	Santa Fe
10 March	Cuyo	-	Santa Fe	28 - 12	Mendoza

3.Round
17 March	Tucumán	-	Cuyo	31 - 0	Tucumán
17 March	Salta	-	Santa Fe	15 - 14	Rosario

3.Round
17 October	Tucumán	-	Cuyo	31 - 0	Tucumán
17 October	Salta	-	Santa Fe	15 - 14	Rosario

Qualified for Semifinals
to relegation play-out

Place	Team	Games				Points			Table points
Place	Team	played	won	drawn	lost	for	against	diff.	Table points
1	Tucumàn	3	3	0	0	72	31	41	6
2	Santa Fè	3	1	0	2	60	65	-5	2
3	Cuyo	3	1	0	2	55	71	-16	2
4	Salta	3	1	0	2	40	60	-20	2

=== Play-offs (Title) ===
Semifinals
24 March	Buenos Aires	-	Santa Fe	63 - 12	Buenos Aires
24 March	Tucumán	-	Córdoba	20 - 9	Tucumán

Finale
31 March	Tucumán	-	Buenos Aires	10 - 27	Tucumán

=== Play Out (relegation) ===
Pay Out ("Finale Descenso")
24 March	San Juan	-	Salta	22 - 23	San Juan
31 March	Salta	-	San Juan	33 - 17	Santa Fe

- Relegated: San Juan

== "Torneo Ascenso" ==
16 teams, divided in 4 pools. Le winner of each pool to the semifinals

=== Pool "Norte 1" ===
1.Round
3 March	Santiago del estero	-	La Rijoa	29 - 7	Santiago de l'Estero
3 March	San Luis	-	Jujuy	26 - 17	San Luis

2.Round
10 March	Jujuy	-	Santiago del estero	5 - 26	San Salvador de Jujuy
10 March	San Luis	-	La Rijoa	8 - 8	San Luis

3.Round
17 March	Santiago del estero	-	San Luis	43 - 0	Santiago de l'Estero
17 March	La Rioja	-	Jujuy	17 - 14	La Rioja

- Ranking:

Qualified for Semifinals

Place	Team	Games				Points			Table points
Place	Team	played	won	drawn	lost	for	against	diff.	Table points
1	Santiago de l'Estero	3	3	0	0	98	12	86	6
2	La Rioja	3	1	1	1	32	51	-19	3
3	San Luis	3	1	1	1	34	68	-34	3
4	Jujuy	3	0	0	3	36	69	-33	0

=== Pool "Norte 2" ===
1.Round
3 March	Noreste	-	Misiones	15 - 8	Resistencia
3 March	Entre Rios	-	Formosa	27 - 28	Paraná

2.Round
10 March	Formosa	-	Noreste	5 - 94	Formosa
10 March	Entre Rios	-	Misiones	31 - 13	Paraná

3.Round
17 March	Noreste	-	Entre Rios	14 - 3	Resistencia
17 March	Misiones	-	Formosa	133 - 0	Rosario

Qualified for Semifinals

Place	Team	Games				Points			Table points
Place	Team	played	won	drawn	lost	for	against	diff.	Table points
1	Noreste	3	3	0	0	123	16	107	6
2	Entre Rios	3	2	0	1	96	27	69	4
3	Misiones	3	1	0	2	154	46	108	2
4	Formosa	3	0	0	3	5	289	-284	0

=== Pool "Sur 1" ===
1.Round
14 April	Mar del Plata	-	Alto Valle	56 - 0	Mar del Plata
14 April	Sur	-	Oeste	67 - 13	Bahía Blanca

2.Round
21 April	Oeste	-	Mar del Plata	3 - 62	Junín
21 April	Sur	-	Alto Valle	24 - 0	Bahía Blanca

3.Round
28 April	Mar del Plata	-	Sur	12 - 12	Mar del Plata
28 April	Alto Valle	-	Oeste	62 - 7	Neuquén

Qualified for Semifinals

Place	Team	Games				Points			Table points
Place	Team	played	won	drawn	lost	for	against	diff.	Table points
1	Mar del Plata	3	2	1	0	130	15	115	5
2	Sur	3	2	1	0	103	15	88	5
3	Alto Valle	3	1	0	2	62	87	-25	2
4	Oeste	3	0	0	3	13	191	-178	0

=== Pool "Sur 2" ===
1.Round
24 March	Lagos del Sur	-	Chubut	9 - 35	Bariloche
4 April	Austral	-	Lagos del Sur	27 - 28	Comodoro Rivadavia
6 April	Tierra del Fuego	-	Lagos del Sur	0 - 78	Ushuaia
8 April	Austral	-	Tierra del Fuogo	28 - 25	Comodoro Rivadavia
14 April	Tierra del Fuego	-	Chubut	7 - 55	Ushuaia
21 April	Chubut	-	Austral	15 - 14	Trelew

Qualified for Semifinals

Place	Team	Games				Points			Table points
Place	Team	played	won	drawn	lost	for	against	diff.	Table points
1	Chubut	3	3	0	0	196	23	173	6
2	Lagos del Sur	3	2	0	1	106	47	59	4
3	Austral	3	1	0	2	47	150	-103	2
4	Tierra del Fuego	3	0	0	3	32	161	-129	0

=== Semifinals ===
Semifinals
24 March	Noreste	-	Santiago del estero	14 - 12	Resistencia
5 May	Chubut	-	Mar del Plata	3 - 41	Trelew

=== Final ===
Final
12 May	Noreste	-	Mar del Plata	18 - 12	Resistencia
19 May	Mar del Plata	-	Noreste	31 - 10	Mar del Plata

- Promoted: Mar del Plata
