= 2003 Campeonato Argentino de Rugby =

59° Campeonato Argentino de Mayores
- Champions: Buenos Aires. (3rd title)
- Runners-up: Rosario
- Relegated: Tucumán

== "Campeonato" ==
	B-A	ROS	TUC	CBA	CUY	MdP
Buenos Aires	––––	17-16	36-33	29-17	65-20	33-25
Rosario	16-17	––––	23-27	23-18	34-23	16-13
Cuyo	33-36	27-23	––––	18-24	13-24	29-19
Salta	17-29	18-23	24-18	––––	23-25	14-13
Cordoba	20-65	23-34	24-13	25-23	––––	24-30
Tucumàn	25-33	13-16	19-29	13-14	30-24	––––

Champions
Relegated

Place	Team	Games				Points			Table points
Place	Team	played	won	drawn	lost	for	against	diff.	Table points
1	Buenos Aires	5	5	0	0	180	111	69	10
2	Rosario	5	3	0	2	112	98	14	6
3	Cuyo	5	2	0	3	120	126	-6	4
4	Salta	5	2	0	3	96	108	-12	4
5	Cordoba	5	2	0	3	116	165	-49	4
6	Tucumàn	5	1	0	4	100	116	-16	2

== Ascenso ==
=== Pool 1 ===
	NOE	SJN	SFE	SdE
Noreste	––––	20-9	24-23	27-25
San Juan	9-20	––––	24-18	28-35
Santa Fe	23-24	18-24	––––	23-6
Santiago del Estero	25-27	35-28	6-23	––––

Qualified for Semifinals
Relegated

Place	Team	Games				Points			Table points
Place	Team	played	won	drawn	lost	for	against	diff.	Table points
1	Noreste	3	3	0	0	71	57	14	6
2	San Juan	3	1	0	2	61	73	-12	2
3	Santa Fe	3	1	0	2	64	54	10	2
4	Santiago del Estero	3	1	0	2	66	78	-12	2

=== Pool 2 ===
	MdP	SUR	AV	CHU
Mar del Plata	––––	28-22	22-19	12-3
Sur	22-28	––––	16-15	35-30
Alto Valle	19-22	15-16	––––	38-23
Chubut	3-12	30-35	23-38	––––

Qualified for Semifinals
Relegated

Place	Team	Games				Points			Table points
Place	Team	played	won	drawn	lost	for	against	diff.	Table points
1	Mar del Plata	3	3	0	0	62	44	18	6
2	Sur	3	2	0	1	73	73	0	4
3	Alto Valle	3	1	0	2	72	61	11	2
4	Chubut	3	0	0	3	56	85	-29	0

=== Semifinals ===
Semifinals
22 March	Mar Del Plata	-	Noreste	24 - 18
22 March	Noroeste	-	Sur	38 - 17

=== Final ===
1.Turno
29 March	Mar del Plata	-	Noroeste	16 - 23

- Mar del Plata Promoted to "Campeonato"

== "Estimulo" ==
=== Pool 1 ===
	ER	MIS	JUJ	FOR	LR
Entre Rios	––––	15-12	64-22	95-0	34-5
Misiones	12-15	––––	37-10	37-3	17-15
Jujuy	22-64	10-37	––––	26-12	20-3
Formosa	0-95	3-37	12-26	––––	42-12
La Rioja	5-34	15-17	3-20	12-42	––––

Promoted to "Ascenso"

Place	Team	Games				Points			Table points
Place	Team	played	won	drawn	lost	for	against	diff.	Table points
1	Entre Rios	4	4	0	0	208	39	169	8
2	Misiones	4	3	0	1	103	43	60	6
3	Jujuy	4	2	0	2	78	116	-38	4
4	Formosa	4	1	0	3	57	170	-113	2
5	La Rioja	4	0	0	4	35	113	-78	0

=== Pool 2 ===
- UR del Centro >(Tandil) withdrew after its merging with Mar del Plata.

	OES	AUS	TdF	CEN
Oeste	––––	24-23	31-5	24-18
Austral	23-24	––––	48-16	--
Tierra del Fuego	5-31	16-48	––––	--
UR del Centro	18-24	--	--	––––

érpmpted

Place	Team	Games				Points			Table points
Place	Team	played	won	drawn	lost	for	against	diff.	Table points
1	Oeste	3	3	0	0	79	46	33	6
2	Austral	2	1	0	1	71	40	31	2
3	Tierra del Fuego	2	0	0	2	21	79	-58	2
4	UR del Centro	1	0	0	2	18	24	-6	0
