= 1996 Campeonato Argentino de Rugby =

Rugby union competition season

52° Campeonato Argentino
- Champions: Buenos Aires and Cordoba
- Relegated: San Juan

The 1996 Campeonato Argentino de Rugby was won with a shared victory by the selection of Buenos Aires and Cordoba.

== Rugby Union in Argentina in 1996 ==
=== International ===
- In June, France toured Argentina, winning two test match against the "Pumas" and all the other match
- Before to visit Europe, South Africa toured Argentina. The Springboks played and won four match, four of them against "Pumas".
- In late November The "Pumas" toured England. The Pumas won all the match against regional selection and lost only against England "A" and the England first team
- "The Pumas" won the second edition of Pan American Championship

=== National ===
- The "Campeonato Argentino Menores de 21" (Under 21 championship) was won by Buenos Aires
- The "Campeonato Argentino Menores de 19" (Under 19 championship) victory was shared by Buenos Aires and Tucumàn
- The "National Championship for clubs" was won by Hindú
- The "Torneo de la URBA" (Buenos Aires) was won by Hindú and Atlético del Rosario
- The "Cordoba Province Championship" was won by Córdoba AC
- The North-East Championship was won by Natación y Gimnasia

== "Campeonato" ==
For the first time were played a single round robin with 6 teams

1ª giornata
6 April	Tucumàn - Cuyo	39-33
6 April	Cordoba - Rosario	37-12
6 April	Buenos Aires - San Juan	65-13

2ª giornata
13 April	San Juan - Rosario	20-23
13 April	Cuyo - Buenos Aires	28-24
13 April	Cordoba - Tucumàn	21-16

3ª giornata
20 April	Rosario - Cuyo	41-34
20 April	Tucumàn - Buenos Aires	15-16
20 April	San Juan - Cordoba	25-36

4ª giornata
27 April	Cordoba - Cuyo	59-24
27 April	Buenos Aires - Rosario	39-29
27 April	Tucumàn- San Juan	64-11

5ª giornata
1 May	Buenos Aires - Cordoba	27-15
1 May	Rosario - Tucumàn	29-30
1 May	Cuyo - San Juan	21-19

Place	Team	Games				Points			Table points
Place	Team	played	won	drawn	lost	for	against	diff.	Table points
1	Buenos Aires	5	4	0	1	171	100	71	8
1	Cordoba	5	4	0	1	155	110	45	8
3	Tucumàn	5	3	0	2	164	110	54	6
4	Cuyo	5	2	0	3	140	182	-42	4
4	Rosario	5	2	0	3	140	147	-7	4
6	San Juan	5	0	0	5	88	209	-121	0

Relegated: San Juan

== Zone "Ascenso" ==
- Results

	MdP	E-R	NOE	SFE	SAL	SUR
Mar del Plata	––––	18-17	29-30	47-27	20-17	36-9
Entre Rios	17-18	––––	17-15	30-22	33-31	32-17
Noroeste	30-29	15-17	––––	26-33	27-27	14-11
Santa Fè	27-47	22-30	33-26	––––	18-19	45-28
Salta	17-20	31-33	27-27	19-18	––––	47-48
Sur	9-36	17-32	11-14	28-45	48-47	––––

- Ranking Final

Promoted
Relegated

Place	Team	Games				Points			Table points
Place	Team	played	won	drawn	lost	for	against	diff.	Table points
1	Mar del Plata	5	4	0	1	150	100	50	8
2	Entre Rios	5	4	0	1	129	103	26	8
3	Noroeste	5	2	1	2	112	117	-5	5
4	Santa Fè	5	2	0	3	145	150	-5	4
5	Salta	5	1	1	3	141	146	-5	3
6	Sur	5	1	0	4	113	174	-61	2

Promoted: Mar del Plata
Relegated: Sur

== Zone "Promocional" ==
=== Pool A ===
	A V	AUS	CHU	CEN
Alto Valle	––––	35-8	40-23	118-0
Austral	8-35	––––	32-17	20-24
Chubut	23-40	17-32	––––	45-31
Centro	0-118	24-20	31-45	––––

Promoted

Place	Team	Games				Points			Table points
Place	Team	played	won	drawn	lost	for	against	diff.	Table points
1	Alto Valle	3	3	0	0	193	31	162	6
2	Austral	3	1	0	2	60	76	-16	2
3	Chubut	3	1	0	2	85	103	-18	2
4	Centro	3	1	0	2	55	183	-128	2

=== Pool B ===
The Pool B was not completed
