= 1983 Campeonato Argentino de Rugby =

39° Campeonato Argentino de Mayores
- Countries: Argentina
- Number of teams: 18
- Champions: Buenos Aires (20th title)
- Runners-up: Cuyo

The Campeonato Argentino de Rugby 1983 was an Argentine rugby competition in which Buenos Aires defeated Unión de Rugby de Cuyo for the championship.

== Rugby Union in Argentina in 1983 ==
=== National ===
- The Buenos Aires Championship was won by San Isidro Club
- The Cordoba Province Championship was won by Tala
- The North-East Championship was won by Los Tarcos

=== International ===
- The Argentine national team visited Australia and obtain an historical win in the first test
- As usual, Argentina won easily the "Campeonato Sudamericano "

=== Poule 1 ===
1st round
| 1 October | Noreste | - | Jujuy | 34 - 0 |
| 1 October | Tucumán | - | Misiones | 60 - 10 |

Finale 1. posto
| 2 October | Noreste | - | Tucumán | 0 - 32 |

=== Poule 2 ===
1st round
| 1 October | Córdoba | - | San Juan | 24 - 12 | Córdoba |
| 1 October | Santiago del estero | - | Salta | 19 - 27 | Córdoba |

Finale 1. posto
| 1 October | Córdoba | - | Salta | 57 - 4 | Córdoba |

=== Poule 3 ===
1st round
| 1 October | Entre Rios | - | Santa Fe | 21 - 9 | Paraná |
| 1 October | Mar del Plata | - | Rosario | 22 - 36 | Paraná |

Finale 1. posto
| 2 October | Entre Rios | - | Rosario | 9 - 24 | Paraná |

=== Poule 4 ===
PRELIMINARY
| 2 October | Austral | - | Chubut | 9 - 3 | Comodoro Rivadavia |

1st round
| 8 October | Buenos Aires | - | Alta Valle | 86 - 9 | Bahía Blanca |
| 8 October | Sur | - | Austral | 3 - 0 | (withdraw) |

Finale 1. posto
| 9 October | Sur | - | Buenos Aires | 9 - 56 | Bahía Blanca |

=== Interzone ===
INTERZONE
| 9 October | Tucumán | - | Córdoba | 25 - 6 | Tucumán |

== Semifinals ==
15 October 1983

| Buenos Aires | 46-16 | Rosario |

Referee: Manuel Peralta Ramírez (Córdoba)

15 October 1983

| Cuyo | 19-12 | Tucumàn |

Referee: Roberto Magnani (Buenos Aires)

== Third place final ==
16 October 1983

| Rosario | 29-34 | Tucumàn |

Referee: Roberto Magnani (Buenos Aires)

== Final ==
16 October 1983

| Cuyo | 3-52 | Buenos Aires |
| Pen: Chaluleu | | Try: Campo 2, Soares Gache 2, Courreges, Sansot Schiavio, Madero; Con: Porta 7 Pen: Porta 2 |

Referee: Manuel Peralta Ramírez (Córdoba)

Cuyo: 15.Luis Chaluleu (Guillermo Morgan), 14.Francisco Lola, 13. Carlos Cippittelli 12.Guillermo Carbonnell, 11.Alejandro González, 10.Jorge Curto, 9.Pedro Basile (cap.), 8.Gilberto Lago Suarez, 7.Sergio Elorga, 6.Luis Heyde, 5.Juan Floramo, 4.Alejandro Collado (Alberto Mantilla), 3.Fernando Rbello, 2.Mario Cichitti, 1.Alberto Gutierrez.
Buenos Aires: 15. Martín Sansot, 14.Marcelo Campo, 13. Rafael Madero, 12.Marcelo Loffreda, 11. José Maria Palma, 10 Hugo Porta (cap.), 9.Alfredo Soares Gache, 8. Tomas Petersen, 7.Alejandro Schiavio, 6. Marcos Baeck, 5.Gonzalo Gasso (Eduardo Laje), 4. Gabriel Travaglini, 3.Fernando Morel, 2.Andrés Courreges, 1. Pablo Devoto
