= 2006 Campeonato Argentino de Rugby =

62° Campeonato Argentino
- Number of teams: 24
- Champions: Buenos Aires (28th title)
- Runners-up: Tucumàn
- Relegated: Mar del Plata

The Campeonato Argentino de Rugby 2006 was won by the selection of the U.R.B.A. (Buenos Aires) that beat in the final the selection of Unión de Rugby de Tucumàn

The 23 teams participating were divided two levels : "Campeonato" (8 teams), "Ascenso", (15 teams, divided in two zone and five pools)

== "Campeonato" ==
The 8 teams divided in two pools of 4 teams. The first 2 to playoff. The fourth of each pools to the "finale descenso" (relegation final). The loser was relegated .

=== First phase ===
- Pool A

1.Round
4 March	Tucumán	-	Salta	42 - 12	Tucumán
4 March	Buenos Aires	-	Santa Fe	37 - 7	Buenos Aires

2.Round
11 March	Santa Fe	-	Tucumán	8 - 27	Santa Fe
11 March	Buenos Aires	-	Salta	43 - 13	Buenos Aires

3.Round
18 March	Tucumán	-	Buenos Aires	26 - 22	Tucumán
18 March	Salta	-	Santa Fe	34 - 30	Rosario

Qualified for Semifinals
to play-out ("descenso")

Place	Team	Games				Points			Table points
Place	Team	played	won	drawn	lost	for	against	diff.	Table points
1	Tucumàn	3	3	0	0	95	42	53	6
2	Buenos Aires	3	2	0	1	97	40	57	4
3	Salta	3	1	0	2	53	115	-62	2
4	Santa Fè	3	0	0	3	45	93	-48	0

- Pool B

1.Round
4 March	Cuyo	-	Rosario	16 - 16	Mendoza
4 March	Córdoba	-	Mar del Plata	16 - 9	Córdoba

2.Round
11 March	Mar del Plata	-	Cuyo	23 - 33	Mar del Plata
11 March	Córdoba	-	Rosario	51 - 16	Córdoba

3.Round
18 March	Cuyo	-	Córdoba	13 - 8	Mendoza
18 March	Rosario	-	Mar del Plata	30 - 10	Rosario

Qualified for Semifinals
to play-out ("descenso")

Place	Team	Games				Points			Table points
Place	Team	played	won	drawn	lost	for	against	diff.	Table points
1	Cuyo	3	2	1	0	62	47	15	5
2	Córdoba	3	2	0	1	75	38	37	4
3	Rosario	3	1	1	1	62	77	-15	3
4	Mar del Plata	3	0	0	3	42	79	-37	0

=== Play-offs ("Title") ===
Semifinals
25 March	Tucumán	-	Córdoba	40 - 26	Tucumán
25 March	Cuyo	-	Buenos Aires	15 - 49	Mendoza

Finals
1 April	Buenos Aires	-	Tucumán	34 - 10	Buenos Aires

=== Pay Out ("Descenso") ===
25 March	Mar del Plata	-	Santa Fe	26 - 25	Mar del Plata
1 April	Santa Fe	-	Mar del Plata	33 - 17	Santa Fe

- Mar del Plata relegated (lost on aggregate 43-58)

== "Ascenso" ==
15 teams divided in two geografic zones: "North" and "South". The final for promotion between the winner of each zone.

=== North Zone ===
Three pools of 3 teams. The first of each pool and the better second to semifinals-

==== First Phase ====
- POOL 1

1 July	La Rioja	-	San Juan	10 - 34
5 August	San Luis	-	La Rioja	26 - 22
2 September	San Juan	-	San Luis	78 - 10

Qualified for Zonal semifinals

Place	Team	Games				Points			Table points
Place	Team	played	won	drawn	lost	for	against	diff.	Table points
1	San Juan	2	2	0	0	112	20	92	4
2	San Luis	2	1	0	1	35	100	-65	2
3	La Rioja	2	0	0	2	32	59	-27	0

- POOL 2

1 July	Jujuy	-	Santiago del estero	10 - 25
5 August	Entre Rios	-	Jujuy	95 - 0
2 September	Santiago del estero	-	Entre Rios	24 - 19

Qualified for Zonal semifinals

Place	Team	Games				Points			Table points
Place	Team	played	won	drawn	lost	for	against	diff.	Table points
1	Santiago de l'Estero	2	2	0	0	49	29	20	4
2	Entre Rios	2	1	0	1	114	24	90	2
3	Jujuy	2	0	0	2	10	120	-110	0

- POOL 3

1 July	Misiones	-	Noreste	11 - 16
5 August	Formosa	-	Misiones	10 - 35
2 September	Noreste	-	Formosa	98 - 17

Qualified for Zonal semifinals

Place	Team	Games				Points			Table points
Place	Team	played	won	drawn	lost	for	against	diff.	Table points
1	Noreste	2	2	0	0	114	28	86	4
2	Misiones	2	1	0	1	46	34	12	2
3	Formosa	2	0	0	2	35	133	-98	0

==== Playoffs ====
Semifinals
14 October	San Juan	-	Entre Rios	37 - 25
14 October	Noreste	-	Santiago del estero	24 - 13

Final
21 October	Noreste	-	San Juan	11 - 25

=== South Zone ===
Two pools of three teams. The winner of each Pool progressed to the zonal final.

- POOL 1

5 August	Alto Valle	-	Oeste	39 - 3
2 September	Sur	-	Oeste	65 - 7
14 October	Alto Valle	-	Sur	17 - 20

Qualified for Zonal final

Place	Team	Games				Points			Table points
Place	Team	played	won	drawn	lost	for	against	diff.	Table points
1	Sur	2	2	0	0	85	19	66	4
2	Alto Valle	2	1	0	1	51	23	28	2
3	Oeste	2	0	0	2	10	104	-94	0

- POOL 2

30 September	Lagos del Sur	-	Chubut	3 - 37
7 October	Austral	-	Lagos	31 - 14
14 October	Chubut	-	Austral	20 - 18

Qualified for Zonal final

Place	Team	Games				Points			Table points
Place	Team	played	won	drawn	lost	for	against	diff.	Table points
1	Chubut	2	2	0	0	51	32	19	4
2	Austral	2	1	0	1	55	23	32	2
3	Lagos del Sur	2	0	0	2	17	68	-51	0

- ZONAL FINAL

South final
21 October	Sur	-	Chubut	26 - 7

=== "Ascenso" Final ===
Finale "Ascenso"
11 November	Sur	-	San Juan	23 - 29
18 November	San Juan	-	Sur	74 - 18

- Promoted : San Juan
