= 2002 Campeonato Argentino de Rugby =

58th championship of Campeonato Argentino

58° Campeonato Argentino
- Number of teams: 24
- Champions: Buenos Aires (30th title)
- Runners-up: Rosario
- Relegated: Mar del Plata

The Campeonato Argentino de Rugby 2002 was won by the selection of Buenos Aires

The 24 teams participating were divided on three levels : "Campeonato", "Ascenso", "Desarrollo".

== "Campeonato" ==
Si torna al Pool unico a 6 teams

1.Round
2 March	Mar del Plata	-	Tucumán	20 - 45	Mar del Plata
2 March	Córdoba	-	Cuyo	35 - 19	Córdoba
2 March	Buenos Aires	-	Rosario	21 - 21	Buenos Aires

2. Round
9 March	Tucumán	-	Córdoba	42 - 13	Tucumán
9 March	Rosario	-	Mar del Plata	41 - 6	Rosario
9 March	Cuyo	-	Buenos Aires	18 - 33	Mendoza

3. Round
16 March	Buenos Aires	-	Tucumán	35 - 30	Buenos Aires
16 March	Mar del Plata	-	Córdoba	28 - 24	Mar del Plata
16 March	Rosario	-	Buenos Aires	20 - 12	Rosario

4.Round
23 March	Tucumán	-	Cuyo	50 - 25	Tucumán
23 March	Buenos Aires	-	Mar del Plata	38 - 19	Buenos Aires
23 March	Córdoba	-	Rosario	18 - 27	Córdoba

5. Round
30 March	Cuyo	-	Mar del Plata	32 - 19	Mendoza
30 March	Rosario	-	Tucumán	21 - 20	Rosario
30 March	Córdoba	-	Buenos Aires	10 - 32	Córdoba

- Ranking:

Champions
Relegated

Place	Team	Games				Points			Table points
Place	Team	played	won	drawn	lost	for	against	diff.	Table points
1	Buenos Aires	5	4	1	0	159	98	61	9
2	Rosario	5	4	1	0	130	77	53	9
3	Tucumàn	5	3	0	2	184	114	70	6
4	Córdoba	5	1	0	4	100	148	-48	2
5	Cuyo	5	1	0	4	106	157	-51	2
6	Mar del Plata	5	1	0	4	92	177	-85	2

== "Ascenso" ==
=== Pool South ===
1.round
2 March	Austral	-	Sur	16 - 3
2 March	San Juan	-	Chubut	27 - 13

2.round
9 March	Salta	-	Noreste	18 - 0
9 March	Santa Fe	-	Entre Rios	25 - 31

3.round
16 March	Entre Rios	-	Noreste	25 - 31
16 March	Santa Fe	-	Salta	29 - 19

- Ranking:

Qualified for finals
Relegated

Place	Team	Games				Points			Table points
Place	Team	played	won	drawn	lost	for	against	diff.	Table points
1	San Juan	3	2	0	1	94	59	35	4
2	Chubut	3	2	0	1	66	64	2	4
3	Sur	3	1	0	2	40	88	-48	2
4	Austral	3	1	0	2	62	51	11	2

=== Pool North ===
1.Round
2 March	Salta	-	Entre Rios	40 - 26
2 March	Noreste	-	Santa Fe	22 - 15

2.Round
9 March	Salta	-	Noreste	18 - 0
9 March	Santa Fe	-	Entre Rios	25 - 31

3.Round
16 March	Entre Rios	-	Noreste	25 - 31
16 March	Santa Fe	-	Salta	29 - 19

- Ranking

Qualified for finals
Relegated

Place	Team	Games				Points			Table points
Place	Team	played	won	drawn	lost	for	against	diff.	Table points
1	Salta	3	2	0	1	77	55	22	4
2	Noreste	3	2	0	1	53	58	-5	4
3	Santa Fè	3	1	0	2	67	72	-5	2
4	Entre Rios	3	1	0	2	82	94	-12	2

=== Semifinals ===
Semifinals
23 March	Salta	-	Chubut	24 - 14
23 March	San Juan	-	Noreste	31 - 33

=== Final ===
Finale
30 March	Salta	-	Noreste	26 - 6

- Promoted: Salta
- Relegated: Entre Rios and Austral

== "Desarollo" (development) ==
New name and formula for the third level of the championship

=== Pool North ===
1.Round
2 March	Formosa	-	Santiago del estero	30 - 52
2 March	Misiones	-	Jujuy	72 - 8

2. Round
9 March	Jujuy	-	Formosa	42 - 19
9 March	Santiago del estero	-	La Rioja	77 - 0

3. Round
16 March	La Rioja	-	Jujuy	38 - 14
16 March	Formosa	-	Misiones	77 - 27

4.Round
23 March	Misiones	-	La Rioja	20 - 5
23 March	Jujuy	-	Santiago del estero	27 - 60

5. Round
30 March	Santiago del estero	-	Misiones	39 - 13
30 March	La Rioja	-	Formosa	-

- Ranking

Promoted

Place	Team	Games				Points			Table points
Place	Team	played	won	drawn	lost	for	against	diff.	Table points
1	Santiago de l'Estero	4	4	0	0	228	59	169	8
2	Misiones	4	3	0	1	132	74	58	6
3	La Rioja	3	1	0	2	43	111	-68	2
4	Jujuy	4	1	0	3	91	189	-98	2
5	Formosa	3	0	0	3	60	121	-61	0

Promossa: Santiago de l'Estero

=== Pool South ===
1.Round
2 March	Centro	-	URBA "B"	7 - 54
2 March	Alto Valle	-	Oeste	45 - 17

2.Round
9 March	Alto Valle	-	URBA "B"	7 - 30
9 March	Oeste	-	Centro	11 - 18

3.Round
16 March	Tierra del Fuego	-	Alto Valle	6 - 29
16 March	Oeste	-	URBA "B"	11 - 26

4.Round
23 March	Alto Valle	-	Centro	28 - 17
28 March	Centro	-	Tierra del Fuego	16 - 26

5.Round
30 March	Oeste	-	Tierra del Fuego	22 - 24
1 April	URBA "B"	-	Tierra del Fuego	102 - 14

Promoted

Place	Team	Games				Points			Table points
Place	Team	played	won	drawn	lost	for	against	diff.	Table points
1	Alto Valle	4	3	0	1	109	70	39	6
2	Tierra del Fuego	4	2	0	2	70	169	-99	4
3	Centro	4	1	0	3	58	119	-61	2
4	Oeste	4	0	0	4	61	113	-52	0
	Buenos Aires B (out of ranking)	4	4	0	0	212	39	173	8
