= 1982 Campeonato Argentino de Rugby =

38º Campeonato Argentino de Mayores
- Countries: Argentina
- Number of teams: 18
- Champions: Buenos Aires (19th title)
- Runners-up: Tucumàn

The Campeonato Argentino de Rugby 1982 was won by the selection of Buenos Aires that beat in the final the selection of Unión de Rugby de Tucumàn

== Rugby Union in Argentina in 1982 ==
=== National ===
- The Buenos Aires Championship was won by C.A.S.I.
- The Cordoba Province Championship was won by Tala and Córdoba AC
- The North-East Championship was won by Lawn Tennis

=== International ===
- The Sudamérica XV made his second tour in South Africa. The team (a masked version of Argentine national team) obtained an historical victory in the second test in Bloemfontein (21-12).
- The Argentine national team visited at the end of the year to France and Spain. Not a great tour with two loss with France.

== Preliminaries ==
=== Poule 1 ===
PRELIMINARY
4 September	Jujuy	-	Santiago Estero	6 - 30	Jujuy

1st round
18 September	Tucumán	-	Santiago Estero	73 - 4	Tucumán
18 September	Salta	-	Noreste	14 - 22	Tucumán

Finale 3 posto
19 September	Santiago Estero	-	Salta	41 - 6	Tucumán

Finale 1. posto
19 September	Tucumán	-	Noreste	51 - 18	Tucumán

=== Poule 2 ===
1st round
18 September	Rosario	-	Misiones	80 - 0	Rosario
18 September	Santa Fe	-	Córdoba	3 - 46	Rosario

,

2nd round
19 September	Misiones	-	Santa Fe	12 - 56	Rosario

INTERZONE
19 September	Rosario	-	Córdoba	25 - 14	Rosario

=== Poule 3 ===
PRELIMINARY
11 September	Sur	-	Tandil	12 - 6	Bahía Blanca

1st round
18 September	Mar del Plata	-	Entre Rios	27 - 6	Mar del Plata
18 September	Cuyo	-	Sur	19 - 4	Mar del Plata

Finale 3 posto
19 September	Entre Rios	-	Sur	6 - 15	Mar del Plata

Finale 1. posto
19 September	Mar del Plata	-	Cuyo	9 - 6	Mar del Plata

=== Poule 4 ===
1st round
23 May	Rio Negro y Neuquén	-	Austral	67 - 0	Rio Negro
23 May	Buenos Aires	-	Chubut	120 - 0	Rio Negro

INTERZONE
25 May	Rio Negro y Neuquén	-	Buenos Aires	0 - 100	Rio Negro

=== Interzone ===
INTERZONE
9 July	Mar del Plata	-	Buenos Aires	3 - 45	Mar del Plata

== Semifinals ==
1º October 1982

Tucumàn	25-15	Rosario

San Juan
Referee: Edmundo Aguiar (Buenos Aires)

1 October 1982

San Juan	19-59	Buenos Aires

San Juan
Referee: Alejandro Gaspari (Santa Fe)

== Third place final ==
19 September 1982

Rosario	36-9	San Juan

San Juan
Referee: Alejandro Gaspari (Santa Fe)

== Final ==
2 October 1982

Tucumàn	19-59	Buenos Aires
Try: Terán, Imbert; Con: Ferro; Pen: Ferro, Cabrera, Sauze		Try: Dengra 3, Ure, Madero, Campo, Iachetti, Petersen 2, Cappelletti; Con: Porta 8 Pen: Porta

San Juan
Referee: Edmundo Aguiar (Buenos Aires)

Tucuman: L. Ferro, G. Taran, P. Zalarrayan, F. Garcia, P. Bleckwedel, R. Saute, P. Merlo, G.Pelau, M. Ricci, H. Cabrera, O. Fascioli, R. De Luca, D. Gomez, L. De Chazal, L. Molino
Buenos Aires: E. Sanguinoti, M. Campo, R. Madero, M. Loffreda, A. Cappelletti, H. Porta, A. Scaras, Goche, R. de Vedis, T. Petersen, E. Ure, A. Iachetti, G. Treveglini, S. Dengra, A. Courregas, P. Devoto.
