= 1964 Campeonato Argentino de Rugby =

20 °Campeonato Argentino
- Countries: Argentina
- Number of teams: 10
- Champions: Buenos Aires (3rd title)

The Campeonato Argentino de Rugby 1964 was won by the selection of Buenos Aires that beat in the final the selection of Rosario

== That year in Argentina rugby union ==
=== National ===
- The Buenos Aires Championship was won by C.A.S.I.
- The Cordoba Province Championship was won by Universitario Cordoba
- The North-East Championship was won by Cardenales
- The Buenos Aires Cricket and Rugby Club, the oldest Argentine club arrive to their 100 years

=== International ===
- In the 1964 Argentine national team won the South American Championship, played in São Paulo-
- Was announced the 1965 Argentina rugby union tour of Rhodesia and South Africa, with the begin of training at the end of 1964, for the first experience of Argentine rugby outside of South America.

== Preliminary ==
ZONE A
27 September	Santa Fe	-	Rosario	6 - 24	Santa Fè

ZONE B
27 September	Rio Negro y Neuquén	-	Sur	10 - 31	General Roca

ZONE C
15 August	Valle de Lerma	-	Buenos Aires	3 - 36	Salta
17 August	UR del Norte	-	Buenos Aires	6 - 15	Tucumán
23 August	Valle de Lerma	-	Córdoba	9 - 8	Salta
9 September	Córdoba	-	UR del Norte	16 - 3	Córdoba
27 September	Buenos Aires	-	Córdoba	28 - 11	San Isidro, Buenos Aires
27 September	UR del Norte	-	Valle de Lerma	19 - 3	Tucumán

ZONE D
27 September	Cuyo	-	San Juan	24 - 8	Mendoza

== Semifinals ==
4 October 1964

Sur	6-22	Rosario
Try: Vila; Con: Seaton 2 Pen: Torres		Try: Benzi, Avalos 2, España, Aletta 2

Base Naval, Puerto Belgrano
Referee: Ricardo Colombo (Buenos Aires)

Sur: A. Torres, A. Vila, J. Angelo, O. Fasano, E. Diez, H. De Caso, R. Urriza (cap.), J. Suárez, J. De la Cruz, R. Sánchez, R. Smith, .1. Tuminello, F. Pacho, N. Boselli, J. Dover
Rosario: J. Seaton, E. España, E. Ferraza, J. Benzi, R. Avalos, J. Scialabra, O. Aletta, J. Imhoff, A. Rinaldi, M. Paván (cap.), A. Colla, M. Bouza, H. Ferraro, J. Benvenuto, R. Esmendi.

4 October 1964

Cuyo	3-38	Buenos Aires
Try: Brandi		Try: Poggi 2, Goti 2, Silva 3, Neri. Foster; Con: Queirolo 4 Pen: Queirolo

Mendoza
Referee: Eduardo Niño (Buenos Aires)

Cuyo: J. Muñoz, O. Villanueva, Ay Meli, J. Walker, E. Casale, E. Valejos, E. Naveyra, L. Chaluleu (cap.), J. Aldao, M. Brandi, L. Novillo, J. Nasazzi, O. Luján Williams, F. Segovia, R. Farielo.
Buenos Aires: M. Dumas, H. Goti, J. O. Queirolo, M. Molina Berro, E. Neri, J. H. Dartiguelonge, A. Etchegaray, R. Foster, H. Silva, M. Puigdevall, A. Otaño, R. L. M. García Yañez, N. González del Solar, G. Mc Cormick, A. Silveira.

== Final ==
10 October 1964

Rosario	12-16	Buenos Aires
Try: España; Pen: Seaton 3		Try: Etchegaray, Neri; Con: Molina 2 Pen: Molina 2

Plaza Jewell, Rosario
Referee: César De Elizalde (Buenos Aires)

Rosario: J. Seaton, E. España, J. Benzi, E. Ferraza, R. Abalos, A. Fasce, O. Aletta, M. Paván (cap.), A. Rinaldi, José Imhoff, A. Colla, H. Ferraro, R. Esmendi, J. Benvenuto, A. Paván.
Buenos Aires: M. Dumas, H. Goti, J. C. Queirolo, M. Molina, E. Neri, M. Beccar Varela, A. Etchegaray, H. Silva, R. Foster, G. Montes de Oca, L. Varela, B. Otaño (cap.), G. McCormick, N. González del Solar, I. García Yáñez.
