= 1967 Campeonato Argentino de Rugby =

23º Campeonato Argentino
- Countries: Argentina
- Number of teams: 13
- Champions: Buenos Aires (5th title)
- Runners-up: Rosario

The 1967 Campeonato Argentino de Rugby was won by selection of Buenos Aires beating in the final the selection of Rosario

== That year in Argentina rugby union ==
- The Buenos Aires Championship was won by Belgrano AC and Club Atlético San Isidro
- The Cordoba Province Championship was won by Córdoba Athletic
- The North-East Championship was won by Los Tarcos and Universitario Tucuman
- The Club Atlético del Rosario celebrated their first 100 years of life and host the "final four" of the championship. For the first time a "Third Place final" was played
- Argentina won, as usual 1967 South American Rugby Championship
- The Union of Jujuy become independent form Tucumàn ones.

== Knock out stages ==
PRELIMINARY
6 August	Jujuy	-	Valle de Lerma	5 - 14	Jujuy
25 May	Rosario	-	Noreste	3 - 0	withdraw
6 August	Cuyo	-	Rio Negro y Neuquén	27 - 0	Mendoza
6 August	Tucumán	-	San Juan	44 - 0	Tucumán
6 August	Sur	-	Buenos Aires	0 - 45	Bahia Blanca

QUARTERS OF FINALS
12 August	Valle de Lerma	-	Rosario	0 - 19	Salta
13 August	Córdoba	-	Cuyo	20 - 11	Córdoba
13 August	Santa Fe	-	Tucumán	17 - 16	Santa Fè
20 August	Mar del Plata	-	Buenos Aires	3 - 19	Mar del Plata

== Semifinals ==
17 August 1967

Rosario	22-0	Cordoba
Try: España 2, Landó, Costante; Con: G. Seaton 2 Pen: G. Seaton 2

Plaza Jewell, Rosario
Referee: Casimiro Gutiérrez (Buenos Aires)

Rosario: G. Seaton, E. España, J. Benzi, G. Escobar, A. Quetglas, J. Scilabra, C. Cristi, J. Imhoff, M. Chesta, J. Costante, J. Sylvester, F. Tricerri, R. Seaton, M. Bouza, F. Lando. Cordoba: L. Capell, E. meta, H. Espinoza, J. Astrada, J. Seeber, O. Samuele, J. Rubio, G. Ribeca, H. Ferreyra, A. Giavedoni, R. Campra, M. Enríquez, P. Demo, J. C. Taleb, R. Loyola.

17 August 1967

Santa Fè	5-47	Buenos Aires
		Try: Rodríguez Jurado 2, Méndez 2, Pascual 2, Otaño, Walther, Morgan; Con: Méndez 5, O'Reilly 2 Pen: O'Reilly; Drop: Méndez

Plaza Jewell, Rosario
Referee: Manuel Peralta (Cordoba)

Santa Fè: J. Vera, O. Ferrero, H. Lauría, E. Bezombe, P. Bolcato, J. González, G. Ibáquez, D. Motta, R. Rapela, M. Celentano, G. Rapela, P. Dekleva, G. Rapela, J. Aguilera, J. Barbagelata. Buenos Aires: D. Morgan, M. Walther, A. Travaglini, A. Rodríguez Jurado, M. Pascual, H. Méndeez, A. Echegaray, E. Scharenberg, A. Otaño, J. O'Reilly, A. Anthony, E. Verardo, R. Foster, R. Handley, L. García Yáñez.

== Third place final ==
19 August 1967

Cordoba	18-5	Santa Fè
Try: Seeber 2, Taleb, Rubio con1= Capell 3		Try: Ferrero; Con: Bezombe

Plaza Jewell, Rosario
Referee: Casimiro Gutiérrez (Buenos Aires)

Cordoba J. Vera, O. Ferrero, P. Bolcatto, H. Lauría, e. Bezombe, R. Lozano, J. González, H. Maletti, M. Celentano, R. Rapela, D. Mota, P. Dekleva, G. Rapela, G. Rodríguez, R. Morla.
Santa Fè'; L. Capell, H. Espinosa, O. Samuele, J. Seeber, E. Meta, J. Rubio, M. Xavier, G. Ribeca, H. Ferreyra, A. Giavedoni, R. Campra, E. Manuel, C. Abud, J. C. Taleb, P. Demo.

== Final ==
19 August 1967

Rosario	9-19	Buenos Aires
Pen: Seaton 3		Try: Méndez 2, Pascual, Silva; Con: O'Reilly 2 Pen: Méndez

Plaza Jewell, Rosario
Referee: Manuel Peralta (Cordoba)

Rosario :J. Seaton, E. España, R. Villavicencio, J. Benzi, A. Quetglas, J. Scilabra, C. Christi, J. L. Imhoff, M. Chesta, J. Constante, M. Bouza, A. Colla, J. Sylvester, R. Seaton, F. Tricerri.
Buenos Aires D. Morgan, M. Walther, A. Travaglini, A. Rodríguez Jurado, M. Pascual, H. Méndez, A. Etchegaray, J. O'Reilly, H. Silva, E. Sharenberg, B. Otaño, A. Anthony, L. García Yáñez, R. Handley, R. Foster.
