= 1962 Campeonato Argentino de Rugby =

18° Campeonato Argentino
- Countries: Argentina
- Champions: Buenos Aires (1st title)
- Runners-up: Rosario

The Campeonato Argentino de Rugby 1962 was won by the selection of Buenos Aires that beat in the final the selection of Unión de Rugby de Rosario. For the first time the final was played outside of Buenos Aires in Rosario.

== Rugby Union in Argentina in 1962 ==
- The Buenos Aires Championship was won by C.A.S.I.
- The Cordoba Province Championship was won by Universitario and Córdoba Athletic
- The North-East Championship was won by Tucumán RC

== Preliminary ==
ZONE A
30 September	Santa Fe	-	Rosario	3 - 42	Santa Fe

- Ranking: 1. Rosario 2. Santa Fè

ZONE B
18 August	Sur	-	Mar del Plata	3 - 17	Bahía Blanca
2 September	Mar del Plata	-	Rio Negro y Neuquén	63 - 3	Mar del Plata
30 September	Rio Negro y Neuquén	-	Sur	3 - 19	Neuquen

- Ranking: 1. Mar del Plata 2. Sur 3. Rio Negro y Neuquén

ZONE C
18 August	UR del Norte	-	Valle de Lerma	15 - 0	Tucumán
2 September	Valle de Lerma	-	Córdoba	5 - 35	Salta
30 September	Córdoba	-	UR del Norte	17 - 9	Córdoba

- Ranking 1. Cordoba 2. Norte 3. Valle De Lerma

ZONE D
15 August	Buenos Aires	-	Cuyo	49 - 6	San Isidro, Buenos Aires
2 September	Cuyo	-	San Juan	6 - 6	Mendoza
30 September	San Juan	-	Buenos Aires	3 - 75	San Juan

- Ranking: 1. Buenos Aires 2. Cuyo 3. San Juan

== Semifinals ==
7 October 1962

Rosario	18-6	Mar del Plata
Try: Gómez, Orengo, Pavan, Con: Robson 2, Seaton, Pen: Robson		Try: Verde; Pen: Casanegra

Plaza Jewell, Rosario
Referee: Ricardo Colombo (Buenos Aires)

Buenos Aires: E. García, E. España, J. Orengo, J. Seaton, R. Abalos, A. Robson, 0. Aletta, W. Villar, J. Imhoff, A. Paván, M. Bouza, H. Ferraro, J. Gómez Kenny, J. Fernández Bussy, R. Esmondi.
Mar del Plata : O. Sastre, G. Beverino, E. Corbacho, L. Prieto, A. Verde, C. Alonso, R. Meyes, L. Ferrari, A. Salinas, E. Ferrari, C. Olivera, J. Biffaretti, 0. Arroyo, J. Casanegra, S. Vial.

7 October 1962

Buenos Aires	23-5	Cordoba
Try: Goti 3, Blaksley 2, Lavayén, Villamil, Con: Queirolo		Try: Carballo, Con: Feretti

Buenos Aires
Referee: Eduardo Niño (Buenos Aires)

Buenos Aires: F. Villamil, H. Goti, J. Queirolo, M. Molina, C. Blaksley, J. Lavayén, A. Etchegaray, D. Hogg, G. Montes de Oca, C. Álvarez, R. Schmidt, L. Varela, M. López Marti, H. Vidou, F. Álvarez.
Cordoba : H. Garutti, L. Rodríguez, E. Quetglas, J. Ramírez, J. Astrada, C. Feretti, J. Riciardello, R. Carballo, R. Loyola, E. Freguglia, J. Imas, A. González, R. Larrinaga, A. Gener, J. Cocco.

=== Final ===
12 October 1962

Rosario	11-18	Buenos Aires
Try: Aletta; Con: Robson, Pen: Robson 2		Try: Queirolo 2, Hogg; Con: Molina Berro 2, Queirolo; Pen: Queirolo

Plaza Jewell, Rosario
Referee: Eduardo Niño (Buenos Aires)

Rosario: E. García, R. Abalos, J. Orengo, J. Seaton, E. España, A. Robson (capt.), 0. Aletta, W. Villar, M. Paván, J. Imhoff, H. Ferraro, M. Bouza, R. Esmendi, F. Alonso, J. Gómez Kenny.
Buenos Aires : F. Villamil, H. Goti, M. Molina Berro, J. Queirolo, C. Blaksley, J. Lavayén, E. González del Solar, C. Álvarez, R. Hogg (capt.), G. Montes de Oca, R. Schmidt, L. Varela, F. Álvarez, H. Vidou, M. López Martí.
