= 1969 Campeonato Argentino de Rugby =

25° Campeonato Argentino
- Countries: Argentina
- Number of teams: 11
- Champions: Buenos Aires (7th title)

The 1969 Campeonato Argentino de Rugby was won by the selection of Buenos Aires that beat in the final the selection of Cordoba.

== That year in Argentine rugby ==
- The Buenos Aires Championship was won by C.U.B.A.
- The Cordoba Province Championship was won by Córdoba Athletic
- The North-East Championship was won by Los Tarcos
- During the year the Scottish team visit Argentina in a tour.

== Results ==
Change the format: the selection of the union that host the "final four" was admitted directly to semifinals.

PRELIMINARY
20 June	Cuyo	-	San Juan	28 - 0	Mendoza
22 June	Sur	-	Rio Negro y Neuquén	17 - 6	Bahia Blana

Second Round
6 July	Jujuy	-	Tucumán	3 - 35	Palpalá
13 June	Cuyo	-	Valle de Lerma	21 - 20	Mendoza
9 July	Mar del Plata	-	Sur	17 - 11	Mar del Plata
9 July	Rosario	-	Santa Fe	13 - 12	Rosario

QUARTERS OF FINALS
27 July	Buenos Aires	-	Tucumán	49 - 0	Buenos Aires
27 July	Cuyo	-	Mar del Plata	17 - 14	Mendoza
26 July	Rosario	-	Noreste	25 - 8	Resistencia

=== Semifinals ===
15 August 1969

Buenos Aires	53-9	Cuyo
Try: Travaglini 2, Walther 2, Pascual 2, Rodríguez Jurado, Anthony, Martínez, Silva, Con: Gradin 7 Pen: Gradin 2, Morgan		Pen: Gandía 3

Jockey Club, Cordoba
Referee: Jorge E. Bordabehere (Rosario)

Buenos Aires: D. Morgan, M. Walther, A. Rodríguez Jurado, A. Travaglini, M. Pascual, C. Martínez, L. Gradin, H. Silva (cap.), H. Miguens, R. Loyola, A. Anthony, A. Otaño, M. Farina, R. Handley, L. García Yáñez.
Cuyo: J. Castro, J. Villanueva, R: Tarquini, E. Gandía, C. Magnani, C. Navessi, l. Chacón, R. Portabella, E. Casale, E. Martínez, H. Martín, C. González, O. Bempo, L. Ramos, R. Fariello (cap.)

15 August 1969

Cordoba	16-20	Rosario
Try: Vaca Narvaja, Pasaglia, Espinosa, Con: Mezquida 2, Pen: Mezquida		Try: Benzi 2, R. Seaton, España; Con: J.Seaton , Pen: J.Seaton 2

Jockey Club, Cordoba
Referee: Fernando Malmierca (Tucumàn)

Cordoba: F. Mezquida, J. Faya, E. Meta, H. Espinosa, P. Barrios, J. Ulla, J. Vera, E. Vaca Narvaja, A. Resella, R. Byleveld, R. Campra (cap.), R. Pasaglia, C. Abud, H. Bianchia, G. Ribeca.
Rosario= Seaton, A. Quetglas, C. Blanco, J. Benzi, E. España (cap.), E. Ferraza, O. Aletta de Sylva, J. Imhoff, J. L. Imhoff, M. Chesta, R. Suárez, H. Suárez, S. Furno, R. Seaton, F. Lando

=== Third place final ===
16 August 1969

Cordoba	22-6	Cuyo
Try: Vera 2, Pasaglia, Vaca Narvaja, trasf.: Cappel 2, c.p.: Vera 2		Try: Chacón , , , c.p.: Gandia

Jockey Club, Cordoba
Referee: Fernando Malmierca (Tucumàn)

Cordoba: F. Mezquida, L. Capell, E: Mato, M. Cappel, H. Espinosa, J. Tejo, J. Vera, R. Byleveld, J. Aguirre, E. Vaca Narvaja, R. Campra (cap.), R: Pasaglia, G. Ribecca, H. Bianchi, C. Abud.
Cuyo: Gandía, C. Magnani, R. Villanueva, R. Fernández, J. Villanueva, C. Navessi, L. Chacón, E. Martínez, A. Granata, E. Casale, H. Martín, C. González, R. Fariello (cap.), L. Ramos, O. Bempo.

=== Final ===
17 August 1969

Buenos Aires	22-3	Rosario
Try: Pascual 2, Miguens, Harris Smith, Silva , Con: Casabal 2, , Drop: Harris Smith		Pen: J. Seaton

Jockey Club, Cordoba
Referee: Manuel Peralta Ramírez (Cordoba)

Buenos Aires : D. Morgan, M. Walther, A. Rodríguez Jurado, A. Travaglini, M. Pascual, T. Harris Smith, A. Etchegaray, H. Silva (cap.), H. Miguens, R. Loyola, A. Anthony, A. Otaño, R. Casabal, R. Handley, L. García Yáñez.
Rosario J. Seaton, A. Quetglas, C. Blanco, J. Benzi, E. España (cap.), E. Ferraza, O. Aletta de Sylva, J. L. Imhoff, M. Chesta, J. Imhoff, R. Suárez, H. Suárez, S. Furno, R: Seaton, F. Lando.

== Bibliography ==
- (in Spanish) Memorias de la UAR 1969
- (in Spanish) XXV Campeonato Argentino
