= 1976 Campeonato Argentino de Rugby =

Argentine rugby union tournament

32° Campeonato Argentino
- Countries: Argentina
- Champions: Buenos Aires (14th title)

The 1976 Campeonato Argentino de Rugby was won by the selection of Buenos Aires that beat in the final the selection of Unión de Rugby de Cuyo.

== Rugby union in Argentina in 1976 ==
=== National ===
- The Buenos Aires Championship was won by C.A.S.I.
- The Cordoba Province Championship was won by Universitario
- The North-East Championship was won by Los Tarcos and Natación y Gimnasia

=== International ===
- All Blacks visit for the first time Argentina. They won both test against Argentina
- In 1976, Argentina, visited Wales in the same period of the finals of championship. Is a greta tour with a sefetat at last minute with Wales

== Preliminaries ==
=== Zone 1 ===
1st round
4 September	Mar del Plata	-	Jujuy	60 - 3	Jockey Club, Córdoba
4 September	Córdoba	-	Rio Negro y Neuquén	28 - 6	Jockey Club, Córdoba

2nd round
5 September	Córdoba	-	Mar del Plata	3 - 9	Jockey Club, Córdoba

=== Zone 2 ===
1st round
18 September	Buenos Aires	-	Noreste	49 - 4	Jockey Club, Limache

2nd round
19 September	Salta	-	Buenos Aires	6 - 24	Jockey Club, Limache

=== Zone 3 ===
1st round
11 September	Rosario	-	San Juan	69 - 3	Duendes, Rosario
11 September	Tucumán	-	Sur	14 - 4	Duendes, Rosario

2nd round
12 September	Rosario	-	Tucumán	18 - 9	Duendes, Rosario

=== Zone 4 ===
1st round
4 September	Cuyo	-	Austral	69 - 3	Mendoza RC, Bernejo
4 September	Santa Fe	-	Tandil	14 - 4	Mendoza RC, Bernejo

2nd round
5 September	Cuyo	-	Santa Fe	19 - 14	Mendoza RC, Bernejo

== Interzone ==
Interzone
26 September	Mar del Plata	-	Buenos Aires	10 - 25	Parque Camet, Mar del Plata

== Semifinals ==
Score system: Try= 4 points, Conversion=2 points .Penalty and kick from mark= 3 points. Drop= 3 points.

9 October 1976

Buenos Aires	25-9	Rosario
Try: Ventura, Balfour, Sansot; Con: Capalbo 2, Pen: Capalbo 2, Drop: Sansot		Try: Romero Acuña; Con: Baetti, Pen: Baetti

Trelew
Referee: Alberto Roldán (Mar del Plata)

Buenos Aires:S. Gutiérrez, O'Farrell, Benyon, Sansot, Balfour, U. O'Farrell, Capalbo, Devoto, Lucke, De Vedia, M. García Haymes, Casaba, J. Rodríguez jurado, Suárez, Correa, Ventura.
Rosario:' B. Blanco, Giner, C. Blanco, Escalante, Romero Acuña, Scilabra, Baetti, Pavani, Senatore, Pecce, Mangiamelli, Svetez, Imhoff, Macat, Todeschini.

9 October 1976

Chubut	3-34	Cuyo
Pen: Vidal		Try: Terranova 2, Tarquin, Morgan, Campoy, Con: Guarrochena 3, Gancia, Pen: Guarrochena 2,

Trelew
Referee: Ricardo J. Colombo (Buenos Aires)

Chubut: Ojeda, Vidal, Van Gelderen, Amorós, Maldonádo, Rivas, Clarke, Vernetti, R. Domínguez, Iliana, Paits, Sansinena, Aguirre, Fernández, Couderc (Schmidt).
Cuyo:' Stahringher, Massera, Morgan, Tarquini, Terarnova, Guarrochena, Gancia, Crivelli, Campoy, Antonini, Viaso, Ituarte, Carro, Cichitti, Scaiola.

== Final ==
10 October 1976

Buenos Aires	19-9	Cuyo
Try: Sansot, Benyon; Con: Igarzábal, Pen: Igarzábal 2, Drop: Igarzábal		Pen: Terranova

Trelew
Referee: Alberto Roldán (Mar del Plata)

Buenos Aires: S. Gutiérrez O'Farrell, Benyon, Balfour (U. O'Farrell), I. Gutiérrez O'Farrell, Sansot, Igarzábal, Landajo (cap), García Haymes, Lucke, Casaba, Green, J. Rodríguez jurado, Ventura, Vila, Cerioni.
Cuyo:' Muñiz, Massera, Morgan, Tarquini, Terranova, Guarrochena, Chacón, Nasazzi, Naves¡, Antonini, Serpa, Ituarte, Cruz, Crivelli, Micheli.

== Bibliography ==
- (in Spanish) Memorias de la UAR 1976
- (in Spanish) XXXII Campeonato Argentino
- (in Italian) Francesco Volpe, Paolo Pacitti (Author), Rugby 2000, GTE Gruppo Editorale (1999).
