= 1977 Campeonato Argentino de Rugby =

33 °Campeonato Argentino
- Countries: Argentina
- Number of teams: 15
- Champions: Buenos Aires (15th title)
- Runners-up: Unión de Rugby de Rosario

The Campeonato Argentino de Rugby 1977 was won by the selection of the U.R.B.A. (Buenos Aires) that beat in the final the selection of Unión de Rugby de Rosario

== Rugby Union in Argentina in 1977 ==
=== National ===
- The Buenos Aires Championship was won by San Isidro Club
- The Cordoba Province Championship was won by Universitario
- The North-East Championship was won by Lawn Tennis and Tucumán RC

== International ==
- In June came in Argentina the France national rugby union team for a seven matches tour with two test matches with "Pumas" . A victory for French and a Drew the results.

== Preliminaries ==
=== Zone 1 ===
1st round
4 June	Córdoba	-	San Juan	35 - 6	Athletic Club, Córdoba
4 June	Cuyo	-	Rio Negro y Neuquén	72 - 6	Athletic Club, Córdoba

2nd round
5 June	Córdoba	-	Cuyo	23 - 3	Athletic Club, Córdoba

=== Zone 2 ===
1st round
4 June	Tucumán	-	Jujuy	6 - 13	lawn tennis Club, Tucumán

2nd round
5 June	Tucumán	-	Salta	22 - 15	lawn tennis Club, Tucumán

=== Zone 3 ===
1st round
4 June	Mar del Plata	-	Santa Fe	30 - 3	Parque Camet, Mar del Plata
4 June	Rosario	-	Tandil	55 - 6	Parque Camet, Mar del Plata

2nd round
5 June	Mar del Plata	-	Rosario	0 - 26	Parque Camet, Mar del Plata

=== Zone 4 ===
1st round
19 June	Buenos Aires	-	Chubut	26 - 0	Bahía Blanca

2nd round
20 June	Buenos Aires	-	Sur	7 - 58	Bahía Blanca

== Interzone ==
Interzone
27 June	Rosario	-	Tucumán	19 - 10	Old Resian Club, Rosario

== Semifinals ==
Score system: Try= 4 points, Conversion=2 points . Penalty and kick from mark= 3 points. Drop= 3 points.

9 July 1977

Cuyo	6-25	Rosario
Pen: Guarrochena 2		Try: Dip 2, Seaton; Con: Baetti 2 Pen: Baetti, Seaton; Drop: Dip

Universitario, Resistencia
Referee: Douglas Ker (Buenos Aires)

Cuyo: R. Muñiz, O. Morales, O. Terranova, E. Terranova, G. Morgan, P. Guarrochena, Chacón, J. Nasazzi, G. Antonini, J. Navessi (cap.), A. Cattáneo, E. Casale, R. Irañeta, Cichitti, González.
Rosario: D. Baetti, A. Nogués, H. Romero Acuña, E. Bracalenti, D. Giner, M. Dip, R. Castagna, V. Macat, R. Seaton, R. Imhoff, M. Chesta, G. Sinópoli, P. Sandionigi, J. Costante (cap.), E.Pavani

9 July 1977

Noroeste	6-39	Buenos Aires
Pen: Feuerman 2		Try: Sanz 2, Gauweloose 2, Mazzini; Con: Beccar Varela 2 Pen: Beccar Varela 5

Universitario, Resistencia
Referee: Fernando Malmierca (Tucumán)

Noreste : C. Palmetler, R. Molina, D. Romero, R. Taborda, M. González, C. Salvi, J. Pérez González (capt.), E. Giménez, J. Domínguez, J. Feliciani, L. Colignon, M. Abraham, D. D'Elía, D. Feuerman, M. Freschi.
Buenos Aires M. Alonso, A. Cappelletti, J. Trucco, G. Beccar Varela, J. Gauweloose, J. Capalbo, M. Devoto, F. Bustillo, M. Correa, A. Voltán, R. Sanz, J. Fernández (capt.), D. Chimondegui, R. Mastai, H. Mazzini.

== Third place final ==
10 July 1977

Cuyo	45-12	Noroeste

Universitario, Resistencia
Referee: Douglas R. Ker (Buenos Aires)

== Final ==
10 July 1977

Rosario	13-15	Buenos Aires
Try: Baetti; Pen: Baetti 3		Try: Braceras; Con: Beccar Varela; Pen: Beccar Varela 2 Drop: Beccar Varela

Universitario, Resistencia
Referee: Fernando Malmierca (Tucumán)

Rosario: D. Baetti, A. Nogués, F. Bracalenti, H. Romero Acuña, D. Giner, M. Dip, R. Castagna, V. Macat, R. Seaton, R. lmhoff, M. Chesta, C. Suetaz, D. Poet, J. Costante (cap.), E. Pavani.
Buenos Aires: M. Alonso, G. Alvarez, L. Balfour, A. Cappelletti, J. Gauweloose, G. Beccar Varela, R. Landajo, R. Sanz, H. Mazzini, R. Mastai, J. Fernández (capt.), S. lachetti, R. Ventura, J. Braceras, F. Bustillo.
