= 1974 Campeonato Argentino de Rugby =

Argentine rugby union competition

30° Campeonato Argentino
- Countries: Argentina
- Number of teams: 16
- Champions: Buenos Aires (12th title)
- Runners-up: Cuyo

The 1974 Campeonato Argentino de Rugby was won by the selection of Buenos Aires that beat in the final the selection of Cuyo

== That year in Argentina rugby union ==
- In 1974, was the France selection to visit Argentina, obtaining two difficult victories against "pumas"
- The selection of Buenos Aires won also the "Campeonato Juvenil" (under-19)
- The Buenos Aires Championship was won by C.A.S.I.
- The Cordoba Province Championship was won by Córdoba Athletic
- The North-East Championship was won by Universitario Tucumán

== Preliminaries ==
Four zonal group to qualify for final four

- Mar del Plata admitted directly as host.
- The winner of Zone 1 and 2 admitted to final four
- The winner of Zone 3 and 4 to an interzone barrage

=== Zone 1 ===
1st round
21 July	Buenos Aires	-	Jujuy	122 - 0	CASI, Buenos Aires
21 July	Sur	-	Austral	40 - 6	Bahía Blanca

2nd round
28 July	Sur	-	Buenos Aires	4 - 92	Bahía Blanca

=== Zone 2 ===
1st round
20 June	Tucumán	-	Santa Fe	41 - 6	Lawn tennis Club, Tucuman
20 June	Córdoba	-	Salta	51 - 6	Lawn tennis Club, Tucuman

2nd round
28 July	Tucumán	-	Córdoba	13 - 9	Lawn tennis Club, Tucumán

=== Zone 3 ===
1st round
27 July	Cuyo	-	Noreste	21 - 13	Tandil
27 July	Tandil	-	Rio Negro y Neuquén	26 - 14	Tandil

2nd round
28 July	Tandil	-	Cuyo	7 - 40	Tandil

=== Zone 4 ===
1st round
27 July	San Juan	-	Chubut	30 - 0	San Juan

2nd round
28 July	San Juan	-	Rosario	6 - 20	San Juan

=== Interzone 3-4 ===
3 August	Cuyo	-	Rosario	36 - 9	Mendoza

== Semifinals ==
15 August 1974

Buenos Aires	37-10	Cordoba
Try: A. Rodríguez Jurado 2, Walther, Villamil, Carracedo, Carbone; Con: Porta 4, Pen: Porta 2, Drop: Porta		Try: Capelli, Rotondo; Con: Bernis Salles).

Parque Camet, Mar del Plata
Referee: Robin Conti (Rosario)

Buenos Aires M. Alonso., M. Walther, A. Rodríguez jurado, R. Matarazzo, F. Villamil, H. Porta, M. Cutler;, J. Carracedo, R. Sanz, M. Iglesias (cap); C. Bottarini, J. Rodríguez Jurado; O. Carbone, F. Lafuente, M. Carluccio;
Cordoba: M. Bernis Salles, D. Ciclic, H. Aguad, M. Capelli, R. Rotondo, G. Bergallo, J. Peralta, R. Byleveld (cap.), L. Domínguez, E. Cosimi, G. Jáuregui, D. Borcoch, H. Zinni, H. Bianchi, H. Méndez;

15 August 1974

Mar del Plata	4-6	Cuyo
Try: Petita		Pen: Chacón 2

Parque Camet, Mar del Plata
Referee: Felipe Ferrari (Buenos Aires)

Mar del Plata: J. Viders, D. Filippa, R. L'Erario, C. Sosa, M. Petita, L. Pierangeli, R. Capparelli, M. Miguens, M. Riego, R. Panzarini, W. Heath (cap), M. Buenaventura, R. Sepe, N. Borro, R. Bonomi,
Cuyo:' O. Orlandi, M. Brandi, D. Muñiz, O. Terranova, C. Dora, C. Navessi (cap.), L. Chacón, J. Naves, D. García, J. Nassazzi, R. Irañeta, A. Cattáneo, C. Cruz, J. Crivelli, R.. Fariello

== Final ==
17 August 1974

Buenos Aires	16-13	Cuyo

Parque Camet, Mar del Plata
Referee: Bruno Bertelli (Buenos Aires)

Buenos Aires: M. Alonso, J. Otaola, A. Rodríguez Jurado, M. Walther, F. Villamil, H. Porta, A. Etchegaray, J. Carracedo, R. Sáenz, DI. Iglesias (cap.), C. Bottarini, J. Rodríguez Jurado, O. Carbone, R. Rocha, F. Insúa
Cuyo:' O. Orlandi, C. Dora, D. Muñiz, O. Terranova, R. Tarquini, C. Navessi (cap), L. Chacón, R. Ituarte, J. Nassazzi, J. Navessi, C. Cattáneo, R. Irañeta, C. Cruz, J. Crivelli, R. Fariello

== Bibliography ==
- (in Spanish) Memorias de la UAR 1974
- (in Spanish) XXX Campeonato Argentino
