= 1966 Campeonato Argentino de Rugby =

Campeonato Argentino 1966
- Countries: Argentina
- Number of teams: 12
- Champions: Buenos Aires (4th title)
- Runners-up: Tucumán

Il 1966 Campeonato Argentino de Rugby was won by selection of Buenos Aires beating in the final the selection of Tucumán

== That year in Argentina rugby union ==
- The Buenos Aires Championship was won by Belgrano AC
- The Cordoba Province Championship was won by La Tablada
- The North-East Championship was won by Los Tarcos
- The "Unión de Rugby del Norte" take definitely the name of Unión de Rugby de Tucumán
- The "Gazelles", Under-23 South African selection visit Argentina

== Knock out stages ==
PRELIMINARY
20 June	Noreste	-	Valle de Lerma	6-15 (extra time)	Salta
20 June	Rosario	-	-	3 - 0	San Juan (forfeited)
19 June	Córdoba	-	Cuyo	22 - 6	Córdoba
25 May	Rio Negro y Neuquén	-	Buenos Aires	3 - 48	General Roca

QUARTER FINALS
17 July	Tucumán	-	Valle de Lerma	17 - 8	Tucumán
17 July	Sur	-	Rosario	0 - 26	Bahia Blanca
17 July	Mar del Plata	-	Córdoba	0 - 5	Mar del Plata
17 July	Santa Fe	-	Buenos Aires	6 - 36	Santa Fe

== Semifinals ==
13 August 1966

Tucumàn	0-0	Rosario

Tucumán
Referee: Jorge Comotto (Buenos Aires).

Tucuman: C. Ponce, G. Casanova, H. Barbero, A. Alonso, N. Antoni, W. Rumboll, J. Frías Silva, J. Paz, J. Ghirin¬ghelli, J. C. Ghiringhelli, J. Lomáscolo, S. Bellomio, S. Poujade, R. Roldán, M. Gasparre.
Rosario J. Seaton, E. España, G. Escobar, J. Scilabra, J. Bresciaroli, J. Caballero, C. Cristi, M. Chesta, R. Seaton, R. Esmendi, M. Bouza, L. Belizan, M. Pavón, J. Costante, J. Imhoff.

14 August 1966

Cordoba	6-17	Buenos Aires
Pen: Mezquida 2		Try: Pascual, Pagano, Cornille, Loyola; Con: Casenave; Pen: Casenave

Tucuman
Referee: Jorge Bordabehere

Cordoba D. Morgán, C. Cornille, A. Pagano, M. Pascual, E. Neri, R. Cazenave, A. Etchegaray, R. Loyola, E. Elowson, G. Plesky, B. Otaño, L. García Yáñez, G. Me Cormick, R. Handley, R. Foster.
Buenos Aires F. Mezquida, R. Mule, J. Mancini, E. Quetglas, L. Rodríguez, C. Feretti, J. Del Valle, P. Demo, J. Masjoan, J. Ramírez, E. Cornella, J. Imasi, J. Coceo, C. Félix, G. Ribeca.

== Final ==
17 August 1966

Tucumàn	3-38	Buenos Aires
Pen: Ponce		Try: Cornille 2 Cazenave, Morgan, Otaño; Con: Cazenave 4 Pen: Cazenave 6

Tucumàn
Referee: Jorge Bordabehere

Tucumàn: C. Ponce, G. Casanova, R. Cuello, A. Alonso, N. Antoni, F. Burgos, J. Frías Silva, J. Paz, J. Ghiringhelli, J. C. Ghiringhelli, E. Bellomio, H. Roldán, S. Poujade, R. Roldán, F. Bach.
Buenos Aires : D. Morgan, E. Neri, M. Pascual, A Pagano, C. Cornille, R. Cazenave, L. Gradín, L. García Yáñez, N. González del Solar, G. Me Cormick, B. Otaño, A. Anthony, A. Dunn, G. Plesky, R. Loyola.
