= 1975 Campeonato Argentino de Rugby =

31° Campeonato Argentino
- Countries: Argentina
- Champions: Buenos Aires (13th title)
- Runners-up: Tucuman

The 1975 Campeonato Argentino de Rugby was won by the selection of Buenos Aires that beat in the final the selection of Unión de Rugby de Tucumàn

== The 1975 in Argentine rugby ==
- In 1975, Argentina, visited France in a Tour . The results were very good, but with two loss in the test-omatch
- The selection of Buenos Aires won also the "Campeonato Juvenil" (under-19)
- The Buenos Aires Championship was won by C.A.S.I.
- The Cordoba Province Championship was won by Tala
- The North-East Championship was won by Los Tarcos

== Premilnaries ==
The winner of previous edition and the host of "final four" (Tucuman) directly admitted to semifinals

=== Zone 1 ===
1.Round
26 July	Mar del Plata	-	Jujuy	3 - 0	(withdraw)
26 July	Salta	-	Sur	25 - 0	Parque Camet, Mar del Plata

2nd round
27 July	Mar del Plata	-	Salta	17 - 9	Parque Camet, Mar del Plata

=== Zone 2 ===
1.Round
26 July	Rosario	-	Austral	3 - 0	(withdraw)
26 July	Santa Fe	-	Chubut	22 - 8	Plaza Jewell, Rosario

2nd round
27 July	Rosario	-	Santa Fe	6 - 10	Plaza Jewell, Rosario

=== Zone 3 ===
1.Round
26 July	Cuyo	-	Rio Negro y Neuquén	34 - 0	Club Marista, Mendoza)
26 July	San Juan	-	Noreste	12 - 31	Club Marista, Mendoza)

2nd round
27 July	Cuyo	-	Noreste	43 - 3	Club Marista, Mendoza)

=== Zone 4 ===
1.Round
27 July	Córdoba	-	Tandil	41 - 0	Córdoba

=== Interzone ===
INTERZONE
3 August	Santa Fe	-	Mar del Plata	3 - 9	Santa Fe
3 August	Córdoba	-	Cuyo	7 - 26	Córdoba

== Semifinals ==
Score system: Try= 4 points, Conversion=2 points .Penalty and kick from mark= 3 points. Drop= 3 points. Ap Calculus

15 August 1975

Tucumàn	35-18	Cuyo
Try: Rojas 2, Ghiringhelli, Rodríguez, Monterrubio, Ferro, Con: Rovira 3, García, Pen: Rovira		Try: Terranova 2 Con: Guarrochena 2, Pen: Guarrochena, Drop: Navessi

Lawn Tennis Club, Tucumàn
Referee: Manuel A. Peralta (Cordoba)

Tucumàn: J. Buscetto, J. Monterrubio, J. Rojas, M. Rodríguez, F. García, C. Rovira, C. Vidal, H. Cabrera (M. Galindo), J: Bach, J. Ghiringhelli (cap.), J. Rocchia Ferro, J. Iramain, J. Pintado, J. Posse, O. Maxud.
Cuyo:' P. Guarrochena, M. Brand¡, D. Muñiz, O. Terranova, C. Dora, C. Navessi, J. Galindo, J. Nasazzi, R. Ituarte, J. Navessi, E. Sánchez, R. Irañeta (cap.), J. Micheli, J. Crivelli, C. Cruz.

15 August 1975

Buenos Aires	39-6	Mar del Plata
Try: O'Farrell 2, Travaglini, Rinaldi, Fernández, Sansot, Gauweloose, Con: Sansot 4,, Pen: Beccar Varela		Pen: Carlón, Sanguinétti

Lawn Tennis Club, Tucuman
Referee: Roque Daneri ( Tucumàn)

Buenos Aires: M. Sansot, J. O'Farrell, A. Travaglini, A. Cappelletti, R. Rinaldi (J. Gauweloose), H. Porta, E. Morgan (cap.), J. Carracedo, H.. Miguens, C. Neira, C. Bottarini, J. Fernández, F. Insua, G. Casas, H. Nicola.
Mar del Plata:' E. Sanguinetti, G. Beverino, C. Sosa, R. L'Erario, H. Carlón, L. Pierángeli, R. Capparelli (cap.), V. Minguez, M. Alfonso, M. Riego, W. Heath (M. Miguens), R. Losada, R. Sepe, N. Bosso, R. Bonomo.

== Final ==
17 August 1975

Buenos Aires	42-6	Tucumàn
Pen: García, Rovira		Try: Travaglini 2, Nicola, Carracedo, Gauweloose, O'Farrell; Con: Porta 3 Pen: Porta 4

Lawn Tennis Club, Tucumàn
Referee: Eduardo Niño / Manuel A. Peralta

Buenos Aires: M. Sansot, H. O'Farrell, A. Travaglini, A. Capelletti, R. Rinaldi (J. Gauweloose), H.Porta, E. Morgan (cap.), F. Insua, G. Casas, H. Nicola, C. Bottarini, J. Fernández, J. Carracedo, H. Miguens, C. Neira.
Tucumàn:' J. Buscetto, J. Monterrubio, J. Rozas (D. Monterrubio), M. Rodríguez, F. García, C. Rovira, C. Vidal, R. Cruz, J. Ghiringhelli (cap.), J. Bach, J. Iramain, J. Rocchia Ferro, O. Maxud (S. Bellomio), J. Posee, J. Pintado.

== Bibliography ==
- (in Spanish) Memorias de la UAR 1975
- (in Spanish) XXXI Campeonato Argentino
