= 1970 Campeonato Argentino de Rugby =

26° Campeonato Argentino
- Countries: Argentina
- Number of teams: 14
- Champions: Buenos Aires (8th title)

The 1970 Campeonato Argentino de Rugby was won by the selection of Buenos Aires that beat in the final the selection of Cordoba.

== That year in Argentine rugby ==
- After Wales (1968) and Scotland (1969), was Ireland to visit in tour Argentina. An interesting come-back after the 1952 tour. The "Pumas" won both the tests.
- The Buenos Aires Championship was won by C.U.B.A. and San Isidro Club
- The Cordoba Province Championship was won by Córdoba Athletic
- The North-East Championship was won by Universitario Tucuman

== Knock out stages ==
1st PRELIMINARY
19 July	Rio Negro y Neuquén	–	Austral	16–5	Don Bosco, Neuquén
18 July	Tucumán	–	Cuyo	3–9	Tucumán

2nd PRELIMINARY
26 July	Rio Negro y Neuquén	–	Sur	3–12	Don Bosco, Neuquén
26 July	Jujuy	–	Valle de Lerma	14–19	Jujuy
26 July	San Juan	–	Cuyo	39–12	San Juan
26 July	Santa Fe	–	Córdoba	8–13	Sanfa fe
26 July	Rosario	–	Noreste	21–8	Rosario

Quarter Finals
2 August	Sur	–	Buenos Aires	5–47	Bahía Blanca
5 August	Valle de Lerma	–	Cuyo	3–34	Salta
2 August	Córdoba	–	Rosario	13–6	Córdoba

== Semifinals ==
15 August 1970

Buenos Aires	46–0	Cuyo
Try: Walther 3, Miguens 2, Martínez, Spagnol, Silva, Pascual, Rodríguez Jurado; Con: Gradin; Pen: Gradin 2

Mar del Plata
Referee: Manuel Peralta Ramírez (Cordoba)

Buenos Aires R. Spagnol, M. Walther, A. Travaglini, A. Rodríguez Jurado, M. Pascual, C. Martínez, L. Gradin, N. Carbone, H. Silva (cap.), H. Miguens, A. Anthony, A. Otaño, L. garcía Yáñez, R. Handley, R. Foster. Cuyo: J. Castro, C. Dora, O. Terranova, R. Tarquini, M. Brandi, C. Navesi, L. Chacón, J. Nasazzi, E. Casale (cap.), J. Navesi, C. Guiñazú, R. Irañeta, O. Bempo, L. Ramos, G. González.

15 August 1970

Mar del Plata	3–18	Cordoba
Try: Martínez 2, Torrecilla; Con: Capell 3,		Try: Filippa; Drop: Martínez

Mar del Plata
Referee: Bruno Bertelli (Buenos Aires)

Mar del Plata: L. Pieringheli, D. Filippa, C. Sosa, E. Corpacho, G. Beverino, R. Caparelli, R. Lerasrio, J. C. Etchegaray, R. Losada, J. Giango, E. Mayorano, G. Isabella, R. García, R. Sepa, A. Bibbo.
Cordoba= L. Capell, C. Antoraz, J. Martínez, J. Pianillo, H. Espinosa, M. Olmedo Arana, J. Vera, D. Torrecilla, P. Demo, H. Barrera, R. Campra, R. Pasaglia, G. Ribeca, H. Bianchi, C. Abud.

== Third place final ==
16 August 1970

Cuyo	23–15	Mar del Plata
Try: Terranova, 1 penalty try, Con: Gandía, Pen: Gandía 5		Try: Alsina; Pen: Isabella

Mar del Plata
Referee: Manuel Peralta Ramírez (Cordoba)

Cuyo J. Castro, E. Gandía, C. Lomazi, O. Terranova, M. Brandi, C. Navesi, E. Naviera, J. Navesi, E. Casale (cap.), Nasazzi, E. Sánchez, C. Guiñazú, O. Bempo, L. Ramos, C. González.
Mar del Plata: E. Feulliasier, D. Filippa, C. Sosa, E. Corbacho, G. Beverino, R. Erario, R. Caparelli, J. c. Etchegaray, R. Losada, J. Gialongo, R. García, E. Mayorano, L. Franul, J. Alsina, G. Isabella.

== Final ==
17 August 1970

Buenos Aires	38–0	Cordoba
Try: Walther 2, Travaglini, Gradin, Rodríguez Jurado, Loyola, Martínez; Con: Gradin 4, Pen: Gradin 3

Mar del Plata
Referee: Fernando Malmierca (Tucumán)

Buenos Aires: R. Spagnol, M. Walther, A. Rodríguez Jurado, A. Travaglini, M. Pascual, C. Martínez, L. Gradin, R. Loyola, H. Silva (cap.), H. Miguens, A. Anthony, A. Otaño, R. Foster, R. Handley, L. García Yáñez Cordoba: L. Capell, D. Torrecilla, J. Martínez, M. Pianillo, C. Antoraz, M. Olmedo Arana, J. Vera, R. Bylleved, P. Demo, H. Barrera, R. Passaglia, J. Campra, G. Ribeca, H. Bianchi, C. Abud.

== Bibliography ==
- (in Spanish) Memorias de la UAR 1970
- (in Spanish) XXVI Campeonato Argentino
