= 1971 Campeonato Argentino de Rugby =

27° Campeonato Argentino
- Countries: Argentina
- Number of teams: 14
- Champions: Buenos Aires (9th title)
- Runners-up: Unión de Rugby de Rosario

The 1971 Campeonato Argentino de Rugby was won by the selection of Unión de Rugby de Buenos Aires that beat in the final the selection of Unión de Rugby de Rosario

== History ==
There were two tours in 1971: Argentina visited South Africa in tour, playing against the "Gazelles", the South African Under-23. (see 1971 Argentina rugby union tour of South Africa).

1971 saw the selection of Oxford & Cambridge visited Argentina (1971 Oxford-Cambridge rugby union tour of Argentina). As usual, Argentina won South American Rugby Championship (1971 South American Rugby Championship). The Buenos Aires Championship was won by San Isidro Club, the Cordoba Province Championship was won by Tala, and the North-East Championship was won by Universitario Tucuman.

== Preliminaries ==
1st PRELIMINARY
3 September	Córdoba	-	Buenos Aires	0 - 27	Córdoba
19 September	Noreste	-	Santa Fe	22 - 14	Universitario, Corrientes

,

2nd PRELIMINARY
26 September	Salta	-	Tucumán	9 - 22	Salta
26 September	Noreste	-	Rosario	3 - 19	Hogar-Escuela
26 September	Sur	-	Mar del Plata	3 - 12	Bahía Blanca
26 September	Córdoba	-	San Juan	53 - 9	Athletic Club, Córdoba
26 September	Austral	-	Rio Negro y Neuquén	9 - 15	Pico Truncado

QUARTERS OF FINALS
3 October	Rio Negro y Neuquén	-	Buenos Aires	0 - 64	Neuquén
3 October	Tucumán	-	Rosario	6 - 9	Lawn Tennis Club, Tucumán
3 October	Córdoba	-	Mar del Plata	3 - 9	Universitario, Córdoba

== Semifinals ==
Scory system: try = 3 points, conversion=2 point, penalty kick, and kick from mark=3 points. Drop = 3 points.

10 October 1971

Mar del Plata	0-33	Buenos Aires
		Try: Silva 2, Wittman, Otaño, Travaglini, Pérez, trasf.: Travaglini 3, c.p.: Silva 2 Travaglini

Mendoza
Referee: César de Elizalde (Buenos Aires)

Mar del Plata: L. Rodríguez, D. Filippa, F. Uriaguereca, C. Sosa (cap), G. Severino, R. Lerario, R. Caparelli, E. Feullasier, M. Riego, C. Etchegaray, W. Heath, D. Cordasco, R. Sepe, F. Rossi, R. Bonomo.
Buenos Aires:' M. Alonso, N. Pérez, M. Pascual, A. Travaglini, M. Walther, A. Etchegaray, R. Matarazzo, N. Carbone, J. Wittman, H. Silva, A. Otaño, A. Anthony, O. Carbone, J. Dumas, L. García Yáñez

10 October 1971

Cuyo	13-15	Rosario
Try: Brandi, Nasazzi, Chacón, Con: Gandía 2		Try: Imhoff, Pen: Seaton 3, Drop: Scilabra

Mendoza
Referee: Julio César Rico (Santa Fe)

Mendoza: J. Castro, M. Brandi, R. Tarquini, O. Terranova, E. Candia, C. Navesi, L. Chacón, J. Navesi, E. Casale, J. Nasazzi, A. Cataneo, E. Sánchez, C. González, l. Ramos, R. Irañeta.
Rosario :'J. Seaton, G. Blanco, A. Fosse, C. Blanco, C. García, J. Scilabra, S. Furno, M. Bouza, J. Fradua, R. Fariello

=== Third place final ===
12 October 1971

Cuyo	21-14	Mar del Plata
Pen: Gandía 4 Drop: Dora, Gandía, C. Navesi		Try: Uriaguereca, Feullasier; Con: Viders; Pen: Viders 2

Mendoza
Referee: César de Elizalde (Buenos Aires)

Cuyo: E. Naviera, M. Brandi, E. Gandía, D. Muñiz, C. Dora, C. Navesi (cap), L. Chacón, R. Irañeta, L. Ramos, C. González, C. Schmidt, E. Sánchez, A. Granata, J. Nasazzi, J. Navesi Mar del Plata: J. Viders, L. Rodríguez, C. Sosa (cap), F. Uriaguereca, G. Severino, R. Lerario, R. Caparelli, E. Feullasier, M. Riego, C. Etchegaray, W. Heath, D. Cordasco, R. Bonomo, F. Rossi, R. Sepe.

=== Final ===
A moment of the match

12 October 1971

Buenos Aires	14–8	Rosario
Try: Otaño, Pérez; Con: Silva; Pen: Travaglini 2		Try: García, Con: Seaton; Pen: Seaton

Mendoza
Referee: Eduardo Niño (Buenos Aires)

Buenos Aires: M. Alonso, N. Pérez, A. Travaglini, M. Pascual, M. Walther, R. Matarazzo, A. Etchegaray, N. Carbone, J. Wittman, H. Silva (cap), A. Otaño, A. Anthony, O. Carbone, J. Dumas, L. García Yáñez
Rosario:'J. Seaton, C. García, A. Fasce, C. Blanco, G. Blanco, J. Scilabra, M. Escalante, J. Imhoff, M. Chesta (cap), V. Macat, M. Senatore, R. Suárez, S. Furno, J. Fradua, R. Fariello

== Bibliography ==
- (in Spanish) Memorias de la UAR 1971
- (in Spanish) XXVII Campeonato Argentino
