= 1963 Campeonato Argentino de Rugby =

Best moment in rugby

19° Campeonato Argentino
- Countries: Argentina
- Number of teams: 9
- Champions: Buenos Aires (2nd title)

The Campeonato Argentino de Rugby 1963 was won by the selection of Buenos Aires that beat in the final the selection of Cordoba.

The teams were divided as in 1962, in four "zones" . The winners went to semifinals. For discipline reason were excluded the selection of Mar del Plata and Valle de Lerma (Salta).

== Rugby Union in Argentina in 1963 ==
- The Buenos Aires Championship was won by Belgrano AC
- The Cordoba Province Championship was won by Universitario and La Tablada
- The North-East Championship was won by Uni Tucuman

== Preliminaries ==
ZONE A
1 September	Santa Fe	-	Rosario	8 - 31	Paranà

ZONE B
28 July	Sur	-	Rio Negro y Neuquén	28 - 7	Base Naval, Puerto Belgrano
15 August	Buenos Aires	-	Sur	63 - 3	CASI, Buenos Aires
7 September	Rio Negro y Neuquén	-	Buenos Aires	0 - 98	Neuquen

- Ranking: 1. Buenos Aires 2. Rio Negro y Neuquén 3. Sur

ZONE C
15 September	UR del Norte	-	Córdoba	11 - 19	Tucumán

ZONE D
1 September	San Juan	-	Cuyo	19 - 15	San Juan

== Semifinals ==
22 September 1963

Buenos Aires	30-14	Rosario
Try: Paván; Con: Aletta de Sylvas; Pen: Aletta de Sylvas 3		Try: Neri, Gradín, Goti, Queirolo, Álvarez, Otaño; Con: Queirolo 3 Pen: Queirolo; Drop: Haack.

Referee: Tomás Blades (Buenos Aires)

Buenos Aires : 15.J.Lassalle, 14.H.Goti, 13.J.C.Queirolo,12.M.Molina Berro, 11.E.Neri, 10.J.Haack, 9.L.Gradín, 8.D.Churchill-Browne,7.E.Scharenberg, 6.C.Álvarez, 5.C.Iribarren, 4.B.Otaño (cap.), 3.G.McCormick, 2.M.Odriozola,1.E.Verardo.
Rosario: 15.C.Quijano, 14.E.España, 13.J.Benzi, 12.J.Orengo, 11.R.Mauro, 10.J.Ruiz, 9.O.Aletta de Sylvas (cap.), 8.W.Villar, 7.J.Imhoff, 6.M.Paván, 5.H.Ferraro, 4.M.Bouza, 3.R.Esmendi, 2.J.Benvenuto, 1.J.Gómez Kenny.

22 September 1963

San Juan	0-32	Cordoba
		Try: Astrada 2, Pérez, Verde, E. Quetglas, Trakal; Con: Feretti 4 Pen: Feretti 2

Referee: Fernando R. Malmierca (Tucumán)

San Juan: 15.E.Salas, 14.R.Posleman, 13.E.Vaca, 12.H.Spollansky, 11.E.Sánchez, 10.A.Basualdo (cap.), 9.D.Bustos, 8.M.Miguel, 7.H.Cipoletto, 6.R.Rodríguez, 5.A.Echegaray, 4.F.Ferreyra, 3.N.Tula, 2.R.Oliver, 1.G.Noris
Cordoba: 15.H.Garutti, 14.J.Astrada, 13.E.Quetglas, 12.A.Verde, 11.A.Quetglas, 10.C.Ferretti, 9.J.Ricciardello (cap.), 8.J.Ramírez Montrull, 7.J.Banus, 6.R.Loyola, 5.A.González, 4.E.Trakal, 3.J.Cocco, 2.A.Gener, 1.H.Pérez.

== Final ==
29 September 1963

Cordoba	3-9	Buenos Aires
Pen: Ferretti		Try: Neri 2 Drop: Queirolo

Referee: Carlos M. Seminario (Buenos Aires )

Cordoba : 15.R.González del Solar, 14.L.Rodríguez, 13.J.Astrada, 12.E.Quetglas, 11.A Quetglas, 10.C.Feretti, 9.J.Ricciardello (cap.), 8.H.Banus, 7.J.Ramírez, 6.L.Loyola, 5.A.González, 4.E.Trakal, 3.H.Pérez, 2.A.Gener, 1.H.Cocco.
Buenos Aires: 15.J.Lasalle, 14.H.Gotí, 13.J.Queirolo, 12.M.Molina-Berro, 11.E.Neri, 10.J.Haack, 9.L.Gradín, 8.M.Puigdeval, 7.D.Churchill-Browne, 6.C.Álvarez, 5.B.Otaño (cap.), 4.C.Irribarren, 3.G.Mc Cormick, 2.M. Odriozola, 1.E.Verardo.

Source of season results:

== Special Events ==
Was played two special matches. The first between the "old" Buenos Aires selection of Capital and Provincia and one between a selection of Buenos Aires and another called "El resto" ("The rest")

9 July 1963

Capital	6-13	Provincia

Referee: R. Caldwell (Buenos Aires)

15 September 1963

Buenos Aires	10-11	El resto

Referee: Emilio Aiccardi (Buenos Aires)
