= 1979 Campeonato Argentino de Rugby =

35° Campeonato Argentino de Mayores
- Countries: Argentina
- Number of teams: 15
- Champions: Buenos Aires (16th title)
- Runners-up: Unión de Rugby de Rosario

The Campeonato Argentino de Rugby 1979 was won by the selection of Buenos Aires that beat in the final the selection of Unión de Rugby de Rosario

== Rugby Union in Argentina in 1979 ==
- The Buenos Aires Championship was won by San Isidro Club
- The Cordoba Province Championship was won by Tala
- The North-East Championship was won by Lawn Tennis
- The selection of Buenos Aires won also the "Campeonato Juvenil" (under-19)

=== International ===
- In 1979 the Argentine national team went to New Zealand. The tours was scheduled in the same period of this championship. That meant the absence of better players in the championship.
- In October–November, Australia toured Argentina. Argentina won the first test-match 24-13, the Wallabies the second 17-12-

== Preliminaries ==
=== Zone 1 ===
1st round
1 September	Córdoba	-	San Juan	33 - 19	Athletic Club, Córdoba
1 September	Salta	-	Rio Negro y Neuquén	7 - 21	Athletic Club, Córdoba

2nd round
2 September	Córdoba	-	Salta	58 - 12	Athletic Club, Córdoba

=== Zone 2 ===
1st round
1 September	Austral	-	Buenos Aires	3 - 91	Parque Camet, Cipolletti

2nd round
20 August	Buenos Aires	-	Mar del Plata	18 - 3	Parque Camet, Cipolletti

=== Zone 3 ===
1st round
1 September	Mar del Plata	-	Jujuy	57 - 0	Tennis Lwan, Tucumán

2nd round
2 September	Cuyo	-	Mar del Plata	28 - 9	Tennis Lwan, Tucumán

=== Zone 4 ===
1st round
1 September	Santa Fe	-	Noreste	23 - 12	Club Nautico, Santa Fè
1 September	Rosario	-	Tandil	53 - 0	Club Nautico, Santa Fè

2nd round
2 September	Santa Fe	-	Rosario	9 - 22	Club Nautico, Santa Fè

=== Interzone ===
INTERZONE
9 September	Córdoba	-	Buenos Aires	14 - 23	Athletic Club, Córdoba

== Semifinals ==
15 September 1978

Sur	6-11	Rosario

Puerto Belgrano
Referee: Sergio Morteo (Buenos Aires)

15 September 1979

Buenos Aires	19-6	Cuyo

Puerto Belgrano
Referee: Manuel Peralta Ramírez (Córdoba)

== Third place final ==
16 September 1979

Cuyo	17-0	Sur

Parque de Mayo, Bahía Blanca
Referee: Sergio Morteo (Buenos Aires)

== Final ==
16 September 1979

Rosario	8-47	Buenos Aires
Try: Nogués 2		Try: Negri 2; Minguez 2; Glastra, Ventura, García Terán; Con: Beccar Varela 3, Sanguinetti 2 Drop: Sanguinetti

Parque de Mayo, Bahía Blanca
Referee: Manuel Peralta Ramírez (Cordoba)

Rosario: 15.Baetti, 14.Nogués, 13.Trini, 12.Escalante (cap.), 11.Basilico, 10.Dip, 9.Niccia, 8.Marengo, 7.Imhoff, 6.Poet, 5.Milano, 4.Mangiamelli, 3.Sandionigi, 2.Cristini, 2.Fernández.
Buenos Aires: 15.Argerich, 14. Ramallo, 13.Beccar Varela, 12.Jacobi, 11.Puccio, 10. Sanguinetti, 9. Nicholson, 8. García Terán, 7.Negri, 6. Glastra, 5.Minguez, 4.Bottarini, 3.Devoto, 2.Sartori, 1.Ventura (cap.)
