= 1978 Campeonato Argentino de Rugby =

34° Campeonato Argentino de Mayores
- Countries: Argentina
- Number of teams: 15
- Champions: Buenos Aires (15th title)
- Runners-up: Unión de Rugby de Rosario

The Campeonato Argentino de Rugby 1978 was won by the selection of Buenos Aires that beat in the final the selection of Unión de Rugby de Rosario

== Rugby Union in Argentina in 1978 ==
=== National ===
- The selection of Buenos Aires won also the "Campeonato Juvenil" (under-19)
- The Buenos Aires Championship was won by San Isidro Club
- The Cordoba Province Championship was won by La Tablada
- The North-East Championship was won by Tucumán RC

=== International ===
- 1978 is an important year for Argentine rugby : the "Pumas" made a tour in Europe. They obtain an historical draw with England, beat Wales "B" and Leinster. But in the end they lost surprising with Italy

== Results ==
=== Zone 1 ===
1st round
| 19 August | Chubut | - | Sur | 7 - 21 | Cipolletti |

2nd round
| 20 August | Sur | - | Rio Negro y Neuquén | 0 - 14 | Cipolletti |

=== Zone 2 ===
1st round
| 19 August | Tandil | - | Buenos Aires | 9 - 55 | Parque Camet, Mar del Plata |

2nd round
| 20 August | Buenos Aires | - | Mar del Plata | 18 - 3 | Parque Camet, Mar del Plata |

=== Zone 3 ===
1st round
| 19 August | Salta | - | Tucumán | 19 - 20 | Jockey Club, Salta |
| 19 August | Córdoba | - | Jujuy | 49 - 0 | Jockey Club, Salta |

2nd round
| 20 August | Tucumán | - | Córdoba | 15 - 18 | Jockey Club, Salta |

=== Zone 4 ===
1st round
| 19 August | San Juan | - | Santa Fe | 15 - 16 | Universidad Nacional, San Juan |
| 19 August | Cuyo | - | Noreste | 37 - 0 | Universidad Nacional, San Juan |

2nd round
| 20 August | Santa Fe | - | Cuyo | 19 - 57 | Universidad Nacional, San Juan |

=== Interzone ===
Interzone
| 2 September | Buenos Aires | - | Córdoba | 21 - 12 | Plaza Jewell, Rosario |

== Semifinals ==
2 September 1978

| Buenos Aires | 21-12 | Cordoba |

Plaza Jewell, Rosario
Referee: Roque Daneri (Tucuman)

2 September 1978

| Rosario | 32-16 | Cuyo |

Plaza Jewell, Rosario
Referee: Roberto Magnani (Buenos Aires)

== Final ==
Score system: Try= 4 points, Conversion=2 points .Penalty and kick from mark= 3 points. Drop= 3 points.

3 September 1978

| Rosario | 18-31 | Buenos Aires |
| Try: scrum, Madero, Sansot, Cubelli; Con: Porta 4 Pen: Porta | | Try: Macat, Poet; Con: Seaton, Dip; Pen: Dip, Baetti |

Plaza Jewell, Rosario
Referee: Alberto Roldán (Mar del Plata)

Rosario: 15.D. Baetti (M. Dip), 14.A. Nogués, 13.R. Rodríguez, 12.G. Torno, 11.C. Bisio, 10.J. Escalante, 9.R. Castagna, 8.D. Poet, 7.R. Seaton, 6. Risler (cap.), 5. C. Svetaz, 4.G. Sinópoli, 3. F. Semino (F. Rodríguez), 2. V. Macat, 1. R. Imhoff,
Buenos Aires: 15.M. Sanzot, 14.M. Campo, 13.R. Madero, 12.J. Trueco, 11.A. Puccio, 10.H. Porta (cap.), 9. R. Landajo, 8.T. Petersen, 7.C. Serrano, 6.H. Silva, 5.S. Iachetti, 4.G. Travaglini, 3.H. Nicola, 2.A. Cubelli, 1.A. Cerioni.
