= 1968 Campeonato Argentino de Rugby =

24° Campeonato Argentino
- Countries: Argentina
- Number of teams: 13
- Champions: Buenos Aires (6th title)
- Runners-up: Rosario

The 1968 Campeonato Argentino de Rugby was won by the selection of Buenos Aires that beat in the final the selection of Rosario

== That year in Argentina rugby union ==
- The Buenos Aires Championship was won by Belgrano AC and C.U.B.A. 16
- The Cordoba Province Championship was won by Córdoba Athletic
- The North-East Championship was won by Universitario Tucumán
- The Argentine national team, beat for the first time the Wales. A victory and a draw per the "Pumas"
- In 12 December, death at only 51 years the president of U.A.R., Juan C: Wells, that was in charge a president in 1961-62, 1962–63 and from 1965 to his death.

== Knock on stages ==
PRELIMINARY
4 August	San Juan	-	Cuyo	11 - 0	San Juan
4 August	Tucumán	-	Jujuy	11 - 5	Tucumán
4 August	Rio Negro y Neuquén	-	Sur	3 - 12	Neuquén
4 August	Rosario	-	Mar del Plata	29 - 3	Rosario
4 August	Santa Fe	-	Noreste	28 - 5	Santa Fe

QUARTERS OF FINALS
11 August	Cuyo	-	Buenos Aires	13 - 25	Mendoza
11 August	Valle de Lerma	-	Tucumán	11 - 3	Salta
11 August	Sur	-	Rosario	3 - 25	Bahía Blanca
11 August	Córdoba	-	Santa Fe	8 - 16	Córdoba

== Semifinals ==
15 August 1968

Buenos Aires	62-0	Valle de Lerma
Try: Martínez 4, Pascual 2, Loyola 2, O'Reilly 2, Walther, Elowson, Etchegaray, Anthony, Sellarés, Con: O'Reilly 6, Sellarés; Pen: O'Reilly

Belgrano A.C., Buenos Aires
Referee: Casimiro Gutiérrez (Buenos Aires)

Buenos Aires: A. Pagano, M. Walther, M. Pascual, C. Martínez, M. Lalanne, J. Dartilongue, A. Etchegaray, J. O'Reilly, E. Elowson, L. Loyola, R. Sellarés, A. Anthony, L. García Yáñez, C. Massabó, R. Casabal.
Valle de Lerma: = J. García Bes, R. Raccioppi, S. Pintos, E. Escribano, O. Dell'Acqua, H. Cornejo, A. Alderete, H. Flores, G. Smtih, M. Clement, F. Dacal, E. Clement, P. Ivona, E. Tangona, O. Giménez.

15 August 1968

Rosario	14-3	Cordoba
Try: Benzi 2, Villavicencio; Con: Ferrazza; Pen: J. Seaton		Try: Capell

Belgrano A.C., Buenos Aires
Referee: Carlos Benítez Cruz (Buenos Aires)

Rosario: J. Seaton, A. Quetglas, J. Benzi, N. Ferrazza, R. Villavicencio, J. Scilabra, O. Aletta, J. L. Imhoff, M. Chesta, J. Imhoff, M. Senatore, H. Suárez, F. Landó, R. Seaton, F. Tricerri.
Cordoba: |Formazione 2= L. Capell, H. Espinoza, M. Capell, E. Meta, R. Mulle, J. Vera, J. Del Valle, J. Baldaserre, R. Campra, P. Demo, J. Saine, M. Enríquez, C. Abud, J. Paz, G. Ribeca.

== Third Place final ==
18 August 1968

Cordoba	21-0	Valle de Lerma

Belgrano A.C., Buenos Aires
Referee: Lucas Glastra (Buenos Aires)

== Final ==
18 August 1968

Buenos Aires	18-3	Rosario
Try: Rodríguez Jurado, Pascual; García Yáñez; Con: O'Reilly 3 Pen: O'Reilly		Pen: Scilabra

Belgrano A.C., Buenos Aires
Referee: Jorge E. Bordabehere (Rosario)

Buenos Aires: A. Pagano, M. Walther, A. Rodríguez Jurado, M. Pascual, M. Queirolo, J. Dartilongue, A. Etchegaray, L. Loyola, H. Silva (cap.), J. O'Reilly, A. Anthony, R. Sellarés, R. Casabal, C. Massabó, L. García Yañéz.
Rosario: J. Seaton, A. Quetglas, J. Benzi, C. Blanco, R. Villavicencio, J. Scilabra, O. Aletta, J. Imhoff, M. Chesta (cap.), J. L. Imhoff, M. Senatore, H. Suárez, F. Tricerri, R. Seaton, F. Landó.

== Bibliography ==
- (in Spanish) Memorias de la UAR 1968
- (in Spanish) XXIV Campeonato Argentino
