= 1972 Campeonato Argentino de Rugby =

28° Campeonato Argentino
- Countries: Argentina
- Number of teams: 15
- Champions: Buenos Aires (10th title)
- Runners-up: Rosario

The 1972 Campeonato Argentino de Rugby was won by the selection of Buenos Aires that beat in the final the selection of Rosario

== That year in Argentine rugby ==
- Nel 1972 was played the first "South American Under-19 championship" ("Sudamericano Juvenil"), won by Argentina, and also the first Argentinian Under-19 Championship-won by the selection of Unión de Rugby de Rosario.
- The selection South African "Gazelles" (Under-23) visit Argentina in Tour, playing against the selection of Sur, Córdoba, Tucumán, Salta, Santa Fe and Rosario, and the Argentine national team.
- The Buenos Aires Championship was won by San Isidro Club
- The Cordoba Province Championship was won by Tala
- The North-East Championship was won by Universitario Tucuman

== Knock out stages ==
1st PRELIMINARY
2 July	Córdoba	-	Tucumán	22 - 16	Córdoba
2 July	Mar del Plata	-	Sur	28 - 19	Mar del Plata
2 July	Chubut	-	Austral	4 - 0	Rawson
2 July	Rio Negro y Neuquén	-	Cuyo	6 - 32	Neuquén

2nd PRELIMINARY
16 July	Noreste	-	Córdoba	15 - 17	Resistencia
16 July	San Juan	-	Salta	13 - 9	San Juan
16 July	Mar del Plata	-	Chubut	84 - 0	Mar del Plata
16 July	Rosario	-	Cuyo	15 - 12	Plaza Jewell, Rosario

QUARTERS OF FINALS
20 June	Jujuy	-	Buenos Aires	3 - 101	San Salvador de Jujuy
30 July	Córdoba	-	Salta	27 - 0	Córdoba
30 July	Mar del Plata	-	Rosario	13 - 20	Mar del Plata

=== Semifinals ===
Score system: try = 3 points, conversion=2 point, penalty kick, and kick from mark=3 points. Drop = 3 points.

17 August 1972

Buenos Aires	48-3	Córdoba
Try: Matarazzo 3, Witman 2, Walter 2, Altberg; Con: Harris Smith 4, Porta; Pen: Harris Smith; Drop: Porta		Pen: Mesquida

Santa Fe
Referee: Fernando Malmierca (Rosario)

Buenos Aires: 15.Dudley Morgan, 14.Mario Walter, 13.Raúl Matarazzo, 12.Tomás Harris Smith 11.Alejandro Albertg, 10.Hugo Porta 9.Adolfo Etchegaray, 8.Jorge Cariacedo 7.Jorge Wittman 6.Hugo Miguens, 5.F.Virasoro 4.José J.Fernández, 3.Mario Carluccio, 2.Ricardo Handley 1.Oscar Carbone. Cordoba: 15. F. Mesquida, 14.H. Espinosa 13.J. Martínez, 12.R. Resella 11.C. Antoraz, 10.R Agüero, 9.J. Peralta, 8.C. Barbosa, 7.J. Aguad, 6.J. Larson, 5.R. Pesagli 4.R. Gómez, 3.G. Ribeca, 2.H. Bianchi 1.Carlos Dunn

17 August 1972

Santa Fe	3-12	Rosario
Pen: Cresmann		Try: Blanco; Con: Scilabria; Pen: Escalante; Drop: Escalante

Santa Fe
Referee: Carlos Tozzi (Buenos Aires)

Santa Fè: 15.Eduardo Tenka, 14.Alberto Caino, 13.Jorge Rapella, 12.Julián Quevedo, 11.Eduardo Sales, 10.Jorge Cresmann, 9.Julián Legna, 8.Eduardo Ferrari, 7.A. Campanella, 6.Manuel Calentano, 5.Pascual Giardini, 4.Julián Angeletti, 3.Carlos Abut, 2.Jorge Tejerina, 1.Carlos Colombo Rosario : 15.Lisandro Huljich, 14.Guillermo Blanco, 13.Cesar Blanco, 12.Alfredo Fasse, 11.Carlos García, 10.Martín Escalante, 9.Joaquín Scilabria, 8.Sabino Furno, 7.Jorge Fradua, 6.José Constante, 5.Mario Bouza, 4.Rubén Suárez 3.Ricardo Imhoff 2.Miguel Chesta, 2.Eduardo Manini.

=== Final ===
19 August 1972

Buenos Aires	33-2	Rosario
Try: Walter 3, Altberg, Wittman, Porta, trasf.: Brown 3, c.p.:Brown		Pen: Scilabra

Santa Fe
Referee: Fernando Malmierca (Rosario)

Buenos Aires: 15. D. Morgan, 14. A. Altberg, 13. A. Brown, 12. R. Matarazzo, 11. M. Walter, 10H.Porta, 9. A. Etchegaray, 8. H. Miguens, 7. J. Wittman, 6. J. Cariacedo, 5. A. Anthony, 4. J. J. Fernández, 3.O. Carbone, 2.R. Handley, 1.M. Carluccio. Rosario: 15. J. Seaton, 14. C. García, 13. C. Blanco, 12. A. Fasce, 11.G. Blanco, 10.J. Scilabra, 9. M. Escalante, 8. J.C. Imhoff, 7. M. Chesta, 6. E. Manini, 5. R. Suárez, 4. M. Bouza, 3.S. Furno, 2. J. Fradua, 1.J. Constante.

== Bibliography ==
- (in Spanish) Memorias de la UAR 1972
- (in Spanish) XXVIII Campeonato Argentino
