= Unión de Rugby de Buenos Aires =

Rugby union body in Argentina

Buenos Aires Rugby Union
- Unión de Rugby de Buenos Aires
- Sport: Rugby union
- Jurisdiction: Buenos Aires Province
- Abbreviation: URBA
- Founded: 1995; 31 years ago
- Affiliation: UAR
- Affiliation date: 1995
- Headquarters: Buenos Aires
- President: Santiago Marotta
- Vice president: Gustavo Cohen
- Secretary: Patricio Campbell

Official website
- urba.org.ar
- (Argentina)

The Buenos Aires Rugby Union (Spanish: "Unión de Rugby de Buenos Aires"), usually referred as URBA, is the Argentine governing body that organises and controls rugby union in the Buenos Aires Province (including the main district, Buenos Aires Autonomous City and one team from Rosario, Santa Fe). The remaining clubs from the province are distributed amongst four other unions: Unión de Rugby del Oeste de Buenos Aires in the west, Unión de Rugby del Centro de la Provincia de Buenos Aires in the centre, Unión de Rugby de Mar del Plata in the east, and Unión de Rugby del Sur in the south.

URBA is the largest union of Argentina, with 76 clubs directly affiliated and 15 competing as guests. Those teams compete in 7 competitions organised by the body, including the Top 14, the oldest competition in Argentina with the first championship being held in 1899.

The Union also controls its representative team, which was the most successful team of the defunct Campeonato Argentino with 37 titles.

== History ==
The "River Plate Rugby Union" (RPRU) was established in 1899 in Buenos Aires by four clubs, Buenos Aires F.C., Belgrano A.C., Lomas A.C. and Rosario A.C. The body organized the first edition of the Buenos Aires' inter-club competition that same year, with Lomas being the first Argentine champion. In 1951, the change of name to Spanish "Unión Argentina de Rugby", was after a request by the Argentine Olympic committee and it continued at the same time to work as local federation of Buenos Aires clubs, and national federation, recognized by International Rugby Board.

As a result of a restructuring of the Argentine rugby in 1995, the "Unión de Rugby de Buenos Aires" was created with the purpose of organising competitions in the city district and nearest towns like San Isidro and La Plata, while the remaining part of the Buenos Aires Province (including populous cities like Mar del Plata or Tandil) remained under other provincial unions. Therefore, the RPRU championship was renamed "Torneo de la URBA" and continued with the same format, while the Argentine Union (UAR) took over national teams only.

== Competitions ==
As of 2026, several competitions are organized by the URBA. The first division is the Top 14, contested by 14 clubs of the Buenos Aires area and also the oldest rugby competition in Argentina, with its first edition held in 1899.

The URBA league system completes with Primera A (unlike its name indicates, it is the second division), Primera B (third), Primera C (fourth), Segunda (fifth), Tercera (sixth) and Desarrollo (seven, the lowest level).

Primera A to Segunda have 14 teams competing in each division, while there are 11 teams in Tercera and 10 in Desarrollo.

Other competitions organized by the URBA are "Universitario" (with 15 university teams playing in two divisions), "Femenino" (18 women's teams in two divisions), and "Formativo" (21 teams in four divisions). The URBA has also competitions for U19, U17, U16, and U15 teams.

URBA league system (2026)
Level	Competition	Teams
1	Top 14	14
2	Primera A	14
3	Primera B	14
4	Primera C	14
5	Segunda	14
6	Tercera	11
7	Desarrollo	10

== Union team ==
URBA kit

The Buenos Aires team –nicknamed Las Águilas (The Eagles)– is the most successful within the provincial teams in Argentina, having won a record 37 Campeonato Argentino titles.

=== Titles ===
==== Domestic ====
- Campeonato Argentino (37): 1962, 1963, 1964, 1966, 1967, 1968, 1969, 1970, 1971, 1972, 1973, 1974, 1975,
  1976, 1977, 1978, 1979, 1980, 1981, 1982, 1983, 1984, 1986, 1991, 1994, 1996, 1998, 1999, 2000, 2002, 2003, 2006, 2007, 2008, 2015, 2016, 2017

==== International ====
- World Club Sevens (1): 2014

=== International friendly competition ===
The URBA team has also played several international friendly matches against national teams that were touring Argentina, with several wins against some of them. Below is the list of matches played:

Year	Date	Rival	Res.	Score	Venue
1972	28 Oct	South Africa	L	12–14	Ferro Carril Oeste
1973	1 Sep	Romania	D	10–10	Ferro Carril Oeste
1974	16 Jun	France	L	9–31	Ferro Carril Oeste
1976	16 Oct	New Zealand	L	13–24	Ferro Carril Oeste
1977	11 Jun	France	L	4–38	Ferro Carril Oeste
1979	20 Oct	Australia	L	6–22	Ferro Carril Oeste
1981	23 May	England	L	25–34	Ferro Carril Oeste
1985	15 Jun	France	L	15–50	Ferro Carril Oeste
1985	19 Oct	New Zealand	L	9–31	Ferro Carril Oeste
1988	11 Jun	France	L	0–82	Vélez Sarsfield
1990	21 Jul	England	W	26–23	Vélez Sarsfield
1991	22 Jul	New Zealand	L	9–37	Vélez Sarsfield
1992	20 Jun	France	L	12–18	Vélez Sarsfield
1993	30 Oct	South Africa	W	28–27	Ferro Carril Oeste
1994	25 May	Scotland	D	24–24	Ferro Carril Oeste
1996	15 Jun	France	W	29–26	Estadio del CASI
1997	24 May	England	W	23–21	BACRC Stadium
1997	5 Nov	Australia	L	17–40	BACRC Stadium
1998	16 Jun	France	W	36–22	BACRC Stadium
1999	29 May	Wales	W	31–29	BACRC Stadium
