= Unión Entrerriana de Rugby =

Rugby union governing body in Argentina

Entre Ríos Rugby Union
- Unión Entrerriana de Rugby
- Sport: Rugby union
- Jurisdiction: Entre Ríos Province
- Abbreviation: UER
- Founded: 30 March 1979; 47 years ago
- Affiliation: UAR
- Headquarters: Paraná
- President: Nelson Di Palma
- Vice president: Gabriel Bourdin
- Secretary: Alejandro Arnau

Official website
- uer.org.ar
- (Argentina)

The Entre Rios Rugby Union (Spanish: Unión Entrerriana de Rugby) (also known by its initials UER) is the organisational body that governs the game of rugby union in Entre Ríos Province, Argentina. It is headquartered in the city of Paraná.

The best placed teams of the UER qualify to play in the Torneo del Litoral along with clubs from the Rosario and Santa Fe unions.

== History ==
The Union was founded on 30 March 1979 when the rugby clubs of Paraná, Entre Ríos, decided to create their own body because they took part in the Unión Santafesina de Rugby. The founding members were Estudiantes de Paraná, Club La Salle, El Paraná Rowing Club and Tilcara.

Other clubs then asked to be part of the union from cities such as Diamante, La Paz, Concordia, Concepción del Uruguay, Gualeguay and Nogoyá.

== Provincial team ==
The Unión is represented in the Campeonato Argentino, a competition in which each of the 25 unions that make up the Unión Argentina de Rugby (UAR) participate. The Union's best result was reaching the final in the 1984 edition.

== Member clubs ==
Clubs affiliated to the Union as of June 2018:

Club	City
Atlético Echagüe	Paraná
Capibá	Paraná
Estudiantes	Paraná
Universitario	C. del Uruguay
Los Espinillos	Concordia
Salto Grande	Concordia
Tilcara	Paraná
Paraná Rowing Club	Paraná
