= Unión de Rugby de Cuyo =

Rugby union governing body in Argentina

Cuyo Rugby Union
- Unión de Rugby de Cuyo
- Sport: Rugby union
- Jurisdiction: Mendoza Province
- Abbreviation: URC
- Founded: September 22, 1945; 80 years ago
- Affiliation: UAR
- Headquarters: Godoy Cruz, Mendoza
- President: Javier Pellegrina (2023)
- Vice president: Federico Coria
- Secretary: Martín Flamarique

Official website
- www.unionderugbydecuyo.com.ar
- (Argentina)

The Cuyo Rugby Union (Spanish: Unión de Rugby de Cuyo) (also known for its initials URC) is the organisational body that rules the game of rugby union in Mendoza Province, Argentina. It is located in the city of Godoy Cruz, Mendoza.

== History ==
It was founded in September 1945 and initially was the governing body of rugby also in the San Juan Province until the founding of Unión Sanjuanina de Rugby in September 1952.

== Competition ==
The URC organises the regional Torneo del Oeste, a competition held since 2000.

== Provincial team ==
The Union was represented in the Campeonato Argentino, a former national competition in which each of the 24 unions that make up the Argentine Rugby Union (UAR) participated. The team won its only title in 2004.
