= Campeonato Argentino =

Rugby union competition in Argentina

- Most recent season or competition: 2017
- Sport: Rugby union
- Founded: 1945
- First season: 1945
- Folded: 2017; 9 years ago
- No. of teams: 12
- Country: Argentina
- Confederation: UAR
- Last champion: Buenos Aires (2018)
- Most titles: Buenos Aires (37 titles)
- Broadcaster: ESPN
- Level on pyramid: 1

The Campeonato Argentino de Mayores (also known as Campeonato Argentino) was an annual rugby union competition held in Argentina for provincial teams. The Campeonato Argentino was strictly amateur, and only players from local clubs were allowed to play. It was organised by the Argentine Rugby Union (UAR), with the last season held in 2017.

The competing teams represented the unions of the rugby provinces that make up the Argentine Rugby Union (UAR). Some of these unions represented more than one province, for example the "Noreste" (North east) side represented the provinces of Chaco and Corrientes. Other unions represented only a part of a province, most notably the unions that make up the province of Buenos Aires and also the unions of Santa Fe and Rosario, both within the borders of the province of Santa Fe.

In the 2012 edition, the national teams of Chile and Uruguay participated at the Zona Campeonato, while the national teams of Brazil and Paraguay played in the third level.

Also in 2015 Uruguay enters in the competition with a team at Zona Ascenso. The same for Paraguay, from in 2016, in order to compete in Super 9.

== Format ==
The competition was made up of three divisions:

- Zona Campeonato, which contained the 8 best unions;
- Zona Ascenso, with the next best 8 teams divided in two pools, with the winner of each pool playing off against one of the bottom two teams of the higher level for promotion to the Zona Campeonato. The bottom team in each pool played off, the loser being relegated to Zona Estímulo.
- Super 9 (or Zona Estímulo) with 9 teams. The winner was promoted to Zona Ascenso.

== Teams ==
Unions participating in the last season ("Zona Campeonato") held in 2017 were:

Representative team	Estab.	Headquarters	Province / Area	Titles	Last won
Buenos Aires	1899	Buenos Aires	Buenos Aires Province	37	2017
Córdoba	1931	Córdoba	Córdoba Province	7	2012
Cuyo	1945	Mendoza	Mendoza Province	1	2004
Rosario	1928	Rosario	Rosario Department	1	1965
Salta	1951	Salta	Salta Province	0	–
Tucumán	1944	S.M. de Tucumán	Tucumán Province	11	2014

== List of champions ==
Since the first championship held in 1945 to the last season:

Ed.	Season	Champion	Runner-up	Score
1	1945	Provincia (1) (Note: "Provincia" refers familiarly to the Buenos Aires Province.)	Capital (Note: "Capital" refers familiarly to the city of Buenos Aires, the "Capital Federal" of Argentina.)	5–4
2	1946	Provincia (2)	Capital	9–6
3	1947	Provincia (3)	Capital	18–4
4	1948	Capital (1)	Provincia	20–18
5	1949	Provincia (4)	Capital	16–12
6	1950	Provincia (5)	Capital	6–0
7	1951	Provincia (6)	Capital	16–6
8	1952	Provincia (7)	Capital	6–0
9	1953	Capital (2)	Provincia	10–9
10	1954	Provincia (8)	La Plata (Note: Between 1952 and 1955, the city of La Plata, was called "Ciudad Eva Perón", in honor of President Juan Domingo Perón's wife.)	9–8
11	1955	Capital (3)	Provincia	6–3
12	1956	Provincia (9)	Capital	13–9
13	1957	Capital (4)	Provincia	11–0
14	1958	Capital (5)	Provincia	11–6
15	1959	Provincia (10)	Capital	3–0
16	1960	Provincia (11)	Capital	17–0
17	1961	Mar del Plata (1)	Rosario	16–0
18	1962	Buenos Aires (1)	Rosario	18–11
19	1963	Buenos Aires (2)	Córdoba	9–3
20	1964	Buenos Aires (3)	Rosario	16–12
21	1965	Rosario (1)	Buenos Aires	18–6
22	1966	Buenos Aires (4)	Tucumán	38–3
23	1967	Buenos Aires (5)	Rosario	19–9
23	1968	Buenos Aires (6)	Rosario	18–3
24	1969	Buenos Aires (7)	Rosario	22–3
25	1970	Buenos Aires (8)	Córdoba	38–0
25	1971	Buenos Aires (9)	Rosario	14–8
26	1972	Buenos Aires (10)	Rosario	33–3
27	1973	Buenos Aires (11)	Cuyo	14–0
28	1974	Buenos Aires (12)	Cuyo	16–13
29	1975	Buenos Aires (13)	Tucumán	42–6
30	1976	Buenos Aires (14)	Cuyo	19–9
31	1977	Buenos Aires (15)	Rosario	15–13
32	1978	Buenos Aires (16)	Rosario	31–18
33	1979	Buenos Aires (17)	Rosario	47–8
34	1980	Buenos Aires (18)	Córdoba	6–3
35	1981	Buenos Aires (19)	Tucumán	32–12
36	1982	Buenos Aires (20)	Tucumán	59–19
37	1983	Buenos Aires (21)	Cuyo	53–3
38	1984	Buenos Aires (22)	Entre Ríos	74–7
39	1985	Tucumán (1)	Buenos Aires	13–9
40	1986	Buenos Aires (23)	Tucumán	24–15
41	1987	Tucumán (2)	Córdoba	32–3
42	1988	Tucumán (3)	Buenos Aires	25–10
43	1989	Tucumán (4)	Rosario	12–3
44	1990	Tucumán (5)	Cuyo	27–13
45	1991	Buenos Aires (24)	Rosario	28–16
46	1992	Tucumán (6)	Córdoba	16–11
47	1993	Tucumán (7)	Rosario	24–12
48	1994	Buenos Aires (25)	Córdoba	22–13
49	1995	Córdoba (1)	Tucumán	28–24
50	1996	Buenos Aires (26)	–	– (Note: The format of the competition was changed.) (Note: No final played that season.)
50	1996	Córdoba (2)	–	–
51	1997	Córdoba (3)	–	–
52	1998	Buenos Aires (27)	–	–
53	1999	Buenos Aires (28)	Tucumán	10–8
54	2000	Buenos Aires (29)	Tucumán	35–16
55	2001	Córdoba (4)	Buenos Aires	30–20
56	2002	Buenos Aires (30)	Rosario	–
57	2003	Buenos Aires (31)	Rosario	17–16
58	2004	Cuyo (1)	Córdoba	30–12
59	2005	Tucumán (8)	Cuyo	28–9
60	2006	Buenos Aires (32)	Tucumán	34–10
61	2007	Buenos Aires (33)	Tucumán	27–10
62	2008	Buenos Aires (34)	Tucumán	10–9
63	2009	Córdoba (5)	Tucumán	15–12
64	2010	Tucumán (9)	Rosario	19–13
65	2011	Córdoba (6)	Buenos Aires	18–16
66	2012	Córdoba (7)	Rosario	29–15
67	2013	Tucumán (10)	Rosario	33–20
68	2014	Tucumán (11)	Córdoba	(Note: League format, Tucumán finished 1st of 6 with 17 points.)
69	2015	Buenos Aires (35)	Córdoba	– (Note: League format, Buenos Aires finished 1st of 6 with 25 points.)
70	2016	Buenos Aires (36)	Cuyo	–
71	2017	Buenos Aires (37)	Tucumán	–

=== Titles by team ===
Team	Titles	Years won
Buenos Aires	37	1962, 1963, 1964, 1966, 1967, 1968, 1969, 1970, 1971, 1972, 1973, 1974, 1975, 1976, 1977, 1978, 1979, 1980, 1981, 1982, 1983, 1984, 1986, 1991, 1994, 1996, 1998, 1999, 2000, 2002, 2003, 2006, 2007, 2008, 2015, 2016, 2017
Provincia	11	1945, 1956, 1947, 1949, 1950, 1951, 1952, 1954, 1956, 1959, 1960
Tucumán	11	1985, 1987, 1988, 1989, 1990, 1992, 1993, 2005, 2010, 2013, 2014
Córdoba	7	1995, 1996, 1997, 2001, 2009, 2011, 2012
Capital	5	1948, 1953, 1955, 1957, 1958
Mar del Plata	1	1961
Rosario	1	1965
Cuyo	1	2004
