= Uruguay A national rugby union team =

Uruguay A
- Union: Unión de Rugby del Uruguay
- Coach: Guzmán Barreiro
- Captain: Franco Lamanna
| Team kit | Change kit |

The Uruguay A national rugby union team are the second national rugby union team behind the Uruguay national side.

== History ==
Uruguay A have played Glasgow Caledonians and Edinburgh Reivers in a Challenge tournament in Ontario, Canada in August 1999.

In November 2014, the URU decided to baptize the team as Charruas XV, days before travelling to Brazil to face locals on a friendly match. Uruguay 'A' won the match 25–6.

As international competition, in 2015 it played the UruCup and in 2016 the World Rugby Americas Pacific Challenge.

Like provincial team, after 2012, since 2015 the team also plays regularly on Campeonato Argentino. In 2015 season it finished in the 2nd place of Zona Ascenso B.

== See also ==
- Campeonato Argentino - Provincial Championship of Argentina
- Campeonato Uruguayo de Rugby - Club Championship of Uruguay
