= 1954 Campeonato Argentino de Rugby =

10° Campeonato Argentino
- Countries: Argentina
- Number of teams: 11
- Champions: Provincia (8th title)

The 1954 Campeonato Argentino de Rugby was won by the selection of Buenos Aires Province ("Provincia") that beat in the final la Ciudad Eva Peron, selezione della città omonima, secondo la denominazione in vigore tra il 1952 and il 1955 per la città di La Plata.

Per la prima volta una squadra diversa dalla solite Provincia and Capital, raggiunse la finale.

== Rugby Union in Argentina in 1954 ==
- The "Championship of Buenos Aires" was won by Club Atlético San Isidro
- The "Cordoba Province Championship" was won by the Jockey Club Córdoba.
- The "North-East Championship" was won for the first time by Cardenales
- France national rugby union team toured Argentina and Chile, playing 12 matches, all won, with two test won by 22-8 and 30–3

== Knock out stages ==
PRELIMINARY
8 August	Rio Cuarto	-	Cuyo	3 - 0	Rio Cuarto
8 August	Rosario	-	Mar del Plata	14 - 0	Rosario
8 August	San Juan	-	Eva Peron	5 - 13	San Juan

QUARTERS OF FINALS
22 August	Provincia	-	Rio Cuarto	22 - 8	G.E.B.A Buenos Aires
15 August	UR del centro del Pais	-	Río Paranà	19 - 6	Córdoba
29 August	UR del Norte	-	Rosario	11 - 0	Tucumán
15 August	Capital	-	Eva Peron	3 - 13	G.E.B.A, Buenos Aires

SEMIFINALS
9 September	Provincia	-	UR del centro del Pais	35 - 6	G.E.B.A, Buenos Aires
12 September	UR del Norte	-	Eva Peron	6 - 9	G.E.B.A, Buenos Aires

== Final ==
3 October 1954

Provincia	9-8	Eva Peron
Try: Caffarone, Palma; Pen: Bernacchi		Try: ? Con: Gorostiaga; Pen: Gorostiaga

Referee: Aurelio Guglielmini

Provincia: R. Frigerio, E. Caffarone, A. Palma, A. Salinas, O. Bernacchi, C. Palacios, G. Ehrman (Cap.), J. Lourés, M. Sarandón, R. Grosse, O. Martínez, C. Brondstedt, C. Travaglini, V. Christianson, R. Follet.
Eva Peron: E. Massone, E. Vergara, D. Montes, C. La Rosa, A. De Cucco, E. Brea, J. Jáuregui, M. Morón, A. Fernández, H. Carnicero, L. Gitard, C. Olivera, R. Gorostiaga (Cap.), A. Dentone, R. Giner

== Bibliography ==
- (in Spanish) Memorias de la UAR 1954
- (in Spanish) X Campeonato Argentino
