= 1952 Campeonato Argentino de Rugby =

8° Campeonato Argentino
- Countries: Argentina
- Champions: Provincia (7th title)
- Runners-up: Capital

The 1952 Campeonato Argentino de Rugby was won by the selection of Buenos Aires Province ("Provincia"), which beat the selection of Capital 6–0 in the final. Nine teams participated, with the debut of Mar del Plata selection.

== Rugby Union in Argentina in 1952 ==
- The "Championship of Buenos Aires" was won by Club Universitario de Buenos Aires.
- The "Cordoba Province Championship" was won by Córdoba Athletic, which broke six years of domination of Jockey Club Córdoba.
- The North-East Championship was won by Tucumán Rugby Club.
- The Ireland national rugby union team toured Argentina and Chile. The tour saw one match cancelled due to the death of Evita Peron. Two test-matches ended with a draw and a victory for Ireland.

== Final ==
28 September 1952

| Provincia | 6-0 | Capital |

Estadio G.E.B.A., Buenos Aires

Provincia: H. Solveyra, E. Caffarone, A. Palma, J. L. Guidi, C. Arana, R. Giles, G. Ehrman, L. Allen, M. Sarandón, R. Ochoa, J. S. Morganti (Cap.), E. Domínguez, R. Follet, C. Swain, C. Travaglini.
Capital:M. A. Miguel Villar, D. Evans, E. Fernández del Casal, R. Bazán, K. Green, I. Comas, P. Felisari, C. Bertolotto, H. Fiorioli, J. O'Farrell, J. Piccardo, C. Morea, M. Lanusse, F. Erazun, R. Pont Lezica.

== Bibliography ==
- (in Spanish) Memorias de la UAR 1952
- (in Spanish) VIII Campeonato Argentino
