= 1993 Campeonato Argentino de Rugby =

Argentinian sporting competition

49° Campeonato Argentino
- Number of teams: 21
- Champions: Tucumàn (7th title)
- Runners-up: Unión de Rugby de Rosario
- Relegated: Mar del Plata and Noroeste

The 1993 Campeonato Argentino de Rugby was won by selection of Tucumàn that beat in the final the selection of Unión de Rugby de Rosario.

== Rugby Union in Argentina in 1993 ==
=== National ===
- Was played the first edition of National Championship for clubs, won by San Isidro Club that beat Tucumán Rugby Club in the final
- The "Campeonato Argentino Menores de 21" (Under 21 championship) was won by Cordoba
- The "Campeonato Juvenil" (Under 19 championship) was won by Buenos Aires
- The "Torneo de la URBA" (Buenos Aires) was won by San Isidro Club
- The "Cordoba Province Championship" was won by Jockey Club Córdoba
- The North-East Championship was won by Tucumán Rugby Club

=== International ===
- Argentina won the South American Rugby Championship, winning, as usual, all the matches. Winning that tournament, the "Pumas" obtain to play in 1994 the final of American zone of 1995 Rugby World Cup qualifying against United States.
- Argentina won both the test matches against Japan during the 1993 Japan rugby union tour of Argentina.
- Argentina lost (26-29) (23-52) both match against "Springbkos" during the 1993 South Africa rugby union tour of Argentina, the first after the end of apartheid, winning also a match against, the South African "Development" team

== Torneo "campeonato" ==
The better eight teams played for title. They were divided in two pools of four, the first two each pools admitted to semifinals, the last relegated in secondo division

=== Pool "A" ===
	Tuc.	Ros	S J	M d P
Tucumàn	––––	33-20	24-21	52-10
Rosario	20-33	––––	40-14	34-22
San Juan	21-24	14-40	––––	23-12
Mar del Plata	10-52	22-34	12-23	––––

Qualified for Semifinals
Relegated

Place	Team	Games				Points			Table points
Place	Team	played	won	drawn	lost	for	against	diff.	Table points
1	Tucumàn	3	3	0	0	109	51	+58	6
2	Rosario	3	2	0	1	94	69	+25	4
3	San Juan	3	1	0	2	58	76	-18	2
4	Mar del Plata	3	0	0	3	44	109	-65	0

=== Pool "B" ===
	B.A.	Cba	Cuy	NOR
Buenos Aires	––––	44-16	33-27	44-0
Córdoba	16-44	––––	31-30	56-6
Cuyo	27-33	30-31	––––	24-24
Noroeste	0-44	6-56	24-24	––––

Qualified for Semifinals
Relegated

Place	Team	Games				Points			Table points
Place	Team	played	won	drawn	lost	for	against	diff.	Table points
1	Buenos Aires	3	3	0	0	121	43	78	6
2	Córdoba	3	2	0	1	103	80	23	4
3	Cuyo	3	0	1	2	81	88	-7	1
4	Noroeste	3	0	1	2	30	124	94	1

=== Semifinals ===
8 May 1993

Buenos Aires	16 - 24	Rosario

CA Posadas, Misiones

8 May 1993

Tucumàn	25-22	Córdoba

CA Posadas, Misiones

=== Third place final ===
9 May 1993

Buenos Aires	32-30	Córdoba

CA Posadas, Misiones

=== Final ===
9 May 1993

Tucumàn	24-12	Rosario

CA Posadas, Misiones

== "Ascenso" tournament ==
=== Pool C ===
	S.Fè	Sur	A-V	Chu
Santa Fè	––––	43-26	22-21	57-15
Sur	21-22	––––	18-15	65-5
Alta Valle	26-43	15-18	––––	25-15
Chubut	15-57	5-65	15-25	––––

promoted
Relegated

Place	Team	Games				Points			Table points
Place	Team	played	won	drawn	lost	for	against	diff.	Table points
1	Santa Fè	3	3	0	0	122	62	60	6
2	Sur	3	2	0	1	404	42	62	4
3	Alta Valle	3	1	0	2	66	76	10	2
4	Chubut	3	0	0	3	35	147	112	0

=== Pool D ===
	SAL	STG	E-R	MIS
Salta	––––	29-21	28-33	39-16
Santiago	21-29	––––	27-16	49-10
Entre Rios	33-28	16-27	––––	35-17
Misiones	16-39	10-49	17-35	––––

promoted
Relegated

Place	Team	Games				Points			Table points
Place	Team	played	won	drawn	lost	for	against	diff.	Table points
1	Salta	3	3	0	0	96	70	26	6
2	Santiago	3	2	0	1	97	55	42	4
3	Entre Rios	3	1	0	2	84	72	12	2
4	Misiones	3	0	0	3	43	123	-80	0

Promoted: Salta Relegated:Misiones

== "Classificacion" Tournament ==
=== Pool "A" ===
	AUS	OES	CEN
Austral	––––	39-10	35-24
Oeste	10-39	––––	19-5
Centro	24-35	5-19	––––

promoted

Place	Team	Games				Points			Table points
Place	Team	played	won	drawn	lost	for	against	diff.	Table points
1	Austral	2	3	0	0	74	34	40	4
2	Oeste	2	1	0	2	29	44	-15	2
3	Centro	2	0	0	2	29	54	25	0

Promoted: Austral

=== Pool "B" ===
	CUE	JUJ
Cuenca d.S.	––––	43-20
Jujuy	20-43	––––

promoted

Place	Team	Games				Points			Table points
Place	Team	played	won	drawn	lost	for	against	diff.	Table points
1	Cuenca del Salado	1	1	0	0	76	29	47	2
2	Jujuy	1	0	0	1	34	68	-34	0

Promoted: Cuenca del Salado
