= 1948 Campeonato Argentino de Rugby =

4° Campeonato Argentino
- Countries: Argentina
- Champions: Capital (1st title)
- Runners-up: Provincia

The 1948 Campeonato Argentino de Rugby was won by the selection of "Capital" that beat in the final the selection of Buenos Aires Province ("Provincia") "(provincia)".

== That year in Argentinian rugby union ==
- The most important event was the Tour of Oxford-Cambridge selection formed by a lot of British international player, that won all the nine matches played.
- The "Championship of Buenos Aires" was won by San Isidro Club
- The "Cordoba Province Championship" was won by Jockey Club Córdoba
- The North-East Championship was won by Tucumán Rugby Club

== Knock out stages ==
QUARTERS OF FINALS
4 July	Cuyo	-	Córdoba	0 - 3	(withdraw)
4 July	UR del Norte	-	Provincia	0 - 33	Tucumán
4 July	Capital	-	Montevideo Cricket Club	58 - 0	C.A.S.I., Buenos Aires
4 July	Estudiantes Paranà	-	UR del Norte	6 - 3	C.A.S.I., Buenos Aires

SEMIFINALS
11 July	Provincia	-	Córdoba	55 - 0	C.A.S.I., Buenos Aires
11 July	Capital	-	Estudiantes Paranà	17 - 7	C.A.S.I., Buenos Aires

== Final ==
18 July 1948

Capital	20-18	Provincia

Club Atletico San Isidro, Buenos Aires

== Bibliography ==
- (in Spanish) Memorias de la UAR 1948
- (in Spanish) IV Campeonato Argentino
