= 2010 Campeonato Argentino de Rugby =

66° Campeonato Argentino
- Champions: Tucumàn (7th title)
- Runners-up: Rosario
- Relegated: Noreste

The 2010 Campeonato Argentino de Rugby was won by the selection of Tucumàn that beat in the final the selection of Rosario.

The championship returned to be played on three levels.

== "Campeonato" ==
Two pools of four teams The first two to semifinals.

The fourth of each pools played the remaining on their maximum levels, either the two winners of "ascenso".

=== Pool 1 ===
1ª round
27 March	Cordoba	.	Rosario	44-6	Cordoba
27 March	Buenos Aires	.	Noreste	33-27	Buenos Aires

2ª round
3 April	Noreste	.	Cordoba	29-30	Resistencia
3 April	Buenos Aires	.	Rosario	21-22	Buenos Aires

3ª round: 10 April / Cordoba / . / Buenos Aires / 22-12 / Cordoba; 10 April / Rosario / . / Noreste / 58-5 / Rosario

Qualified for Semifinals
to relegation/promotion play-out

Place	Team	Games				Points			Bonus	Table points
Place	Team	played	won	drawn	lost	for	against	diff.	Bonus	Table points
1	Cordoba	3	2	0	1	96	47	+49	2	10
2	Rosario	3	2	0	1	86	70	+16	1	9
3	Buenos Aires	3	1	0	2	66	71	-5	2	6
4	Noreste	3	1	0	2	61	121	-60	0	4

=== Pool 2 ===
1ª round: 27 March / Tucumàn / . / Santa Fè / 41-18 / S.Miguel de T.; 27 March / Salta / . / Cuyo / 19-15 / Salta

2ª round: 3 April / Cuyo / . / Tucumàn / 30-26 / Mendoza); 3 April / Salta / . / Santa Fè / 36-19 / Cordoba

3ª round: 10 April / Tucumàn / . / Salta / 30-18 / S.Miguel de T.; 10 April / Santa Fè / . / Cuyo / 23-28 / Santa Fé

Qualified for Semifinals
to relegation/promotion play-out

Place	Team	Games				Points			Bonus	Table points
Place	Team	played	won	drawn	lost	for	against	diff.	Bonus	Table points
1	Cuyo	3	2	0	1	73	68	+5	2	10
2	Tucumàn	3	2	0	1	97	66	+31	2	10
3	Salta	3	2	0	1	73	64	+9	0	8
4	Santa Fè	3	0	0	3	60	105	-45	1	1

=== Semifinals ===
Semifinals
17 April	Córdoba	-	Tucumán	21 - 23	Córdoba
17 April	Cuyo	-	Rosario	16 - 23	Mendoza

== Final ==
24 April 2010

Rosario	13-19	Tucumàn
Try: 2' – 27' Imhoff; Pen: 56' Miralles		Try: 25' Ascarate; Con: 26' Sanchez; Pen: 6' 12' 39' 84' Sanchez

Jockey Club, Rosario
Referee: Javier Mancuso (Cordoba)

Rosario: 1. Santiago Sodini, 2. Franco Manavella, 3. Jerónimo Negrotto, 4. Pablo Bouza (cap), 5. Aníbal Schiavo, 6. Galo Dellavedova, 7. Pablo Colacrai, 8. José Basso, 9. Pedro Escalante, 10. Mateo Escalante, 11. Juan Imhoff, 12. Alejo Fradua, 13. Nicolás Gatarello, 14. Pablo Iguri, 15. Román Miralles., sostituti:, 16. Matías Massafra, 17. Walter Alderete, 18. Manuel Baravalle, 19. Simón Boffelli, 20. Magin Moliné, 21. Federico Amelong, 22. Tomás Carrió.
Tucumàn :1. Edgardo Herrera, 2. Juan Ávila, 3. Bruno Cuezzo, 4. Juan Pablo Lagarrigue, 5. Gabriel Pata Curello (c), 6. Antonio Ahualli de Chazal, 7. Agustín Guzmán, 8. Ignacio Haustein, 9. Diego Ternavasio, 10. Nicolás Sánchez, 11. Aníbal Terán, 12. Gabriel Ascárate, 13. Ezequiel Faralle, 14. Juan Manuel Ponce, 15. Lucas Barrera Oro, sostituti:, 16. Roberto Tejerizo, 17. Germán Araoz, 18. Patricio Jiménez, 19. Nicolás Centurión, 20. Luis Castillo, 21. Joaquín Romano, 22. Álvaro López González.

== "Ascenso" ==
=== Pool 1 ===
1.Round
27 March	San Juan	-	Mar del Plata	12 - 10	San Juan
27 March	Santiago	-	Entre Rios	25 - 21	Santiago del Estero

2.Round
3 April	Entre Rios	-	San Juan	33 - 14	Paraná
3 April	Santiago	-	Mar del Plata	24 - 25	Santiago del Estero

3.Round
10 April	San Juan	-	Santiago	27 - 21	San Juan
10 April	Mar del Plata	-	Entre Rios	39 - 13	Mar del Plata

Qualified for Semifinals
to relegation/promotion play-out

Place	Team	Games				Points			Bonus	Table points
Place	Team	played	won	drawn	lost	for	against	diff.	Bonus	Table points
1	Mar del Plata	3	2	0	1	73	49	+24	2	10
2	San Juan	3	2	0	1	53	64	-11	1	9
3	Santiago	3	1	0	2	70	73	-3	3	7
4	Entre Rios	3	1	0	2	67	78	-11	2	6

- Mar del Plata to playout for promotion to "Ascenso"
- Entre Rios to play-out to relegation in "Promocional"

=== Pool 2 ===
1.Round
27 March	Sur	-	Chubut	36 - 16	Bahía Blanca
27 March	Austral	-	Alto Valle	5 - 33	Neuquén

2.Round
3 April	Alto Valle	-	Sur	16 - 10	Neuquén
3 April	Austral	-	Chubut	17 - 13	Comodoro Rivadavia

3.Round
10 April	Sur	-	Austral	41 - 5	Bahía Blanca
10 April	Chubut	-	Alto Valle	8 - 37	Trelew

Qualified for Semifinals
to relegation/promotion play-out

Place	Team	Games				Points			Bonus	Table points
Place	Team	played	won	drawn	lost	for	against	diff.	Bonus	Table points
1	Alto Valle	3	3	0	0	86	23	+63	2	14
2	Sur	3	2	0	1	87	37	+50	3	11
3	Austral	3	1	0	2	27	87	-60	0	4
4	Chubut	3	0	0	3	37	90	-53	1	1

- Alto Valle to playout for promotion to "Ascenso"
- Chubut to play-out to relegation in "Promocional"

=== Promotion/relegation play-out ===
The winner of pools of "Ascenso" played for promotion to "Campeonato" with the last of the two pools of "Capeonato"

17 April	Noreste	-	Mar del Plata	13 - 24	Resistencia
24 April	Mar del Plata	-	Noreste	31 - 7	Mar del Plata

- Mar del Plata promoted to "Campeonato " 2011

17 April	Santa Fe	-	Alto Valle	28 - 18	Santa Fe
24 April	Alto Valle	-	Santa Fe	13 - 26	Neuquén

- Santa Fe remain in "Campeonato " 2011

== Promocional ==
=== Zone "North" ===
POOL 1
20 March	Formosa	-	Noreste	11 - 16	Formosa
27 March	Misiones	-	Misiones	10 - 35	Misiones
4 April	Jujuy	-	Formosa	98 - 17	San Salvador de Jujuy

to final of zone

Place	Team	Games				Points			Bonus	Table points
Place	Team	played	won	drawn	lost	for	against	diff.	Bonus	Table points
1	Jujuy	2	2	0	0	61	35	+26	1	9
2	Misiones	2	1	0	1	74	28	+46	2	6
3	Formosa	2	0	0	2	25	96	-71	0	0

POOL 2
20 March	Oeste	-	Andina	8 - 42	Junín
27 March	San Luis	-	Oeste	22 - 24	San Luis
4 April	Andina	-	Formosa	98 - 17	La Rioja

to final of zone

Place	Team	Games				Points			Bonus	Table points
Place	Team	played	won	drawn	lost	for	against	diff.	Bonus	Table points
1	Andina	2	2	0	0	57	13	+44	1	9
2	San Luis	2	1	0	1	27	37	-10	0	4
3	Oeste	2	0	0	2	30	66	-36	1	1

Zone Final
10 April	Jujuy	-	Andina	11 - 56	San Salvador de Jujuy

- Andina to "promotion Play-off"

=== Zone "South" ===
7 April	Santa Cruz	-	Tierra del Fuego	17 - 55
9 April	Tierra del Fuego	-	Lagos del Sur	3 - 21
11 April	Lagos del Sur	-	Santa Cruz	30 - 12

,

to finals

Place	Team	Games				Points			Bonus	Table points
Place	Team	played	won	drawn	lost	for	against	diff.	Bonus	Table points
1	Lagos del Sur	2	2	0	0	51	15	+36	0	8
2	Tierra del Fuego	2	1	0	1	58	38	+20	1	5
3	Santa Cruz	2	0	0	2	29	85	-56	0	0

- Lagos del Sur topromotion play-off

=== Play Off ===
Participate to this finals, the two winner of South and North zone anch the last two of each pools of "Ascenso"

17 April	Entre Rios	-	Andina	49 - 5	Paraná
24 April	Andina	-	Entre Rios	17 - 39	La Rioja

- Entre Rios remain in "Ascenso" 2011

17 April	Lagos del Sur	-	Chubut	15 - 19	Bariloche
24 April	Chubut	-	Lagos del Sur	13 - 26	Trelew

- Chubut remain in "Ascenso" 2011
