= 2013 Campeonato Argentino de Rugby =

69° Campeonato Argentino de Mayores
- Champions: Tucumán (7th title)
- Runners-up: Rosario
- Relegated: Cuyo and Mar del Plata

The 2013 Campeonato Argentino de Rugby, the maximum rugby union interprovincial tournament in Argentina and older national tournament was played between 2 and 30 November. The tournament returned to be played at the end of the year. As usual, the teams were divided in 3 division : "Campeonato," "Ascenso," and "Desarollo."

Eight teams divided into two pools, with the first two of the pool to semifinals, and the other two to the two triangulars ("permanence") with the winner of the two pools of "Ascenso," to determine relegation for 2014 championship.

== Campeonato ==
=== Pool 1 ===
2 November 2013

Córdoba	16 - 21	Salta
	report

Cordoba AC, Córdoba
Referee: Claudio Antonio (Cuyo)

2 November 2013

Tucumán	56 - 6	Alto Valle
	report

Lawn Tennis, S. Miguel de Tuc.
Referee: Maximilano Tempesta (Rosario)

9 November 2013

Salta	81 - 13	Alto Valle
	report

Jockey Club, Salta
Referee: Fernando Martorell (Tucumán)

9 November 2013

Córdoba	9 - 10	Tucumán
	report

Cordoba AC, Córdoba
Referee: Federico Anselmi (URBA)

16 November 2013

Alto Valle	12 - 43	Córdoba
	report

Neuquen RC, Neuquén
Referee: Federico Fioravanti (Sur)

16 November 2013

Tucumán	48 - 12	Salta
	report

Lawn Tennis, S. Miguel de Tuc.
Referee: Agustín Ramos (Cuyo)

Qualified for Semifinals
to triangular for remaining

Place	Team	Games				Points			Table points
Place	Team	played	won	drawn	lost	for	against	diff.	Table points
1	Tucumán	3	3	0	0	114	27	+ 87	6
2	Salta	3	2	0	1	114	77	+ 37	4
3	Córdoba	3	1	0	3	68	43	+ 25	2
4	Alto Valle	3	0	0	3	31	180	149	0

=== Pool 2 ===
2 November 2013

Mar del Plata	11 - 18	Rosario
	report

Los Cardos RC, Tandil
Referee: Sebastián Figueroa (B.Aires)

2 November 2013

Buenos Aires	73 - 7	Cuyo
	report

C.A. San isidro, Buenos Aires

9 November 2013

Rosario	54 - 17	Cuyo
	report

Rosario, Jockey Club

9 November 2013

Buenos Aires	57 - 0	Mar del Plata
	report

C.A. San isidro, Buenos Aires

16 November 2013

Rosario	26 - 12	Buenos Aires
	report

Jockey Club, Rosario

16 November 2013

Cuyo	19 - 23	Mar del Plata
	report

Marista RC, Mendoza
Referee: Jason Mola (Córdoba)

Qualified for Semifinals
to triangular for remaining

Place	Team	Games				Points			Table points
Place	Team	played	won	drawn	lost	for	against	diff.	Table points
1	Rosario	3	3	0	0	98	40	+ 58	6
2	Buenos Aires	3	2	0	1	142	33	+ 109	4
3	Mar del Plata	3	1	0	2	34	94	60	2
4	Cuyo	3	0	0	3	43	150	107	0

=== Semifinals ===
23 November 2013

Tucumán	25 - 18	Buenos Aires
Try: Matías Orlando 31'; Con: Máximo Ledesma 31'; Pen: Máximo Ledesma 2', 10', 38', 42', 60', 76'		Try: Agustín Gosio 10'; Gonzalo Gutierrez Taboada 70'; Con: Gonzalo Gutierrez Taboada 70'; Pen: Gonzalo Gutierrez Taboada 28', 44',

Lawn Tennis, Tcuman
Referee: Juan Sylvestre (Rosario)

23 November 2013

Rosario	23 - 6	Salta
Try: Juan Rapuzzi 52'; Luciano Fasoletti 80'; Con: Patricio Fernández 52'; Pen: Patricio Fernández 9', 14', 67'; Luciano Fasoletti 80'		Pen: Martín Núñez 37'; Drop: Carlos Orlando 50'

Jockey Cub, Rosario
Referee: Federico Anselmi (URBA)

=== Final ===
30 November 2013

Rosario	20 - 33	Tucumán
Try: Ignacio Fantín 59'; Pen: Patricio Hernández 10', 13', 35', 39', 69',	report	Try: Augusto López 6', 28', Macario Villaluenga 54'; Con: Máximo Ledesma 6', 28'; Javier Rojas 54'; Pen: Máximo Ledesma 40'; Javier Rojas 45', 72'

Jockey Cub, Rosario
Referee: Francisco Pastrana

== Ascenso ==
=== Pool 3 ===
2 November 2013

Santa Fe	23 - 8	Santiago del Estero
	[

Ateneo Immaculada, Santa Fé

2 November 2013

Entre Rios	31 - 0	Oeste

Rowing Club, Paraná E.R.

9 November 2013

Oeste	17 - 44	Santa Fe

Los Miuras, Junin

9 November 2013

Entre Rios	17 - 34	Santiago del Estero

Rowing Club, Paraná E.R.

16 November 2013

Santa Fe	26 - 12	Entre Rios

Jockey Club, Rosario

16 November 2013

Santiago del Estero	37 - 19	Oeste

Old Lions RC, Santiago

Qualified for final triangukars
to relegation play out

Place	Team	Games				Points			Table points
Place	Team	played	won	drawn	lost	for	against	diff.	Table points
1	Santa Fe	3	3	0	0	102	48	+ 54	6
2	Santiago del Estero	3	2	0	1	79	62	+ 17	4
3	Entre Ríos	3	1	0	2	71	96	25	2
4	Oeste	3	0	0	3	66	112	46	0

=== Pool 4 ===
2 November 2013

San Juan	62 - 45	Chubut

UNSJ, San Juan

2 November 2013

Sur	22 - 27	Noreste

Soc. Sportiva, Bahia Blanca

9 November 2013

Noreste	39 - 14	San Juan

Los Miuras, Corrientes

9 November 2013

Sur	21 - 14	Chubut

Soc. Sportiva, Bahia Blanca

16 November 2013

San Juan	35 - 26	Sur

UNSJ, San Juan

16 November 2013

Chubut	27 - 18	Noreste

Trelew RC, Trelew

Qualified for final triangukars
to relegation play out

Place	Team	Games				Points			Table points
Place	Team	played	won	drawn	lost	for	against	diff.	Table points
1	Noreste	3	3	0	0	105	46	+ 59	6
2	San Juan	3	2	0	1	111	110	+ 1	4
3	Sur	3	1	0	2	69	76	7	2
4	Valle de Chubut	3	0	0	3	69	122	53	0

=== Promotion triangular ===
==== Pool A ====
23 November 2013

Santa Fe	13 - 31	Córdoba

Ateneo Immaculada, Santa Fé

30 November 2013

Cuyo	13 - 20	Santa Fe

Liceo RC, Mendoza

7 December 2013

Córdoba	74 - 7	Cuyo

Cordioba AC, Córdoba

Qualified for "Campeonato 2014"
Relegated to "Ascernso 2014"

Place	Team	Games				Points			Table points
Place	Team	played	won	drawn	lost	for	against	diff.	Table points
1	Córdoba	2	2	0	0	105	20	+ 85	4
2	Santa Fe	2	1	0	1	33	44	11	2
3	Cuyo	2	0	0	2	20	94	74	0

==== Pool B ====
23 November 2013

Noreste	18 - 21	Mar del Plata

Aranduroga RC, Corrientes

30 November 2013

Alto Valle	19 - 18	Noreste

Neuquen RC, Neuquén

7 December 2013

Mar del Plata	10 - 14	Alto Valle

IPR Sporting, Tandil

Qualified for "Campeonato 2014"
Relegated to "Ascernso 2014"

Place	Team	Games				Points			Table points
Place	Team	played	won	drawn	lost	for	against	diff.	Table points
1	Alto Valle	2	2	0	0	33	28	+ 5	4
2	Mar del Plata	2	1	0	1	31	32	1	2
3	Noreste	2	0	0	2	36	40	4	0

=== Play Out ===
24 November 2013

Chubut	27 - 18	Oeste

Trelew RC, Trelew

- Oeste relegated to third division 2014

== "Estimulo" ==
=== First Phase ===
==== Pool 1 ====
30 March 2013

Andina	10 - 6	San Luis

Junin

30 March 2013

Jujuy	3 - 24	San Luis

Junin

30 March 2013

Andina	29 - 0	Jujuy

Junin

Qualified for "Copa de Oro" (promotion)
qualified for "Copa de Plata"
qualified for "Copa de Bronce"

Place	Team	Games				Points			Table points
Place	Team	played	won	drawn	lost	for	against	diff.	Table points
1	Andina	2	2	0	0	39	6	+ 33	4
2	San Luis	2	1	0	1	30	13	+ 17	2
3	Jujeña	2	0	0	2	3	53	50	0

==== Pool 1 ====
30 March 2013

Misiones	37 - 0	Santa Cruz

Junin

30 March 2013

Jujuy	44 - 24	Santa Cruz

Junin

30 March 2013

Misiones	0 - 31	Lagos del Sur

Junin

Qualified for "Copa de Oro" (promotion)
qualified for "Copa de Plata"
qualified for "Copa de Bronce"

Place	Team	Games				Points			Table points
Place	Team	played	won	drawn	lost	for	against	diff.	Table points
1	Lagos del Sur	2	2	0	0	75	0	+ 75	4
2	Misiones	2	1	0	1	37	31	+ 6	2
3	Santacruceña	2	0	0	2	0	81	81	0

==== Pool 3 ====
30 March 2013

Formosa	23 - 3	Tierra del Fuego

Junin

30 March 2013

Austral	38 - 3	Tierra del Fuego

Junin

30 March 2013

Formosa	3 - 16	Austral

Junin

Qualified for "Copa de Oro" (promotion)
qualified for "Copa de Plata"
qualified for "Copa de Bronce"

Place	Team	Games				Points			Table points
Place	Team	played	won	drawn	lost	for	against	diff.	Table points
1	Austral	2	2	0	0	54	6	+ 48	4
2	Formosa	2	1	0	1	26	19	+ 7	2
3	Tierra del Fuego	2	0	0	2	6	61	55	0

=== Final Phase ===
==== "Copa de oro" ====
1 April 2013

Andina	7 - 3	Austral

Junin

1 April 2013

Lagos del Sur	16 - 0	Austral

Junin

1 April 2013

Andina	6 - 20	Lagos del Sur

Junin

promoted to "Ascenso" 2014

Place	Team	Games				Points			Table points
Place	Team	played	won	drawn	lost	for	against	diff.	Table points
1	Lagos del Sur	2	2	0	0	36	6	+ 30	4
2	Andina	2	1	0	1	13	23	10	2
3	Austral	2	0	0	2	3	23	20	0

==== "Copa de Plata" ====
1 April 2013

San Luis	6 - 6	Formosa

Junin

1 April 2013

Misiones	6 - 0	Formosa

Junin

1 April 2013

Misiones	6 - 11	San Luis

Junin

Place	Team	Games				Points			Table points
Place	Team	played	won	drawn	lost	for	against	diff.	Table points
4	San Luis	2	1	1	0	17	9	+ 8	3
5	Misiones	2	1	0	1	9	11	2	2
6	Formosa	2	0	1	1	6	12	6	1

=== "Copa de Bronce" ===
1 April 2013

Jujuy	6 - 6	Tierra del Fuego

Junin

1 April 2013

Santa Cruz	5 - 25	Tierra del Fuego

Junin

1 April 2013

Jujuy	0 - 6	Santa Cruiz

Junin

Place	Team	Games				Points			Table points
Place	Team	played	won	drawn	lost	for	against	diff.	Table points
7	Tierra del Fuego	2	2	0	0	49	5	+ 44	4
8	Santacruceña	2	1	0	1	11	25	14	2
9	Jujeña	2	0	0	2	0	30	30	0

== External links and bibliography ==
- (in Italian) Francesco Volpe, Paolo Pacitti (Author), Rugby 2014, GTE Gruppo Editorale (2013)
- (in Spanish) Torneo en UAR.com.ar
- (in Spanish) Reglamento de las Zonas Campeonato y Zona Ascenso en formato pdf
- (in Spanish) Reglamento de las Zona Estímulo en formato pdf
