= 1953 Campeonato Argentino de Rugby =

9° Campeonato Argentino
- Countries: Argentina
- Champions: Capital (3rd title)
- Runners-up: Provincia

The Campeonato Argentino de Rugby 1953 was won by the selection of Capital that beat in the final the selection of Buenos Aires Province ("Provincia"). There were the debuts of the selection of Rio Cuarto and San Juan

== Rugby Union in Argentina in 1953 ==
- The "Championship of Buenos Aires" was won by Obras Sanitarias
- The "Cordoba Province Championship" was won by the Escuela de Aviación.
- The "North-East Championship" was won by Tucumán Rugby Club

== Knock out stages ==
PRELIMINARY
16 August	San Juan	-	Cuyo	9 - 3
16 August	UR del Norte	-	UR del Centro del Pais	13 - 0
16 August	Eva Perón	-	Mar del Plata	9 - 0

QUARTERS OF FINALS
23 August	Capital	-	San Juan	41 - 3
23 August	UR del Norte	-	Río Paranà	19 - 6
23 August	Litoral	-	Rio Cuarto	22 - 3
23 August	Provincia	-	Eva Perón	19 - 3

SEMIFINALS
30 August	Capital	-	UR del Norte	22 - 13
30 August	Litoral	-	Provincia	3 - 36	Rosario

== Final ==
24 September 1953

Capital	10-9	Provincia

Buenos Aires

== Bibliography ==
- (in Spanish) Memorias de la UAR 1953
- (in Spanish) IX Campeonato Argentino
