= 1960 Campeonato Argentino de Rugby =

16° Campeonato Argentino
- Countries: Argentina
- Number of teams: 14
- Champions: Provincia (11th title)
- Runners-up: Capital

The Campeonato Argentino de Rugby 1960 was won by the selection of Buenos Aires Province ("Provincia") that beat in the final the selection of Capital.

In this edition, made his first appearance the selection of Rio Negro y Neuquén, while disappear the selection of La Plata, encapsulated in the "Provincia". The semifinals was not played as usual in Buenos Aires, but in Rosario and Tucuman.

== Rugby Union in Argentina in 1960 ==
- France national rugby union team visited South America, playing 13 matches, all won. 11 of the matches was played in Argentina, with 3 test against Argentina
- The Buenos Aires Championship was won by C.A.S.I.
- The Cordoba Province Championship was won by Universitario
- The North-East Championship was won by Uni Tucuman

== Knock out stages ==
PRELIMINARY
28 August	Mar del Plata	-	Río Paranà	10 - 0	Mar del Plata
28 August	Valle de Lerma	-	Rosario	6 - 16	Salta
28 August	San Juan	-	Santa Fe	18 - 6	San Juan
28 August	Rio Negro y Neuquén	-	Sur	8 - 12	Cipolletti
28 August	Rio Cuarto	-	UR del Norte	28 - 6	Rio Cuarto
28 August	Córdoba	-	Cuyo	11 - 8	Córdoba

QUARTERS OF FINALS
11 September	Rosario	-	Mar del Plata	9 - 0	Rosario
11 September	Sur	-	Provincia	5 - 39	Córdoba
11 September	UR del Norte	-	Córdoba	12 - 5	Tucumán
11 September	San Juan	-	Capital	3 - 25	San Juan

== Semifinals ==
25 October 1960

Rosario	3-14	Capital
Pen: Caballero		Try: Hogg, Salinas, Lumi, Con: Guastella, Drop: Guastella

Rosario
Referee: Carlos María Seminario.

Rosario: E. García, E. España, J. Pellejero, J.Caballero, J. Dimasse, O. Aletta, J. Ruiz, A. Paván, E. Kaden, R. Cerfoglio (cap.), A. Colla, E. Paquez, M. Chesta, N. Robson, R. Esmendi.
Capital: J. Lafleur, E. Krossler, A. Álvarez, L. Méndez, C. Salinas, A. Guastella (cap.), A. Sáenz Valiente, E. Gaviña, H. Vidou, G. McCormick, J. Lumi, W. Bunge, D. Churchill Browne, L. Sutton, R. Hogg.

27 October 1960

UR del Norte	5-6	Provincia
Pen: Campos, Drop: Ríos		Try: Esteban; Con: Nucci

S. Miguel de Tuc.
Referee: E. Aicardi

Norte: C. Ponce, Campos, J. Terán, Peiró, J. Esteban, J. Nucci, A. Frías Silva, Silva, M. Arcuri, E. Medina, J. Paz, C. Diambra, R. Terán Vega, J. Centurión, J. Ritorto.
, Provincia: J. Ríos, E. Neri, R. Oliveri, J. Guidi, R. Magnani, J. Cam¬pos, E. Holmgren, G. Montes de Oca, A. Salinas, E. Mitchelstein, R. Schmidt, B. Otaño, W. Aniz, J. Casanegra, E. Sorhaburu.

== Final ==
2 October 1960

Provincia	17-0	Capital
Try: Neri, Magnani, Otaño; Con: Ríos; Pen: Ríos 2

San Isidro Club, Buenos Aires
Referee: César de Elizalde

Provincia: J. Ríos, E. Neri, J. Guidi, R. Oliveri, R. Magnani, I. Co¬mas, E. Holmgren, G. Montes de Oca, A. Salinas (cap.), E. Mit¬chelstein, R. Schmidt, B. Otaño, E. Sorhaburu, J. Casanegra, W. Aniz
Capital: J. Lafleur, E. Krossler, L. Méndez, E. Karplus, C. Salinas, A. Guastella (cap.), A. Sáenz Valiente, R. Hogg, D. Churchill Brow¬ne, L. Sutton, J. Lumi, W Bunge, E. Gaviña, H. Vidou, G. Mac Cormick
