= 1989 Campeonato Argentino de Rugby =

45th Campeonato Argentino de Mayores
- Champions: Tucumán (4th title)
- Runners-up: Rosario
- Relegated: San Juan and Santiago del estero

The 1989 Campeonato Argentino de Rugby (Campionato argentino de Mayores) was won for the third consecutive year by the selection of Unión de Rugby de Tucumàn that beat in the final the selection of Rosario.

== Rugby Union in Argentina in 1989 ==
=== National ===
- The Buenos Aires Championship was won by Alumni and Banco Nación
- The Cordoba Province Championship was won by Tala
- The North-East Championship was won by Tucumán RC
- The selection of Buenos Aires. Won the "Juvenil" (Under-21) championship.

=== International ===
- The Italy national rugby union team, visited South America for the first time, lost honorably against "Pumas" (16–21).
- The Argentine national team visited New Zealand, obtained two heavy loss in the test match (9-60) and (12–49).

== "Campeonato" Tournament ==
The better eight teams played for the title. They were divided into two pools of four, the first two of each pools admitted to semifinals, the last relegated to the secondo division

=== Pool A ===
Qualified for Semifinals
Relegated

Place	Team	Games				Points			Table points
Place	Team	played	won	drawn	lost	for	against	diff.	Table points
1	Tucumàn	3	3	0	0	101	60	41	6
2	Córdoba	3	1	1	1	90	64	26	3
3	Entre Rios	3	1	1	1	42	53	-11	3
4	Santiago del estero	3	0	0	3	42	98	-56	0'

=== Pool B ===
Qualified for Semifinals
Relegated

Place	Team	Games				Points			Table points
Place	Team	played	won	drawn	lost	for	against	diff.	Table points
1	Rosario	3	3	0	0	0	0	0	6
2	Cuyo	3	2	0	1	0	0	0	4
3	Buenos Aires	3	1	0	2	0	0	0	2
4	San Juan	3	0	0	3	0	0	0	0

== Semifinals ==
28 October 1989

Tucumàn	32-15	Cuyo

C.A. Mitre, Santiago del estero

28 October 1989

Rosario	18-17	Córdoba

C.A. Mitre, Santiago del estero

== 3rd place final ==
29 October 1989

Córdoba	30 - 13	Cuyo

C.A. Mitre, Santiago del estero

== Final ==
29 October 1989

Tucumàn	12-3	Rosario
Pen: Mesón 4		Pen: Del Castillo

C.A. Mitre, Santiago del estero
Referee: Lindsay McLachlan (New Zealand)

Tucumàn 15. F. Williams, 14. J. Soler, 13. J. Gianotti, 12. S. Mesón, 11. G. Terán, 10. R. Sauze, 9. P. Merlo (capt.), 8. J. Santamarina, 7. S. Bunader, 6. P. Garretón, 5. O. Fascioli (Macome 77'), 4. P. Buabse, 3. L. Molina (R. Paz Posse 57'), 2. S. Paz Posse, 1. R. Hortas.
Rosario: 15. Del Castillo, 14. Sarrabayrousse, 13. Paván, 12. Romero Acuña, 11. García, 10. Ansaldi, 9. Crexell, 8.P. Baraldi, 7. Schnaider, 6. Pérez, 5. Minoldo (Rossi), 4. Discaciatti (capt.), 3. Céspedes, 2. M. Baraldi, 1. Mansilla.

- Champion: Tucumán
- Relegated: San Juan and Santiago del estero

== "Classificacion" Tournament ==
Teams are divided in two pools: the winners of each, promoted to "Campeonato" tournament.

=== Pool "C" ===
Place	Team	Games				Points			Table points
Place	Team	played	won	drawn	lost	for	against	diff.	Table points
1	Mar del Plata	4	4	0	0	257	18	+239	8
2	Sur	4	3	0	1	73	0	6	
3	Alto Valle	4	2	0	2	122	77	+45	4
4	Austral	4	1	0	3	25	146	-121	2
5	Chubut	4	0	0	4	12	241	0	0

Promoted: Mar del Plata

=== Pool "D" ===
Place	Team	Games				Points			Table points
Place	Team	played	won	drawn	lost	for	against	diff.	Table points
1	Santa Fè	4	4	0	0	268	28	+240	8
2	Noreste	4	2	0	1	94	29	+65	4
3	Salta	4	2	0	1	122	77	+45	4
4	Misiones	4	1	0	3	25	146	-121	2
5	Jujuy	4	0	0	4	12	241	-229	0

The match between Noreste and Misiones wasn't played.

Promoted: Santa Fè
