= 1949 Campeonato Argentino de Rugby =

5° Campeonato Argentino
- Countries: Argentina
- Champions: Provincia (4th title)
- Runners-up: Capital

The 1949 Campeonato Argentino de Rugby was won by the selection della Buenos Aires Province, ("Provincia") that beat in the final the selection of Capital.

== Rugby Union in Argentina in 1949 ==
- The France XV visited Argentina playing ad winning nine match, two of them against the Argentina national team.
- The "Championship of Buenos Aires" was shared by Club Atlético San Isidro and Club Universitario de Buenos Aires
- The "Cordoba Province Championship" was won by Jockey Club Córdoba
- The North-East Championship was won by Natación y Gimnasia

== Results ==
The tournament was played in July, with all the matches played at Club Atlético San Isidro in Buenos Aires, to permit to the selection committee of national team to have an easy look at all the players in order to form the team to play against France in the incoming tour

Quarter-finals
17 July
Capital	22
Norte	3
17 July
Provincia	49
Cuyo	6

Semi-finals
24 July
Capital	12
Litoral	3
24 July
Provincia	14
Estudiantes Paranà	6

Final
31 July
Provincia	16
Capital	12

== Bibliography ==
- (in Spanish) Memorias de la UAR 1949
- (in Spanish) V Campeonato Argentino
