= 1946 Campeonato Argentino de Rugby =

2° Campeonato Argentino
- Countries: Argentina
- Number of teams: 8
- Champions: Provincia (2nd title)

The 1946 Campeonato Argentino de Rugby was won by the selection della Buenos Aires Province ("Provincia") that beat in the final the selection of Capital.

== Rugby Union in Argentina in 1946 ==
- The "Championship of Buenos Aires" was won by Club Pucará
- The "Cordoba Province Championship" was won by Jockey Club Córdoba
- The North-East Championship was won by Universitario

== Results ==
QUARTERS OF FINALS
15 sept.	Estudiantes Paranà	-	Capital	0 - 8	Paranà
16 sept.	Cuyo	-	Provincia	0 - 65	Mendoza
15 sept.	UR del Norte	-	Córdoba	5 - 3	Tucumán
15 sept.	Montevideo Cricket Club	-	Litoral	0 - 15	Maldonado, Buenos Aires

,

SEMIFINALS
22 sept.	Capital	-	Litoral	19 - 0	Maldonado, Buenos Aires
22 sept.	Provincia	-	Córdoba	25 - 0	Maldonado, Buenos Aires

=== Final ===
29 September 1946

Provincia	9-6	Capital

Maldonado, Buenos Aires
Referee: Manuel F. Mantilla.

Capital: A. Ozores (GEBA) (cap)., T. C. Sacca (Belgrano), R. D. H. Brown (Belgrano), J.Sansot (C.U.B.A.), y A. Fernández Moores (C.U.B.A.), E. Monpelat (C.U.B.A.), E. Holmberg (C.U.B.A., L. M. Bertani (GEBA), R. MacKay (GEBA), E. Lucotti (Belgrano), H.Ponce (GEBA), C. B: Ardió (C.U.B.A.), F. Elizalde (C.U.B.A.), H. Achával (C.U.B.A.), R.Lucotti (Belgrano)
Provincia R. Frigerio (Pucará), V. Bereciartúa (Pucará), A. Palma (Pucará), J. C. de Pablo (Pucará), H. Castro Feijóo (C.A.S.I.), R. E. Giles (Pucará), G. Ehrmann (Pucará), E. Fonseca (Pucará), J. Sarandón (S.I.C.), B. Grigolón (Hindú), A. González Bonorino (Olivos), J. Morganti (C.A.San Isidro), E. Daulte (Olivos), J. Bastiani (Hindú) cap., A. Gutiérrez (Hindú)

== Bibliography ==
- (in Spanish) Memorias de la UAR 1946
- (in Spanish) II Campeonato Argentino
