= 1955 Campeonato Argentino de Rugby =

11° Campeonato Argentino
- Countries: Argentina
- Champions: Capital (3rd title)
- Runners-up: Provincia

The 1955 Campeonato Argentino de Rugby was won by the selection of Capital that beat in the final the selection of Buenos Aires Province ("Provincia").

== Rugby Union in Argentina in 1955 ==
- The "Buenos Aires Championship" was won by Club Atlético San Isidro
- The "Cordoba Province Championship" was won by Córdoba Athletic Club
- The "North-East Championship" was won by Natación y Gimnasia

== Knock out stages ==
The championship suffer a lot of trouble due to the political situazion in the country with the deposing of Juan Domingo Perón during the Revolución Libertadora.

The selection of Río Paranà didn't participate and the selection of San Juan withdraws from Quarters of finals after the delay of the match scheduled for 19 September, refusing to play on 2 October.

PRELIMINARY
11 September	Mar del Plata	-	Rio Cuarto	9 - 6	Mar del Plata
11 September	Cuyo	-	Rosario	6 - 21	Rosario

QUARTERS OF FINALS
2 October	Mar del Plata	-	Provincia	0 - 50	Mar del Plata
2 October	UR del Norte	-	San Juan	3 - 0	(withdraw)
2 October	Rosario	-	Capital	6 - 23	Rosario
2 October	La Plata	-	UR del centro del Pais	14 - 3	C.A.S.I., Buenos Aires

SEMIFINALS
9 October	Capital	-	UR del Norte	11 - 3	C.A.S.I., Buenos Aires
9 October	Provincia	-	La Plata	31 - 11	Gymn. y Esgr., Buenos Aires

== Final ==
16 October 1955

Capital	6-3	Provincia

CASI, Buenos Aires
Referee: Carlos M. Seminario

== Bibliography ==
- (in Spanish) Memorias de la UAR 1955
- (in Spanish) XI Campeonato Argentino
