= 1965 Campeonato Argentino de Rugby =

Campeonato Argentino 1965
- Countries: Argentina
- Number of teams: 12
- Champions: Rosario (1st title)
- Runners-up: Buenos Aires

The 1965 Campeonato Argentino de Rugby was won by then selection of the Unión de Rugby de Rosario that beat in the final the selection of URBA (Buenos Aires)

After some years the tournament returned to a knock-out format.

== That year in Argentina rugby union ==
=== National ===
- The Buenos Aires Championship was won by C.U.B.A.
- The Cordoba Province Championship was won by La Tablada
- The North-East Championship was won by Uni Tucuman

=== International ===
- It was the year of historical tour in South Africa and Rhodesia with the historical victory against Junior Springboks, of the Tests against Section Paloise and the Oxford e Cambridge selection tour.

== Knock Out Phases ==
Preliminary
1 August	Sur	-	Rio Negro y Neuquén	3 - 11	Bahía Blanca
1 August	San Juan	-	Cuyo	3 - 15	San Juan
1 August	Noreste	-	Santa Fe	3 - 17	Resistencia
1 August	Valle de Lerma	-	UR del Norte	0 - 28	Salta

Quarter Finals
17 August	Rio Negro y Neuquén	-	Mar del Plata	6 - 9	General Roca
17 August	Cuyo	-	Buenos Aires	8 - 34	Mendoza
17 August	Santa Fe	-	Rosario	0 - 11	Rosario
17 August	UR del Norte	-	Córdoba	0 - 6	Tucumán

=== Semifinals ===
5 September 1965

Mar del Plata	11-21	Buenos Aires
Try: Arroyo; Con: Casanelli; Pen: Casanelli 2		Try: Poggi, McCormick; Gradín, Neri; Con: Poggi 2, Cazenave; Pen: Cazenave

Mar del Plata
Referee: Enzo Bordabehere (Rosario)

Mar del Plata:M. Casanelli, G. Beverino, A. Omaña, E. Corbacho, R. Fruzcaldo, C. Alonso, H. Tiribelli, E. Ferrari (cap.), J. De la Garma, J. Cabarcos, C. Olivera, N. Cerviño, 0. Arroyo, C. Losada, J. Casanegra.
Buenos Aires; L. Cazenave, M. Pascual, E. Poggi, A. Rodríguez Jurado, C. Cornille, M. Beccar Varela, L. Gradín, L. García Yáñez, H. Silva, E. Neri, G. Illía, B. Otaño (cap.), G. McCormick, N. González del Solar, R. Foster.

19 September 1965

Rosario	22-11	Cordoba
Try: Benzi, Ferraza; Quetglas; Con: J. Seaton 2 Pen: J. Seaton 2 Drop: J. Seaton		Try: Ramírez; Con: Paz; Pen: Paz

Plaza Jewell, Rosario
Referee: Blas Cosentino (Tucuman)

Rosario J. Seaton, E. España (capitán), J. Benzi, E. Ferraza, E. Quetglas, J. Caballero, O. Aletta de Sylva, J. Cortante, J. Imhoff, M Pavan, M. Bouza, M. Chesta, R. Esmendi, R. Seaton, J. Gómez Kenny
Cordoba: E. Rodríguez, A. Quetglas, E. Meta, J. Ramírez, R. Faya, G. Piuma, J. Del Valle, R. Loyola, J. Masjoán, P. Demo, J. Taleb, J. Imas (capitán), G. Ribera, A. Paz, J. Coceo.

== Final ==
3 October 1965

Buenos Aires	6-8	Rosario
Try: Cazenave, Pascual		Try: Quetglas,. España; Con: J. Seaton

San Isidro Club, Buenos Aires
Referee: Manuel Peralta Ramírez (Cordoba)

Buenos Aires : B. Morgan, C. Cornille, A. Pagano, M. Pascual, R. Trotta, R. Cazenave, A. Etchegaray, E. Scharenberg, L. García Yáñez, L. Gradín, B. Otaño (capitán), A. Anthony, G. McCormick, N. González del Solar, R. Foster.
Rosario: J. Seaton, E. España (capitán), J. Benzi, E. Ferraza, E. Quetglas, J. Scilabra, C. Cristie, J. Imhoff, L. Robin, M. Paván, M. Chesta, M. Bouza, J. Gómez Kenny, R. Seaton. R. Esmendi.
