= 2009 Campeonato Argentino de Rugby =

65° Campeonato Argentino de Mayores
- Number of teams: 24
- Champions: Córdoba (5th title)
- Runners-up: Tucumàn

The 2009 Campeonato Argentino de Rugby was won by the selection of Cordoba that beat in the final the selection of Tucumàn

== That year in Argentine rugby ==
- Argentina and England played two test in June. English won at Manchester (37-15), but "Pumas" won (24-22) in Salta.
- The "A" national team, played a lot of matches. First beat two time Namibia in tour, then won as usual the Southamerican Championship and participated also to the Churchill Cup, were finished at third place.
- In November the "A" team, won 2 volte with Uruguay at home, then started for a Tour in Europe were played against Georgia (lost 22-24), Portugal (won 24-13) and Ireland "A" (lost 31-0)
- In November the "Pumas", visited Great Britain losing against England (6-19), Wales (16-33) and winning with Scotland (9-6)

== "Campeonato" ==
=== Pool 1 ===
1.Round
7 March	Buenos Aires	-	Santa Fe	26 - 6	Buenos Aires
7 March	Córdoba	-	San Juan	54 - 6	Córdoba

2.Round
14 March	San Juan	-	Buenos Aires	3 - 46	San Juan
14 March	Córdoba	-	Santa Fe	24 - 13	Córdoba

3.Round
21 March	Buenos Aires	-	Córdoba	13 - 15	Buenos Aires
21 March	Santa Fe	-	San Juan	19 - 8	Santa Fe

Qualified for Semifinals
to relegation play-out

Place	Team	Games				Points			Bonus	Table points
Place	Team	played	won	drawn	lost	for	against	diff.	Bonus	Table points
1	Cordoba	3	3	0	0	93	32	+61	1	13
2	Buenos Aires	3	2	0	1	85	24	+61	2	10
3	Santa Fè	3	1	0	2	38	58	-20	0	6
4	Noreste	3	0	0	3	17	119	-102	0	0

=== Pool 2 ===
1.Round
7 March	Tucumán	-	Cuyo	32 - 19	Tucumán
7 March	Rosario	-	Salta	20 - 32	Rosario

2.Round
14 March	Salta	-	Tucumán	19 - 29	Salta
14 March	Rosario	-	Cuyo	30 - 25	Rosario

3.Round
21 March	Tucumán	-	Rosario	34 - 30	Tucumán
21 March	Cuyo	-	Salta	18 - 11	Mendoza

Qualified for Semifinals
to relegation play-out

Place	Team	Games				Points			Bonus	Table points
Place	Team	played	won	drawn	lost	for	against	diff.	Bonus	Table points
1	Tucumàn	3	3	0	0	95	68	+27	2	14
2	Salta	3	1	0	2	62	67	-5	1	5
3	Rosario	3	1	0	2	80	71	+9	1	5
4	Cuyo	3	1	0	2	42	73	-31	0	4

=== Semifinals ===
Semifinals
28 March	Córdoba	-	Salta	23 - 16	Córdoba
28 March	Tucumán	-	Buenos Aires	20 - 10	Tucumán

=== Final ===
Final
4 April	Córdoba	-	Tucumán	15 - 12	Córdoba

=== Play Out ===
Pay Out ("Finale Descenso")
28 March	San Juan	-	Cuyo	25 - 22	San Juan
4 April	Cuyo	-	San Juan	21 - 16	Salta

- Champions: Córdoba
- Relegated : San Juan

== "Ascenso" ==
=== Pool "North 1" ===
1.Round
28 February	Santiago	-	Jujuy	37 - 10	Santiago del Estero
28 February	San Luis	-	La Rioja	10 - 19	San Luis

2.Round
7 March	La Rioja	-	Santiago	17 - 59	La Rioja
7 March	San Luis	-	Jujuy	29 - 38	San Luis

3.Round
14 March	Santiago	-	San Luis	124 - 0	Santiago del Estero
14 March	Jujuy	-	La Rioja	15 - 7	S. Salvador de J.

Qualified for Semifinals

Place	Team	Games				Points			Bonus	Table points
Place	Team	played	won	drawn	lost	for	against	diff.	Bonus	Table points
1	Santiago	3	3	0	0	220	27	+193	3	15
2	Jujuy	3	2	0	1	63	73	-10	1	9
3	La Rioja	3	1	0	2	43	74	-29	1	5
4	San Luis	3	0	0	3	29	181	-162	1	1

=== Pool North 2 ===
1.Round
28 February	Noreste	-	Misiones	36 - 7	Resistencia
28 February	Entre Rios	-	Formosa	36 - 0	Paraná

2.Round
7 March	Formosa	-	Noreste	15 - 47	Formosa
7 March	Entre Rios	-	Misiones	54 - 10	Paraná

3.Round
14 March	Noreste	-	Entre Rios	20 - 5	Resistencia
14 March	Misiones	-	Formosa	18 - 12	Misiones

Qualified for Semifinals

Place	Team	Games				Points			Bonus	Table points
Place	Team	played	won	drawn	lost	for	against	diff.	Bonus	Table points
1	Noreste	3	3	0	0	99	37	+62	2	14
2	Entre Rios	3	2	0	1	105	30	+75	2	10
3	Misiones	3	1	0	2	35	68	-63	0	4
4	Formosa	3	0	0	3	27	101	-74	1	1

=== Pool South 1 ===
1.Round
28 February	Mar del Plata	-	Sur	8 - 30	Mar del Plata
28 February	Alto Valle	-	Oeste	73 - 5	Neuquén

2.Round
7 March	Oeste	-	Mar del Plata	0 - 73	Junín
7 March	Alto Valle	-	Sur	24 - 15	Neuquén

3.Round
14 March	Mar del Plata	-	Alto Valle	35 - 18	Mar del Plata
14 March	Sur	-	Oeste	61 - 10	Bahía Blanca

Qualified for Semifinals

Place	Team	Games				Points			Bonus	Table points
Place	Team	played	won	drawn	lost	for	against	diff.	Bonus	Table points
1	Sur	3	2	0	1	115	33	+82	2	10
2	Mar del Plata	3	2	0	1	116	48	+68	2	10
3	Alto Valle	3	2	0	1	106	64	+42	1	9
4	Oeste	3	0	0	3	15	207	-192	0	0

=== Pool South 2 ===
1.Round
28 February	Austral	-	Lagos del Sur	36 - 7	Comodoro Rivadavia
28 February	Chubut	-	Tierra del Fuego	36 - 11	Trelew

2.Round
7 March	Tierra del Fuego	-	Austral	5 - 25	Ushuaia
7 March	Chubut	-	Lagos del Sur	50 - 0	Trelew

3.Round
14 March	Austral	-	Cubut	22 - 10	Comodoro Rivadavia
14 March	Lagos del Sur	-	Tierra del Fuego	14 - 27	Bariloche

Qualified for Semifinals

Place	Team	Games				Points			Bonus	Table points
Place	Team	played	won	drawn	lost	for	against	diff.	Bonus	Table points
1	Austral	3	3	0	0	83	22	+61	2	14
2	Chubut	3	2	0	1	96	33	+63	2	10
3	Tierra del Fuego	3	1	0	2	40	78	-38	0	4
4	Lagos del Sur	3	0	0	3	24	110	-86	0	0

=== Semifinals ===
Semifinals
21 March	Santiago	-	Noreste	17 - 20	Santiago del Estero
21 March	Sur	-	Austral	36 - 20	Bahía Blanca

=== Final ===
Final
28 March	Sur	-	Noreste	45 - 18	Bahía Blanca
4 April	Noreste	-	Sur	32 - 0	Resistencia

- promoted : Noreste (won on aggregate 48-45)
