= 1995 Campeonato Argentino de Rugby =

Rugby union competition season

51st Campeonato Argentino
- Champions: Cordoba (1st title)
- Runners-up: Tucumàn

The 1995 Campeonato Argentino de Rugby was won by selection of Cordoba that beat in the final the selection of Tucumàn The 20 teams (but only 18 played) were divided on 3 levels : "Campeonato", "Ascenso", "Clasificacion". Due to the incoming reduction to 6 teams in the higher level, the winner of the two pools of di "Ascenso" played a play-out for admission to "Campeonato" against the third of the higher levels.

== Rugby union in Argentina in 1995 ==
=== National ===
- The "Campeonato Argentino Menores de 21" (Under 21 championship) was won by Tucumàn
- The "National Championship for clubs" was won by Club Atlético San Isidro that beating in the final La Plata
- The "Torneo de la URBA" (Buenos Aires) was won by La Plata
- The "Cordoba Province Championship" was won by Tala
- The North-East Championship was won by Nat. y Gimnasia and Tucumán RC

=== International ===
- In order to prepare the 1995 Rugby World Cup, the Pumas went to Australia, were lost heavily both test match
- At the World Cup Argentina lost all the matches against England, Samoa and Italy.
- As usual, Argentina won the 1995 South American Rugby Championship
- Argentina won also the first edition of Pan American Championship

== "Campeonato" ==
The 8 teams were divided in two pools

=== Pool "A" ===
	TUC	BA	CUY	MdP
Tucumàn	––––	21-20	33-18	60-34
Buenos Aires	20-21	––––	31-25	42-10
Cuyo	18-33	25-31	––––	58-16
Mar del Plata	34-60	10-42	16-58	––––

Squadra	G	V	N	P	P+	P-	diff.	Pt
Tucumàn	3	3	0	0	114	72	42	6
Buenos Aires	3	2	0	1	93	56	37	4
Cuyo	3	1	0	2	101	80	21	2
Mar del Plata	3	0	0	3	60	160	-100	0

Qualification: Tucumàn and Buenos Aires
to Play-out: Cuyo
Relegated: Mar del Plata

=== Pool "B" ===
	0	0	0	0
Cordoba	––––	28-23	70-11	38-15
Rosario	23-28	––––	61-29	40-37
San Juan	11-70	29-61	––––	18-9
Noroeste	15-38	37-40	9-18	––––

Squadra	G	V	N	P	P+	P-	diff.	Pt
Cordoba	3	3	0	0	136	49	87	6
Rosario	3	2	0	1	124	94	30	4
San Juan	3	1	0	2	58	140	-82	2
Noroeste	3	0	0	3	61	96	-35	0

Qualificate: Cordoba and Rosario
Ai Play-out: San Juan
Relegated: Noroeste

SEMIFINALS (10 November 1995): Cordoba / - / Buenos Aires / 39-21; Rosario / - / Tucumàn / 35-36

3rd place final (12 November 1995): Buenos Aires / - / Rosario / 37-27

Final (12 November 1995): Cordoba / - / Tucumàn / 28-24

== Play Out ==
The winner of this play out between the third of each pool of "Campeonato" and the winner of "Ascenso" will be admitted to the 1996 "Campeonato"

(11 November 1995), Entre Rios / - / San Juan / 16-18; Santa Fè / - / Cuyo / 12-16

- San Juan and Cuyo admitted to 1996 "Campeonato"
- Entre Rios and Santa Fè relegated

== "Ascenso" ==
=== Pool "A" ===
	SFE	SUR	A-V	CEN
Santa Fè	––––	14-13	53-20	68-18
Sur	13-14	––––	16-13	?-?
Alta Valle	20-53	13-16	––––	73-25
Centro	18-68	?-?	25-73	––––

Squadra	G	V	N	P	P+	P-	diff.	Pt
Santa Fè	3	3	0	0	135	51	84	6
Sur	3	2	0	1	29	27	2	4
Alta Valle	3	1	0	2	106	94	12	2
Centro	3	0	0	3	43	141	-98	0

To Play-out: Santa Fè
Relegated: Centro

=== Pool "B" ===
	E-R	SAL	STG	MIS
Entre Rios	––––	20-14	30-25	63-6
Salta	14-20	––––	37-21	58-36
Santiago	25-30	21-37	––––	74-14
Misiones	6-63	36-58	14-74	––––

Squadra	G	V	N	P	P+	P-	diff.	Pt
Entre Rios	3	3	0	0	113	45	68	6
Salta	3	2	0	1	109	77	32	4
Santiago	3	1	0	2	120	81	39	2
Misiones	3	0	0	3	56	195	-139	0

Ai Play-out: Entre Rios
Relegated: Misiones

== "Clasificacion" ==
9 September: Austral / - / Chubut / 13-20
