= 1951 Campeonato Argentino de Rugby =

7° Campeonato Argentino
- Countries: Argentina
- Champions: Provincia (6th title)
- Runners-up: Capital

The 1951 Campeonato Argentino de Rugby was won by the selection of Buenos Aires Province ("Provincia") that beat in the final the selection of Capital

== Rugby Union in Argentina in 1951 ==
=== National ===
- The "Championship of Buenos Aires" was shared by Club Universitario de Buenos Aires
- The "Cordoba Province Championship" was won by Jockey Club Córdoba
- The North-East Championship was shared by Universitario and Tucumán Rugby Club

=== International ===
- In November the Unión de Rugby del Río de la Plata (as was called before) change their name in "Unión Argentina de Rugby", as requested by the Argentina Olympic Committee .
- In September, was played the "Torneo Internacional ABCU", originally think as part of 1951 Pan American Games, played in February. But was no possible to arrange a tournament of rugby for those games, so it was arranged in September. The name "ABCU" was formed by the initial of nations participating. After the 1958 edition, this tournament was recognized as the first edition of the competition.

== Tabellone ==
Quarter-finals
19 August
Litoral	3
UR Centro	22
19 August
Río Paranà	3
La Plata	22

Semi-finals
26 August
Provincia	9
UR Centro	6
26 August
La Plata	3
Capital	8

Final
26 August
Provincia	14
Capital	5

== Knock out stages ==
QUARTERS OF FINALS
19 August	Litoral	-	UR del centro del Pais	3 - 22	Rosario
19 August	Río Paranà	-	La Plata	3 - 22	Paranà

SEMIFINALS
26 August	Capital	-	La Plata	8 - 3	Gim.y Esg., Buenos Aires
26 August	Provincia	-	UR del centro del Pais	9 - 6	Gim.y Esg., Buenos Aires

== Final ==
2 September 1951

Provincia	16-5	Capital

Estadio G.E.B.A., Buenos Aires

Provincia : H. Solveyra, E. Caffarone, A. Palma, J. L. Guidi, C. Arana, R. Giles, G. Ehrman, L. Allen, M. Sarandón, R. Ochoa, J. S. Morganti (Cap.), E. Domínguez, R. Follet, C. Swain, C. Travaglini.
Capital: M. A. Miguel Villar, D. Evans, E. Fernández del Casal, R. Bazán, K. Green, I. Comas, P. Felisari, C. Bertolotto, H. Fiorioli, J. O'Farrell, J. Piccardo, C. Morea, M. Lanusse, F. Erazun, R. Pont Lezica.

== Bibliography ==
- (in Spanish) Memorias de la UAR 1951
- (in Spanish) VII Campeonato Argentino
