= 1980 Campeonato Argentino de Rugby =

Rugby union competition in Argentina

- Number of teams: 16
- Champions: Buenos Aires (18th title)
- Runners-up: Córdoba

The 1980 Campeonato Argentino de Rugby was the 34th. edition of Campeonato Argentino, a rugby union competition contested by provincial teams in Argentina. It was held from 20 September to 12 October 1980.

The final stages were held in Unión de Rugby del Alto Valle de Río Negro y Neuquén for the first time in the history of the competition, with Marabunta Rugby Club field in Cipolletti as host venue. This edition saw also the debut of Unión Entrerriana that had been established the previous year.

The championship was won by the representative side of Buenos Aires that defeated the Córdoba provincial team 56–3 in the final, achieving their 18th. title.

== Rugby Union in Argentina in 1980 ==
=== National ===
- The Buenos Aires Championship was won by San Isidro Club
- The Cordoba Province Championship was won by Tala
- The North-East Championship was won by Lawn Tennis
- The selection of Buenos Aires won also the "Campeonato Juvenil" (under-19)

=== International ===
- In April 1980 the selection del Sudamérica XV in April went to South Africa.
- In October, the Springboks were in South America, but no matches were allowed by Argentina government, so the matches was played in Chile, Uruguay and Paraguay.
- In November, Fiji visited Argentina on tour.

== Preliminaries ==
=== Zone 1 ===
1st round
28 June	Noreste	-	Buenos Aires	4 - 83	Resistencia
1 September	Jujuy	-	Tucumán	12 - 45	Resistencia

2nd round
2 September	Buenos Aires	-	Tucumán	22 - 14	Resistencia

=== Zone 2 ===
1st round
20 September	Cuyo	-	Tandil	3 - 0	El Challeo, (withdraw)
20 September	San Juan	-	Chubut	16 - 12	El Challeo, Mendoza

2nd round
21 September	Cuyo	-	San Juan	31 - 15	El Challeo, Mendoza

=== Zone 3 ===
1st round
27 September	Salta	-	Entre Rios	20 - 30	Salta
27 September	Rosario	-	Santa Fe	25 - 16	Salta

2nd round
28 September	Entre Rios	-	Rosario	42 - 12	Salta

=== Zone 4 ===
1st round
27 September	Mar del Plata	-	Austral	20 - 4	Club Nautico, Santa Fe
27 September	Córdoba	-	Sur	26 - 9	Club Nautico, Santa Fe

2nd round
28 September	Mar del Plata	-	Córdoba	9 - 15	Club Nautico, Santa Fe

== Interzone ==
INTERZONE
28 September	Cuyo	-	Buenos Aires	15 - 21	Maristas, Mendoza

== Semifinals ==
11 October 1980

Buenos Aires	46--19	Rosario

Referee: Felipe Ferrari ( Buenos Aires)

11 October 1980

Rio Negro y Neuquén	14-38	Córdoba

Referee: Ricardo Colombo ( Buenos Aires)

== Third place final ==
12 October 1980

Rosario	78–9	Rio Negro y Neuquén

Referee: Felipe Ferrari ( Buenos Aires)

== Final ==
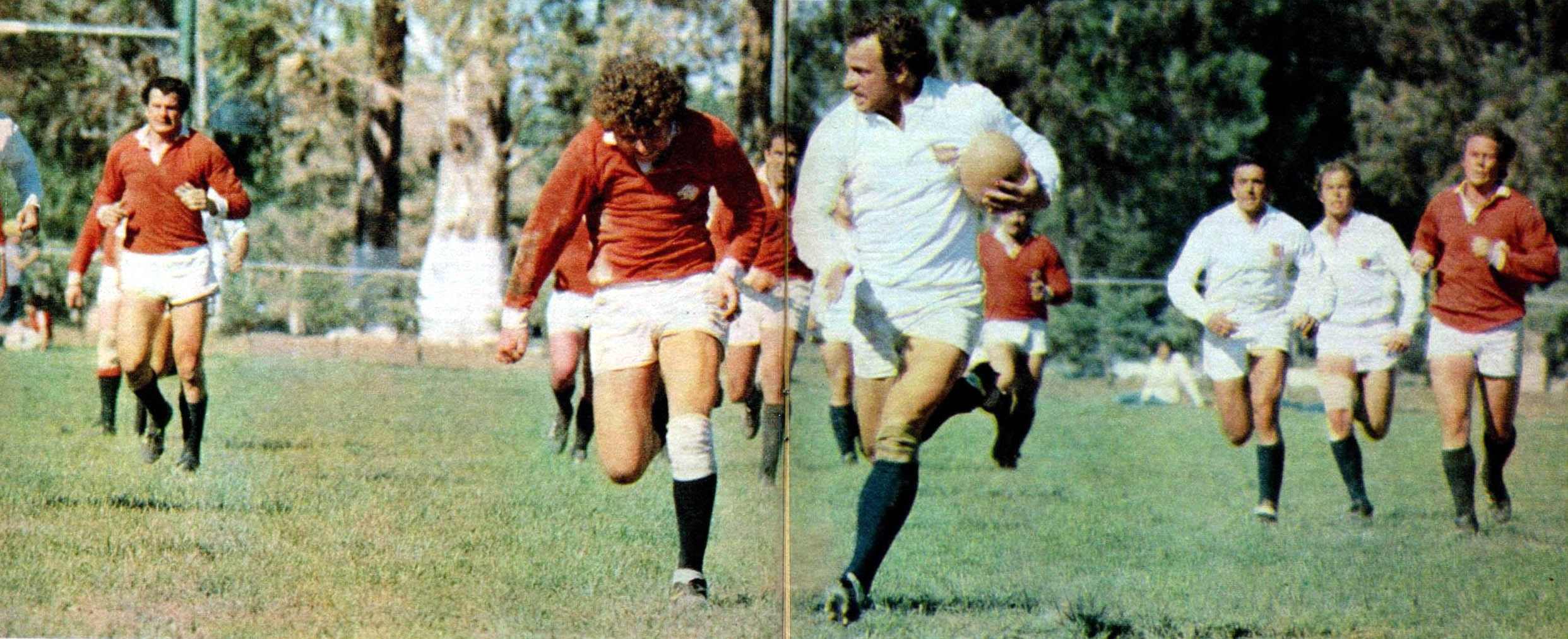
A moment of the final: Adolfo Cappelletti running to score a try

12 October 1980

Buenos Aires	56–3	Córdoba
Try: Madero 3'; Travaglini 17'; Cappelletti 25', 32'; Iachetti 30', 36'; Puccio 39'; Con: Porta 3', 17', 25', 32', 36', 39'		Pen: Virgolini 14'

Marabunta RC Field, Cipolletti
Referee: Ricardo Colombo
(Buenos Aires)

Team details

Buenos Aires	Córdoba

Marcelo Campo	FB	15	FB	M. Villarino
Adolfo Cappelletti	W	14	W	D. Grecco
Marcelo Loffreda	C	13	C	J. Cannote
Rafael Madero	C	12	C	N. Albrisi (c)
Alejandro Puccio	W	11	W	N. Ambrogio
Hugo Porta (c)	FH	10	FH	R. Virgolini
Tomás Landajo	SH	9	SH	M. Ferrara
Tomás Petersen	N8	8	N8	M. Martínez
Alejandro Travaglini	F	6	F	R. Boroch
Carlos Serrano	F	7	F	J. Aguad (substituted off)
Ernesto Ure	L	5	L	R. Lobato
Alejandro Iachetti	L	4	L	D. Praddaude
Tobías Sainz-Trápaga	P	3	P	E. Rodríguez
Alejandro Cubelli	H	2	H	J. Albrisí
Fernando Morel	P	1	P	A. Cravero
		Substitutions
			C	Gastoldi (substituted on)

== Bibliography ==
- Francesco Volpe, Paolo Pacitti (Author), Rugby 2000, GTE Gruppo Editorale (1999) (in Italian)
