= 1992 Campeonato Argentino de Rugby =

Rugby tournament

48° Campeonato Argentino
- Countries: Argentina
- Number of teams: 19
- Champions: Tucumàn (6th title)
- Runners-up: Córdoba

The 1992 Campeonato Argentino de Rugby was won by the Tucumàn who gained their title after the defeat of Córdoba. The 19 teams were divided in the championship; "Campeonato", "Ascenso", "Classificacion".

== That year in Argentine rugby ==
=== National ===
- The "Campeonato Juvenil" (Under 19 championship) was won by Buenos Aires
- The "Torneo de la URBA" (Buenos Aires) was won by Asociación Alumni
- The "Cordoba Province Championship" was won by Córdoba Athletic Club
- The North-East Championship was won by Tucumán Rugby Club

=== International ===
- France rugby union team toured Argentina in Argentina. France won both the official test match against the Pumas.
- The "Pumas" toured Europe in October and November, and won all three test-matches played, against Spain., Romania and France

== "Campeonato" tournament ==
The better eight teams played for title. They were divided in two pools of four, the first two from each pools admitted to semifinals, the last relegated in secondo division

=== Pool "A" ===
Pos	Team	Pld	W	D	L	PF	PA	PD	Pts	Qualification or relegation	Tuc	Cuy	B-A	SFè
1	Tucumàn	3	3	0	0	99	57	+42	6	Qualified for Semifinals		37–23	28–22	34–12
2	Cuyo	3	2	0	1	92	67	+25	4	Qualified for Semifinals	23–37		39–17	30–13
3	Buenos Aires	3	1	0	2	105	89	+16	2		22–28	17–39		66–22
4	Santa Fè	3	0	0	3	47	130	−83	0	Relegated	12–34	13–30	22–66	

=== Pool "B" ===
Pos	Team	Pld	W	D	L	PF	PA	PD	Pts	Qualification or relegation	Cba	Ros	S-J	E-R
1	Córdoba	3	3	0	0	121	49	+72	6	Qualified for Semifinals		30–26	58–10	33–13
2	Rosario	3	2	0	1	218	86	+132	4	Qualified for Semifinals	26–30		74–17	118–39
3	San Juan	3	1	0	2	37	138	−101	2		10–58	17–74		10–6
4	Entre Rios	3	0	0	3	58	161	−103	0	Relegated	13–33	39–118	6–10	

Relegated: Entre Rios

=== Semifinals ===
31 October 1992

Córdoba	43-12	Cuyo

Aranduroga RC, Corrientes

31 October 1992

Tucumàn	37-30	Rosario

Aranduroga RC, Corrientes

=== Third place final ===
1 November 1992

Cuyo	28-24	Rosario

Aranduroga RC, Corrientes

=== Final ===
1 November 1992

Tucumàn	16-11	Córdoba

Aranduroga RC, Corrientes

== "Ascenso" Tournament ==
=== Pool C ===
Pos	Team	Pld	W	D	L	PF	PA	PD	Pts	Promotion or relegation	MdP	Sur	A-V	Cnt
1	Mar del Plata	3	3	0	0	121	49	+72	6	Promoted		21–10	52–22	99–0
2	Sur	3	2	0	1	218	86	+132	4		10–21		30–23	93–3
3	Alta Valle	3	1	0	2	37	138	−101	2		22–52	23–30		47–7
4	Centro	3	0	0	3	58	161	−103	0	Relegated	0–99	3–93	7–47	

=== Pool D ===
Pos	Team	Pld	W	D	L	PF	PA	PD	Pts	Promotion or relegation	NOE	SAL	STG	MIS
1	Noroeste	3	3	0	0	82	41	+41	6	Promoted		27–20	28–7	27–14
2	Salta	3	1	0	2	120	57	+63	2 (Note: Salta classified second for better point difference in direct matches against Samtiago and Msiones)		20–27		12–13	88–17
3	Santiago	3	1	0	2	37	72	−35	2		7–28	13–12		17–32
4	Misiones	3	1	0	2	63	132	−69	2	Relegated	14–27	17–88	32–17	

== "Classification" Tournament ==
Pos	Team	Pld	W	D	L	PF	PA	PD	Pts	Promotion	CHU	AUS	OES
1	Chubut	3	3	0	0	76	29	+47	6	Promoted		44–5	32–24
2	Austral	3	1	0	2	34	68	−34	2		5–44		29–24
3	Oeste	2	0	0	2	48	61	−13	0		24–32	24–29	
