= 1956 Campeonato Argentino de Rugby =

12° Campeonato Argentino
- Countries: Argentina
- Champions: Provincia (9th title)
- Runners-up: La Plata

The 1956 Campeonato Argentino de Rugby was won by the selection of Buenos Aires Province ("Provincia") that beat in the final the selection of La Plata.

Twelve team participated, because the club of Santa Fè Province left the Unión de Rugby del Río Paranà founding the Unión santafesina de rugby. Cause the contemporary Oxford-Cambridge combined tour, "Provincia" and "Capital" selection were directly admitted to semifinals

== Rugby Union in Argentina in 1956 ==
- The Buenos Aires Championship was won by C.A.S.I.
- The Cordoba Province Championship was won by Universitario Cordoba and Jockey Club Córdoba
- The North-East Championship was won by Tucumán RC
- A mixed selection, formed also of many international player of British national team, student at Oxford and Cambridge universities visit Argentina, for the second historical tour, the second after the tours in 1948- The visitors won \0 match on 11, and 2 test on 2 against Argentina.

== Knock out stages ==
1st PRELIMINARY
22 July	UR del centro del Pais	-	Río Paranà	3 - 11	Córdoba
22 July	Rio Cuarto	-	Santa Fe	5 - 3	Rio Cuarto

2nd PRELIMINARY
29 July	Río Paranà	-	Rosario	6 - 10	Paraná
29 July	San Juan	-	UR del Norte	9 - 3	San Juan
29 July	Rio Cuarto	-	La Plata	9 - 14	Rio Cuarto
29 July	Cuyo	-	Mar del Plata	6 - 3	Mendoza

3° PRELIMINARY
19 August	Rosario	-	San Juan	22 - 12	Rosario
26 August	La Plata	-	Cuyo	27 - 6	Buenos Aires

SEMIFINALS
23 sept.	Provincia	-	Rosario	27 - 3	San Isidro, Buenos Aires
23 sept.	Capital	-	La Plata	3 - 6	San Isidro, Buenos Aires

== Final ==
16 October 1956

Provincia	13-9	La Plata
Try: Mitchelstein, Bernacchi, Caffarone, Con: Bernacchi, Comas,		Try: Dupeyron, Suárez; Pen: = Gorostiaga

San Isidro Club, Buenos Aires
Referee: Eric Kember

== Bibliography ==
- (in Spanish) Memorias de la UAR 1956
- (in Spanish) XII Campeonato Argentino
