= 1958 Campeonato Argentino de Rugby =

14° Campeonato Argentino
- Countries: Argentina
- Champions: Capital (5th title)
- Runners-up: Provincia

The Campeonato Argentino de Rugby 1958 was won by the selection of Capital that defeated the selection of Buenos Aires Province ("Provincia"). There were fourteen teams that participated, including two new selections: Valle de Lerma (Salta Province) and Sur.

== Rugby Union in Argentina in 1958 ==
- The Buenos Aires Championship was won by Buenos Aires CRC
- The Cordoba Province Championship was won by Universitario and Jockey Club
- The North-East Championship was won by Universitario Tucumán
- Argentina won the 1958 South American Rugby Championship

== Knock out stages ==
PRELIMINARY
24 August	Córdoba	-	Cuyo	22 - 9	Córdoba
24 August	La Plata	-	Santa Fe	14 - 3	La Plata
24 August	Mar del Plata	-	Sur	21 - 0	Mar del Plata
24 August	San Juan	-	Rio Cuarto	9 - 6	San Juan
24 August	Valle de Lerma	-	UR del Norte	0 - 11	Salta
24 August	Rosario	-	Río Paranà	11 - 3	Rosario

QUARTERS OF FINALS
21 September	Córdoba	-	Capital	8 - 22	Córdoba
21 September	La Plata	-	Mar del Plata	6 - 3	La Plata
21 September	San Juan	-	Provincia	6 - 31	San Juan
21 September	UR del Norte	-	Rosario	23 - 6	Tucumán

SEMIFINALS
28 September	Capital	-	La Plata	19 - 6	San Isidro, Buenos Aires
28 September	Provincia	-	UR del Norte	17 - 6	San Isidro, Buenos Aires

== Final ==
5 October 1958

Capital	11-6	Provincia
Try: Karplus, Ferrer, Con: Méndez, Pen: Méndez		Pen: Comas, Bernacchi

San Isidro, Buenos Aires
Referee: Sr. César de Elizalde

Capital R. Raimundez ('B. A.), C. Lennon (Belgrano), E. Karplus (Pueyrredón), E. Fernández del Casal (C.U.B.A.), J. Ferrer (C.U.B.A.), L. Méndez (O. S.), R. Brown (B. A.), S. Hogg (B. A.), M. Aspiroz (B. A.), C. Álvarez (C.U.B.A.), D. R. Hogg (B.. A.), J. Trebotich (Puey¬rredón), E. Gaviña (C.U.B.A.), C. Ezcurra (C.U.B.A.), E. Verardo (Belgrano).
Provincia: R. Pesce (A. D. F.), O. Bernacchi (Curupaytí), J. Campos S. Fernando), J. L. Guidi (A. D. F.), A. Salinas (Olivos), I. Comas (Pucará), E. Holmgreen (Olivos), J. Vibart (O. Phil.), S. Gamarra S. Fernando), J. Pulido (A. D. F.), E. Parola (Curupaytí), A. Otaño (Pucará), E. Sorhaburu (Olivos), R. Santángelo (Curupaytí), O. Diserio (S. Fernando).
