= 1990 Campeonato Argentino de Rugby =

46° Campeonato Argentino de Mayores
- Champions: Unión de Rugby de Tucumàn (5th title)
- Relegated: Santa Fè and Entre Rios

The 1990 Campeonato Argentino de rugby was won for the fourth consecutive year by the selection of Unión de Rugby de Tucumàn that beat in the final the selection of Cuyo

== Rugby Union in Argentina in 1990 ==
=== National ===
- The Buenos Aires Championship was won by Alumni
- The Cordoba Province Championship was won by Tala
- The North-East Championship was won by Tucumán RC

=== International ===
- The England national rugby union team visited Argentina, seventeen year after the refuse of 1973 ( a tour was arranged but was last minute cancelled by Rugby Football Union worried, about the political situation in Argentina. The series was tied (1-1).

For the first time in his history, England accepted to play a match with a club and not against a provincial selection. The match is against Banco Nacion led Hugo Porta that obtained an historical victory.

- The remaining of the years for "Pumas" was a Nightmare, an internal loss against Canada, and a tour in British Isles with heavy losses against Scotland and Ireland. Hugo Porta came back for that occasion but was injured and leave the national team, and same month after spot to play rugby.

== "Campeonato" Tournemanet ==
The better eight teams played for title. They were divided in two pools of four, the first two each pools admitted to semifinals, the last relegated in secondo division

=== Pool A ===
Qualified for Semifinals
Relegated

| Place | Team | Games | | | | Points | | | Table points |
| Place | Team | played | won | drawn | lost | for | against | diff. | Table points |
|---|---|---|---|---|---|---|---|---|---|
| 1 | Tucumàn | 3 | 3 | 0 | 0 | 94 | 51 | 43 | 6 |
| 2 | Cuyo | 3 | 2 | 0 | 1 | 64 | 73 | -9 | 4 |
| 3 | Buenos Aires | 3 | 1 | 0 | 2 | 60 | 41 | 19 | 2 |
| 4 | Santa Fè | 3 | 0 | 0 | 3 | 37 | 90 | -53 | 0 |

=== Pool B ===
Qualified for Semifinals
Relegated

| Place | Team | Games | | | | Points | | | Table points |
| Place | Team | played | won | drawn | lost | for | against | diff. | Table points |
|---|---|---|---|---|---|---|---|---|---|
| 1 | Mar del Plata | 3 | 2 | 0 | 1 | 67 | 73 | -6 | 4 |
| 2 | Rosario | 3 | 1 | 1 | 1 | 63 | 53 | 10 | 3 |
| 3 | Córdoba | 3 | 1 | 1 | 1 | 53 | 50 | 3 | 3 |
| 4 | Entre Rios | 3 | 1 | 0 | 2 | 39 | 46 | -7 | 2 |

== Semifinals ==
3 November 1990

| Tucumàn | 46-18 | Rosario |

C.A. Tucumán, Tucumán

3 November 1990

| Mar del Plata | 24-31 | Cuyo |

C.A. Tucumán, Tucumán

== Third place final ==
4 November 1990

| Mar del Plata | 23-11 | Rosario |

C.A. Tucumán, Tucumán

== Final ==
4 November 1990

| Tucumàn | 27-13 | Cuyo |
| Try: Herrera G. Terán; Con: Gauna 2. Pen: Gauna 4, Drop: Williams | | Try: Roby. Pen: Cipitelli 3. |

C.A. Tucumán, Tucumán
Referee: José L. Rolandi

Tucumán: 15. F. Williams, 14.G. Terán, 13.P. Gauna, 12.L. Herrera, 11.M. Terán, 10.R. Sauze, 9.P. Merlo (Cap.), 8.F. Buabse, 7.S. Bunader, 6.J.Santamarina, 5.H. Apas, 4, C. Gentile (Micheli 51'), 3.S. Paz Posse, 2.J. Paz (h), 1.L. Corla.
Cuyo:15.F. Lola, 14.M. Roby, 13.C. Cipitelli (Cap.), 12.Carbonell, 11.E. Saurina, 10.G. Andía, 9.F. Silvestre, 8.Correa Llanos, 7.J.Chiapetta (C. Guillot 64'), 6.M. Cassone, 5.Perez Caffe, 4.Gómez, 3.O. Montaña, 2.A. Gutiérrez, 1.R. Grau.

- Champions: Tucumán
- Relegated: Santa Fè and Entre Rios

== "Classificacion" Tournament ==
Teams are divided in two pools: the winners of each, promoted to "Campeonato" tournament

=== Pool "C" ===
| Place | Team | Games | | | | Points | | | Table points |
| Place | Team | played | won | drawn | lost | for | against | diff. | Table points |
|---|---|---|---|---|---|---|---|---|---|
| 1 | Noreste | 5 | 5 | 0 | 0 | 405 | 28 | 377 | 10 |
| 2 | Salta | 4 | 3 | 0 | 2 | 130 | 100 | 30 | 6 |
| 3 | Santiago del estero | 4 | 2 | 0 | 2 | 113 | 87 | 26 | 4 |
| 4 | Jujuy | 5 | 2 | 0 | 3 | 101 | 236 | -135 | 4 |
| 5 | Misiones | 5 | 1 | 0 | 4 | 81 | 191 | -110 | 2 |
| 6 | Rio Uruguay | 3 | 0 | 0 | 3 | 21 | 209 | -188 | 0 |

Promoted: Noreste (Rio Uruguay left tournament after 3 match)

=== Pool "D" ===
| Place | Team | Games | | | | Points | | | Table points |
| Place | Team | played | won | drawn | lost | for | against | diff. | Table points |
|---|---|---|---|---|---|---|---|---|---|
| 1 | Alto Valle | 5 | 4 | 1 | 0 | 157 | 48 | 109 | 9 |
| 2 | Sur | 5 | 4 | 0 | 1 | 142 | 69 | 73 | 8 |
| 3 | San Juan | 5 | 3 | 1 | 1 | 204 | 66 | 138 | 7 |
| 4 | Austral | 5 | 1 | 0 | 4 | 41 | 135 | -94 | 2 |
| 5 | Chubut | 5 | 1 | 0 | 4 | 50 | 179 | -129 | 2 |
| 6 | Oeste | 5 | 1 | 0 | 4 | 45 | 142 | -97 | 2 |

Promoted: Alto Valle
