= 1997 Campeonato Argentino de Rugby =

Rugby union competition season

53º Campeonato Argentino
- Number of teams: 19
- Champions: Cordoba (3rd title)
- Runners-up: Buenos Aires

The 1997 Campeonato Argentino de Rugby was the 51st annual rugby competition held in Argentina in 1997. Cordoba defeated Rosario in the final game to win the tournament.

The Campeonato Argentino consisted of 21 teams, divided into three divisions, "Campeonato", "Ascenso" and "Promocional".

== Rugby Union in Argentina in 1997 ==
=== National ===
- The "Campeonato Argentino Menores de 21" (Under 21 championship) was won by Buenos Aires
- The "Campeonato Argentino Menores de 19" (Under 19 championship) was won by Buenos Aires
- The "National Championship for clubs" was won by Jockey Club de Rosario
- The "Torneo de la URBA" (Buenos Aires) was won by San Isidro Club
- The "Cordoba Province Championship" was won by La Tablada
- The North-East Championship was won by Universitario de Tucumán

=== International ===
- May–June: The England National Rugby Union team visited Argentina. They played six matches, with two tests. The first test was won by England, the second by the Pumas.
- The Pumas went on a tour of New Zealand in June. They lost five out of six matches, with two heavy losses against the All Blacks by the scores of 8-93, and 10-62.
- October–November: The Australian National Rugby Union Team played five matches in Argentina before their tournament in Great Britain. One test match was won by the Wallabies by the score of (23-15), and one by the Pumas (18-16).
- Argentina won the South American Championship.

== "Campeonato" ==
The title was decided by a round robin tournament, with the last place finisher relegated to the second division.

1ª round
5 April	Cordoba	-	Buenos Aires	33-29	Cordoba
5 April	Tucumàn	-	Rosario	21-56	S.Miguel de T.
5 April	Mar del Plata	-	Cuyo	14-16	Mar del Plata

2ª round
12 April	Cuyo	-	Cordoba	26-26	Mendoza
12 April	Mar del Plata	-	Tucumàn	17-35	Mar del Plata
12 April	Rosario	-	Buenos Aires	21-29	Rosario

3ª round
19 April	Rosario	-	Mar del Plata	45-13	Rosario
19 April	Buenos Aires	-	Cuyo	80-18	Buenos Aires
19 April	Tucumàn	-	Cordoba	29-30	S.Miguel de T.

4ª round
26 April	Cuyo	-	Rosario	15-22	Mendoza
26 April	Buenos Aires	-	Tucumàn	42-13	Buenos Aires
26 April	Cordoba	-	Mar del Plata	68-20	Cordoba

5ª round
3 May	Rosario	-	Cordoba	20-25	Rosario
3 May	Cuyo	-	Tucumàn	37-40	Mendoza
3 May	Mar del Plata	-	Buenos Aires	0-100	Mar del Plata

Champions
Relegated to "Ascenso"

Place	Team	Games				Points			Table points
Place	Team	played	won	drawn	lost	for	against	diff.	Table points
1	Cordoba	5	4	1	0	182	124	58	9
2	Buenos Aires	5	4	0	1	280	115	165	8
3	Rosario	5	3	0	2	164	103	61	6
4	Tucumàn	5	2	0	3	156	182	-26	4
5	Cuyo	5	1	1	3	112	182	-70	3
6	Mar del Plata	5	0	0	5	76	264	-188	0

== "Ascenso" ==
	NOE	SAL	SFE	S-J	E-R	STG
Noroeste	––––	36-26	47-5	25-25	72-5	22-13
Salta	26-36	––––	31-31	26-23	38-32	79-17
Santa Fè	5-47	31-31	––––	24-14	47-10	25-13
San Juan	25-25	23-26	14-24	––––	38-8	53-13
Entre Rios	5-72	32-38	10-47	8-38	––––	30-13
Santiago	13-22	17-79	13-25	13-53	13-30	––––

Promoted to "Campeonato"
Relegated to "Promocional"

Place	Team	Games				Points			Table points
Place	Team	played	won	drawn	lost	for	against	diff.	Table points
1	Noroeste	5	4	1	0	202	74	128	9
2	Salta	5	3	1	1	200	139	61	7
3	Santa Fè	5	3	1	1	132	115	17	7
4	San Juan	5	2	1	2	153	96	57	5
5	Entre Rios	5	1	0	4	85	208	-123	2
6	Santiago	5	0	0	5	69	209	-140	0

== "Promocional" ==
=== Pool A ===
The Centro team forfeited and did not participate in the tournament.

	A-V	CHU	SUR	AUS
Alta Valle	––––	29-20	22-21	24-18
Chubut	20-29	––––	15-14	30-17
Sur	21-22	14-15	––––	52-15
Austral	18-24	17-30	15-52	––––

Qualified for final

Place	Team	Games				Points			Table points
Place	Team	played	won	drawn	lost	for	against	diff.	Table points
1	Alta Valle	3	3	0	0	75	59	16	6
2	Chubut	3	2	0	1	65	60	5	4
3	Sur	3	1	0	2	87	52	35	2
4	Austral	3	0	0	3	50	106	-56	0

=== Pool B ===
The Cuenca del Salado and Oeste teams forfeited and did not participate in the tournament.

	MIS	FOR	JUJ
Misiones	––––	40-29	69-14
Formosa	29-40	––––	25-6
Jujuy	14-69	6-25	––––

Qualified for Semifinals
Relegated

Place	Team	Games				Points			Table points
Place	Team	played	won	drawn	lost	for	against	diff.	Table points
1	Misiones	2	2	0	0	109	43	66	4
2	Formosa	2	1	0	1	54	46	8	2
3	Jujuy	2	0	0	2	20	94	-74	0

=== Final ===
17 May 1997

Misiones	15-66	Alta Valle

- Alta Valle was promoted to "ascenso"
