= 2001 Campeonato Argentino de Rugby =

Rugby union competition season

57° Campeonato Argentino
- Champions: Córdoba (4th title)
- Runners-up: Buenos Aires
- Relegated: Chubut and Salta

The Campeonato Argentino de Rugby 2001 was won by the selection of Unione di Córdoba that beat in the final the selection of Buenos Aires The 23 teams participating were divided on three levels: "Campeonato", "Ascenso", "Promocional".

== Rugby Union in Argentina in 2001 ==
=== National ===
- The title of Buenos Aires Championship was not assigned.
- The Cordoba Province Championship was won by La Tablada.
- The North-East Championship was won by Huirapuca SC.

=== International ===
- In June the "Pumas" went to New Zealand for a series four matches. They beat Counties Manukau and Thames Valley, but lost to the All Blacks and New Zealand Maori.
- in July is Argentina, beat Italy (38-17)
- In November "The Pumas" went to Europe. Plays four matches, winning the tests with Wales and Scotland.
- The Pumas close the year hosting New Zealand. After a great match, they lost to a late try by the All Blacks (20-24)
- In November a "development team" won the 2001 South American championship

== "Campeonato" ==
Two pools di 4 teams. The first two to semifinals, third and fourth to the relegation playout.

=== Pool A ===
1.Round
8 October	Rosario	-	Buenos Aires	26 - 20	Rosario
8 October	Cuyo	-	Chubut	53 - 33	Mondoza

2.Round
13 October	Buenos Aires	-	Cuyo	39 - 28	Buenos Aires
13 October	Chubut	-	Rosario	17 - 6	Trelew

3.Round
20 October	Buenos Aires	-	Chubt	95 - 0	Buenos Aires
20 October	Rosario	-	Cuyo	33 - 21	Rosario

Ranking:

Qualified for Semifinals
to play out

Place	Team	Games				Points			Table points
Place	Team	played	won	drawn	lost	for	against	diff.	Table points
1	Buenos Aires	3	2	0	1	154	54	100	4
2	Rosario	3	2	0	1	63	60	3	4
3	Cuyo	3	1	0	2	104	103	1	2
4	Chubut	3	1	0	2	50	154	-104	2

=== Pool B ===
1.Round
8 October	Tucumán	-	Mar del Plata	33 - 24	Tucumán
8 October	Salta	-	Córdoba	17 - 28	Salta

2.Round
13 October	Tucumán	-	Salta	30 - 22	Tucumán
13 October	Córdoba	-	Mar del Palta	44 - 21	Córdoba

3.Round
20 October	Córdoba	-	Tucumán	35 - 30	Córdoba
20 October	Mar del Plata	-	Salta	24 - 20	Mar del Plata

Ranking:

Qualified for Semifinals
to play out

Place	Team	Games				Points			Table points
Place	Team	played	won	drawn	lost	for	against	diff.	Table points
1	Córdoba	3	3	0	0	107	68	39	6
2	Tucumàn	3	2	0	1	93	81	12	4
3	Mar del Plata	3	1	0	2	69	97	-28	2
4	Salta	3	0	0	3	59	82	-23	0

=== Semifinals ===
Semifinals
26 October	Rosario	-	Córdoba	13 - 30
26 October	Buenos Aires	-	Tucumán	34 - 27

=== Final ===
Finale
28 October	Córdoba	-	Buenos Aires	30 - 20

=== Play Out ===
Play-out
27 October	Mar del Plata	-	Chubut	25 - 6
27 October	Cuyo	-	Salta	38 - 32

- Relegated: Chubut and Salta

== "Ascenso" ==
=== Pool A ===
1.Round
8 October	Entre Rios	-	Santa Fe	17 - 19
8 October	Noreste	-	Santiago del estero	64 - 0

2.Round
13 October	Santa Fe	-	Noreste	42 - 20
13 October	Santagio	-	Emtre Rios	18 - 58

3.Round
20 October	Entre Rios	-	Noreste	21 - 20
20 October	Santa Fe	-	Rosario	99 - 10

Ranking:

Promoted

Place	Team	Games				Points			Table points
Place	Team	played	won	drawn	lost	for	against	diff.	Table points
1	Santa Fè	3	3	0	0	160	44	116	6
2	Entre Rios	3	2	0	1	93	57	36	4
3	Noreste	3	1	0	2	104	63	41	2
4	Santiago de l'Estero	3	0	0	3	28	221	-193	0

=== Pool B ===
1.Round
8 October	Alto Valle	-	San Juan	11 - 45
8 October	Austral	-	Sur	32 - 45

2.Round
13 October	San Juan	-	Austral	27 - 9
13 October	Sur	-	Alto Valle	43 - 3

3.Round
20 October	Alto Valle	-	Austral	26 - 28
20 October	San Juan	-	Sur	18 - 9

Ranking:

Promoted

Place	Team	Games				Points			Table points
Place	Team	played	won	drawn	lost	for	against	diff.	Table points
1	San Juan	3	3	0	0	90	29	61	6
2	Sur	3	2	0	1	97	53	44	4
3	Austral	3	1	0	2	69	98	-29	2
4	Alto Valle	3	0	0	3	40	116	-76	0
