= 1950 Campeonato Argentino de Rugby =

6° Campeonato Argentino
- Countries: Argentina
- Champions: Provincia (5th title)
- Runners-up: Capital

The 1950 Campeonato Argentino de Rugby was won by the selection of Buenos Aires Province ("Provincia") that beat the selection of Capital in the final.

This edition saw the first presence of the selections of La Plata and Río Paranà, formed by team of Santa Fe Province (Rosario excluded) and Entre Ríos. Before this club were part of the Unión de Rugby del Litoral Argentino. Starting from this time, it will be formed only by the club from Rosario.

== Rugby Union in Argentina in 1950 ==
- The "Championship of Buenos Aires" was shared by Club Universitario de Buenos Aires and Pucará
- The "Cordoba Province Championship" was won by Jockey Club Córdoba
- The North-East Championship was not assigned

== Table ==
Quarter-finals
3–10 September
Rosario	0
Provincia	19
3–10 September
Cuyo	3
La Plata	6
3–10 September
Cordoba	0
Capital	21
3–10 September
Río Paranà	8
UR del Norte	6

Semi-finals
17 September
Provincia	37
La Plata	3
17 September
Capital	44
Río Paranà	6

Final
24 September
Provincia	6
Capital	0

== Knockout stages ==
QUARTERS OF FINALS
3 sept.	Córdoba	-	Capital	0 - 21	Córdoba
3 sept.	Rosario	-	Provincia	0 - 19	Rosario
3 sept.	Cuyo	-	La Plata	3 - 6	Mendoza
10 sept.	Río Paranà	-	UR del Norte	8 - 6	Santa Fe

SEMIFINALS
17 sept.	Capital	-	Río Paranà	44 - 6	G.E.B.A., Buenos Aires
17 sept.	Provincia	-	La Plata	37 - 3	G.E.B.A., Buenos Aires

== Final ==
24 September 1950

Provincia	6-0	Capital

GEBA, Buenos Aires
Referee: S. N. Oerton

Provincia: R. Frigerio (Pucará), C. Arana (CASI), A. Jones (Old G's), A. Palma (Pucará), E. Caffarone (Olivos), R. Giles (Pucará), G. Ehrman (Pucará), L. Allen (CASI), M. Sarandón (cap.) (SIC), D. Haxell (Old G's), E. Domínguez (Pucará), J. Neira (Curupaytí), N. Tompkins (Old G's), C. Swain (Old G's), R. Follet (Old G's).
Capital: J. Genoud (C.U.B.A.), U. O'Farrel (C.U.B.A.), D. Wesley Smith (Bs. As.), J. Comotto (Hindú), D. Farrell (Hindú), R. Quian (C.U.B.A.), P. Felisari (Belgrano), A. Dillon (Belgrano), E. Holmberg (C.U.B.A.), J. O'Farrell (C.U.B.A.), A. Phillips(cap.) (Belgrano), C. Morea (C.U.B.A.), A. Bori (Belgrano), H. Achaval (C.U.B.A.), R. Pont Lezica (C.U.B.A.).

== Bibliography ==
- (in Spanish) Memorias de la UAR 1950
- (in Spanish) VI Campeonato Argentino
