= 1957 Campeonato Argentino de Rugby =

13 °Campeonato Argentino
- Countries: Argentina
- Champions: Capital (4th title)

The 1957 Campeonato Argentino de Rugby was won by the selection of Capital that beat in the final the selection of Buenos Aires Province ("Provincia").

== Rugby Union in Argentina in 1957 ==
- The Buenos Aires Championship was won by C.A.S.I.
- The Cordoba Province Championship was won by Universitario
- The North-East Championship was won by Natación y Gimnasia

== Knock out stages ==
PRELIMINARY
18 August	UR del Norte	-	Rio Cuarto	28 - 3	Tucumán
18 August	Santa Fe	-	Cuyo	-	Cuyo withdrawed
18 August	Mar del Plata	-	Córdoba	9 - 8	Córdoba
18 August	Río Paranà	-	San Juan	14 - 0	Paranà

QUARTERS OF FINALS
15 September	UR del Norte	-	Capital	5 - 15	Tucumán
15 September	Santa Fe	-	Rosario	9 - 14	Santa Fe
15 September	Mar del Plata	-	Provincia	3 - 18	Mar del Plata
15 September	Río Paranà	-	La Plata	6 - 9	Paranà

== Semifinals ==
22 September 1957

Provincia	5-0	La Plata
Try: Berro García, Con: Campos

San Isidro Club, Buenos Aires
Referee: Carlos M. Seminario

Provincia: J. Olazábal, R. Faldutti, J. Campos, J. Berro García, J. Ramallo, M. Guyot, E. Holmgren, J. Madero, E. Mitchelstein, R. Ochoa, E. Parola, R. Dell'Acqua, F. Tosato, R. Santángelo, C. Travaglini

La Plata: C. Sabalzagaray, E. Vergara, H. Tiribelli, E. Brea, H. Zapettini, N. Dutil, J. Dubarry, R. La Rosa, H. Carnicero, C. Sacerdote, J. Roan, C. Olivera, R. Giner, H. Dentone, L. Gorostiaga

22 September 1957

Capital	17-6	Rosario
Try: Ricciardello, Bazán, Horan; Con: Fernández del Casal; Pen: Fernández del Casal		Pen: Cavallo, 2

San Isidro Club, Buenos Aires
Referee: Eduardo Fornés

Capital: J. Genoud, E. Horan, R. Raimundez, E. Fernández del Casal, A. Ricciardello, R. Bazán, P. Felisari, S. Hogg, A. Bublath, M. Azpiroz, J. Diez, A. Dillon, E. Gaviña, C. Ezcurra, E. Hirsch.

Rosario: F. Cavallo, R. Abalos, G. Recagno, J. Arce, A. Drincovich, A. Robson, R. Conti, C. Kaden, J. Ramos, E. Celentano, A Colla, J. Silvetti, C. Silvestre, F. Alonso, R. Alonso

== Final ==
29 September 1957

Capital	11-0	Provincia
Try: Felisari, Lloran; Con: de Fernández del Casal; Pen: de Fernández del Casal

San Isidro Club, Buenos Aires
Referee: Francisco Lamastra

Capital: J. Genoud, J. Ricciardello, R. Raimundez, E. Fernández del Casal, E. Horan, R. Bazán, P. Felisari, S. Hogg, A. Bublath, G. Schon, J. Diez, A. Dilon, E. Gaviña, C. Ezcurra, E. Hirsch
Provincia: J. Olazábal, R. Faldutti, J. Campos, J. Berro García, C. Ra¬mallo, M. Guyot, E. Holmgren, J. Madero, E. Mitchelstein, R. Ochoa, E. Parola, R. Dell'Acqua, F. Tosato, R. Saitángelo, C. Travaglini.

== Bibliography ==
- (in Spanish) Memorias de la UAR 1957
- (in Spanish) XIII Campeonato Argentino
