= 1985 Campeonato Argentino de Rugby =

41° Campeonato Argentino de Mayores
- Countries: Argentina
- Number of teams: 19
- Champions: Tucumán (1st title)
- Runners-up: Buenos Aires

The Campeonato Argentino de Rugby 1985 was won for the first time by the selection of Tucumán that beat in the final the selection of Buenos Aires

== Rugby Union in Argentina in 1985 ==
=== National ===
- The selection of Buenos Aires won the "Campeonado de Minores" (Under21 Championship)
- The Buenos Aires Championship was won by C.A.S.I.
- The Cordoba Province Championship was won by Tala
- The North-East Championship was won by Los Tarcos

=== International ===
- In 1985, Argentina, received two visits of international selections : France and New Zealand.

With France, Argentina draw the series (1 victory both)

With the "All Blacks", the Pumas lost the first test (20-33) but draw the second test.

== Preliminaries ==
Buenos Aires directly admitted to semifinals

=== Zone A ===
1st round
| 21 September | Austral | - | Chubut | 24 - 14 | Comodoro Rivadavia |
| 21 September | Alto Valle | - | Sur | 15 - 13 | Comodoro Rivadavia |

Final
| 24 September | Chubut | - | Alto Valle | 6 - 30 | Comodoro Rivadavia |

=== Zone B ===
PRELIMINARY
| 24 September | Jujuy | - | Salta | 13 - 52 | Jujuy |

1st round
| 21 September | San Juan | - | Salta | 20 - 13 | San Juan |
| 21 September | Cuyo | - | Santa Fe | 23 - 16 | San Juan |

Final
| 24 September | San Juan | - | Cuyo | 6 - 28 | San Juan |

=== Interzone A-B ===
INTERZONE
| 29 September | Alto Valle | - | Cuyo | 6 - 58 | Neuquén |

=== Zone C ===
1st round
| 28 September | Santiago del estero | - | Córdoba | 3 - 65 | Santiago |
| 28 September | Tucumán | - | Misiones | 49 - 6 | Santiago |

Final
| 28 September | Tucumán | - | Córdoba | 38 - 19 | Santiago |

=== Zone D ===
1st round
| 28 September | Mar del Plata | - | Noreste | 3 - 65 | Mar del Plata |
| 28 September | Rosario | - | Entre Rios | 49 - 6 | Mar del Plata |

Final
| 28 September | Tucumán | - | Córdoba | 38 - 19 | Mar del Plata |

== Semifinals ==
SEMIFINALS
| 5 October | Buenos Aires | - | Cuyo | 58 - 9 | Buenos Aires |
| 5 October | Tucumán | - | Mar del Plata | 35 - 12 | Buenos Aires |

== Final ==
6 October 1985

| Buenos Aires | 9-13 | Tucumán |
| Pen: Hugo Porta 3 | | Try: Marcelo Ricci; Pen: Lucas Perro 3 |

Referee: Miguel Angel Peyrone (Rosario)

Buenos Aires: 15.Bernardo Miguen, 14.Fernando Ibarrola, 13.Marcelo Loffreda, 12. Rafael Madero, 11.Marcelo Campo, 10. Hugo Porta (Cap.), 9.Martín Yanguela, 8.Marcos Giana, 7.Gabriel Traveglini, 6.Marcos Baeck, 5.Roberto Cobello, 4.Joaquín Uriarte, 3.Pablo Devoto, 2.Claudio Granno, 1.Daniel Sanés.
Tucuman:15.José Ríos, 14.Juan Soler, 13.Gabriel Terán, 12.Alvaro Carrizo, 11.José Gianotti, 10.Lucas Perro, 9.Pedro Merlo, 8.José Santamarina, 7.Marcelo Ricci (Cap.), 6.Pedro Garreton, 5.Roberto De Luce, 4.Sergio Bunader, 3.Ricardo Horte, 2.Ricardo Lefort, 1.Luto Molina.

== External Links - Bibliography ==
- (in Spanish) Memorias de la UAR 1985
- (in Italian) Francesco Volpe, Paolo Pacitti (Author), Rugby 2000, GTE Gruppo Editorale (1999)
