= 1959 Campeonato Argentino de Rugby =

15° Campeonato Argentino
- Countries: Argentina
- Champions: Provincia (10th title)
- Runners-up: Capital

The Campeonato Argentino de Rugby 1959 was won by the selection of Buenos Aires Province ("Provincia") that beat in the final the selection of Capital.

== Rugby Union in Argentina in 1959 ==
- The Buenos Aires Championship was won by Buenos Aires CRC
- The Cordoba Province Championship was won by Universitario
- The North-East Championship was won by Universitario Tucuman
- The selection of Junior Springboks, 27 years after their first tour, visit Argentina and Chile, winning all the 13 matches (two against Argentina national team)

== Knock out stages ==
("Provincia" and "Capital" directly admitted to quarter of finals)

PRELIMINARY
2 August	Río Paranà	-	Valle de Lerma	24 - 8	Paranà
2 August	UR del Norte	-	San Juan	19 - 9	Tucumán
2 August	Rio Cuarto	-	Córdoba	6 - 17	Rio Cuarto
2 August	Santa Fe	-	Mar del Plata	3 - 8	Santa Fe
2 August	Sur	-	La Plata	3 - 8	Bahía Blanca
2 August	Cuyo	-	Rosario	6 - 27	Córdoba

QUARTERS OF FINALS
16 August	UR del Norte	-	Río Paranà	21 - 0	Tucumán
16 August	Córdoba	-	Capital	5 - 18	Córdoba
16 August	Mar del Plata	-	Provincia	0 - 14	Mar del Plata
16 August	Rosario	-	La Plata	6 - 9	Rosario

== Semifinals ==
27 September 1959

Provincia	12-0	La Plata
Try: Bianchetti, Pulido, Rosenblat, Bernacchi

Estadio GEBA, Buenos Aires
Referee: Francisco Lamastra

Provincia: H. Rosenblat, E. Bianchetti, J. Guidi, A. Salinas, O. Bernacchi, J. Sascaro, E. Holmgreen, J. Pulido, F. Varela, A. Moreno, R. Schimdt, B. Otaño, J. Lucas, J. Casanegra, O. Martínez.
La Plata: J. Manes, P. Grossi, R. La Rosa, R. Wilt, R. Posadas, E. Cáceres, J. Buriñigo, E. Foulkes, H. Carnicero, A. Nogueira, A. Cervini, L. Nápoli, R. Goso, A. Dentone, R. Gorostiaga.

27 September 1959

Capital	10-9	UR del Norte
Try: Trebotich, Karplus		Try: Peiró, Terán; Con: Lafleur 2 Pen: Terán ,

Estadio GEBA, Buenos Aires
Referee: César de Elizalde

Capital: R. Raimundez, C. Raimundez, E. Karplus, L. Mendez, C. Giuliano, A Guastella, V. Mayol, S. Hogg, M. Azpiroz, J. La¬fleur, J. Trebotich, R. Rumboll, E. Gaviña, H. Vidou, E. Verardo
Norte: Nougués, J. Terán, C. Valdez, A. Peiró, J. Esteban, J. Nucci, A. Frías Silva, O. Paz, L. Nieva Moreno, J. Paz, C. Diam¬bra, J. Carlino, J. Ritorto, J. Centurión, R. Terán Vega

== Final ==
10 October 1959

Provincia	3-0	Capital
Try: Bernacchi

Estadio GEBA, Buenos Aires
Referee: Chris Ackermann (South Africa)

Provincia : R. Raimundez, C. Giuliano, E. Karplus, L. Mendez, C. Raimundez, A. Guastella, V. Mayol, J. Lafleur, M. Azpiroz, S. Hogg, R. Hogg, J. Trebotich, E. Verardo, H. Vidou, E. Gaviña.
Capital: H. Rosenblat, E. Bianchetti, J. Álvarez, J. Guidi, O. Bernacchi, J. Sascaro, E. Holmgreen, A. Moreno, F. Varela, J. Pulido, R. Schmidt, B. Otaño, O. Martínez, J. Casanegra, J. Lucas

The referee of the match was the South African Ackermann, that was following the South African selection of Junior Springboks, that ended his tour in South America. The selection of "Capital" and Provincia, was without with the national team against South Africa. In the same day, was arranged a match between two mixed teams of South African and Argentine and players.
