= 1987 Campeonato Argentino de Rugby =

Rugby tournament

43° Campeonato Argentino de Mayores
- Champions: Tucumán (2nd title)
- Runners-up: Cordoba

The 'Campeonato Argentino de Rugby' 1987 was won by the selection of Unión de Rugby de Tucumàn that beat in the final the selection of Unión Cordobesa de Rugby.

In this edition, eas changed the formula, with 18 teams divided in 6 pools called "Zonas". The winners of each pool go to the "final for title" and the other to a "classification tournament". It was a transition to the new formula, that introduced from 1988 divisions with relegation and promotions.

== Rugby Union in Argentina in 1987 ==
=== National ===
- The Buenos Aires Championship was won by San Isidro Club
- The Cordoba Province Championship was won by La Tablada
- The North-East Championship was won by Los Tarcos
- The selection of Tucumàn and the selection of Rosario won ex-aequo the "Juvenil" (under 21 championship), drawing (28-28) the final.

=== International ===
- The "Pumas" won easily (40–12) against Spain, during the tour of European team in South America.
- They won also the last test before the World Cup against Uruguay (38–3)
- At the first edition of World Cup the "Pumas", was eliminated since the first round. It was fatal the defeat against Fiji. As consolation, to the Pumas remain the victory against Italy
- After the World Cup, Australia visited Argentina on tour. The first match was drawn (19-19). Wallabies, won the second test (27–19).
- Against Australia close for a first time his international career Hugo Porta (but there were a comeback in 1990)

== Preliminary Phase ==
ZONE A
Sept. 1987	Córdoba	-	Entre Rios	19 - 9
Sept. 1987	Entre Rios	-	Austral	44 - 3
Sept. 1987	Córdoba	-	Austral	47 - 0

Ranking: 1°Córdoba 4 pt.; 2° Entre Ríos 2 pt.; Austral 0 pt.

ZONE B
Sept. 1987	Cuyo	-	Santiago del estero	31 - 3
Sept. 1987	Cuyo	-	Santa Fe	12 - 6
Sept. 1987	Santiago del estero	-	Santa Fe	13 - 12

Ranking: 1° Cuyo 4 pt.; 2° Sgo.del Estero 2 pt.; Santa Fe 0 pt..

ZONE C
Sept. 1987	Noreste	-	Alto Valle	12 - 4
Sept. 1987	Tucumán	-	Alto Valle	66 - 0
Sept. 1987	Tucumán	-	Boreste	9 - 0

Ranking: . 1° Tucumán 4 pt.; 2° Noreste 2 pt.; 3° Alto Valle 0 pt..

ZONE D
Sept. 1987	Salta	-	Mar del Plata	10 - 9
Sept. 1987	Salta	-	Jujuy	36 - 4
Sept. 1987	Mar del Plata	-	Jujuy	60 - 0

Ranking: 1° Salta 4 pt.; 2° Mar del Plata 2 pt.; 3° Jujuy 0 pt..

ZONE E
Sept. 1987	Misiones	-	Sur	19 - 13
Sept. 1987	Buenos Aires	-	Sur	52 - 0
Sept. 1987	Buenos Aires	-	Misiones	35 - 0

Ranking: 1° Buenos Aires 4 pt.; 2° Misiones 2 pt.; 3° Sur 0 pt..

ZONE F
Sept. 1987	San Juan	-	Rosario	13 - 10
Sept. 1987	San Juan	-	Chubut	38 - 4
Sept. 1987	Rosario	-	Chubut	31 - 0

Ranking: 1° San Juan 4 pt.; 2° Rosario 2 pt.; 3° Chubut 0 pt..

== 13th Place tournament ==
Pool 5
Sept. 1987	Santa Fe	-	Alto Valle	35 - 10
Sept. 1987	Alto Valle	-	Chubut	17 - 9
Sept. 1987	Santa Fe	-	Chubut	41 - 6

Ranking: 1° Santa Fe 4 pt.; 2° Alto Valle 2 pt.; Chubut 0 pt..

Pool 6
Sept. 1987	Jujuy	-	Austral	13 - 9
Sept. 1987	Sur	-	Jujuy	32 - 0
Sept. 1987	Sur	-	Austral	26 - 4

Ranking: 1° Sur 4 pt.; 2° Jujuy 2 pt.; 3° Austral 0 pt.

Final
Sept. 1987	Santa Fe	-	Sur	13 - 9

== 7th Place tournament ==
Pool 3
Sept. 1987	Rosario	-	Santiago del estero	16 - 3
Sept. 1987	Noreste	-	Rosario	12 - 9
Sept. 1987	Noreste	-	Santiago del estero	6 - 6

Ranking: 1° Noreste 3 pt.; 2° Rosario 2 pt.; 3° Sgo.del Estero 1 pt..

Pool 4
Sept. 1987	Mar del Plata	-	Misiones	19 - 6
Sept. 1987	Mar del Plata	-	Entre Rios	6 - 6
Sept. 1987	Entre Rios	-	Misiones	33 - 0

Ranking: 1° Entre Ríos 3 pt. (+ 33); 2° Mar del Plata 3 pt. (+ 13); 3° Misiones 0 pt.

Final
Sept. 1987	Entre Rios	-	Noreste	13 - 4

== Pool for Title ==
Pool 1
Sept. 1987	Salta	-	San Juan	13 - 9	Chat. Carreras, Córdoba
Sept. 1987	Tucumán	-	Salta	33 - 3	Chat. Carreras, Córdoba
Sept. 1987	Tucumán	-	San Juan	3 - 0	Chat. Carreras, Córdoba

Ranking: 1° Tucumán 4 pt.; 2° Salta 2 pt.; 3° San Juan 0 pt..

Pool 2
Sept. 1987	Cuyo	-	Buenos Aires	26 - 7	Chat. Carreras, Córdoba
Sept. 1987	Córdoba	-	Cuyo	15 - 7	Chat. Carreras, Córdoba
Sept. 1987	Córdoba	-	Buenos Aires	18 - 15	Chat. Carreras, Córdoba

Ranking: 1°Córdoba 4 pt.; 2° Cuyo 2 pt.; 3° Buenos Aires 0 pt.

=== Finals ===
5th place Final
27 September 1987	Buenos Aires	-	San Juan	18 - 12	Chat. Carreras, Córdoba

Third place final
27 September 1987	Cuyo	-	Salta	117 - 13	Chat. Carreras, Córdoba

Final
27 September 1987	Tucumàn	-	Cordoba	32 - 7	Chat. Carreras, Córdoba
