= 2005 Campeonato Argentino de Rugby =

61° Campeonato Argentino de Mayores
- Champions: Tucumán (8th title)
- Runners-up: Unión de Rugby de Cuyo.

== Campeonato ==
New formula: 8 eight teams divided in two pools. The first two of each pool admitted to semifinals. The fourth teams to a play-out to avoid relegation.

=== Pool 1 ===
	CUY	COR	SAL	MdP
Cuyo	––––	24-23	29-33	46-10
Córdoba	23-24	––––	41-22	23-13
Salta	33-29	22-41	––––	29-23
Mar del Plata	10-46	13-23	23-29	––––

Qualified for Semifinals
to play-out

Place	Team	Games				Points			Table points
Place	Team	played	won	drawn	lost	for	against	diff.	Table points
1	Cuyo	3	2	0	1	99	66	33	4
2	Córdoba	3	2	0	1	87	59	28	4
3	Salta	3	2	0	1	84	93	-9	4
4	Mar del Plata	3	0	0	3	46	98	-52	0

=== Pool 2 ===
	TUC	BA	ROS	NOE
Tucumán	––––	36-13	18-18	55-29
Buenos Aires	13-36	––––	26-18	76-0
Rosario	18-18	18-26	––––	56-25
Noreste	29-55	0-76	25-56	––––

Qualified for Semifinals
to play-out

Place	Team	Games				Points			Table points
Place	Team	played	won	drawn	lost	for	against	diff.	Table points
1	Tucumán	3	2	1	0	109	60	49	5
2	Buenos Aires	3	2	0	1	115	54	61	4
3	Rosario	3	1	1	1	92	69	23	3
4	Noreste	3	0	0	3	54	187	-133	0

=== Play Out ===
Play Out
26 March	Mar Del Plata	-	Noreste	34 - 9
2 April	Noreste	-	Mar del Plata	21 - 9

- Noreste relegated (lost on aggregate 30-55)

=== Semifinals ===
Semifinals
26 March	Tucuman	-	Cordoba	48 - 18
26 March	Cuyo	-	Buenos Aires	28 - 9

=== Final ===
1.Turno
2 April	Tucuman	-	Cuyo	28 - 9

== Ascenso ==
Sixteen team divided in 4 pools . The first two of each pool to play-offs

=== Pool 1 ===
	SJN	SdE	JUJ	SLS
San Juan	––––	53-5	106-12	34-12
Santiago del Estero	5-53	––––	39-18	51-15
Jujuy	12-106	18-39	––––	18-7
San Luis	12-34	15-51	7-18	––––

Qualified for play-offs

Place	Team	Games				Points			Table points
Place	Team	played	won	drawn	lost	for	against	diff.	Table points
1	San Juan	3	3	0	0	193	29	164	6
2	Santiago del Estero	3	2	0	1	95	86	9	4
3	Jujuy	3	1	0	2	48	152	-104	2
4	San Luis	3	0	0	3	34	103	-69	0

=== Pool 2 ===
	SFE	ER	FOR	MIS
Santa Fe	––––	32-10	39-10	65-3
Entre Rios	10-32	––––	40-7	20-8
Formosa	10-39	7-40	––––	20-17
Misiones	3-65	8-20	17-20	––––

Qualified for play-offs

Place	Team	Games				Points			Table points
Place	Team	played	won	drawn	lost	for	against	diff.	Table points
1	Santa Fe	3	3	0	0	136	23	113	6
2	Entre Rios	3	2	0	1	70	47	23	4
3	Formosa	3	1	0	2	37	96	-59	2
4	Misiones	3	0	0	3	28	105	-77	0

=== Pool 3 ===
	AV	SUR	OES	TAN
Alto Valle	––––	28-11	48-11	74-0
Sur	11-28	––––	41-0	114-3
Oeste	11-48	0-41	––––	52-0
Tandil	0-74	3-114	0-52	––––

Qualified for play-off

Place	Team	Games				Points			Table points
Place	Team	played	won	drawn	lost	for	against	diff.	Table points
1	Alto Valle	3	3	0	0	150	22	128	6
2	Sur	3	2	0	1	166	31	135	4
3	Oeste	3	1	0	2	63	89	-26	2
4	Tandil	3	0	0	3	3	240	-237	0

=== Pool 4 ===
	CHU	AUS	TdF	LdS
Chubut	––––	10-0	75-0	47-14
Austral	0-10	––––	36-12	23-12
Tierra del Fuego	0-75	12-36	––––	10-9
Lagos del Sur	14-47	12-23	9-10	––––

Qualified for play-off

Place	Team	Games				Points			Table points
Place	Team	played	won	drawn	lost	for	against	diff.	Table points
1	Chubut	3	3	0	0	132	14	118	6
2	Austral	3	2	0	1	59	34	25	4
3	Tierra del Fuego	3	1	0	2	22	120	-98	2
4	Lagos del Sur	3	0	0	3	35	80	-45	0

=== Playoffs ===
Quarter of Finals
19 March	Alto Valle	-	Austral	42 - 12
19 March	Chubut	-	Sur	17 - 15
19 March	Santa Fe	-	Santiago de l'estero	47 - 7
19 March	San Juan	-	Entre Rios	24 - 21

Semifinals
26 March	Alto Valle	-	Chubut	17 - 15
26 March	Santa Fé	-	San Juan	12 - 11

Final
2 April	Alto Valle	-	Santa Fe	13 - 17

- Santa Fé promoted to "Campeonato"
