= 1945 Campeonato Argentino de Rugby =

1° Campeonato Argentino
- Countries: Argentina
- Champions: Provincia
- Runners-up: Capital

The 1945 Campeonato Argentino de Rugby was won by the selection of Provincia (Buenos Aires Province) that beat in the final the selection of Capital (Buenos Aires city). This first edition was arranged by River Plate Rugby Union with the goal to develop and improve the rugby outside Buenos Aires territory. The following teams were invited to participate:

- the selection of Capital, ossia di Buenos Aires
- the selection of Provincia
- the selection of Unión de Rugby del Norte (Tucumán),
- The San Martín Rugby Club de Villa María from Cordoba Province
- The Litoral (Combinado de Rosario y Santa Fe)
- Montevideo Cricket Club, (club from Uruguay, traditionally connected with Argentine rugby since 1875)
- C. A. Estudiantes de Paraná
- Unión Cordobesa de Rugby

== Rugby Union in Argentina in 1945 ==
- The "Buenos Aires Championship" was won by Club Universitario de Buenos Aires
- The "Cordoba Province Championship" was won by Universitario Córdoba
- The North-East Championship was won by Tucumán Rugby Club

== Results ==
Quarterfinals
9 September	UR del Norte	-	Capital	3 - 53	Tucumán
9 September	Córdoba	-	Provincia	0 - 36	Córdoba
9 September	San Martin RC	-	Litoral	0 - 5	Villa María
9 September	Montevideo Cricket Club	-	Estudiantes de Paraná	5 - 19	Montevideo

Semi-finals
23 September	Capital	-	Litoral	4 - 3	Maldonado, Buenos Aires
23 September	Provincia	-	Estudiantes de Paraná	29 - 6	Maldonado, Buenos Aires

Final
23 September	Provincia	-	Capital	5 - 4	Maldonado, Buenos Aires

== Bibliography ==
- (in Spanish) Memorias de la UAR 1945
- (in Spanish) I Campeonato Argentino
