= 1988 Campeonato Argentino de Rugby =

44th Campeonato Argentino de Mayores
- Champions: Tucumán (3rd title)
- Runners-up: Buenos Aires.

The 1988 Campeonato Argentino de Rugby was the 1988 version of the annual rugby competition held in Argentina in 1988. The winner, for the second consecutive year was Unión de Rugby de Tucumàn, who defeated the Buenos Aires Rugby Union in the final game.

The Campeonato Argentino consisted of 18 teams, divided into two divisions, based on the records of the individual teams. The top eight qualifiers competed in the final tournament for the title ("Campeonato"), while the others vied in the "Torneo de Classificacion" (qualifying tournament). At the end of the season, the bottom two teams from the upper division, were demoted to the lower division, while the champion and runner-up from the Torneao de Classification were promoted to the upper division.

== Campeonato ==
=== Pool A ===
Pos	Team	Pld	W	D	L	PF	PA	PD	Pts	Qualification or relegation	TUC	CBA	ROS	SFE
1	Tucumàn	3	3	0	0	88	37	+51	6	Qualified for Semi-finals		20–16	43–3	25–18
2	Cordoba	3	2	0	1	65	45	+20	4	Qualified for Semi-finals	16–20		30–15	19–10
3	Rosario	3	1	0	2	75	77	−2	2		3–43	15–30		57–4
4	Santa Fè	3	0	0	3	32	101	−69	0	Relegated	18–25	10–19	4–57	

Tucumàn and Cordoba advanced to the semi-finals, while Santa Fè was demoted to the lower division.

=== Pool B ===
Pos	Team	Pld	W	D	L	PF	PA	PD	Pts	Qualification or relegation	B-A	CUY	E-R	MdP
1	Buenos Aires	3	3	0	0	140	69	+71	6	Qualified for Semifinals		35–33	52–24	53–12
2	Cuyo	3	2	0	1	84	63	+21	4	Qualified for Semifinals	33–35		24–18	27–10
3	Entre Rios	3	1	0	2	71	92	−21	2		24–52	18–24		29–16
4	Mar del Plata	3	0	0	3	38	109	−71	0	Relegated	12–53	10–27	16–29	

Buenos Aires and Cuyo advanced to the semi-finals, while Mar del Plata was demoted to the lower division.

=== Semifinals ===
5 November 1988

Tucumàn	0-43	Cuyo

Estadio Mundialista, Mar del Plata

5 November 1988

Buenos Aires	62-6	Cordoba

Estadio Mundialista, Mar del Plata

=== Third place play-off ===
5 November 1988

Cordoba	31-27	Cuyo

Estadio Mundialista, Mar del Plata

=== Final ===
5 November 1988

Tucumàn	25-10	Buenos Aires
Try: Williams, Gianotti; 1 meta tecnica Con: Sauze 2 Pen: Sauze 3		Try: Piran; Pen: Piccardo; Drop: Piccardo

Estadio Mundialista, Mar del Plata
Referee: Miguel A. Peyrone (Rosario)

== "Classificacion" Tournament ==
=== Pool C ===
Pos	Team	Pld	W	D	L	PF	PA	PD	Pts	STG	NOE	SAL	MIS	JUJ
1	Santiago de l'Estero	4	3	0	1	122	58	+64	6		9–7	38–16	9–20	66–15
2	Noreste	4	3	0	1	88	42	+46	6	7–9		26–15	24–8	31–10
3	Salta	4	2	0	2	131	88	+43	4	16–38	15–26		24–18	76–6
4	Misiones	4	2	0	2	84	57	+27	4	20–9	8–24	18–24		38–0
5	Jujuy	4	0	0	4	31	211	−180	0	15–66	10–31	6–76	0–38	

Promoted: Santiago de l'Estero (defeated Noreste in their head-to-dead match).

=== Pool D ===
Pos	Team	Pld	W	D	L	PF	PA	PD	Pts	S-J	SUR	A-V	CHU	AUS
1	San Juan	4	4	0	0	133	42	+91	8		29–21	28–18	45–0	31–3
2	Sur	4	3	0	1	138	62	+76	6	21–29		41–0	30–15	46–18
3	Alto Valle	4	2	0	2	57	87	−30	4	18–28	0–41		22–6	17–12
4	Chubut	4	1	0	3	37	112	−75	2	0–45	15–30	6–22		16–15
5	Austral	4	0	0	4	48	110	−62	0	3–31	18–46	12–17	15–16	

Promoted: San Juan

== Rugby Union in Argentina in 1988 ==
=== National ===
- The Buenos Aires Championship was won by San Isidro Club
- The Cordoba Province Championship was won by La Tablada
- The North-East Championship was won by Tucumán RC

=== International ===
- During 1988, France toured South America, playing eight games against South American Teams, splitting their two matches against the Pumas. Against the Pumas (managed by Hugo Porta, "Le Coqs" won the first test (18–15) but lost the second 18–6.
- At the end of season, Argentina traveled to France, playing in 8 matches, with a 3–5 record. They lost both matches against the French national team, 29-9 and 28–18.
