= 2012 Campeonato Argentino de Rugby =

68th Campeonato Argentino
- Champions: Córdoba (7th title)
- Runners-up: Rosario
- Relegated: San Juan

The 2012 Campeonato Argentino de Rugby was the 66th version of the annual rugby competition held in Argentina in 2012. It was played between 3 March and 28 April of that year. The winner was Cordobesa, who defeated Rosario in the final game.

The Campeonato Argentino consisted of 28 teams, divided into three divisions, "Campeonato", "Ascenso" and "Estimulo", based on the records of the individual teams. For the first time since 1950, national teams from outside Argentina were admitted into the competition, with teams from Uruguay and Chile being admitted to the Campeonato division, and Brasil and Paraguay admitted to the Estimulo division.

== "Campeonato" ==
=== Preliminary ===
The preliminary round consisted of ten teams divided in two pools of five teams each. The top three of each pool made it to the final pool. The final six teams then played in a round robin tournament, from which the top two teams played for the championship.

- **Pool 1**

Qualified for final pool
to "ascenso" finals

Place	Team	Games				Points			Table points
Place	Team	played	won	drawn	lost	for	against	diff.	Table points
1	Córdoba	4	4	0	0	109	38	+ 71	**8**
2	Tucumán	4	3	0	1	133	71	+ 62	**6**
3	Salta	4	2	0	2	65	58	+ 7	**4**
4	Chile	4	1	0	3	54	115	61	**2**
5	San Juan	4	0	0	4	47	126	79	**0**

- **Pool 2**

Qualified for final pool
to "ascenso" finals

Place	Team	Games				Points			Table points
Place	Team	played	won	drawn	lost	for	against	diff.	Table points
1	Buenos Aires	4	3	0	1	125	43	+ 82	**6**
2	Rosario	4	3	0	1	124	81	+ 43	**6**
3	Cuyo	4	2	0	2	82	128	46	**4**
4	Uruguay	4	1	0	3	69	83	14	**2**
5	Mar del Plata	4	1	0	3	53	118	65	**2**

=== Round robin ===
First phase results. Winners in bold.

First Round
10 March	**Córdoba**	defeated	Tucumán	31 - 18	Cordoba, Jockey Club.
10 March	**Buenos Aires**	defeated	Cuyo	32 - 3	San Isidro, CASI

Second Round
17 March	**Córdoba**	defeated	Salta	19 - 14	Salta, Jockey Club
17 March	**Rosario**	defeated	Buenos Aires	30 - 23	Rosario, Jockey Club

Third Round
24 March	**Tucumán**	defeated	Salta	22 - 17	San Miguel de Tucuman
24 March	**Rosario**	defeated	Cuyo	57 - 20	Mendoza, Marista RC

Second phase results. Winners in bold.

First Round
7 April	**Córdoba**	defeated	Buenos Aires	24 - 21	Tala Rugby Club, Córdoba
7 April	**Rosario**	defeated	Tucumán	34 - 29	Jockey Club, Rosario
7 April	**Salta**	defeated	Cuyo	28 - 23	Mendoza Rugby Club, Mendoza

Second Round
14 April	**Salta**	defeated	Rosario	19 - 16	Jockey Club, Salta
14 April	**Córdoba**	defeated	Cuyo	42- 34	Los Tordos RC, Mendoza
14 April	**Buenos Aires**	defeated	Tucumán	18 - 6	CASI, San Isidro

Third Round
21 April	**Rosario**	defeated	Córdoba	22 - 3	Jockey Club, Rosario
21 April	**Tucumán**	defeated	Cuyo	42 - 22	Lawn Tennis, Tucumán
21 April	**Buenos Aires**	defeated	Salta	24 - 16	CASI, San Isidro

Qualified for final

Place	Team	Games				Points			Table points
Place	Team	played	won	drawn	lost	for	against	diff.	Table points
1°	Rosario	5	4	0	1	162	91	+ 71	8
2°	Córdoba	5	4	0	1	119	109	+ 10	8
3°	Buenos Aires	5	3	0	2	118	79	+ 39	6
4°	Tucumán	5	2	0	3	117	122	+ 5	4
5°	Salta	5	2	0	3	94	104	10	4
6°	Cuyo	5	0	0	5	102	201	99	0

=== Championship game ===
28 April 2012

**Rosario**	**15 - 29**	**Córdoba**

Jockey Club, Rosario

== Second Division: Zona Ascenso ==
Eight teams divided in two pools. The two teams which finished top in their pool play in the semifinal, where the top team from Pool 3 plays the second team from Pool 4, and the top team from Pool 4 plays the second team from Pool 3. The winners of those two games are then put into a pool with the two teams which finished last in the Campeonato division. The two teams which finish first in that final pool will be in the Campeonato division the next year, while the two teams which finish last in that pool will be relegated to the Ascenso Division. Finally, the team which finishes last in Pool 4 plays the team which finishes last in Pool 3, with the loser being demoted the following year to Estimulo division.

=== Pool 3 ===
First Round
3 March	Santa Fe	defeated	Entre Rios	31 - 18	Santa Fe
3 March	Santiago del Estero	defeated	Noreste	33 - 17	Santiago del Estero

Second Round
10 March	Santa Fe	defeated	Noreste	24 - 12	Resistencia
10 March	Entre Rios	defeated	Santiago del Estero	27 - 6	Santiago del Estero

Third Round
17 March	Santa Fe	draw	Santiago del Estero	27 - 27	Santa Fe
17 March	Entre Rios	defeated	Noreste	18 - 9	Paranà

Qualified for Semifinals
to play-out

Place	Team	Games				Points			Table points
Place	Team	played	won	drawn	lost	for	against	diff.	Table points
1°	Santa Fe	3	2	1	0	62	49	+ 13	5
2°	Entre Ríos	3	2	0	1	55	26	+ 29	4
3°	Santiago del Estero	3	1	1	1	66	71	5	3
4°	Noreste	3	0	0	3	38	75	37	0

=== Pool 4 ===
First Round
3 March	Alto Valle	defeated	Sur	34 - 22
3 March	Chubut	defeated	Andina	21 - 12

Second Round
10 March	Alto Valle	defeated	Andina	30 - 24
10 March	Sur	defeated	Chubut	13 - 11

Third Round
17 March	Alto Valle	defeated	Chubut	18 - 0
17 March	Sur	defeated	Andina	30 - 7

Qualified for Semifinals
to play-out

Place	Team	Games				Points			Table points
Place	Team	played	won	drawn	lost	for	against	diff.	Table points
1°	Alto Valle	3	3	0	0	82	46	+ 36	6
2°	Sur	3	2	0	1	65	52	+ 13	4
3°	Valle de Chubut	3	1	0	2	32	43	11	2
4°	Andina	3	0	0	3	43	81	38	0

=== Playout ===
Play-out
24 March	Andina	defeated	Noreste	23 - 12

- Noreste demoted to Estimulo division

=== Semifinals ===
Semifinals
24 March	Santa Fe	defeated	Sur	51 - 0
24 March	Alto Valle	defeated	Entre Rios	25 - 11

=== Final pool ===
First Round
7 April	Santa Fe	defeated	San Juan	18 - 12
7 April	Mar del Plata	defeated	Alto Valle	20 - 12

Second Round
14 April	Alto Valle	defeated	San Juan	24 - 6
14 April	Mar del Plata	-	Santa Fe	15 - 12

Third Round
28 April	Alto Valle	defeated	Santa Fe	13 - 11
28 April	San Juan	-	Mar del Plata	22 - 3

Promoted to "Campeonato" 2013
Relegated to "Ascenso" 2013

Place	Team	Games				Points			Table points
Place	Team	played	won	drawn	lost	for	against	diff.	Table points
1°	Alto Valle	3	2	0	1	49	37	+ 12	4
2°	Mar del Plata	3	2	0	1	38	46	8	4
3°	Santa Fe	3	1	0	2	41	40	+ 1	2
4°	San Juan	3	1	0	2	40	45	5	2

== Torneo "Estimulo" ==
"URBA Desarollo" (a development team from Buenos Aires replaced Brazil. Ten teams total, split into two pools of five teams each. The top team from each pool play each other, with the winner moving up into the Ascenco Division the following year.

=== Pool 5 ===
	MIS	FOR	AUS	JUJ	SCr
Misiones	––––	12-8	7-5	14-7	27-7
Formosa	8-12	––––	6-5	29-12	38-9
Austral	5-7	5-6	––––	22-0	35-7
Jujuy	7-14	12-29	0-22	––––	12-0
Santa Cruz	7-27	9-38	7-35	0-12	––––

Qualified for Semifinals
Relegated

Place	Team	Games				Points			Table points
Place	Team	played	won	drawn	lost	for	against	diff.	Table points
1	Misiones	4	4	0	0	60	27	33	8
2	Formosa	4	3	0	1	81	38	43	6
3	Austral	4	2	0	2	67	20	47	4
4	Jujuy	4	1	0	3	31	65	-34	2
5	Santa Cruz	4	0	0	4	23	112	-89	0

- Misiones advanced to the final game.

=== Pool 6 ===
	URBA	OES	LdS	SLS	TdF
URBA Desarollo	––––	14-0	19-10	10-0	24-0
Oeste	0-14	––––	10-3	15-10	12-0
Lagos del Sur	10-19	3-10	––––	8-3	24-0
San Luis	0-10	10-15	3-8	––––	7-0
Tierra del Fuego	0-24	0-12	0-24	0-7	––––

Qualified for Semifinals
Relegated

Place	Team	Games				Points			Table points
Place	Team	played	won	drawn	lost	for	against	diff.	Table points
1	URBA Desarollo	4	4	0	0	67	10	57	8
2	Oeste	4	3	0	1	37	27	10	6
3	Lagos del Sur	4	2	0	2	45	32	13	4
4	San Luis	4	1	0	3	20	33	-13	2
5	Tierra del Fuego	4	0	0	4	0	67	-67	0

- Oeste advanced to the final game.

=== Final ===
31 March 2012

Oeste	12 - 6	Misiones

- Oeste was promoted to the Ascenso Division
