= Club Atlético Provincial =

Provincial (Rosario)
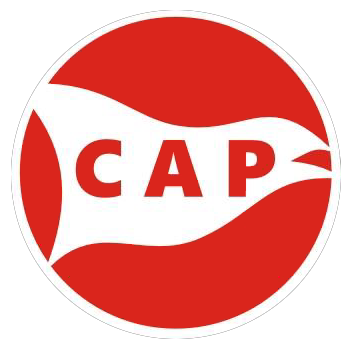
- Full name: Club Atlético Provincial
- Activities: List: Athletics; Basketball; Basque pelota; Bocce; Futsal; Field hockey; Football; Gymnastics; Judo; Rugby union; Running; Swimming; Taekwondo; Tennis; Water aerobics; Water polo; Wrestling; Yoga
- Founded: 25 May 1903; 123 years ago
- Location: Rosario, Argentina
- Colors: Red, White
- Chairman: Sebastián Franco
- Website: caprorosario.com.ar

Club Atlético Provincial, also known as Provincial de Rosario, is an Argentine sports club located in the city of Rosario, Santa Fe.

A wide range of sports are currently hosted by Provincial, such as athletics, basketball, boxing, field Hockey, gymnastics, football, futsal, martial arts, swimming, tennis, volleyball, waterpolo and wrestling.

The club's indoor stadium, Estadio Salvador Bonilla was built in 1982 to host events for the second South American Games, and in 2015 it hosted the FIRS Inline Hockey World Championships.

== History ==
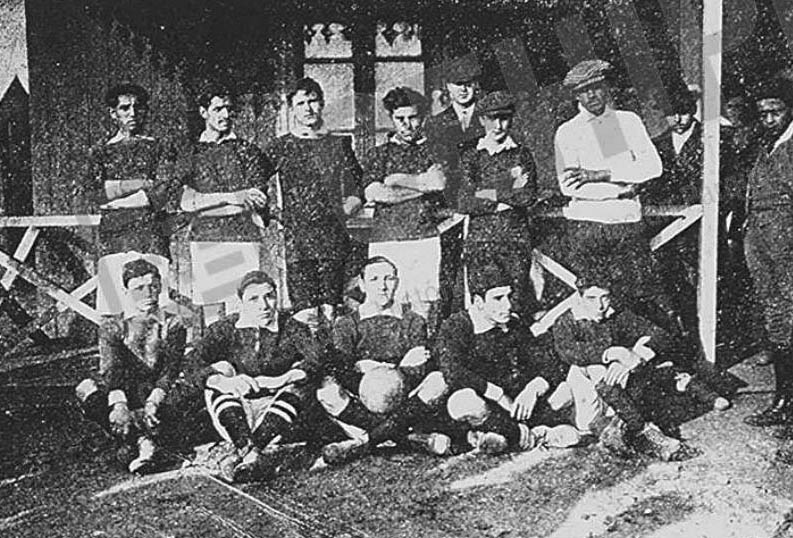
Football team of C.A. Provincial that participated in Copa Jockey Club in 1910

At the beginning of the 20th century, football was becoming more and more popular in Argentina. The city of Rosario was no exception and many football enthusiasts would meet in public parks to have a kick around.

Football clubs were being founded all over the city and young players from the Salta and Oroño neighbourhoods decided to follow suit and create a club of their own.

This is how Club Atlético Provincial came to be founded on 25 May 1903, thanks to the generosity of the Banco Español Rosario branch's director of the time.

Rugby kit

Originally a football only club, an athletics section would be added in 1910 then tennis in 1920, basketball in 1923 and many other sports would follow along the years. When football became professional in Argentina in the 1930s, CAP decided to remain amateur and football is now played at a recreative level at the club.

Most other sports, however, are practiced at a competitive level and many CAP members went on to represent Argentina at international level. The first of which was Luis Brunetto who represented Argentina in Triple jump at the 1924 Summer Olympics, winning the silver medal.

Today, the club is mostly known for its rugby union team.

Although Provincial has played at the highest level of Unión de Rugby de Rosario for a fair number of years, the club has been overshadowed by Rosario rugby's powerhouses: Duendes, Jockey Club de Rosario and, to a lesser extent, Universitario and Gimnasia y Esgrima. However, in recent years, the club has achieved some success, winning the Torneo Regional del Centro in 2009.

Provincial still remains one of the most successful teams in the province and is one of the five Rosarino clubs taking part in the inter-provincial Torneo del Litoral.

== Facilities ==
One of the largest clubs in Argentina, the club counts more than 3,000 members. The institutions also owns 4 different locations throughout the city of Rosario, detailed below:

- Sede Central (headquarters): in Parque de la Independencia, it has tennis, hockey and rugby fields, swimming pools and gyms.
- Estadio Cura: football fields and swimming pools and a recreation area.
- Predio Gral. Lagos: football and rugby fields with a recreation area.
- Predio Tanti: a camping area.
