= 1994 New Zealand Development rugby union tour of Argentina =

Summary
P	W	D	L
Total
7	5	0	2

The 1994 New Zealand rugby union tour of Argentina, was a series of seven match played in March–April 1994 by a New Zealand "development team" in Argentina.

It was not an official tour, and no cap were awarded.

It was a young selection (almost 23 years for all the players). Many of them were after "international" for All Blacks, but also for other country.

== The matches ==
19 March 1994

Rosario	25–20	NZ Development XV
Try: Rodríguez, Dall'Ava; Con: P.Raitieri		Try: Wilson 4, Moore 2 Cottrell, Gordon; Barry, Howarth; Marshall; Con: Howarth 7 Pen: Howarth 3

Duendes RC, Rosario
Referee: Sr.Gustavo López (UAR (Argentina) )

ROSARIO: E.Jurado; G.Romero Acuña, M.Benzi, Molina, Bianchi; G.del Castillo, R.Crexell (capt.); M.Sugasti, L.Oviedo, M.Carmona; R.Pérez, N.Bossicovich; M.Céspedes, D.Silvetti, C.Promanzio.
NZ DEVELOPMENT XV: J.Wilson; G.Konia, L. Stensness, A.Ieremia, P.Cooke; S.Howarth, J.Preston; D.Anglesey (L.Barry), J. Mitchell (capt.), B.Larsen; S.Gordon, Glenn Taylor; G.Slater, N.Hewitt, M.Allen.

22 March 1994

Entre Rios	12–78	NZ Development XV
Try: Rodríguez, Dall'Ava; Con: P. Raitieri		Try: Wilson 4, Moore 2 Cottrell, Gordon; Barry, Howarth; Marshall; Con: Howarth 7 Pen: Howarth 3

C.A. Estudiantes, Paraná
Referee: Gustavo López (UAR (Argentina) )

ENTRE RIOS: Pino; Zabala (Zitelli), Torres, P.Raitieri, Rodríguez; Dorigón, Perasso; Bourdin, Di Palma, Manzoni; Reyes, Dall'Ava; Horisberger (C.Raitieri), Lerena (Perren), Uranga (Mendez).
NZ DEVELOPMENT XV: S.Howarth; J.Wilson, John Leslie, S.Cottrell, E.Clarke; S.Mannix, J.Marshall; J. Mitchell (capt.), L.Barry, T.Blackadder; S..Gordon, M.Cooksley; C.Stevenson, S.McFarland, N.Moore.

26 March 1994

Córdoba	23–38	NZ Development XV
Try: Rotondo, Dragotto; Con: Luna 2 Pen: Luna 3		Try: Barry 2 Cooke, Hewitt; Pen: Howarth 3

Club Universitario, Córdoba
Referee: José Luís Rolandi (UAR (Argentina) )

CORDOBA: J.Luna; G.Tomalino, G.Usher, I.Merlo, F.Pereyra; D.Gianantonio, J.Dragotto; D.Rotondo, S.Irazoqui, G.Piergentili; D.Pereyra (capt.), J.Simes; D.Muñoz (Sánchez), I.Ferreyra, A.Rodríguez Araya..
NZ DEVELOPMENT XV: S.Howarth; J.Wilson, A.Ieremia, S.Cottrell, P.Cooke; S.Mannix, J.Preston; J. Mitchell (capt.), L.Barry, B.Larsen; T.Blackadder, M.Cooksley; G.Slater (N.Moore), N.Hewitt, M.Allen.

29 March 1994

Cuyo	17–45	NZ Development XV
Try: Méndez; Pen: Cremaschi 3 Drop: Speroni		Try: Preston, Larsen 2 Mitchell, Cooksley; Slater; Con: Howarth 3 Pen: Howarth 3

Independiente Rivadavia Stadium, Mendoza
Referee: Ricardo Lamastra (UAR (Argentina) )

CUYO: E.Saurina; Gatti, P.Cippitelli (capt.), P.Cremaschi, M.Brandi; Speroni, A.Orri¬co; M.Bertranou, G.Nasazzi, Cassone; Marchiori, V.Bueno; F.Méndez, Pontino, Bartolin ..
NZ DEVELOPMENT XV S.Howarth; J.Wilson, John Leslie, S.Cottrell, P.Cook; S.Mannix, J.Preston; B.Larsen, J. Mitchell (capt.), L.Barry; T.Blackadder, M.Cooksley; G.Slater, N.Hewitt, M.Allen.

2 April 1994

South Selection	16–75	NZ Development XV
Try: Haddad, Rivas; Drop: Rey Saravia 2		Try: Wilson, Konia 3 Ieremia, Cooke; Howarth, Anglesley 2 Mit¬chell, Stevenson; Con: Howarth 7 Pen: Howarth 2

Club Patorozú, Trelew
Referee: Carlos Den Dulk (UAR (Argentina) )

SUR: Luppino; S.Fernandez, Maffei, Montero, Espíndola; Manson, Rey Saravia; Haddad, Rivas, O.Fernandez; Fornetti, Gadañoto; Schmidt, Giannoni, Góméz.
NZ DEVELOPMENT XV: J.Wilson; G.Konia, A.Ieremia, John Leslie, P.Cooke; S.Howarth, J.Preston; L.Barry, T.Blackadder, D.Anglesey; M.Cooksley ( J. Mitchell ), S.McFarlane; C.Stevenson, N.Hewitt, M. Allen.

5 April 1994

NW Selection	5–22	NZ Development XV
Try: García		Try: Barry; Con: Howarth; Pen: Howarth 5

Chaco For Ever, Resistencia
Referee: Sr.O.Vittar (UAR (Argentina) )

NORESTE:Gómez Coll (Scordo); Mateo, San Vicente, S.Galazzi, Meabe; Castillo Odena, Godoy; Guarnieri, Marcó, G.Galazzi; García, De Marchi (capt.); Panelli, Fretes, Gualdani.
NZ DEVELOPMENT XV: S.Howarth; G.Konia, S.Cottrell, L. Stensness, E.Clarke; S.Mannix, J.Marshall; L.Barry, J. Mitchell (capt.), B.Larsen; S.Gordon, T.Blackadder; G.Slater, S.Mc Farland, N.Moore.

9 April 1994

Buenos Aires	38–26	NZ Development XV
Try: Rivarola 2, Noriega; Con: Forrester; Drop: Forrester		Try: Cooke, Howarth; Cottrell; Con: Howarth; Pen: Howarth 3

Estadio GEBA, Buenos Aires
Referee: Santiago Borsani (UAR (Argentina) )

BUENOS AIRES: S.Salvat(capt.); H.Rivarola, E.Laborde, D.Cuesta Silva, G.Jorge; D.Forres¬ter, N.Fernandez Miranda; C.Viel, E.Camerlinckx, R.Martín; P.Sporleder, G.Llanes; E.Noriega, J.J.Angelillo, M.Corral. .
NZ DEVELOPMENT XV: S.Howarth; J.Wilson, A.Iercrnia, S.Cottrell, P.Cooke; S.Mannix, J.Preston; L.Barry, J. Mitchell (capt.), B.Larsen; S.Gordon, M.Cooksley; C.Stevenson, N.Hewitt, M.Allen.

== The Squad ==
The player in Bold were later capped for "All Blacks"

Player	Match Played	Score				Total points
Player	Match Played	tries	conv.	pen.	drop	Total points
**Shane Howarth**	4	4	21	20		122
P. Cooke	5	6				30
**Jeff Wilson**	6	5	1			27
D. Barry	7	4				20
George Konia	3	3				15
Dean Anglesey	2	2				10
Stephen Cottrell	5	2				10
Brian Larsen	5	2				10
**John Mitchell**	7	2				10
N. Moore	3	2				10
**Mark Cooksley**	5	1				5
S. Gordon	4	1				5
N. Hewitt	5	1				5
**Alama Ieremia**	4	1				5
**Justin Marshall**	2	1				5
Jon Preston	5	1				5
**Gordon Slater**	4	1				5
C. Stevenson	3	1				5
**Mark "Bull" Allen**	5					0
**Todd Blackadder**	5					0
**Simon Mannix**	5					0
John Leslie	3					0
Slade McFarland	3					0
**Eroni Clarke**	2					0
**Lee Stensness**	2					0
**Glenn Taylor**	1					0
