= 2008 Campeonato Argentino de Rugby =

64° Campeonato Argentino
- Number of teams: 24
- Champions: Buenos Aires (30th title)
- Runners-up: Tucumàn.
- Relegated: Mar del Plata

The 2008 Campeonato Argentino de Rugby was won by the selection of Buenos Aires that beat in the final the selection of Tucumàn.

== "Campeonato" ==
The eight Team participating were divided in due pools of 4. The first two of each pool admitted to semifinals, the last to play-out for relegation ("Finale descenso")

=== Pool 1 ===
1.Round
1 March	Buenos Aires	-	Cuyo	39 - 0	Buenos Aires
1 March	Córdoba	-	Mar del Plata	22 - 13	Córdoba

2.Round
8 March	Mar del Plata	-	Buenos Aires	14 - 45	Mar del Plata
8 March	Córdoba	-	Cuyo	46 - 17	Córdoba

3.Round
15 March	Buenos Aires	-	Córdoba	26 - 17	Buenos Aires
15 March	Cuyo	-	Mar del Plata	21 - 10	Mendoza

Qualified for Semifinals
to relegation play-out

Place	Team	Games				Points			Bonus	Table points
Place	Team	played	won	drawn	lost	for	against	diff.	Bonus	Table points
1	Buenos Aires	3	3	0	0	110	31	+79	3	15
2	Córdoba	3	2	0	1	85	56	+29	1	9
3	Cuyo	3	1	0	2	38	95	-57	0	4
4	Mar del Plata	3	0	0	3	37	88	-51	0	0

=== Pool 2 ===
1.Round
1 March	Tucumán	-	Rosario	40 - 11	Tucumán
1 March	Santa Fe	-	Salta	27 - 28	Santa Fe

2.Round
8 March	Salta	-	Tucumán	3 - 32	Salta
8 March	Santa Fe	-	Rosario	15 - 10	Santa Fe

3.Round
15 March	Tucumán	-	Santa Fe	46 - 11	Tucumán
15 March	Rosario	-	Salta	28 - 25	Rosario

Qualified for Semifinals
to relegation play-out

Place	Team	Games				Points			Bonus	Table points
Place	Team	played	won	drawn	lost	for	against	diff.	Bonus	Table points
1	Tucumàn	3	3	0	0	118	25	+93	3	15
2	Rosario (*)	3	1	0	2	49	80	-31	1	5
3	Santa Fè (*)	3	1	0	2	53	84	-31	1	5
4	Salta (*)	3	1	0	2	56	87	-31	1	5

(*) The second place was assigned according to the number of tries scored (Rosario 6, Santa Fè 3, Salta 1)

=== Semifinals ===
Semifinals
29 March	Buenos Aires	-	Rosario	24 - 21	Buenos Aires
29 March	Tucumán	-	Córdoba	39 - 10	Tucumán

=== Final ===
5 April 2008

Tucumán	9-10	Buenos Aires
Pen: 5' 45' 59' Diego Mas		Try: 79' Agustín Costa Repetto; Con: 80' Federico Serra; Pen: 39' Federico Serra

Lawn Tennis Club, Tucumán
Referee: Javier Mancuso (Cordóba)

Tucuman 15.Lucas Barrera Oro, 14.Aníbal Terán, 13.Ezequiel Faralle, 12.Agustín Vallejo, 11.Sebastián Ponce, 10.Diego Mas (60' Nicolás Sánchez), 9.Diego Ternavasio, 8.Agustín Guzmán (79' Rafael Garrido), 7.Nicolás Centurión, 6.Ignacio Haustein (56' Juan Pablo Lagarrigue), 5.Gabriel Pata Curello (capt), 4.Carlos Casares, 3.Bruno Cuezzo, 2.Ramón Vidal, 1.Felipe Betolli (61' Juan Ávila)
Buenos Aires: 15. Federico Serra Miras, 14. Agustín Gosio, 13. Juan Ignacio Gauthier, 12. Hernán Senillosa, 11. Pablo Gómez Cora (capt.), 10. Santiago Fernández (53` Benjamín Urdapilleta)), 9. Francisco Albarracín, 8. Alejandro Abadie, 7. Facundo López (55'Juan Pablo Mirenda), . 6. Alejandro Campos, 5. Felipe Aranguren, 4. James Stuart (53`Nahuel Neyra), 3. Francisco Lecot (53' Federico Sánchez), 2. Pablo Gambarini (64` Agustín Costa Repetto), 1. Gonzalo Begino

=== Play out ===
Play Out ("Finale Descenso")
29 March	Mar del Plata	-	Salta	12 - 27	Mar del Plata
5 April	Salta	-	Mar del Plata	39 - 10	Salta

- Champions: Buenos Aires
- Relegated: 'Mar del Plata'

== Torneo "Ascenso" ==
=== Pool North 1 ===
1.Round
1 March	Santiago	-	La Rijoa	18 - 15	Santiago del Estero
1 March	San Luis	-	Jujuy	41 - 11	San Luis

2.Round
8 March	Jujuy	-	Santiago	6 - 24	San Salvador de Jujuy
8 March	San Luis	-	La Rijoa	18 - 15	San Luis

3.Round
15 March	Santiago	-	San Luis	43 - 0	Santiago del Estero
15 March	La Rioja	-	Jujuy	15 - 42	La Rioja

Qualified for Semifinals

Place	Team	Games				Points			Bonus	Table points
Place	Team	played	won	drawn	lost	for	against	diff.	Bonus	Table points
1	Santiago	3	3	0	0	85	21	+64	0	12
2	San Luis	3	2	0	1	59	69	-10	1	9
3	Jujuy	3	1	0	2	59	80	-21	1	5
4	La Rioja	3	0	0	3	45	78	-33	1	1

=== Pool North 2 ===
1.Round
1 March	Noreste	-	Misiones	48 - 10	Resistencia
1 March	Entre Rios	-	Formosa	40 - 0	Paraná

2.Round
8 March	Formosa	-	Noreste	10 - 57	Formosa
8 March	Entre Rios	-	Misiones	22 - 6	Paraná

3.Round
15 March	Noreste	-	Entre Rios	32 - 15	Resistencia
15 March	Misiones	-	Formosa	10 - 7	Rosario

Qualified for Semifinals

Place	Team	Games				Points			Bonus	Table points
Place	Team	played	won	drawn	lost	for	against	diff.	Bonus	Table points
1	Noreste	3	3	0	0	137	35	+102	3	15
2	Entre Rios	3	2	0	1	77	38	+39	1	9
3	Misiones	3	1	0	2	26	77	-51	0	4
4	Formosa	3	0	0	3	17	107	-90	1	1

=== Pool South 1 ===
1.Round
1 March	San Juan	-	Alto Valle	19 - 19	San Juan
1 March	Sur	-	Oeste	34 - 0	Bahía Blanca

2.Round
8 March	Oeste	-	San Juan	0 - 43	Junín
8 March	Sur	-	Alto Valle	15 - 15	Bahía Blanca

3.Round
15 March	San Juan	-	Sur	32 - 22	San Juan
15 March	Alto Valle	-	Oeste	93 - 12	Neuquén

Qualified for Semifinals

Place	Team	Games				Points			Bonus	Table points
Place	Team	played	won	drawn	lost	for	against	diff.	Bonus	Table points
1	San Juan	3	2	1	0	94	41	+53	2	12
2	Alto Valle	3	1	2	0	127	46	+81	1	9'
3	Sur	3	1	1	1	71	47	+34	1	7
4	Oeste	3	0	0	3	12	170	-158	0	0

=== Pool South 2 ===
1.Round
1 March	Tierra del Fuego	-	Chubut	14 - 8	Ushuaia
1 March	Lagos del Sur	-	Austral	13 - 34	Bariloche

2.Round
8 March	Chubut	-	Austral	6 - 13	Trelew
8 March	Lagos del Sur	-	Tierra del Fuego	25 - 5	Bariloche

3.Round
15 March	Chubut	-	Austral	19 - 10	Trelew
15 March	Austral	-	Tierra del Fuego	28 - 5	Comodoro Rivadavia

Qualified for Semifinals

Place	Team	Games				Points			Bonus	Table points
Place	Team	played	won	drawn	lost	for	against	diff.	Bonus	Table points
1	Austral	3	3	0	0	75	24	+51	2	14
2	Chubut	3	1	0	2	33	37	-4	2	6
3	Lagos del Sur	3	1	0	2	48	58	-10	1	5
4	Tierra del Fuego	3	1	0	2	24	61	-37	0	4

=== Semifinals ===
Semifinals
29 March	Noreste	-	Santiago del estero	29 - 17	Resistencia
29 March	Austral	-	San Juan	12 - 26	Comodoro Rivadavia

=== Final ===
Final
5 April	Noreste	-	San Juan	11 - 7	Resistencia

- Promoted: Noreste
