= Club Tilcara =

Argentine rugby union and field hockey club, based in Paraná, Entre Ríos

(Argentina) Tilcara
- Full name: Club Tilcara
- Union: Unión Entrerriana de Rugby
- Founded: March 5, 1954; 71 years ago
- Ground(s): Paraná, Entre Ríos, Argentina
- President: Martín Cipriani
- League: Torneo Provincial
- 2018: ?
Team kit

Club Tilcara is an Argentine rugby union and field hockey club sited in Paraná, Entre Ríos. The rugby union team is affiliated to Unión Entrerriana and competes in tournaments organised by the body. The squad also plays in the Torneo del Litoral organised by the Unión de Rugby de Rosario.

== History ==
Club Tilcara was founded in 1954 by workers of the Portland cement factory of Paraná, along with former members of the Paraná Rowing Club.

The club was named honoring the Pucará de Tilcara, a pre-Inca fortification in nearby Jujuy. Other versions say that the Club Pucará had been punished with 99 years of suspension due to political issues, and Tilcara decided to adopt its name joining the Pucará's cause.

The first match played by Tilcara was against Obras Sanitarias, which was the Buenos Aires champion at the time. Obras defeated Tilcara 22-3.

For a while the club would be nicknamed "the Gypsies" as it would move from location to location during the first years of its existence. After almost twenty years of this, the club would finally acquire its own installations on Route 18, in 1975.

For the last 30 years Tilcara has been one of the most successful teams in Entre Rios, as such Tilcara takes part in the inter-provincial Torneo del Litoral. Before the creation of this tournament in 2000, the unions of Santa Fe and Entre Rios organised their own regional competition (confusingly called Torneo del Litoral as well) which Tilcara won on 4 occasions.

Tilcara's main rival is Estudiantes de Paraná.

== Titles ==
- Santa Fe / Entre Ríos Tournament (4): 1959, 1969, 1973, 1996
