= 2011 Campeonato Argentino de Rugby =

67° Campeonato Argentino
- Number of teams: 25
- Champions: Cordoba (6th title)
- Runners-up: Buenos Aires
- Relegated: Santa Fe

The 2011 Campeonato Argentino de Rugby 2011, the most important tournament for provincial teams in Argentina, and the older national tournament was played between 26 March and 23 April. The victory rose to the selection of Unión Cordobesa de Rugby led by the former Italian national team player Ramiro Pez. Like in the previous season, the teams were divided on three levels ("Campeonato", "Ascenso", "Promocional") with a promotion/relegation format between the levels.

== "Campeonato" ==
Two pools of four teams. The first two advanced semifinals, the last to relegation/promotion playoff.

=== Pool 1 ===
1ª round
26 March	Tucumàn	-	Salta	64-17	S.Miguel de T.
26 March	Cuyo	-	Mar del Plata	33-27	Mendoza

2ª round
2 April	Mar del Plata	-	Tucumàn	29-30	Mar del Plata
2 April	Cuyo	-	Salta	24-21	Mendoza

3ª round
9 April	Tucumàn	-	Cuyo	24-22	S.Miguel de T.
9 April	Salta	-	Mar del Plata	26-25	Salta

Pos	Team	Pld	W	D	L	PF	PA	PD	Pts	Qualification
1	Tucumàn	3	3	0	0	118	68	+50	6	Qualified for Semifinals
2	Cuyo	3	2	0	1	79	72	+7	4	Qualified for Semifinals
3	Salta	3	1	0	2	56	63	−7	2	
4	Mar del Plata	3	0	0	3	38	88	−50	0	Relegation/promotion play-out

=== Pool 2 ===
1ª round
26 March	Rosario	-	Buenos Aires	18-30	Rosario
26 March	Cordoba	-	Santa Fe	70-3	Córdoba

2ª round
2 April	Santa Fe	-	Rosario	15-28	Santa Fe
2 April	Cordoba	-	Buenos Aires	33-8	Córdoba

3ª round
9 April	Rosario	-	Cordoba	13-28	Rosario
9 April	Buenos Aires	-	Santa Fe	83-16	Buenos Aires

Pos	Team	Pld	W	D	L	PF	PA	PD	Pts	Qualification
1	Cordoba	3	3	0	0	131	24	+107	6	Qualified for Semifinals
2	Buenos Aires	3	2	0	1	121	77	+44	4	Qualified for Semifinals
3	Rosario	3	1	0	2	59	73	−14	2	
4	Santa Fe	3	0	0	3	34	171	−137	0	Relegation/promotion play-out

=== Semifinals ===
16 April 2011

Cordoba	49-11	Cuyo

Referee: Javier Pastrana, Buenos Aires

16 April 2011

Tucumàn	20-20 o.t.	Buenos Aires

Referee: Javier Mancuso, Córdoba

Buenos Aires qualified after overtime, having scored the first try of the match.

=== Final ===
23 April 2011

Buenos Aires	18-16	Cordoba
Try: Galli; Con: Suffern Quirno; Pen: Cruz 2, Suffern Quirno		Pen: Pez 6

Referee: Omar Alcócer, Tucumàn

’’’Buenos Aires’’’ : 15.Dimas Suffern Quirno, 14.Francisco Bosch, 13.Simón Montes, 12.Marcelo Soiza (cap), 11.Germán Villamil, 10.Valentín Cruz (18' Bautista Güemes), 9. Francisco Cubelli (68’Francisco Albarracín), 8.Alejandro Galli, 7.Cristian Etchart, 6 Juan Pablo González Bonorino
5. Gonzalo Delguy, 4.Ramiro Herrera, 3 Francisco Gómez Kodela (68' Francisco Piccinini), 2.Francisco Lecot, 1. Conrado González Bravo. Coach: Rolando Martín, Diego Cash and Gustavo Cohen.
Cordoba : 15. Gastón Revol, 14. Fernando Luna (76’ Federico Salazar), 13. Lisandro Gómez López, 12. Santiago Tobal (72’ Facundo Baglio), 11. Facundo Barrea, 10.Ramiro Pez, 9. Martín Manieri (76’ Mariano García, 8. Lucas Paschini (51-60’ Miguel Murer), 7. José Basile (cap.), 6. Rodrigo Bruno, 5. Hugo Schierano (48’ Gerardo Isaías), 4. Alejandro Allub, 3. Matías Narváez (45’ Gastón Cortés), 2. Federico Fortuna, 1. Daniel Rodríguez. Coach: Daniel Tobal, Guillermo Taleb and Javier Fiori.

== "Ascenso" ==
=== Pool 1 ===
1ª round
26 March	Noreste	-	Santiago	12-15	Resistencia
26 March	San Juan	-	Entre Rios	27-12	San Juan

2ª round
2 April	Entre Rios	-	Noreste	9-11	Paraná
2 April	San Juan	-	Santiago	41-16	Argentina

3ª round
9 April	Noreste	-	San Juan	25-15	Resistencia
9 April	Santiago	-	Entre Rios	39-20	Santiago del Estero

Pos	Team	Pld	W	D	L	PF	PA	PD	Pts	Qualification
1	San Juan	3	2	0	1	83	53	+30	4	Qualified for play-off for promotion
2	Santiago	3	2	0	1	70	73	−3	4	
3	Entre Rios	3	1	0	2	43	75	−32	2	
4	Noroeste	3	1	0	2	46	41	+5	2	Relegation/promotion play-out

- San Juan to the play-off for promotion in "Torneo Campeonato"
- Entre Rios to play-out for relegation

=== Pool 2 ===
1ª round
26 March	Alto Valle	.	Austral	46-5	Neuqeun
26 March	Sur	.	Chubut	21-25	Bahia Blanca

2ª round
2 April	Chubut	.	Alto Valle	14-25	Trelwe
2 April	Sur	.	Austral	31-14	Bahia Blanca

3ª round
9 April	Alto Valle	.	Sur	30-13	Nequeun
9 April	Austral	.	Chubut	27-35	Comodoro Rivadavia

Pos	Team	Pld	W	D	L	PF	PA	PD	Pts	Qualification
1	Alto Valle	3	3	0	0	101	32	+69	6	Qualified for play-off for promotion
2	Chubut	3	2	0	1	74	73	+1	4	
3	Sur	3	1	0	2	65	69	−4	2	
4	Austral	3	0	0	3	46	112	−66	0	Relegation/promotion play-out

- Alto Valle to the play-off for promotion in "Torneo Campeonato"
- Austral to the play-out for relegation

=== Play off for promotion in "Campeonato" ===
The winner of each pool of "ascenso" play against one of the last of the pools of "Campeonato"

16 April 2011

Mar del Plata	33-30	Alto Valle

23 April 2011

Alto Valle	16-21	Mar del Plata

- Mar del Plata remain in "Torneo Campeonato"

16 April 2011

Santa Fe	25-18	San Juan

23 April 2011

San Juan	14-6	Santa Fe

- Santa Fe relegated in "Ascenso"
- San Juan promoted in "Campeonato"

=== Relegation Play out ===
23 April 2011

Noroeste	42-20	Austral

- Austral relegated in the "Promocional" tournament

== Promocional ==
New formula: the nine teams play a tournament called "Super 9" in two days with match with reduced time All the match were played in Junin The winner of the "Copa " were promoted to "Ascenso"Finali il 2 April con promozione alla"Ascenso" della vincente della "Copa de oro"

=== First phase ===
Pool 1
31 March	Lagos del Sur	.	Formosa	21-8
31 March	San Luis	.	Formosa	22-5
31 March	San Luis	.	Lagos del Sur	0-33

Pos	Team	Pld	W	D	L	PF	PA	PD	Pts	Qualification
1	Lagos del Sur	2	2	0	0	54	8	+46	4	Qualified for "Copa de Oro"
2	San Luis	2	1	0	1	22	38	−16	2	Qualified for "Copa de Plata"
3	Formosa	2	0	0	2	13	43	−30	0	Qualified for "Copa de Bronce"

Pool 2
31 March	Andina	.	Misiones	19-0
31 March	Tierra del Fuego	.	Misiones	5-7
31 March	Andina	.	Tierra del Fuego	24-0

Pos	Team	Pld	W	D	L	PF	PA	PD	Pts	Qualification
1	Andina	2	2	0	0	43	0	+43	4	Qualified for "Copa de Oro"
2	Misiones	2	1	0	1	7	24	−17	2	Qualified for "Copa de Plata"
3	Tierra del Fuego	2	0	0	2	5	31	−26	0	Qualified for "Copa de Bronce"

Pool 3
31 March	Jujuy	.	Santa Cruz	8-8
31 March	Oeste	.	Santa Cruz	35-0
31 March	Jujuy	.	Oeste	0-15

Pos	Team	Pld	W	D	L	PF	PA	PD	Pts	Qualification
1	Oeste	2	2	0	0	50	0	+50	4	Qualified for "Copa de Oro"
2	Jujuy	2	0	1	1	8	23	−15	1	Qualified for "Copa de Plata"
3	Santa Cruz	2	0	1	1	8	43	−35	1	Qualified for "Copa de Bronce"

=== Copa de Oro ===
Copa de Oro
2 April	Andina	.	Lagos del Sur	12-11
2 April	Oeste	.	Lagos del Sur	12-3
2 April	Andina	.	Oeste	3-0

Pos	Team	Pld	W	D	L	PF	PA	PD	Pts	Promotion
1	Andina	2	2	0	0	15	11	+4	4	Promoted to "Ascenso"
2	Oeste	2	1	0	1	12	6	+6	2	
3	Lagos del Sur	2	0	0	2	14	24	−10	0	

- Andina promoted to the Tournament "Ascenso" 2012.

=== Copa de Plata ===
Copa de Plata
2 April	Misiones	.	San Luis	21-0
2 April	Jujuy	.	San Luis	34-0
2 April	Misiones	.	Jujuy	12-10

Pos	Team	Pld	W	D	L	PF	PA	PD	Pts
4	Misiones	2	2	0	0	33	10	+23	4
5	Jujuy	2	1	0	1	44	12	+32	2
6	San Luis	2	0	0	2	0	55	−55	0

=== Copa de bronce ===
Copa de Bronce
2 April	Formosa	.	Tierra del Fuego	14-31
2 April	Formosa	.	Santa Cruz	5-36
2 April	Tierra del Fuego	.	Santa Cruz	9-6

Pos	Team	Pld	W	D	L	PF	PA	PD	Pts
7	Tierra del Fuego	2	2	0	0	40	20	+20	4
8	Santa Cruz	2	1	0	1	42	14	+28	2
9	Formosa	2	0	0	2	19	67	−48	0
