= Emiliano Boffelli =

Argentine rugby union player

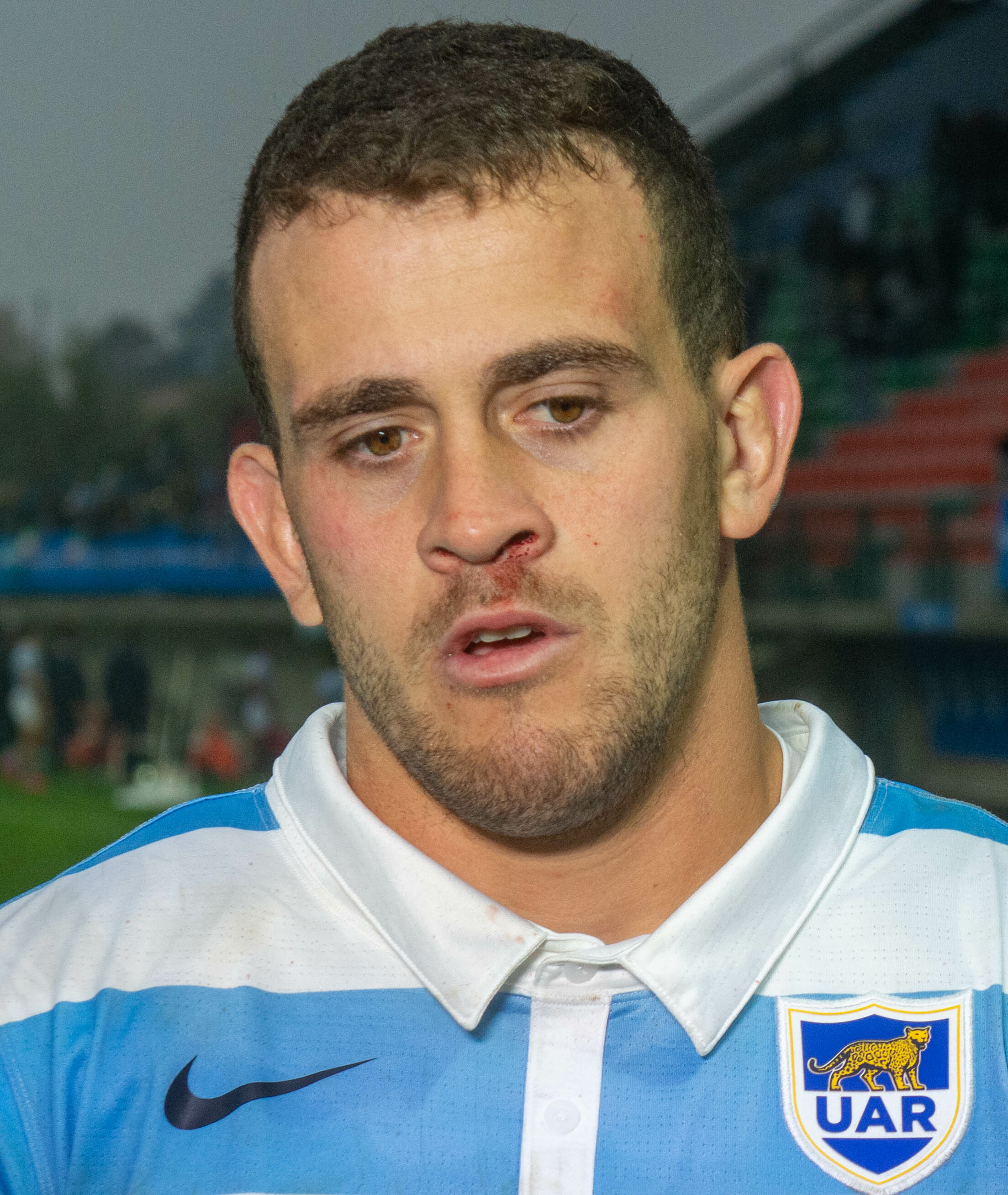
- Boffelli representing Argentina during the 2022 November Internationals
- Born: 16 January 1995 (age 31) Rosario, Argentina
- Height: 1.92 m (6 ft 4 in)
- Weight: 95.5 kg (211 lb; 15 st 1 lb)

Rugby union career
- Position(s): Wing, Fullback
- Current team: Capibaras
Senior career
Years	Team	Apps	(Points)
2015	Pampas XV	4	(0)
2015	Duendes	3	(0)
2016–2020	Jaguares	54	(117)
2020–2021	Racing 92	4	(5)
2021−2026	Edinburgh	39	(286)
2026−	Capibaras	0	(0)
- Correct as of 22 April 2026
International career
Years	Team	Apps	(Points)
2012	Argentina U18	1	(0)
2013	Argentina U19	3	(77)
2013−2015	Argentina U20	19	(65)
2015–	Argentina	59	(343)
- Correct as of 27 October 2023

Emiliano Boffelli (born 16 January 1995) is an Argentine professional rugby union player who plays as a wing or fullback for Capibaras XV in the Super Rugby Americas competition. He previously played forUnited Rugby Championship club Edinburgh and has represented the Argentina national team.

== Club career ==
Boffelli was named in the Jaguares squad for their first Super Rugby campaign in 2016 in which he earned 11 caps and scored three tries. After playing for Racing 92 in France he joined Edinburgh Rugby in July 2021.

== International career ==
Boffelli represented Argentina at both Under 18 and 19 level before being selected in the Under-20 sides which competed in the World Championships in 2013, 2014 and 2015. In 2015, he also turned out five times for Argentine representative side the Pampas XV on their Pacific Rim tour.

In 2017, Boffelli made his Test debut for the Argentina national team in a match against England.
