= 2004 Campeonato Argentino de Rugby =

60° Campeonato Argentino de Mayores
- Champions: Cuyo (1st title)
- Runners-up: Buenos Aires.

The Campeonato Argentino de Rugby 2004 was won for the first time by the selection of Cuyo, (Mondoza).

== Campeonato ==
No relegation, the next year the tournament returned to an eight-team formula.

	CUY	BA	ROS	COR	SAL	NOE
Cuyo	––––	24-26	41-32	30-12	43-17	43-10
Buenos Aires	26-24	––––	18-24	29-29	34-13	60-29
Rosario	32-41	24-18	––––	13-13	39-21	68-10
Córdoba	12-30	29-29	13-13	––––	26-26	29-23
Salta	17-43	13-34	21-39	26-26	––––	48-29
Noreste	10-43	29-60	10-68	23-29	29-48	––––

Place	Team	Games				Points			Table points
Place	Team	played	won	drawn	lost	for	against	diff.	Table points
1	Cuyo	5	4	0	1	181	97	84	8
2	Buenos Aires	5	3	1	1	167	119	48	7
3	Rosario	5	3	1	1	176	103	73	7
4	Córdoba	5	1	3	1	109	121	-12	5
5	Salta	5	1	1	3	125	171	-46	3
6	Noreste	5	0	0	5	101	248	-147	0

== Ascenso ==
Due to the new format for year 2005 (eight teams in "Campeonato" instead of six, and merging of "Ascenso" ed "Estimulo", there were two promotions and no relations.

=== Pool 1 ===
	MdP	AV	SUR	OES
Mar del Plata	––––	26-8	21-15	63-8
Alto Valle	8-26	––––	21-13	51-19
Sur	15-21	13-21	––––	42-20
Oeste	8-63	19-51	20-42	––––

Qualified for Semifinals
Relegated

Place	Team	Games				Points			Table points
Place	Team	played	won	drawn	lost	for	against	diff.	Table points
1	Mar del Plata	3	3	0	0	110	31	79	6
2	Alto Valle	3	2	0	1	80	58	22	4
3	Sur	3	1	0	2	70	62	8	2
4	Oeste	3	0	0	3	47	156	-109	0

=== Pool 2 ===
	TUC	SFE	SJN	ER
Tucumán	––––	37-28	39-8	38-30
Santa Fe	28-37	––––	27-20	37-7
San Juan	8-39	20-27	––––	41-6
Entre Rios	30-38	7-37	6-41	––––

Qualified for Semifinals
Relegated

Place	Team	Games				Points			Table points
Place	Team	played	won	drawn	lost	for	against	diff.	Table points
1	Tucumán	3	3	0	0	114	66	48	6
2	Santa Fe	3	2	0	1	92	64	28	4
3	San Juan	3	1	0	2	69	72	-3	2
4	Entre Rios	3	0	0	3	43	116	-73	0

=== Semifinals ===
Semifinals
27 March	Mar Del Plata	-	Santa Fè	27 - 23
27 March	Tucuman	-	Alta Valle	84 - 8

=== Final ===
1.Turno
3 April	Mar del Plata	-	Tucuman	20 - 45

- Tucumán and Mar del Plata promoted to "Campeonato"

== Estimulo ==
Due to the reorder for next season, all the teams were promoted to "Ascenso"

=== Pool 1 ===
	SdE	MIS	FOR	JUJ	LR
Santiago del Estero	––––	37-31	31-12	32-12	89-15
Misiones	31-37	––––	19-10	50-24	57-0
Formosa	12-31	10-19	––––	37-28	60-17
Jujuy	12-32	24-50	28-37	––––	19-15
La Rioja	15-89	0-57	17-60	15-19	––––

Place	Team	Games				Points			Table points
Place	Team	played	won	drawn	lost	for	against	diff.	Table points
1	Santiago del Estero	4	4	0	0	189	70	119	8
2	Misiones	4	3	0	1	157	71	86	6
3	Formosa	4	2	0	2	119	95	24	4
4	Jujuy	4	1	0	3	83	134	-51	2
5	La Rioja	4	0	0	4	47	225	-178	0

=== Pool 2 ===
	CEN	AUS	CHU
UR del Centro	––––	12-12	18-3
Austral	12-12	––––	12-10
Chubut	3-18	10-12	––––

Place	Team	Games				Points			Table points
Place	Team	played	won	drawn	lost	for	against	diff.	Table points
1	Centro	2	1	1	0	30	15	15	3
2	Austral	2	1	1	0	24	22	2	3
3	Chubut	2	0	0	2	13	30	-17	0
