= Rugby union in Argentina =

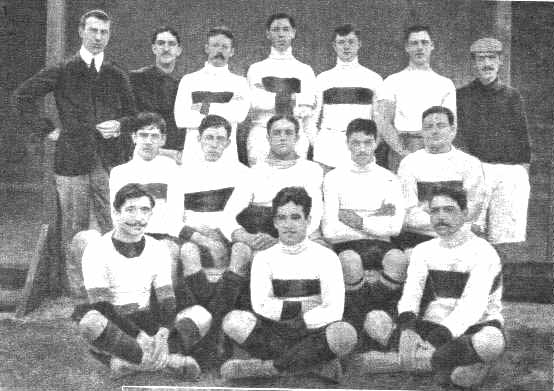
- Centro de Estudiantes de Ingeniería, the first team formed by Argentine-born players.
- Country: Argentina
- Governing body: Argentine Rugby Union
- National team: Argentina
- First played: 1873; 153 years ago
- Registered players: 110,000 (2013)

Club competitions
- List: Super Rugby; Nacional de Clubes; Campeonato Argentino; Regional Championships

International competitions
- List: The Rugby Championship; Americas Rugby Cup; Rugby World Cup; Rugby World Cup Sevens; Sevens World Series; Women's Rugby World Cup; World Rugby Women's Sevens Series

Rugby union in Argentina is a hugely popular team sport. The first rugby match played in the country dates back to 1873, as the game was introduced by the British. The Argentina national team, sometimes referred to as the Pumas, have competed at the Rugby World Cup, and are considered a tier one nation by the sport's governing body, World Rugby.

== Governing body ==
The Argentine Rugby Union (UAR) was formed in 1899 as the "River Plate Rugby Union", 26 years after the first rugby match had been played. It was affiliated to the English Rugby Football Union until 1932.

The union is a member of World Rugby with two seats and three votes on that body's Executive Council. The UAR is one of the oldest rugby unions in the world. The union became a member of the International Rugby Football Board, later known as the International Rugby Board and now as World Rugby, after being invited to the inaugural Rugby World Cup in 1987.

== Popularity ==
Rugby enjoys widespread popularity in Argentina, most especially in the Greater Buenos Aires urban area, which boasts more than eighty rugby clubs, and Tucumán Province.

While rugby in Argentina is still largely amateur, there are many professional players. Prior to the country's entry into Super Rugby in 2016, national team members played primarily in European leagues, such as England's Premiership and France's Top 14. Today, top players continue to feature prominently in European competitions or represent domestic professional franchises in the Super Rugby Americas championship.

=== Attendances ===
The Argentine rugby union club with the highest average home attendance per year:

Season	League	Best club	Best club average
2017	Super Rugby	Jaguares	8,989
2016	Super Rugby	Jaguares	12,836

Source: League page on Wikipedia

== History ==
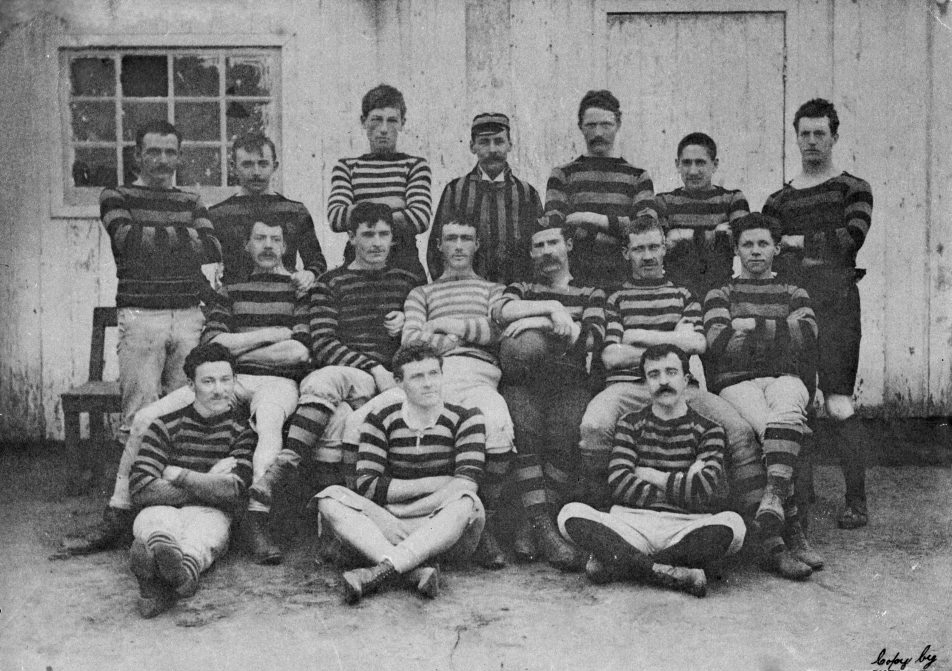
Rosario A.C. squad of 1884, the oldest photo of a rugby team in Argentina

Rugby union began to be played in Argentina in 1873, exclusively by the resident British people to begin with. The first rugby union match in Argentina was played that same year in the Buenos Aires Cricket Club Ground, located in the Palermo neighbourhood, where the Galileo Galilei planetarium is located today. Both teams (called "Bancos" and "Ciudad" for the occasion) were formed by members of the BACC and they play a mix between association and rugby football. Bancos field 11 players while Ciudad fielded 13. On 24 June 1873, another match was contested in Flores, Buenos Aires, between "Inglaterra" and "El Mundo". After three hours of play, the game ended in a scoreless tie.

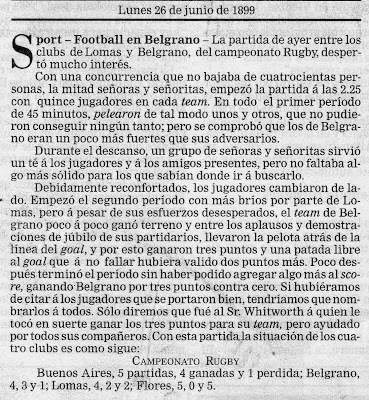
One of the matches played in the first Torneo de la URBA championship in 1899, as covered by La Nación newspaper

The first rugby match under the laws of rugby union was played on 14 May 1874 between the Buenos Aires Football Club (formed in 1867 and regarded as the first club in Argentina to practise any form of football). Teams were unnamed and chronicles referred to them as "team of Mr. Trench" and "team of Mr. Hogg".

Another Buenos Aires F.C., formed in 1886 to play rugby exclusively and predecessor of current Buenos Aires Cricket & Rugby Club, played its first match on 24 June v a team of Ferrocarril del Sud at the Flores Old Ground. It was won by the railway team by a goal, a try and 3 "touch downs" to one try.

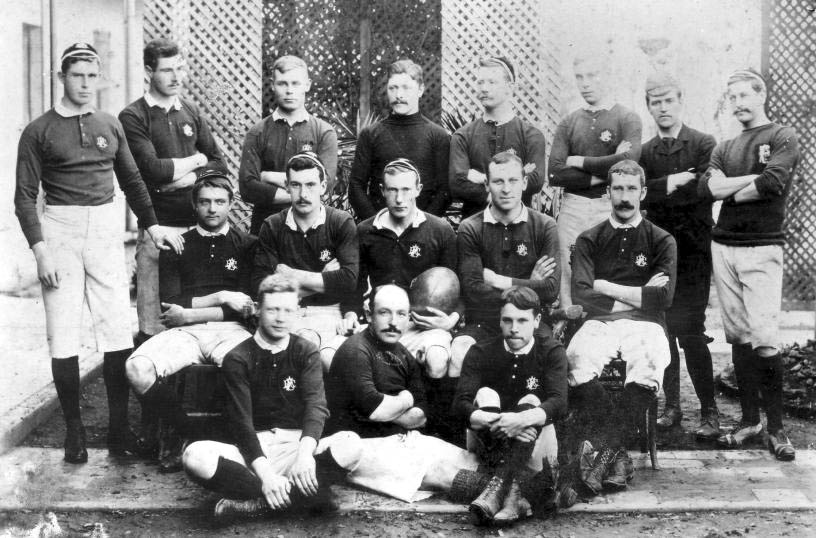
Buenos Aires FC of 1892. It was formed in 1886 to play rugby exclusively

On 29 June 1886, it is recorded that Buenos Aires F.C. and Rosario A.C. played the first inter-clubs match in Plaza Jewell, Rosario. The line-ups were: Rosario: C.E. Baines, W. Graham, A. Musgrove, A. Williamson, R.C. Baines (captain), A. Dickenson, Boland, Geary, E.D. Graham, Hall, Hanckel, Parry, Smyth, Topping, Towse. Buenos Aires: G.E. Gunson, F.J. Bennett, W.R. S. Baikie (captain), J.C. Hutchings, J. Nisbet, A. H. Scott, W.P. Drabble, J. Earnshaw, A. Lace, R. Barton, J. Paterson, A. Hughes, J.P. Simpson, R.W. Anderson, W.H. Stuart. The match was won by Rosario by 3–0 with a try scored by A. Dickenson.

It is believed that Lomas A.C. and Flores A.C. were the following clubs to form their own rugby teams, while Quilmes A.C. formed its squad in early 1900s.

Early rugby was not immune to political problems either. An 1890 game in Buenos Aires resulted in both teams, and all 2,500 spectators being arrested. National president Juárez Celman was particularly paranoid after the Revolution of the Park in the city earlier in the year, and the police had suspected that the match was in fact a political meeting.

In 1899, four clubs from Buenos Aires (Buenos Aires, Belgrano, Flores and Lomas) and one from Rosario (Rosario A.C.) got together to form "The River Plate Rugby Union". That same year the Union organised the first club championship (currently Torneo de la URBA), which was won by Lomas.

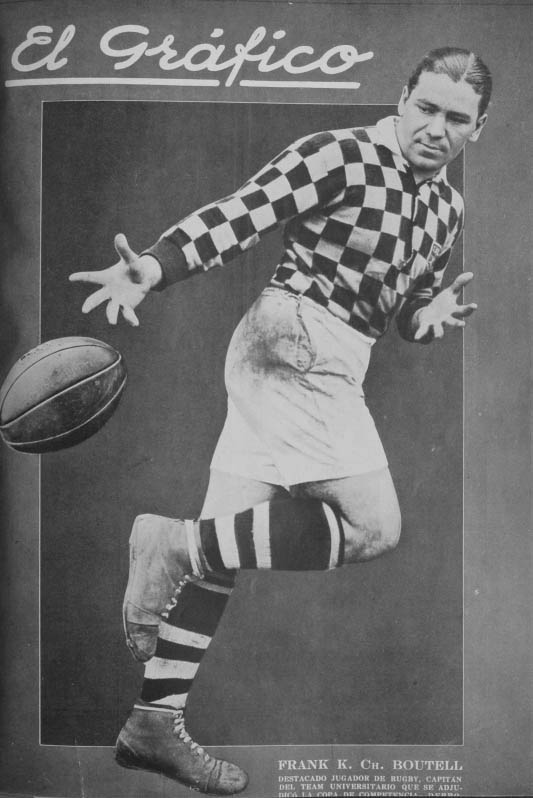
Frank Chevallier Boutell, a notable Argentine player of Club Universitario

This body, one of the oldest rugby unions in the world, later became known as the Argentine Rugby Union (UAR), which became a member of the International Rugby Board (IRB) only after being invited to the inaugural Rugby World Cup in 1987.

From the founding date until 1903, the only teams taking part in tournaments had been founded by English natives or their descendants. Only they knew the rules of the game and their families were from the high society. It was only in 1904 when the first team formed by "criollos" made its appearance, named "Centro de Estudiantes de la Facultad de Ingeniería". Some players of that team were the Newbery Brothers, Martín Miguens, Alberto Lagos, Luis Duhau, Mariano Paunero and Germán Dates.

Although rugby went professional in the mid-1990s, the domestic competition in Argentina has largely remained amateur. That has ensured large numbers of Argentines playing overseas, particularly in European competitions, though these players are still eligible for the national team, and make up a large amount of the side.

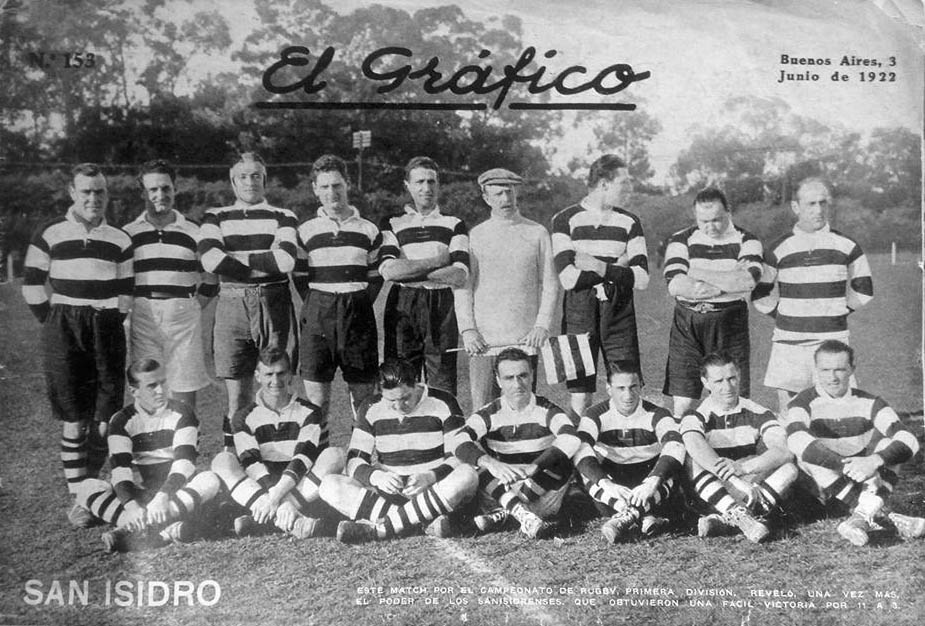
San Isidro (pictured in 1922) won a record of 13 consecutive titles (1917–30)

It was originally dominated by the British community in Argentina, but unlike certain other regions, it became successfully transplanted to the local population. For example, in its early days the River Plate Rugby Union (the ancestor of today's national organisation), had a membership whose surnames portrayed their English and Scottish origins - such as Anderson, Baikie, Bellamy, Brodie, Corry-Smith, Elliot, Jacobs, Leicht, Taylor, Thurn.

Tucuman is a heartland for the sport, where supporters are passionate, and often burn the opposition's flag on the terraces. This is a region has been known to produce many of Argentina's forwards.

One of Argentina's main problems has been its geographical isolation, and despite Chile, Uruguay and to a much lesser extent, Brazil playing the game, Argentina towers above them, and has not had a reasonable match on the continent. Its first contact with a team outside the continent was in 1910, when the British and Irish Lions led by J. Raphael toured Argentina, winning all six matches, scoring 213 points, and conceding a mere 31. The British Lions returned to Argentina in 1927, that time led by David MacMyn, playing 9 matches, 4 of them against the Argentina national team. Other rivals of the Lions during the tour included CA San Isidro, Buenos Aires FC, and Gimnasia y Esgrima de Buenos Aires. The Lions would make a third tour on Argentina in 1936, playing 10 matches.

Other team that toured on Argentina were the Junior Springboks in 1932, that won all eight matches played.

During the post-War period, the France national team toured Argentina in 1954 playing several matches v. local clubs and combined teams and even the Argentine side. A total of 14 matches were played by France in the country, winning all of them.

The national team also turned its sights overseas, touring South Africa in 1965, and despite an underwhelming performance, they contacted Izak van Heerden, the Natal coaching genius who would revolutionize Argentine rugby in the late 1960s. Argentina also saw the emergence of Hugo Porta, who is widely considered one of the greatest Argentine player of all time.

In the 1970s, major Argentine rugby clubs included Rosario A.C., Buenos Aires, Gimnasia y Esgrima de Buenos Aires and both teams from San Isidro, C.A. San Isidro ("CASI"), and San Isidro Club (mostly known for their acronyms, "CASI" and "SIC" respectively).

Argentina has long been seen as the biggest power outside the Six Nations and the Tri Nations; between 1981 and 1990 in four tests, England won only two out of four, and Scotland lost both tests on their 1994 tour.

== Competitions ==
=== Club rugby ===
Argentina is divided into 24 provincial unions which all organise their own provincial club competitions. Since the 1990s, some provincial unions have started organising regional club competitions with neighbouring unions in order to raise the standards of rugby and make their clubs more competitive. An example of this is the Torneo del Litoral, which is organised by the unions of Rosario, Santa Fe and Entre Ríos.

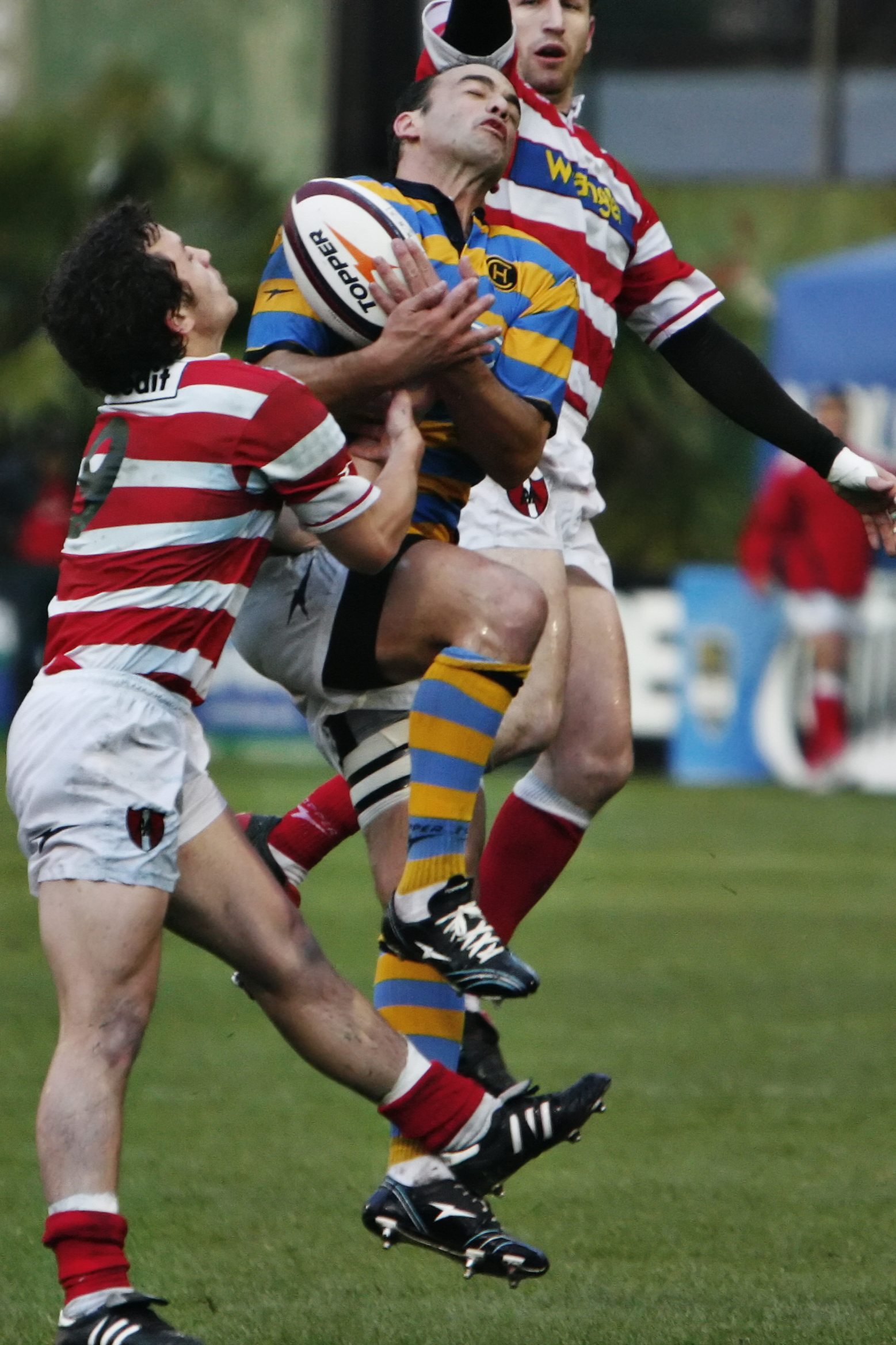
Alumni and Hindú disputing the 2007 Torneo de la URBA final.

Historically, club rugby in Argentina has been dominated by clubs from the powerful Unión de Rugby de Buenos Aires (URBA) and the URBA championship was seen as the strongest club competition in the country. In recent years however, clubs from outside Buenos Aires have closed the gap with URBA clubs. To reflect this the Nacional de Clubes was created in 1993. Originally the competition involved 16 clubs from all over the country but the formula was modified in 2009.

That year a new competition was created, the Torneo del Interior. This competition involves the best ranked clubs from all regional tournaments outside of Buenos Aires. With the creation of this tournament, the Nacional de Clubes was overhauled. From 2009 on, only 4 clubs qualify for the Nacional - instead of 16 - and the competitions starts directly at the semi-finals stage. The 4 clubs qualifying for the Nacional's semi-finals are the two finalists of both the Interior and URBA tournaments, with the URBA winner meeting the Interior runner-up and vice versa. The first winner of the new and improved Nacional de Clubes was Rosario's Duendes Rugby Club, who beat Buenos Aires' Hindú Club in the final.

=== Representative rugby ===
The Campeonato Argentino is contested by representative teams of the 24 unions that exist within the UAR. It is divided into two competitions, the 8-team Zona Campeonato and the 16-team Zona Ascenso. The winner of the Zona Ascenso earns a place in the following years' Zona Campeonato, replacing the last-placed team of the latter competition.

=== International rugby ===
Argentina had often been linked with joining Australia, New Zealand and South Africa in the Super Rugby Union, possibly as two provinces. Following the hosting of the 2011 Rugby World Cup to New Zealand, who Argentina voted for, rugby figures within Argentina claimed that New Zealand could be helping out the country more, rather than just giving them an All Blacks test (which was actually arranged prior to the 2011 result). Some Argentines were under the impression that New Zealand should be helping them gain entry into Southern Hemisphere competitions, ala Super 14 and the Tri Nations Series. Allegedly, the New Zealand Rugby Union pointed to them not having "box office appeal" for their current non-involvement in the competitions. NZRU chief executive Chris Moller, saying that there was no agreement between the nations, did however offer the UAR advice on how to improve its domestic competition and agreed to see All Black camp specialists to provide coaching in Buenos Aires when the All Blacks played the Pumas in June 2006.

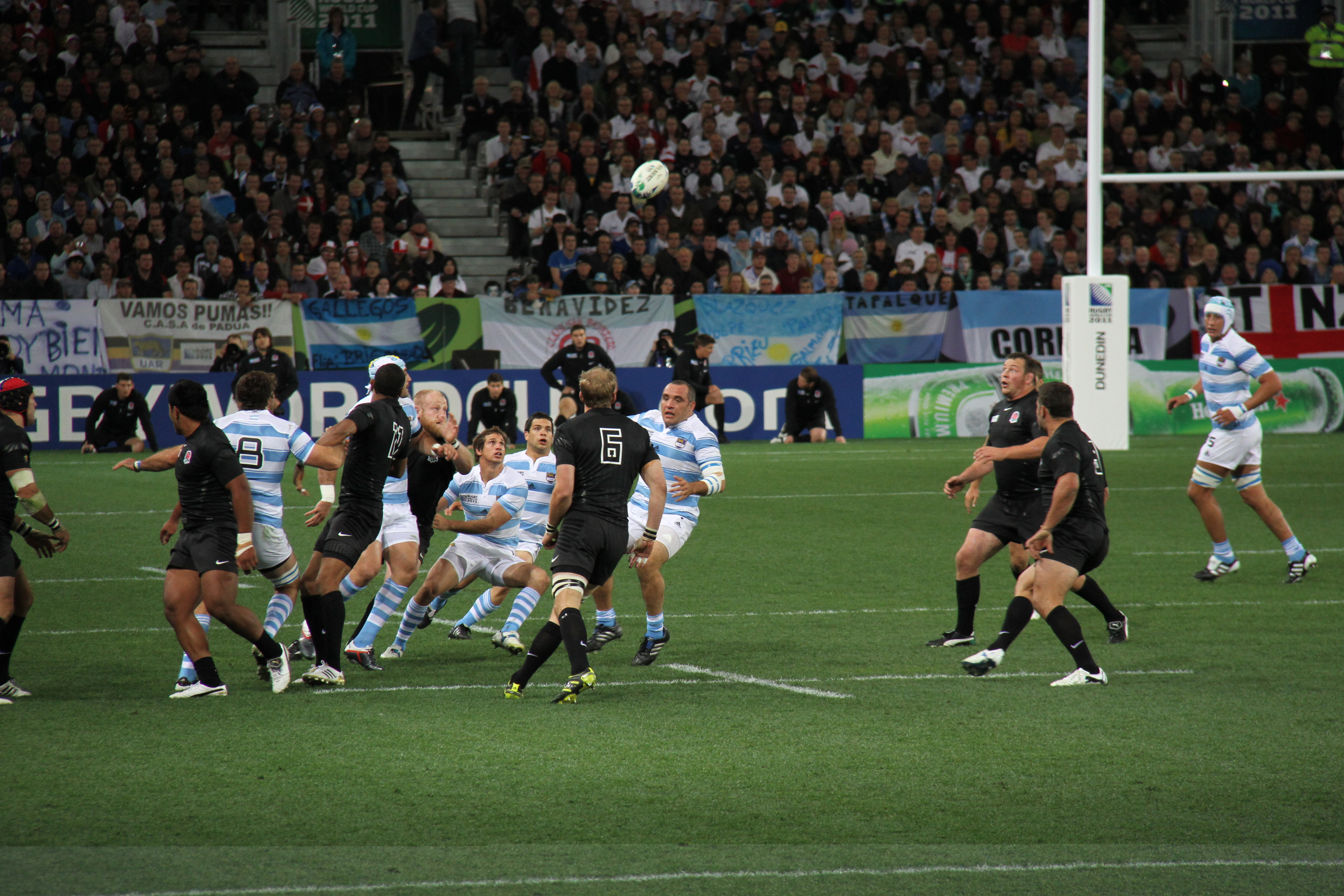
Argentina facing England at the 2011 Rugby World Cup.

In the wake of Argentina's series win over Wales in the 2006 mid-year Tests, and realising that the Tri Nations would apparently be a closed shop until at least 2009, Pumas captain Agustín Pichot publicly urged that Argentina be added to Europe's Six Nations Championship. In an interview with the Western Mail of Cardiff, he pointed out that all of the starting 15 that defeated Wales would play the 2006–07 season in Europe. Pichot added,

We, as a group of players, would be prepared to play our home games in Europe if we were able to join the Six Nations. I beg you to let us take part in it. What Italy did last season was great for the sport and I'm sure we could do the same.

The Sunday Times of London reported in February 2007 that the IRB was brokering a deal with SANZAR, the body that organises the Tri Nations, to admit Los Pumas to the competition as early as 2008. The story noted that logistical issues, specifically the distance between Argentina and Europe plus fixture congestion in Northern Hemisphere rugby, caused the Six Nations to balk at admitting Argentina. The IRB was apparently convinced that the Tri Nations was the proper place for a Southern Hemisphere team, and reportedly found South Africa strongly supporting the move and Australia not opposed. The Sunday Times indicated that the biggest stumbling block could be the UAR itself, "some of whose members are deeply attached to amateurism." Eventually, the IRB admitted its attempt to get the Pumas into a major competition would be unsuccessful until at least 2010, when the key media contract between SANZAR and News Corporation expires. An IRB spokesman cited fixture congestion in the Southern Hemisphere and the lack of a professional structure in Argentina as additional reasons for the demise of a potential deal.

In November 2007, in the wake of the Pumas' third-place finish in the 2007 Rugby World Cup, the team's future status was a key topic of discussion at an IRB conference on the future worldwide growth of the sport. The decisions made at the conference regarding Los Pumas were:

- Starting in 2008, the Pumas will play more annual Tests, increasing from the previous six Tests per year to nine by 2010.
- By 2010, the team will play four Tests in the June Test window, three in November, and two during the Six Nations window in February and March.
- Between 2008 and 2012, Argentina will develop a professional structure within the country, with the goal of having the majority of Argentine professionals playing at home. Sometime around 2012, Los Pumas will then supposedly be "fully integrated into the Southern top-flight Rugby playing structure" (read "Tri Nations").

However, NZRU deputy chief executive Steve Tew subsequently expressed doubts that a professional domestic competition in Argentina would be sufficiently viable within the following 10 years to retain elite players in South America, despite all the good intentions and funding of the IRB. In December 2007 the 23 provincial delegates at an Extraordinary Meeting of the UAR voted unanimously to keep their domestic league amateur, although the Pumas selection pool would be centrally contracted as professionals to the UAR. This decision was almost instantly assailed by Pichot, who told The Daily Telegraph of London,

It is unbelievable what is going on at the moment. The Argentinian directors change their minds every day, and in those conditions it is difficult to get anything done. It is a disgrace.

The UAR, with considerable assistance from the IRB, continued to work towards building a professional structure in the country. Pichot, formerly critical of the UAR, accepted an invitation to join a "High Performance Board" to help the country achieve its ultimate goal of a place in a major international tournament. In September 2009, SANZAR announced that it had issued a provisional invitation to Argentina to join an expanded "Four Nations" tournament starting in 2012. The main condition for Argentine participation is that the UAR can ensure the availability of its top players for the Four Nations; the deal is also dependent on approval from broadcasters and financial considerations. Tew, skeptical of Argentina's ability to develop a professional structure only two years earlier, was impressed with the country's progress in 2009, stating "They have made a huge amount of progress in the past six months ... not long ago they were facing bankruptcy and they have come a long way."

Argentina's increasing engagement with the Tri Nations was further cemented in December 2009, when the South African Rugby Union announced that an Argentine team would join the national developmental competition, the Vodacom Cup, starting in 2010. The team, known as Pampas XV, was initially expected to be based in Stellenbosch in the Western Cape, but ultimately found a home in Potchefstroom. Pampas XV won the competition in its second season of 2011.

Also in 2011, the IRB also helped to accommodate Argentina's Four Nations entry by making a major change to its Regulation 9, which governs the release of players for international duty. Before the change, Argentina internationals only had to be released for the June and November Tests, as the Pumas were not in a major hemispheric competition. The new Regulation 9 introduces a new release period, from late August to early October, for all four major Southern Hemisphere powers. SANZAR chief Greg Peters noted at the time that this change would make Argentine internationals less attractive to Northern Hemisphere clubs.

On 14 September 2009, Argentina was formally admitted into the Tri-Nations competition (which will henceforth be renamed The Rugby Championship) from 2012 onwards.

== National team ==
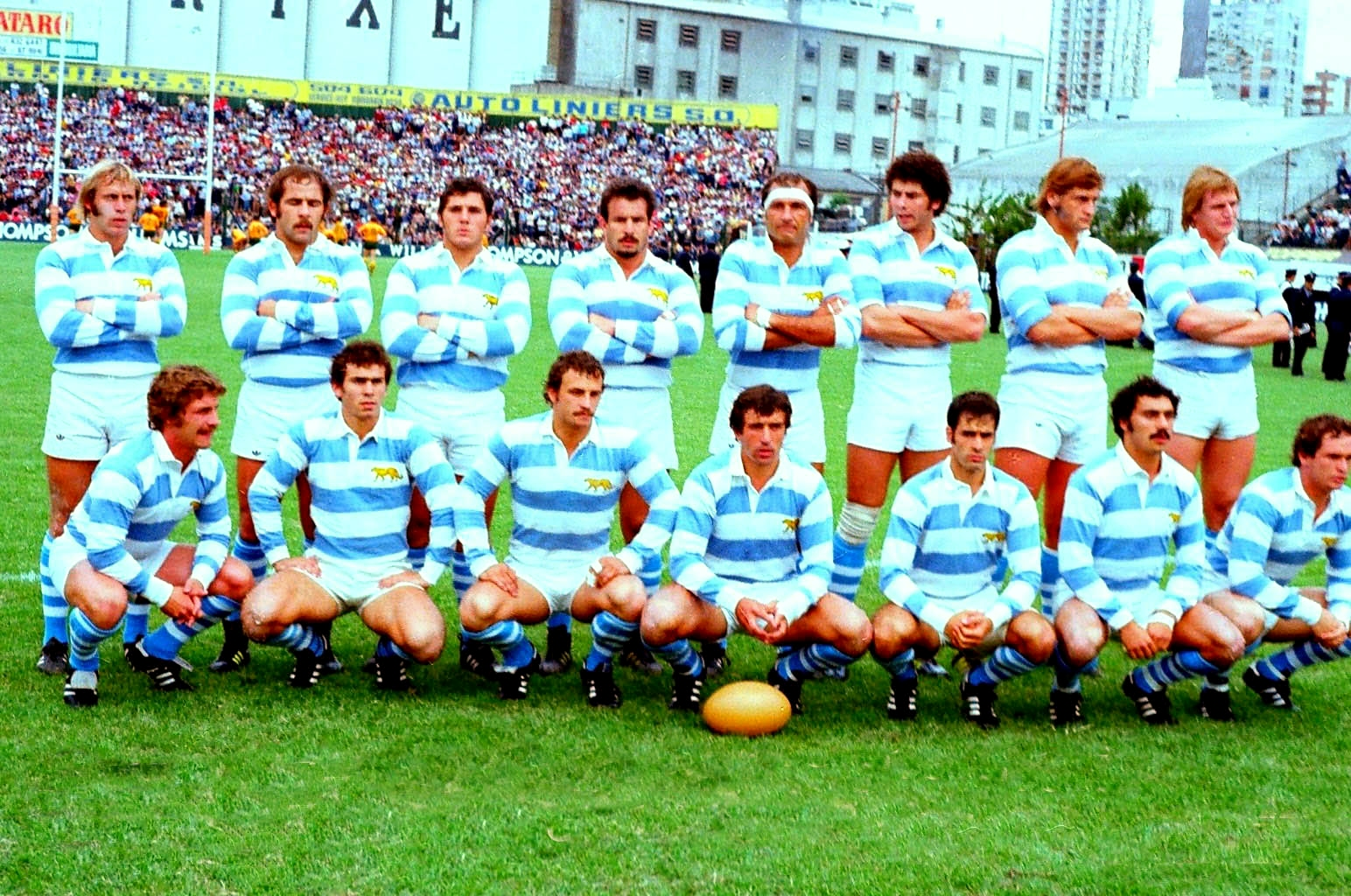
Los Pumas, the national senior team, pictured before a match in 1979.

The national team are nicknamed Los Pumas and wear blue and white jerseys. They are considered a top tier nation by World Rugby, and have competed in the Rugby Championship since 2012.

Argentina played their first international on June 12, 1910, against a touring British Isles, losing 28 points to three. Argentina also competed at the first ever Rugby World Cup held in Australia and New Zealand in 1987. Grouped with the All Blacks, Fiji and Italy, Argentina won their game against the Italians, but finished at the bottom of their pool on points difference. Subsequent World Cups saw similar results, in the 1999 tournament however, Argentina finished second in their pool and made it to the quarter-finals. Argentine Gonzalo Quesada was also the top scorer of the tournament. The 2003 Rugby World Cup saw them finish third in pool A. The Nations Cup is a tournament involving the country's "A" national side, now branded as Argentina XV, and was first held in 2006.

In recent years Argentina have proven themselves capable of scaring and more than occasionally defeating traditional rugby giants. As of 2020, they have defeated every Tier 1 rugby nation. Argentina also drew with the British & Irish Lions in 2005 in Cardiff, notable as a 'moral victory' for the Pumas, who were missing over two dozen players and had to resort to dragging players out of retirement to play. Heading into the 2007 Rugby World Cup, Argentina's most recent Six Nations scalps were a pair of wins over an experimental Ireland side and one over Italy in 2007. In the World Cup itself, Argentina beat the host nation, France, in the opening game and Ireland in a later pool match. The Pumas went on to defeat Scotland in the quarterfinals before losing to eventual champions South Africa in the semifinals. They met France again in the bronze final and won again, this time by a convincing 34–10 margin. As of August 2025, Argentina is ranked seventh in the World Rugby Rankings, having beaten the British & Irish Lions 28–24 on June 20, 2025, in Dublin.

== Players ==
Probably the best known players are:

- Hugo Porta, a member of both the International Rugby and World Rugby Halls of Fame who played during the 1970s and 1980s.
- Past Pumas captain Agustín Pichot. Member of the World Rugby Hall of Fame, and current vice chairman of the World Rugby Council.
- Past Pumas captain Felipe Contepomi and his teammate Juan Martín Hernández, both of whom made the five-man shortlist for the IRB International Player of the Year award in 2007. Contepomi has since been inducted to the World Rugby Hall of Fame.
- Former player Marcelo Loffreda, who coached the Pumas to third place in the 2007 Rugby World Cup before leaving to take up the head coaching job at English club Leicester Tigers.
- Former player and past Pumas head coach Santiago Phelan.
- Stade Français coach Gonzalo Quesada.

== Rugby sevens national team ==
The Argentina national rugby sevens team plays in the IRB Sevens World Series. Argentina is scheduled to host an annual tournament in that competition beginning with the 2013–2014 season.

== Women's rugby ==
Although Argentina's women's team are in their infancy and have not yet played a test match, they have been playing international sevens rugby since 2004. (Current playing record).

== Media coverage ==
ESPN Latin America show all of the national team's internationals as well as games from the domestic league. A magazine show is also broadcast on the channel. Additionally many international rugby union competitions and internationals are broadcast by Fox Sports en Latinoamérica, for example, the Super Rugby competition between provincial sides from Australia, New Zealand and South Africa, as well as South Africa's domestic competition, the Currie Cup, and New Zealand's ITM Cup. Fox also broadcasts numerous internationals, such as the Tri Nations Series, as well as other tests and tours.

== Social attitudes and controversy ==
In recent years, rugby culture in Argentina has become increasingly associated to violent acts, as well as racist, sexist and homophobic attitudes. Prominent cases such as the murder of Ariel Malvino in 2006, and most recently the murder of Fernando Báez Sosa in 2020—all perpetrated by rugby players amateur—have been highlighted by Argentine media as examples of the "violent" nature of the country's rugby culture. Following Báez Sosa's murder, former national rugby team captain Agustín Pichot stated that rugby culture had "naturalized violence".

== Stadiums used for rugby union ==
The list contains Argentine stadiums that have been used for rugby union (only stadiums with a capacity of 10,000 or higher are included):

Stadium	Capac.	City	Province	Open.	First rugby	Image
Único Diego Maradona	53,000	La Plata	Buenos Aires	2003	2003	
José Amalfitani	49,540	Buenos Aires	(autonomous city)	1943	1986	
Malvinas Argentinas	42,000	Mendoza	Mendoza	1978	2007	
Monumental José Fierro	35,200	San Miguel de Tucumán	Tucumán	1922	1995	
Único Madre de Ciudades	30,000	Santiago del Estero	Santiago del Estero	2021	2022	
San Juan del Bicentenario	25,286	San Juan	San Juan	2011	2011	
Gigante de Arroyito	41,465	Rosario	Santa Fe	1926	2008 (Note: Last match hosted was in 2013.)	
Más Monumental	84,567	Buenos Aires	(autonomous city)	1938	2000 (Note: Last match hosted was in 2002.)	

== See also ==
- Lists of stadiums

== Additional bibliography ==
- A Game for Hooligans: The History of Rugby Union, by Huw Richards (Mainstream Publishing, Edinburgh, 2007, ISBN 978-1-84596-255-5)
