= Capibaras XV =

Argentine rugby union team

(Argentina) Capibaras XV
- Full name: Los Capibaras XV
- Founded: 2025; 1 year ago
- Location: Argentine Littoral, Argentina
- Ground(s): Jockey Club de Rosario, Rosario, Argentina
- Coach: Nicolás Galatro
- Captain(s): Manuel Bernstein; Ignacio Gandini
- League: Super Rugby Americas
Team kit

Capibaras XV is a professional rugby union team based in the Argentine Littoral provinces, Argentina. The team was founded in 2025 as the fourth Argentine team to compete in the Super Rugby Americas competition.

== Beginnings ==
The side was founded in September 2025 ahead of beginning competition in the 2026 Super Rugby Americas season as the fourth Argentine province after Pampas XV (representing then Buenos Aires region), Dogos XV (representing the Córdoba region) and Tarucas (representing the Tucumán Province). The side was created to represent the Argentine Littoral provinces in the northeast of Argentina. In November 2025, it was confirmed that former Cafeteros Pro and Dogos XV coach Nicolás Galatro would coach the franchise in 2026.

One of Union member is Unión de Rugby de Rosario which won the Campeonato Argentino 1 time in 1965.

== Stadium ==
The Capibaras XV play their matches at Jockey Club de Rosario, Rosario, Argentina.

== Current squad ==
The Capibaras XV squad for the 2026 Super Rugby Americas season is:

2026 Capibaras XV squad
**Props**: (Argentina) Pedro Annunziata; (Argentina) Enzo Avaca; (Argentina) Diego Correa; (Argentina) Lisandro Dipierri; (Argentina) Jorge Onorato; (Argentina) Ignacio Orsetti; (Argentina) Juan Ignacio Rodríguez; **Hookers**: (Argentina) Federico Cescut; (Argentina) Manuel Cúneo; (Argentina) Bernardo Lis; (Argentina) Martín Vaca; **Locks**: (Argentina) Bautista Benavides; (Argentina) Lucas Bur; (Argentina) Lorenzo Colidio; (Argentina) Ignacio Gallo; (Argentina) Juan Segundo Huber; (Argentina) Agustín Ponzio	**Back row**: (Argentina) Franco Benítez; (Argentina) Manuel Bernstein **(cc)**; (Argentina) Basilio Cañas; (Argentina) Ignacio Gandini **(cc)**; (Argentina) Jerónimo Gómez Vara; (Argentina) Bautista Greñón; (Argentina) Franco Marizza; (Argentina) Felipe Villgarán; **Scrum-halves**: (Argentina) Juan Lovell; (Argentina) Alejo Sugasti; (Argentina) Ignacio Zabella; **Fly-halves**: (Argentina) Martiniano Aime; (Argentina) Juan Baronio; (Argentina) Ignacio Dogliani; (Argentina) Santiago Vitola	**Centres**: (Argentina) Guido Chesini; (Argentina) Pietro Croce; (Argentina) Bautista Estellés; (Argentina) Bruno Heit; (Argentina) Tomás Malanos; (Argentina) Benjamín Ordiz; (Argentina) Mateo Tanoni; **Wings**: (Argentina) Mateo Baroli; (Argentina) Lautaro Cipriani; (Argentina) Gino Dicapua; (Argentina) Valentino González; (Argentina) Franco Rosetto; **Fullbacks**: (Argentina) **Emiliano Boffelli**; (Argentina) Francisco Lluch; (Argentina) Tomás Sigura
(cc) denotes co-captain. **Bold** denotes internationally capped players. * denotes players qualified to play for Argentina on residency or dual nationality. Source:
