= Avaca =

Avaca is a surname. Notable people with the surname include:

- Enzo Avaca (born 2000), Argentine rugby union player
- Giuliano Avaca (born 2003), Argentine rugby union player
