= Nicolás Bossicovich =

Argentine rugby union player

Nicolás Carlos Bossicovich (born 27 June 1969, in Rosario) is an Argentine former rugby union player and coach. He played as a lock. He is professionally an architect.

Bossicovich played all his career at Gimnastica y Esgrima Rosario. In 1997, he was suspended for 18 months after incidents in a game with Jockey Club de Rosario.

He had 2 caps for Argentina, in 1995, without scoring. He was called for the 1995 Rugby World Cup, but never played.

After finishing his player career, he became a coach. He was first in charge of GE Rosario, being assigned for the Unión de Rugby de Rosario, from 2003 to 2005. He resigned in 2005 for professional reasons.
