= Dean Anglesey =

Japan international rugby union player

- Full name: Walter Dean Anglesey
- Born: 9 December 1969 (age 56)
- Height: 6 ft 1 in (185 cm)
- Weight: 220 lb (100 kg)

Rugby union career
- Position: Flanker
Super Rugby
Years	Team	Apps	(Points)
1996–97	Chiefs	13	(10)
1998	Hurricanes	6	(0)
International career
Years	Team	Apps	(Points)
2002	Japan	3	(10)

Walter Dean Anglesey (born 9 December 1969) is a New Zealand former rugby union international for Japan.

Anglesey was raised in the small King Country town of Taumarunui and educated at Taumarunui High School.

A flanker, Anglesey played on the John Mitchell-captained New Zealand "Development Team" that toured Argentina in 1994 and represented King County in the National Provincial Championship 1st Division through much of the 1990s, later switching to Waikato. He had three seasons in the Super 12, with Chiefs in 1996 and 1997, then Hurricanes in 1998.

Anglesey left for Japan in 1999, to play with Kobe Steelers. He became qualified for Japan's national team during his time in Kobe and was capped for the country in three internationals in 2002, debuting against Tonga.

== See also ==
- List of Japan national rugby union players
