= Santa Fe Rugby Club =

Santa Fe
- Full name: Santa Fe Rugby Club
- Union: USR
- Founded: 20 December 1986; 38 years ago
- Location: Sauce Viejo
- President: Raúl De Biaggio
- Coach(es): Federico Caputo
- League(s): Torneo Apertura
- 2022: ?
Team kit

Santa Fe Rugby Club is an Argentine rugby union and field hockey club located in the city of Sauce Viejo in Santa Fe Province.

The rugby squad currently plays in Torneo del Litoral and won the title in 2008, the only club not from Rosario to do so.

== History ==
Santa Fe Rugby Club was founded on December 20, 1986, and shared Club La Salle Jobson's installations. Only after a year in existence, the club won the Unión Santafesina de Rugby title in 1987, the first of five USR titles.

Since 2000, SFRC has been taking part in the Torneo del Litoral, a tournament organised by the Rugby Unions of Santa Fe, Rosario and Entre Ríos. In 2008, the Club became the first club not from Rosario to win the Litoral title, beating Ateneo Inmaculada 21–13 in the final.

Since 1986, six Santa Fe players have gone on to play for Argentina A and/or the Argentine sevens team.

== Titles ==
- Torneo del Litoral (1): 2008
- Unión Santafesina de Rugby (5): 1987, 1988, 1989, 1990, 1991.
