= Club Universitario de Rosario =

Argentine sports club

Universitario (Rosario)
- Full name: Club Universitario de Rosario
- Founded: 20 September 1924; 101 years ago
- Location: Rosario, Santa Fe, Argentina
- League(s): Unión Rosarina (Rugby)
- Activities: List: Basketball; Basque pelota; Fencing; Field hockey; Futsal; Rugby union; Swimming; Water polo
- Colors: Electric Blue, Black
- Website: clubunirosario.com.ar

The Club Universitario de Rosario is an Argentine sports club based in the city of Rosario. Established in 1924, the club hosts a large variety of sports disciplines such as basketball, basque pelota, fencing, field hockey, futsal, rugby union, swimming and water polo.

The rugby team currently plays in tournaments organised by the Unión de Rugby de Rosario, the main body of the city. Universitario's arch-rival is neighbour club Gimnasia y Esgrima (also known for its acronym "GER").

== History ==
Rugby kit

Club Universitario was founded in 1924 as a sports club for the students of Rosario's four universities existing by then. The colors adopted were related to the representative color of each university, therefore they were red (Medical school), green (Engineering), blue (Law) and yellow (Economics), according to the act of foundation of the club. Nevertheless, sports teams of Universitario de Rosario have worn black and blue colors as their representative colors.

Universitario was one of the most participative sports club in Rosario, having been founding member of some of governing bodies in the city, such as Rugby, Basketball, Athletics and Field Hockey Associations, as well as the Santa Fe Province Fencing Federation.

Athletics would become the first sport practiced at the club, later followed by fencing, football, swimming, rugby union, basketball and field hockey.

== Titles ==
=== Rugby ===
- Torneo del Litoral (8): 1934, 1937, 1944, 1945, 1952, 1958, 2005, 2009
- Torneo Regional del Centro (2): 2007, 2008 (Note: Title shared with Tala after both teams tied 18–18 in the final, with no extra time played.)
