= Club de Rugby Ateneo Inmaculada =

Argentine rugby union and field hockey club

Ateneo Inmaculada (CRAI)
- Full name: Club de Rugby Ateneo Inmaculada
- Union: USR
- Founded: 22 October 1974; 51 years ago
- Location: Santa Fe, Argentina
- Ground: Autopista Santa Fe-Rosario km 150,5
- President: Alejandro Molinas
- Coach: Federico Fernández
- League: Torneo del Litoral
- 2022: ?
Team kit

Official website
- clubcrai.com.ar

Club de Rugby Ateneo Inmaculada (CRAI) is an Argentine rugby union and field hockey club, located in Santo Tomé, Santa Fe Province. Ateneo Inmaculada is a member of the Unión Santafesina de Rugby and currently plays in the Torneo del Litoral.

One of Santa Fe's youngest clubs, Ateneo Inmaculada reached the final of the Torneo del Litoral in 2007. Club's main rival is Santa Fe Rugby Club.

== History ==
In 1973, conscripts of the Engineers Regiment of Santo Tomé were told by the military authorities they could no longer play rugby on the premises of the regiment for safety reasons. They met again a year later, in the Ateneo Inmaculada social club, and decided to found the Club de Rugby Ateneo Inmaculada on October 22, 1974.

The club was donated 1.5 hectares (3.7 acres) of land, located near the Buenos Aires-Santa Fe motorway, by a rich family close to the club and started building rugby pitches and a club house. Until this donation was effective, CRAI moved to different fields to play its home games: Club Excursionista, Regimiento 12 and El Quilla were some of them, so the club was nicknamed El Gitano (The Gypsy), because of the character of nomad that those people have.

In 1973, a group of girls started to practise field hockey at the club. Two years later the CRAI opened a section for this sport and the different categories are incorporated to the club.
