= Enzo Avaca =

Argentine rugby union player (born 2000)

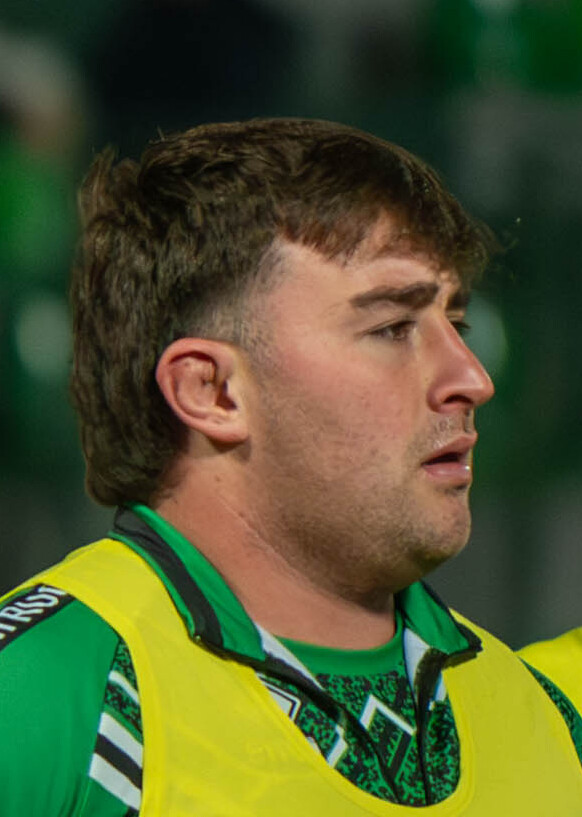
- Born: 12 June 2000 (age 26) Cordoba, Argentina
- Height: 1.88 m (6 ft 2 in)
- Weight: 118 kg (260 lb)

Rugby union career
- Position: Prop
- Current team: Capibaras XV
Youth career
- Tala
- 2019: Colorno
Senior career
Years	Team	Apps	(Points)
2019−2020	F.I.R. Academy	-	(-)
2020−2022	Tala	-	(-)
2022	Jaguares XV	0	(0)
2022–2023	Benetton	0	(0)
2022−2023	→Mogliano	9	(0)
2023–2025	Mogliano	12	(36)
2024–2025	→Benetton	8	(5)
2026–	Capibaras XV		
- Correct as of 25 Mar 2023
International career
Years	Team	Apps	(Points)
2019	Argentina U20		
- Correct as of 17 Oct 2022

Enzo Avaca (born 12 June 2000) is an Argentine rugby union player who plays for Mogliano in Serie A Elite.

Signed in August 2022 as Academy Player for Benetton in United Rugby Championship, from December 2022 he played for Mogliano in 2022−23 season on loan. After the loan to Mogliano in 2022−23, he was confirmed in its roster for next season.

Under contract with Mogliano, Avaca was named as Permit Player for Benetton in July 2024 ahead of the 2024–25 United Rugby Championship season. He made his debut in Round 3 of the 2024–25 season against the Leinster.

On 30 November 2023 he was called in Italy Under 23 squad for test series against IRFU Combined Academies.
