= Torneo del Litoral =

Argentine rugby union competition

Torneo Regional del Litoral – Primera
- Current season, competition or edition: 2021
- Sport: Rugby union
- Founded: 1929; 97 years ago
- No. of teams: 10
- Country: Argentina
- Confederation: URR
- Most recent champion: Jockey Club (R) (16th. title) (2025)
- Most titles: Atlético del Rosario; Duendes (27 titles each)
- Level on pyramid: 1
- Website: urr.org.ar/litoral

The Torneo Regional del Litoral – Primera División is an annual rugby union competition in Argentina. The tournament is contested by clubs from the Rosario, Santa Fe and Entre Ríos Unions, and is one of several regional competitions held in Argentina every year.

The tournament was first held in 1929, with Atlético del Rosario winning the first title. The Regional del Litoral runs from May to July.

Nowadays, the Top 10 is the main division of the Litoral Tournament, which is composed of three levels on pyramid, with the "Primera División" as the second level and "Segunda División" as the third division.

== Format ==
The competition is open to all clubs from the Rosario, Santa Fe, and Entre Ríos Unions, depending on their rankings the previous season. As founding member of the Buenos Aires Union (URBA), Rosario's oldest club (Atlético del Rosario) takes part in the Torneo de la URBA and does not participate in the Litoral tournament.

Ten teams participate in the first stage of the tournament (Top 10), with the eight best placed qualifying to play the "Zona Campeonato". and ten clubs playing the "Zona Reubicación", made up of the two teams worst placed in Top 10 plus other eight clubs.

The champion and runner-up of Torneo del Litoral qualify for the Nacional de Clubes, the main club competition of Argentina while the other best placed teams qualify for Torneo del Interior, the national club competition outside Buenos Aires.

== Clubs ==
Teams participating in Primera División (as of February 2023):

Club	City	Province
Ateneo Inmaculada	Santa Fe	Santa Fe
Duendes	Rosario	Santa Fe
Estudiantes	Paraná	Entre Ríos
Gimnasia y Esgrima	Rosario	Santa Fe
Jockey Club	Rosario	Santa Fe
Old Resian	Rosario	Santa Fe
Paraná Rowing Club	Paraná	Entre Ríos
Provincial	Rosario	Santa Fe
Santa Fe RC	Santa Fe	Santa Fe
Universitario	Rosario	Santa Fe

== List of champions ==
=== Results ===
Format

- 1929–1999: round-robin tournament format, with the team which earned most points being proclaimed champion.
- 2000–present: similar format but with a final match to define a champion.
- When more than a champion is indicated, the title was shared.

Ed.	Season	Champion
1	1929	Atlético del Rosario (1)
2	1930	Atlético del Rosario (2)
–	1931	(not held)
3	1932	Atlético del Rosario (3)
4	1933	Atlético del Rosario (4)
5	1934	Universitario (R) (1)
6	1935	Central Argentino (1)
7	1936	Atlético del Rosario (5)
8	1937	Universitario (R) (2)
9	1938	Huracán (1)
10	1939	Estudiantes (P) (1)
11	1940	Estudiantes (P) (2)
12	1941	Estudiantes (P) (3)
13	1942	Estudiantes (P) (4)
14	1943	Estudiantes (P) (5)
15	1944	Universitario (R) (3)
16	1945	Universitario (R) (4)
17	1946	Estudiantes (P) (6)
18	1947	Estudiantes (P) (7)
19	1948	Estudiantes (P) (8)
20	1949	Atlético del Rosario (6)
21	1950	Atlético del Rosario (7)
22	1951	Atlético del Rosario (8)
23	1952	Gimnasia y Esgrima (R) (1) (Note: Title shared.)
23	1952	Universitario (R) (5)
24	1953	Logaritmo (1)
25	1954	Logaritmo (2)
26	1955	Tacuara (1)
27	1956	Tacuara (2)
28	1957	Atlético del Rosario (9)
29	1958	Universitario (R) (6)
30	1959	Tacuara (3)
31	1960	Duendes (1)
32	1961	Atlético del Rosario (10)
33	1962	Atlético del Rosario (11)
33	1962	Duendes (2)
34	1963	Duendes (3)
35	1964	Duendes (4)
36	1965	Atlético del Rosario (12)
36	1965	Duendes (5)
37	1966	Duendes (6)
38	1967	Atlético del Rosario (13)
38	1967	Duendes (7)
39	1968	Duendes (8)
40	1969	Duendes (9)
41	1970	Atlético del Rosario (14)
41	1970	Duendes (10)
42	1971	Duendes (11)
43	1972	Los Caranchos (1)
44	1973	Atlético del Rosario (15)
45	1974	Atlético del Rosario (16)
46	1975	Atlético del Rosario (17)
47	1976	Atlético del Rosario (18)
48	1977	Atlético del Rosario (19)
49	1978	Atlético del Rosario (20)
50	1979	Atlético del Rosario (21)
51	1980	Atlético del Rosario (22)
52	1981	Atlético del Rosario (23)
53	1982	Atlético del Rosario (24)
54	1983	Atlético del Rosario (25)
55	1984	Atlético del Rosario (26)
56	1985	Atlético del Rosario (27) (Note: Atlético del Rosario quit the tournament in 1986 to focus on URBA competitions as a founding member.)
56	1985	Jockey Club (R) (1)
57	1986	Jockey Club (R) (2)
58	1987	Jockey Club (R) (3)
59	1988	Jockey Club (R) (4)
60	1989	Jockey Club (R) (5)
61	1990	Jockey Club (R) (6)
62	1991	Gimnasia y Esgrima (R) (2)
63	1992	Jockey Club (R) (7)
64	1993	Duendes (12)
65	1994	Jockey Club (R) (8)
66	1995	Jockey Club (R) (9)
66	1995	Duendes (13)
67	1996	Duendes (14)
68	1997	Jockey Club (R) (10)
69	1998	Jockey Club (R) (11)
70	1999	Jockey Club (R) (12)
71	2000	Duendes (15)
72	2001	Jockey Club (R) (13)
73	2002	Duendes (16)
74	2003	Gimnasia y Esgrima (R) (3)
75	2004	Gimnasia y Esgrima (R) (4)
76	2005	Universitario (R) (7)
77	2006	Duendes (17)
78	2007	Duendes (18)
79	2008	Santa Fe (1)
80	2009	Universitario (R) (8)
81	2010	Duendes (19)
82	2011	Duendes (20)
83	2012	Duendes (21)
84	2013	Duendes (22)
85	2014	Duendes (23)
86	2015	Duendes (24)
87	2016	Duendes (25)
88	2017	Jockey Club (R) (14)
89	2018	Duendes (26)
90	2019	Old Resian (1)
–	2020	(not held due to the COVID-19 pandemic)
91	2021	Duendes (27)
92	2022	Gimnasia y Esgrima (R) (5)
93	2023	Estudiantes (P) (9)
94	2024	Jockey Club (R) (15)
95	2025	Jockey Club (R) (16)

=== Titles by club ===
Team	Titles	Years won
Atlético del Rosario	27	1929, 1930, 1932, 1933, 1936, 1949, 1950, 1951, 1957, 1961, 1962, 1965, 1967, 1970, 1973, 1974, 1975, 1976, 1977, 1978, 1979, 1980, 1981, 1982, 1983, 1984, 1985
Duendes	27	1960, 1962, 1963, 1964, 1965, 1966, 1967, 1968, 1969, 1970, 1971, 1993, 1995, 1996, 2000, 2002, 2006, 2007, 2010, 2011, 2012, 2013, 2014, 2015, 2016, 2018, 2021
Jockey Club (R)	16	1985, 1986, 1987, 1988, 1989, 1990, 1992, 1994, 1995, 1997, 1998, 1999, 2001, 2017, 2024, 2025
Estudiantes (P)	9	1939, 1940, 1941, 1942, 1943, 1946, 1947, 1948, 2023
Universitario (R)	8	1934, 1937, 1944, 1945, 1952, 1958, 2005, 2009
Gimnasia y Esgrima (R)	5	1952, 1991, 2003, 2004, 2022
Tacuara	3	1955, 1956, 1959
Logaritmo	2	1953, 1954
Central Argentino	1	1935
Huracán	1	1938
Los Caranchos	1	1972
Santa Fe	1	2008
Old Resian	1	2019
