= Francisco Albarracín =

Argentine rugby union player (born 1985)

- Born: Francisco Albarracín; March 10, 1985 (age 41) La Plata, Argentina
- Height: 1.69 m (5 ft 6 1/2 in)
- Weight: 72 kg (11 st 5 lb)

Rugby union career
- Position: Scrum-half
Senior career
Years	Team	Apps	(Points)
2009 - 2010	Pampas	4	(5)
2010 -	La Plata	10	(10)
International career
Years	Team	Apps	(Points)
2008 -	Jaguars	5	
2007 -	Argentina	3	(5)
National sevens team
Years	Team		Comps
2007 -	Argentina		2

Francisco Albarracín (born March 10, 1985, in La Plata) is an Argentine rugby union player. He plays as a scrum-half.

He made his debut for Argentina against Chile in 2007. In May 2010, he was selected in a squad of over 40 players to represent Argentina in the two test Summer tour of Argentina.
