= Club Gimnasia y Esgrima de Rosario =

Argentine multi-sports club

Gimnasia y Esgrima (Rosario)
- Founded: 10 September 1904; 121 years ago
- Location: Rosario, Santa Fe, Argentina
- Affiliations: URR (Rugby)
- Chairman: Raúl Kaufman
- Colours: (Dark blue, Yellow)
- Website: clubger.com.ar

Club Gimnasia y Esgrima de Rosario (familiarly known for its acronym GER) is an Argentine multi-sports club from Rosario, Santa Fe. Water polo is the section that has won the most titles for the club, with 21 championships as of 2012.

The rugby union squad has also won several titles for the club, including two Torneo del Litoral and three Rosario RU championships.

Gimnasia y Esgrima de Rosario also offers sports facilities for aikido, artistic gymnastics, athletics, basketball, basque pelota, billiards, fencing, field hockey, football, artistic gymnastics, judo, swimming, synchronized swimming, table tennis, tennis and volleyball.

== History ==
In 1902, a club from Rosario, "Estudiantes Football Club", was interested in acquiring its own land for the practise of sports. Members of the club identified a field located in the public park Parque de la Independencia, but another club of the city (the "Club Atlético Argentino") was also interested in acquiring that land.

The then Governor of Rosario interceded in the dispute, giving the land to both clubs, on the condition that they merge into one. Therefore, on 10 September 1904 a new club was established, although keeping Club Atlético Argentino's name.

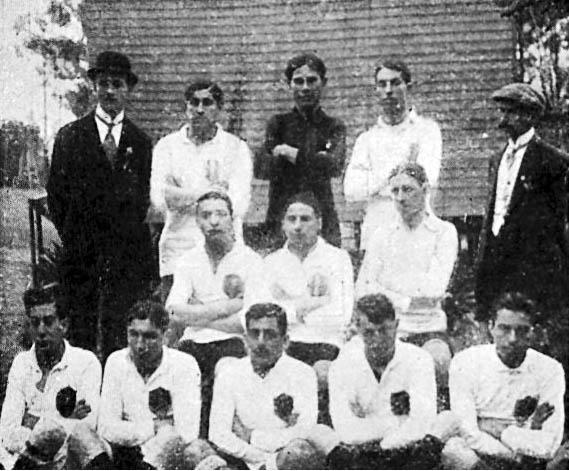
The Argentino de Rosario squad that played San Isidro in the 1911 Copa de Honor MCBA

Football was the first sport practised at the club, with Atlético Argentino being invited to join a new league established in 1905, that would be the first organised football body of Rosario. At the request of president of Newell's Old Boys, Víctor Heitz, other prominent teams of the city were invited to create a local league to organise its own competitions. Therefore "Liga Rosarina de Football" was established with Atlético Argentino as founding member along with Newell's, Rosario Central and Rosario A.C. The body organised a second division tournament that became the first competition in Santa Fe Province. The trophy awarded to winner team was donated by mayor of Rosario, Santiago Pinasco, and named after him.

The first tennis court was built in 1906. That same year the Lawn Tennis Club was established at GER. By 1918, the institution had eight courts, two of them with artificial lighting. Athletics consolidated as the second sport in importance of the club. One of the most predominant sportsmen of that era was Camilo Zanni, who represented Argentina in several international competitions. The race track was later named in his honour. The club hosted the first athletic championship of Rosario, currently "Torneo del Centenario".

On 9 August 1910 an assembly was held, changing the name to "Club Gimnasia y Esgrima de Rosario". The name "Gimnasia" ("Gymnastics" in Spanish) was due to athletics was not considered a sports by its own, including it as part of the gymnastics activities. Emilio Dotto was the general manager by then.

In 1920 the club affiliated to Federación Atlética Argentina (Argentine Athletics Federation) while the club built a new racetrack in the Parque Independencia. The track is opened in 1921 and organized a championship as part of the celebration.

Rugby union began in GER in 1927, with the first friendly matches played against porteño clubs Central Argentino, Gimnasia y Esgrima and Universitario. One year later, GER became founder member of Rosario Rugby Union. The first great achievement in rugby came in 1939 when the GER won its first championship.

Field hockey was introduced to GER in 1944, when a group of women and men that joined to play informal games at the club. The football section was organised in the mid 1980s.

== Facilities ==
Gimnasia y Esgrima hosts a wide range of sports in its three facilities, which are:

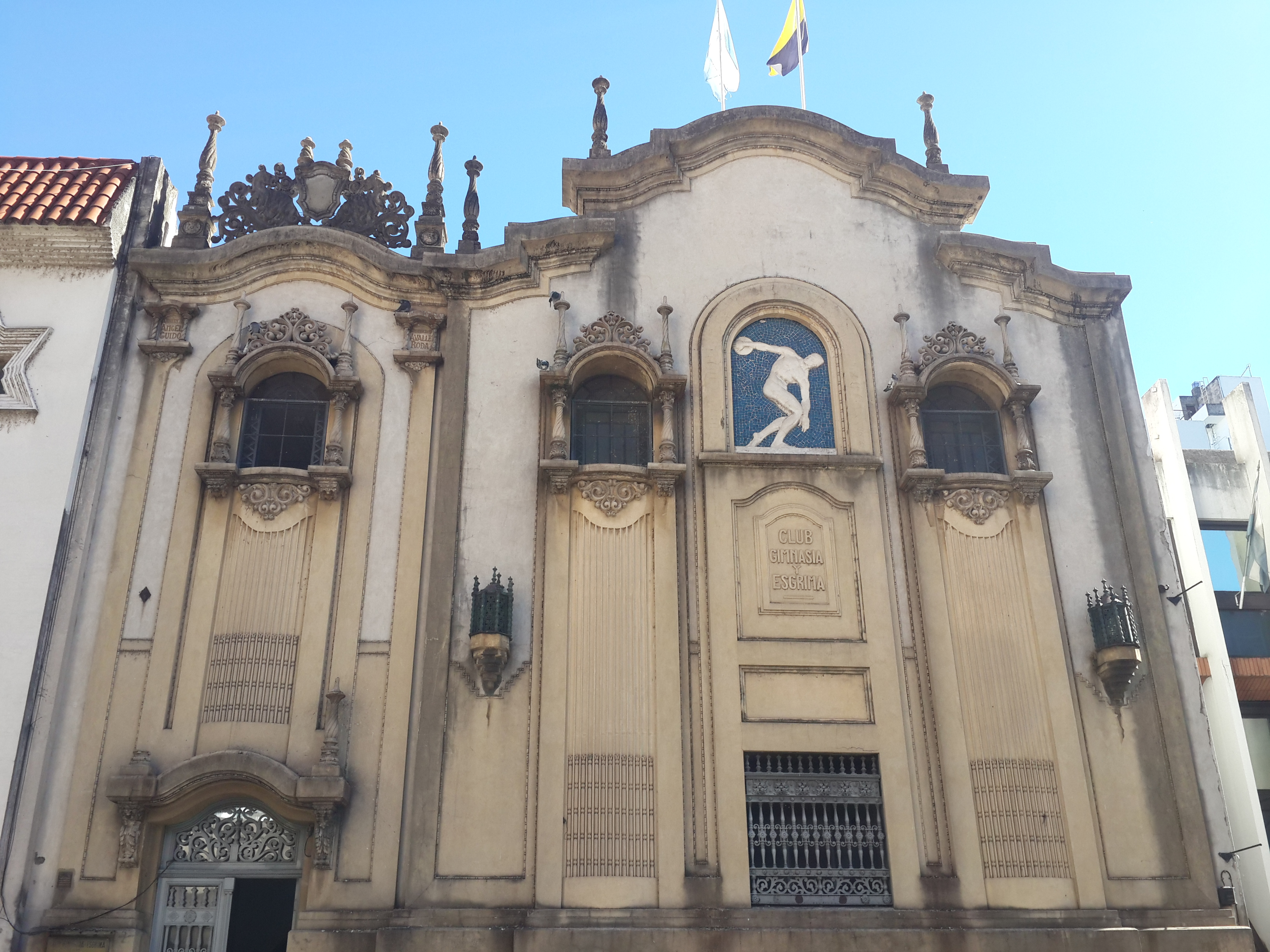
Headquarters building

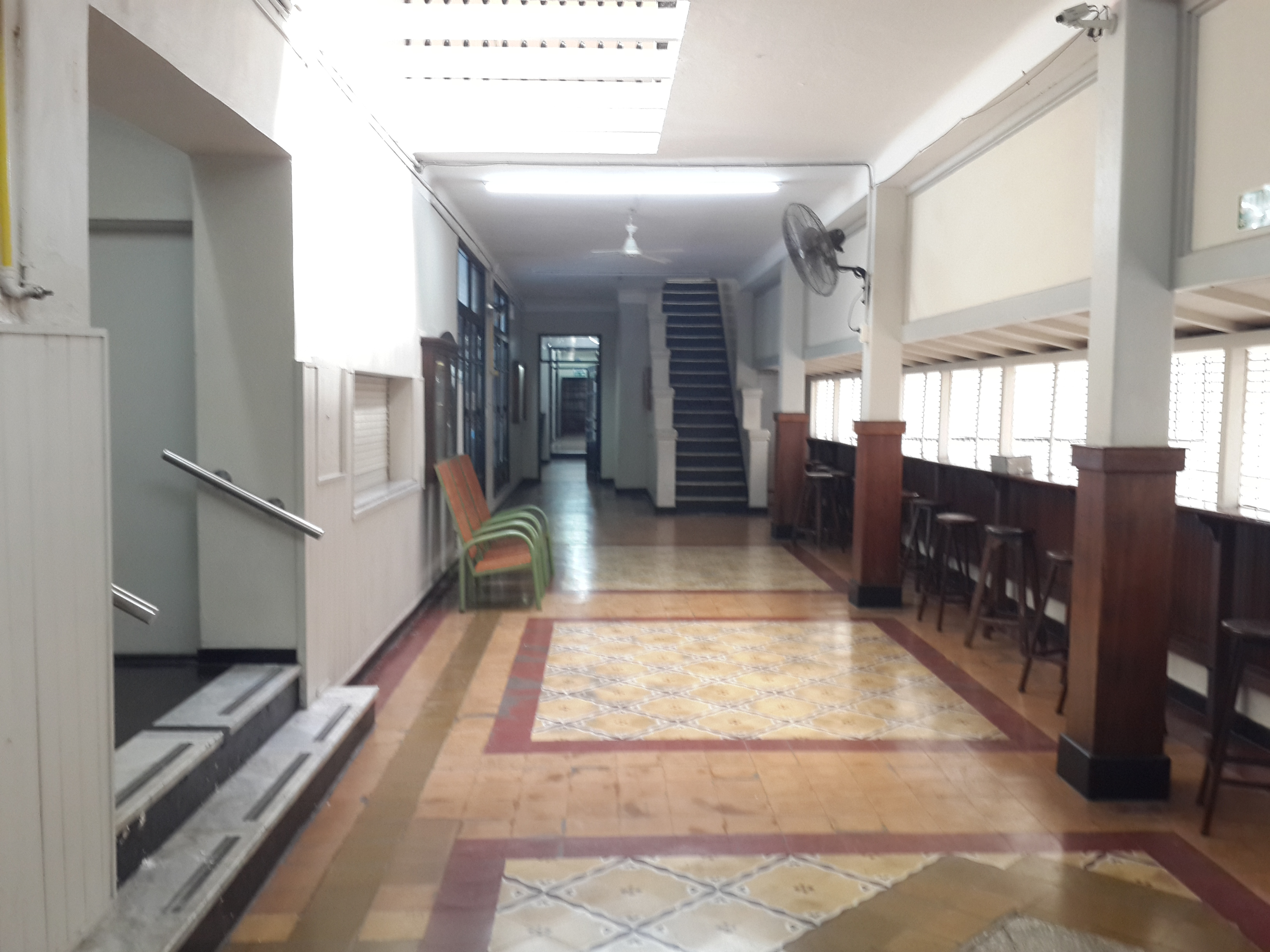
Clubhouse interior

- Central: Located in the centre of Rosario city, the headquarters are also there. That facility concentrates the major list of activities of the club, which includes artistic gymnastics, basketball, basque pelota, billiards, fencing, martial arts, swimming, synchronized swimming, table tennis, volleyball and water polo. The facility has also a roof stadium with more than 2,000 m2. Entertainment areas include a restaurant, a playroom for children, a reading room and an art gallery.
- Parque Independencia: Located in the homonymous public park of Rosario, it was the first facility of the institution when it was established in 1904. Athletics, field hockey, football, rugby and tennis are the sports practised there.
- Pueblo Esther: Based in the homonymous village, located 38 km from the city of Rosario. The facilities includes football, rugby union and hockey fields, paddle, tennis and volleyball courts, an athletics racetrack, a wall for basque pelota and a swimming pool. The amusement area includes a restaurant, a playroom, grills, parking and an exclusive woodland area for camping. The total surface of this facility is 257,000 m2.

== Sports ==
Gimnasia y Esgrima has several competitive teams that play in regional leagues of Rosario. Some of the most important are:

- Athletics: Along with football, athletics is one of the oldest activities of the club, being the second sport in importance when the club was established in 1904 as "Club Atlético Argentino". Camilo Zanni was not only one of the founders but a notable athlete, taking part in several international competitions representing Argentina. The race track was named in his honour. The club hosted the first athletic championship of Rosario, currently "Torneo del Centenario".
- Basketball: The team currently plays in the Primera División of Asociación Rosarina de Básquet (Rosario Basketball Association), having also competitive junior teams, having won several championships in diverse divisions.
- Field hockey: The women's field hockey team plays at the highest level of Argentine hockey, the Liga de Hockey Nacional 1st division.
- Football: It is practised only at children levels, competing in the EFA (Escuelas de Fútbol Asociadas) championships.

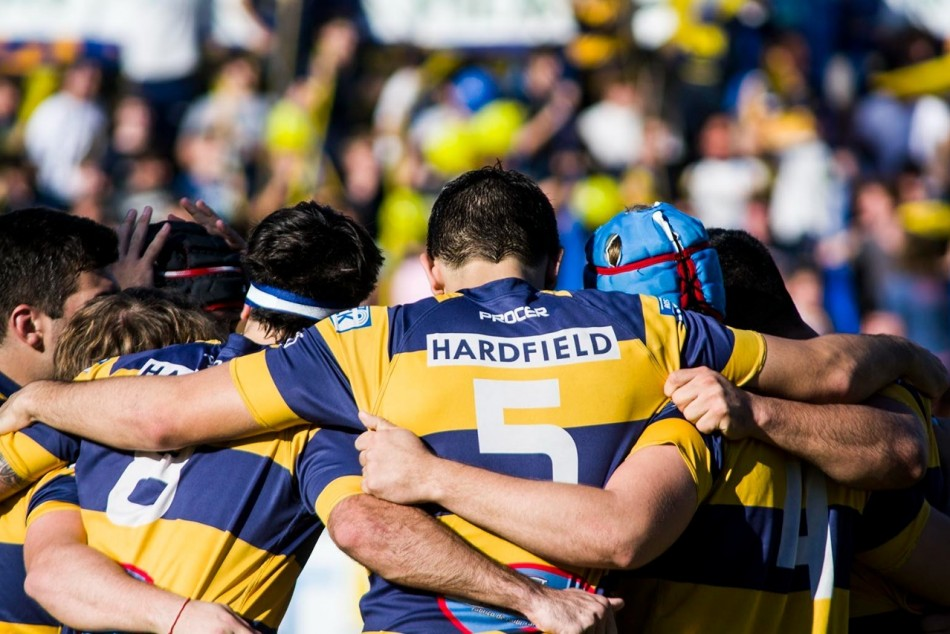
Rugby union players

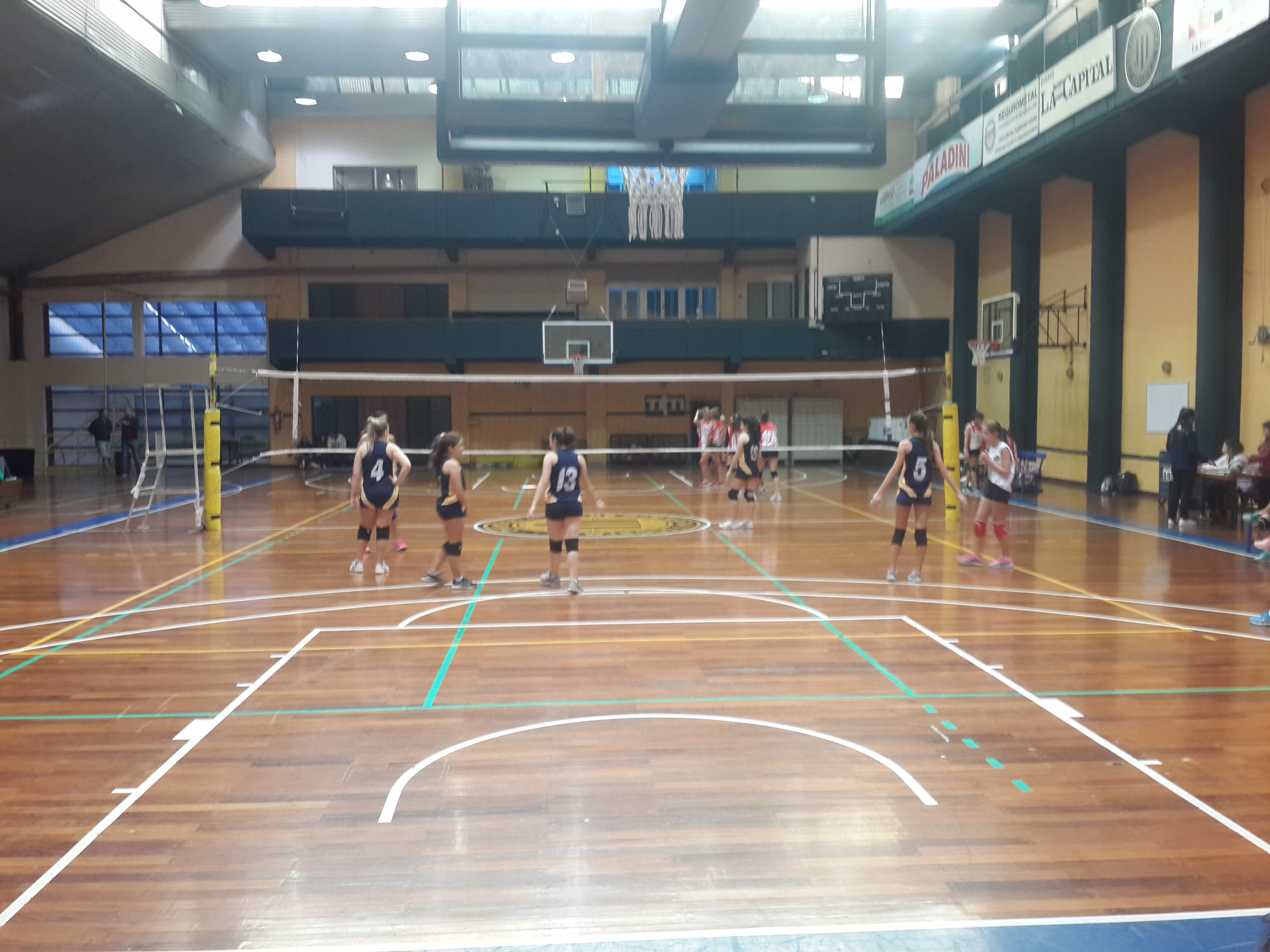
Volleyball court

- Rugby union: Gimnasia currently plays in the Unión de Rugby de Rosario league system also taking part in the Torneo del Litoral. Gimnasia y Esgrima has won the provincial title 5 times to date, being the last championship in 2004.
- Volleyball: Gimnasia y Esgrima has also achieved some success at regional level, winning the provincial title 9 times. Club's best finish at national level was 3rd in 2002.
- Water polo: One of the sports for which Gimnasia y Esgrima is mainly known and the most successful activity for the club. Gimnasia has won the Campeonato Argentino title 12 times within 13 years (8 of them consecutively), the Liga Argentina title 6 times (including five consecutive titles). The club also has three Súper 6 titles.

The first important achievement was in 1936, when the club won the Campeonato Rosarino de Cadetes (the intermediate division). In 1955 Gimnasia won the Provincial title. In 1967 Professor Pedro Giordano arrived to the club, incorporating new tactics that were considered revolutionary for water polo in Argentina. Some of the most notable players by then were Ricardo Morello, Carlos Vozzi, Enrique Piedfort and Héctor Aimetta. The club won several championships in senior, intermediate and junior divisions.

The water polo of Gimnasia y Esgrima has been widely praised by the media, with some players taking part of Argentina national team, such as Fernando Losada and Aimetta who played in the 1971 Pan American Games held in Cali. In successive years, Enrique Piedfort, Helio Orta, Héctor Barrios, were also notable players for the club.

From 1974 to 1974 Gimnasia achieved titles in all divisions. In 1976 the young team won the Argentine championship, with Marcelo Perazzo, Oscar Möller, Daniel Tapiz, Daniel Sevlever, Marcelo Mosquera, Horacio Toranzo, Eugenio Quattrocchio, Gustavo Grgicevic, Fabián Martín, Esteban Hernandez and Andrés Goldín as part of the team. Many of them were called for the national team that played the South American tournament in the Uruguayan city Punta del Este.

The first division team won another title, the Argentine championship of 1978. Despite all the titles won, in 1979 the club suppressed the practise of water polo, re-establishing it in 1982. In 1984 Fabián Martín y Marcelo Nicolich were called for Argentina to play the championship in Brazil.

== Titles ==
=== Rugby union ===
- Torneo del Interior (1): 2019
- Torneo del Litoral (5): 1952, 1991, 2003, 2004, 2022

=== Water polo ===
- Campeonato Argentino (12): 2001, 2002, 2003, 2004, 2005, 2006, 2007, 2008, 2010, 2011, 2012, 2013
- Liga Argentina (6): 2003, 2007, 2008, 2009, 2010, 2011
- Súper 6 (3): 2009, 2010, 2011
