= Duendes Rugby Club =

(Argentina) Duendes
- Full name: Duendes Rugby Club
- Union: URR
- Nickname: Verdinegro
- Founded: 5 January 1957; 69 years ago
- Location: Rosario, Argentina
- Ground: Las Delicias
- President: Pablo Cáceres
- League: Torneo del Litoral
- 2025: 4th.
Team kit

Duendes Rugby Club is an Argentine rugby union and field hockey club sited in Rosario, Santa Fe. The rugby team currently plays at Torneo del Litoral, the first division of the Unión de Rugby de Rosario (URR) league system.

== History ==
Duendes Rugby Club was founded in 1957 and registered with the Rosario Union that same year. After just one season the club won the promotion to the top division of the URR league system and won its first title in 1960.

Along with Atlético del Rosario and Jockey Club, Duendes is one of the most successful clubs in its city of origin, having won the Unión de Rugby de Rosario championship 15 times. The club also won the Torneo del Litoral tournament 12 times.

At national level, Duendes is also the most winning team from Rosario, having won the Nacional de Clubes title twice, in 2004 and 2009. On four occasions (1968, 1969, 1972 and 1993) the team remained unbeaten all season.

In 2009 Duendes won the inaugural Torneo del Interior, the national competition for clubs not from Buenos Aires. As winners of this tournament, the team qualified directly to the semi-finals of the overhauled Nacional de Clubes.

In November 2011, Duendes won its first Nacional de Clubes championship, defeating La Tablada 26-23 in the final match. The MVP was the fly-half Mateo Escalante, the game's top scorer with 16 points converted with 100% accuracy.

== Titles ==
- Nacional de Clubes (3): 2004, 2009, 2011
- Torneo del Interior (3): 2003, 2009, 2022
- Torneo del Litoral (26): 1960, 1962, 1963, 1964, 1965, 1966, 1967, 1968, 1969, 1970, 1971, 1993, 1995, 1996, 2000, 2002, 2006, 2007, 2010, 2011, 2012, 2013, 2014, 2015, 2016, 2018
