= Estudiantes de Paraná =

Argentine sports club from Paraná

Estudiantes (Paraná)
- Full name: Club Atlético Estudiantes
- Founded: 5 May 1905; 120 years ago
- Location: Paraná, Entre Ríos, Argentina
- Affiliations: Unión Entrerriana (Rugby)
- Activities: List: Athletics; Basketball; Basque pelota; Field hockey; Golf; Gymnastics; Polo; Rugby union; Softball; Scuba diving; Squash; Swimming; Tennis; Volleyball
- Chairman: Emilio Fouces
- Colors: Black, White
- Website: caeparana.com.ar

Club Atlético Estudiantes is an amateur Argentine sports club from Paraná, Entre Ríos. The club hosts a wide range of sports disciplines such as athletics, basketball, basque pelota, field hockey, golf, polo, rugby union, softball, scuba diving, squash, swimming, tennis, gymnastics and volleyball.

The rugby team currently competes in the Torneo del Litoral tournament, being one of the few clubs from Entre Ríos that take part in the competition.

== History ==
"Estudiantes Football Club" was founded on 5 May 1905, by football enthusiasts of the city of Paraná, Entre Ríos Province. By 1921 the club had acquired land in the city's Parque Urquiza and began building football pitches, as well as tennis courts there.

Rugby kit

Following a controversial city hall decision, the club briefly lost hold of their installations but re-acquired them in 1929. From then on the club would start to develop teams in many sports, adding tennis and athletics to their already existing football teams, thus becoming a multi-sports club.

After football became professional in 1931, the club decided to abandon the practise of the sport to keep its amateur principles active, therefore Estudiantes encouraged the addition of other activities such as rugby union and basketball. The club also changed its name to "Club Atlético Estudiantes". Estudiantes also added swimming and waterpolo after the construction of a swimming pool in 1937.

In 1953 however, the club would go into administration and briefly disbanded, with only the rugby and basketball teams surviving. By 1955, CAE was reborn and all teams started practicing again.

Many new sports, such as volleyball or field hockey, would appear at the club in the following decades to expand the offer of activities for the members.

== Titles ==
=== Rugby union ===
- Torneo del Litoral (9): 1939, 1940, 1941, 1942, 1943, 1946, 1947, 1948, 2023

== Events ==
=== Rugby U20 World Cup ===
In 2010 the Estudiantes' stadium was one of the three venues of the World Rugby U-20 Championship. Some pool A and pool C matches and the playoffs were played at Estudiantes' Stadium.

Date	Round	Team 1	Score	Team 2
5 Jun	Pool A	Wales	22–13	Samoa
9 Jun	Pool A	Wales	31–3	Fiji
17 Jun	9th. place	Ireland	37–10	Samoa
17 Jun	9th. place	Scotland	28–8	Tonga
21 Jun	9th. place	Samoa	3–23	Tonga
21 Jun	9th. place	Ireland	53–23	Scotland

Preceded by various venues in Japan	World Rugby U-20; Venue; 2010	Succeeded by various venues in Italy
