= Unión Santafesina de Rugby =

Rugby union governing body in Argentina

Santa Fe Rugby Union
- Sport: Rugby union
- Jurisdiction: Santa Fe Province (Note: With the exception of Rosario, controlled by the Unión de Rugby de Rosario.)
- Abbreviation: USR
- Founded: 1955; 71 years ago
- Affiliation: UAR
- Headquarters: Santa Fe
- President: Esteban Fainberg
- Vice president: Federico Caputto
- Secretary: Jorge Santoja

Official website
- www.usr.org.ar
- (Argentina)

The Santa Fe Rugby Union (Spanish: Unión Santafesina de Rugby) is the governing body for rugby union in Santa Fe Province in Argentina. The union runs rugby competitions in the province of Santa Fe with the exception of Rosario clubs, who are part of the Unión de Rugby de Rosario.

USR is one of the Argentine Rugby Union's 25 regional governing bodies. The Unión Santafesina also runs the Santa Fe team that represented the province in the now defunct Campeonato Argentino.

The best placed teams of USR competitions qualify to play the Torneo del Litoral, along with clubs from the Rosario and Entre Ríos Unions. A Santa Fe championship also exists for the clubs at underage levels.

== History ==
In 1949 the Unión de Rugby del Río Paraná was founded. Its role was to represent and organise competitions for clubs from both Santa Fe and Entre Ríos provinces.

Due to different point of views the URRP was split in two soon after. Clubs from Entre Ríos would go on to form the Unión Entrerriana de Rugby and clubs from Santa Fe the "Unión Santafesina de Rugby".

== Clubs ==
As of September 2021, affiliated clubs that participate in competitions organised by the USR are:

| Club | City |
|---|---|
| C.A. Adelante | Reconquista |
| Atlético Brown | San Vicente |
| Alma Juniors | Esperanza |
| Ateneo Inmaculada | Santo Tomé |
| Calchaquí F.C. | Calchaquí |
| Ceres R.C. | Ceres |
| Coronda R.C. | Coronda |
| Círculo Rafaelino de Rugby (CRAR) | Rafaela |
| Cha Roga | Santa Fe |
| Guaycurúes | Sunchales |
| Jorge Newbery | Villa Gobernador Gálvez |
| La Salle Jobson | Santa Fe |
| Querandí | Santa Fe |
| San Carlos R.C. | San Carlos Centro |
| C.A. San Jorge | San Jorge |
| San Justo R.C. | San Justo |
| Santa Fe RC | Santa Fe |
| C.A. Tostado | Tostado |
| Unión | Sunchales |
| Unión | Santa Fe |
| Universitario | Santa Fe |

== See also ==
- Torneo del Litoral
- Unión de Rugby de Rosario
- Argentine Rugby Union
