= Jockey Club de Rosario =

- Full name: Jockey Club de Rosario
- Nickname: Verdiblanco
- Activities: List: Contract bridge; Equestrianism; Fencing; Field hockey; Football; Golf; Horse racing; Polo; Rugby union; Swimming; Tennis
- Founded: September 18, 1900; 125 years ago
- Location: Rosario, Argentina
- Colors: (Navy, White)
- Chairman: Charles Roberts
- Website: jockeyclubderosario.com.ar

Jockey Club de Rosario is an Argentine sports and social club from Rosario, Santa Fe.

One of the richest clubs in the country, Jockey Club possesses its own racetrack, hara, golf course, tennis courts and swimming pools.

Counting more than 1,500 members, JCR enter representative teams in football, rugby union, field hockey, tennis, swimming, golf, show jumping and polo competitions.

== History ==
Jockey Club de Rosario was founded on September 18, 1900, by horse racing enthusiasts from all over Santa Fe Province. The club soon gained a reputation due to its horse riding activities and its hippodrome has been hosted the "Gran Premio Jockey Club de Rosario", one of the most important horse races in Argentina.

Rugby kit

The club's first order of business was to find a location suitable for the building of racecourse. A plot of land from parque de la Independencia was donated by then governor Luis Lamas and work promptly began. On December 8, 1901, Hipódromo de Rosario was opened with an attendance of 3,000 people. Although the club still uses the racecourse today, its administration reverted to the Municipality of Rosario in 2006.

In 1905, the club's statute changed from a commercial entity to a social club. That same year Jockey Club merged with Asociación Fenix and became a sports club. The first disciplina practiced at the club, apart from horse racing, was fencing. Many other sports would soon follow.

In 1916, the Art Deco club's headquarters were inaugurated. Designed by architect E. Le Monnier, the building is regarded today as one of the finest examples of Art Deco in Argentina.

In 1922 the club acquired 110 hectares (around 270 acres) on Córdoba and Wilde streets and started building sports fields there. Nicknamed "Country", this is where Jockey Club's main sporting installations are located today, including 17 tennis courts, a golf course and half a dozen rugby and football pitches.

Thanks to its new location Jockey club experimented with new sports. Polo started at the club in 1938, golf in 1956 and show jumping a year later.

Jockey Club began playing rugby in 1953 and affiliated to the Unión de Rugby de Rosario that same year. The team currently plays in the Torneo del Litoral, having won that championship in 2001 and 2017.

== Sports ==
Although founded as an equestrian club, Jockey Club quickly would incorporate other sports activities, such as football, golf, swimming, polo, tennis and rugby union.

The rugby union team is one of the most successful clubs of the Argentine Litoral region, having won many Unión de Rugby de Rosario titles and one Nacional de Clubes title in 1997.

== Titles ==
=== Rugby union ===
- Nacional de Clubes (1): 1997
- Torneo del Interior (2): 2000, 2002
- Torneo del Litoral (16): 1985, 1986, 1987, 1988, 1989, 1990, 1992, 1994, 1995, 1997, 1998, 1999, 2001, 2017, 2024, 2025
