= Unión de Rugby de Rosario =

Rugby union body in Rosario, Santa Fe, Argentina

- Sport: Rugby union
- Jurisdiction: Rosario, Santa Fe
- Abbreviation: URR
- Founded: August 14, 1928; 97 years ago (as "Santa Fe Rugby Union")
- Affiliation: UAR
- Affiliation date: 1953
- Headquarters: Rosario
- President: Lucas Diez
- Secretary: Sergio Tizón

Official website
- urr.org.ar
- (Argentina)

The Rosario Rugby Union (Spanish: Unión de Rugby de Rosario) is the organisational body that controls the game of rugby union in Rosario, in the province of Santa Fe, Argentina. The rest of Santa Fe province teams are organised under the Unión Santafesina de Rugby.

Best placed teams of RRU qualify to play the Torneo del Litoral, along with clubs from Santa Fe and Entre Ríos unions.

== History ==
Although the first rugby game in Argentina took place on 28 June 1886, between Rosario A.C. (current "Atlético del Rosario") and Buenos Aires F.C. On 12 July a second game was played between both clubs, Buenos Aires FC being the winner. local newspaper La Capital (dated 19 October 1871) mentioned a match of "a strange game known in England as 'rugby football'".

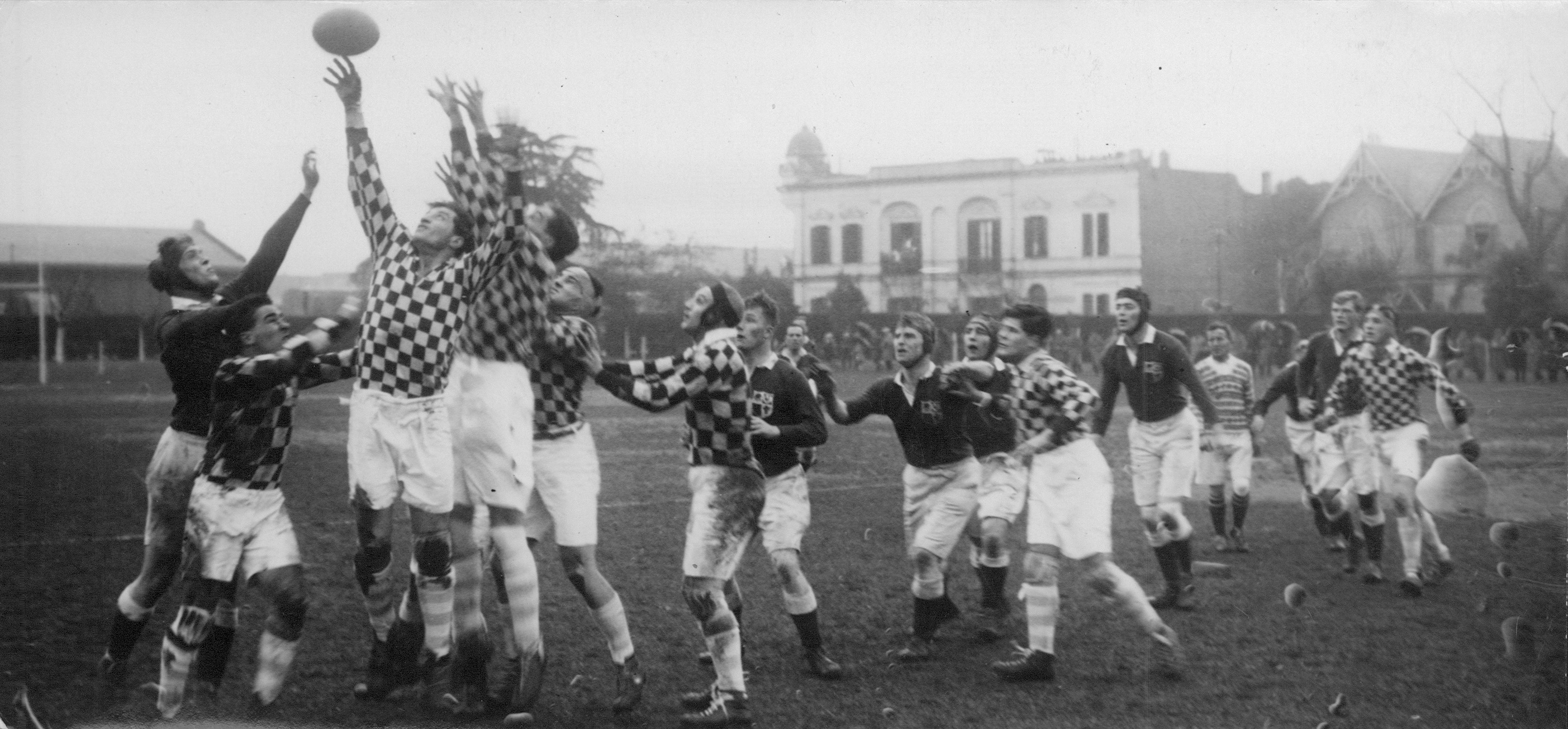
The British Isles team playing a Universitario–Gimnasia y Esgrima combined in Plaza Jewell, Rosario, on 3 August 1927

In 1927 the British Isles team arrived to Rosario to play a match against a combined team formed by players of porteños clubs Universitario and Gimnasia y Esgrima due to the impossibility of joining a competitive team with the small number of players in Rosario. Players of both teams arrived in Rosario after a long journey by train from Retiro to Rosario Norte station, the same day of the match. Held in Plaza Jewell, home venue of Club Atlético del Rosario, the Lions defeated the combined team by 24–0 in a rainy day. The game (won by the British) was the first international game played at the city of Rosario.

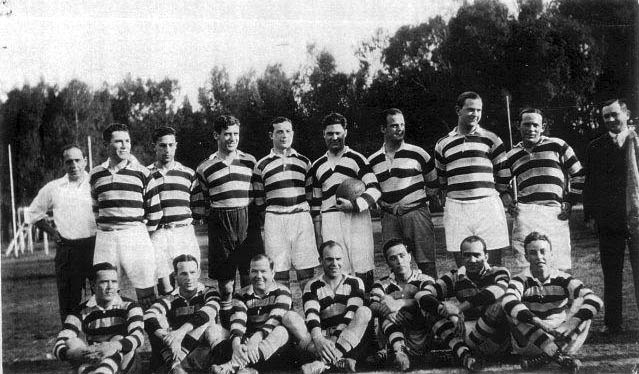
First team of the union, 1928

One year later, Atlético del Rosario, Universitario, Gimnasia y Esgrima, Provincial, Newell's Old Boys and defunct Deportivo Argentino founded the "Santa Fe Rugby Union", on 14 August 1928. That same year, the recently formed union played a game against a team from the River Plate Rugby Union (current Unión de Rugby de Buenos Aires), won by the visitor by 8–6.

In 1929 the official tournaments organised by the union began to be held. Atlético del Rosario won the two first editions but in 1931 the tournament was cancelled due to lack of teams. In 1932 the Union team played its first international match, facing the Junior Springboks during their first tour to South America. The Springboks defeated Santa Fe 53–3. That same year the Union changed its name to "Unión de Rugby del Litoral Argentino", adding teams from the cities of Santa Fe and Entre Ríos.

The URLA played with a Great Britain team for the first time in 1936 when the British combined toured on Argentina, being defeated 41–0.

The coming of the World War II caused international visits to be ceased until 1948, when a team formed by Oxford and Cambridge Universities. Estudiantes de Paraná was the most notable team in those times, winning most of the championships during the 1940s (1939–43, 1946–48). In 1953 the union changed to its current name, "Unión de Rugby del Rosario". The representative side played the Oxford-Cambridge combined during their second visit in 1956 and the Junior Springboks when the Boks toured on the country in 1959 (an 81–0 loss at Plaza Jewell).

In 1965 the Union achieved its greatest goal when winning the Campeonato Argentino. By those years, the URR also played the Oxford-Cambridge Combined (1965), the South African Gazelles (u23) (1966), and Scotland (1969). The URR team achieved their first international success in the 1970s, after beating Oxford-Cambridge (8–6) and Romania (7–6) in 1971. The team was also finalist during several editions of Campeonato Argentino, but could not win the title.

The Rosario union team toured outside Argentina for the first time in 1993, visiting England. Two years later, the team played some friendly matches in New Zealand.

Since 1993, the Unión de Rugby de Rosario teams have taken part in the Nacional de Clubes tournament. They also were added to Torneo del Interior in 1998, and they were added to Torneo del Litoral (along with Santa Fe and Entre Ríos unions teams) in 2000.

== Union team ==
URR team kit

The union was represented in the Campeonato Argentino, a competition in which each of the 24 unions that make up the Unión Argentina de Rugby (UAR) participated. Rosario won the competition on one occasion in 1965, winning 8–6 v Buenos Aires, and have finished second a further 16 times, all but 4 finals were lost to Buenos Aires.

=== Titles ===
- Campeonato Argentino (1): 1965

== Members ==
As of 2018 there are 15 affiliated member clubs, including Atlético del Rosario, although it competes in the Buenos Aires Rugby Union championships as a founding member of the Argentine Rugby Union established in 1899.

The URR has clubs from different cities of Santa Fe, Córdoba and even Buenos Aires provinces, they are:

Club	City
Atlético del Rosario (Note: As founding member of the Argentine Rugby Union in 1899, the club takes part of competitions organised by Unión de Rugby de Buenos Aires (URBA).)	Rosario
Belgrano	San Nicolás (Note: City in Buenos Aires Province)
Los Caranchos	Rosario
Duendes	Rosario
Gimnasia y Esgrima	Rosario
Jockey Club	Rosario
Jockey Club	Venado Tuerto
Logaritmo	Ibarlucea
Los Pampas	Rufino
Los Pingüinos	Pergamino
Old Resian	Rosario
Provincial	Rosario
Regatas	San Nicolás
Universitario	Rosario
Atlético Municipal	Marcos Juárez (Note: City in Córdoba Province.)

== Competitions ==
URR clubs (with the exception of Atlético del Rosario) compete in the annual Torneo del Litoral, an interprovincial competition that also includes teams from the neighboring unions of Santa Fe and Entre Ríos. The Litoral competition has been dominated by Rosario clubs over the years with all but one titles going to Rosarino clubs.

In the past, clubs from Rosario used to take part in a Rosario provincial championship. Since 2000 however, the inter-provincial Litoral competition has taken over and the provincial tournament is no longer played at the superior level. Provincial competitions still exist for clubs at underage level however.

Clubs from Rosario have also enjoyed some success in the national club tournament. Jockey Club (1997) and Duendes (2004, 2009) have won the competition, and both have reached the final in other tournaments.
