= 1961 Campeonato Argentino de Rugby =

Argentinian rugby union event

17° Campeonato Argentino
- Countries: Argentina
- Champions: Mar del Plata (1st title)

The 1961 Campeonato Argentino de Rugby was won by Mar del Plata who defeated Rosario in the final. There were several changes in this tournament:

- The selection of Provincia and Capital merged in the selection of Buenos Aires
- The teams were divided in four zones with a round-robin pool.
- For the first time success went to a team outside the direct control of the U.A.R.
- For the second time a foreigner was called to referee some matches of the championship: James Taylor of Scotland, who was also invited for a one-month educational visit for Argentine referees.

== Rugby Union in Argentina in 1961 ==
- Argentina won the third edition of South American Rugby Championship.
- The Buenos Aires Championship was won by C.A.S.I.
- The Cordoba Province Championship was won by Universitario and La Tablada.
- The North-East Championship was won by Nat. y Gimnasia and Tucumán RC.

== Preliminaries ==
ZONE A
20 July	Rosario	-	Santa Fe	17 - 12	Rosario
18 August	Buenos Aires	-	Rosario	3 - 11	Buenos Aires
11 September	Buenos Aires	-	Santa Fe	3 - 0	(withdraw)

- Ranking: 1. Rosario, 2. Buenos Aires, 3. Santa Fe

ZONE B
17 July	Rio Negro y Neuquén	-	Mar del Plata	6 - 22
17 August	Rio Negro y Neuquén	-	Sur	0 - 14
18 July	Mar del Plata	-	Sur	22 - 6	Mar del Plata

- Ranking: 1. Mar del Plata, 2. Sur, 3. Rio Negro y Neuquén

ZONE C
18 July	Córdoba	-	Valle de Lerma	33 - 6	Córdoba
28 July	Córdoba	-	UR del Norte	0 - 3	Córdoba
28 July	Valle de Lerma	-	UR del Norte	0 - 11	Salta

- Ranking: 1. Norte, 2. Valle del Lerma 3. Cordoba

ZONE D
11 September	San Juan	-	Cuyo	9 - 6	San Juan

(Rio Cuarto withdrew)

== Final Phase ==
=== Semifinals ===
24 September 1961

Mar del Plata	14-11	San Juan

Parque Calmet, Mar del Plata
Referee: Carlos Seminario (Argentina)

24 September 1961

Rosario	9-3	UR del Norte

Plaza Jewell, Rosario
Referee: Alberto Camardón (Argentina)

=== Final ===
30 September 1961

Mar del Plata	16-6	Rosario
Try: Ferrari, Prieto, Larosa, Con: Boublath, Tiribelli, Pen: Boublath		Pen: Caballero, Drop: Orengo

C.A.S.I., Buenos Aires
Referee: Eduardo Niño (Argentina)

Mar del Plata: Sastre O., Beverino G., Prieto L., Mollo A., Marenco C., Tiribelli H., Meyer R., Larosa R., Ferrari E., Ferrari L., Olivera C., Boublath R., Arroyo O., Esnaola M. (cap.), Vial S.
Rosario:: Caballero J., Mauro R., Puccio A., Dimaje J., Abalos R., Orengo J., Conti R., Villar W., Cerfoglio R. (cap.), Paillole C., Paquez E., Ferraro M., Esmendi R., Carosini A., Gómez Kenney J.

== Notes ==
- Rugby Archive

== Bibliography ==
- (in Spanish) Memorias de la UAR 1961
- (in Spanish) XVII Campeonato Argentino
