= 1984 Campeonato Argentino de Rugby =

40° Campeonato Argentino de Mayores
- Countries: Argentina
- Number of teams: 17
- Champions: Buenos Aires (21st title)
- Runners-up: Entre Rios

The Campeonato Argentino de Rugby 1984 was won by the selection of Buenos Aires that beat in the final the selection of the Entre Rios

== Rugby Union in Argentina in 1984 ==
=== National ===
- The Buenos Aires Championship was won by San Isidro Club
- The Cordoba Province Championship was won by Tala
- The North-East Championship was won by Los Tarcos
- The selection of Buenos Aires won also the "Campeonado de Menores" (Under21 Championship)

=== International ===
- In 1984 the selection of South American Jaguars made the last tour in South Africa

== First Phase ==
=== Zone A ===
1st round
15 September	Rosario	-	Santa Fe	28 - 18	Rosario
15 September	Buenos Aires	-	Noreste	92 - 3	Rosario

Finale 1. posto
16 September	Rosario	-	Buenos Aires	12 - 28	Rosario

=== Zone B ===
1st round
15 September	Chubut	-	Alto Valle	28 - 20	Trelew
15 September	Cuyo	-	Sur	18 - 13	Trelew

Finale 1. posto
16 September	Cuyo	-	Chubut	52 - 3	Trelew

=== Zone C ===
1st round
15 September	Salta	-	Jujuy	59 - 0	Salta
15 September	Tucumán	-	Santiago del estero	64 - 13	Salta

Finale 1. posto
16 September	Salta	-	Tucumán	25 - 30	Salta

=== Zone D ===
1st round
15 September	Misiones	-	San Juan	7 - 27	Misiones
15 September	Mar del Plata	-	Córdoba	19 - 12	Misiones

Finale 1. posto
16 September	Mar del Plata	-	San Juan	13 - 10	Misiones

=== Interzone ===
Interzone
22 September	Cuyo	-	Buenos Aires	9 - 51	Mendoza

== Semifinals ==
29 September 1984

Buenos Aires	21-13	Tucumàn

C. A. Estudiantes, Paranà
Referee: Sr. Alberto Freire (Mendoza)

29 September 1984

Entre Rios	22-19	Mar del Plata

C. A. Estudiantes, Paranà
Referee: José Maria Cabanas (B.Aires)

== Third place final ==
30 September 1984

Tucumàn	21-20	Mar del Plata

C. A. Estudiantes, Paranà
Referee: José Maria Cabanas (B.Aires)

== Final ==
30 September 1984

Buenos Aires	74-7	Entre Rios
Try: Visca 2, Petersen 2, Campo, Prat Gay, Cuesta Silva, Turnes, Leiva, Courreges, Javier Miguens, Porta, Pen: Porta 10; Drop: Porta		Try: Lescano; Pen: Albornoz

C. A. Estudiantes, Paranà E.R.
Referee: Sr. Alberto Freire (Mendoza)

Buenos Aires: 15.Bernardo Miguens, 14.Jorge de Prat Gay, 13.Diego Cuesta Silva, 12.Fabian Turnes, 11.Marcelo Campo, 10.Hugo Porta, 9.Javier Miguens, 8.Ernesto Ure, 7.José Visca, 6.Tomas Petersen, 5. Gonzalo Gasso (Carlos Durlach), 4. E. Leiva, 3.Diego Casch, 2. Andrés Courreges, 1.Luis E. Lonardi.
Entre Rios: 15.Castello, 14.M. Lescano, 13.Campos, 12.Albornoz, 11.Annichini, 10.Comaleras, 9.Faggi, 8.Ricciardi, 7. Federik, 6. C. Lescano, 5. Dall'Ava, 4.Budni, 3.Seri (Di Prettoro), 2.Cura (Bravo), 1. Borches.

== External links — bibliography ==
- (in Spanish) Memorias de la UAR 1984
- (in Italian) Francesco Volpe, Paolo Pacitti (Author), Rugby 2000, GTE Gruppo Editorale (1999)
