= 1947 Campeonato Argentino de Rugby =

3° Campeonato Argentino
- Countries: Argentina
- Number of teams: 8
- Champions: Provincia (3rd title)

The 1947 Campeonato Argentino de Rugby was won by the selection of Buenos Aires Province ("Provincia") that beat in the final 18-4 the selection of Capital.

== Rugby Union in Argentina in 1947 ==
- The "Championship of Buenos Aires" was won by Club Universitario de Buenos Aires
- The "Cordoba Province Championship" was won by Jockey Club Córdoba
- The North-East Championship was won by Club Natación y Gimnasia

== Results ==
QUARTERS OF FINALS
7 sept.	Montevideo Cricket Club	-	Capital	3 - 25	Montevideo
7 sept.	Litoral	-	Provincia	3 - 50	Rosario
7 sept.	Cuyo	-	Estudiantes Paranà	6 - 59	Mendoza
7 sept.	Córdoba	-	UR del Norte	11 - 3	Córdoba

SEMIFINALS
14 sept.	Capital	-	Córdoba	24 - 3	Maldonado, Buenos Aires
14 sept.	Provincia	-	Estudiantes Paranà	17 - 3	Maldonado, Buenos Aires

=== Final ===
29 September 1947

Provincia	18-4	Capital

Maldonado, Buenos Aires
Referee: Tomás H. Blades.

Provincia R. J. Frigerio (Pucará), J. Santiago (Hindú), R. del Molino Torres cap. (C.A.S.I.), P. Bereciartúa (Pucará), L. Caffarone (Olivos), R. Giles (Pucará), G. Ehrman (Pucará), J. Lockwood (Old Georgian), R. Aldao (C.A.S.I.), B. Grigolón (Hindú), A. González Bonorino (Olivos), J. S. Morganti (S.I.C.), A. Guyot (C.A.S.I.), C. Swain (Old Georgian), F. Petersen (Curupaytí)
Capital :D.A. Forrester (Belgrano), P. Torres García (Obras S.), R. D. H. Brown cap. (Belgrano), J. Sansot (C.U.B.A., A. Fernández Moores (C.U.B.A., R. Ross (Belgrano), E. Holmberg (C.U.B.A., J. O'Farrell (C.U.B.A., R. MacKay (GEBA), S. Racimo (GEBA), H. Crippa (Obras S.), L. Maurette (C.U.B.A., F. Elizalde (C.U.B.A., H. Achával (C.U.B.A., R. Lucotti (Belgrano).

== Bibliography ==
- (in Spanish) Memorias de la UAR 1947
- (in Spanish) III Campeonato Argentino
