= 1993 South Africa rugby union tour of Argentina =

- Date: Oct–Nov 1993
- Coach: Ian McIntosh
- Tour captain: Wahl Bartmann
Summary
P	W	D	L
Total
6	5	0	1
Test match
2	2	0	0
Opponent
P	W	D	L
Argentina
2	2	0	0

The 1993 South Africa rugby union tour of Argentina was a series of matches played in October and November 1993 in Argentina by the South Africa national rugby union team.

In the same period, also a development South African team, toured Argentina, Chile and Uruguay.

== Results ==
(test match)

#	Date	Rival	Res.	Score	Venue	City
1	28 Oct	Córdoba	W	55–37	Estadio Córdoba	Córdoba
2	30 Oct	Buenos Aires	L	27–28	Estadio Ferro	Buenos Aires
3	2 Nov	Tucumán	W	40–12	Estadio Atl. Tucumán	S.M. Tucumán
4	6 Nov	Argentina	W	29–26	Estadio Ferro	Buenos Aires
5	9 Nov	Rosario	W	40–26	Estadio Newell's	Rosario
6	13 Nov	Argentina	W	52–23	Estadio Ferro	Buenos Aires

== Match details ==
28 October

Córdoba	37–55	South Africa
Try: Tomalino 2, Irazoqui, Sagrera; Con: Luna 4 Pen: Luna		Try: Strauss 3, Dirks, Kruger, Le Roux, Oliv1er, Williams; Con: Honiball 6 Pen: Honiball

Estadio Córdoba, Córdoba
Referee: G. Bavio (URBA)

Team details

Córdoba: J. Luna; F. Pereyra, I. Merlo, G. Sagrera, G. Tomalino; H.Herrera, C.Barrea; S.Irazoqui, D.Rotondo, M.Viola; J.Simes, D.Pereyra (c); D, Muñoz, I.Ferreyra, A.Rodríguez Araya
South Africa: C.Dirks; J.Oliv1er, H.Fuls, H.Le Roux, C.Williams; H.Honiball, H.Martens; R.Kruger, T. Strauss (c), M.Andrews; N.Wegner, S.Atherton; G.Kebble, N.Drotske, K.Andrews

30 October

Buenos Aires	28–27	South Africa
Try: Villalonga; Con: Arbizu; Pen: Arbizu 7		Try: Cliv1er 2, MUller, Joubert; Con: Stransky 2 Pen: Stransky

Ferro Carril Oeste, Buenos Aires
Referee: Paul Bleckwedel (URT)

Team details

Buenos Aires
South Africa

Buenos Aires: Diego Cuesta Silva (S.I.C.); Horacio Rivarola (Belgrano A.C.), Marcelo Loffreda (S.I.C.), Sebastián Salvat (Alumni), Gustavo Jorge (Pucará); Lisandro Arbizu (Belgrano A.C.), Nicolás Fernández Miranda (Hindú), Rodolfo Villalonga (Alumni), Guillermo Ugartemendía (Los Matreros), Rolando Martín (S.I.C.); Germán Llaness (La Plata), Pedro Sporleder (Curupayti); Diego Cash (S.I.C.) (c), Juan J. Angelillo (S.I.C.) Matías Corral (S.I.C.)
South Africa: A.Joubert; J.Small, P.Müller, H.Le Roux, J.Oliv1er; J.Stransky, J. Van Der Westhuizen; M.Andrews, G.Teichman, W.Bartman (c); G.Wegner, J.Strydom; I.Swart, J.Allan, A. Le Roux

2 Nov

Tucumán	12-40	South Africa
Pen: Mesón 4		Try: Dirks, Martens, Williams, Strauss; Con: Honiball 4 Pen: Honiball

Atlético Tucumán, S.M. Tucumán
Referee: E. Sklar (URBA)

Team details

Tucumán
South Africa

Tucumán: S.Mesón; M.Terán, P.Mesón, L.Herrera, M.Pfister; R.Sauze, E.García Hamilton; J.Santamarina (c), F. Buabse; P.Buabse (red card) , C.Gentile; L.Molina (red card) , R.Le Fort, A.Macome, J.Coria
South Africa: C.Dirks; C.Williams, H.Fuls, P.Müller, J.Small; H, Honiball, H.Martens; T.Strauss (c), W.Bartmann, R.Kruger; J.Strydom (red card) , S.Atherton; K.Andrews (red card) ; A.Drotske, G.Kebble

6 Nov

Argentina	26–29	South Africa
Try: Cuesta Silva, Mesón; Con: Mesón 2 Pen: Mesón 4		Try: Small 2, Van Der Westhuizen, Joubert; Con: Stransky 3 Pen: Stransky

Ferro Carril Oeste, Buenos Aires
Referee: Dereck Bevan (Wales)

Team details

Argentina
South Africa

Argentina: Santiago Mesón (Tucumán); Martín Terán (Tucumán), Diego Cuesta Silva (S.I.C.), Sebastián Salvat (Alumni), Gustavo Jorge (Pucará); Lisandro Arbizu (Belgrano A.C.), Gonzalo Camardón (Alumni); Raúl Pérez (Rosario), Guillermo Ugartemendía (Los Matreros), Pablo Fernández Bravo (Tucumán); Germán Llanes (La Plata R.C.), Pedro Sporleder (Curupaytí); Patricio Noriega (Hindú), Ricardo Le Fort (Tucumán), Matías Corral (S.I.C.)
South Africa: A.Joubert; J.Small, H.Fuls, P.Müller, J.Oliv1er; J.Stransky, J. Van Der Westhuizen; R. Kruger, T.Strauss, F.Piennard (Capitán); S.Atherton, J.Strydom; J.Swart, J.Allan, G. Kebble

9 Nov

Rosario	40–26	South Africa
Try: Oviedo, F.del Castillo; Con: Crexell 2 Pen: Crexell 4		Try: Johnstone, Kruger, Fuls, H.Le Roux, Teichman; Con: Stransky 3 Pen: Stransky 3

Newell's Old Boys, Rosario
Referee: José Luis Rolandi

Team details

Rosario: Bouza; G.Romero Acuña; Molina, F.del Castillo, L.Caffaro Rossi; G.del Castillo, R.Crexell (c); L.Oviedo, P.Baraldi, Carmona; Bosicovich, R.Pérez; Céspedes, Silvetti, Promancio
South Africa: G.Johnstone; C.Williams, P.Müller, H.Le Roux, J.Oliv1er; J.Stransky, H.Martens; R.Kruger, G.Teichmann, W.Bartmann (c); G.Wegner, M.Andrews; K.Andrews, A.Drokste, H. Le Roux

13 Nov

Argentina	23–52	South Africa
Try: Camardón, Jorge; Con: Mesón 2 Pen: Mesón 2 Drop: Arbizu		Try: Small 2, Van Der Westhuizen, Williams, Strauss 2, Johnstone; Con: Johnstone 4 Pen: Johnstone 3

Ferro Carril Oeste, Buenos Aires
Referee: Dereck Bevan (Wales)

Team details

Argentina: Santiago Mesón (Tucumán); Martín Terán (Tucumán), Diego Cuesta Silva (S.I.C.), Sebastián Salvat (Alumni), Gustavo Jorge (Pucará); Lisandro Arbizu (Belgrano A.C.), Gonzalo Camardón (Alumni); Miguel Bertranou (Cuyo), Guillermo Ugartemendía (Los Matreros), Pablo Fernández Bravo (Tucumán); Germán Llanes (La Plata R.C.), Pedro Sporleder (Curupaytí); Patricio Noriega (Hindú), Ricardo Le Fort (Tucumán), Matías Corral (S.I.C.)

South Africa: G.Johnstone; J.Small, P.Müller, H.Fuls, C.Williams, H.Honiball, J. Van Der Westhuizen; R.Kruger, T.Strauss, F.Pienaar (c); S. Atherton, J. Strydom; K.Andrews, A.Drotske, G.Kebble

== The tour of "development" team ==
#	Date	Rival	Res.	Score	Venue	City
1	20 Oct	Mar del Plata	W	32–29	Estadio Club Universitario	Mar del Plata
2	24 Oct	Chile	W	68–19	Estadio Univ. Católica	Santiago
3	26 Oct	San Juan	W	18–11	Estadio Hilario Sánchez	San Juan
4	31 Oct	Argentina	L	10–42	Estadio Gimnasia y Esgrima	La Plata
5	3 Nov	Santa Fe	L	19–21	Estadio C.A. Colón	Santa Fe
6	6 Nov	Uruguay	L	22–37	Estadio Parque Central	Montevideo
