= Torneo Pampeano =

- Organising body: Mar del Plata R.U. Sur R.U.
- Founded: 2009; 16 years ago
- Region: South of Buenos Aires Province
- Number of teams: 10
- Related competitions: Torneo del Noroeste
- Current champions: Mar del Plata RC (2022)
- Most successful club(s): Mar del Plata RC (7 titles)

The Torneo Pampeano is a regional rugby union competition in Argentina.

The competition started in 2009 and involves clubs from the unions of Mar del Plata and Sur.

This annual tournament has traditionally been dominated by Mar del Plata clubs. As in other inter-provincial tournaments, such as the Torneo del Litoral or Torneo del Noroeste, the best clubs from the Torneo Pampeano qualify for the national level Torneo del Interior.

== Championships ==
The Torneo Pampeano includes 10 teams competing for the provincial title. All the champions are listed below:

=== Titles ===
Ed.	Year	Champion(s)	Score	Runner-up
1	2008	IPR Sporting (Note: "IPR" the initials for "Instituto Peralta Ramos" so it is the rugby team of the homonymous Marist School in Mar del Plata.) (1)	– (Note: Round-robin tournament format.)	Los Cardos
2	2009	IPR Sporting (2)	–	San Ignacio
3	2010	IPR Sporting (3)	17–16	Los Cardos
4	2011	IPR Sporting (4)	19–13	
5	2012	IPR Sporting (5)	6–6 (Note: It is unclear how it was defined to proclaim a champion.)	Sociedad Sportiva
6	2013	Mar del Plata RC (1)	–	IPR Sporting
7	2014	Mar del Plata RC (2)	–	IPR Sporting
8	2015	Mar del Plata RC (3)	–	IPR Sporting
9	2016	Mar del Plata RC (4)	–	IPR Sporting
10	2017	IPR Sporting (6)	–	Mar del Plata RC
11	2018	Mar del Plata RC (5)	–	IPR Sporting
12	2019	Sociedad Sportiva (Note: Club from Bahía Blanca. Not to be confused with Sociedad Sportiva Argentina.)	14–11	Mar del Plata RC
–	2020	(not held due to COVID-19 pandemic in Argentina)		
13	2021	Mar del Plata RC (6)	21–11	IPR Sporting
14	2022	Mar del Plata RC (7)	32–22	IPR Sporting

=== Titles by club ===
Team	Titles	Years won
Mar del Plata RC	7	2013, 2014, 2015, 2016, 2018, 2021, 2022
IPR Sporting	6	2008, 2009, 2010, 2011, 2012, 2017
Sociedad Sportiva	1	2019
