= Torneo del Interior =

Argentine rugby union tournament

Torneo del Interior A
- Current season, competition or edition: 2025
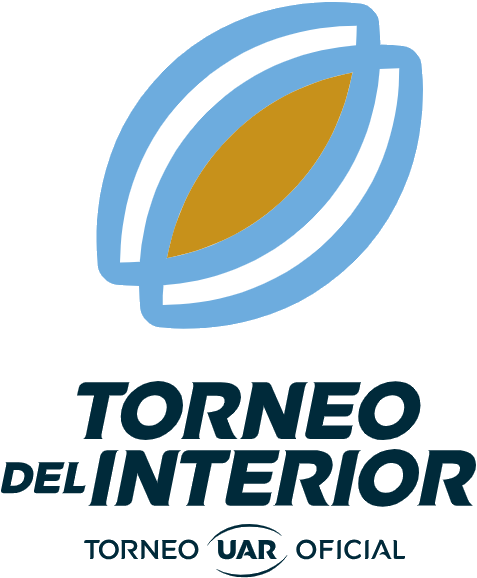
- Sport: Rugby union
- Founded: 1998; 28 years ago
- No. of teams: 16
- Country: Argentina
- Confederation: UAR
- Most recent champion: Marista (1st title) (2025)
- Most titles: Duendes (5 titles)
- Broadcaster: ESPN
- Level on pyramid: 1
- Related competitions: URBA Top 12; Nacional de Clubes
- Website: uar.com.ar/torneodelinterior

The Torneo del Interior A is an annual rugby union competition in Argentina. The competition involves clubs from all provincial unions outside Buenos Aires. Teams qualify from different tournaments along the provinces of Argentina, such as Litoral, Noroeste, Córdoba, Nordeste, Pampeano, Oeste and Patagónico.

There are also two lower divisions of Torneo del Interior, "Interior B" and "Interior C", with a similar format.

== Overview ==
The original tournament was held from 1998 to 2004, being re-launched in 2009, in an effort to bring provincial clubs to the same level as the teams from Buenos Aires.

Buenos Aires clubs do not participate in this competition so they take part in the Top 12 organised by the URBA. From 2013 on, the top nine teams from the Torneo del Interior qualify for the Nacional de Clubes, where they compete with the top seven teams from the Torneo de la URBA.

== Format ==
The "Torneo del Interior A" is contested by 16 clubs from the best placed teams of predetermined seven regional tournaments. Teams are divided into four zones, playing each other in a double round-robin tournament. Teams with the most points in each zone advance to quarter finals, concluding with semi-finals and a final.

In 2018, Uruguayan club Montevideo Cricket took part of the tournament by invitation.

== Champions ==
Below is the list of finals contested from 1998 to date:

=== Finals ===
- Note: Host cities are decided by lottery between both finalists.

Ed.	Season	Champion	Score	Runner-up	Venue	City	Ref.
1	1998	Jockey Club (C) (1)	25–13	Marista	La Tablada	Córdoba	
2	1999	Jockey Club (C) (2)	26–13	Duendes	Jockey Club	Rosario	
3	2000	Jockey Club (R) (1)	26–22	Tala	Estadio Mario Kempes (Note: Not the main venue but the auxiliary field.)	Córdoba	
4	2001	La Tablada (1)	21–16	Cardenales	Natación y Gimnasia	Tucumán	
5	2002	Jockey Club (R) (2)	32–28	Universitario (T)	Jockey Club	Rosario	
6	2003	Duendes (1)	22–20	Cardenales	Duendes RC	Rosario	
7	2004	Tala (1)	35–26	Los Tarcos	Tala RC	Córdoba	
–	2005–2008	(Not held)					
8	2009	Duendes (2)	35–21	Universitario (T)	Duendes RC	Rosario	
9	2010	La Tablada (2)	25–18	Cardenales	Cardenales RC	Tucumán	
10	2011	La Tablada (3)	37–27	Duendes	Duendes RC	Rosario	
11	2012	Duendes (3)	40–21	Cardenales	Tala RC	Tucumán	
12	2013	Duendes (4)	36–6	Tala	Duendes RC	Rosario	
13	2014	Urú Curé (1)	25–11	Los Tordos	Urú Curé RC	Río Cuarto	
14	2015	Cardenales (1)	26–16	Los Tordos	Cardenales RC	Tucumán	
15	2016	Los Tarcos (1)	25–20	Jockey Club (R)	Los Tarcos RC	Tucumán	
16	2017	La Tablada (4)	25–22	Gimnasia y Esgrima (R)	Club La Tablada	Córdoba	
17	2018	CURNE (Note: Acronym for "Club Universitario de Rugby del Nordeste", based in Chaco Province.)(1)	20–14	Huirapuca	Club CURNE	Resistencia	
18	2019	Gimnasia y Esgrima (R) (1)	30–20	Marista	Club GER	Rosario	
–	2020–21	(Not held due to COVID-19 pandemic)					
19	2022	Duendes (5)	38–12	Huirapuca	Duendes RC	Rosario	
20	2023	Universitario (T) (1)	25-21	Córdoba AC	Universitario RC	Tucumán	
21	2024	Tucumán Lawn Tennis (1)	30–24	Jockey Club (C)	Jockey Club	Córdoba	
22	2025	Marista (1)	27–7	Jockey Club (C)	Marista RC	Luján de Cuyo	

=== Titles by team ===
Team	Titles	Years won
Duendes	5	2003, 2009, 2012, 2013, 2022
La Tablada	4	2001, 2010, 2011, 2017
Jockey Club Córdoba	2	1998, 1999
Jockey Club Rosario	2	2000, 2002
Tala	1	2004
Urú Curé	1	2014
Cardenales	1	2015
Los Tarcos	1	2016
CURNE	1	2018
Gimnasia y Esgrima (R)	1	2019
Universitario (T)	1	2023
Tucumán Lawn Tennis	1	2024
Marista	1	2025
