= Club Palermo Bajo =

Argentine sports club

(Argentina) Palermo Bajo
- Full name: Club Palermo Bajo
- Union: Unión Cordobesa de Rugby
- Nickname: Bajo
- Founded: 15 May 1955; 70 years ago
- Location: Córdoba, Argentina
- Ground: Barrio Los Boulevares
- President: Mario Aldao
- Coach: Claudio Ruíz
- League: Top 10 Córdoba
- 2025: ?
Team kit

Official website
- clubpalermobajo.com.ar

Club Palermo Bajo is an Argentine sports club based in the city of Córdoba, which is also the capital of Córdoba Province. The institution is mostly known for its rugby union team, which currently plays in Top 10, the first division of the Unión Cordobesa de Rugby league system.

In field hockey, the club is affiliated to amateur Córdoba Field Hockey Federation, where its teams compete.

Other sports that can be practised at the club are swimming and tennis.

== History ==
=== Beginning ===
The club was founded on May 15, 1955, due to the initiative of a group of men who wanted to encourage their children to practise football by playing matches against other teams from the region. Its first name was "Bajo Palermo Baby Fútbol Club"; Bruno Montesco was the first president of the recently created institution.

Bajo Palermo initially focused on children's football, building a specific purpose field but also building a bowls green, an athletics track (nevertheless this sport would disappear in subsequent years), a motocross track (which hosted a wide variety of races that were a great success in the Province) and a basketball stadium. In 1969 the swimming pool was finished, as well as field hockey was introduced at the club, becoming one of the main sports practised at the institution. That same year, the practise of rugby union is incorporated into the club.

=== Coming of rugby ===
The first match played by a rugby team was facing Club Atlético General Paz Juniors (or simply "Juniors") on May 25, 1959, in order to commemorate the 4th. anniversary of the institution. Bicycle races, basketball matches and children's games were also part of the celebration. The first rugby line-up was: Casteli, Gamboa, Mateo, Viale, Durante, C. Quiroga, Vicario, Lipari, Martínez H., Muñoz F., Ferrari J., Ferrari H., Hasspacher, Lorenzón, Avila (captain), Galíndez, Villalba, Muñoz M., Valenzuela, De Velva and Pedrerol. Palermo Bajo was defeated by 17–3.

In 1994 a youth team (under-21) of the institution toured abroad for the first time in the club's history, tripping to Australia. Two years later Palermo Bajo won the Torneo Preparación Oficial of Unión Cordobesa de Rugby, beating Córdoba Athletic by 25–22. The first team would make its international debut in 2000, touring Europe.

=== Championship ===
Palermo Bajo won its first Torneo de Córdoba title in 2002, defeating Jockey Club Córdoba 23–19 in the final game. Some players of that team were: Agustín Corchio, Paulo Cecchetto, Gastón Toranzo, F. Interdonato, Juan Covassi, Mariano Moya, Mauro Gallardo, Chevi Irazoqui, Esteban Brouwer de Koning, Marcos Ferreyra, Pablo Rusculleda, Ricardo Barbará, Rodrigo Altamira, Ezequiel Ferrini, Eugenio Morra, Nicolás Cativelli, Daniel Ferreyra and Tomás Brouwer de Koning, being coached by Marcelo Ambroggio and Alfredo Díaz.

The second-division team also won the 2002 and 2003 championships.

== Colors and badge ==
The first colors of the club (when it was still a children football institution) had been inspired on Buenos Aires' football club Vélez Sarsfield, the white and blue shirt. Likewise, the rugby jersey design was primarily taken from a picture of a French team of Perpignan. This jersey was worn for 32 years until it was replaced by its current design made by architects Tosi and Cano.

About the colors, maroon with thin gold stripes, some version state that they were inspired on oil company Shell's colors.

About the badge, the most accepted version about the origins of the emblem refers to a journalist called Vélez, who usually referred to the players as "los Bichos Colorados (the Red Bugs)". This nickname was used by artist Ramón Galíndez to draw the bug (in fact, a beetle) and the rest of club's badge. The beetle has remained as the characteristic symbol of the institution.

== Titles ==
- Torneo de Córdoba (1): 2002
