= Torneo Regional de Rugby del Nordeste =

Torneo de Rugby del Nordeste
- Organiser(s): Unión de Rugby del Nordeste
- Founded: 1999; 27 years ago
- Region: Northwest of Argentina (Chaco, Corrientes, Misiones y Formosa)
- Qualifier for: Torneo del Interior
- Related competitions: Torneo del Oeste; Torneo del Litoral
- Current champions: CURNE (2023)
- Most championships: CURNE (10 titles)

The Torneo de Rugby del Nordeste, commonly known as the Regional de Rugby del Nordeste Argentino, is a regional rugby union competition in Argentina. It is organised by the Unión de Rugby del Nordeste, a regional body founded in 1963 and headquartered in Resistencia, Chaco.

The competition started in 1999 and involves clubs from Chaco, Corrientes, Formosa, and Misiones provinces of Argentina.

As in other inter-provincial tournaments, such as the Torneo del Litoral or Torneo del Noroeste, the best placed clubs from the Torneo del Nordeste qualify for the national competition Torneo del Interior.

== Championships ==
The Torneo de Rugby del Nordeste includes 8 teams competing for the regional title. All the champions are listed below:

=== Titles ===
Ed.	Year	Champion	Score	Runner-up	Location city (stadium in brackets)
1	1999	Aranduroga (1)	– (Note: No final held, champion decided on points earned.)	Taraguy	
2	2000	Taraguy (1)	–	Aranduroga	
3	2001	Centro de Cazadores (1)	–	– (Note: No runner-up.)	–
4	2002	Taraguy (2)	–	Aranduroga	
5	2003	Taraguy (3)	–	Aranduroga	
6	2004	Taraguy (4)	–	Aranduroga	
7	2005	Taraguy (5)	–	Aranduroga	
8	2006	Taraguy (6)	–	Aranduroga	
9	2007	Taraguy (7)	–	CURNE	
10	2008	CURNE (Note: Acronym for "Club Universitario de Rugby del Nordeste".)(1)	18–14	Taraguy	Resistencia (CURNE)
11	2009	CURNE (2)	24–7	San Patricio	Corrientes (Taraguy)
12	2010	Regatas Resistencia (1)	11–9	CURNE	Resistencia (CURNE)
13	2011	Aranduroga (2)	30–27	Regatas Resistencia	Santa Ana (Aranduroga)
14	2012	CURNE (3)	26–25	San Patricio	Resistencia (CURNE)
15	2013	CURNE (4)	32–8	San Patricio	Resistencia (CURNE)
16	2014	CURNE (5)	31–27	San Patricio	Resistencia (CURNE)
17	2015	San Patricio (1)	20–18	CURNE	Santa Ana (Aranduroga)
18	2016	Taraguy (8)	27–22	CURNE	Santa Ana (Aranduroga)
19	2017	CURNE (6)	33–22	Taraguy	Santa Ana (Aranduroga)
20	2018	Taraguy (9)	17–12	CURNE	Resistencia (CURNE)
21	2019	CURNE (7)	24–15	Aguara	Santa Ana (Aranduroga)
–	2020	(not held; tournament cancelled due to the COVID-19 pandemic in Argentina)			
22	2021	CURNE (8)	– (Note: Championship not validated by Unión de Rugby del Nordeste (URNE).)		
23	2022	CURNE (9)	26–16	Aranduroga	Santa Ana (Aranduroga)
24	2023	CURNE (10)	20–6	Aranduroga	Corrientes (Taraguy)
25	2024	CURNE (11)	18–14	Taraguy	Santa Ana (Aranduroga)
26	2025	CURNE (12)	22–3	Taraguy	Santa Ana (Aranduroga)

=== Titles by club ===
Team	Titles	Years won
CURNE	12	2008, 2009, 2012, 2013, 2014, 2017, 2019, 2021, 2022, 2023, 2024, 2025
Taraguy	9	2000, 2002, 2003, 2004, 2005, 2006, 2007, 2016, 2018
Aranduroga	2	1999, 2011
Regatas Resistencia	1	2010
Cazadores Posadas	1	2001
San Patricio	1	2015
