= Miguel Ruiz (rugby union) =

Argentine rugby union player (born 1975)

- Born: Miguel Angel Ruiz; January 10, 1975 (age 51) Mendoza, Argentina
- Height: 6 ft 4 in (1.93 m)
- Weight: 238 lb (108 kg)

Rugby union career
- Position: Lock
Amateur team(s)
Years	Team	Apps	(Points)
199?	Tauranga		
Senior career
Years	Team	Apps	(Points)
1992-1999	Teque Rugby Club		
1999	Parma		
1999-2004	Teque		
2004-2005	Bourgoin-Jallieu		
2005-2008	Teque		
International career
Years	Team	Apps	(Points)
1997-2002	Argentina	25	(10)

Miguel Angel Ruiz (born 10 January 1975 in Mendoza) is an Argentine rugby union footballer. He plays as a loose forward or lock. He works at an office.

Ruiz played at Teque Rugby Club when he was selected for the Argentina squad that entered the 1999 Rugby World Cup finals. He played in three matches back then.

Ruiz had 25 caps for the "Pumas", from 1997 to 2002, scoring 2 tries, 10 points in aggregate.
