= Torneo Patagónico =

- Organising body: Alto Valle; Austral; Valle de Chubut; Lagos del Sur
- Founded: 2008; 17 years ago
- Number of teams: 6
- Related competitions: Torneo del Noroeste
- Current champions: Bigornia (2023)
- Most successful club(s): Neuquén RC (7 titles)

The Torneo Patagónico, commonly known as the Torneo Regional Patagónico de Rugby, is a regional rugby union competition in Argentina.

The competition started in 2008 and involves clubs from the unions of Alto Valle, Austral, Valle del Chubut, and Lagos del Sur.

This annual tournament has traditionally been dominated by clubs from Neuquén Province. As in other inter-provincial tournaments, such as the Torneo del Litoral or Torneo del Noroeste, the best clubs from the Torneo Patagónico qualify for the national level Torneo del Interior B.

== Unions and regions ==
Union	Estab.	Provinces	Headquarters
Alto Valle	1959	Neuquén, Río Negro	Neuquén
Austral	1965	Chubut, Santa Cruz	Comodoro Rivadavia
Valle de Chubut	1971	Chubut	Trelew
Lagos del Sur	2001	Chubut, Neuquén, Río Negro	Bariloche

== List of champions ==
Ed.	Year	Champion(s)	Score	Runner-up
1	2008	Neuquén RC (1)	21–14	Marabunta
2	2009	Marabunta (1)	– (Note: Round-robin tournament format.)	Neuquén RC
3	2010	Neuquén RC (2)	–	Marabunta
4	2011	Neuquén RC (3)	–	Bigornia
5	2012	Neuquén RC (4)	–	Marabunta
6	2013	Neuquén RC (5)	–	Marabunta
7	2014	Neuquén RC (6)	25–23	Marabunta
8	2015	Neuquén RC (7)	32–9	Bigornia
9	2016	Bigornia (1)	21–18	Catriel
10	2017	Roca RC (1)	30–19	Bigornia
11	2018	Roca RC (2)	28–10	Jabalíes
12	2019	Roca RC (3)	17–15	Jabalíes
–	2020	(not held) (Note: Cancelled due to the COVID-19 pandemic in Argentina.)		
–	2021	(not held)		
13	2022	Dep. Portugués (1)	–	Jabalíes RC
14	2023	Bigornia (2)	–	Roca RC

== Titles by club ==
Team	Titles	Years won
Neuquén RC	7	2008, 2010, 2011, 2012, 2013, 2014, 2015
Roca RC	3	2017, 2018, 2019
Bigornia	2	2016, 2023
Marabunta	1	2009
Dep. Portugués	1	2022
