= 1992 France rugby union tour of Argentina =

Summary
| P | W | D | L |
Total
| 8 | 5 | 0 | 3 |
Test match
| 2 | 2 | 0 | 0 |
Opponent
| P | W | D | L |
Argentina
| 2 | 2 | 0 | 0 |

The 1992 France rugby union tour of Argentina was a series of match played by France rugby union team in June and July 1992, in Argentina.

France won both the official test match against the Pumas.

== Matches ==
Scores and results list France's points tally first.

| Rival | Result | Date | Venue | Status |
|---|---|---|---|---|
| Córdoba | 62–20 | 16 June | Club Universitario, Córdoba | Tour match |
| Buenos Aires | 18–12 | 20 June | Vélez Sarsfield, Buenos Aires | Tour match |
| Tucumán | 21–24 | 23 June | Atlético Tucumán, S.M. de Tucumán | Tour match |
| Invitación XV | 32–18 | 27 June | Aldo Cantoni, San Juan | Tour match |
| Cuyo | 30–32 | 30 June | Independiente Rivadavia, Mendoza | Tour match |
| Argentina | 27–12 | 4 July | Vélez Sarsfield, Buenos Aires | Test match |
| Rosario | 6–8 | 7 July | Newell's O.B., Rosario | Tour match |
| Argentina | 33–9 | 11 July | Vélez Sarsfield, Buenos Aires | Test match |
