= Cardenales Rugby Club =

Argentinian rugby union club, based in San Miguel de Tucumán

(Argentina) Cardenales
- Full name: Cardenales Rugby Club
- Union: URT
- Nickname(s): Purpurados, Nales
- Founded: 23 February 1944; 82 years ago
- Location: San Miguel de Tucumán, Argentina
- Ground: Silvano Bores
- President: Marcelo Vidal
- League: Torneo del Noroeste
- 2011: 4th
Team kit

Cardenales Rugby Club, or simply Cardenales, is a rugby union and field hockey club from San Miguel de Tucumán, Argentina. Founded in 1944 as a rugby club, Cardenales co-founded the Unión de Rugby de Tucumán.

One of the oldest rugby clubs in Tucumán, Cardenales won the Torneo del Noroeste 4 times.

== History ==
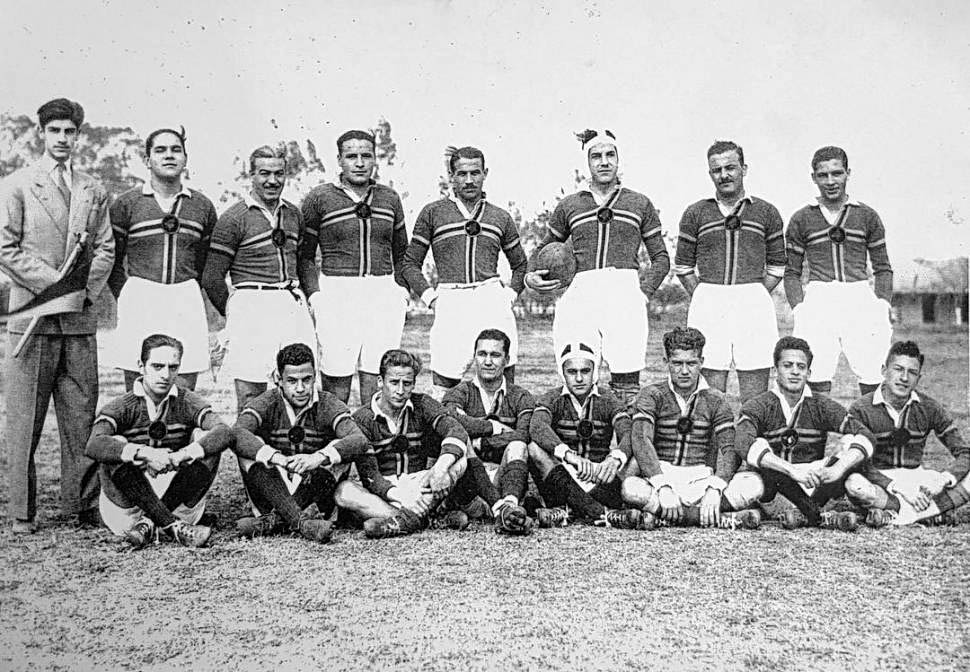
A Cardenales team in the 1940s

In 1944, rugby enthusiasts from San Miguel de Tucumán were planning on founding a provincial union in order to facilitate the practice of the sport in the region. However, at the time only 3 rugby clubs existed in the city: Tucumán Rugby Club, Universitario and Club Natación y Gimnasia; and the minimum number of clubs required to found a provincial union was four. With this in mind, students from all over the province met in Natación's club house and decided to found Cardenales Rugby Club.

Along with the other three clubs, Cardenales became a co-founder of the Unión de Rugby del Norte (today's Unión de Rugby de Tucumán) that same year. A field hockey section for women was started at the club in the 1980s.

== Titles ==
- Torneo del Noroeste (4): 1954, 1964, 2002, 2013
