= Huirapuca Social Club =

Argentinian rugby union club, based in Concepción, Tucumán

Huirapuca
- Full name: Club Huirapuca SC
- Union: URT
- Founded: 3 June 1953; 72 years ago
- Location: Concepción, Tucumán, Argentina
- Ground: Parque de la Joven Argentina
- President: Miguel López
- League: Torneo del Noroeste
- 2022: 1st (Champion)
Team kit

Club Huirapuca SC, is an Argentine sports club from Concepción, Tucumán. Founded in 1953, the club is mostly known for its rugby union team. Huirapuca is also the largest sports club in Tucumán Province, outside of the capital San Miguel de Tucumán.

== History ==
Huirapuca was founded in the small town of Concepción, Tucumán on June 3, 1953. Playing in the Parque de la Joven Argentina, at the north of the city, the club had to share its installations with the local aeroclub, and playing fields were often used as a landing strip.

Today the clubs owns more than 13 hectares of installations, making it the largest Tucumán club outside of the capital San Miguel. Today around twenty different disciplines are practiced at the club, most notably rugby union, basketball, softball and field hockey.

Huirapuca launched its rugby programme in 1975. From humble beginnings, the club has now become one of the most successful in the province, having won the Torneo del Noroeste 5 times.

== Titles ==
- Torneo del Noroeste (5): 1999, 2001, 2003, 2013, 2022
- Torneo del Interior (1): 2010
