= Marista Rugby Club =

Rugby union and field hockey club in Mendoza, Argentina

(Argentina) Marista
- Full name: Marista Rugby Club
- Union: URC
- Nickname: Curas
- Founded: 1961; 65 years ago
- Location: Luján de Cuyo, Mendoza Province, Argentina
- Ground(s): La Carrodilla, Mendoza
- President: Fernando Podestá
- League: Top 10
- 2025: 1st.
1st kit	2nd kit

Marista Rugby Club is an Argentine sports club based in Luján de Cuyo, a city in Mendoza Province. The rugby union team is member of the Unión de Rugby de Cuyo and currently plays in Torneo del Oeste, a regional league.

The club also has a field hockey section, which teams compete in tournaments organised by "Asociación Mendocina de Hockey sobre Césped" (Mendoza Field Hockey Association).

== History ==
Marista Rugby Club was founded in 1961 by Marist reverend Primo Brunato. Founded in Mendoza the club has since moved to La Carrodilla, Luján de Cuyo, just outside the city.

The club has strong links with fellow marist clubs: Club Champagnat and Club Manuel Belgrano in Buenos Aires, Club San Luis in La Plata and Mar del Plata's Sporting. Together, these clubs take part in the annual Copa Marista friendly tournament.

Although the club was only founded in 1961, Marista quickly became one of the most successful teams in Mendoza, reaching the top division in 1964 and winning the title two years later. Marista would then go on to dominate cuyano rugby, winning seven titles in succession, between 1966 and 1972.

Overall, the club has won 24 provincial titles and reached the final of the first ever Torneo del Interior in 1998, eventually losing to Jockey Club Córdoba. As of 2023, Marista has won six Torneo del Oeste championships, the last in 2021.

== Titles ==
- Torneo del Interior (1): 2025
- Regional de Cuyo – Top 10 (9): 2000, 2006, 2011, 2015, 2019, 2021, 2023, 2024, 2025
- Unión de Rugby de Cuyo (25): 1966, 1967, 1968, 1969, 1970, 1971, 1972, 1974, 1976, 1978, 1979, 1980, 1981, 1983, 1984, 1987, 1995, 1998, 1999, 2000, 2006, 2011, 2015, 2019, 2021
