= Club Natación y Gimnasia =

Argentine rugby union and field hockey club

(Argentina) Natación y Gimnasia
- Full name: Club Natación y Gimnasia
- Union: URT
- Nickname: Blancos
- Founded: 21 February 1930; 96 years ago
- Location: San Miguel de Tucumán, Argentina
- Ground: Gabriel Palou
- President: Juan Terraf
- League: Torneo del Noroeste
- 2025: 2nd.
Team kit

Club Natación y Gimnasia is a rugby union and field hockey club from San Miguel de Tucumán, Argentina. Founded in 1930 as a multi-sports club, Natación y Gimnasia is registered with the Unión de Rugby de Tucumán. Despite its name, swimming and gymnastics are no longer practiced at the club.

Natación y Gimnasia is one of the most successful rugby clubs in Tucumán, having won the Torneo del Noroeste 8 times to date.

== History ==
The institution was founded in San Miguel de Tucumán on 21 February 1930, as a multi-sports club. A large variety of activities were practiced at the club, including equestrianism, fencing, athletics, tennis and of course swimming and gymnastics. The rugby union section, for which the club is most famous today, started in 1941.

By the 1940s the club had become one of the best multi-sports club in the country. Following a controversial political decision, the club was absorbed by the Universidad Nacional de Tucumán in 1945. The club would try and fight the decision, to no avail.

Members of the rugby section, unhappy with the decision, decided not to join UNT and created a new club, using the old Natación y Gimnasia name.

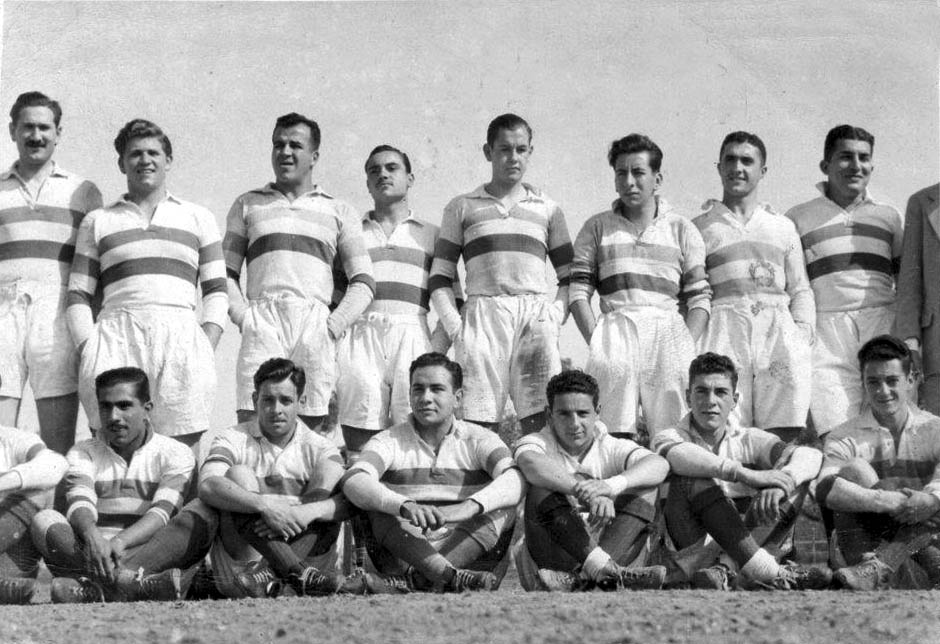
A Natación y Gimnasia rugby team in the 1940s

Playing the game since 1936, Natación y Gimnasia's rugby union section was officially founded in 1941 thus becoming the first rugby club in the province. Along with Tucumán Rugby Club, Universitario and Cardenales, Natación y Gimnasia became one of the four founding clubs of the Unión de Rugby de Tucumán.

Following the club's takeover by the Universidad Nacional de Tucumán, members of the rugby section decided to keep the old institution alive and re-founded Club Natación y Gimnasia in 1945 as a rugby union club only.

As most installations of the old club had also been taken over by UNT, the new club had to find somewhere to play. The club used the fields originally used by the equestrianism section of Natación, until the club acquired their own installations (following another political decision) in 1988.

Today the club is one of the most successful rugby institutions in the province, having won the provincial title 8 times.

In 2012 Natación y Gimnasia started the construction of a field hockey stadium to host the 2012–14 Women's FIH Hockey World League Final that would be held in November–December 2013. With a budget of $ 20 million, this stadium has over 1,450 seats which added to the mobile grandstands that can be erected make a total capacity of over 6,400.

== Titles ==
=== Rugby union ===
- Torneo del Noroeste (8): 1947, 1949, 1955, 1957, 1961, 1995, 1996, 2016,2025
