= Estadio Monumental José Fierro =

Football stadium in Tucumán, Argentina

Coordinates: 26°48′46″S 65°11′57″W

José Fierro Stadium
- Estadio José Fierro
- Monumental
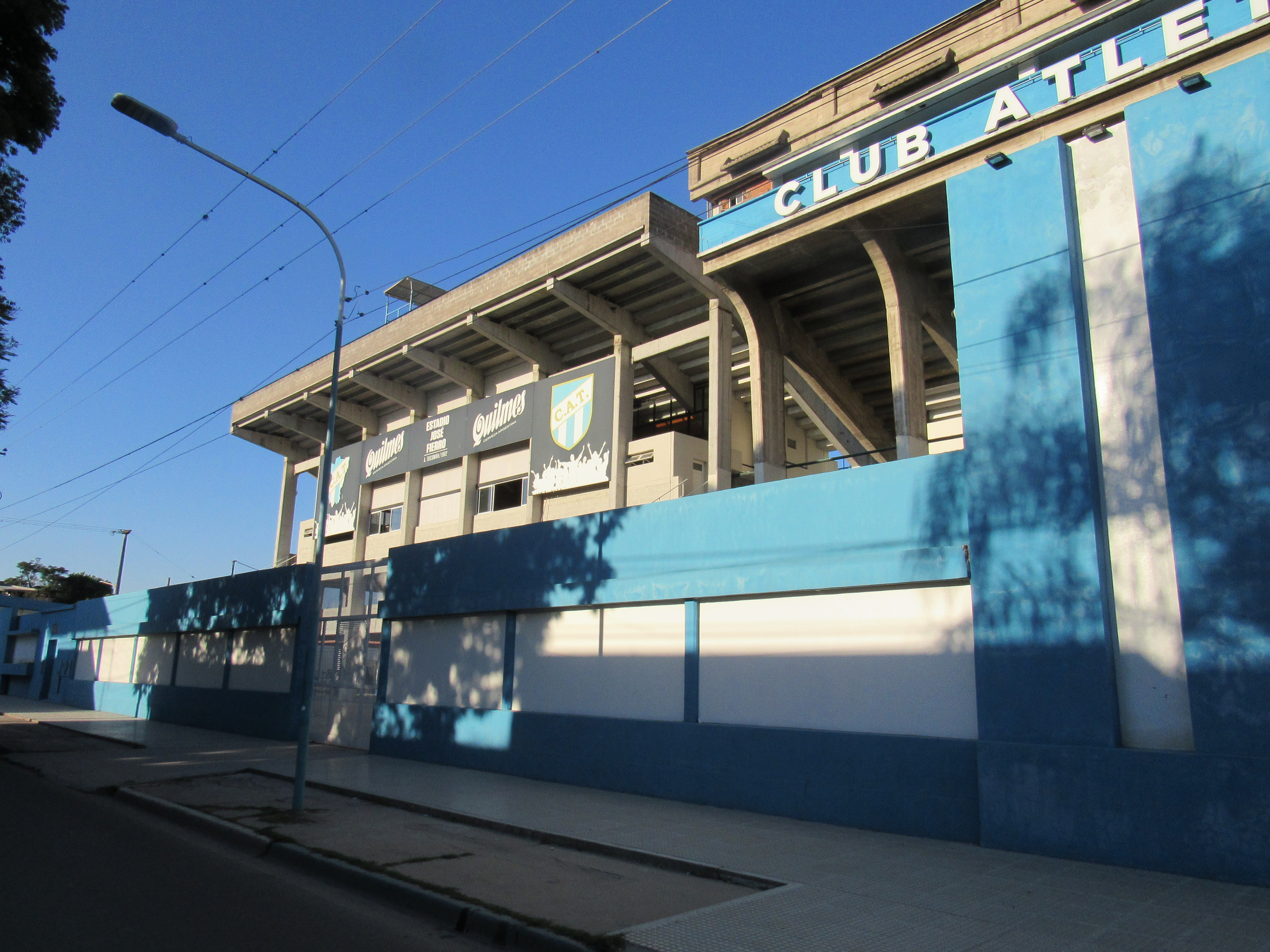
- The stadium in 2023
- Interactive map of José Fierro Stadium
- Former names: Grand Stadium
- Address: 25 de Mayo 1351; S.M. Tucumán; Argentina
- Owner: Atlético Tucumán
- Operator: Atlético Tucumán
- Capacity: 35,200
- Event: Sporting events
- Surface: Grass
- Field size: 105 x 70 m

Construction
- Built: 1922
- Opened: May 21, 1922; 104 years ago
- Architect: José Graña

Tenants
- Atlético Tucumán (1922–present); Argentina rugby team (1995–present); Tucumán Rugby Union team

Website
- clubatleticotucuman.com.ar/estadio

The Estadio José Fierro (nicknamed Monumental) is a football stadium in the city of San Miguel de Tucumán in Tucumán Province, Argentina. It is the home ground for Club Atlético Tucumán. The stadium's capacity is now 35,200 due to extensive remodeling of the stadium.

The stadium also hosted games of the Argentina national rugby union team. Besides, the Tucumán Rugby Union representative has also played at Atlético Tucumán facing national sides touring on Argentina.

== History ==
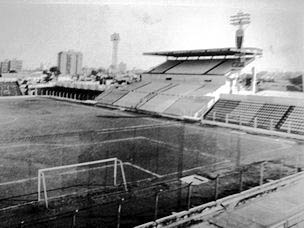
The stadium in the 1930s

The stadium was designed by Spanish architect José Graña. It was completed in 1922 and had a capacity for 5,000 spectators. It was inaugurated on May 21 of the same year and was originally baptized as "Grand Stadium" due to its monumental characteristics that made it the largest in dimensions in all of northern Argentina. For the occasion, the entire Racing Club de Avellaneda was invited.

As time passed, it was given the name "José Fierro" Monumental Stadium, in honor of the former president of the institution, José Fierro.

It was the first roofed stadium in Tucumán, and the first to have a high grandstand. Due to its size, it is chosen for the big events that take place in the province. The dimensions are 105 x 70.20 m and both the stands and the ceiling are made of concrete, the rest of the installations are made of cement (as are some seats, the rest are made of cement). Its old capacity was 29,200 spectators.

In July 2009, 2,700 seats were added to the stadium. The construction of VIP boxes was also carried out. In 2016 more VIP boxes were built under the new grandstand.

After an announcement made by the president of Atlético Tucumán Mario Leito, in February 2019 the local construction company"Tensolite S.A." carried out a refurbishing that included 2,700 new seats and VIP boxes. New toilettes and access were also added. As a result of the various works that increased the total capacity of the stadium, it currently stands at 35,200 people.

Atlético Tucumán drew an average home attendance of 28,714 in the 2024 Argentine Primera División.

== Rugby ==
The ground has been also used by the Argentina national rugby union team. A 24–16 defeat by Scotland in June 2010 was the first time Argentina had lost at the ground, after seven previous wins. In 2014, it hosted one of two Admiral Brown Cup matches when Argentina faced Ireland.

Los Pumas also played France at Estadio José Fierro in 2012 and 2016.

On the other hand, the Tucumán Rugby Union team has also played at the stadium v national sides touring on Argentina. Some of the URT rivals at Estadio José Fierro were France (1988, 1992, and 1996.), England (1990) New Zealand (1991) South Africa (1993, 2000), and Australia (1997, and 2002).
