= Club Universitario de Córdoba =

Argentine sports club

Universitario (Córdoba)
- Full name: Club Universitario de Córdoba
- Nicknames: La U
- Sport: List: Basketball; Field hockey; Football; Handball; Rugby union; Swimming; Volleyball
- Founded: 8 April 1907; 119 years ago
- League: Torneo de Córdoba (rugby); Súper 8 (field hockey)
- Based in: Córdoba, Argentina
- Colors
- Chairman: Fernando Iglesias
- Affiliations: Unión Cordobesa (rugby); Federación Cordobesa (hockey)
- Championships: Torneo de Córdoba: 20
- Website: clubuniversitariocba.com

Club Universitario de Córdoba (familiarly known as La U) is a sports club headquartered in Barrio Alto Alberdi in the city of Córdoba. The rugby union team currently plays at the Torneo de Córdoba, the regional league organised by Unión Cordobesa de Rugby (UCR).

In field hockey, Universitario is affiliated to amateur Córdoba Field Hockey Federation, where its teams compete.

The institution also hosts the practise of other sports disciplines such as basketball, football, handball, swimming and volleyball.

== History ==
The club was founded on 8 April 1907 when the representatives of Medicine, Engineering and Law Universities met at the Café Del Plata with the purpose of creating an athletic club, inspired by the institution founded in Medicine University a year before.

Universitario de Córdoba was a founding member of the Unión Cordobesa de Rugby, winning the first ever Cordobeso tournament's title in 1931. Universitario has won the most provincial championships with 20 titles, however its last win was in 1977. In recent years Uni have struggled to make an impact on the competition. Club's drop in form coinciding with the arrivals of much younger clubs such as Tala and La Tablada who have dominated cordobeso rugby since the 1970s.

== Titles ==
=== Rugby ===
- Torneo de Córdoba
  - Champions (20): 1931, 1932, 1933, 1934, 1935, 1936, 1941, 1942, 1945,
    1956, 1957, 1958, 1959, 1960, 1961, 1962, 1963, 1964, 1976, 1977
