= Santiago Mesón =

Argentine rugby union player (born 1968)

- Born: Santiago Estebán Mesón; January 25, 1968 (age 58) San Miguel de Tucumán
- Height: 180 cm (5 ft 11 in)
- Weight: 90 kg (198 lb)

Rugby union career
- Position: Fullback
Senior career
Years	Team	Apps	(Points)
1985-1993	Tucumán Rugby Club		
1993-1999	San Isidro Club		
International career
Years	Team	Apps	(Points)
1987-1997	Argentina	34	(365)

Santiago Estebán Mesón (born 25 January 1968 in San Miguel de Tucumán) is a former Argentine rugby union player. He played as a fullback.

Méson started his career at Tucumán Rugby Club, in 1976/77, joining the first category in 1985/86. He would play there until 1992/93. He moved then to S.I.C., where he played from 1993/94 to 1998/99, when he finished his career. He won the Nacional de Clubes in 1994. He also won the URBA Championship in 1994 and 1997.

Méson had 34 caps for Argentina, from 1987 to 1997, scoring 8 tries, 68 conversions, 63 penalties and 1 drop goal, in an aggregate of 365 points. He was one of the top scorers for Argentina during his international career. He was called for the 1991 Rugby World Cup, playing in a single game, without scoring, and for the 1995 Rugby World Cup, but never leaving the bench.
