= Teqüe Rugby Club =

Argentinian rugby union club, based in Maipú, Mendoza

(Argentina) Teqüé
- Full name: Teqüé Rugby Club
- Union: URC
- Founded: December 16, 1973; 52 years ago
- Location: Maipú, Mendoza, Argentina
- Region: Cuyo
- Chairman: Ricardo Iúdica
- Captain: Lucas Flores
- League: Top 10
- 2025: 4th.
Team kit

Teqüé Rugby Club is an Argentine rugby union and field hockey club located in the city of Maipú in Mendoza Province. The rugby team currently plays in the regionalised Torneo del Oeste.

== History ==
Teqüé Rugby Club was founded by former players and managers of Club Obras Sanitarias, on December 16, 1973.

The word Teqüé means "young Guanaco" in Araucanian language. Besides, a guanaco is the emblem of the Unión de Rugby de Cuyo. When Teqûe was founded, a young guanaco was adopted due to the club was the youngest in the region by then.

The first years Teqüe played in the Club Chacras de Coria field. The club has played matches against some of the most notable teams of Buenos Aires, such as SIC, San Cirano, Los Matreros. Teqüe also disputed international games facing Bordeaux Etudiants, Vascos de Baigorri and Stade Français (France), Birkenhead Park FC, Dauntsey's School (England), Garda (Ireland), University of Edinburg (Scotland), Walcha (Australia), Universidad Católica, Universidad de Chile and Chile national team.

In 2022, Teqüe won their first Torneo del Oeste championship after defeating Marista 26–24 in the final.

== Titles ==
- Torneo del Oeste (1): 2022
- Torneo del Interior B (1): 2023
