= Jockey Club Córdoba =

Córdoba-based Argentine sports club

- Founded: 26 January 1887; 138 years ago
- Location: Córdoba, Argentina
- League(s): Torneo de Córdoba (Rugby); Súper 8 (Field hockey)
- Affiliations: Unión Cordobesa (Rugby); Federación Amateur (Field hockey)
- Activities: List: Basque pelota; Billiards; Field hockey; Football; Golf; Handball; Horse racing; Rugby union; Show jumping; Swimming; Tennis
- Colors: (Scarlet, White)
- Website: jockeyclubcordoba.com.ar

Jockey Club Córdoba is an Argentine sports club based in Córdoba, Argentina. One of the wealthiest clubs in Argentina, the Jockey Club counts more than 1,500 members, possessing its own horse racetrack and golf course in the Barrio Jardín district.

Some sports that can be practised at the club are basque pelota, billiards, field hockey, football, golf, handball, show jumping, rugby union, swimming, and tennis.

== History ==
In 1881, Córdoba promulgated the first law that regulated horse racing. Six years later, Governor of Córdoba, José Echenique, signed a decree establishing three races per year, in March, May and July. The decree also stated the sizes of prizes and the rules for competitors.

In January 1887, "Jockey Club Córdoba" was founded to encourage equestrianism in the province, just five years after its Buenos Aires' counterpart, as General Paz racecourse's resident horse racing club. In December, then President of Argentina, Miguel Juárez Celman, during his visit to Córdoba, attended the first races at the recently opened horse track, named "Hipódromo Nacional".

Along the years Jockey Club acquired new installations, including 65 hectares outside of the city. On this piece of land, nicknamed "country", a golf course would be built as well as fields to practice rugby union, field hockey, show jumping, polo, tennis and many other sports.

== Facilities ==
The club has three facilities for the practise of sports and social activities:

Rugby kit
- Sede Centro: Where headquarters are also located, it was inaugurated in 1946. The installations include a gym, a restaurant, a library with a reading room, a dance hall and bars.
- Country Deportivo: Where most of the sports are practised. The facility counts four show jumping tracks, seven rugby union fields, four hockey fields (2 of them with synthetic surface), three basque pelota courts, fifteen clay tennis courts, four show jumping courts and a gym.
- Hipódromo Barrio Jardín: This is the horse racetrack of the club, which is also the only racetrack in the city of Córdoba, it is located in the Barrio Jardín district of Córdoba. The building has four grandstands (one of them exclusively for members). One of the traditional races held there is the "Clásico San Jerónimo", established in 1940 and considered today one of the most important turf events in Córdoba. The facility has also an 18-hole golf course, built in 1997.

== Sports ==
Apart from its equestrian activities, rugby union has been played at Jockey since the 1930s and today more than 600 players are registered with the club, making the institution one of the largest clubs of the Unión Cordobesa de Rugby. The team's historical rival is Córdoba A.C. and to a lesser extent, Universitario.

The senior rugby team plays in the Torneo de Córdoba, the first division of the Unión Cordobesa league system. The club counts seven rugby fields in the Country Deportivo facility.

Field hockey has been the most successful sport of the club, with 8 championships won by women's team and 7 titles won by men's section. Jockey Club counts more than 500 hockey players at all levels. The club is affiliated to amateur Córdoba Field Hockey Federation, where its teams compete.

== Titles ==
=== Rugby union ===
- Torneo del Interior (2): 1998, 1999
- Torneo de Córdoba (10): 1946, 1947, 1948, 1949, 1950, 1951, 1954, 1956, 1958, 1993
