= Lisandro Arbizu =

Argentina international rugby union player (born 1971)

- Born: Lisandro Arbizu; September 29, 1971 (age 55) Buenos Aires, Argentina
- Height: 1.78 m (5 ft 10 in)
- Weight: 83 kg (13 st 1 lb)
- University: University argentina de la Empressa

Rugby union career
- Position(s): Fly-half, Inside centre
- Current team: San Isidro Rugby Club
Senior career
Years	Team	Apps	(Points)
1990–97	Belgrano		
1997–00	Brive		
2000–03	Bègles-Bordeaux		
2003–04	Paloise		
2004–05	Bayonne		
2005–06	Paloise		
2006–07	Parma		
2007–12	Capoterra		
2012-	Valladolid		
International career
Years	Team	Apps	(Points)
1990–2005	Argentina	86	(184)
Coaching career
- Years: Team
- 2008–12: Capoterra
- 2012–2025: Valladolid
- 2025-: San Isidro Rugby Club

Lisandro Arbizu (born September 29, 1971 in Buenos Aires) is an Argentine rugby union footballer. He plays at fly-half or inside centre. He began playing for the local traditional club Belgrano Athletic Club and was one of the first Argentine players to migrate into the professional rugby in Europe.

He played with four clubs in France: CA Brive, CA Bordeaux-Bègles Gironde, Section Paloise and Aviron Bayonnais. As of the 2006-07 season, he plays for Italian club Gran Parma Rugby.

At only 19 years of age he made his debut against Ireland in October 1990 and has been with Los Pumas since. In 1992 against Spain, he became the country's youngest captain ever at the age of 21. Has earned 86 caps for his national side and has 184 test points (17 tries, 14 penalties, 11 drops and 14 goals). He played in three Rugby World Cups, in 1991, 1995 and 1999, and missed his chance in 2003 due to injury.

== Statistics ==
Tests: 86

2005: 11/6 vs. Italy (1 try); 17/6 vs. Italy

2003: 14/6: vs. France; 20/6: vs. France (1 Drop); 23/8: vs. United States; 30/8 vs. Canada.

2002: 15/6: vs. France; 2/11: vs. Australia; 16/11: vs. Italy; 23/11: vs. Ireland;

2001: 23/6: vs. New Zealand (1 try); 14/7: vs. Italy; 10/11: vs. Wales; 18/11: vs. Scotland; 1/12: vs. New Zealand (2 tries);

2000: 17/6: vs. Australia; 24/6: vs. Australia; 12/11: vs. South Africa; 25/11: vs. England;

1999: 5/6: vs. Wales; 12/6: vs. Wales; 21/8: vs. Scotland; 28/8: vs. Ireland; RWC: 1/10: vs. Wales; 10/10: vs. Samoa; 16/10: vs. Japan; 20/10: vs. Ireland; 24/10: vs. France (1 Try);

1998: 13/6: vs. France (2 Penalties and 1 goal); 20/6: vs. France (3 Penalties and 1 Drop); 8/8: vs. Romania (1 Try); 15/8: vs. United States; 22/8: vs. Canada; 7/11: vs. Italy 14/11: vs. France (3 Penalties); 21/11: vs. Wales;

1997: 31/5: vs. England (1 Try); 7/6: vs. England; 21/6: vs. New Zealand; 28/6: vs. New Zealand; 18/10: vs. Romania; 22/10: vs. Italy; 26/10: vs. France (1 Penalty and 1 Drop); 1/11: vs. Australia; 8/11: vs. Australia;

1996: 8/6: vs. Uruguay; 14/9: vs. United States; 18/9: vs. Uruguay; 21/9: vs. Canada; 9/11: vs. South Africa; 16/11: vs. South Africa; 14/12: vs. England;

1995: 24/9: vs. Paraguay; 30/9: vs. Chile; 8/10: vs. Uruguay; 14/10: vs. Romania; 17/10: vs. Italy; 21/10: vs. France; RWC: 27/5: vs. England (1 Try, 2 Penalties and 1 goal); 30/5: vs. Samoa; 4/6: vs. Italy; 30/4: vs. Australia (1 Goal); 6/5: vs. Australia; (1 try); 4/3: vs. Uruguay;

1993: 15/5: vs. Japan (1 Try); 22/5: vs. Japan (1 Try); 2/10: vs. Brazil; 11/10: vs. Chile (2 Penalties and 7 Goals); 16/10: vs. Paraguay (1 Try); 23/10: vs. Uruguay; 6/11: vs. South Africa; 13/11: vs. South Africa (1 Drop);

1992: 4/7: vs. France (1 Drop); 11/7: vs. France (1 Drop); 26/9: vs. Spain (1 Try); 25/10: vs. Spain; 31/10: vs. Romania; 14/11: vs. France (1 Drop);

1991: 6/7: vs. New Zealand; 13/7: vs. New Zealand; 15/8: vs. Chile (2 Drops); RWC: 4/10: vs. Australia (2 Drops); 9/10: vs. Wales; 13/10: vs. Samoa (1 Penalty and 1 Goal);

1990: 27/10: vs. Ireland; 10/11: vs. Scotland;
