= Club La Tablada =

Argentine rugby union and field hockey club

(Argentina) La Tablada
- Full name: Club La Tablada
- Union: UCR
- Founded: 24 July 1943; 82 years ago
- Location: Córdoba, Argentina
- Ground: El Bosque
- President: Rubén Gigli
- League: Top 10
- 2025: 1st. of Zona Promoción
Team kit

Official website
- clublatablada.com.ar

La Tablada Rugby Club is a sports club based in the city of Córdoba, Argentina. Founded in 1943 as a social institution, La Tablada started its sports activities in the 1950s.

The club is mostly known for its rugby union team, which participates in competitions organised by the Unión Cordobesa de Rugby (UCR). The club has also a women's field hockey team (affiliated to Federación Amateur Cordobesa de Hockey sobre Césped). Tennis is other sport practised at La Tablada.

== History ==
First named "El Club de la Parroquia de La Tablada" it was originally a social club founded by members of La Tablada parish in Córdoba. Some members of this club were already playing rugby for Córdoba Athletic and decided to form their own team.

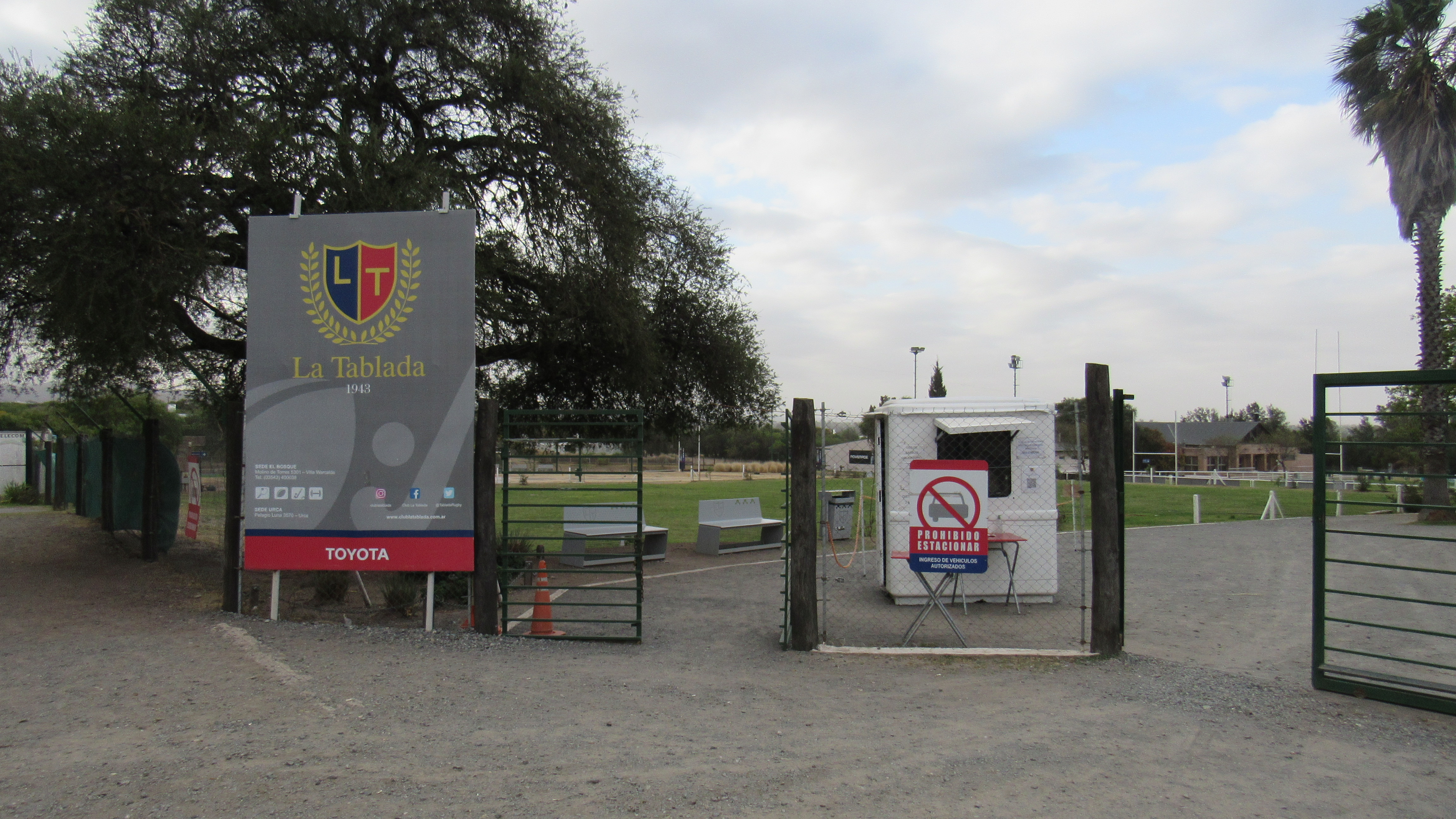
Club entrance in 2020

In 1954, Bamba Rugby Club was founded in the Vélez Sarsfield district of Córdoba and played its first game against Córdoba Athletic. After changing locations many times and looking for a place where establish its facilities, Bamba Rugby Club came back to La Tablada social club and the two decided to merge and become "La Tablada Rugby Club" in 1955.

Since 1955, La Tablada has become one of the most successful teams of cordobés rugby, winning the Torneo de Córdoba title 14 times, apart from 3 Torneo del Interior championships and a Nacional de Clubes title in 1999. La Tablada also takes part in the Torneo Regional, having won a championship in 2003.

La Tablada's main rival is Tala, both clubs play El Clásico.

In field hockey, the club is affiliated to amateur Córdoba Field Hockey Federation, where its teams compete.

== Titles ==
- Nacional de Clubes (1): 1999
- Torneo del Interior (3): 2001, 2010, 2011
- Torneo Regional del Centro (1): 2003
- Torneo de Córdoba (17): 1961, 1963, 1965, 1966, 1978, 1987, 1988, 1991, 1994, 1997, 2000, 2001, 2003, 2006, 2011, 2012, 2013
- Sudamericano de Clubes (1): 2000
