= Torneo del Oeste =

Torneo del Oeste – Top 10
- Organiser(s): URC
- Founded: 2000; 26 years ago
- Region: Cuyo
- Teams: 10
- Qualifier for: Torneo del Interior
- Related competitions: Top 12
- Current champions: Marista (9th. title)
- Most championships: Los Tordos (10 titles)
- Website: urc.com.ar/top10

The Torneo Regional del Oeste, commonly known as the Regional de Cuyo Top 10, is a regional rugby union competition in Argentina. The competition was first held in 2000 and involves 8 clubs from the unions of Cuyo (Mendoza), San Luis, and San Juan provinces).

This annual tournament has traditionally been dominated by Mendocino clubs. As in other inter-provincial tournaments, such as the Torneo del Litoral or Torneo del Noroeste, the best placed clubs in the Torneo del Oeste qualify for the Torneo del Interior.

== History ==
The Unión de Rugby de Cuyo was founded on 22 September 1945, for clubs from the provinces of Mendoza and in western Argentina.

The competition started in 1946 and has taken part every year since. San Juan clubs seceded in 1952, and founded the Unión Sanjuanina de Rugby, but still took part in the tournament. The last union to take part in the competition, Unión de Rugby de San Luis, was founded much later, in 1977.

Traditionally, the Torneo del Oeste has been dominated by clubs from Mendoza.

== Formula ==
The tournament, named "Regional de Cuyo Top 10" is contested by ten clubs competing in different levels, from the top division ("Primera") to lower levels.

== List of champions ==
All the champions are listed below:

Ed.	Year	Champion	Score	Runner-up
1	2000	Marista (1)	38–16	(Chile) Universidad Católica
2	2001	Los Tordos (1)	20–5	Marista
3	2002	Los Tordos (2)	20–17	Marista
4	2003	Los Tordos (3)	35–28	Mendoza R.C.
5	2004	Los Tordos (4)	25–19	Mendoza R.C.
6	2005	Mendoza R.C. (1)	35–18	Marista
7	2006	Marista (2)	26–3	Teqüe
8	2007	Mendoza R.C. (2)	25–22	Los Tordos
9	2008	Los Tordos (5)	14–6	Teqüe
10	2009	Liceo (1)	28–14	Marista
11	2010	Liceo (2)	11–8	Marista
12	2011	Marista (3)	22–21	Liceo
13	2012	Liceo (3)	34–27	Marista
14	2013	Los Tordos (6)	26–23	Liceo
15	2014	Los Tordos (7)	34–33	Marista
16	2015	Marista (4)	20–13	Mendoza R.C.
17	2016	Liceo (4)	28–25	Marista
18	2017	Los Tordos (8)	32–20	Liceo
19	2018	Los Tordos (9)	22–20	Marista
20	2019	Marista (5)	20–12	Los Tordos
–	2020	(not held) (Note: Tournament cancelled due to the COVID-19 pandemic in Argentina.)		
21	2021 Ap. (Note: "Torneo Apertura" (taking the term from football terminology to refer to split tournaments) organised after the delay caused by the covid pandemic in Argentina.)	Liceo (5)	– (Note: Round-robin tournament format.)	Marista
21	2021 Prov. (Note: Provincial tournament)	Los Tordos (10)	–	Liceo
21	2021	Marista (6)	20–17	Los Tordos
22	2022	Teqüe (1)	26–24	Marista
23	2023	Marista (7)	70–14	Liceo
24	2024	Marista (8)	20–13	Los Tordos
25	2025	Marista (9)	21–13	Mendoza R.C.

== Titles by club ==
Club	Titles	Years won
Los Tordos	10	2001, 2002, 2003, 2004, 2008, 2013, 2014, 2017, 2018, 2021 Prov.
Marista	9	2000, 2006, 2011, 2015, 2019, 2021, 2023, 2024, 2025
Liceo	5	2009, 2010, 2012, 2016, 2021 Ap.
Mendoza R.C.	2	2005, 2007
Teqüe	1	2022
