= Tala Rugby Club =

(Argentina) Tala
- Full name: Tala Rugby Club
- Union: UCR
- Founded: 11 November 1944; 81 years ago
- Location: Córdoba, Argentina
- Ground: Estadio de Tala RC
- President: Eduardo Giaimo
- League: Torneo de Córdoba
- 2025: Champion (via playoffs)
Team kit

Tala Rugby Club, or simply Tala, is an Argentine sports club sited in Villa Warcalde, a neighborhood in the city of Córdoba in the homonymous province.

The rugby union team currently plays in the Torneo de Córdoba, the first division of the Unión Cordobesa de Rugby league system. With 25 provincial titles won, Tala is the most winning team of that competition.

Apart from rugby, Tala also hosts the practise of field hockey, tennis, and swimming.

== History ==
The club was founded on November 11, 1944, by rugby enthusiasts from the General Paz, Juniors and Alta Córdoba districts. The institution was established in a train coach at the backyard of Mr. Beckwit's house. His son, Arturo Beckwit, was appointed as president of the recently created entity, while the act of foundation was signed that same day.

The rail coach was used as club's seat and became a symbol of the club's bohemian spirit. The name "Tala" was taken from a celtis tala that was besides the coach, as a symbol of strength and union. The members chose black and white as the club's colours after being offered a set of playing kits which had been originally made for disbanded Club Pampero by a sporting goods store from the city. The team adopted the colors, which have remained to date.

Since its establishment in 1944, Tala has become one of the most successful clubs in Córdoba, winning the Torneo de Córdoba title 25 times and reaching the final of the Nacional de Clubes in 2006 and 2017.

Tala's main rival is La Tablada, both clubs play El Clásico.

== Stadium ==
The Tala RC Stadium has capacity for 2,000 spectators. It has been one of the stadium of the Super Rugby Americas, with Cordobese team Dogos using it as home venue until 2025, when it moved to Córdoba Athletic Club's stadium, which had a bigger capacity.

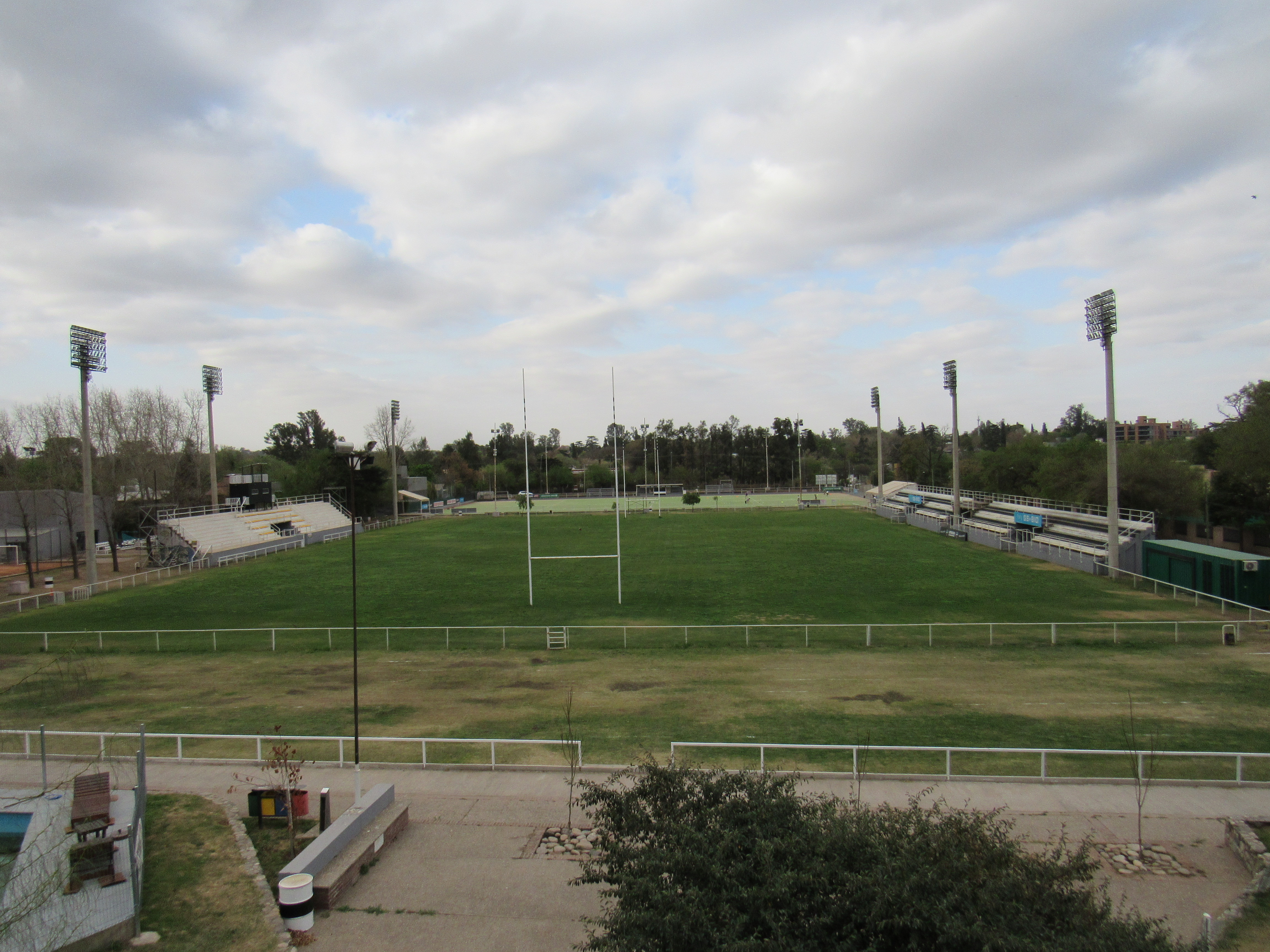

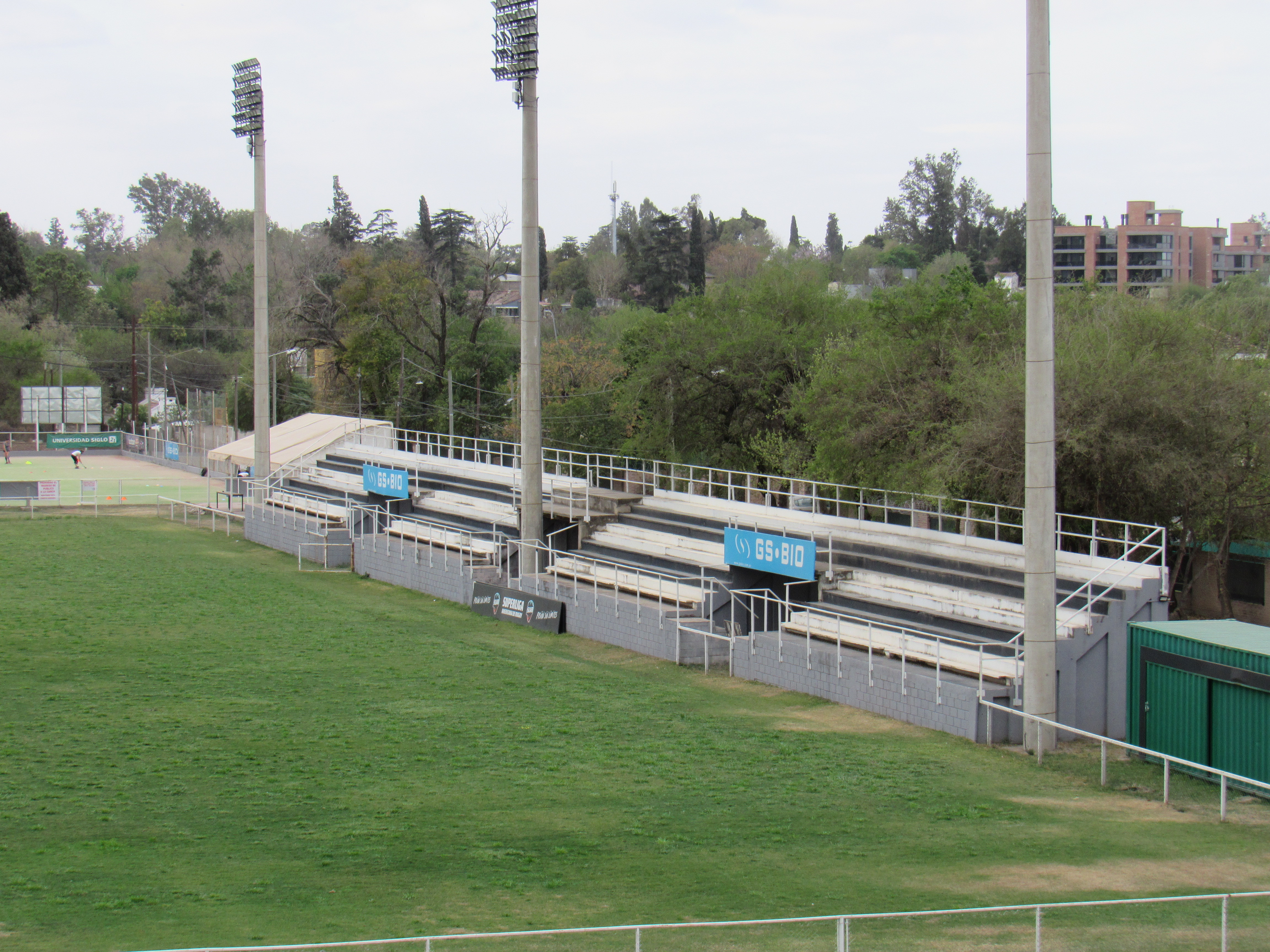

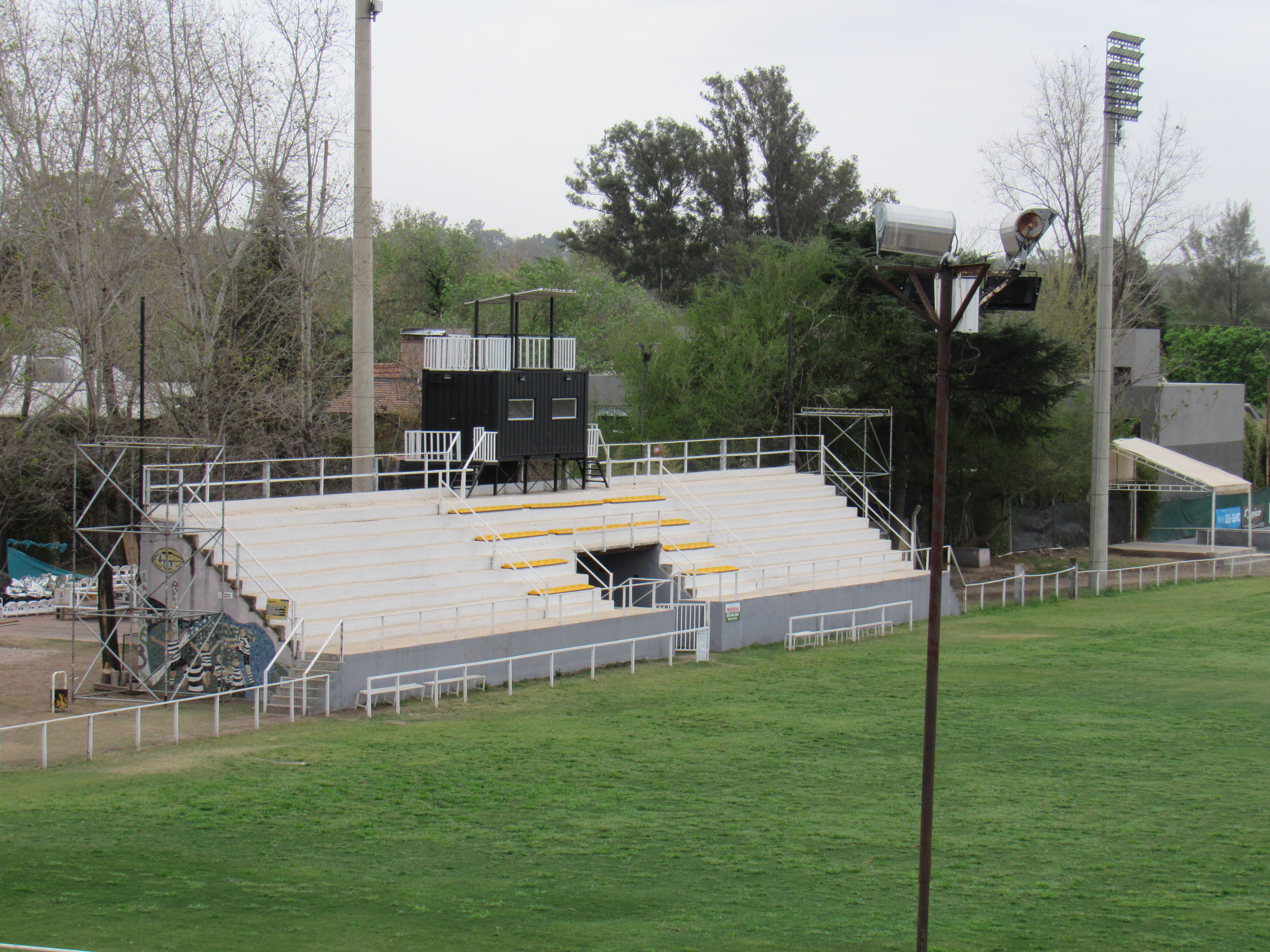

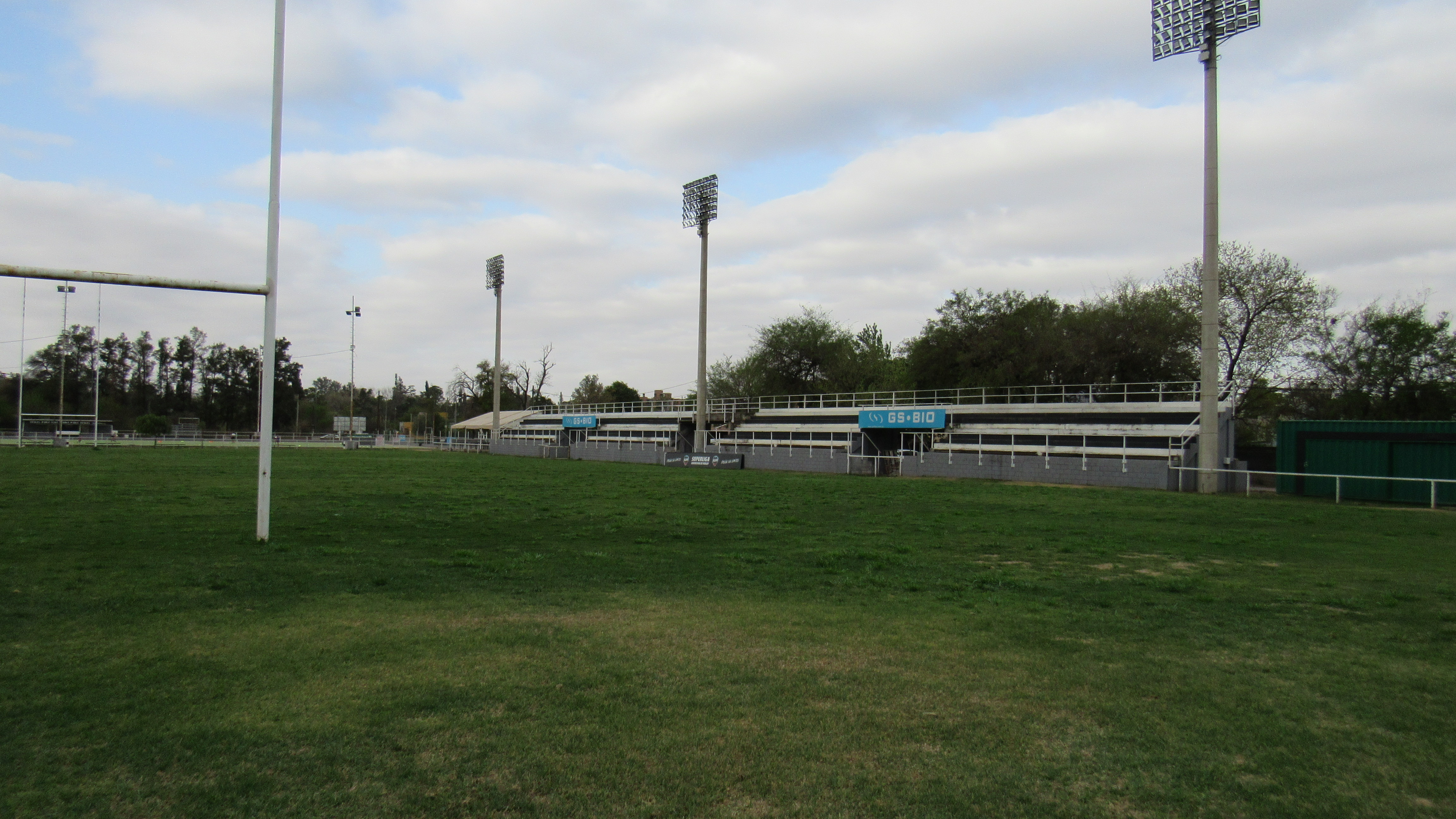

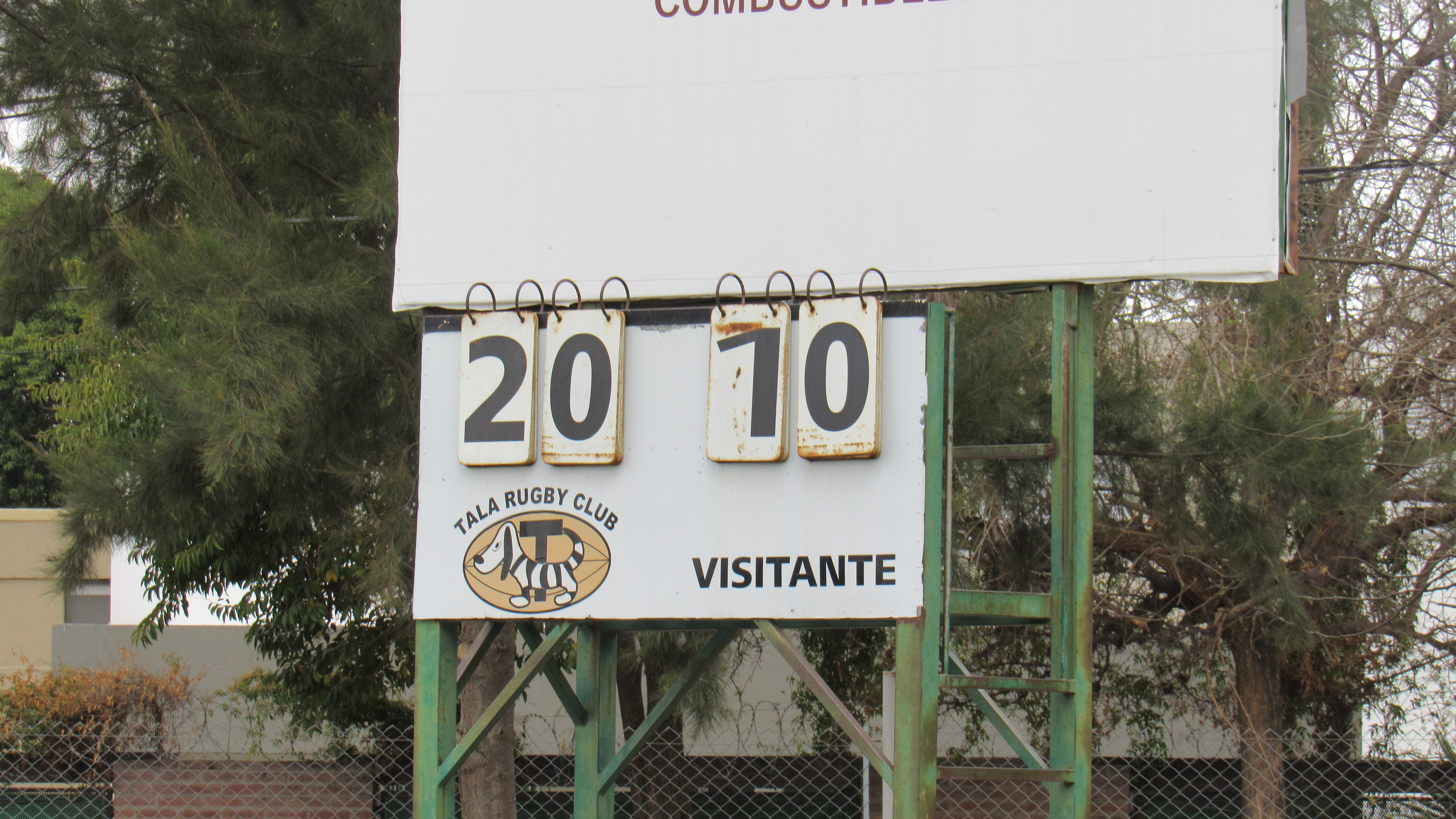

== Titles ==
- Torneo del Interior (1): 2004
- Torneo Regional del Centro (1): 2008 (Note: Title shared with Universitario de Rosario after both teams tied 18–18 in the final, with no extra time played.)
- Torneo de Córdoba (25): 1971, 1972, 1975, 1979, 1980, 1981, 1982, 1983, 1984, 1985,
  1986, 1989, 1990, 1995, 1998, 1999, 2004, 2007, 2011, 2014, 2015, 2016, 2017, 2018, 2025
