= Los Tarcos Rugby Club =

Argentinian rugby union club, based in San Miguel de Tucumán

(Argentina) Los Tarcos
- Full name: Los Tarcos Rugby Club
- Union: URT
- Founded: 4 January 1955; 71 years ago
- Location: San Miguel de Tucumán, Argentina
- Ground: Av. Brigido
- President: Fernando Martoni
- League: Torneo del Noroeste
- 2025: 9th.
Team kit

Los Tarcos Rugby Club, is an Argentine rugby union club based in the city of San Miguel de Tucumán.

The rugby union team is member of the Unión de Rugby de Tucumán and one of the most successful teams in the province, having won the provincial title 14 times and having reached the final of the Nacional de Clubes once. Many Tarcos players went on to represent Argentina at international level, including Luis Molina, Marcelo Ricci, Pablo and Fernando Buabse, Sergio Bunader and Leonardo Gravano.

== History ==
Los Tarcos Rugby Club was founded on 4 January 1955, and used public parks for the first years of its existence. The club had to wait until 1986 to get their own installations.

== Titles ==
- Torneo del Noroeste (13): 1966, 1967, 1969, 1975, 1976, 1983, 1984, 1985, 1986, 1987, 1994, 2004, 2018
