= Unión Marplatense de Rugby =

Unión de Rugby de Mar del Plata
- Sport: Rugby union
- Jurisdiction: South Center of Buenos Aires Province
- Abbreviation: URMDP
- Founded: 1951; 75 years ago
- Affiliation: UAR
- Headquarters: Mar del Plata

Official website
- unionrugbymdp.org
- (Argentina)

The Mar del Plata Rugby Union (Spanish: Unión de Rugby de Mar del Plata), abbreviated URMDP, is the organisational body that rules the game of rugby union in Mar del Plata town and cities of the south of Buenos Aires Province. The stadium of Villa Marista is used for rugby matches played by the Union representative side.

Apart from Mar del Plata, the Union has teams from the cities of Balcarce, Dolores, Mar de Ajó, Miramar, Necochea, Tandil and Villa Gesell. The union was founded in 1951, and become a member of the Argentine Rugby Union that same year.

== History ==
One of the first rugby union games held in Mar del Plata was played in 1925 by the British battleship Repulse's crew and a team composed of employees of Buenos Aires Great Southern Railway that travelled to Mar del Plata specially for the occasion. A chronicle published on local newspaper La Capital described the match as follows:

The Mar del Plata Rugby Club was the pioneer in the city, having been established on 13 July 1944. Some of the enthusiasts that made the arrangements for its foundation were Rodolfo Tonneti, José Galarce, and Alberto Hernández, some of them with a past in clubs Curupaytí and Hindú.

The first committee was formed in Hernández's house, appointing Rómulo Tamini as president of the club. The team started to practise at the beach, then moving to Campo Municipal de Deportes (Municipal Sports Field). In the spring of 1945, Buenos Aires clubs CUBA and Pucará visited the city.

(There has been) Great interest to attend this exhibition with complicated rules of the game, which main characteristics are the violence and rough of players' actions.

— La Capital, about a rugby game in the city, September 1925

As the city did not have other club than Mar del Plata RC, it only played friendly matches with clubs from neighbor cities such as Independiente (Tandil), Ita-Carú and Duperial. On 25 May 1949 a tournament was held in the city, with Mar del Plata RC, Curupaytí, Pucará and Obras Sanitarias.

To help the spread of the sport in the city, rugby union was added to programs of Nacional, Comercial and Industrial Schools, with the collaboration of Physical education teacher Carlos Vecchio. In 1950 the first "Marplatense" championship was held, with Mar del Plata RC and the aforementioned schools contesting the competition. One year later, Bigua RC (a club founded by Jorge Alvear, another teacher of Peralta Ramos Institute) added to competitions. Other clubs added later would be General Pueyrredón and Escuela de Artillería Antiaérea (then renamed "Santa Bárbara").

In August 1951 the first rugby sevens competition was organised as part of the "Second Olympic Games of Mar del Plata", with 13 teams. All the matches were held in the Municipal Park. That would be the first step to form a body, "Unión de Rugby de Mar del Plata", on 27 October 1951 with Alberto Hernández (that had also been the first president of pioneer Mar del Plata RC in 1944) as president. The emblem chosen was a four-leaf clover with the founding members (Mar del Plata RC, Comercial, Nacional, Industrial and Bigua) colors, red, green, light blue and dark blue.

At the beginning of 1952, two rugby fields were built in Parque Camet. Those fields (currently owned by the Municipality) have been used as Mar del Plata RC venue up to present days.

== Clubs ==
Affiliated clubs as of July, 2019:

Club	City
Bigua (Note: Founding member, apart from Comercial RC, Industrial RC, and Nacional RC which are no longer affiliated to the union.)	Mar del Plata
Camarones	Pinamar
Campo de Pato	Balcarce
Club Los 50	Tandil
Los Cardos RC	Tandil
Comercial	Sierra de los Padres
Gnomos	Mar de Ajó
Mar del Plata Club	Mar del Plata
Miramar RC	Miramar
Náutico Necochea	Necochea
Necochea RC	Necochea
Pampas	Dolores
Pueyrredón RC	Mar del Plata
San Ignacio Rugby	Mar del Plata
Sporting	Mar del Plata
Tiro Federal	Ayacucho
Unión del Sur	Mar del Plata
Universitario	Mar del Plata
Uncas	Tandil
Villa Gesell RC	Villa Gesell

== Competitions ==
Clubs from URMDP compete in "Torneo Regional Pampeano" (TRP), contested by teams from the Mar del Plata, Buenos Aires South and Buenos Aires West Unions. The last TRP winner is Sociedad Sportiva of Bahía Blanca.

The TRP is composed of two stages, "Clasificatorio" and "Campeonato". The first stage is contested by 8 teams, playing in a single round-robin tournament. At the end of the tournament, the six best placed teams qualify for the "Torneo Campeonato A", playing in a double round-robin where the team that totalised most points is crowned champion.

TRP also has second and third divisions (named "TRP B" and "TRP C" respectively). Only two clubs from Mar del Plata has won this competition to date, Sporting (five times) and Mar del Plata RC (four times).

There is also a women's rugby competition.

The URMDP representative side competed in defunct Campeonato Argentino, having won its only title in 1961.
