= Unión de Rugby de Tucumán =

Rugby union governing body in Argentina

- Sport: Rugby union
- Jurisdiction: Tucumán Province
- Abbreviation: URT
- Founded: February 29, 1944; 82 years ago
- Affiliation: UAR
- Headquarters: San Miguel
- President: Javier Budeguer
- Vice president: Carlos Marti Coll
- Secretary: Eugenio Acuña

Official website
- urtuc.com.ar
- (Argentina)

The Tucumán Rugby Union (Spanish: Unión de Rugby de Tucumán) or URT is the organisational body that controls the game of rugby union in the province of Tucumán, Argentina.

Established in 1944, the union has 26 clubs competing in different championships.

== History ==
Rugby was first played in Tucumán in 1915, when British enthusiasts that worked at the local sugarmills meet to play the game in the city of San Miguel de Tucumán. Nevertheless, the origins and development of rugby in the province are set in late 1930, thanks to the prize brought by professor Mario Santamarina, who considered himself to be the great propeller of rugby in the province.

The first rugby match played in Tucumán (and one that is indeed recorded in the pages of the newspaper La Gaceta) took place on September 21, 1924, at Estadio Monumental José Fierro, home to Club Atlético Tucumán, as part of the "4th Club Atlético Tucumán Tournament" organized by the institution. This sporting event also included football and athletics. That pioneer game was contested by two visiting teams, Club Atlético San Isidro (CASI), the reigning champion of Buenos Aires at the time, and a team called "Resto", made up of players from Gimnasia y Esgrima and Universitario. According to La Gaceta, CASI won 16–13.

The first match contested by local teams was held on 31 May 1935, when Tucumán Rugby Club (not the current homonymous club) defeated Club Mitre 7–0, with Santamarina playing for the winning side.

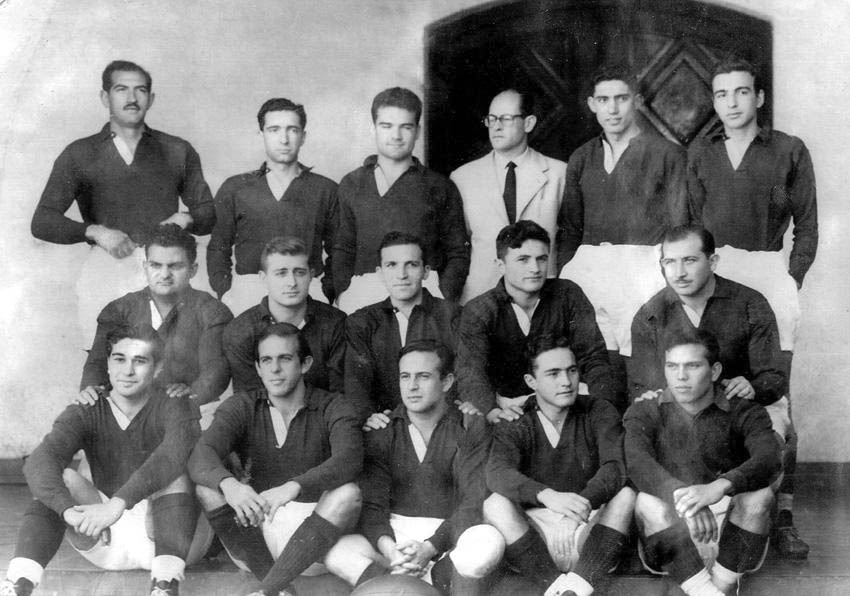
Tucumán provincial side of the 1950s, wearing the maroon shirt that would change to orange in 1970

The first official rugby team in the province –from Club Natación y Gimnasia– was formed in 1936. Six years later a new Tucumán Rugby Club was founded, followed by Universitario Rugby Club de Tucumán and Círculo Universitario (both in 1943), and Cardenales in 1944. Those four clubs would go on to establish the "Unión de Rugby del Norte" on 29 February 1944.

The union changed its name to a Spanish form "Unión de Rugby de Tucumán" in 1966. Four years later the union also changed its colors from maroon to orange. As of March 2025, the union had 26 clubs (11 affiliated and 15 invited) competing in its tournaments.

Although the URN was based in Tucumán Province it also dealt with fledgling clubs from the neighbouring provinces of Salta, Jujuy and Santiago del Estero. Later these provinces would go on to form their own unions: Unión de Rugby de Salta in 1951, Unión Jujeña de Rugby in 1966 and Unión Santiagueña de Rugby in 1968. After that the Unión de Rugby del Norte became simply known as the Unión de Rugby de Tucumán and only dealt with clubs from Tucumán Province.

== Provincial side ==
Home Kit

The URT was represented by its own team in Campeonato Argentino, a now defunct competition in which each of the 24 unions that make up the Argentine Rugby Union (UAR) participated. Tucumán participated in all the Argentino editions since 1944, playing a total of 23 finals (the first in 1966) with 11 titles won, the last in 2014.

In 1992, the provincial team achieved the most important accomplishment in their history when they defeated France 25–23 during their 1992 tour of Argentina.

=== Titles ===
- Campeonato Argentino (11): 1985, 1987, 1988, 1989, 1990, 1992, 1993, 2005, 2010, 2013, 2014

=== International matches ===
Throughout their history, Tucumán has played friendly matches against some notable international squads that were on tour of Argentina. Some of them are listed below:

Date / Event	Rival	Score	Venue
31 Aug 1966	(South Africa) Gazelles	3–80	EUDEF (Note: Acronym for "Escuela Universitaria de Educación Física" of Universidad Nacional de Tucumán.)
11 Aug 1971	(England) Oxford–Cambridge (Note: Combined side.)	9–21	EUDEF
14 Oct 1972	(South Africa) Gazelles	6–47	EUDEF
26 Oct 1976	New Zealand	15–51	Atlético Concepción Stadium (Note: Home venue of Club Atlético Concepción.)
21 Oct 1980	Fiji	9–24	Atlético Concepción Stadium
18 Jun 1985	France	7–24	Atlético Concepción Stadium
7 Jun 1988	France	18–18	Atlético Tucumán Stadium
21 Nov 1988	Māori New Zealand	3–12	Atlético Tucumán Stadium
18 Jun 1990	England	14–19	Atlético Tucumán Stadium
26 Jun 1991	New Zealand	14–19	Atlético Tucumán Stadium
23 Jun 1992	France	25–23	Atlético Tucumán Stadium
2 Nov 1993	South Africa	12–40	Atlético Tucumán Stadium

== Club competitions ==
Eleven member clubs are affiliated with the Union and take part in the union's provincial competitions. They also compete in the annual Torneo del Norte, a regional competition that also includes teams from the neighboring unions of Salta, Santiago del Estero and Jujuy.

Clubs from Tucumán have enjoyed some success in the national club tournament with Tucumán Rugby Club reaching the final twice in 1993 and 2007, and Los Tarcos Rugby Club once in 2004.

=== Torneo del Noroeste ===
Tucumán clubs take part in the Torneo del Noroeste (or simply Torneo del NOA), along with teams from Salta, Jujuy and Santiago del Estero.

The Noroeste tournament has traditionally been dominated by clubs from Tucumán, clubs from the other 3 provinces have yet to win a title. The most successful teams are Universitario and Tucumán Rugby Club with 21 and 20 titles respectively.

Every year, the best ranked teams from the Noroeste go on to play in the annual Torneo del Interior, where they meet teams from the country's other regional tournaments: Litoral, Centro, Noreste, Pampeana, Oeste and Patagónico.

The two finalists of the Interior then go on to meet the two finalists of the Buenos Aires League in the Nacional de Clubes competition.

So far, two clubs from Tucumán have reached the final of the Nacional: Tucumán RC in 1993 and 2007 and Los Tarcos in 2004. However, both clubs lost and a Tucumán club has yet to win the national title.

=== Local competitions ===
Like all other provincial unions, the URT organises local competitions for underage and reserve teams.

== Member clubs ==
- Aguara Guazú
- Bajo Fondo
- Cardenales
- Coipu (Famaillá)
- Corsarios
- Huirapuca
- Jockey Club
- Lince
- La Querencia
- San Isidro RC (Lules)
- Tafí Viejo
- Los Tarcos
- Natación y Gimnasia
- Tucumán Lawn Tennis
- Tucumán RC
- Universitario de Tucumán

== See also ==
- Torneo del Noroeste
