= Torneo de Córdoba (rugby union) =

Top 10 A
- Current season, competition or edition: 2025
- Sport: Rugby union
- Founded: 1931; 95 years ago
- No. of teams: 10
- Country: Argentina
- Confederation: UCR
- Most recent champion: Tala (25th. title) (2025)
- Most titles: Tala (25 titles)
- Broadcaster: ESPN
- Level on pyramid: 2
- Related competitions: URBA Top 12

The Top 10 A, also known as Top 10 de Córdoba or Torneo de Córdoba, is an annual rugby union competition in Argentina. The tournament involves clubs affiliated to the Córdoba Rugby Union (UCR), and is one of several regional competitions held in Argentina every year.

The 2019 edition is named "Enrique Rudy Schmal" in honour of a former president of the UCR, died in 2018.

== Format ==
As of 2025, the tournament is contested by 10 clubs, 8 from the last Primera División season plus the 2 best placed teams of Torneo de Ascenso in the previous season. Teams are play each other in a single round-robin format. The four best placed teams of each zone qualify for the semifinals, then advancing to the final where the regional champion is decided.

Champion and runner-up of Torneo de Córdoba qualify for the Nacional de Clubes, the main club competition of Argentina while the other best placed teams qualify for Torneo del Interior, the national club competition outside Buenos Aires.

== List of championships ==
Since 1931, all the champions year-by-year:

Ed.	Year	Champion(s)
1	1931	Universitario (1)
2	1932	Universitario (2)
3	1933	Universitario (3)
4	1934	Universitario (4)
5	1935	Universitario (5)
6	1936	Universitario (6)
7	1937	Córdoba RC (Note: Not to be confused with Córdoba Athletic Club) (1)
8	1938	Córdoba RC (2)
9	1939	San Martín (1)
10	1940	San Martín (2)
11	1941	Universitario (7)
12	1942	Universitario (8)
13	1943	San Martín (3)
14	1944	Gimnasia y Esgrima (1)
15	1945	Universitario (9)
16	1946	Jockey Club (1)
17	1947	Jockey Club (2)
18	1948	Jockey Club (3)
19	1949	Jockey Club (4)
20	1950	Jockey Club (5)
21	1951	Jockey Club (6)
22	1952	Córdoba AC (1)
23	1953	Escuela de Aviación (1)
24	1954	Jockey Club (7)
25	1955	Córdoba AC (2)
26	1956	Universitario (10) and Jockey Club (8) (Note: Title shared.)
27	1957	Universitario (11)
28	1958	Universitario (12) and Jockey Club (9)
29	1959	Universitario (13)
30	1960	Universitario (14)
31	1961	Universitario (15) and La Tablada (1)
32	1962	Universitario (16) and Córdoba AC (3)
33	1963	Universitario (17) and La Tablada (2)
34	1964	Universitario (18)
35	1965	La Tablada (3)
36	1966	La Tablada (4)
37	1967	Córdoba AC (4)
38	1968	Córdoba AC (5)
39	1969	Córdoba AC (6)
40	1970	Córdoba AC (7)
41	1971	Tala (1)
42	1972	Tala (2)
43	1973	Córdoba AC (8)
44	1974	Córdoba AC (9)
45	1975	Tala (3)
46	1976	Universitario (19)
47	1977	Universitario (20)
48	1978	La Tablada (5)
49	1979	Tala (4)
50	1980	Tala (5)
51	1981	Tala (6)
52	1982	Tala (7) and Córdoba AC (10)
53	1983	Tala (8)
54	1984	Tala (9)
55	1985	Tala (10)
56	1986	Tala (11)
57	1987	La Tablada (6)
58	1988	La Tablada (7)
59	1989	Tala (12)
60	1990	Tala (13)
61	1991	La Tablada (8)
62	1992	Córdoba AC (11)
63	1993	Jockey Club (10)
64	1994	La Tablada (9)
65	1995	Tala (14)
66	1996	Córdoba AC (12)
67	1997	La Tablada (10)
68	1998	Tala (15)
69	1999	Tala (16)
70	2000	La Tablada (11)
71	2001	La Tablada (12)
72	2002	Palermo Bajo (1)
73	2003	La Tablada (13)
74	2004	Tala (17)
75	2005	Córdoba AC (13)
76	2006	La Tablada (14)
77	2007	Tala (18)
78	2008	Córdoba AC (14)
79	2009	Jockey Club (Villa María) (1)
80	2010	Córdoba AC (15)
81	2011	La Tablada (15), Córdoba AC (16), and Tala (19)
82	2012	La Tablada (16)
83	2013	La Tablada (17)
84	2014	Tala (20)
85	2015	Tala (21)
86	2016	Tala (22)
87	2017	Tala (23)
88	2018	Tala (24)
89	2019	Urú Curé (1)
–	2020	(not held due to the COVID-19 pandemic)
90	2021	Jockey Club (11)
91	2022	Jockey Club (12)
92	2023	Córdoba AC (17)
93	2024	Córdoba AC (18)
94	2025	Tala (25)

== Titles by club ==
Team	Titles	Years won
Tala	25	1971, 1972, 1975, 1979, 1980, 1981, 1982, 1983, 1984, 1985, 1986, 1989, 1990, 1995, 1998, 1999, 2004, 2007, 2011, 2014, 2015, 2016, 2017, 2018, 2025
Universitario	20	1931, 1932, 1933, 1934, 1935, 1936, 1941, 1942, 1945, 1956, 1957, 1958, 1959, 1960, 1961, 1962, 1963, 1964, 1976, 1977
Córdoba AC	18	1952, 1955, 1962, 1967, 1968, 1969, 1970, 1973, 1974, 1982, 1992, 1996, 2005, 2008, 2010, 2011, 2023, 2024
La Tablada	17	1961, 1963, 1965, 1966, 1978, 1987, 1988, 1991, 1994, 1997, 2000, 2001, 2003, 2006, 2011, 2012, 2013
Jockey Club	12	1946, 1947, 1948, 1949, 1950, 1951, 1954, 1956, 1958, 1993, 2021, 2022
San Martín	3	1939, 1940, 1943
Córdoba RC	2	1937, 1938
Gimnasia y Esgrima	1	1944
Escuela de Aviación	1	1953
Palermo Bajo	1	2002
Jockey Club (Villa María)	1	2009
Urú Curé	1	2019
