= Universitario Rugby Club de Tucumán =

Argentinian sports institution

(Argentina) Universitario (Tucumán)
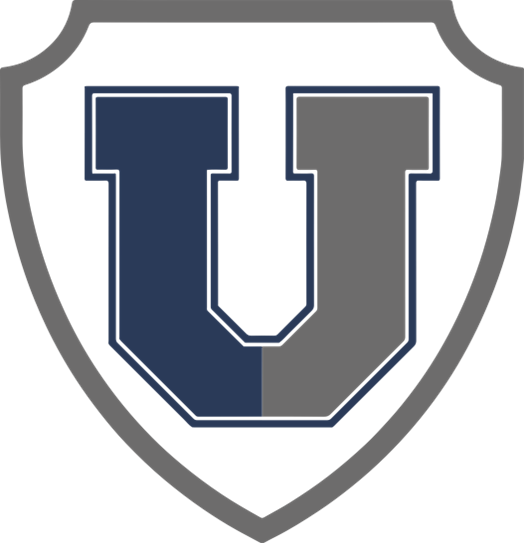
- Full name: Universitario Rugby Club
- Union: Tucumán
- Nickname: Uni
- Founded: 21 September 1943; 82 years ago
- Location: San Miguel de Tucumán Argentina
- Ground: Jorge Ghiringhelli Field
- President: Carlos Villalonga
- Coach: Gonzalo Triviño
- League: Torneo Regional del NOA
Team kit

Universitario Rugby Club is an Argentine sports institution for women's field hockey and men's rugby union based in the city of San Miguel de Tucumán.

As a rugby team, it is a member of the Unión de Rugby de Tucumán, which in turn belongs to the Unión Argentina de Rugby and plays in the First Division of the Northwest Regional Tournament.

The field hockey section of the club is affiliated to the Asociación Tucumana Amateur de Hockey (ATAH).

== History ==
The club was founded by students and professors from the Faculty of Exact Sciences and Technology of the Universidad Nacional de Tucumán on September 21, 1943.

Conceived as a "universal" multidisciplinary club, it had its first headquarters in Ayacucho and Combate de Las Piedras Street in Barrio Sur, San Miguel de Tucumán. It included among other disciplines athletics, chess, basketball and football.

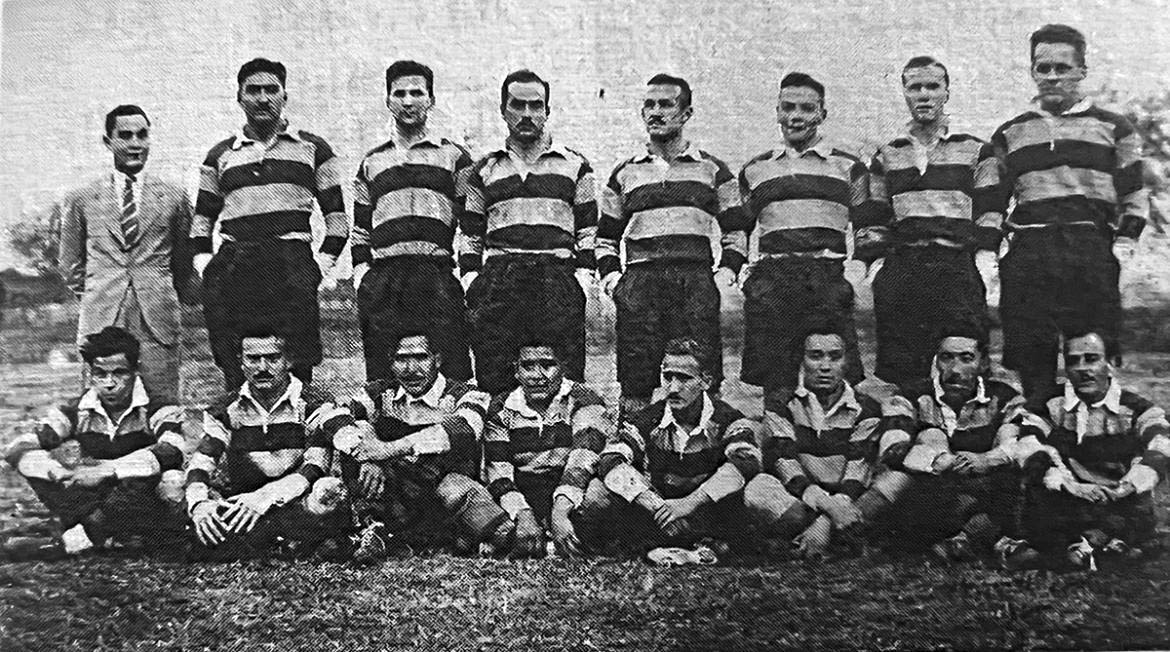
Rugby team of Universitario in 1945

The first Tucumán championship in 1944 was played between the four clubs called "Founders", since they were the first in the province: Natación y Gimnasia, Tucumán Rugby, Cardenales and Uni. This championship was played mostly on the Faculty of Physical Education's pitch and on Natacion y Gimnasia's pitch. Universitario played their matches in these pitches near the Parque 9 de Julio until 1958 when the government donated for a short term a field inside the Park.

In the year 1964, on the eve of the celebrations of the Bicentennial of the Battle of Tucumán, the club must return the land and settle in the university school of Physical Education (current headquarters of the Faculty of Physical Education or "FACDEF")

In 1967, Uni bought the property on 4460th Lavalle Street in the Ojo de Agua area (since 1977, Barrio San Martín), but it continued to dispute the matches in the Park.

In 1976 the club must move permanently to the headquarters of Ojo de Agua due to the military coup that meant the closure of all the Faculties. On April 22, 1976, Universitario would debut with a 17–0 victory against Cardenales in its current headquarters.

It is the maximum winner of the Torneo del Noroeste ("Northwest Regional Tournament") with 24. It was runner-up of the Torneo del Interior in 2002 and 2009.

== Titles ==
Universitario RC since its foundation won 17 Tucumán championships (from 1944 to 1999) and 7 Northwest Tournament (from its establishment in 1999 to the present):

- Torneo del Noroeste (24): 1946, 1951, 1958, 1959, 1960, 1963, 1965, 1967, 1968, 1970, 1971, 1972, 1973, 1974, 1976, 1997, 1998, 2002, 2005, 2007, 2009, 2010, 2016, 2019
