= Tucumán Rugby Club =

Argentinian sports club (mainly rugby union), based in Yerba Buena, Tucumán

(Argentina) Tucumán
- Full name: Tucumán Rugby Club
- Union: Unión de Rugby de Tucumán
- Nickname: Verdinegro
- Founded: 5 September 1942; 83 years ago
- Location: Yerba Buena, Argentina
- President: Miguel Barrera
- League: Torneo del Noroeste
- 2011: 5th
Team kit

Official website
- tucumanrugby.com

Tucumán Rugby Club (TRC) is an Argentine sports club based in the city of Yerba Buena in Tucumán Province. Although other sports (such as tennis and field hockey) are practised in the institution, Tucumán is mostly known for its rugby union team.

Tucumán rugby team is a member of the Unión de Rugby de Tucumán and one of the most successful teams in the province, having won the provincial title 20 times and reaching the final of the Nacional de Clubes on two occasions.

== History ==
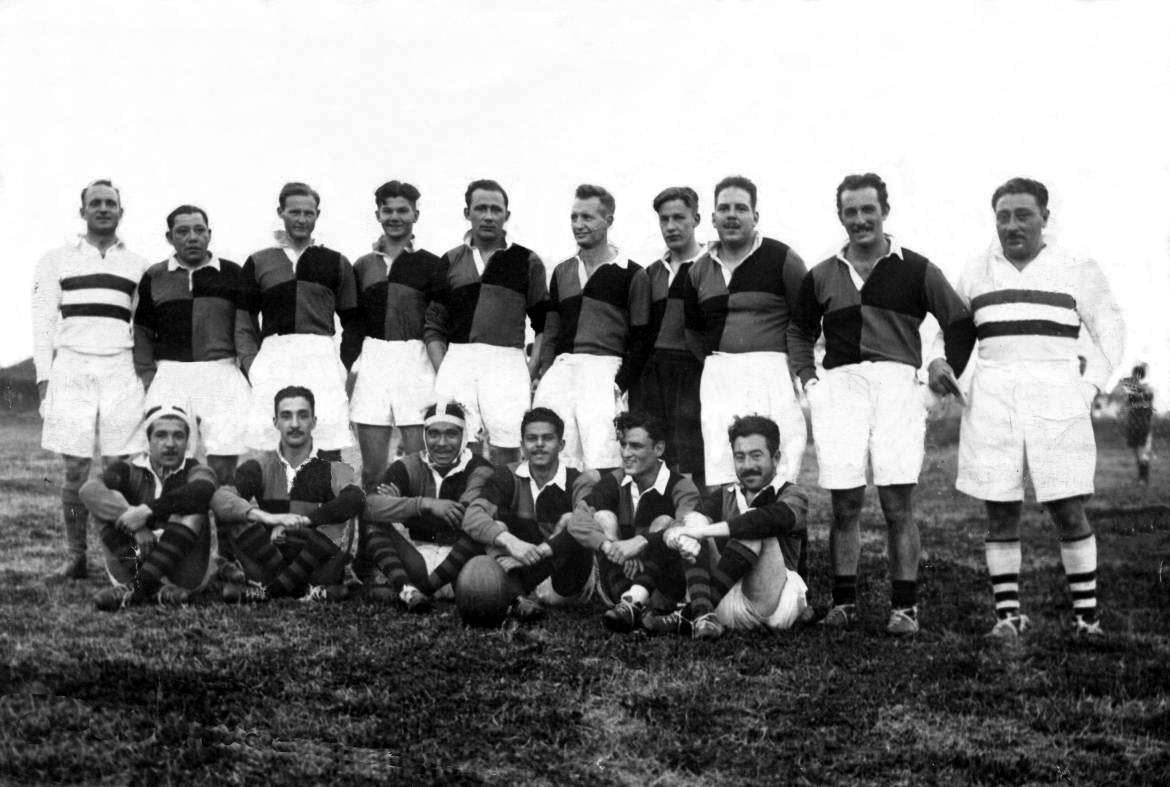
A TCR team in the 1940s

Tucumán Rugby Club was founded on September 5, 1942, by students and employees of the Bank of London branch in San Miguel de Tucumán. At first, most members were English expatriates and the club became known as "El Club de los Ingleses" (The Club of the English).

For the first few years the club didn't own a ground and had to play rugby in public parks. By the end of the 1950s the club purchased a 3 hectares plot of land in Salas y Valdez and started building its own installations.

Tucumán won the first ever Torneo del Noroeste title in 1944, the first of Tucumán Rugby Club's 20 provincial titles. At the national level the club reached the final of the Nacional de Clubes twice.

Many Tucumán players went on to represent Argentina at international level, the first of which was Julio Bach in 1966. Tucumán's main rival is Universitario de Tucumán.

=== Titles ===
- Torneo del Noroeste: 20

1944, 1945, 1948, 1951, 1952, 1953, 1956, 1961, 1962, 1977, 1978, 1988, 1989, 1990, 1991, 1992, 1993, 1995, 2000, 2006
