= Unión Cordobesa de Rugby =

Rugby union governing body in Córdoba Province, Argentina

- Sport: Rugby union
- Jurisdiction: Córdoba Province
- Abbreviation: UCR
- Founded: 1931; 94 years ago
- Affiliation: UAR
- Headquarters: Córdoba City
- President: Félix Páez Molina
- Vice president: Gabriel Domínguez
- Secretary: Eduardo Giaimo

Official website
- www.unioncordobesaderugby.com.ar/es/
- (Argentina)

The Córdoba Rugby Union (Spanish: Unión Cordobesa de Rugby) (also known for its initials UCR) is the organisational body that rules the game of rugby union in Córdoba province of Argentina. Estadio Mario Alberto Kempes, with a capacity of 57,000, is used for rugby matches.

== History ==
The union was founded in order to encourage the practice of rugby union in Córdoba. Founding members were Universitario, Gimnasia y Esgrima, Córdoba Rugby, Curupaytí y San Vicente (Fomento Sport Club by then), officially establishing the body on April 17, 1931. Captain Montes was named as president.

Gimnasia y Esgrima de Buenos Aires and Curupaytí played the first inter-provincial match, on May 24, 1931. The first local championship would be held one month later, being Curupaytí the first champion after beating San Vicente in the final. Nevertheless, the first official tournament started in October 1931, with Universitario defeating Curupaytí at the final game.

In recent years the union has become the fastest growing provincial union in the country, going from 19 clubs in the 1980s to around 40 clubs twenty years later.

In 2023, a new franchise was established to compete in Super Rugby Americas. The team, named "Dogos XV", is controlled by Unión Cordobesa.

== Clubs ==
Clubs affiliated to UCR as of June, 2021:

- Córdoba Athletic
- Córdoba RC
- Jockey Club Córdoba
- Jockey Club de Villa María
- La Tablada
- Palermo Bajo
- San Martín Rugby Club
- Tala
- Urú Curé
- Universitario

== Competitions ==
Clubs from the province play in the Torneo de Córdoba. This provincial competition is divided into 2 main divisions: Zona Superior and Zona Ascenso.

The Superior division includes 12 clubs competing for the provincial title.

== Provincial team ==
"Los Dogos" kit

The Unión Cordobesa de Rugby was represented in the Campeonato Argentino, a former national competition in which each of the 24 unions that made up the Argentine Rugby Union (UAR) participated.

Córdoba's provincial team -nicknamed Los Dogos (The Mastiffs)-, won the Campeonato Argentino 7 times, the last in 2012.

=== Titles ===
- Campeonato Argentino (7): 1995, 1996, 1997, 2001, 2009, 2011, 2012
