= Córdoba Athletic Club =

Argentine sports club

(Argentina) Córdoba A.C.
- Full name: Córdoba Athletic Club
- Union: UCR
- Nickname: Rojinegro
- Founded: 17 April 1882; 143 years ago
- Location: Córdoba, Argentina
- Ground: Tudor
- President: José Fernandez
- Coach: Guillermo Taleb
- League: Top 10 Córdoba
- 2025: ?
Team kit

Official website
- cordobaathletic.club

Córdoba Athletic Club is an Argentine sports club in the city of Córdoba. Founded in 1882, Córdoba Athletic is the oldest sports club in Córdoba Province. The institution is mostly known for its rugby union team, which plays in the Top 10, the main tournament organised by Unión Cordobesa de Rugby.

The rugby team is one of the most successful in the province, having won the Torneo 18 times, the last in 2024.

In field hockey, the club is affiliated to amateur Córdoba Field Hockey Federation, where its teams compete.

Other sports practiced at the club include tennis.

== History ==
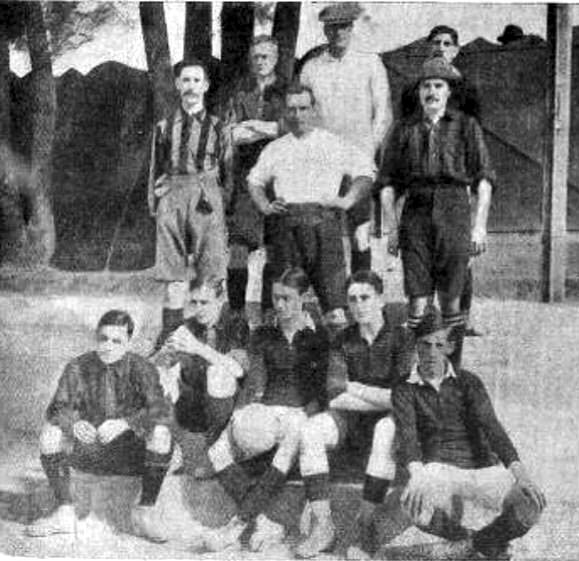
Football team of Córdoba A.C. in 1911

Like many Argentine sports and social clubs at the time, Córdoba Athletic Club was founded by English rail workers. The exact date of the club's creation is unknown but is thought to be either 17 April or 15 November 1882. Other sources state that the club could have been established in 1867.

For its first few years in existence the club would be dominated by British expatriates and the official language at the club would be English. Originally, the club was founded as an athletics club. Rugby would only appear at CAC in 1898. For a time the club also played football, until it became professional in Argentina in 1931, being abandoned by the club.

As the only club in the province for a long time, CAC had to travel down to Rosario for competition. There, CAC would often compete with that city's oldest club Atlético del Rosario. The ties between both clubs remain strong today.

== Titles ==
- Torneo de Córdoba (18): 1952, 1955, 1962, 1967, 1968, 1969, 1970, 1973, 1974, 1982, 1992, 1996, 2005, 2008, 2010, 2011, 2023, 2024
