= Torneo del Noroeste =

Torneo del Noroeste – Súper 10
- Organiser(s): Tucumán; Sgo. del Estero; Salta; Jujuy
- Founded: 1944; 82 years ago
- Region: Tucumán; Jujuy; Salta; Sgo. del Estero
- Teams: 10
- Qualifier for: Nacional de Clubes; Torneo del Interior
- Related competitions: Torneo del Oeste
- Current champions: Tucumán Rugby (2025)
- Most championships: Universitario (T) (24 titles)

The Torneo Regional del NOA (NorOeste Argentino – Argentine North-West), also known as Torneo del Noroeste, is a regional rugby union competition in Argentina.

Originally, only clubs from the Tucumán Rugby Union took part. In successive editions the competition added clubs from the unions of Jujuy, Salta, and Sgo. del Estero provinces. This yearly tournament has traditionally been dominated by Tucumán clubs. Clubs from the other 3 provinces have yet to win a title.

Universitario is the most successful team, with 24 titles won to date.

== History ==
Rugby was first played in Tucumán in 1915 but the first official rugby team in the province –Club Natación y Gimnasia– would only be formed in 1936. Six years later Tucumán Rugby Club was founded, followed by Universitario Rugby Club in 1943 and Cardenales Rugby Club in 1944.

Those four clubs would go on to found the "Unión de Rugby del Norte" on 29 February 1944.

Although the URN was based in Tucumán Province it also dealt with fledgling clubs from the neighbouring provinces of Salta, Jujuy and Santiago del Estero. Later these provinces would go on to form their own unions in 1951, 1966 and 1968 respectively.

Although all four provinces take part in the regional Torneo del Noroeste, they still organise their own local competitions.

== Format ==
As of 2022, 10 clubs from all 4 provinces took part in the tournament. The competition is divided into two zones. The four best placed teams qualify to "Zona Campeonato" to crown the champion of the season. The tournament uses a promotion and relegation system.

Champion and runner-up of Torneo del Noroeste qualify for the Nacional de Clubes, the main club competition of Argentina while the other best placed teams qualify for Torneo del Interior, the national club competition outside Buenos Aires.

== Championships ==
=== Results ===
Ed.	Year	Champion(s)
1	1944	Tucumán RC (1)
2	1945	Tucumán RC (2)
3	1946	Universitario (1)
4	1947	Natación y Gimnasia (1)
5	1948	Tucumán RC (3)
6	1949	Natación y Gimnasia (2)
–	1950	(not held)
7	1951	Uni Tucumán (2) & Tucumán Rugby (4)
8	1952	Tucumán RC (5)
9	1953	Tucumán RC (6)
10	1954	Cardenales (1)
11	1955	Natación y Gimnasia (3)
12	1956	Tucumán RC (7)
13	1957	Natación y Gimnasia (4)
14	1958	Universitario (3)
15	1959	Universitario (4)
16	1960	Universitario (5)
17	1961	Natación y Gimnasia (5) & Tucumán RC (8)
18	1962	Tucumán Rugby (9)
19	1963	Universitario (6)
20	1964	Cardenales (2)
21	1965	Universitario (7)
22	1966	Los Tarcos (1)
23	1967	Universitario (8) & Los Tarcos (2)
24	1968	Universitario (9)
25	1969	Los Tarcos (3)
26	1970	Universitario (10)
27	1971	Universitario (11)
28	1972	Universitario (12)
29	1973	Universitario (13) & Tucumán LT (1)
30	1974	Universitario (14)
31	1975	Los Tarcos (4)
32	1976	Universitario (15) & Los Tarcos (5)
33	1977	Tucumán LT (2) & Tucumán RC (10)
34	1978	Tucumán RC (11)
35	1979	Tucumán LT (3)
36	1980	Tucumán LT (4)
37	1981	Tucumán LT (5)
38	1982	Tucumán LT (6)
39	1983	Los Tarcos (6)
40	1984	Los Tarcos (7)
41	1985	Los Tarcos (8)
42	1986	Los Tarcos (9)
43	1987	Los Tarcos (10)
44	1988	Tucumán RC (12)
45	1989	Tucumán RC (13)
46	1990	Tucumán RC (14)
47	1991	Tucumán RC (15)
48	1992	Tucumán RC (16)
49	1993	Tucumán RC (17)
50	1994	Los Tarcos (11)
51	1995	Natación y Gimnasia (6) & Tucumán RC (18)
52	1996	Natación y Gimnasia (7)
53	1997	Universitario (16)
54	1998	Universitario (17)
55	1999	Huirapuca (1)
56	2000	Tucumán RC (19)
57	2001	Huirapuca (2)
58	2002	Uni Tucumán (18) & Cardenales (3)
59	2003	Huirapuca (3)
60	2004	Los Tarcos (12)
61	2005	Universitario (19)
62	2006	Tucumán RC (20)
63	2007	Universitario (20)
64	2008	Tucumán LT (7)
65	2009	Tucumán LT (8) & Universitario (21)
66	2010	Universitario (22)
67	2011	Tucumán LT (9)
68	2012	Tucumán LT (10)
69	2013	Cardenales (4) & Huirapuca (4)
70	2014	Tucumán LT (11)
71	2015	Tucumán RC (21)
72	2016	Universitario (23) & Los Tarcos (13)
73	2017	Natación y Gimnasia (8)
74	2018	Los Tarcos (14)
75	2019	Universitario (24)
–	2020	(not held due to COVID-19 pandemic)
76	2021	Tucumán RC (22)
77	2022	Huirapuca (5)
78	2023	Old Lions (1)
79	2024	Tucumán LT (12)
80	2025	Tucumán RC (23)

=== Titles by team ===
Team	Titles	Years won
Universitario	24	1946, 1951, 1958, 1959, 1960, 1963, 1965, 1967, 1968, 1970, 1971, 1972, 1973, 1974, 1976, 1997, 1998, 2002, 2005, 2007, 2009, 2010, 2016, 2019
Tucumán RC	23	1944, 1945, 1948, 1951, 1952, 1953, 1956, 1961, 1962, 1977, 1978, 1988, 1989, 1990, 1991, 1992, 1993, 1995, 2000, 2006, 2015, 2021, 2024
Los Tarcos	14	1966, 1967, 1969, 1975, 1976, 1983, 1984, 1985, 1986, 1987, 1994, 2004, 2016, 2018
Tucumán LT	12	1973, 1977, 1979, 1980, 1981, 1982, 2008, 2009, 2011, 2012, 2014, 2024
Natación y Gimnasia	8	1947, 1949, 1955, 1957, 1961, 1995, 1996, 2017
Huirapuca	5	1999, 2001, 2003, 2013, 2022
Cardenales	4	1954, 1964, 2002, 2013
Old Lions	1	2023
