= 2026 URBA Top 14 final =

- Event: 2026 URBA Top 14 final
Newman	Hindú
33	32
- Date: 7 Nov 2026
- Venue: Estadio del CASI, San Isidro, Argentina
- Referee: Pablo Deluca

The 2026 URBA Top 14 final was the final of the 2026 URBA Top 14, the 127th. edition of Torneo de la URBA, the regional rugby union competition organised by Unión de Rugby de Buenos Aires (URBA). It is the oldest rugby competition in South America and one of the oldest club competitions in the world.

The match was played on November 7, 2026, being contested by Newman and Hindú and held in Estadio del CASI in San Isidro. Since the URBA implemented the playoffs system in 1998, it will be the 3rd. final contested by Newman while Hindú will play their 13th. final, having won 10 of them.

It was the second time both clubs meet in a final after the 2008 edition when Hindú was the winner.

Newman defeated Hindú 33–32 to claim their second URBA title.

== Background ==
Hindú played their 13th. final, being the team with more finals contested since the URBA implemented this system in 1998. Besides, Hindú is the team with most finals won (10 out of 13).

On the other hand, Newman, established in 1975 by alumni of Cardinal Newman College, played their 2nd. URBA final after 2008 when they lost to Hindú, which was the predominant force in Argentine rugby in those times.

== Qualified teams ==
Team	Previous final app.
Newman	2008, **2025**
Hindú	**1998**, **2006**, **2007**, **2008**, **2009**, **2012**, 2013, **2014**, **2015**, 2016, **2017**, **2022**

Note

- **Bold** indicates winning years

== Venue ==
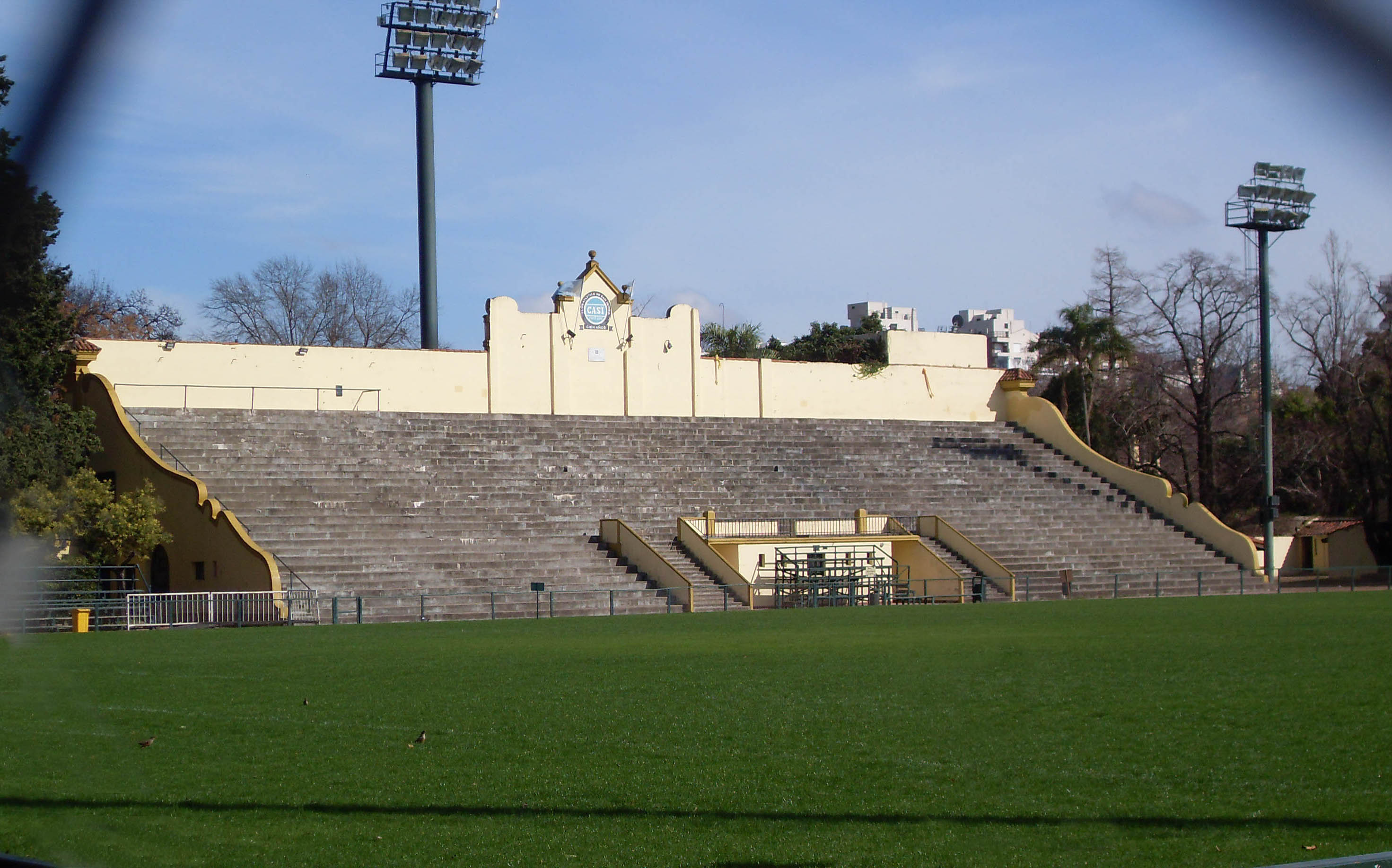
La Catedral, venue for the final

The final was held in La Catedral ("the Cathedral of rugby"), nickname of Estadio del CASI, earned due to it is distant 500 mts from the San Isidro Cathedral, a historic landmark since 1963. which has been the venue of URBA finals since 2008. The stadium, with capacity for 4,500 spectactors, is one of the oldest in Argentina so the club has always been on the same site since 1902, when Manuel Aguirre, owner of a large chacra on Sánez Peña street, gave the club a portion to settle down there.

The stadium is located in downtown San Isidro, has a lighting system for night matches and a concrete grandstand inaugurated in the 1920s. When San Isidro competed in football tournament organised by AFA, the stadium was also used for that sport.

== Road to the final ==
After the regular season, four teams qualified to the semifinals in order to decide the two clubs that played the final.

Newman		Round	Hindú	
Opponent	Result	Stage	Opponent	Result
Buenos Aires	31–3 (H)	Matchday 1	Los Tilos	52–18 (H)
Belgrano A.C.	33–25 (A)	Matchday 2	CASI	15–12 (A)
CUBA	43–36 (H)	Matchday 3	SIC	10–37 (H)
Los Matreros	52–28 (H)	Matchday 4	Buenos Aires C&RC	34–12 (H)
Alumni	32–30 (A)	Matchday 5	Belgrano A.C.	39–22 (H)
Champagnat	47–8 (H)	Matchday 6	SIC	32–31 (A)
Hindú	26–26 (A)	Matchday 7	Newman	26–25 (H)
La Plata	16–15 (H)	Matchday 8	Alumni	23–17 (A)
Regatas BV	36–21 (A)	Matchday 9	Champagnat	62–26 (A)
Atlético del Rosario	54–29 (H)	Matchday 10	Los Matreros	59–22 (H)
Los Tilos	41–11 (A)	Matchday 11	La Plata	39–28 (A)
CASI	37–28 (H)	Matchday 12	Regatas BV	20–23 (H)
CUBA	31–25 (A)	Matchday 13	Atlético del Rosario	30–32 (A)
Buenos Aires C&RC	36–23 (A)	Matchday 14	Los Tilos	32–40 (A)
Belgrano A.C.	31–17 (H)	Matchday 15	CASI	8–29 (H)
SIC	26–25 (A)	Matchday 16	CUBA	26–16 (A)
Los Matreros	69–3 (A)	Matchday 17	Buenos Aires C&RC	32–21 (A)
Alumni	29–19 (H)	Matchday 18	Belgrano A.C.	13–36 (A)
Champagnat	41–21 (A)	Matchday 19	SIC	24–18 (A)
Hindú	40–20 (H)	Matchday 20	Newman	20–40 (A)
La Plata	34–19 (A)	Matchday 21	Alumni	43–37 (H)
Regatas BV	40–17 (H)	Matchday 22	Champagnat	43–33 (A)
Atlético del Rosario	45–41 (A)	Matchday 23	Los Matreros	66–48 (A)
Los Tilos	43–25 (H)	Matchday 24	La Plata	63–12 (H)
CASI	37–27 (A)	Matchday 25	Regatas BV	40–10 (A)
CUBA	21–21 (H)	Matchday 26	Atlético del Rosario	68–33 (H)
Pos. / Team / Pts. / P / W / T / L / PS / PC / PD / Qualification; 1 / Newman / 110 / 26 / 24 / 1 / 1 / 938 / 563 / 375 / Semifinals; 2 / CASI / 90 / 26 / 20 / 0 / 6 / 868 / 620 / 248 / Semifinals; 3 / Hindú / 89 / 26 / 19 / 0 / 7 / 951 / 678 / 273 / Semifinals; 4 / Alumni / 86 / 26 / 17 / 0 / 9 / 946 / 608 / 338 / Semifinals
Newman		Round	Hindú	
Opponent	Result	Stage	Opponent	Result
Alumni	25–20 (N)	Semifinals	CASI	16–12 (N)

== Match ==
=== Summary ===
The match began with the intensity and closely-matched play typical of a final. Gonzalo Gutiérrez Taboada opened the scoring with a penalty, but Hindú had shown more promise in their attacking forays and were rewarded with a try from Nicolás Amaya. However, a yellow card for Martín Cancelliere in the 19th minute shifted the momentum: Newman took advantage of having an extra man, began to dominate, and scored two tries—courtesy of Pablo Cardinal and Santiago Marolda, the latter following an excellent piece of play.

Simón Prince’s knee injury dealt a blow to El Cardenal [Newman], who also saw Lucas Marguery receive a yellow card. Hindú capitalized on this, reaching halftime trailing by just three points following a try by Sebastián Cancelliere—the score stood at 20–17.

The second half began as an uphill battle for Newman. After another penalty kick by Gutiérrez Taboada, the fly-half was shown a yellow card for an infringement against Bautista Farisé as the Hindú back was grounding the ball. The play resulted in a penalty try, and shortly thereafter, Martín Cancelliere scored, putting El Elefante [Hindú] ahead 32–26.

In the 23rd minute, Marolda struck again with a try —converted by Gutiérrez Taboada— to reclaim the lead. The final minutes were incredibly tense, with Hindú pushing for the decisive play to secure the title —including a kick by Farisé that hit the upright— while Newman held firm against every advance. The 33–32 scoreline remained unchanged, and following a final defensive play by Justo Ortíz Basualdo that will go down in history, Newman sparked celebrations in a final decided by a single point.

=== Details ===
7 Nov 2026
17:10

**Newman**	**33–32**	**Hindú**
Try: Cardinal 25'; Marolda 27', 63'; Con: Gutiérrez Taboada 25', 27', 63'; Pen: Gutiérrez Taboada 6', 35', 43'; Marolda 10'	Report	Try: Amaya 11'; Cancelliere 39', 56' try penal 46'; Con: Farisé 11', 39'; Pen: Farisé 33', 52'

Estadio del CASI, San Isidro
Referee: Pablo Deluca

**Newman**
**Hindú**

FB	15	Juan B. Daireaux
RW	14	Santiago Marolda
OC	13	Simón Prince
IC	12	Benjamín Lanfranco
LW	11	Jerónimo Ulloa
FH	10	Gonzalo Gutiérrez Taboada	(yellow card) 5'
SH	9	Lucas Marguery
N8	8	Rodrigo Díaz de Vivar
OF	7	Pablo Cardinal
BF	6	Faustino Santarelli
RL	5	Alejandro Urtubey
LL	4	Francisco Lascombes
TP	3	Bautista Bosch
HK	2	Beltrán Salese
LP	1	Miguel Prince
Substitutions:
	16	Fermín Perkins
	17	Isidro Bosch
	18	Manuel Lozano
	19	Jerónimo Ureta
	20	Bautista Bonasso
	21	Lucas Nava
	22	Florencio Llerena
	23	Justo Ortiz Basualdo
Head coach:
(Argentina) Santiago Piccaluga

FB	15	Pascal Senillosa
RW	14	Sebastián Cancelliere
OC	13	Santino Trivellini
IC	12	Bautista Farisé
LW	11	Martín Cancelliere
FH	10	Ramón Fernández Miranda
SH	9	Felipe Ezcurra (c)
N8	8	Nicolás Amaya
OF	7	Lautaro Bávaro
BF	6	Santino Amaya
RL	5	Elías Banach
LL	4	Carlos Repetto
TP	3	Nicolás Leiva
HK	2	Agustín Capurro
LP	1	Franco Diviesti
Substitutions:
	16	Facundo Gattas
	17	Juan Martínez Sosa
	18	Ramiro Herrera
	19	Juan Comolli
	20	Tomás Scallan
	21	Lucas Fernández Miranda
	22	Lisandro Rodríguez
	23	Tomás Amher
Head coach:
(Argentina) Santiago Fernández

== Aftermath ==
The final was described as "one of the best finals in the history of URBA championships", noting that the match was "hard-fought, electrifying, ever-changing, and moving due to the total commitment shown by both teams. According to the local media, the match was "played at a pace comparable to an international-level encounter"
