= 2024 URBA Top 12 =

- Countries: Argentina
- Number of teams: 12
- Champions: Alumni (7th. title)
- Runners-up: Belgrano A.C.
- Relegated: Champagnat; Atlético del Rosario
- Matches played: 135
- Top point scorer: Juan Landó (Belgrano) (322)
- Top try scorer: Juan Landó (Belgrano) (5)

The 2024 URBA Top 12 (officially Top 12 Copa Macro for sponsorship reasons) was the 125th. edition of Top 12, a rugby union club competition held in Argentina organised by the Unión de Rugby de Buenos Aires (URBA). The tournament was contested by twelve teams, ten from the Buenos Aires Province, one from the autonomous city of Buenos Aires, and one from Rosario. It ran from 6 April to 26 October 2024.

Promoted clubs from the 2023 URBA Second division (Primera A) were Regatas Bella Vista and Champagnat which replaced Pucará and La Plata that had been relegated in the previous season.

Alumni won their 7th. league championship after defeating SIC 20–17 in the final. On the other hand, Atlético del Rosario and Champagnat were relegated to Primera A (the second division), when in round 20th, both teams lost their matches, the Rosarian side v Regatas while the Marista was defeated by CASI.

Belgrano A.C. fullback Juan Landó was the top scorer of the season, with 322 points.

== Format ==
The 12 participant clubs played each other in a double round-robin tournament. The four best placed teams at the end of the regular season qualified for the semifinals in order to decide which teams would play the final. The two clubs placed in the last positions (11th. and 12th.) were relegated to "Primera A".

== Teams ==
Teams competing at Top 12 were:

Club	Location	Stadium
Alumni	Manuel Alberti (Note: Town in Pilar Partido.)	Estadio de Alumni
Atlético del Rosario	Rosario	Plaza Jewell
Belgrano A.C.	Buenos Aires	Virrey del Pino
Buenos Aires C&RC	Victoria	Estadio del BACRC
C.A. San Isidro	San Isidro	La Catedral
Champagnat	Pilar	Estancias del Pilar
CUBA	Villa de Mayo	Estadio del CUBA
Hindú	Don Torcuato	Estadio de Hindú
Newman	Benavídez	Brother Timothy O'Brien
Regatas	Bella Vista	Estadio de Regatas
San Isidro Club	Boulogne	La Zanja
San Luis	Tolosa	La Cumbre

== Matches ==
Home \ Away	ALU	ARO	BAC	BUE	CAS	CHA	CUB	HIN	NEW	REG	SLU	SIC
Alumni		37–8	9–22	42–16	37–25	37–30	39–24	24–19	37–26	32–10	19–16	13–20
Atlético del Rosario	26–51		35–31	24–33	34–59	18–18	17–38	27–31	21–56	27–27	34–24	32–49
Belgrano A.C.	25–23	69–22		31–27	14–12	47–25	30–22	42–29	9–23	22–12	40–22	24–32
Buenos Aires	17–27	12–27	22–21		24–53	33–23	34–15	26–17	29–30	20–17	32–27	20–20
CASI	55–20	37–17	37–41	30–27		75–33	27–3	44–8	21–24	41–18	44–21	39–29
Champagnat	18–25	36–20	18–49	13–20	23–28		32–47	33–35	27–22	25–32	19–20	6–39
CUBA	44–26	50–29	41–42	30–10	11–11	52–13		27–28	21–23	28–23	10–15	12–26
Hindú	19–43	34–27	26–23	38–11	26–18	19–19	17–14		22–40	21–19	17–23	12–44
Newman	30–19	45–17	26–56	45–19	37–14	39–20	34–27	40–7		33–37	59–15	12–35
Regatas BV	13–18	20–10	13–24	27–20	30–24	19–9	35–27	20–35	18–35		28–17	12–16
San Luis	29–26	31–11	17–22	35–21	17–37	9–13	17–19	3–55	16–20	27–20		6–19
SIC	44–47	26–10	50–39	27–34	16–13	28–16	38–31	23–21	34–24	38–17	20–11	

Source: URBA
Legend: Blue = home team win; Yellow = draw; Red = away team win.

== Table ==
Pos.	Team	Pts.	P	W	T	L	Ps	Pc	Pd	Bp	Qualification
1	Newman	77	22	17	0	5	749	501	248	9	Semifinals
2	San Isidro Club	75	22	17	1	4	661	459	202	5	Semifinals
3	Alumni	73	22	16	0	6	627	502	125	9	Semifinals
4	Belgrano A.C.	71	22	15	0	7	720	539	181	11	Semifinals
5	C.A. San Isidro	68	22	13	1	8	740	521	219	14	
6	Hindú	47	22	10	1	11	493	604	-111	5	
7	San Luis	47	22	10	0	12	487	572	-85	7	
8	CUBA	46	22	8	1	13	602	572	30	12	
9	Buenos Aires C&RC	41	22	8	1	13	496	615	-119	7	
10	Regatas	41	22	8	1	13	457	519	-62	7	
11	Champagnat	21	22	2	2	18	466	748	-282	9	Relegated
12	Atlético del Rosario	19	22	3	2	17	498	844	-346	3	Relegated

=== Semifinals ===
Top 12 – Semifinals; 19 and 20 Oct
4	Belgrano A.C.	28
1	Newman	27
3	Alumni	30
2	SIC	21

Top 12 – Final; 26 Oct
Alumni	20
Belgrano A.C.	17

19 Oct	Belgrano A.C.	28–27	Newman	Estadio del CASI, San Isidro
	Try: Díaz 25'; Aparicio 37'; Arana 57'; Con: Landó 25', 37'; Pen: Landó 35', 44', 77'	Report	Try: Bosch 16'; Marolda 65'; Urieta 74'; Con: G. Taboada 16', 65'; Pen: G. Taboada 22', 49'	Referee: Pablo Deluca

20 Oct	Alumni	30–21	SIC	Estadio del CASI, San Isidro
	Try: D. Luzzi 35'; Battezzati 65'; Pernas 66'; Con: D. Luzzi 35'; G. Iglesias 65', 66'; Pen: D. Luzzi 11', 16', 25'	Report	Try: Bottazzini 47'; Daireaux 75'; Albanese 80'; Con: Pavlovsky 47', 75'; Albanese 80'	Referee: Tomás Bertazza

=== Final ===
26 Oct 2024	Alumni	20–17 (a.e.t.)	Belgrano	Estadio del CASI, San Isidro
	Try: Fuentes 69'; Con: 47', Díaz Luzzi 69'; Pen: Díaz Luzzi 30'; Drop: Díaz Luzzi 86'	Report	Try: Vaccarino 27', Moro 42'; Con: Landó 27', 42'; Pen: Landó 4'	Attendance: 4,500; Referee: Pablo Deluca
