= 2025 URBA Top 12 =

- Countries: Argentina
- Number of teams: 12
- Champions: Newman (1st. title)
- Runners-up: SIC
- Relegated: San Luis (via playoffs)
- Matches played: 135
- Top point scorer: Juan Akemeier (CASI); Juan Landó (Belgrano) (31 each)
- Top try scorer: Ignacio Díaz (Belgrano) (18)

The 2025 URBA Top 12 (officially, URBA Top 12 Copa Macro for sponsorship reasons) was the 126th. edition of Top 12, a rugby union club competition held in Argentina organised by the Unión de Rugby de Buenos Aires (URBA). The tournament was contested by twelve teams, eleven from the Buenos Aires Province and one from the autonomous city of Buenos Aires. It ran from 5 April to 1 November 2025.

Promoted clubs from the 2024 URBA Second division (Primera A) were La Plata and Los Tilos which replaced Champagnat and Atlético del Rosario that had been relegated in the previous season.

Newman won their first league championship after defeating SIC 15–3 in the final. On the other hand, San Luis was relegated to Primera A (the second division) via playoffs.

== Format ==
The 12 clubs played each other in a double round-robin tournament. As this was the last URBA edition with 12 teams so since 2026 it would be expanded to 14 teams, none of the participants were directly relegated. Instead, the last placed team played a promotion and relegation match ("Permanencia") to decide which team would remain in the division or would be relegated to the second level.

== Teams ==
Teams competing at Top 12 were:

Club	Location	Stadium
Alumni	Manuel Alberti (Note: Town in Pilar Partido.)	Estadio de Alumni
Belgrano A.C.	Buenos Aires	Virrey del Pino
Buenos Aires C&RC	Victoria	Estadio del BACRC
C.A. San Isidro	San Isidro	La Catedral
CUBA	Villa de Mayo	Estadio del CUBA
Hindú	Don Torcuato	Estadio de Hindú
La Plata	Manuel Gonnet	Estadio de La Plata RC
Los Tilos	Tolosa	Estadio de Los Tilos
Los Matreros	Morón	Estadio de Los Matreros
Newman	Benavídez	Brother Timothy O'Brien
Regatas	Bella Vista	Estadio de Regatas
San Isidro Club	Boulogne	La Zanja
San Luis	Tolosa	La Cumbre

== Matches ==
Home \ Away	ALU	BAC	BUE	CAS	CUB	HIN	LAP	NEW	REG	SLU	SIC	TIL
Alumni		19–35	34–29	22–29	34–26	24–23	50–19	22–30	9–12	39–29	24–48	35–40
Belgrano A.C.	35–17		41–32	27–18	24–20	43–27	38–33	41–21	35–29	52–17	43–31	31–32
Buenos Aires	13–33	39–14		20–35	23–26	17–25	13–12	10–32	16–15	26–18	23–35	25–39
CASI	31–20	23–20	55–15		30–26	26–25	51–11	26–16	47–23	25–24	33–29	25–21
CUBA	22–14	31–41	42–23	9–34		10–6	27–23	36–39	33–9	50–40	34–38	25–26
Hindú	31–35	26–35	31–13	46–7	27–3		24–20	20–14	28–26	48–13	28–32	10–24
La Plata	15–21	28–44	20–17	15–44	28–33	36–29		17–21	16–13	15–8	24–19	22–30
Newman	24–14	35–25	18–13	22–8	21–20	34–17	41–12		26–27	29–26	45–21	21–23
Regatas BV	16–15	21–29	27–20	23–27	25–22	21–29	49–20	24–26		37–14	15–19	20–13
San Luis	29–26	17–22	35–21	17–37	17–19	3–55	31–11	16–20	27–20		6–19	9–13
SIC	44–47	50–39	27–34	16–13	38–31	23–21	26–10	34–24	38–17	20–11		28–16
Los Tilos	16–20	14–42	37–30	18–19	35–34	45–12	16–9	17–24	37–39	21–21	27–23	

Source: URBA
Legend: Blue = home team win; Yellow = draw; Red = away team win.

== Table ==
Pos.	Team	Pts.	P	W	T	L	Ps	Pc	Pd	Qualification
1	C.A. San Isidro	80	22	18	0	4	643	465	178	Semifinals
2	Belgrano A.C.	76	22	17	0	5	756	580	176	Semifinals
3	Newman	71	22	16	0	6	583	469	114	Semifinals
4	San Isidro Club	70	22	15	0	7	658	565	93	Semifinals
5	Los Tilos	63	22	13	1	8	560	524	36	
6	Regatas	50	22	10	0	12	518	538	-20	
7	Alumni	49	22	10	0	12	574	596	-22	
8	Hindú	48	22	9	0	13	580	514	66	
9	CUBA	48	22	9	0	13	579	595	-16	
10	La Plata	28	22	5	0	17	416	645	-229	
11	Buenos Aires C&RC	27	22	5	0	17	472	651	-179	
12	San Luis	25	22	4	1	17	428	625	-197	Permanencia

=== Semifinals ===
Top 12 – Semifinals; 24 Oct
3	Newman	41
2	Belgrano A.C.	24
1	CASI	9
4	SIC	13

Top 12 – Final; 1 Nov
Newman	15
SIC	3

24 Oct	Newman	41–24	Belgrano A.C.	Estadio del CASI, San Isidro
	Try: Ulloa 29', Lanfranco 39', Marguery 49', Maroldo 53', Brandi 59', de Vivar 73'; Con: Landó 37', G. Taboada 39'; Pen: G. Taboada 17', 42'; Drop: G. Taboada 5'	Report	Try: Díaz 13', Mihura 37'; Con: Landó 37'; Pen: Landó 2', 7', 26', 46'	Referee: Mauro Rossi

25 Oct	CASI	9–13	SIC	Estadio del CASI, San Isidro
	Pen: Akemeier 7', 46', 57'	Report	Try: 22'; Pen: Pavlovsky 12', 22'	Referee: Pablo Deluca

=== Final ===
1 Nov 2025	Newman	15–3	SIC	Estadio del CASI, San Isidro
	Try: Brandi 39', Bosch 59'; Con: Gutiérrez Taboada 59'; Pen: Gutiérrez Taboada 34'	Report	Pen: Pavlovsky 21'	Attendance: 4,500; Referee: Tómas Bertazza

== Permanencia ==
The last team of Top 12 (San Luis) and the 3rd. to 5th. teams of Primera A (Champagnat, Pueyrredón, and San Cirano) played a single-elimination series in order to define which team would qualify to 2026 Top 14 and which would be relegated.

Champagnat defeat San Luis 18–16 in the final held in Manuel B. Gonnet therefore the team from Pilar promoted and will play the 2026 Top 14 while San Luis was relegated after 31 seasons in the top division. while Champagnat promoted to 2026 Top 14.

Permanencia – Semifinals; 25 Oct
12	San Luis	36
3	San Cirano	6
1	Champagnat	34
2	Pueyrredón	14

Permanencia – Final; 8 Nov
San Luis	16
Champagnat	18

25 Oct 2025	Champagnat	34–14	Pueyrredón	Estancias del Pilar, Pilar
		Report

25 Oct 2025	San Luis	36–6	San Cirano	La Cumbre, Tolosa
		Report

8 Nov 2025	San Luis	16–18	Champagnat	La Plata RC, Manuel Gonnet
	Try: Ruesta 34'; Con: Quattrochi 34'; Pen: Quattrochi 2', 11', Quattrochi 67'	Report	Try: Santos Penelo 17', 42' Magaró; Con: Rojo 17'; Pen: del Piano 80'; Drop: Santos Penelo x', 59'

Note

Champagnat qualified to 2026 URBA Top 14 while San Luis was relegated.
