= 2021 URBA Top 12 final =

Rugby union match in Argentina

- Event: 2021 URBA Top 12
CUBA	SIC
10	9
- Date: 11 Dec 2021
- Venue: Estadio del CASI, San Isidro, Argentina
- Referee: Pablo Deluca
- Attendance: 4,500

The 2021 URBA Top 12 final was the final of the 122nd. edition of Torneo de la URBA, the regional rugby union competition organised by Unión de Rugby de Buenos Aires (URBA). It is the oldest rugby competition in South America and one of the oldest club competitions in the world.

The match was contested by Club Universitario de Buenos Aires (CUBA) and San Isidro Club (SIC), and was held in Estadio del CASI in San Isidro. Since the URBA implemented the playoffs system in 1998, it was the 4th. final contested by CUBA (with one win in 2013 when defeated Hindú, winning a title after 43 years) while SIC played their 10th. final (with an impressive record of 7 out of 9 finals won).

CUBA won the match 10–9, achieving their 15th. league title.

== Qualified teams ==
Team	Previous final app.
CUBA	**2013**, 2014, 2015
SIC	1998, **1999**, **2002**, **2003**, **2004**, 2005, **2010**, **2011**, **2019**

Note

- **Bold** indicates winning years

== Venue ==
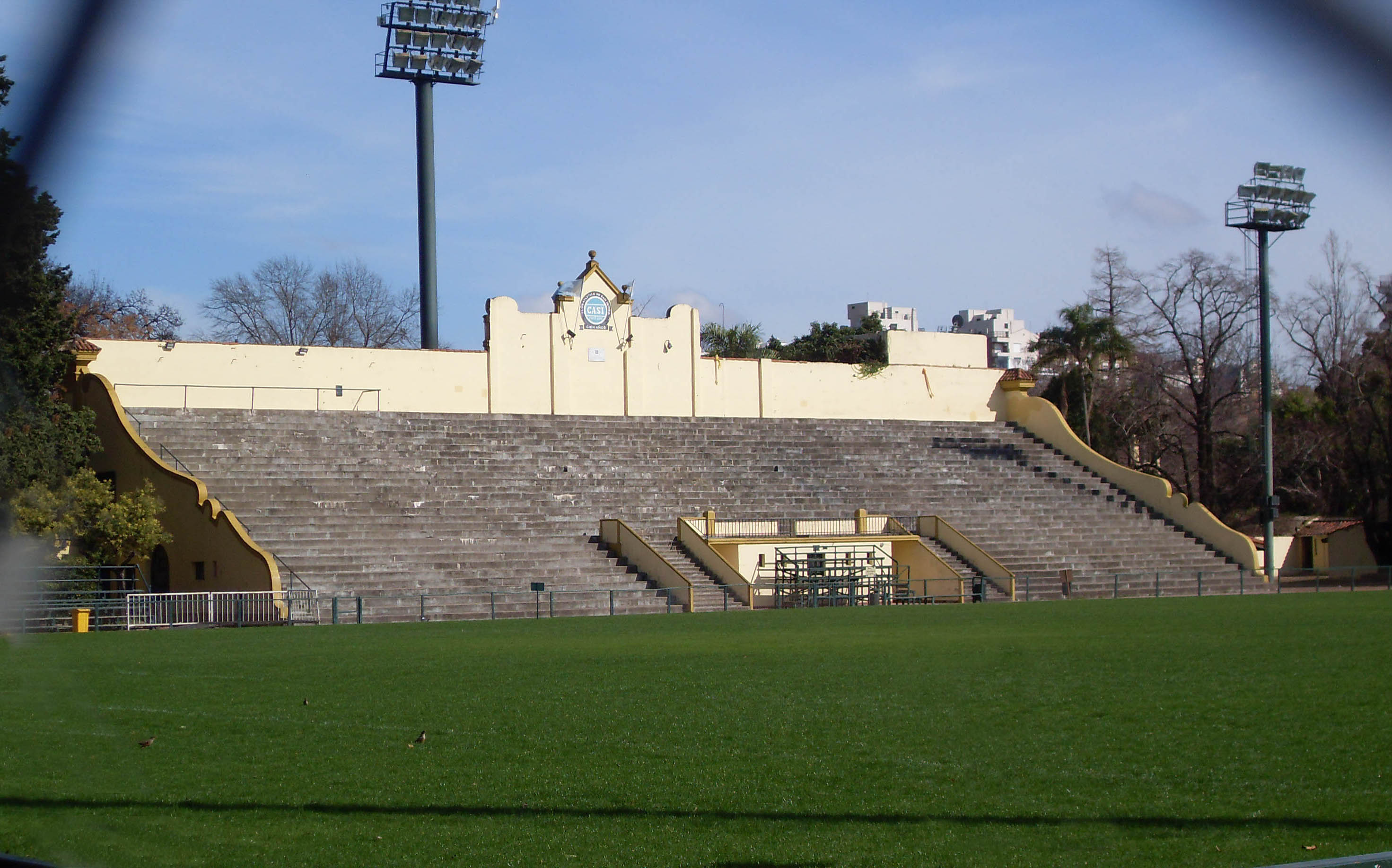
La Catedral, venue for the final

The final was held in La Catedral ("the Cathedral of rugby"), nickname of Estadio del CASI, earned due to it is distant 500 mts from the San Isidro Cathedral, a historic landmark since 1963. which has been the venue of URBA finals since 2008. The stadium, with capacity for 4,500 spectactors, is one of the oldest in Argentina so the club has always been on the same site since 1902, when Manuel Aguirre, owner of a large chacra on Sánez Peña street, gave the club a portion to settle down there.

The stadium is located in downtown San Isidro, has a lighting system for night matches and a concrete grandstand inaugurated in the 1920s. When San Isidro competed in football tournament organised by AFA, the stadium was also used for that sport.

== Road to the final ==
Due to delays after the COVID-19 pandemic, the championship was shortened. In the first round, teams played each other in a single round-robin tournament format.

In the second stage, the 12 teams were divided into two zones (A and B), keeping the points earned in the first round and playing each other once.

The best two placed teams from each zone qualified to the semifinals in order to decide which clubs would play the final.

CUBA		Round	SIC	
Opponent	Result	First	Opponent	Result
San Luis	32–12 (H)	Matchd. 1	Pucará	43–22 (H)
CASI	8–0 (A)	Matchd. 2	Belgrano	29–19 (A)
Buenos Aires C&RC	24–15 (H)	Matchd. 3	Los Tilos	78–6 (H)
Regatas BV	35–3 (A)	Matchd. 4	Hindú	21–5 (A)
Belgrano	36–22 (H)	Matchd. 5	San Luis	36–29 (H)
Hindú	25–36 (A)	Matchd. 6	Newman	19–24 (A)
Newman	23–25 (H)	Matchd. 7	CASI	41–15 (H)
SIC	8–13 (H)	Matchd. 8	CUBA	13–8 (A)
Alumni	28–25 (A)	Matchd. 9	Buenos Aires C&RC	40–0 (H)
Pucará	45–27 (H)	Matchd. 10	Alumni	28–20 (A)
Los Tilos	22–19 (A)	Matchd. 11	Regatas BV	48–29 (H)
Zone A		Second	Zone B	
Los Tilos	40–24 (H)	Matchd. 1	Buenos Aires C&RC	57–36 (H)
SIC	26–20 (H)	Matchd. 2	CUBA	20–26 (A)
CASI	19–16 (A)	Matchd. 3	Belgrano	23–18 (H)
Buenos Aires C&RC	35–24 (H)	Matchd. 4	CASI	35–13 (A)
Belgrano	19–40 (A)	Matchd. 5	Los Tilos	13–11 (H)
Pos. / Team / Pts. / P / W / T / L / Ps / Pc / Pd / Qualif.; 1 / SIC / 60 / 5 / 4 / 0 / 1 / 148 / 104 / 44 / Semifinals; 2 / CUBA / 54 / 5 / 4 / 0 / 1 / 139 / 124 / 15 / Semifinals		Final standings	Pos. / Team / Pts. / P / W / T / L / Ps / Pc / Pd / Qualif.; 1 / Newman / 63 / 5 / 5 / 0 / 0 / 197 / 70 / 127 / Semifinals; 2 / Hindú / 56 / 15 / 3 / 0 / 2 / 163 / 144 / 19 / Semifinals	
CUBA		Round	SIC	
Opponent	Result	Stage	Opponent	Result
Newman	16–15 (A)	Semifinals	Hindú	28–28 (H) (Note: No extra time; SIC qualified to the final due to having been best placed in the general table.)

== Match ==
The first half saw both teams pairing forces, with neither team looking to take risks. The first advantage of the match came in the 7th minute through the foot of Marcos Moroni, who converted a penalty for CUBA. Later, at 15, after a frantic attack by SIC, Gastón Arias would do the same to tie the score at three. Eight minutes later, after a new incisive attack by the tricolor squad and thanks to the accuracy of Arias, SIC would go ahead for the first time in the match by 6 to 3.

The start of the second half was identical to the first, which was characterized by strategic play with the foot and both sides avoiding risks. But at 11 minutes, after a good movement by CUBA's backs, Lucas Piña, just like against Hindú in the semifinal, scored the only try of the match to put CUBA leading the score again. Marcos Moroni completed the conversion to leave the score 10–6 in favor of the university team.

However, the SIC reacted quickly through the foot of Joaquín Lamas, a man who returned from the 7s team, and thus shortened the distance to only one point with more than half time remaining. The rest of the match was very even until the 38th minute, when SIC attacked with their forwards and went in search of turning the score around. But Joaquín Lamas's drop, who had hit an identical situation in 2019 when SIC crowned champion, this time went wide. There was no time left for more after the failed drop, and CUBA finally won their 15th. URBA title.

=== Match details ===
11 Dec 2021

**CUBA**	**10–9**	**SIC**
Try: Pina 50'; Con: Moroni 50'; Pen: Moroni 7'	Report	Pen: Arias 15', 23', Lamas 57'

Estadio del CASI, San Isidro
Attendance: 4,500
Referee: Pablo Deluca

**CUBA**

**SIC**

FB	15	Marcos Moroni
RW	14	Marcos Young
OC	13	Bautista Casaurang
IC	12	Felipe de la Vega
LW	11	Benjamín Ocampo	(substituted off) 52'
FH	10	Rodrigo Avalos
SH	9	Rafael Iriarte
N8	8	Benito Ortiz de Rozas
OF	7	Segundo Pisani (c)
BF	6	Lucas Maguire	(substituted off) 69'
RL	20	Lucas Pina
LL	4	Santiago Uriarte
TP	3	Estanislao Carullo	(substituted off) 62'
HK	2	Enrique Devoto	(substituted off) 65'
LP	1	Nicolás Solveyra
Substitutions:
P		Benjamin Gutiérrez Meabe	(substituted on) 52'
P		Francisco Garoby	(substituted on) 62'
FW		Juan Pedro Garoby	(substituted on) 65'
FB		Pedro Mastroizzi	(substituted on) 69'
Coaches:
(Argentina) Tomás Coppola (Argentina) Agustín Benedicto (Argentina) Federico Sala

FB	15	Juan Pablo Zervino	(substituted off) 52'
RW	14	Jacinto Campbell
OC	21	Carlos Pirán
IC	12	Santos Rubio
LW	11	Justo Piccardo
FH	10	Gastón Arias
SH	9	Juan Soares Gache	(substituted off) 74'
N8	8	Tomás Meyrelles (c)
OF	7	Tomás Comissatti	(substituted off) 52'
BF	6	Marcos Borghi
RL	5	Lucas Sommer
LL	4	Federico Haedo	(substituted off) 70'
TP	3	Marcos Gatica
HK	2	Andrea Panzarini
LP	1	Marcos Piccinini
Substitutions:
P		Joaquin Lamas	(substituted on) 52'
P		Lucas Rocha	(substituted on) 52'
FW		Alejo Daireaux	(substituted on) 70'
FB		Mateo Albanese	(substituted on) 74'
Coaches:
(Argentina) Santiago González Bonorino (Argentina) Lucas Cilley (Argentina) Federico Gallo
