= 2024 URBA Top 12 final =

Rugby union match in Argentina

- Event: 2024 Top 12
Alumni	Belgrano
20	17
- after extra time (via sudden death method)
- Date: 26 Oct 2024
- Venue: Estadio del CASI, San Isidro, Argentina
- Man of the Match: Joaquín Díaz Luzzi
- Referee: Pablo Deluca
- Attendance: 4,500

The 2024 URBA Top 12 final was the final of the 125th. edition of Torneo de la URBA, the regional rugby union competition organised by Unión de Rugby de Buenos Aires (URBA). It is the oldest rugby competition in South America and one of the oldest club competitions in the world.

The match was contested by Alumni and Belgrano A.C., and was held in Estadio del CASI. Since the URBA implemented the playoffs system in 1998, it was the 8th. final contested by Alumni (with only one of them being victorious, in 2018 vs Hindú) while Belgrano played their 3rd. final, with one title won in 2016.

Alumni won the match 20–17 with a sudden death drop goal by Joaquín Díaz Luzzi (chosen as player of the match), winning their 7th. league title.

== History of a rivalry ==
Alumni and Belgrano have a rivalry that was born in early XX century, when they played football in the Argentine top division, Primera División. Defunct Alumni Athletic Club (predecessor to the current club) was the most winning team in those years with 22 titles, and is regarded as a milestone for the development of football in the country.

On the other hand, Belgrano was also a leading force, having won 6 titles between 1899 and 1908. and notable footballers such as Charles Edgard Dickinson Arturo Forrester, and Arnold Watson Hutton, who also played for Alumni.

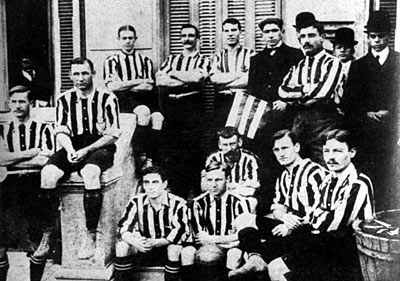
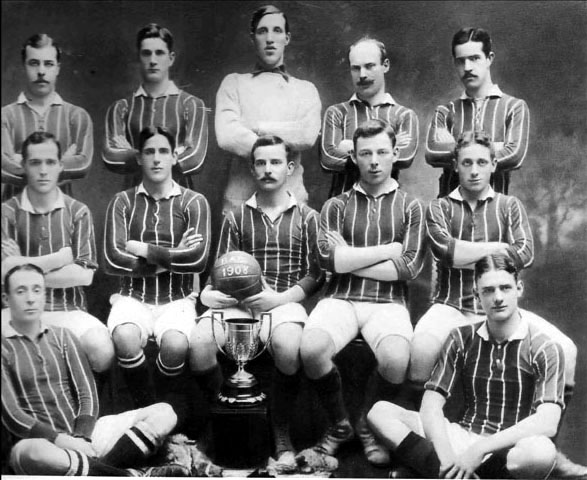
Alumni A.C. (1906) and Belgrano (1908) teams during their football years, when the rivalry was born. In 1951, with the creation of Asociación Alumni, the rivalry revived on a field

The football rivalry lasted until 1911, when Alumni played their last championship before being definitely disbanded two years later. On the other hand, Belgrano was relegated to the second division in 1916. The club later disaffiliated from the Argentine Association, focusing on rugby and other sports.

When "Asociación Alumni" was established in 1951, the rivalry revived. The recently created club debuted in the seventh division v Belgrano, in a match ended 0–0. But it was not until 1970 when both teams faced for the first time in Primera División after Alumni won the segunda championship promoting to the top level.

On 22 April 1973 Belgrano defeated Alumni 6115 in which still remains as Virrey del Pino team's biggest win in El Clásico. On the other hand, Alumni's biggest win was on 10 May 1986 when they beat BAC 49–15.

== Qualified teams ==
Team	Previous final app.
Alumni	2004, 2006, 2007, 2011, 2017, **2018**, 2023
Belgrano	**2016**, 2019

Note

- **Bold** indicates winning years

== Venue ==
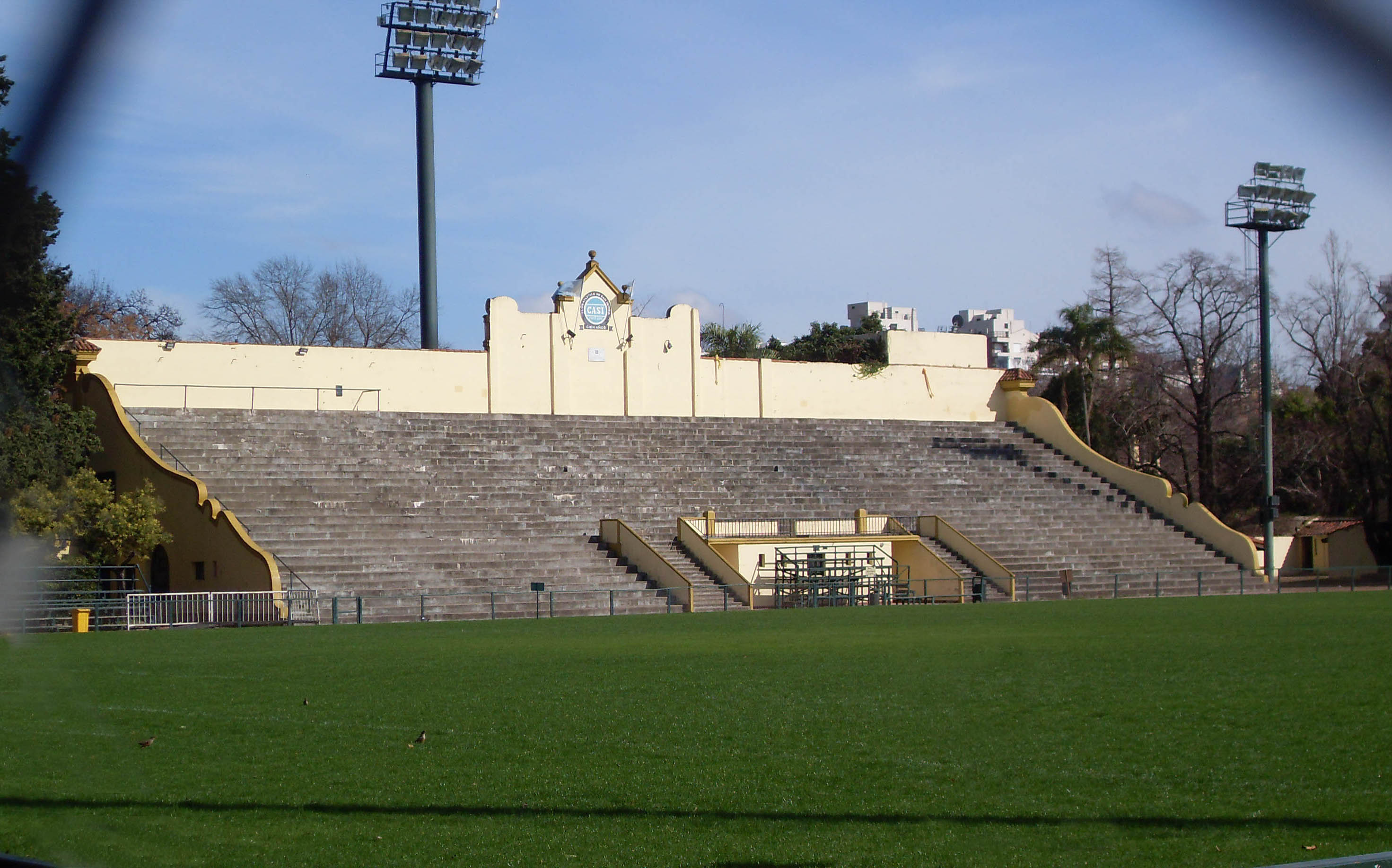
La Catedral, venue for the final

The final was held in La Catedral ("the Cathedral of rugby"), nickname of Estadio del CASI, earned due to it is distant 500 mts from the San Isidro Cathedral, a historic landmark since 1963. which has been the venue of URBA finals since 2008. The stadium, with capacity for 4,500 spectactors, is one of the oldest in Argentina so the club has always been on the same site since 1902, when Manuel Aguirre, owner of a large chacra on Sánez Peña street, gave the club a portion to settle down there.

The stadium is located in downtown San Isidro, has a lighting system for night matches and a concrete grandstand inaugurated in the 1920s. When San Isidro competed in football tournament organised by AFA, the stadium was also used for that sport.

== Road to the final ==
After the regular season, four teams qualified to the semifinals in order to decide the two clubs that played the final.

Alumni		Round	Belgrano	
Opponent	Result	Stage	Opponent	Result
Champagnat	37–30 (H)	Matchday 1	Regatas BV	24–13 (A)
San Luis	18–17 (A)	Matchday 2	CASI	14–12 (H)
Atletico del Rosario	37–8 (H)	Matchday 3	CUBA	42–41 (A)
Regatas BV	18–13 (A)	Matchday 4	SIC	24–32 (H)
Newman	37–26 (H)	Matchday 5	Champagnat	49–18 (A)
CASI	20–55 (A)	Matchday 6	Atletico del Rosario	69–22 (H)
Buenos Aires CRC	42–16 (H)	Matchday 7	Newman	56–26 (A)
CUBA	26–44 (A)	Matchday 8	Buenos Aires CRC	31–27 (H)
Belgrano	9–22 (H)	Matchday 9	Alumni	22–9 (A)
SIC	31–22 (A)	Matchday 10	Hindú	23–26 (H)
Hindú	24–19 (H)	Matchday 11	San Luis	40–22 (H)
Champagnat	25–18 (A)	Matchday 12	Regatas BV	22–12 (H)
San Luis	19–16 (H)	Matchday 13	CASI	41–37 (A)
Atletico del Rosario	51–26 (A)	Matchday 14	CUBA	30–22 (H)
Regatas BV	32–10 (H)	Matchday 15	SIC	21–34 (A)
Newman	19–30 (A)	Matchday 16	Champagnat	47–25 (H)
CASI	37–25 (H)	Matchday 17	Atletico del Rosario	31–35 (A)
Buenos Aires CRC	27–17 (A)	Matchday 18	Newman	9–23 (H)
CUBA	39–24 (H)	Matchday 19	Buenos Aires CRC	21–22 (A)
Belgrano	23–25 (A)	Matchday 20	Alumni	25–23 (H)
SIC	13–20 (H)	Matchday 21	Hindú	42–29 (A)
Pos. / Team / Pts. / P / W / T / L / PS / PC / Qualification; 1 / Newman / 77 / 22 / 17 / 0 / 5 / 749 / 501 / Semifinalists; 2 / SIC / 75 / 22 / 17 / 1 / 4 / 661 / 459 / Semifinalists; 3 / Alumni / 73 / 22 / 16 / 0 / 6 / 627 / 502 / Semifinalists; 4 / Belgrano / 71 / 22 / 15 / 0 / 7 / 720 / 539 / Semifinalists
Alumni		Round	Belgrano	
Opponent	Result	Stage	Opponent	Result
SIC	30–21 (A)	Semifinals	Newman	28–27 (A)

== Match ==
Just as the match began, Belgrano opened the scoring with a penalty kick from the league's leading scorer, fullback Juan Landó at 4'. After several attacking attempts by Alumni, Belgrano capitalized on an opponent's mistake and scored a try thanks to an interception by Augusto Vaccarino. Towards the end of the first half, Joaquín Díaz Luzzi narrowed the gap with a try kick. Before halftime, Fuentes intercepted a pass and ran the length of the field but failed to score. The teams went into the break with Belgrano Athletic holding a 10–3 lead.

In the second half, the Virrey del Pino side again scored early. In the second minute, Joaquín Moro scored, and Juan Landó converted with his kick. From then on, they were unable to extend their lead. However, Alumni leveled the score with a penalty try, followed by another run of almost 100 meters by Ramón Fuentes, who this time successfully scored. Díaz Luzzi's conversion brought the score level. The tie persisted until the final buzzer, and after a 17–17 draw in the eighty minutes, the game went to extra time.

In sudden death, Landó missed a drop goal from midfield in the opening seconds. From then on, Alumni launched an attack until they reached the try zone. That perseverance paid off. Six minutes later, Joaquín Díaz Luzzi sealed the title with a drop goal to give Alumni their seventh league title.

=== Match details ===
26 Oct 2024

**Alumni**	**20–17 (a.e.t.)**	**Belgrano**
Try: Fuentes 69'; Con: 47', Díaz Luzzi 69'; Pen: Díaz Luzzi 30'; Drop: Díaz Luzzi 86'	Report	Try: Vaccarino 27', Moro 42'; Con: Landó 27', 42'; Pen: Landó 4'

Estadio del CASI, San Isidro
Attendance: 4,500
Referee: Pablo Deluca

**Alumni**
**Belgrano**

FB	15	Santiago González Iglesias	(substituted off) 49'
RW	14	Santiago Pernas
OC	13	Tomás Cubilla
IC	12	Franco Battezzati
LW	11	Ramón Fuentes	(substituted off) 77'
FH	10	Joaquín Díaz Luzzi
SH	9	Tomás Passerotti
N8	8	Santiago Montagner
OF	7	Patricio Anderson
BF	6	Ignacio Cubilla	(substituted off) 70'
RL	5	Bernardo Quaranta	(substituted off) 44'
LL	4	Manuel Mora
TP	3	Bautista Vidal	(substituted off) 44'
HK	2	Tomás Bivort (c)
LP	1	Federico Lucca	(substituted off) 44'
Substitutions:
P		Máximo Castrillo	(substituted on) 44'
P		Tomás Rapetti	(substituted on) 44'
FW		Santiago Alduncín	(substituted on) 44'
FB		Alejo González Chávez	(substituted on) 49'
FL		Tobías Moyano	(substituted on) 70'
FW		Cruz González Bibolini	(substituted on) 77'
Coaches:
(Argentina) Rodrigo Jiménez Salice (Argentina) Hernán Ballatore

FB	15	Juan Landó
RW	14	Pedro Arana
OC	13	Tomás Etchepare
IC	12	Martín Arana
LW	11	Ignacio Diaz		(substituted off) 56'
FH	10	Juan Aparicio
SH	9	Tomás Cubelli		(substituted off) 70'
N8	8	Joaquín Moro
OF	7	Julián Rebussone		(substituted off) 51'
BF	6	Joaquín De la Serna	Booked
RL	5	Augusto Vaccarino
LL	4	Juan Penoucos		(substituted off) 68'
TP	3	Lisandro García Dragui		(substituted off) 51'
HK	2	Francisco Lusarreta
LP	1	Francisco Ferronato (c)		(substituted off) 70'
Substitutions:
P		Justo Durañona		(substituted on) 51'
FL		Franco Vega		(substituted on) 51'
W		Tobías Bernabé		(substituted on) 56'
L		Luciano Tecca		(substituted on) 68'
SH		Ignacio Marino		(substituted on) 70'
P		Santiago García Botta		(substituted on) 70'
Coaches:
(Argentina) Guillermo Tramezzani (Argentina) Luis Gradín (Argentina) Francisco Gradín
