= 1899 River Plate Rugby Union Championship =

Rugby union club championship held in Argentina

1899 RPRU championship
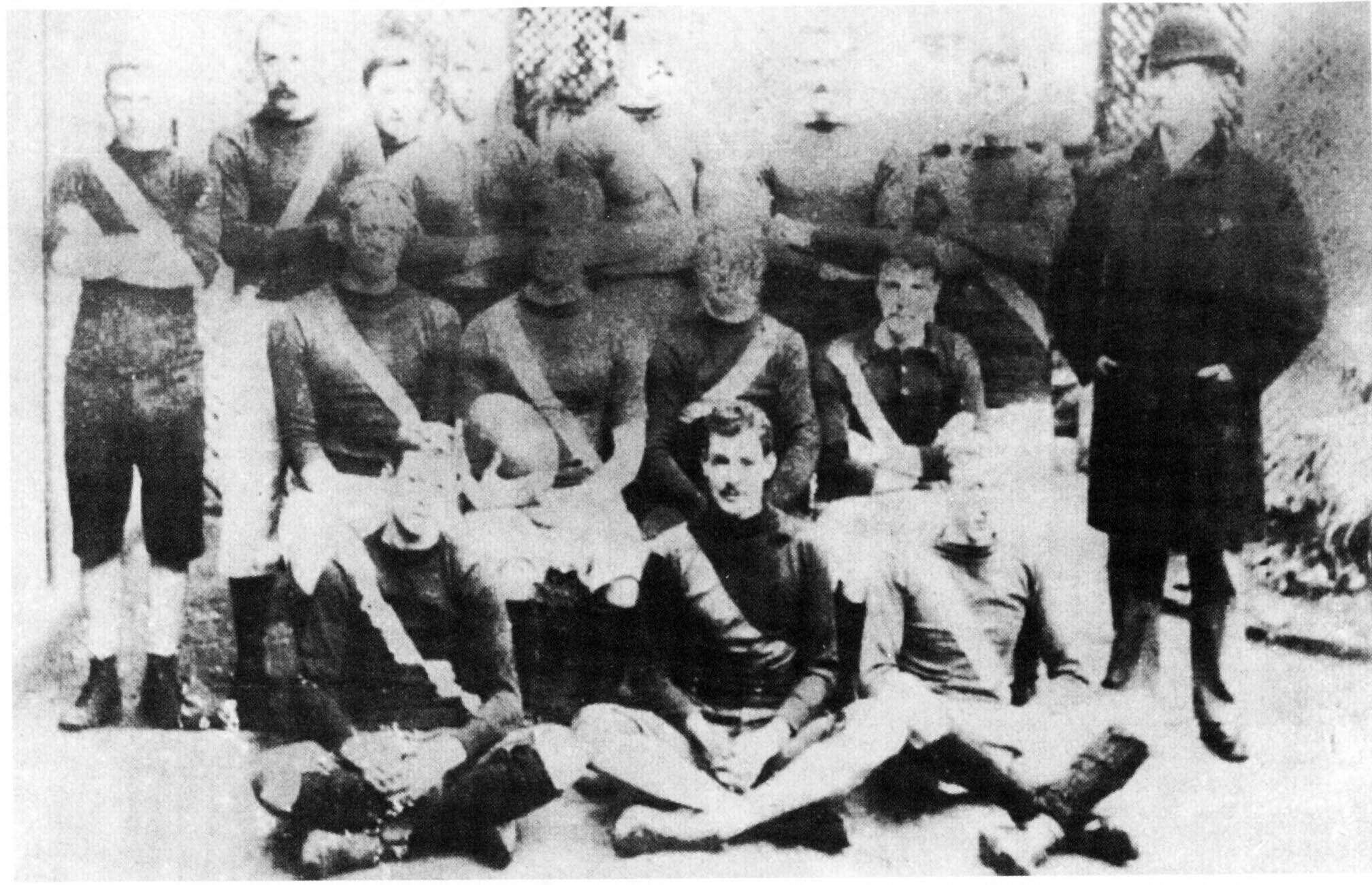
- Lomas A.C., champions
- Countries: Argentina
- Number of teams: 5
- Champions: Lomas
- Runners-up: Rosario A.C.
- Relegated: (None)

The 1899 River Plate Rugby Union championship was the inaugural season of the RPRU championship, the first rugby union club competition held in Argentina, organised by the "River Plate Rugby Union" (current Argentine Rugby Union). It was contested by the five founding members of the RPRU: Belgrano, Rosario, Lomas, Buenos Aires, and Flores.

Uruguayan club Montevideo C.C. was invited to take part of the competition but they declined to participate due to the long travel time to Argentina by ship.

In the inaugural game, Lomas defeated Buenos Aires by 11-4. Lomas would be the first Argentine champion, winning the title at the end of the season.

== Teams ==
Club	Headquarters	Estab.	Venue
Belgrano A.C.	Belgrano	1896	Virrey del Pino
Buenos Aires F.C.	Belgrano (Note: Established the Buenos Aires English High School, where famous football team Alumni would be found in 1898)	1886	(None) (Note: The club did not have an own venue, playing their home games at Virrey del Pino and Lomas.)
Flores A.C.	Flores	1893	Flores Old Ground
Lomas A.C.	Lomas de Zamora	1891	Lomas Field
Rosario A.C.	Rosario	1867	Plaza Jewell

== Results ==
List of matches played in the season. Rosario A.C. entered directly in the semifinals.

=== First round ===
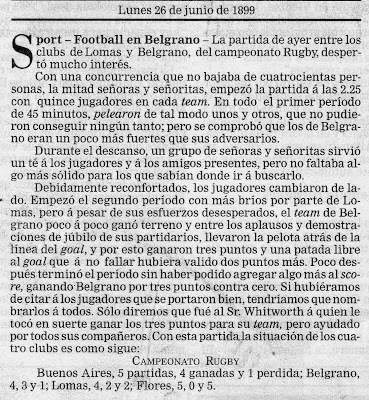
Chronicle of the match: Belgrano (3) v Lomas (0) on La Nación

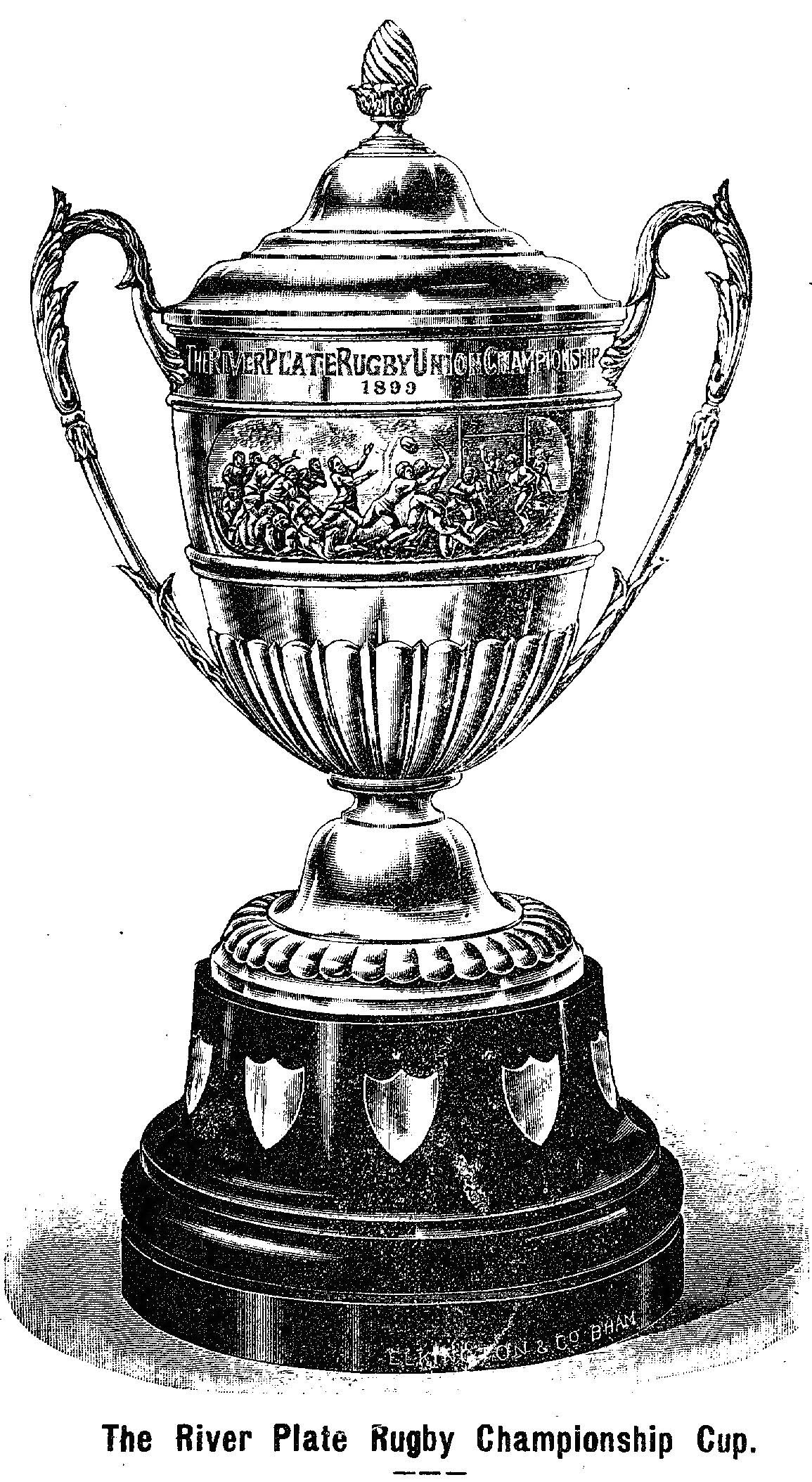
The trophy awarded to Lomas, first champion

Date	Home	Res.	Away	Venue
11 May	Lomas	11–4	Buenos Aires	Lomas Field
?	Flores	0–16	Belgrano	Flores Old Ground
28 May	Flores	0–24	Buenos Aires	Flores Old Ground
1 June	Belgrano	3–24	Buenos Aires	Virrey del Pino
4 June	Flores	5–15	Lomas	Lomas Field
11 June	Lomas	8–11	Buenos Aires	Lomas Field
18 June	Belgrano	17–3	Flores	Virrey del Pino
24 June	Buenos Aires	14–0	Flores	Lomas Field
25 June	Belgrano	3–0	Lomas	Virrey del Pino
2 July	Buenos Aires	3–5	Belgrano	Lomas Field
9 July	Flores	0–18	Lomas	Flores Old Ground
16 July	Lomas	10–3	Belgrano	Lomas Field

==== Table standings ====
Team	Pts.	Pld.	W	D	L	Qualification
Belgrano	8	6	4	0	2	Advanced to semi-finals
Buenos Aires	8	6	4	0	2	Advanced to semi-finals
Lomas	8	6	4	0	2	Advanced to semi-finals
Flores	0	6	0	0	6	Eliminated

=== Semifinals ===
Date	Home	Res.	Away	Venue	City
23 July	Rosario	11–0	Buenos Aires	Plaza Jewell	Rosario

Date	Home	Res.	Away	Venue	City
23 July	Lomas	16–0	Belgrano	Flores Old Ground	Buenos Aires

The forwards of Buenos Aires were treated with little respect by their opponents, who, in the scrums and in the open game, were much superior. No game ever started in this sensational way, since 20 seconds into the kick-off, Rosario registered a try between the clubs, a feast that gave the visitors a great shock, of which, we are inclined to think that they never recovered. As usual, the visitors were entertained in the most hospitable way, and in spite of having been defeated, they enjoyed the trip. After the game, the two teams and some of their friends met the President Mr. Diego Le Bas, for the usual toasts. The best of the teams was the winner and the BAFC Captain, hit the nail on the head, when he proposed a toast in honor of the health of the Plaza captain saying: If Buenos Aires could not win, there was no other Club for which they preferred to be knocked out than Rosario's.

— chronicle of the final on The River Plate Sports & Pastime newspaper

=== Final ===
The final was played at Flores Old Ground in Caballito, Buenos Aires. All proceeds were donated to the British Hospital of Buenos Aires. In a match where both teams showed to be equalled in strength of play, Lomas won the game when they were awarded a free-kick that captain F.H. Jacobs scored for a 3–0 win.

30 July 1899

Lomas A.C.	3–0	Rosario A.C.
Con: F.H. Jacobs	Report

Flores Old Ground, Buenos Aires

Lomas	Rosario

FB	S. Mohr Bell
B	H.A. Cowes
B	A.J. MacMorran
B	A. Anderson
B	H.B. Anderson
HB	H. Mohr Bell
HB	C.W. Romer
FW	E.H. Liversidge
FW	H.P. Wright
FW	A.A. Miller
FW	T.R. Abbott
FW	R. Smiles
FW	C.H. Campbell
FW	Franck Chevallier Boutell
FW	F.H. Jacobs (c)

FB	G. Smythies
B	E.M. Pixton
B	H. Colson
B	F.W. Boardman
B	H. Dorning
HB	R. Dorning
HB	G. Topping
FW	J.A. Beaumont
FW	L. Jacobs
FW	F.C. Thurn
FW	E. Jewell
FW	A.J. Sykes
FW	C.B. Bradbury
FW	A.S. Wilcox
FW	P.W. Pixton

== Aftermath ==
It was the first and only championship contested by Flores A.C. A pioneer in several sports disciplines in Argentina, Flores A.C. had played its first match on 19 July 1896, against Buenos Aires F.C. In 1907 Flores Athletic sold some of its facilities to neighbor Club Ferro Carril Oeste, for m$n 700. It is believed that the club was dissolved after this transaction.

Before disappearing, Flores had also took part in the first Primera División championship in 1891. The polo team of the institution also won the fourth edition of Abierto de Polo in 1894.
