= Agustín Canalda =

Argentine rugby union player (born 1977)

- Born: April 18, 1977 (age 49) Buenos Aires, Argentina
- Height: 6 ft 0 in (1.83 m)
- Weight: 218 lb (99 kg)

Rugby union career
- Position: Hooker
Senior career
Years	Team	Apps	(Points)
1999-2001	Club Newman		
International career
Years	Team	Apps	(Points)
1999-2001	Argentina	6	(0)

Agustín Canalda (born 18 April 1977 in Buenos Aires) is an Argentine rugby union footballer. He plays as a hooker.

Canalda's first team was Club Newman, where he had his first caps for Argentina U-19. He had 6 caps for the "Pumas", from 1999 to 2001, without scoring. Canalda was selected for the 1999 Rugby World Cup finals, where he played once.
