= 2026 URBA Top 14 =

Rugby union season in Argentina

- Countries: Argentina
- Number of teams: 14
- Champions: Newman (2nd title)
- Runners-up: Hindú
- Promoted: Los Matreros; Atlético del Rosario; Champagnat
- Relegated: Los Matreros; Champagnat
- Matches played: 185

The 2026 URBA Top 14 (officially named URBA Top 14 Copa Macro for sponsorship reasons) was the 127th. edition of Top 14, a rugby union club competition held in Argentina organised by the Unión de Rugby de Buenos Aires (URBA). The tournament is contested by fourteen teams, 12 from the Buenos Aires Province, one from the autonomous city of Buenos Aires, and one from Rosario in Santa Fe Province.

The entire season started on 14 March and finished on 7 November 2026.

Promoted clubs from the 2025 URBA Second division (Primera A) were Los Matreros, Atlético del Rosario (champions and runners-up respectively), and Champagnat (winner of 2025 Permanencia).

At the end of the regular season, Champagnat and Los Matreros were relegated after they finished in the last positions in the tournament table.

== Format ==
The 14 clubs played each other in a double round-robin tournament. The four best placed teams (1st. to 4th.) at the end of the season, qualified to the semifinals, played in a single-elimination format.

== Teams ==
Teams competing at Top 14 were:

Club	Location	Stadium
Alumni	Manuel Alberti (Note: Town in Pilar Partido.)	Estadio de Alumni
Atlético del Rosario	Rosario	Plaza Jewell
Belgrano A.C.	Buenos Aires	Virrey del Pino
Buenos Aires C&RC	Victoria	Estadio de BAC&RC
C.A. San Isidro	San Isidro	La Catedral
Champagnat	Pilar	Estancias del Pilar
CUBA	Villa de Mayo	Estadio del CUBA
Hindú	Don Torcuato	Estadio de Hindú
La Plata	Manuel Gonnet	Estadio de La Plata RC
Los Matreros	Morón	Estadio de Los Matreros
Newman	Benavídez	Brother Timothy O'Brien
Regatas	Bella Vista	Estadio de Regatas
San Isidro Club	Boulogne	La Zanja
Los Tilos	Tolosa	Estadio de Los Tilos

== Regular season ==
=== Matches ===
Home \ Away	ALU	ARO	BAC	BUE	CAS	CHA	CUB	HIN	LAP	MAT	NEW	REG	SIC	TIL
Alumni		54–20	26–21	43–25	14–22	48–5	27–25	17–23	42–22	18–23	30–32	33–14	59–15	52–26
Atlético del Rosario	23–38		35–33	59–28	31–36	42–22	41–34	32–30	25–41	28–38	41–45	12–20	46–45	37–39
Belgrano A.C.	36–43	27–21		36–20	43–40	24–30	21–33	36–13	28–19	45–36	25–33	8–26	58–40	30–40
Buenos Aires	20–15	37–34	31–55		26–27	31–16	20–50	12–34	29–32	25–17	23–36	26–32	13–37	22–48
CASI	28–23	47–13	27–25	39–25		47–30	41–27	12–15	45–15	50–17	27–37	38–14	23–26	33–31
Champagnat	7–76	22–27	12–38	13–10	16–40		24–49	33–43	20–30	9–30	21–41	24–57	7–24	24–59
CUBA	31–66	43–17	36–41	29–51	37–38	25–29		16–26	33–35	78–22	25–31	19–10	30–44	29–44
Hindú	43–37	68–33	39–22	32–21	8–29	62–26	43–36		63–12	59–22	25–26	20–23	24–18	52–18
La Plata	20–33	29–36	34–33	23–25	13–39	22–7	26–31	28–39		44–23	19–34	36–3	31–38	19–20
Los Matreros	29–52	25–22	38–35	26–36	24–48	27–26	27–31	48–66	23–7		3–69	27–25	26–62	23–32
Newman	29–19	54–29	31–17	31–3	37–28	47–8	21–21	40–20	16–15	52–28		40–17	10–37	43–25
Regatas BV	24–27	50–17	13–15	16–32	27–31	23–13	26–23	10–40	53–28	61–7	21–36		16–24	29–20
SIC	33–23	46–17	58–18	48–25	13–18	39–20	40–25	31–32	71–19	25–20	25–26	39–21		17–27
Los Tilos	12–31	32–39	34–34	24–21	33–15	34–29	33–42	40–32	17–13	33–27	11–41	21–17	20–30	

Source: URBA
Legend: Blue = home team win; Yellow = draw; Red = away team win.

=== Table ===
Unlike the previous season, there was no "permanencia" playoffs to define relegations. The two teams placed in the last positions (Los Matreros and Champagnat) were directly relegated to the second division ("Primera A").

Pos.	Team	Pts.	P	W	T	L	Ps	Pc	Pd	Qualification
1	Newman	110	26	24	1	1	938	563	375	Semifinals
2	CASI	90	26	20	0	6	868	620	248	Semifinals
3	Hindú	89	26	19	0	7	951	678	273	Semifinals
4	Alumni	86	26	17	0	9	946	608	338	Semifinals
5	SIC	86	26	18	0	8	925	654	271	
6	Los Tilos	69	26	15	1	10	773	781	-8	
7	Belgrano A.C.	58	26	11	1	14	804	808	-4	
8	Regatas BV	56	26	11	0	15	648	656	-8	
9	CUBA	51	26	9	1	16	858	844	14	
10	Atlético del Rosario	43	26	9	0	17	777	983	-206	
11	La Plata	42	26	8	0	18	632	826	-194	
12	Buenos Aires C&RC	40	26	8	0	18	637	852	-215	
13	Los Matreros	36	26	8	0	18	656	1038	-382	Relegated
14	Champagnat	15	26	3	0	23	493	995	-502	Relegated

== Final stages ==
=== Semifinals ===
Top 14 – Semifinals; 30 and 31 Oct
Newman	25
Alumni	20
CASI	12
Hindú	16

Top 14 – Final; 7 Nov
Newman	33
Hindú	32

==== Details ====
30 Oct 2026	Newman	25–20	Alumni	Estadio del CASI, San Isidro
20:10	Try: Marolda 13' (try penal) 46'; Perkins 75'; Pen: Gutiérrez Taboada 3', 13', 67'	Report	Try: Cubilla 7', 16'; Con: Cansani 7', 16'; Pen: Cansani 21', 33'	Attendance: ~7,000; Referee: Mauro Rossi

31 Oct 2026	CASI	12–16	Hindú	Estadio del CASI, San Isidro
17:10	Pen: Akemeier 2', 31', 44', 70'	Report	Try: Amaya 26'; Pen: Farisé 6', 22', 26', 69'	Referee: Tómas Bertazza

=== Final ===
7 Nov 2026	Newman	33–32	Hindú	Estadio del CASI, San Isidro
		Report

== Top scorers ==
Juan Akemeier of CASI was the top scorer of the season. Beltrán Landívar (Regatas Bella Vista) and Beltrán Salese (Newman) scored the most tries in 2026.

=== Most points ===
#	Player	Club	P.
1	Juan Akemeier	CASI	340
2	Manuel Nogués	Atl. Rosario	334
3	Gonzalo G. Taboada	Newman	294
4	Bautista Santamarina	Los Tilos	279
5	Bautista Canzani	Alumni	266

=== Most tries ===
#	Player	Club	T.
1	Beltrán Landívar	Regatas BV	21
1	Beltrán Salese	Newman	21
2	Tomás Bivort	Alumni	20
3	Juan Torres Obeid	CASI	19
4	Agustín Capurro	Hindú	17
4	Boris Cec	Los Matreros	17
4	Tomás Cornejo	Atl. Rosario	17
5	Ignacio Bottazini	SIC	15
