= Buenos Aires Football Club (1886) =

Buenos Aires FC
- Full name: Buenos Aires Football Club
- Founded: 10 June 1886
- Dissolved: 4 May 1951; 74 years ago (merged into Buenos Aires Cricket & Rugby Club)
- Ground: Buenos Aires Cricket Club; Lomas A.C. (Note: The 1899 championship fixture indicated that BAFC played its home venues at Lomas. It is unknown if the club continued using that venue in successive years.)
- League: Torneo de la URBA
- 1950: (unknown)
Home colours

The Buenos Aires Football Club (frequently abbreviated as "BAFC") was an Argentine rugby union club founded in Buenos Aires. Established in 1886 it was predecessor of current Buenos Aires Cricket & Rugby Club. Buenos Aires FC was also a founding member of the Argentine Rugby Union and one of the most successful rugby clubs in Argentina, winning eight River Plate Rugby Union (current "Torneo de la URBA") championships from 1900 to 1915.

== History ==
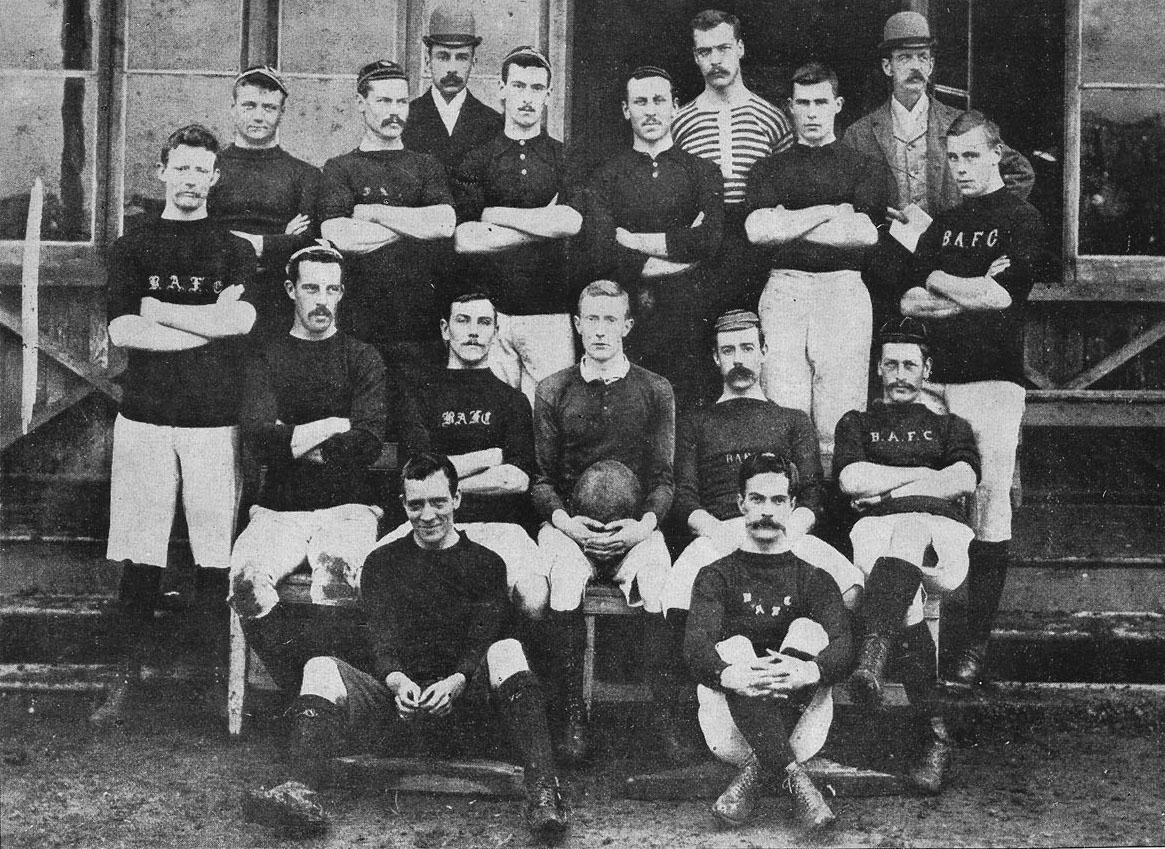
Buenos Aires FC in 1891

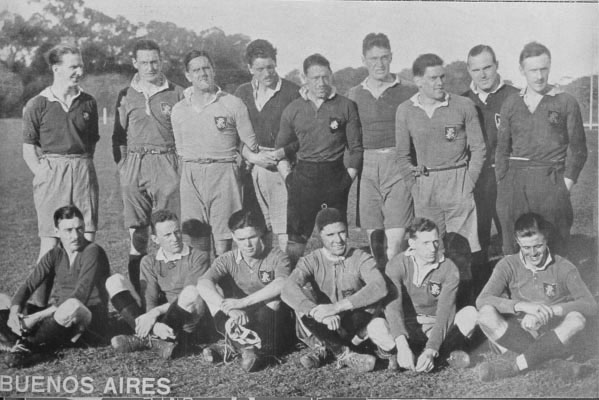
Buenos Aires FC in 1922, as covered by El Gráfico magazine

The club was established on 10 June 1886 in the Buenos Aires English High School by a group of rugby enthusiasts who wanted their own place where they could practise the sport they loved. On 24 June the club played its first match against a team formed by employees of the Buenos Aires Great Southern Railway ("Ferrocarril del Sud").

Buenos Aires FC is regarded to have played the first inter-clubs rugby game in Argentina, when it faced Rosario AC in the city of Rosario on 28 June 1886. On 12 July a second game was played between clubs, Buenos Aires FC being the winner.

In 1899, along with club Belgrano, Rosario, Lomas and Flores, Buenos Aires became founding member of the "River Plate Rugby Championship", which would become today's Argentine Rugby Union. Buenos Aires would also open the first season of the recently created championship, playing Lomas, which defeated Buenos Aires by 11-4. Lomas would finally win the first title at the end of the season.

Buenos Aires later became one of the most successful clubs of Argentina, winning eight championships of 16 contested (five of them consecutively from 1900 to 1904).

After a fire that destroyed the facilities both clubs shared, Buenos Aires FC merged with Buenos Aires Cricket Club in 1951 to form Buenos Aires Cricket & Rugby Club.

== Honours ==
=== Rugby union ===
- RPRU Championship (8):

1900, 1901, 1902, 1903, 1904, 1908, 1909, 1915

== Clarification ==
Due to there were at least two more clubs named "Buenos Aires Football Club", the origins of those institutions must be cleared to avoid confusions:

- The first Buenos Aires Football Club, established in 1867 and recognized as the first football club not only in Argentina but in South America. Having adopted the association football rules at first, the club then switched to rugby union rules in 1874, until it was dissolved in the 1880s.
- In 1891, a third "Buenos Aires Football Club" took part of the first association football championship held in Argentina, being its only participation in an official competition. It is believed that the team was formed exclusively to play the tournament, with no further records about its activities in subsequent years. The team's jersey was red and white in vertical stripes.
