= Club Champagnat =

Argentine sports club

(Argentina) Champagnat
- Full name: Club Champagnat
- Union: URBA
- Nickname: Champa
- Founded: 30 November 1956; 69 years ago
- Location: Buenos Aires (headquarters)
- Ground(s): Pilar, Argentina
- President: Rodolfo Canese
- Coach: Facundo Villanueva
- League: Top 14
- 2026: 14th. (relegated)
Team kit

Official website
- clubchampagnat.com

Club Champagnat is an Argentine sports club. Its headquarters are based in Buenos Aires, while its facilities and stadium are in the "Estancias del Pilar" country club in Pilar.

Champagnat is primarily known for its rugby union team, which currently plays in URBA Top 14, the second division of the URBA league system.. As of 2024, the team has participated in 12 Top 12 seasons. The field hockey team is affiliated to the Buenos Aires Hockey Association (AHBA) in 1999, debuting against Club Ciudad de Buenos Aires. The team won the game 4-0 and would go on to win the championship, remaining undefeated at the end of the season.

Other sports played in Champagnat are football, paddle tennis, and tennis.

== History ==
In 1954, Ángel Diez, then a professor at Colegio Champagnat, along with other religious members of the congregation, registered the school's rugby team in the "River Plate Rugby Union" to play in its tournaments.

The club began playing in the sixth division with a team made up exclusively of school students. On November 30, 1956, the Champagnat Club was officially established, with Lino Landajo being the first president. The club had nine competitive teams by then.

The club hosted all its activities on the Champagnat School field, located in the General San Martín Partido of Greater Buenos Aires. In 1958 the rugby team won the third division championship, thus promoting to the second division, where it played until 1970. Due to a restructuring of the leagues, Champagnat began the 1971 season in the First Division. A year later, the club moved to Malvinas Argentinas Partido, where rugby and field hockey fields, and paddle tennis and tennis courts were built, as well as a swimming pool. In 1982, the women's field hockey section was inaugurated, mainly with the purpose of being entertainment for the daughters of its members because the club did not have an activity specifically for women.

That same year the hockey team played its first official game against Colegio de la Santa Unión, later playing matches with other schools in the region. The team also toured some Argentine provinces, and then traveled outside the country, having toured Uruguay (in 2005) and South Africa (in 2009).

The rugby team was relegated to the second division in 1981, returning to the top level in 1983, although it was sent back to the second division in 1984. In 1993 the team won the Second Division tournament again, remaining in the First Division (Group I) until 2013. In 2014, the team competed in the championship in Primera A division of URBA. In 2017 it was relegated to Primera B.

In 2018, Champagnat competed in the Primera B tournament, finishing in first position in the general table and becoming champion of the category. This granted them direct access to start the year 2019 in Primera A.

In the 2023 campaign, Champagnat was promoted to the Top 12, after qualifying third in the general table and entering the playoffs to compete for the second promotion to the highest category of rugby in Buenos Aires. They beat Los Tilos in the semifinals, to obtain a place in the Top 12 after beating Los Matreros in the final by 42 to 36. Champagnat competed in the URBA Top 12 championship in the 2024 season.

Champagnat returned to the URBA top division in 2025, when the team placed 3rd. in Primera A qualifying for the Permanencia. Champagnat defeat Top 12 team San Luis 18–16 in the final held in Manuel B. Gonnet therefore the team from Pilar promoted and will play the 2026 Top 14 season.

== Facilities ==
Facility	Location	Description	Ref.
Headquarters	Buenos Aires city	Secretary and administration seat	
Sede José Baca Castex ("Estancias del Pilar")	Pilar Partido	Sports complex where Champagnat play their senior matches. It is composed of 4 rugby fields, 14 children rugby fields, 2 hockey fields (artificial grass), 4 tennis courts, 1 gyms, 5 football pitches, 3 paddle tennis courts, 1 swimming pool, plus locker rooms and other facilities	
Training Center "Ángel Diez Pacheco"	El Talar, Tigre Partido	Facility with rugby and hockey fields with both, natural and artificial grass	

== Players in Los Pumas ==
Champagnat players that were capped to Argentina national team are:

#	Player	Pos.	Rival	Debuted
325	Horacio Mazzini	Flanker	France	25 Jun 1977
376	Juan Aguilar	Prop	Chile	16 Jul 1983
558	Martín Durand	Flanker	Chile	4 Oct 1997
710	Ignacio Pasman	Flanker	Chile	8 Nov 2008
726	Ignacio Di Santi	Hooker	Chile	20 May 2009
867	Santiago Grondona	Flanker	New Zealand	14 Nov 2020
