= Club de Rugby Los Tilos =

(Argentina) Los Tilos
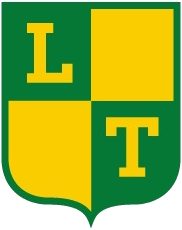
- Full name: Club de Rugby Los Tilos
- Union: URBA
- Founded: 29 January 1944; 82 years ago
- Location: Tolosa, Buenos Aires, Argentina
- Ground: Barrio Obrero
- President: Martín Carrique
- Coach(es): Juan Misson; Luis Violini
- League: Top 14
- 2026: 6th.
Team kit

Official website
- clublostilos.com.ar

Club de Rugby Los Tilos is an Argentine rugby union club based in the city of Tolosa in La Plata Partido, Buenos Aires Province. The team currently plays in Top 12, the first division of the URBA league system.

== History ==
In 1944, the city of La Plata had two rugby clubs: Universitario and La Plata; disabused players of the former seceded and went on to found the Club de Rugby Los Tilos on January 29, 1944.

The name "Los Tilos" was chosen to honour the city's nickname. La Plata is often called "the city of linden tree" because of the large number of that species lining many streets and squares.

Originally sharing the city's university installations, the club moved to its current location in Barrio Obrero at the beginning of the 1950s.

Los Tilos only spent two seasons in the Unión de Rugby de Buenos Aires (URBA) third division before being promoted to second division. Promotion to the top level would come in the 1990s although Los Tilos has been promoted and relegated many times since then.

While the team has won many titles at underage level, Los Tilos has not won any URBA title at senior level to date. The team's best run in the competition was in 2002 when it reached the semi-final stage, eventually losing to San Isidro Club (SIC) 34-20. Some of its team player are Matías Albina, Nicolás Barán, Ramiro Bernal, Federico Cortopasso, Martín Etcheverry, Andrés Fernández, Karim Guevara, Diego Herrera, Federico Méndez, León Salim, Luis y Rafael Silva, Sebastián y Mariano Stephens, Martín Pardo y Andrés Volcoff

Los Tilos won the promotion in 2010 and currently plays at the top level of the URBA league system since 2011 season.
