= Los Matreros Rugby Club =

(Argentina) Los Matreros
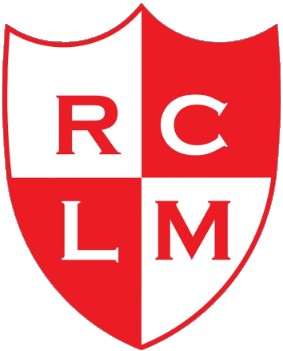
- Full name: Rugby Club Los Matreros
- Union: URBA
- Founded: 28 August 1928; 98 years ago
- Region: Morón, Argentina
- Ground: Morón
- Chairman: Guillermo Ugartemendia
- League: Top 14
- 2026: 13th. (relegated)
Team kit

Rugby Club Los Matreros, simply known as Los Matreros, is an Argentine rugby union and field hockey club headquartered in Morón, in the homonymous partido of Greater Buenos Aires.

The rugby team is also member of the Unión de Rugby de Buenos Aires (URBA), where it plays in Top 14, the top division of the URBA league system.

== History ==
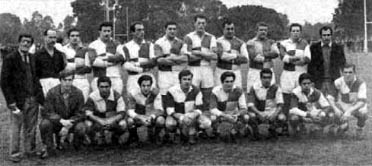
A team of 1969

The team was founded on August 28, 1928 and less than a year later it would join the Argentine Rugby Union to play at the third division, competing with 22 teams.

The club's name was chosen as a tribute to the Martín Fierro, the most renowned poem of the "Gauchesco" literature in Argentina. Martín Fierro (the character) is described by the author, José Hernández as a "matrero" ("smart", "clever" in English) gaucho. The election of the club name is also related to the place where it was founded: Morón (today a populous city of the Greater Buenos Aires) was an uninhabited land by the time and some battles for the independence had been fought there in the past.

In 2011 Los Matreros was relegated to second division after finishing 11th in Zona Reubicación.

== Titles ==
- URBA Primera A (1): 2025
