= Club Pucará =

Argentine sports club

(Argentina) Pucará
- Full name: Club Pucará
- Union: URBA
- Nickname: Rojo
- Founded: 12 October 1943; 83 years ago
- Location: Burzaco, Argentina
- Ground: Burzaco
- President: Carlos Ramón
- Coach: Mauro Bai
- League: Primera A
- 2026: 6th.
Team kit

Official website
- clubpucara.org

Club Pucará is an Argentine sports club based in the Burzaco district of Almirante Brown Partido in Greater Buenos Aires. Pucará is mostly known for its rugby union and women's field hockey teams. Other activities hosted by the club are cricket, gymnastics and swimming.

The rugby union team currently plays in Primera A, the second division of the Unión de Rugby de Buenos Aires league system.

== History ==
Club Pucará was founded in 1943 by young players that had left Gimnasia y Esgrima de Buenos Aires (GEBA) as a result of several disagreements with the managers of that club. Pucará was founded in the Burzaco district of the Greater Buenos Aires.

During the 1952 Ireland rugby union tour of South America, Pucará defeated the Ireland national rugby union team 11-6.

Since then, many Pucará players have gone on to be selected for the Argentina national team. Originally just a rugby club, Club Pucará has developed a competitive field hockey section in recent years.

=== Honours ===
- Torneo de la URBA (2): 1946, 1950
