= Torneo de la URBA =

Argentine rugby union tournament

Top 14
- Organiser(s): URBA (1996–Present); UAR (1899–1995)
- Founded: 1899; 127 years ago
- Region: Buenos Aires Province
- Teams: 14
- Qualifier for: Nacional de Clubes
- Related competitions: Torneo del Interior
- Current champions: Newman (2026)
- Most championships: C.A. San Isidro (33 titles)
- Broadcaster: ESPN
- Website: urba.org.ar/top-12
- 2026

The URBA Top 14 (formerly "Torneo de la URBA") is an Argentine rugby union club competition organised by the Buenos Aires Rugby Union (URBA). It is the top division of the Argentine rugby league system. Created on 10 April 1899 by the "River Plate Rugby Union" (current Argentine Rugby Union – UAR), it is the oldest rugby competition in South America and one of the oldest club competitions in the world.

Top 14 is one of the country's two main club competitions, along with Torneo del Interior, where clubs from the rest of the Provinces of Argentina take part. The championship runs from March to October.

Despite being from the city of Rosario in Santa Fe Province, Atlético del Rosario has taken part in Top 14 as founding member of the UAR. The other clubs from Rosario compete in tournaments organised by the Unión de Rugby de Rosario (URR), the governing body of that region.

== History ==
The River Plate Rugby Union was established in Buenos Aires on 10 April 1899, being its founding members Buenos Aires, Belgrano, Lomas and Flores from Buenos Aires, and Rosario A.C. from Rosario. The first president of the body was Leslie Corry Smith.

That same year, the RPRU organised the first edition of the Buenos Aires' inter-club competition, which inaugural winner team was Lomas. In 1931 the union name was translated into Spanish "Unión de Rugby del Río de la Plata", that remained until 1951 when the union took the definitive "Unión Argentina de Rugby" (UAR).

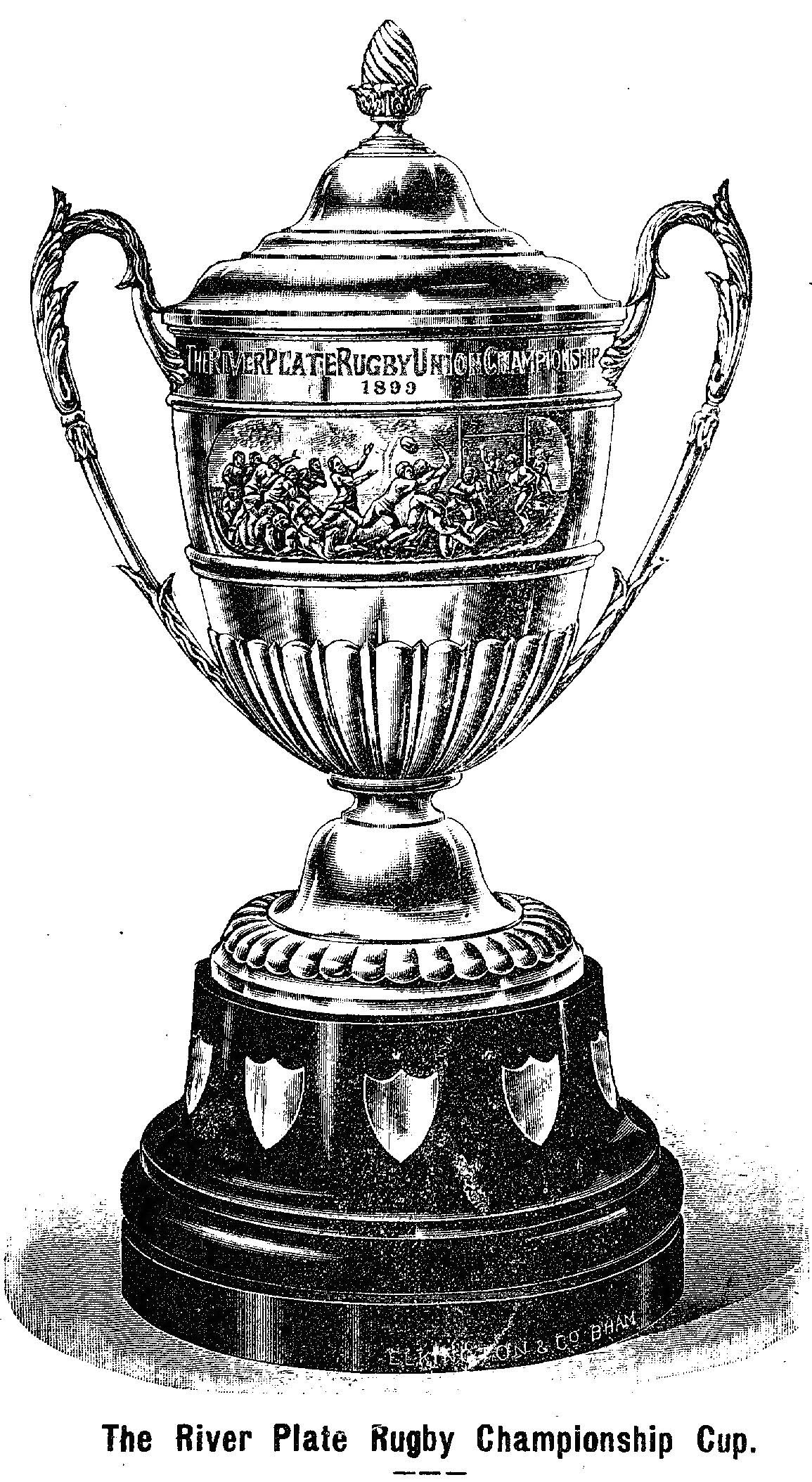
The first trophy awarded to the winning team. It debuted in 1899

The first trophy awarded to champions was acquired to British goldsmith Elkington & Son through their representatives in Argentina, C.R. Simons & Co., for a price of guinea 100. Built with Greek style, the trophy displayed a scene of a rugby match, with the legends "River Plate Rugby Union Championship" and "1899". The cup was mounted on an ebony base with little silver badges, where the name of the champion would be engraved year-by-year. Most of the money for its acquisition came from the Rosario A.C. members.

As a result of a reorganization of the UAR in 1995, the Unión de Rugby de Buenos Aires was created to take over the tournament, being named "Torneo de la URBA". From then on, the UAR focused only on national teams while the URBA took over club competitions.

Until 1997 a league system was used, if two or more clubs finished with the same number of points they would share the title. This happened several times, including in 1939 when a record 3 clubs had to share the title. To remedy this, a play-off system leading to a grand final was instaured in 1998. This new system has been in use since then, except in 2001.

In 1998, the URBA introduced the playoff system, with a final match in a neutral venue to determine a unique champion of the season. New changes to the rules were added in 2008, when the fourteen best placed teams at the end of the regular season were eligible to play a second stage, named "Top 14". Every club played each other only once in a single-robin championship (either home or away). At the end of this phase, the first 4 clubs qualified for the semi-finals of the tournament, with the first ranked team meeting the fourth and the second meeting the third. Both semi-finals took place on the same weekend on neutral ground (usually the Estadio del CASI). The winner was crowned URBA champion. This system has remained (with minor changes) since then. The rest of the clubs played in a promotion and relegation competition named "Torneo Reubicación".

Both the URBA winner and runner-up qualified for the Nacional de Clubes semi-finals, where they met the winner and runner-up of Torneo del Interior. The winner of that competition was declared Argentine champion.

In 2016, the URBA introduced changes in the tournament's format for the 2017 season, with the "Top 14" being reduced to 12 teams (therefore renamed "Top 12") and becoming an independent championship, with all of the teams playing each other in a double round-robin tournament (home and away games).

As a result of those changes, the Buenos Aires league system was divided into six tiers. The new format also stated that the four best placed teams at the end of the season, would play the semifinals while the two worst placed would be relegated to the second division.

The tournament returned to a 14 teams format in 2026.

== Format ==
The 2026 tournament will start on 14 March, with the 14 participant teams playing each other in a double round-robin tournament, which will end on 17 October. The four best placed clubs will qualify to the semifinals (played as single matches in neutral venues) on 31 October. Winners will play the final (also a single match) at Estadio del CASI, frequent venue for URBA finals, on 7 November 2026.

The seven best placed teams in the general table will qualify for Torneo Nacional de Clubes, the main competition of Argentine rugby, which is made up of 9 teams from the rest of the provinces of Argentina and the seven from URBA.

== Clubs ==
=== Former clubs ===
Disaffiliated or defunct clubs:

Club	Field	Estab.	Years	Titles	Fate
Flores A.C.	Caballito	1893	1899	–	Dissolved in 1907
Buenos Aires F.C.	Palermo	1886	1899–1951	8	Merged with Buenos Aires Cricket Club in 1951

== Champions ==
The complete list of champions is detailed below:

Tournament names

- 1899–1995: "River Plate Rugby Union Championship"
- 1996–2007: "Torneo de la URBA"
- 2008–2016, 2026–: "Top 14"
- 2017–2021, 2023–25: "Top 12"
- 2022: "Top 13"

Tournament format

- 1899–1997, 2001: the team with most points earned was declared champion
- 1998–2000, 2002–present: final match to decide a champion

Key

- a.e.t.: match went to extra time
- a.e.t.s.d.: match went to extra time via sudden death method

=== List of champions ===
Ed.	Seas.	Champion/s	Score	Runner-up	Venue	City	Ref.
1	1899	Lomas (1)	3–0	Atlético del Rosario	Flores Old Ground	Buenos Aires	
2	1900	Buenos Aires FC (Note: Rugby union club founded in 1886. It merged to Buenos Aires Cricket Club in 1951, also becoming the rugby section of that institution.) (1)	n/a (Note: No information whether the championship was defined on points or with a final, as the UAR have not published the annual reports on its website.)				
3	1901	Buenos Aires FC (2)	n/a				
4	1902	Buenos Aires FC (3)	n/a				
5	1903	Buenos Aires FC (4)	n/a				
6	1904	Buenos Aires FC (5)	n/a				
7	1905	Atlético del Rosario (1)	n/a				
8	1906	Atlético del Rosario (2)	n/a				
9	1907	Belgrano (1)	n/a				
10	1908	Buenos Aires FC (6)	n/a				
11	1909	Buenos Aires FC (7)	n/a				
12	1910	Belgrano (2)	n/a				
13	1911	Gimnasia y Esgrima (BA) (1)	n/a				
14	1912	Gimnasia y Esgrima (BA) (2)	n/a				
15	1913	Lomas (2)	n/a				
16	1914	Belgrano (3)	n/a				
17	1915	Buenos Aires FC (8)	n/a				
18	1916	(No championship held)					
19	1917	CA San Isidro (1)	n/a				
20	1918	CA San Isidro (2)	n/a				
21	1919	(No championship held)					
22	1920	CA San Isidro (3)	n/a				
23	1921	CA San Isidro (4) (Note: Title shared.)	– (Note: Played under a round-robin basis and defined on points.)				
23	1921	Belgrano (4)	–				
24	1922	CA San Isidro (5)	n/a				
25	1923	CA San Isidro (6)	–				
26	1924	CA San Isidro (7)	n/a				
27	1925	CA San Isidro (8)	–				
28	1926	CA San Isidro (9)	n/a				
29	1927	CA San Isidro (10)	–				
30	1928	CA San Isidro (11)	n/a				
31	1929	CA San Isidro (12)	–				
32	1930	CA San Isidro (13)	n/a				
33	1931	CUBA (1)	–				
34	1932	Gimnasia y Esgrima (BA) (3)	n/a				
35	1933	CA San Isidro (14)	n/a				
36	1934	CA San Isidro (15)	n/a				
37	1935	Atlético del Rosario (3)	–				
38	1936	Belgrano (5)	n/a				
39	1937	Old Georgian (1)	–				
40	1938	Old Georgian (2)	n/a				
41	1939	Old Georgian (3)	–				
41	1939	Gimnasia y Esgrima (BA) (4)	–				
41	1939	San Isidro Club (1)	–				
42	1940	Belgrano (6)	–				
42	1940	Olivos (1)	–				
43	1941	San Isidro Club (2)	–				
44	1942	CUBA (2)	–				
45	1943	CA San Isidro (16)	–				
46	1944	CUBA (3)	–				
47	1945	CUBA (4)	–				
48	1946	Pucará (1)	–				
49	1947	CUBA (5)	–				
50	1948	San Isidro Club (3)	–				
51	1949	CA San Isidro (17)	–				
51	1949	CUBA (6)	–				
52	1950	CUBA (7)	–				
52	1950	Pucará (2)	–				
53	1951	CUBA (8)	–				
54	1952	CUBA (9)	–				
55	1953	Obras Sanitarias (1)	–				
56	1954	CA San Isidro (18)	–				
57	1955	CA San Isidro (19)	–				
58	1956	CA San Isidro (20)	–				
59	1957	CA San Isidro (21)	–				
60	1958	Buenos Aires CRC (1) (Note: The rugby section of the Buenos Aires Cricket Club is the former Buenos Aires F.C. team that merged to the institution in 1951.)	–				
61	1959	Buenos Aires CRC (2)	–				
62	1960	CA San Isidro (22)	–				
63	1961	CA San Isidro (23)	–				
64	1962	CA San Isidro (24)	–				
65	1963	Belgrano (7)	–				
66	1964	CA San Isidro (25)	–				
67	1965	CUBA (10)	–				
68	1966	Belgrano (8)	–				
69	1967	Belgrano (9)	–				
69	1967	CA San Isidro (26)	–				
70	1968	Belgrano (10)	–				
70	1968	CUBA (11)	–				
71	1969	CUBA (12)	–				
72	1970	San Isidro Club (4)	–				
72	1970	CUBA (13)	–				
73	1971	San Isidro Club (5)	–				
74	1972	San Isidro Club (6)	–				
75	1973	San Isidro Club (7)	–				
76	1974	CA San Isidro (27)	–				
77	1975	CA San Isidro (28)	–				
78	1976	CA San Isidro (29)	–				
79	1977	San Isidro Club (8)	–				
80	1978	San Isidro Club (9)	–				
81	1979	San Isidro Club (10)	–				
82	1980	San Isidro Club (11)	–				
83	1981	CA San Isidro (30)	–				
84	1982	CA San Isidro (31)	–				
85	1983	San Isidro Club (12)	–				
86	1984	San Isidro Club (13)	–				
87	1985	CA San Isidro (32)	–				
88	1986	San Isidro Club (14)	–				
88	1986	Banco Nación (1)	–				
89	1987	San Isidro Club (15)	–				
90	1988	San Isidro Club (16)	–				
91	1989	Alumni (1)	–				
91	1989	Banco Nación (2)	–				
92	1990	Alumni (2)	–				
93	1991	Alumni (3)	–				
94	1992	Alumni (4)	–				
95	1993	San Isidro Club (17)	–				
96	1994	San Isidro Club (18)	–				
97	1995	La Plata (1)	–				
98	1996	Hindú (1)	–				
98	1996	Atlético del Rosario (4)	–				
99	1997	San Isidro Club (19)	–				
100	1998	Hindú (2)	38–12	San Isidro Club	BACRC Stadium	Los Polvorines	
101	1999	San Isidro Club (20)	14–9	Atlético del Rosario	BACRC Stadium	Los Polvorines	
102	2000	Atlético del Rosario (5)	35–32 (a.s.d.e.t.)	CA San Isidro	BACRC Stadium	Los Polvorines	
103	2001	Alumni (5)	–				
104	2002	San Isidro Club (21)	16–10	Regatas	BACRC Stadium	Los Polvorines	
105	2003	San Isidro Club (22)	20–9	CA San Isidro	BACRC Stadium	Los Polvorines	
106	2004	San Isidro Club (23)	36–16	Alumni	BACRC Stadium	Los Polvorines	
107	2005	CA San Isidro (33)	18–17	San Isidro Club	BACRC Stadium	Los Polvorines	
108	2006	Hindú (3)	20–5	Alumni	Newman Stadium	Benavídez	
109	2007	Hindú (4)	9–6	Alumni	Ferro Carril Oeste	Buenos Aires	
110	2008	Hindú (5)	22–10	Newman	Estadio del CASI	San Isidro	
111	2009	Hindú (6)	31–22	CA San Isidro	Estadio del CASI	San Isidro	
112	2010	San Isidro Club (24)	30–22	La Plata	La Plata RC	Manuel Gonnet	
113	2011	San Isidro Club (25)	14–11	Alumni	La Plata RC	Manuel Gonnet	
114	2012	Hindú (7)	15–9	La Plata	La Plata RC	Manuel Gonnet	
115	2013	CUBA (14)	11–9	Hindú	Estadio del CASI	San Isidro	
116	2014	Hindú (8)	29–17	CUBA	Estadio del CASI	San Isidro	
117	2015	Hindú (9)	24–0	CUBA	La Plata RC	Manuel Gonnet	
118	2016	Belgrano (11)	25–10	Hindú	Estadio del CASI	San Isidro	
119	2017	Hindú (10)	27–20	Alumni	Estadio del CASI	San Isidro	
120	2018	Alumni (6)	26–17	Hindú	Estadio del CASI	San Isidro	
121	2019	San Isidro Club (26)	22–19 (a.s.d.e.t.)	Belgrano	Estadio del CASI	San Isidro	
–	2020	(not held because of the COVID-19 pandemic)					
122	2021	CUBA (15)	10–9	San Isidro Club	Estadio del CASI	San Isidro	
123	2022	Hindú (11)	30–25	San Isidro Club	Estadio del CASI	San Isidro	
124	2023	San Isidro Club (27)	15–12	Alumni	Estadio del CASI	San Isidro	
125	2024	Alumni (7)	20–17 (a.s.d.e.t.)	Belgrano	Estadio del CASI	San Isidro	
126	2025	Newman (1)	15–3	San Isidro Club	Estadio del CASI	San Isidro	
127	2026	Newman (2)	33–32	Hindú	Estadio del CASI	San Isidro	.

== Titles by club ==
Team	Titles	Years won
CA San Isidro	33	1917, 1918, 1920, 1921, 1922, 1923, 1924, 1925, 1926, 1927, 1928, 1929, 1930, 1933, 1934, 1943, 1949, 1954, 1955, 1956, 1957, 1960, 1961, 1962, 1964, 1967, 1974, 1975, 1976, 1981, 1982, 1985, 2005
San Isidro Club	27	1939, 1941, 1948, 1970, 1971, 1972, 1973, 1977, 1978, 1979, 1980, 1983, 1984, 1986, 1987, 1988, 1993, 1994, 1997, 1999, 2002, 2003, 2004, 2010, 2011, 2019, 2023
CUBA	15	1931, 1942, 1944, 1945, 1947, 1949, 1950, 1951, 1952, 1965, 1968, 1969, 1970, 2013, 2021
Belgrano A.C.	11	1907, 1910, 1914, 1921, 1936, 1940, 1963, 1966, 1967, 1968, 2016
Hindú	11	1996, 1998, 2006, 2007, 2008, 2009, 2012, 2014, 2015, 2017, 2022
Buenos Aires F.C. (Note: The club merged to Buenos Aires CRC in 1951.)	8	1900, 1901, 1902, 1903, 1904, 1908, 1909, 1915
Alumni	7	1989, 1990, 1991, 1992, 2001, 2018, 2024
Atlético del Rosario	5	1905, 1906, 1935, 1996, 2000
Gimnasia y Esgrima (BA)	4	1911, 1912, 1932, 1939
Old Georgian	3	1937, 1938, 1939
Lomas	2	1899, 1913
Pucará	2	1946, 1950
Buenos Aires CRC (Note: Buenos Aires CRC usually counts the titles won by the BAFC as their own, after both clubs merged in 1951.)	2	1958, 1959
Banco Nación	2	1986, 1989
Newman	2	2025, 2026
Olivos	1	1940
Obras Sanitarias	1	1953
La Plata	1	1995

== Broadcasters Rights ==
The exclusive rights of Torneo de la URBA are broadcast live on ESPN Extra Saturday at 13:15 and are broadcast delayed on ESPN 2 at 17:30. In the Scrum are broadcast highlights of match Saturday at 23:00 (local time of Argentina, Paraguay and Uruguay), 22:00 (local time of Chile) and 21:00 (local time of Peru).
