= Argentine Rugby Union =

Governing body for rugby union in Argentina

Unión Argentina de Rugby
- Sport: Rugby union
- Founded: 10 April 1899; 127 years ago (as "River Plate Rugby Union")
- World Rugby affiliation: 1987
- Sudamérica Rugby affiliation: 1988
- President: Gabriel Travaglini
- Men's coach: Felipe Contepomi
- Website: uar.com.ar

The Argentine Rugby Union (Spanish: Unión Argentina de Rugby, abbreviated "UAR") is the governing body for rugby union in Argentina. It is a member of World Rugby, with a seat on that body's Executive Council, and a founding member of Sudamérica Rugby.

The UAR organises all the national teams, including Senior (Pumas), U-20 (Pumitas), Argentina XV, Sevens and Women's squads and the franchise Jaguares that participated in SANZAAR's Super Rugby competition.

== History ==
=== Origins ===
The first rugby match in Argentina was played in 1873, in the Buenos Aires Cricket Club Ground sited in Palermo, Buenos Aires. Only 24 players (all of them were English) could meet to contest the match. The teams were named Bancos ("Banks" in Spanish) and Ciudad ("City") and formed with 11 and 13 players respectively.

That same year, another match was played on the Polo Field of Flores AC, part of land owned by the Unzué family. The teams were called Inglaterra ("England") and El Mundo ("The World"). The first team was formed by Royal Navy officers that were temporarily in Buenos Aires, with the addition of some English citizens who resided in Argentina. Its rival was formed by English, Scottish, Welsh and Irish people plus some Argentine-born players of English descent.

On May 14, 1874, the Rugby Football Union rules were adopted to play rugby in Argentina. Those rules were used for the first time during the match contested at Buenos Aires Cricket Club between two teams from that institution. The teams were called El bando del Sr. Trench ("Mr. Trench's side"), and El bando del Sr. Hogg ("Mr. Hogg's side").

Nevertheless, other sources say that the first game under the rules of rugby was played on Thursday, 14 May 1874, at David Mathven's country house, in Caballito, Buenos Aires. Buenos Aires FC also played the first inter-provincial rugby game in Argentina, when it faced Rosario AC in the city of Rosario, on 28 June 1886.

=== First championship organized ===
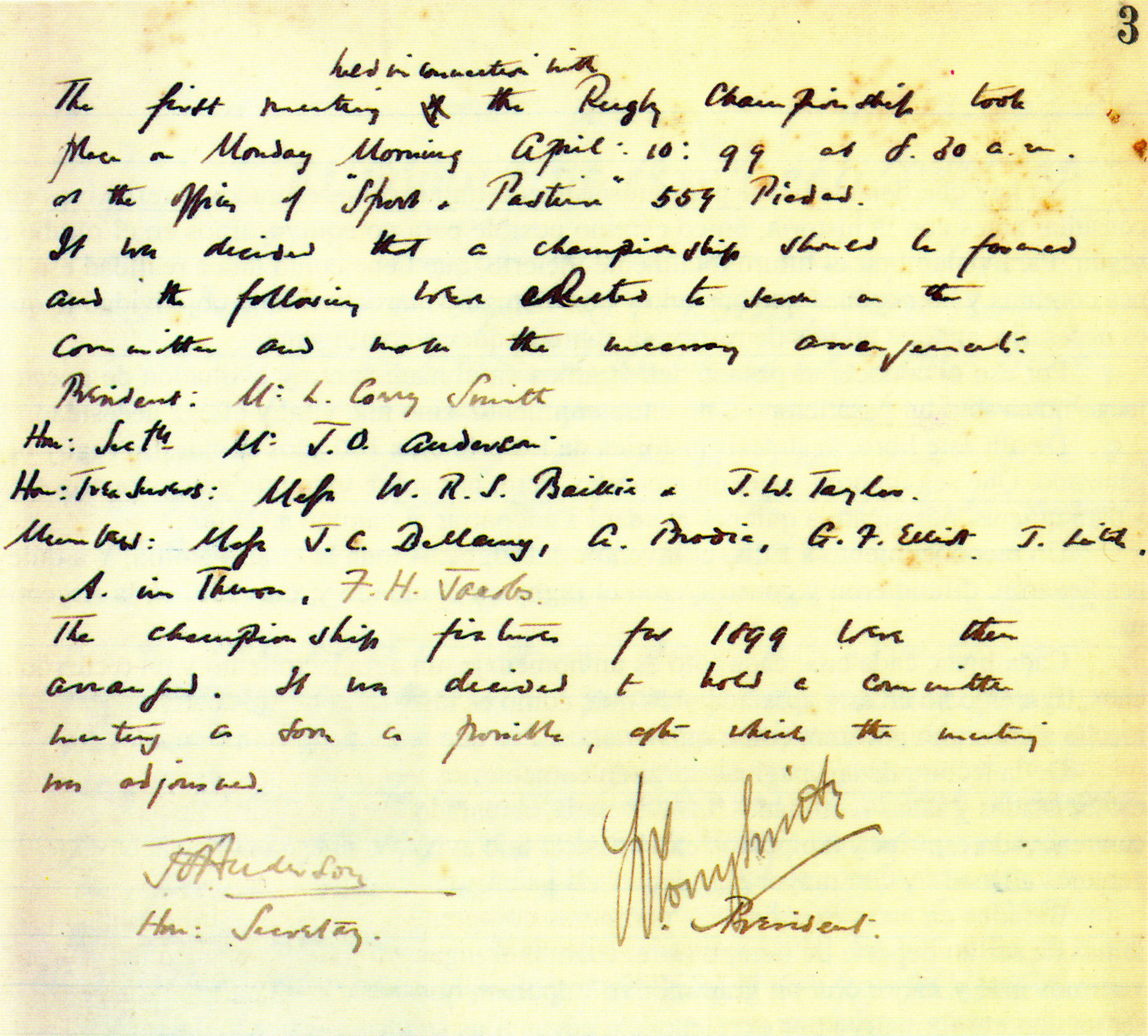
Act of foundation of the "River Plate Rugby Union", 10 April 1899

In 1899, clubs Belgrano, Rosario, Lomas, Buenos Aires and Flores founded the "River Plate Rugby Union", naming Leslie William Corry-Smith as president. The body organized the first championship that same year, played by the five founding members. In the inaugural game, Lomas defeated Buenos Aires by 11–4. Lomas would be the first Argentine champion, winning the title at the end of the season.

The sport requested affiliation with the International Olympic Committee (COI), who advised them to add Argentina to their name and so they became the "Unión Argentina de Rugby" on 29 November 1951.

This body, one of the oldest rugby unions in the world, became a member of the International Rugby Board (IRB) after being invited to the inaugural Rugby World Cup in 1987.

When the rest of the rugby union world went professional in 1995, the UAR decided to keep the game amateur. Also, the Buenos Aires clubs split off the UAR and formed the Unión de Rugby de Buenos Aires (URBA), which has the same status as other provincial unions.

Argentine players who opt to go overseas to play professionally (historically in Italy and France, with an increasing number today playing in England) remain eligible for national team selection (although this was not originally the case). As a result, the national team was heavily, though not exclusively, made up of European-based players. In 2016, the UAR formed the Jaguares team to compete in the Super Rugby competition. Also, it established a policy of selecting Pumas players from Super Rugby teams only, thereby excluding players from European clubs.

=== National team ===
The first national team (under the name "The River Plate Rugby Football Union") made its debut against the British Lions (named "Combined British") when they toured Argentina in 1910 as part of the celebrations for the 100th anniversary of the Revolución de Mayo. The match was played on 12 June and the Argentina side lost 28–3.

=== The Rugby Championship ===
Argentina officially joined The Rugby Championship following a meeting in Buenos Aires on November 23, 2011. They became a full member of SANZAAR, the body which operates Super Rugby and The Rugby Championship competitions in rugby union, from the start of 2016.

== Names ==
The Union had different names over the years. Them are detailed below:

- River Plate Rugby Union (1899–1931)
- Unión de Rugby del Río de la Plata (1931–51)
- Unión Argentina de Rugby (1951–present)

== Structure ==
Regional Unions affiliated to Unión Argentina:

Union	Region	Established	Notes
Alto Valle del Rio Negro y Neuquén	Neuquén, Río Negro	1959	
Andina	La Rioja, Catamarca	2009	
Austral	Chubut, Río Negro	1971	
Buenos Aires	Greater Buenos Aires	1995	Originally, Buenos Aires clubs were UAR direct affiliates
Valle de Chubut	Chubut	1971	
Córdoba	Córdoba	1931	
Cuyo	Mendoza	1945	
Entre Ríos	Entre Ríos	1979	Was part of the Unión de Rugby de Rosario until 1980.
Formosa	Formosa	1988	
Jujuy	Jujuy	1966	
Lagos del Sur	Bariloche	2001	Also includes some regions of Río Negro, Chubut and Neuquén Provinces.
Mar del Plata	Mar del Plata	1951	Also includes teams of Tandil.
Misiones	Misiones	1977	
Nordeste	Chaco, Corrientes	1963	
Oeste de Buenos Aires	Buenos Aires, La Pampa	1986	
Rosario	Rosario, Córdoba	1928	
Salta	Salta	1958	
San Luis	San Luis	2003	
San Juan	San Juan	1952	Founded after separating from Unión de Cuyo.
Santa Cruz	Santa Cruz	2008	Includes some clubs from Chile.
Santa Fe	Santa Fe	1955	Separated from the Unión de Rugby del Litoral (today UR Rosario) in 1955, initially with clubs from Entre Ríos affiliated.
Santiago del Estero	Santiago del Estero	1968	
Sur	Buenos Aires, La Pampa, Viedma	1954	
Tierra del Fuego	Tierra del Fuego, Argentine Antarctica	2000	
Tucumán	Tucumán	1944	Originally part of Unión de Rugby del Norte.

== Ranking ==
Argentina's world rugby ranking

Source: World Rugby - Updated to 06/30/2008

== See also ==
- Argentina national rugby union team
- Jaguares (Argentina XV)
- Jaguares (Super Rugby)
- Pampas XV
- Cultural significance of the jaguar in South America
