= La Plata Rugby Club =

La Plata
- Full name: La Plata Rugby Club
- Union: URBA
- Nickname: Canario
- Founded: 20 March 1934; 92 years ago
- Location: Manuel B. Gonnet, Argentina
- Ground(s): El Bosque, Manuel B. Gonnet (Capacity: 3,000)
- President: Juan Manuel Roán
- Coach: Benjamin Tomageli
- League: Top 14
- 2026: 11th.
1st kit	2nd kit

Official website
- laplatarugbyclub.com.ar

La Plata Rugby Club is an Argentine amateur sports club headquartered in Manuel B. Gonnet, a city in La Plata Partido. The club is mostly known for its rugby union team, which currently plays in Primera A, the first division of the URBA league system.

The club has also a women's rugby team competing in "Torneo Femenino", organized by the same body. As of 2022, the club had 2,500 members. Apart from rugby, the club's facility in Gonnet has tennis courts.

== History ==
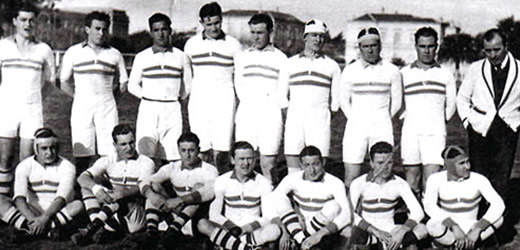
Rugby team of Club Gimnasia y Esgrima LP, predecessor to La Plata RC, posing in 1924

Roots to the creation of La Plata RC can be traced to Club Gimnasia y Esgrima, one of the two main clubs in La Plata. Members of the rowing section of the club wanted to practise a sport that allowed them to stay fit during the winter period. After a visit of players of Club Atlético San Isidro, rugby was chosen. The rugby section of GELP La Plata officially opened and affiliated to Argentine Rugby Union (UAR) in 1925.

GELP played their first official match in June 1925, being defeated by their counterpart from Buenos Aires 0–34. Six month later, GELP achieved their first win vs Deportiva Francesa 9–6. In 1929 the team promoted to the second division after a great campaign where they remained unbeaten with 28 wins and one draw.

When football became professional in Argentina in 1931, the UAR summoned GELP to disaffiliate following the rule that stated all clubs registered to UAR could not have any professional team. After GELP quit the UAR, their players decided to establish a new amateur club so "Gimnasia y Esgrima La Plata Rugby Club" was founded on 20 March 1934. Nevertheless, four years later the UAR demanded GELPRC a name change so the club renamed "La Plata Rugby Club". That same year the squad lost the final to Young Man Christian Association 3–5. In recognition to the good campaign made by the team, the UAR invited them to participate in the 1939 Primera División championship.

The recently created club adopted the yellow and navy colors, which earned them the nickname canarios (canaries).

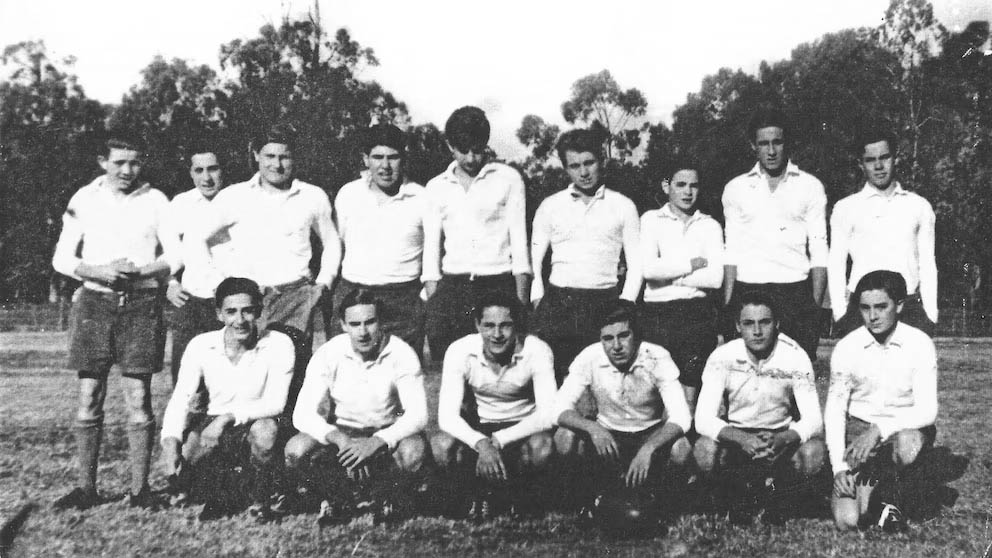
U19 team of La Plata in 1965

The club settle down in El Bosque of La Plata from 1942 to 1964, when it moved to Manuel B. Gonnet. During the 1940s, La Plata played in segunda, and in 1953 the team promoted to the top division. The club finished its move to Gonnet in 1970, and the deed were signed in 1979.

In 1979 La Plata promoted to the first division, when in the penultimate round the team faced La Salle.

La Plata won their first senior title in 1995 when the squad secured the title after defeating Olivos 51–17, three rounds before the season ended. That achievement positioned La Plata as the first (and only to date) team of the city to win an URBA title. The team had an average of 30 points per game, with only two loses in the season. Nicha Albarracín was the coach.

The first national title came in 2007, when La Plata won the Nacional de Clubes after defeating Tucumán Rugby Club 32–13. It was the second final contested by La Plata so in 1995 they had lost to CASI 19–6. Wing Esteban Durante was the top scorer of the match with 22 points. La Plata starting line-up was Álvaro Herrera; Augusto Ramos, Nicolás Ramos, Antonio Mazzoni, Esteban Durante; Juan Luis Rojas, Francisco Albarracín; Juan Pablo Mirenda, Gonzalo Oviedo, Valentín Telleriarte (c); José Manuel Roan, Tomás Roan; Sebastián Rondinelli, Horacio Gómez Smith, Juan Dalla Salda. The team was coached by Hugo Montenegro, Martín Manuele, and Carlos Pereyra.

La Plata was also finalist in 2008, but lost to San Isidro Club 33–8.

In 2019, La Plata was relegated after finishing 11th. in the Top 12 championship. The team won 7 matches and had 15 loses, scoring 543 points and conceding 699.

== Enforced disappearances ==
During the military dictatorship named "National Reorganization Process", a total of 20 players of La Plata were disappeared. Some of them were Rodolfo Axat (whose father was one of the founders of the club), Santiago Sánchez Viamonte, Hernán Rocca (the first victim killed). Eduardo Jáuregui (nephew of Néstor Jáuregui, part of the team that promoted in 1929), Julio Álvarez (the last victim). The rest of players dead and disappeared include Otilio Pascua, Pablo Balut, Mariano Montequín, Jorge Moura, Luis Munitis Orione, Mario Mercader, Enrique Sierra, Abel Vigo, Alfredo Reboredo, Eduardo Merbilhaá, Alejandro García Martegani, Marcelo Bettini, Pablo Del Rivero, Abigail Attademo, and Hugo Lavalle.

In 2015, the book "Maten al rugbier: la historia de los 20 desaparecidos de La Plata Rugby Club was published. It included interview to relatives, friends, and teammates of the 20 players. The book stated that rugby, with 151 cases, was the sport with the most disappearances in Argentina (70% out of total). It also revealed that 18 out of 20 players were students of the National University of La Plata, one of the schools with the most political activists in the country.

In March 2006 (the 30th anniversary of the 1976 Argentine coup d'état), a plaque was placed in the club to honor the memory of the 20 players (although by then, only 17 were included so the final number was revealed years later). In an interview conducted in 2022 to some of the disappeared players' teammates and relatives, they revealed that the younger players were leftwing activists, while the senior players were involved in the Justicialist Youth, and players from Buenos Aires used to called them "a seedbreed for extremists", and "montoneros". According to their testimonies, La Plata executives never opposed to their activism.

== Titles ==
- Nacional de Clubes (1): 2007
- Torneo de la URBA (1): 1995
