= Estadio del CASI =

Rugby union stadium in San Isidro, Argentina

CASI Stadium
- Estadio del CASI
- La Catedral

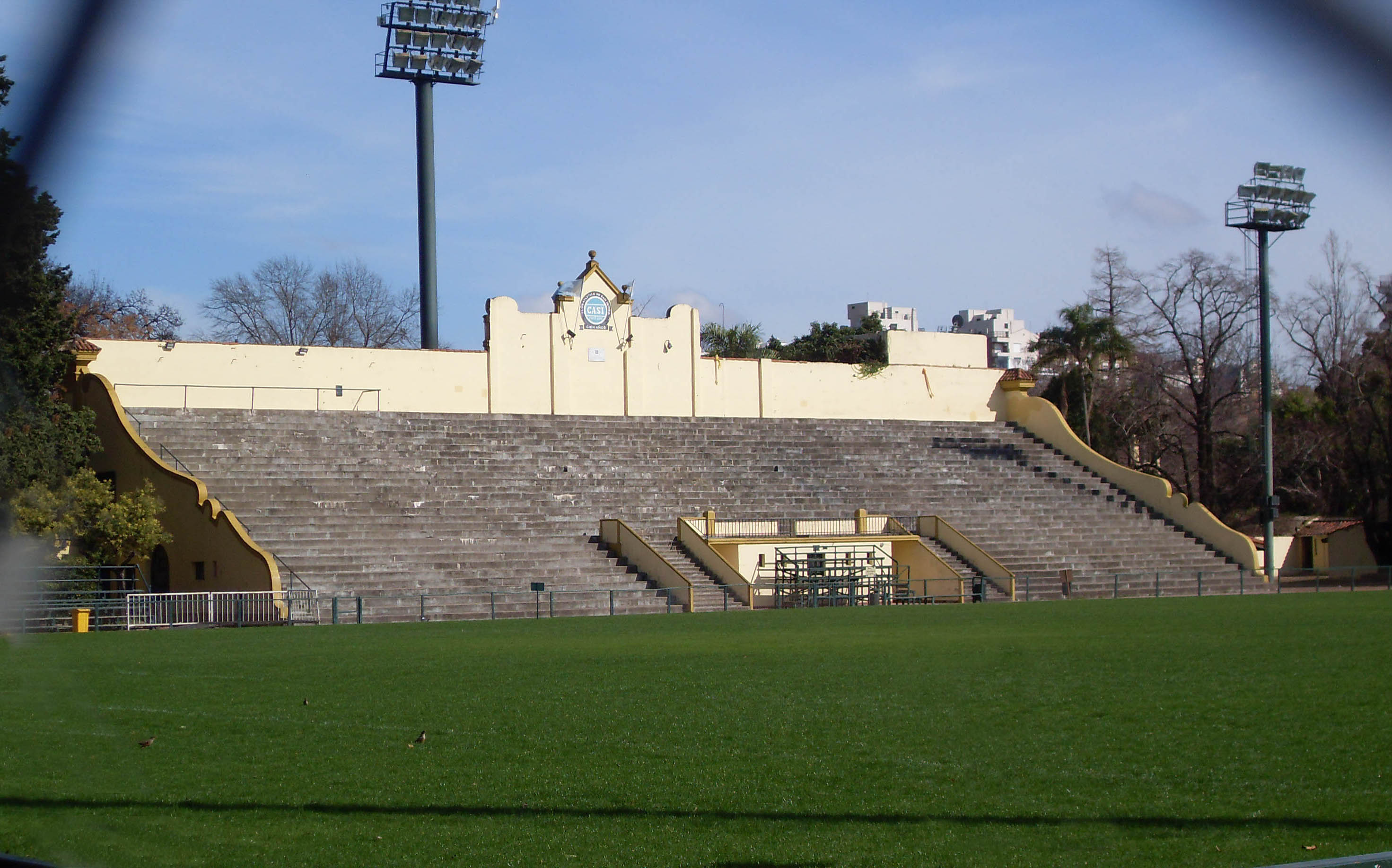
- View of the stadium's grandstand in 2015
- Interactive map of CASI Stadium
- Full name: Cancha Nro. 1 de Rugby del Club Atlético San Isidro
- Address: Roque Sáenz Peña 499; San Isidro; Argentina
- Coordinates: 34.4736°S 58.5060°W
- Owner: Club Atlético San Isidro
- Operator: Club Atlético San Isidro; URBA
- Capacity: 4,500
- Type: Stadium
- Surface: Grass
- Current use: Rugby union

Construction
- Opened: 1902; 124 years ago

Tenants
- CASI teams: football (1902–30); rugby (1908–11, 1917–present); Nacional de Clubes finals (1998, 2017); URBA Top 12 finals (2008–present); Pampas XV (2023–present)

The Estadio del Club Atlético San Isidro (officially Cancha No. 1 de Rugby), nicknamed La Catedral, is a rugby union stadium in downtown San Isidro in the homonymous partido of Greater Buenos Aires, Argentina. It is owned and operated by Club Atlético San Isidro being the home venue to the club's rugby senior team.

The stadium, with capacity for 4,500 spectactors, has been the venue for the URBA Top 12 finals since 2008 under the playoffs system established by the Unión de Rugby de Buenos Aires in 1998. For matches of this kind, temporary tubular stands are added, increasing its capacity to 10,000.

CASI's is one of the oldest sports venues in Argentina so the club has always been on the same site since 1902, when Manuel Aguirre, owner of a large chacra on Sánez Peña street, gave the club a portion to settle down there.

== History ==
As CASI was founded in October 1902 as a football club, the institution soon affiliated to the Argentine Football Association (AFA) debuting the Segunda División tournament in 1903. San Isidro played their home matches in the venue, which was built on a land ceded by neighbor Manuel Aguirre, owner of a large chacra on Sánez Peña street, where the club settled down.

In 1908, C.A. San Isidro formed its first rugby team, combining British-origin employees of the Central Argentine Railway and a few Argentine-born, but it was dissolved in 1911 without having participated in any competition. Six years later, and due to an initiative by club president Rafael Cullen, San Isidro established a new rugby team, registering with the River Plate Rugby Union that same year. Besides, the stadium became CASI's home venue for rugby as well.

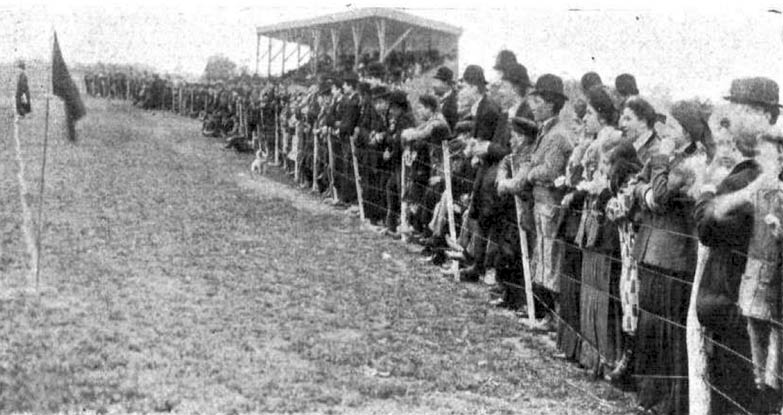
People attending a football match at the stadium in 1908. It did not have stands by then

CASI expanded its stadium in 1912, when the club placed a roof stand, which had been bought to Club Banco Nación. which field was in the neighborhood of Colegiales, Buenos Aires. Defunct club Alumni played there in 1909. That same year, the stadium held its first notable match, the 1912 Copa de Competencia Jockey Club final, contested by San Isidro and Quilmes. As the match ended 0–0 (after extra time), the playoff was held in Estadio Guido y Sarmiento, Quilmes' venue. It was the only CASI's final played there so the team played their other finals (such as Rioplatense Tie Cup finals of 1911, 1912, and 1913) at Estadio Racing Club in Avellaneda.

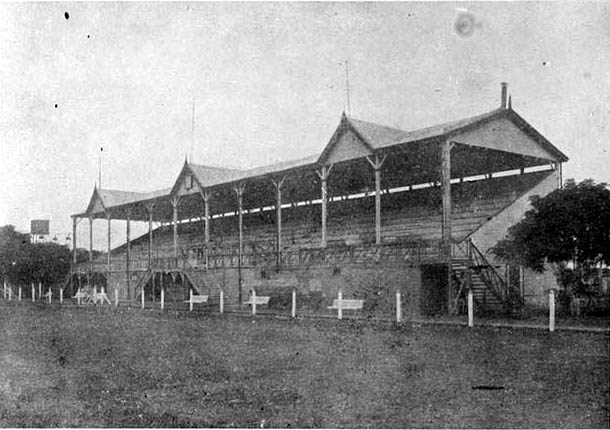
The stadium with its wooden grandstand in 1922

The stadium was CASI's home venue during the club's years in Primera División (since its debut in 1906 to its last season in 1930). When CASI disaffiliated from the association in May 1931 after football became a professional sport in Argentina, the stadium finished its tenure as football venue, at least for official matches so the practise of the sport was never abandoned by the institution.

The wooden grandstand was destroyed by fire in 1927, being replaced by a concrete structure.

In 1998, the stadium hosted the Nacional de Clubes final where San Cirano and San Luis drew 22–22, both crowning champions. La Catedral hosted its second final in June 2017, when Hindú defeated Tala 20–10 to win their third consecutive national title.

The stadium hosted its first Torneo de la URBA final in 2008, when Hindú defeated Newman 22–10 to win their 5th. league title. Since then, Estadio del CASI has been a frequent venue for URBA finals.

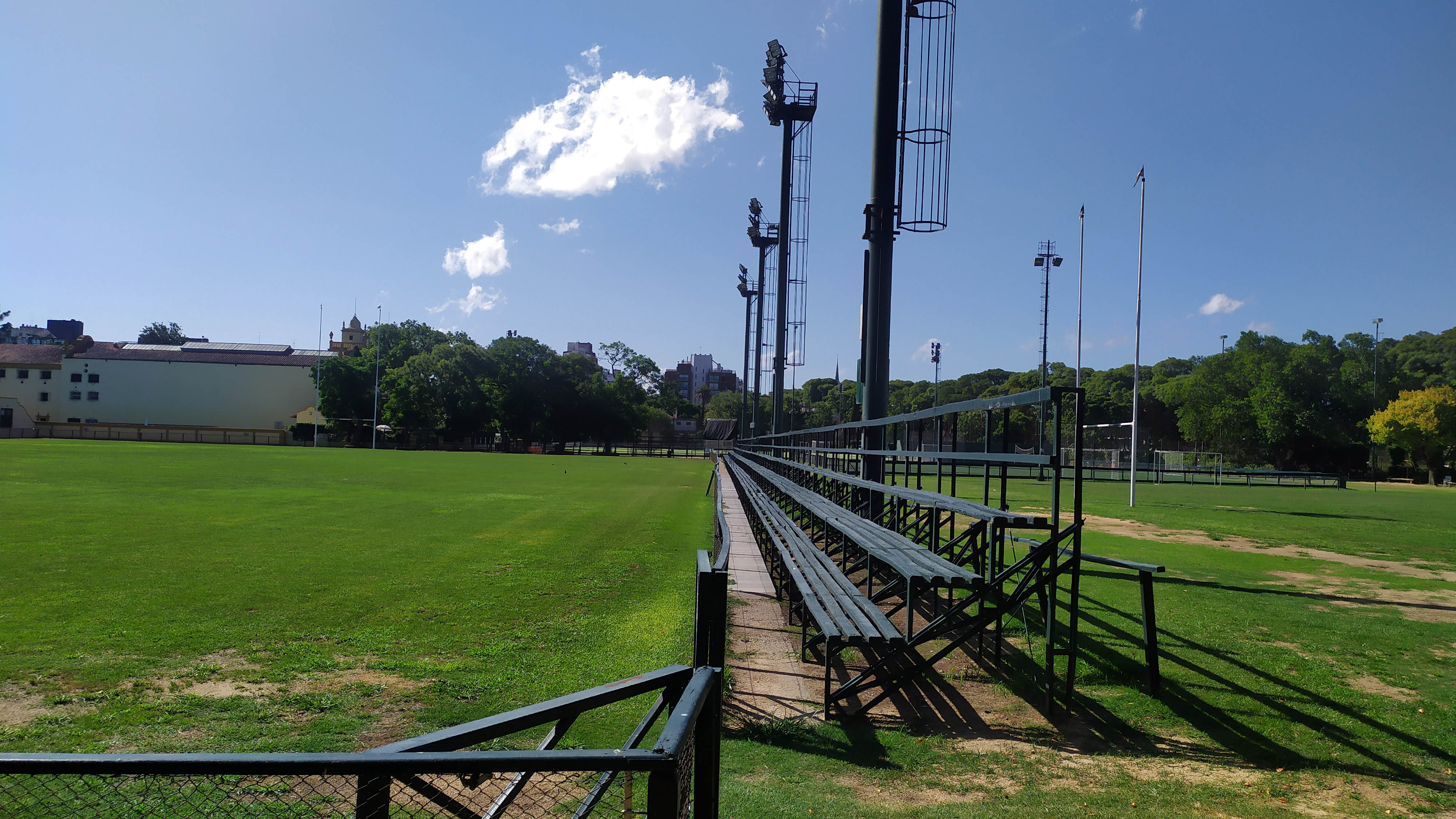
View of the stadium (from south) in 2026

In 2015, CASI announced its stadium would serve as home venue to Super Rugby Argentine franchise (later revealed to be Jaguares) after an agreement with the UAR, owner of the franchise. The deal would be into force from the 2016 to the 2020 season. The club also stated that the stadium's capacity could be increased (adding tubular structures) to 10,000 spectators during the competition. Despite the announcement, Jaguares played their home games at Vélez Sarsfield's venue, José Amalfitani Stadium, during the five years they participated in the competition.

Since 2023, CASI Stadium has been the home venue to Super Rugby Americas franchise Pampas XV, which debuted in the tournament that same year.

== Nickname ==
The stadium is nicknamed La Catedral ("the Cathedral of rugby"), earned due to it is distant 500 mts from the San Isidro Cathedral, a historic landmark since 1963.

== Facilities ==
The stadium has a lighting system for night matches
