= Club Newman =

Argentine sports club (mainly rugby union)

(Argentina) Newman
- Full name: Club Newman
- Union: URBA
- Nickname(s): Cardenal, Bordó
- Founded: 15 December 1975; 50 years ago
- Location: Benavídez, Tigre Partido, Argentina
- Ground: Brother Timothy O'Brien
- President: Joaquín Ibañez
- Coach: Santiago Piccaluga
- League: Top 14
- 2026: 1st. (champion via playoffs)
Team kit

Official website
- clubnewman.com.ar

Club Newman is an Argentine amateur sports club located in the city of Benavídez of Tigre Partido, Greater Buenos Aires. The club is mostly known for its rugby union team, which currently plays in the Top 12, the first division of the Unión de Rugby de Buenos Aires league system.

Newman's facilities also host other sports such as field hockey, football, golf, paddle tennis, show jumping, squash, and tennis.

== History ==
The club was founded on December 15, 1975, by alumni of Cardinal Newman College. The first facilities were located in Benavidez, a district in Tigre Partido. The college had been established by the order of the Christian Brothers.

In 2004, the rugby team of the club reached the Torneo de la URBA semi-finals (where they lost to Alumni), one of its most important achievements until then. In 2008, Newman reached the URBA Top 14 final. In 2012 they reached semi-finals and in 2013 too. Also, they managed to get to other to finals in the Nacional de Clubes, one in 2014 and the last one in 2018. Most of Newman's members are former students of the homonymous college. Former president of Argentina Mauricio Macri was member of the club and played rugby there.

Notable rugby players who started their careers in Newman include Cristián Viel, Agustín Canalda, Francisco Irrarázabal, Felipe Contepomi, Manuel Contepomi, Marcos Ayerza, Gonzalo Gutiérrez Taboada, Miguel Urtubey, Marcos Bollini and Agustin Gosio.

In 2025, Newman won their first Torneo de la URBA title after defeating San Isidro Club 15–3 at San Isidro. The first half had ended 8–3 in favor of the team from Benavídez. Newman's starting line up was: Miguel Prince, Marcelo Brandi, Bautista Bosch, Pablo Cardinal, Alejandro Urtubey, Faustino Santarelli, Joaquín de la Vega, Rodrigo Díaz de Vivar, Lucas Marguery, Gonzalo Gutiérrez Taboada, Jerónimo Ulloa, Tomás Keena, Benjamín Lanfranco, Santiago Marolda, and Juan Bautista Daireaux. Marcelo Brandi and Bautista Bosch scored tries for Newman.

Also in 2025, Newman won their first Nacional de Clubes title after defeating Mendoza Province's representative Marista 38–15.

In 2026, Newman claimed their second and consecutive URBA title after defeating Hindú 33–32.

== Titles ==
- Nacional de Clubes (1): 2025
- URBA Top 12 (2): 2025, 2026

== See also ==
- Colegio Cardenal Newman
