= Club San Luis =

Argentine rugby union and field hockey club

(Argentina) San Luis
- Full name: Club San Luis
- Union: URBA
- Nickname(s): Marista, Cicloneta
- Founded: 15 December 1961; 64 years ago
- Location: Tolosa, Argentina
- Ground: La Plata
- Chairman: Marcelo Campodónico
- Coach: Luciano Lazzarini
- League: Primera A
- 2026: 1st (champion and promoted)
Team kit

Official website
- clubsanluis.com.ar

Club San Luis is an Argentine rugby union and field hockey club from the city of Tolosa in La Plata Partido, Buenos Aires Province. The rugby team currently plays in the Primera A, the second division of the Unión de Rugby de Buenos Aires league system. Likewise, the hockey team competes at the tournaments organised by the Buenos Aires Hockey Association (AHBA).

San Luis' main rival is fellow platense club La Plata.

== History ==
In 1960, La Plata's "Colegio San Luis" registered a team with the Unión de Rugby de Buenos Aires. A year later "Club San Luis" was founded and started playing friendly games, being Horacio Lascano its provisory president. In 1962 San Luis registered with Argentine Rugby Union, having been recommended by Club Pueyrredón and Buenos Aires Cricket & Rugby Club. Ernesto Cóppola was elected as club's first president.

In 1967 the team debuted in "Tercera de Clasificación" (then the third division of Argentine rugby) championship, being the runner-up at the end of the season. Two years later San Luis promoted to the second division.

In 1975 San Luis played its first international match, a friendly game against Uruguayan team Old Christians, which was formed by some survivors of Uruguayan Air Force Flight 571. After a European tour, the team promoted to first division that same year. In 1978 the club was relegated again due to a restructuring in the league system.

In 1985 the club bought land close to the school. Thanks to donations from the college alumni, the club would go on to build several rugby fields, as well as a club house. Named La Casona, the club's installation were officially inaugurated in 1986. The main stadium, named Luis María Manes, was inaugurated in 1989.

In 1992 San Luis returned to first division, although a year later the club would be relegated again to second division. Nevertheless, in 1994 San Luis got another promotion to first division. In 1998 the team got its only title to date, the Nacional de Clubes championship, shared with San Cirano after a [draw in the final game. In 2000 San Luis toured over South Africa for the first time

The women's field hockey section was added in 2007, and its stadium opened a year later. To commemorate its 50th. anniversary, in 2011 San Luis changed its traditional home jersey by one in vertical stripes, similar to football team San Lorenzo de Almagro's.

San Luis was relegated to Primera A (the second division) in 2025 (relegated via playoffs). One year later, the club finished 1st, becoming league champion and also promoting to Top 14 after defeating neighbor team Universitario 33–16 with two fixtures remaining.

== Titles ==
- Nacional de Clubes (1): 1998
- Primera A (1): 2026
