= Club de Regatas Bella Vista =

Argentinian sports club based in Buenos Aires

(Argentina) Regatas
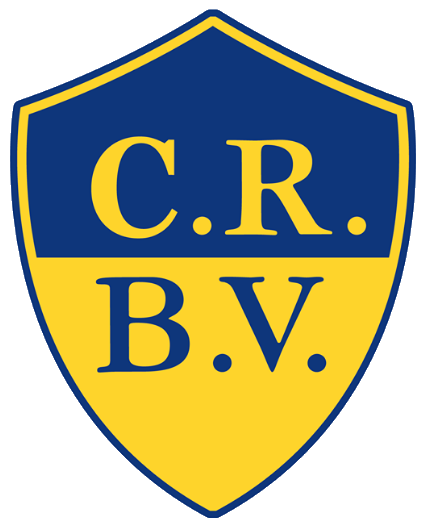
- Full name: Club de Regatas Bella Vista
- Union: URBA
- Founded: 14 February 1895; 131 years ago
- Location: Bella Vista, Argentina
- Ground: Av. Francia
- President: Enrique Camerlinckx
- Coach: Santiago Medrano
- League: Top 14
- 2025: 8th.
Team kit

Official website
- regatasbellavista.com.ar

Club de Regatas Bella Vista is an Argentine amateur sports club headquartered in the Bella Vista district of San Miguel Partido. Founded in 1895 as a rowing club, Regatas later developed other sports activities, such as rugby union, field hockey, football and tennis.

The rugby team currently plays in the Top 12, the first division of the Unión de Rugby de Buenos Aires league system. On the other hand, the hockey teams compete in tournaments organised by the Buenos Aires Hockey Association (AHBA).

== History ==
Club de Regatas Bella Vista was founded on February 14, 1895, by former members of the Buenos Aires Rowing Club who wanted to develop the sport of rowing in the city of Bella Vista. Most inhabitants of Bella Vista at the time had French origins; one of them, Enrique Goubat, is credited as being the founding father of the club.

Rugby has always been played at the club, but it was only since the 1960s, with the acquisition of new lands and the construction of several new rugby pitches, that the club became strong in the Unión de Rugby de Buenos Aires championship.

Regatas' best performance ever was during the 2002 championship, when the team reached the finals but was later defeated by San Isidro Club. In November 2011, Bella Vista was relegated to the second division.

Regatas has achieved more success in the rugby sevens version of the game, winning the provincial tournament in 1985. The club's underaged teams have also earned some success since the 1990s, winning the Under-19 title in 1999 and finishing second in the 2008 Under-22 championship. In 2005, the club won both the URBA U15 and U16 titles. In 2011 Regatas was relegated to Grupo II (second division) but just one year later the club returned to the top division of Argentine rugby league system.

Regatas returned to the top division (then "Grupo I") after defeating San Albano by 20–15 in November 2012.
