= Chevallier =

Chevallier is a French surname. The word originated during the Middle Ages when it denoted a knight. There are multiple variations of this name, including Chevalier. Notable people with the surname include:

- Alain Chevallier (c. 1948–2016), French motorcycle designer and brother of Olivier Chevallier
- Claire Chevallier (born 1969), Franco-Belgian classical pianist
- Darializa Avila Chevalier (born 1993 or 94), Dominican-American politician and activist
- Gabriel Chevallier (1895–1969), French novelist
- Jean-Baptiste-Alphonse Chevallier (1793–1879), French pharmacist-chemist
- Jean-Jacques Chevallier (1900–1983), French historian
- Jérôme Chevallier (1974–2025), French cyclist
- Olivier Chevallier (1949–1980), French Grand Prix motorcycle racer
- Philippe Chevallier (actor) (born 1956), French actor and comedian
- Philippe Chevallier (cyclist) (born 1961), French professional road bicycle racer
- Temple Chevallier (1794–1873), British professor of mathematics and astronomy
- Marie-Renée Chevallier-Kervern (1902–1987), French artist
- Chevalliers of Aspall Hall, a family resident at Aspall, Suffolk, producers of Aspall Cyder

== See also ==
- Chevallier (crater), Moon crater named after Temple Chevallier
- Chevallier family tree
