= Aspall =

Aspall may refer to:

- Aspall, Suffolk, a village and civil parish in the Mid Suffolk district of Suffolk, England
- Aspall Cyder, produced in Suffolk, England
