= 1949 France rugby union tour of Argentina =

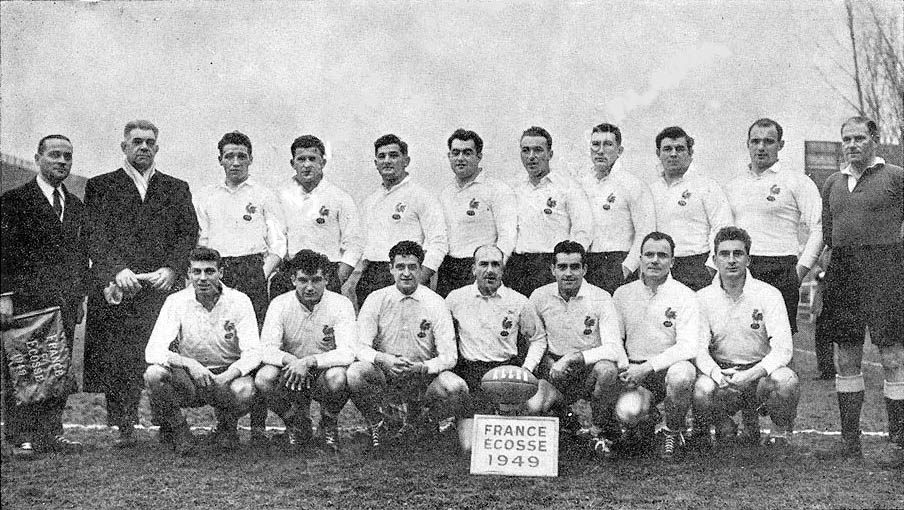
- Team of France that played v Scotland in January 1949
- Manager: R. Crabos
- Tour captain: G. Basquet
Summary
P	W	D	L
Total
9	9	0	0
Test match
2	2	0	0
Opponent
P	W	D	L
Argentina
2	2	0	0

The 1949 France rugby union tour of Argentina was a series of rugby union matches played by the France national team in Argentina. It was the first official visit of a European team in South America, so Argentina had only played 13 matches against the British Lions during their tours of 1927 and 1936, the Junior Springboks in 1932, the Oxford and Cambridge universities in 1948 (all of them in Argentina), and Chile (being the first matches as visitor, playing two games in Valparaíso in 1936, with two victories for Argentina).

Former Club Universitario de Buenos Aires player Frank K. Chevallier Boutell, then treasurer of the Argentine Rugby Union, was the main ideologue of the France tour, organising a fundraiser to secure a visit from the team, which would be the first tour a top-level international team to Argentina. Chevallier Boutell first traveled to France to arrange the invitation and then took charge of the campaign to raise the necessary funds, as the Union lacked the required resources. Some local clubs also helped the initiative, Hindú Club gave its training field in Don Torcuato while Gimnasia y Esgrima de Buenos Aires (mostly known as "GEBA") gave its stadium, Estadio GEBA, for the matches held in Buenos Aires. The French community in Argentina gave their strong support to the initiative, buying half of the tickets on sale in advance.

Boutell also made the arrangements to get loans from the Banco de Londres and Banco de América del Sud. The tour was not only a landmark for Argentine rugby but a financial success so the Union totalised revenues for m$n 72,308,69, an amount higher than ever before.

Between the two test match was played an exhibition match between two mixed teams both formed of Argentinian and French Team. The "Blancos" (White) won against "Colorados" (Red) (24–14). Many referee were British people who lived in Argentina.

France won the nine matches played.

== Touring party ==
- Manager: R. Crabos
- Assistant manager: A. Jauréguy
- Captain: G. Basquet

=== Players ===
- Pierre Aristouy
- Yves Bergougnan
- Noel Baudr
- Eugene Buzy
- Lucien Caron
- Francis Desclaux
- Gerard Dufau
- Pierre Dizabo
- Henri Dutrain
- Robert Geneste
- Marcel Jol
- Robert Lacrampe
- Jean Lassègue
- Paul Lasaosa
- Jean Matheu
- Alban Moga
- Andre Moga
- Lucien Martin
- Jean Prat
- Mick Pomathios
- Robert Soro
- Maurice Terreau

== Match summary ==
Complete list of matches played by France in Argentina:

Test matches

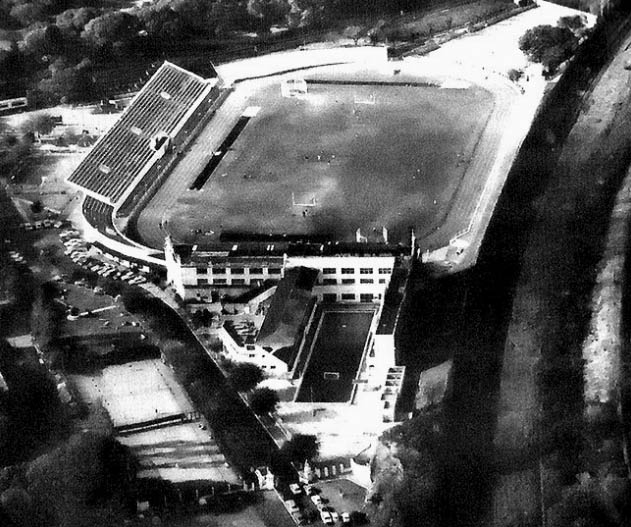
Estadio GEBA, venue for all the matches in Buenos Aires

#	Date	Rival	Res.	Score	City	Venue
1	7 Aug	Provincia (Note: Combined team formed by clubs of Buenos Aires Province)	won	21–3	Buenos Aires	Estadio GEBA
2	12 Aug	Combinado CASI–SIC	won	19–3	Buenos Aires	Estadio GEBA
3	14 Aug	Club Fundadores	won	26–3	Buenos Aires	Estadio GEBA
4	15 Aug	Seleccionado La Plata	won	21–3	Buenos Aires	Estadio GEBA
5	17 Aug	Pucará	won	16–0	Buenos Aires	Estadio GEBA
6	21 Aug	Capital (Note: Combined team formed by teams of "Capital Federal")	won	20–3	Buenos Aires	Estadio GEBA
7	24 Aug	Estudiantes (Paraná)	won	14–0	Paraná	n/a
8	28 Aug	Argentina	won	5–0	Buenos Aires	Estadio GEBA
9	4 Sep	Argentina	won	12–3	Buenos Aires	Estadio GEBA

== Match details ==
7 August 1949

Provincia	3–21	France

Estadio GEBA, Buenos Aires
Referee: T.Blades (Argentina)

Provincia: R. del Molino Torres, E. Caffarone, A. Dones, A. Palma, L. Ehrman, R. Giles, G. Ehrman, N_ Tompkins, M. Sarandón, R. Allen, E. Domínguez, A. Castelnuovo, J. Petrone, C. Swain, R. Follet.
France: N. Baudry, M. Pomathios, P. Dizabo, J. Lassegue, G. Dufau, Y. Bergougnan, Prat, G. Basquet, J. Matheu, J. Soro, Al. Moga, L. Caron, M. Jol, E. Buzy.

12 August 1949

CASI – SIC Combined	3–19	France

Estadio GEBA, Buenos Aires
Referee: John Knox (Argentina)

CASI–SIC: R. del Molino Torres, R. Gil, J. M. Belgrano, F. Guastavino, A. Arana, R. Ochoa, M. de las Carreras, M. Villalonga, L. Allen, M. Sarandón, H, Conti, J. Morganti, C. Rolón, C. Taccioli, C. Orti.
France: N. Baudry, M. Pomathios, F. Dizabo, F. Desclaux, R. Geneste, M. Terreau, P. Lasaosa, Prat, A. Moga, R. Lacrampe, R. Soro, Al. Moga, L. Caron, L. Martín, P. Aristouy.

14 August 1949

Club Fundadores	3–26	France

Estadio GEBA, Buenos Aires
Referee: O. A. Noon (Argentina)

Club Fundadores: E. Moore, W. Chiswell, J. Hardie, W. Mc Minn, R. Gilderdale, P. Macadam, J. Pow, D. Hughes, A. Phillips, E. Lucotti, A. Bori, G. Daw, G. Bridger, G. Hardie, E. Stocks.
France: N. Baudry; M. Pomathios, F. Desclaux, R. Geneste; J. Lassegue, "M. Terreau, Y. Bergougnan, R. Lacrampe, G. Basquet, J. Matheu, R. Soro, Al. Moga, E. Buzy, M. Jol, L. Caron.

15 August 1949

Seleccionado La Plata	3–21	France

n/a, La Plata
Referee: S. N. Oerton (Argentina)

La Plata: P. Garese, M. Morón, C. A. Mercader, R. Ferrando, R. Méndez, J. Ocampo, H. Dutil, L. Saraví, E. Weber, R. Arce, M. Galván, R. Gitard, R. Gorostiaga, H. Nocetti, P. Oppici.
France: N. Baudry, R. Geneste, H. Dutrain, M. Terreau, J. Lassegue, G. Dufau, P. Lasaosa, J. Matheu, An. Moga, R. Lacrampe, Al. Moga, R. Soro, P. Aristouy, L. Martin, E. Buzy.

17 August 1949

Club Pucará	0–16	France

Estadio GEBA, Buenos Aires
Referee: T. Blades (Argentina)

Pucará: G. Niveiro, P. Bereciartúa, A. Palma, J. C. de Pablo, L. Ehrman, R. E. Giles, G. Ehrman, H. de Pablo, D. Bereciartúa, E. Domínguez, A. Fernández, A. Barnadas, L. Carratelli, E. Dacharry, J. C. Petrone. |line-up2=France: F. Desclaux, J. Lassegue, H. Dutrain, P. Dizabo, R. Geneste, M. Terreau, Y. Bergougnan, J. Matheu, G. Basquet, G. Dufau, Al. Moga, R. Soro, E. Buzy, M. Jol, L. Caron.

21 August 1949

Capital	3–20	France

Estadio GEBA, Buenos Aires
Referee: John Knox (Argentina)

Capital: J. Genoud, 'W. Chiswell, J. Hardie, W. Mc Minn, R. Gilderdale, P. Macadam, C. Benítez Cruz, D. Hughes, A. Phillips, B. Grigolon, L. Maurette, A. Bori, C. Peterson, E. Verzoletto, G. Hardie.
France: : N. Baudry, H. Dutrain, M. Terreau, F. Desclaux, J. Lassegue, G. Dufau, Y. Bergougnan, Prat, J. Matheu, R. Soro, Al. Moga, L. Caron, M. Jol, E. Buzy.

24 August 1949

Estudiantes (Paraná)	0–14	France

Paraná
Referee: O. A. Noon (Argentina)

Estudiantes (P): M. Avellaneda, R. Castello, F. Luján, O. Gomes, F. Rodríguez Gurruchaga, F. García, F. Torné, M. Benavente, F. Fonseca, C. Ferrer, R. Caino, R. Arcioni, F. Borches, C. Rabuffetti, D. Kaufman.
France: : F. Desclaux, R. Geneste, M Terreau, H. Dutrain, J. Lassegue, N. Baudry, G. Dufau, Prat, An. Moga, R. Lacrampe, Al. Moga, R. Soro, L. Caron, J. Matheu, P. Aristouy.

=== First test ===
28 August 1949

Argentina	0–5	France
		Try: Caron; Con: Prat

Estadio GEBA, Buenos Aires
Referee: John Knox (Argentina)

Team details

Argentina	France

Argentina: W. Holmes, L. Dorado, A. Palma, P. Macadam, E. Caffarone, R. Giles, G. Ehrman, D. Hughes, A. Phillips, M. Sarandon, W. Tompkins, A. Domínguez, J. Petrone, C. Swain, C. Orti.
France: : N. Baudry, M. Pomathios, F: Desclaux, H. Dutrain, J. Lassegue, M., Terreau, Y. Bergougnan; Prat, G. Basquet, J. Matheu, R. Soro, Al. Moga, E. Buzy, M. Jol, L. Caron.

=== Second test ===
4 September 1949

Argentina	3–12	France
Try: Palma		Try: Pomathios, Prat; Con: Prat; Drop: Prat

Estadio GEBA, Buenos Aires
Referee: O. A. Noon (Argentina)

Team details

Argentina	France

Argentina: W. Holmes, W. Chiswell, A. Palma, P. Macadam, E. Caffarone, R. Giles, G. Elirman, D. Hughes, A. Phillips, M. Sarandon, N. Tompkins, A. Domínguez, J. Petrone, E, Dacharry, C. Corti.
France: : N. Baudry, M. Pomathios, R. Geneste, P. Dizabo, P. Desclaux, M. Terreau, Y. Bergougnan, Prat, R. Lacrampe, J. Matheu, R. Soro, Al. Moga, E. Buzy, M. Jol, P. Aristouy.

== Exhibition Match ==
An Exhibition match was played between the two test match. Two teams were arranged, both with some French and Argentinian players. The "Blancos" ("Whites"), won against "Colorados" ("Coloreds")

30 August 1949

Blancos	24–14	Colorados

Estadio G.E.B.A., Buenos Aires
Referee: S. N. Oerton (Argentina)

Blancos J. Prat, H. Dutrain, R. Geneste, F: Desclaux; M. Pomathios, G. Dufau, P. Lasaosa, H. Caño (Curu¬paytí), L. Allen (C.A.S.I.), B. Grigolon (Hindú), W. Beckwith (San Martín), H. Conti (S.I.C.), A. Guyot (C.A.S.I.), E. Dacharry (Pucará), C. Peterson (Bs. As.).
Colorados: : M. Avellaneda (Estudiantes), R. Gilder¬dale (Bs. As.), E. Fernández del Casol (C.U.B.A.), A. Jones (Old G's), C. Di Pasquo (Curupaytí), M. Fellner (C.U.B.A.), C. Benítez Cruz (C.U.B.A.), R. Lacrampe, An. Moga, J. Matheu, R. Soro, Al. Moga, E. Buzy, R. Martin, P. Aristouy.
