= Chevalliers of Aspall Hall =

Landowning family of Aspel hall in the United Kingdom

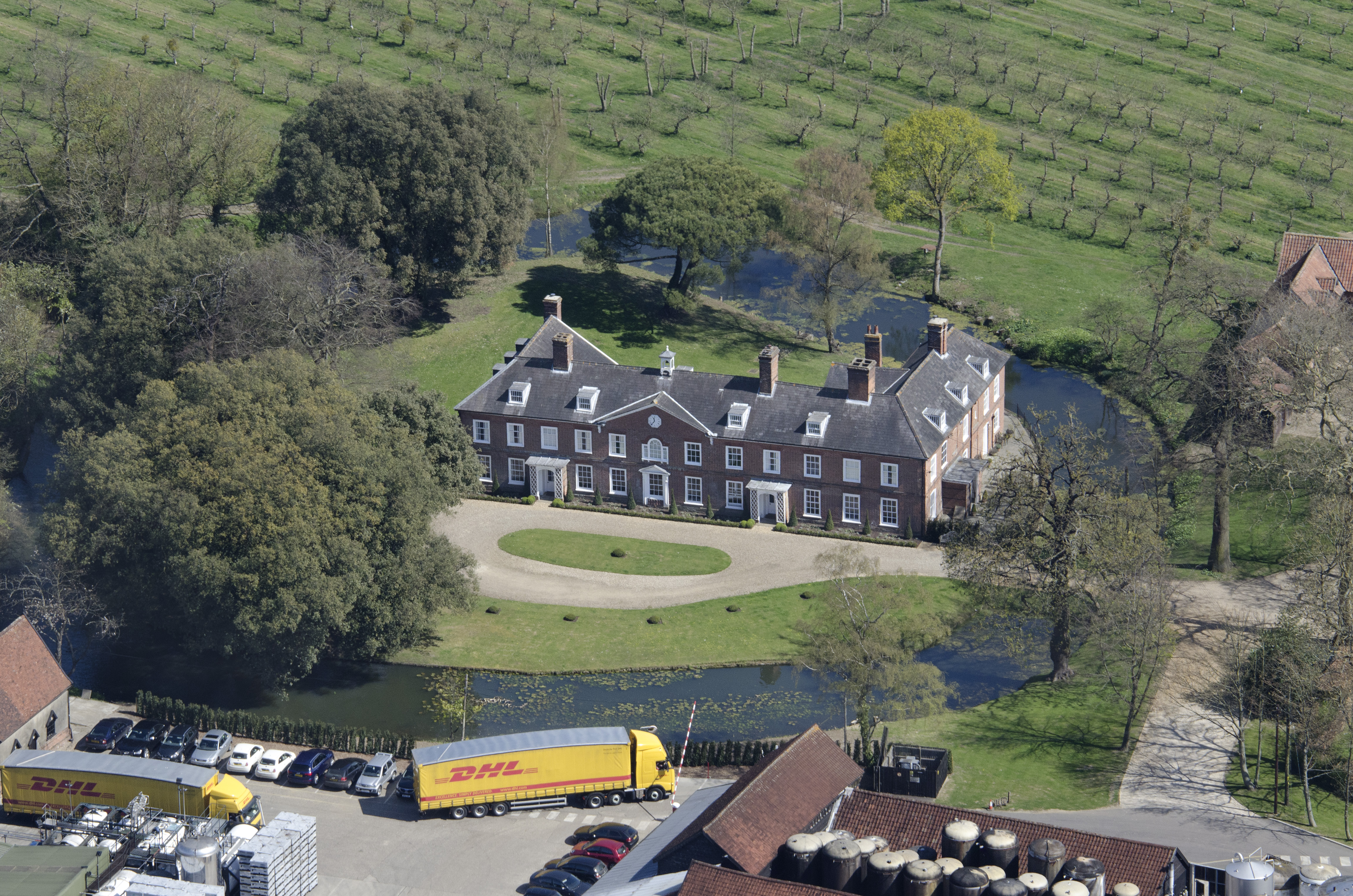
Aspall Hall

The Chevalliers of Aspall Hall are a family in Britain that has lived and farmed at Aspall Hall since 1702. Descendants of the family still exist, and are involved in the production of Aspall Cider.

== Possessors of Aspall Hall, male line ==
1. Temple Chevallier (1674–1722), bought the Aspall estate in 1702 from the Brooke family. He had no issue, so the property passed to a close relative:
2. Clement Benjamin Chevallier (1697–1762), son of Clement Chevallier (1674–1719) and Marie Dumaresque (died 1737). He married Jane, daughter of Nathaniel Garneys, of Mickfield (1693–1752), of a Suffolk gentry family. His descendants included also the astronomer Temple Chevallier (1794–1873).
3. Temple Chevallier (1731–1804), married Mary Fiske.
4. Rev. John Chevallier (1774–1846), who married first Caroline Hepburn of Wisbech (1776–1815) (from her were born: Mary (1809–1880), who married Charles Boutell, Caroline, married 1839 Thomas Kinder of St Albans, John Clement, John, George and Charlotte Sophia—all died as infants), his second wife was Emily Blomfield Syer (they had two sons), and last Elizabeth Cole of Bermondsey, Surrey, mother of Frances Anne, mother of the first Earl Kitchener.

== See also ==
- Chevallier, a French surname
