= 1945–46 Victory Internationals =

Athletic competition

The so-called Victory Internationals is a list of rugby union matches played in Europe from 1945 to 1946 between British, Irish, New Zealand and French rugby union representatives.

During the Second World War, international matches were suspended, with the exception of some matches between Italy, Germany and Romania. Earlier, in June 1939, France was re-admitted to play in the 1940 international match against British teams, a full schedule was re-introduced in the Five Nations Championship in 1947.

The international matches were not recognized as "official" ("capped matches") by British or Irish unions due to the absence of many players still serving in the armed forces in European and Pacific Ocean theatres. France however did award full caps for each of these games.

The New Zealand selection was called the "Kiwis", and was also known as the 2nd New Zealand Expeditionary Force Rugby Team (a group of New Zealand soldiers), a name derived from 2NZEF. Like its British counterparts, it did not award any national cap, but this team eventually became widely recognized in its country and more than half of the Kiwi players ended up also playing for the All Blacks.

The activity restarted on 1 January 1945, with a match between France and a British Army selection, played in Colombes, followed by a match played at Richmond on 28 April, between a "British Empire XV" and France. More regular matches were played between December 1945 and April 1946.

In 2013, the Welsh Rugby Union finally decided to award a cap for all the otherwise uncapped Welsh players who took part in the 1945 and 1946 matches against France.

== Results ==
1 January 1945	France	21 - 9	British Army	Parc des Princes, Paris
	Try: Baladie, Dauger (2), Prin-Clary, Sahuc; Con: Desclaux, Prat (2)		Try: Holmes, Risman, TL Williams	Attendance: 30000; Referee: Henry Arthur Fry (England)

28 April 1945	British Empire Forces	27 - 6	France	Athletic Ground, Richmond
	Try: Hollis (2), Owens (2), Risman (2), Williams; Con: Risman (3)		Try: Massare; Pen: Prat	Referee: R.A. Beattie (Scotland)

22 December 1945	Wales XV	8 - 0	France	St. Helen's, Swansea
	Try: Davies, Matthews; Con: James			Attendance: 25000

1 January 1946	France	10 - 0	British Empire Services	Parc des Princes, Paris
	Try: Baladie, Prat; Drop: Bergougnan			Attendance: 30000; Referee: Cyril Herbert Gadney (England)

5 January 1946	Wales XV	3 - 11	Kiwis	Arms Park, Cardiff

19 January 1946	England XV	3 - 18	Kiwis	Twickenham, London
				Referee: R.A. Beattie (Scotland)

19 January 1946	Wales XV	13 - 25	England XV	Arms Park, Cardiff

19 January 1946	Scotland XV	11 - 6	Kiwis	Murrayfield Stadium, Edinburgh

26 January 1946	Ireland XV	3 - 4	France	Lansdowne Road, Dublin
	Try: Thorpe		Drop: Bergougnan	Attendance: 40000; Referee: H.G. Lathwell (England)

2 February 1946	Wales XV	6 - 25	Scotland XV	Swansea

6 February 1946	England XV	14 - 6	Ireland XV	Twickenham, London

9 February 1946	Ireland XV	4 - 3	England XV	Lansdowne Road, Dublin

23 February 1946	Scotland XV	9 - 0	Ireland XV	Murrayfield, Edinburgh

23 February 1946	England XV	0 - 3	Wales XV	Twickenham, London

9 March 1946	Wales XV	6 - 4	Ireland XV	Arms Park, Cardiff

10 March 1946	France	9 - 14	Kiwis	Stade Olympique Yves-du-Manoir, Colombes
	Try: Baladie, Pebeyre, Terreau		Try: Blake, Sherratt (2); Con: Scott; Pen: Scott	Attendance: 21000; Referee: George Warden (England)

13 March 1946	Rhine Army XV	0 - 12	Kiwis	Stadion am Zoo, Wuppertal
				Referee: Major B.E.W. McCall M.C. (Wales)

16 March 1946	England XV	12 - 8	Scotland XV	Twickenham, London

24 March 1946	France	10 - 13	Kiwis	Stade Ernest Wallon, Toulouse
				Referee: Mon. Barbe (France)

30 March 1946	Scotland XV	13 - 11	Wales XV	Murrayfield, Edinburgh

13 April 1946	Scotland XV	27 - 0	England XV	Murrayfield, Edinburgh

22 April 1946	France	12 - 0	Wales XV	Yves-du-Manoir, Colombes
	Try: Terreau (2); Con: Prat; Drop: Alvarez			Attendance: 34000; Referee: Alan Shilleto Bean (England)
