= Francis Hepburn Chevallier-Boutell =

British engineer

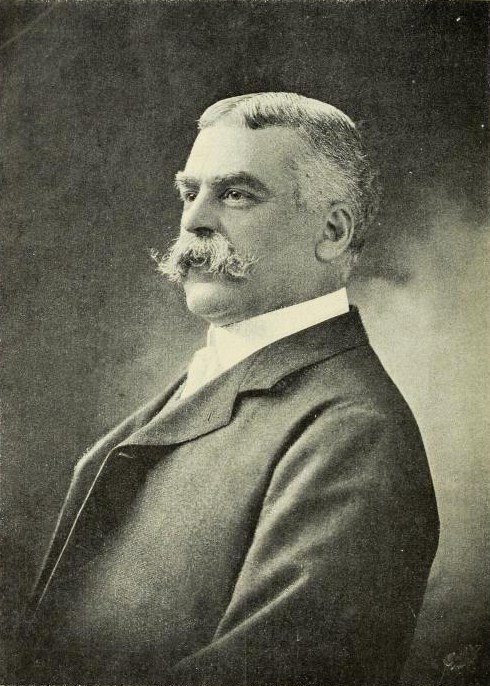
- F. H. Chevallier-Boutell

President of the Argentine Football Association
- In office 1900–1906

Personal details
- Born: 8 June 1851 Aspall, United Kingdom
- Died: 19 February 1937 (aged 85) Paignton, United Kingdom
- Resting place: Aspall Cemetery
- Spouse: Rosa Hepburn Chevallier Boutell
- Occupation: Chairman
- Profession: Engineer

Sir Francis Hepburn Chevallier-Boutell F.R.G.S (8 June 1851 in Aspall – 19 February 1937 in Paignton, United Kingdom) was a British engineer and sports manager, who served as President of the Argentine Football Association (AFA) between 1900 and 1906. Boutell had also a long tenure as president of Lomas Athletic Club, being in charge from 1894 to 1918.

== Biography ==
Chevallier-Boutell was born in Aspall, Suffolk, England, son of Charles Boutell and Mary Chevallier. He studied at St John's College, Oxford. Around 1875, he arrived at the Río de la Plata, where was married to Rosa Granero, born in Montevideo.

Established in Buenos Aires he served as a representative of several British railway companies, including the Anglo-Argentine Tramways Company, and East Argentine Railway. He was member of Club del Progreso, Jockey Club, Círculo de Armas and Lomas Athletic Club.

In 1900, Francis Hepburn Chevallier-Boutell was in charge of the Argentine Football Association (AFA), serving as president of the institution until 1906. He organized the Tie Cup, an international football competition played between clubs from Argentina and Uruguay.

Chevallier-Boutell's nephew, Frank, was a notable rugby union player for Club Universitario de Buenos Aires or ("CUBA") and then president of the institution (1958–60), and honorary treasurer of the Argentine Rugby Union.
