= Chevalier =

Chevalier may refer to:

== Honours ==
=== Belgium ===
- a rank in the Belgian Order of the Crown
- a rank in the Belgian Order of Leopold
- a rank in the Belgian Order of Leopold II
- a title in the Belgian nobility

=== France ===
- a rank in the French Legion of Honour
- a rank in the French Ordre des Arts et des Lettres
- a rank in the French Ordre des Palmes académiques
- a rank in the French Ordre national du Mérite

=== Other ===
- Chevalier, a member of certain orders of knighthood
- "Degree of Chevalier", the highest honor for an active member of DeMolay International

== Entertainment ==
- Chevalier (2015 film), a Greek comedy
- Chevalier (2022 film), an American drama
- Chevalier: Le Chevalier D'Eon, a 2005 Japanese anime and manga
- Chevalier, a type of character in the anime and manga series Blood+
- Chevaliers squad, a training squad at the Xavier Institute in Marvel Comics

== Other ==
- Chevalier de Saint-Georges, Afro-Caribbean and French classical composer, fencer, and violinist
- Chevalier College, an MSC school in Bowral, Australia
- Chevalier-Montrachet, a Grand Cru vineyard in the Côte de Beaune
- Chevalier Garden, a public housing estate in Hong Kong
- Jules Chevalier, a French Catholic priest and founder of the Chevalier Family of missions
- Mount Chevalier, a mountain in New Zealand

== See also ==
- Chevalier (name)
- Chevallier (disambiguation)
