= Jean Lassègue =

France international rugby union player

- Born: 15 February 1924 Rieumes, France
- Died: 4 June 1992 (aged 68) Toulouse, France
- Height: 5 ft 10 in (178 cm)
- Weight: 176 lb (80 kg)

Rugby union career
- Position: Wing three–quarter
International career
| Years | Team | Apps | (Points) |
| 1946–49 | France | 9 | (15) |

Jean Lassègue (15 February 1924 – 4 June 1992) was a French international rugby union player.

A native of Rieumes, Lassègue began playing for Stade Toulousain after World War II. He was a farmer by profession and missed Stade Toulousain's 1947 championship final win over SU Agen after being injured in an incubator explosion on his property. Capped nine times for France, Lassègue contributed three tries during the 1947 Five Nations, of which two came in a win over Ireland at Lansdowne Road. He finished his international career with a tour of Argentina in 1949.

Lassègue defected to rugby league in 1950, signing with AS Carcassonne.

== See also ==
- List of France national rugby union players
