= Frank K. Chevallier Boutell =

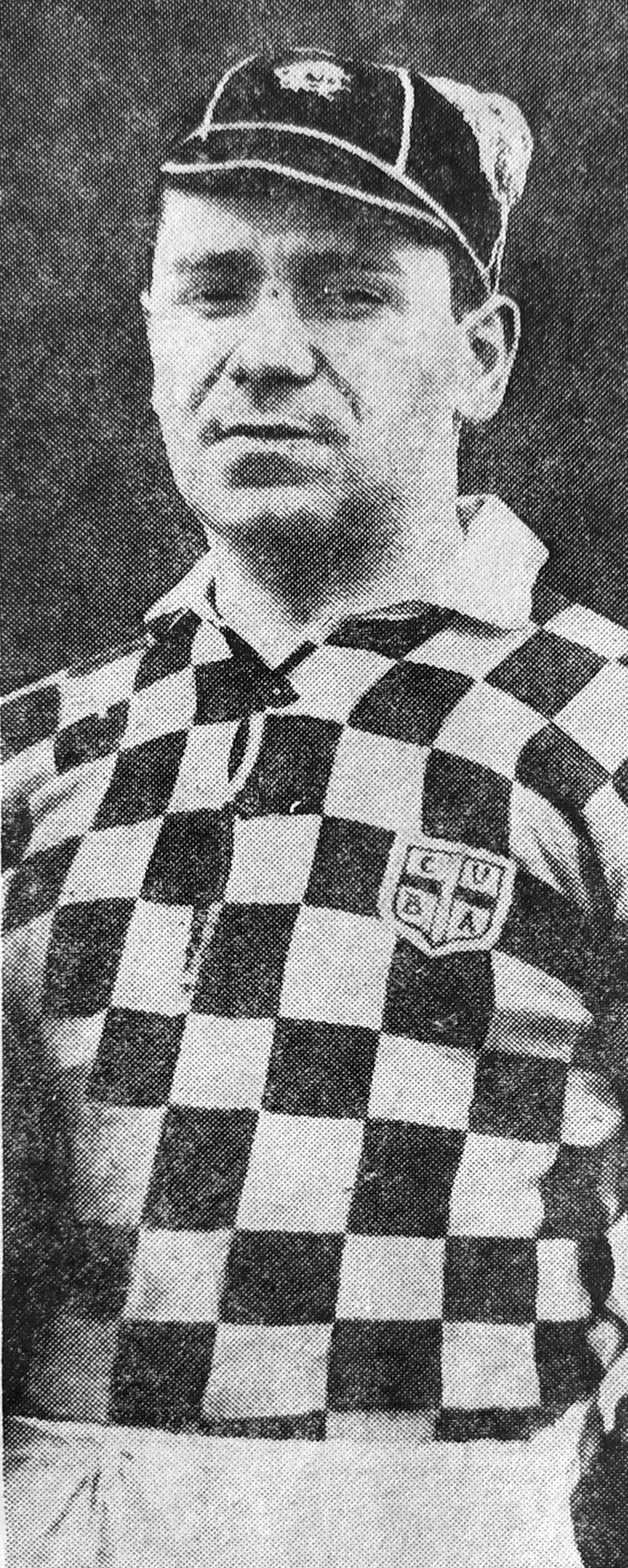
- Chevallier Boutell in 1927
- Born: Frank Kitchener Chevallier Boutell García Osorio; January 25, 1899 Greater Buenos Aires, Argentina
- Died: January 24, 1974 (aged 84) Tandil, Buenos Aires Province, Argentina

Rugby union career
- Position: Forward
Senior career
Years	Team	Apps	(Points)
- Buenos Aires F.C.
- Universitario (BA)

Frank K. Chevallier Boutell (1899–1974) was an Argentine lawyer, and sportsman. He was player and vice president of the Club Universitario de Buenos Aires, and treasurer of the Argentine Rugby Union (UAR).

== Sport career ==
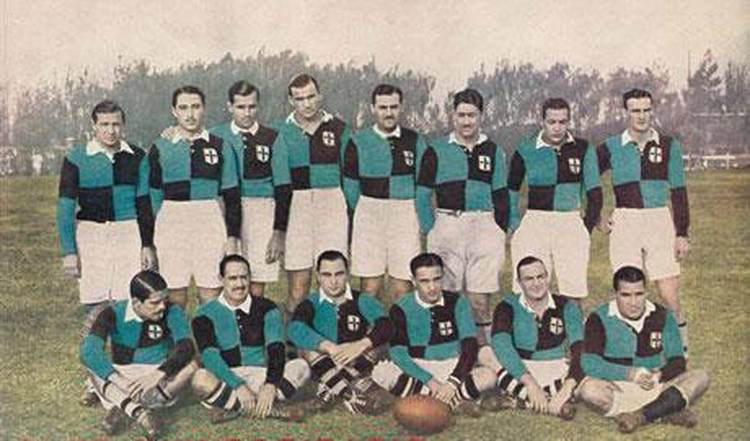
Boutell at the CUBA team of 1931

Chevallier Boutell began his career playing in the Buenos Aires F.C., then he played in Universitario, team where he won the URBA championship of 1931. He was the vice-president of Universitario and of the Argentine Rugby Union in 1949–1950.

Chevallier Boutell served also as honorary secretary of the same institution in 1932. He serves as president of CUBA between 1958 and 1960.

== Sports executive ==
As treasurer of the UAR (then "Unión de Rugby del Río de la Plata"), in 1949 Chevallier Boutell organized a fundraiser to secure a visit from France national team, the first tour a top-level international team had ever undertaken in the country. Chevallier Boutell first traveled to France to arrange the invitation and then took charge of the campaign to raise the necessary funds, as the Union lacked the required resources. Some local clubs also helped the initiative, Hindú Club gave its training field in Don Torcuato while Gimnasia y Esgrima de Buenos Aires (mostly known as "GEBA") gave its stadium, Estadio GEBA, for the matches held in Buenos Aires.

Boutell also made the arrangements to get loans from the Banco de Londres and Banco de América del Sud. The France tour on Argentina was not only a landmark for Argentine rugby but a financial success so the Union totalised revenues for m$n 72,308,69, an amount higher than ever before.

== Personal life ==
He was born in Quilmes, son of Arthur Brandon Chevallier Boutell, born in England, and María Josefina García Osorio, belonging to an ancient family of Creole roots. He was graduated as a lawyer at the University of Buenos Aires.

Boutell was nephew of Francis Hepburn Chevallier-Boutell, president of the Argentine Football Association between 1900 and 1906.

Frank K. Chevallier Boutell was married with Raquel Benegas Lynch, a distinguished lady descendant of Justo Pastor Lynch and Miguel de Riglos Bástida.
