= Maurice Terreau =

France international rugby union player

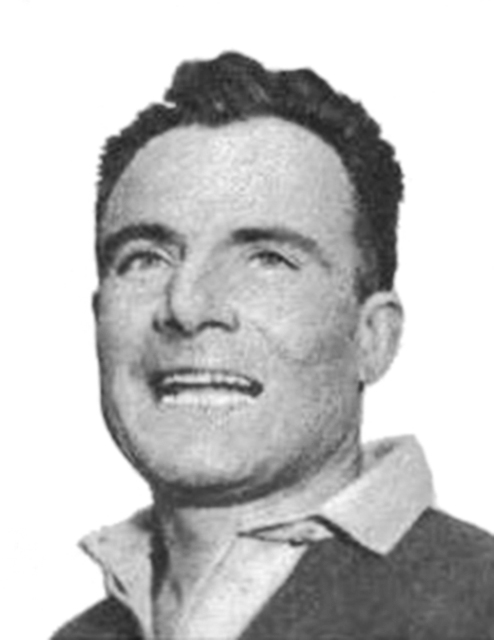
- Born: 30 January 1923 Bourg-en-Bresse, France
- Died: 22 December 2000 (aged 77) Bourg-en-Bresse, France
- Height: 5 ft 9 in (175 cm)
- Weight: 177 lb (80 kg)

Rugby union career
- Position: Centre / Fly-half
International career
Years	Team	Apps	(Points)
1945–51	France	17	(15)

Maurice Terreau (30 January 1923 – 22 December 2000) was a French international rugby union player.

== Biography ==
Terreau was born in raised in Bourg-en-Bresse.

A centre and fly–half, Terreau debuted for France in the 1945–46 Victory Internationals. He gained a total of 17 caps between 1945 and 1951, scoring five tries. One of his tries helped France secure a first ever away win over Wales in 1948. He was a member of France's 1949 tour of Argentina. At club level, Terreau played for US Bressane.

Terreau took over his father's logging business.

== See also ==
- List of France national rugby union players
