= John Knox (rugby union) =

Scotland international rugby union player

- Born: John Knox; 5 August 1880 Prestwick, Scotland
- Died: 20 April 1964 (aged 83) Battle, England

Rugby union career
- Position: Scrum-half
Amateur team(s)
| Years | Team | Apps | (Points) |
- Kelvinside Academicals
Provincial / State sides
| Years | Team | Apps | (Points) |
- Glasgow District
International career
| Years | Team | Apps | (Points) |
| 1903 | Scotland | 3 | (0) |
Refereeing career
| Years | Competition | | Apps |
| 1949 | French tour of Argentina | | |

John Knox (1880–1964) was a Scotland international rugby union player

== Rugby Union career ==
=== Amateur career ===
Knox played for Kelvinside Academicals.

=== Provincial career ===
He was capped by Glasgow District in 1898 playing in the Inter-City match against Edinburgh District.

=== International career ===
He was capped 3 times for the Scotland international side, all in 1903.

=== Referee career ===
After his playing career ended, Knox became a referee. Resident in Argentina, he refereed for the Argentine Rugby Union.
