= Charles Boutell =

English archaeologist

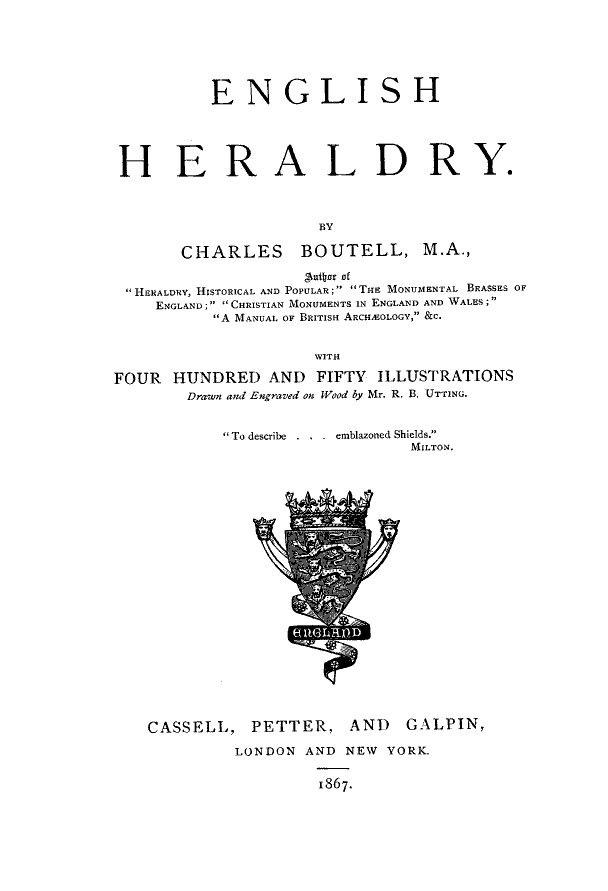
Title page of English Heraldry (1867) by Boutell

Charles Boutell (1 August 1812 – 31 July 1877) was an English archaeologist, antiquary and clergyman, publishing books on brasses, arms and armour and heraldry, often illustrated by his own drawings.

== Life ==
Boutell was born at Pulham St Mary, Norfolk, the son of the Rev. Charles Boutell. He entered St John's College, Cambridge, and graduated BA in 1834. In 1836 he took his MA at Trinity College, Oxford. Having served briefly as curate of Hemsby, Norfolk, and then curate of St Leonard's Church, Sandridge, Hertfordshire (1837–46), during which period, in 1839, he was ordained priest. He was subsequently rector of Downham Market (1847–1850) and vicar of Wiggenhall St Mary Magdalen, Norfolk (1847–55). After moving to London in 1855 he held various positions, including reader at St Luke's, Lower Norwood, Surrey (1860–67).

He was secretary of the St Albans Architectural Society, founded in 1845; and was one of the founders in 1855 of the London and Middlesex Archaeological Society. During the first forty years of the Surrey Archaeological Society, Boutell appeared regularly as lecturer at the Society's annual excursions.

Among Boutell's several publications, A Manual of Heraldry, Historical and Popular (1863) was particularly successful. A second edition was called for in two months (published under the revised title, Heraldry, Historical and Popular), and a third edition appeared in 1864. Boutell also published a shorter companion work, English Heraldry (1867), which appeared in a second edition in 1871, and in several later editions including those revised by S.T. Aveling in 1892 and by A.C. Fox-Davies in 1907. The two works had become standard popular heraldic handbooks, and in 1931 a book entitled Boutell's Manual of Heraldry was published, edited by V. Wheeler-Holohan, which drew on both Boutell's originals. Later revisions, now simply entitled Boutell's Heraldry, were edited by C.W. Scott-Giles (1950, 1954, 1958, 1963 and 1966) and J.P. Brooke-Little (1963, 1966, 1970, 1973, 1978 and 1983).

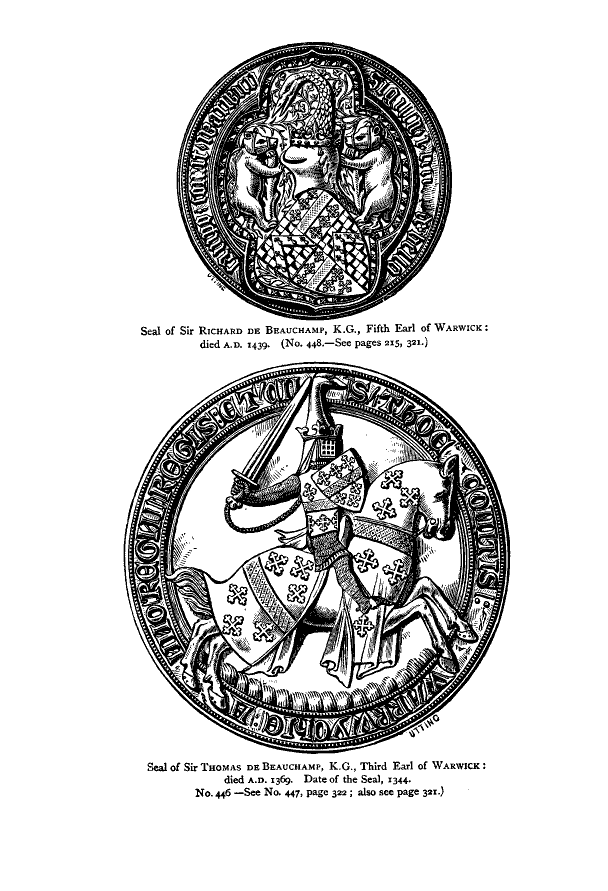
Illustrations by R. B. Utting from Boutell's English Heraldry

== Financial difficulties ==
Boutell served as Honorary Secretary of the London and Middlesex Archaeological Society from 23 July to 27 November 1857, but was dismissed for what was termed "improper" bookkeeping, involving the amount of £56 15s received in subscription fees. According to Charles Roach Smith, he subsequently suffered from a "similar lapse" in relation to the Surrey Archaeological Society. In 1868 he was imprisoned for debt, and in December of that year was declared bankrupt.

== Death ==
Boutell died of a ruptured heart on 31 July 1877, following two years of declining health. He was buried at Paddington Old Cemetery, Kilburn.

== Family ==
He married Mary Chevallier (1809–1885), daughter of John Chevallier and Caroline Hepburn.

Their children were:

- Caroline Ellen Alice Boutell (1843–1882), married Nathanael Fromanteel Cobbold (1839–1886), son of John Cobbold (1797–1882), of the brewery family
- Charles John Boutell
- Mary Chevallier-Boutell
- Arthur Brandon Chevallier-Boutell (1849–1923)
- Sir Francis Hepburn Chevallier-Boutell (1851–1937)

== Works ==
- Monumental Brasses and Slabs (1847)
- The monumental brasses of England – (George Bell, 1849)
- Christian Monuments in England & Wales – (George Bell, 1854)
- A Manual of British Archaeology – Printed by Savill & Edwards - (Lovell Reeve, London, 1858)
- Heraldry, Historical and Popular, 3rd Edition, London, 1864
- English Heraldry - Cassell, Petter, and Galpin, (London and New York, 1867)
- Arms and Armour in Antiquity and the Middle Ages: also a Descriptive Notice of Modern Weapons Translated from the French of Paul Lacombe (1834–1919) - (New York, C. Scribner & Co., 1871)
- A Bible dictionary for the use of all readers and students of the Holy Scriptures of the Old and New Testaments of the books of the Apocrypha - (London: E. Moxon, Son and Co., 1871)
- The Arts and the Artistic Manufactures of Denmark
- The Handbook to English Heraldry - edited by Arthur Charles Fox-Davies, wood engravings by Robert Brooke Utting (Reeves & Turner, 1914)
