= Mount Ross (Two Thumb Range) =

Mountain in Canterbury, New Zealand

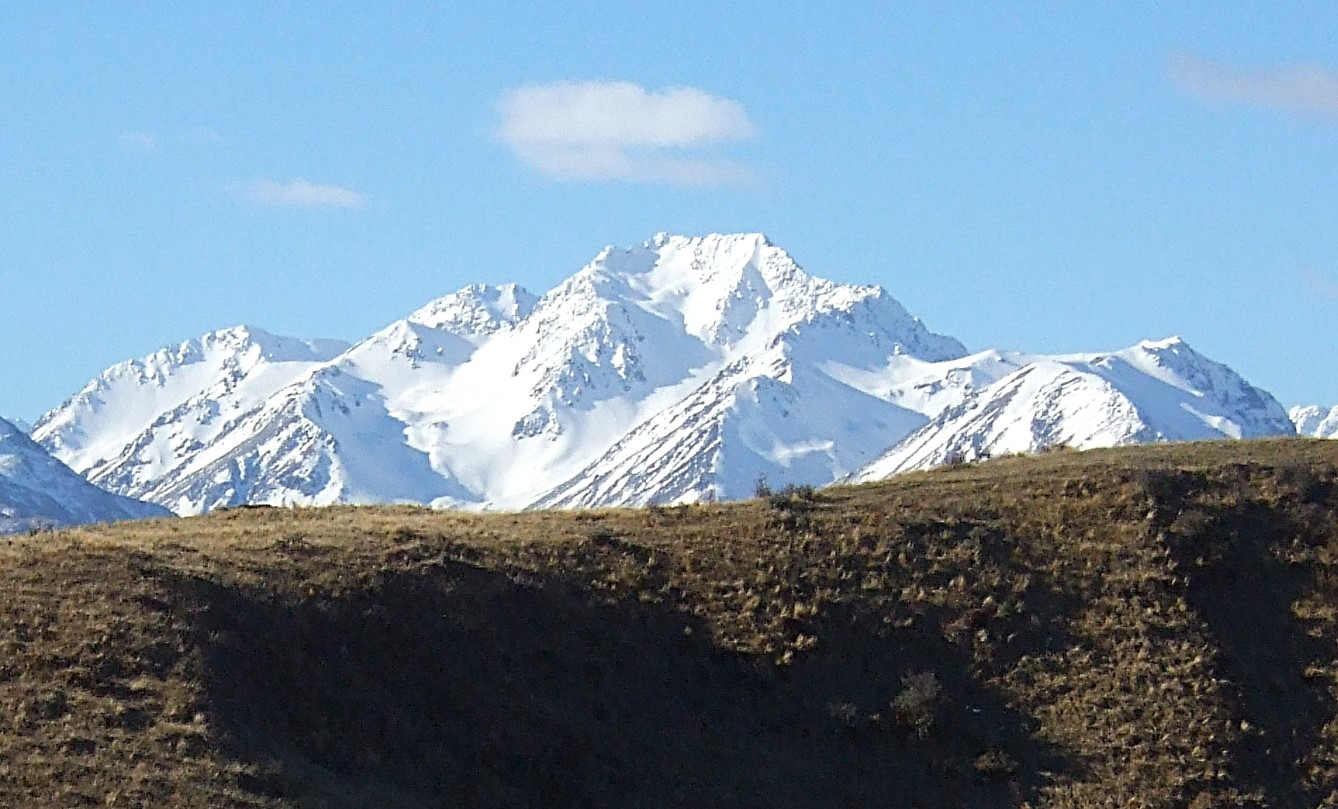
- South aspect

Highest point
- Elevation: 2,366 m (7,762 ft)
- Prominence: 226 m (741 ft)
- Isolation: 2.97 km (1.85 mi)
- Coordinates: 43.5963°S 170.6489°E

Naming
- Etymology: John Ross

Geography
- Location within New Zealand
- Interactive map of Mount Ross
- Location: South Island
- Country: New Zealand
- Region: Canterbury
- Protected area: Te Kahui Kaupeka Conservation Park
- Parent range: Southern Alps; Two Thumb Range
- Topo map(s): NZMS260 I36; Topo50 BX17

Climbing
- First ascent: 1934

Mount Ross is a 2,366-metre-elevation (7,762-foot) mountain in Canterbury Region of New Zealand.

== Description ==
Mount Ross is part of the Two Thumb Range which is a subrange of the Southern Alps. It is located 185 kilometres (115 mi) west of the city of Christchurch in the Canterbury Region of the South Island. Precipitation runoff from the mountain drains west into the Macaulay River and east into North East Gorge Stream, which is a tributary of the Macaulay. Topographic relief is significant as the summit rises 1,400 metres (4,593 feet) above the Macaulay Valley in less than three kilometres. The nearest higher neighbour is Mount Chevalier, three kilometres to the north. The mountain's toponym honours John Ross, an 1870s manager of a station adjoining nearby Lilybank Station. The first ascent of the summit was made in 1934 by Bill Cullens, Stan Forbes, and Frank Gillett.

== Climbing ==
Climbing routes and the first ascents:

- Via Macaulay River – Bill Cullens, Stan Forbes, Frank Gillett – (1934)
- North East Ridge – Jenny Caine, Nel Caine – (1967)

== Climate ==
Based on the Köppen climate classification, Mount Ross is located in a marine west coast (Cfb) climate zone. Prevailing westerly winds blow moist air from the Tasman Sea onto the mountains, where the air is forced upwards by the mountains (orographic lift), causing moisture to drop in the form of rain or snow. The months of December through February offer the most favourable weather for viewing or climbing this peak.

== See also ==
- List of mountains of New Zealand by height

== Gallery ==
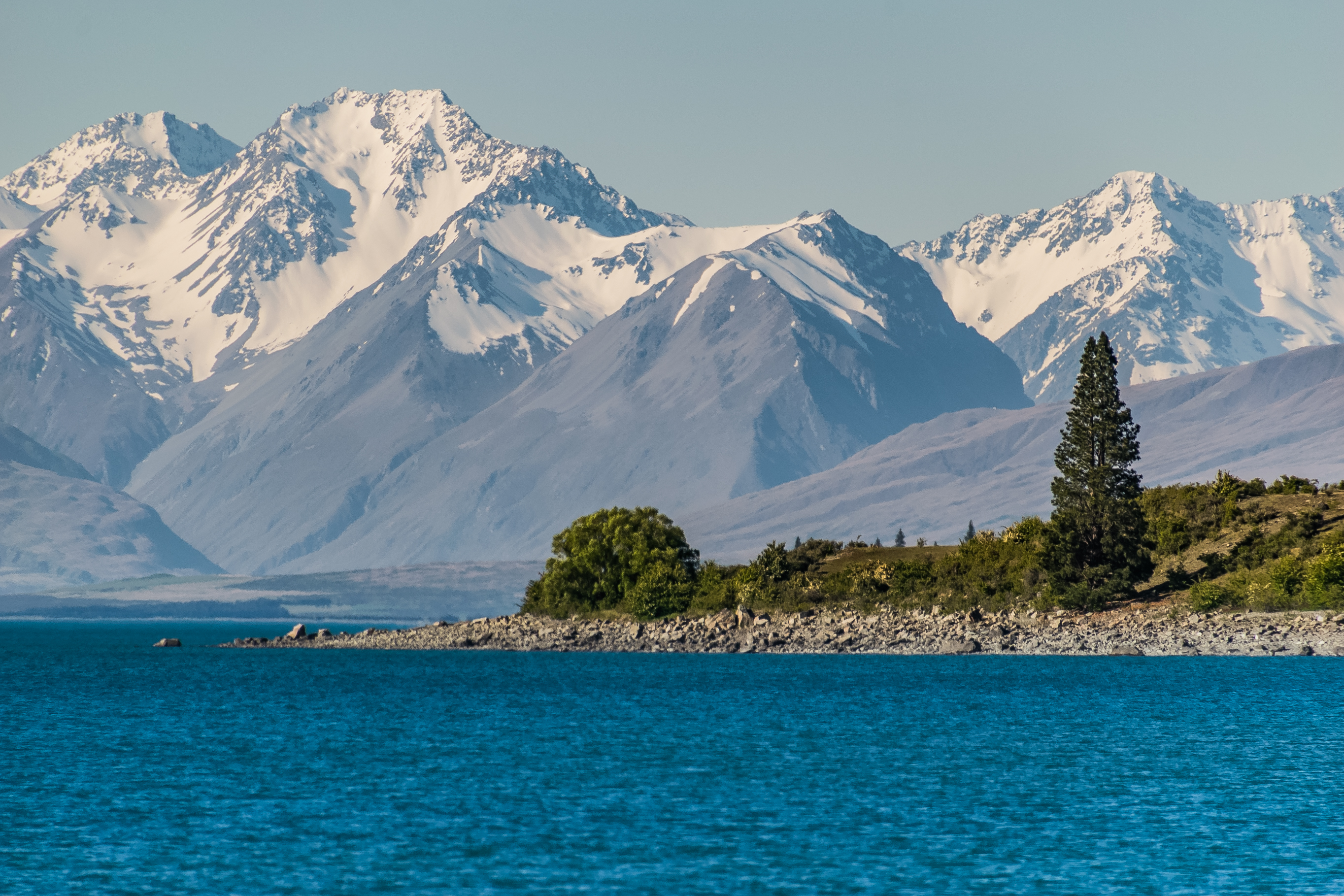
Mount Ross to left, with Mount Chevalier behind (upper left corner).
South aspect, from south end of Lake Tekapo.

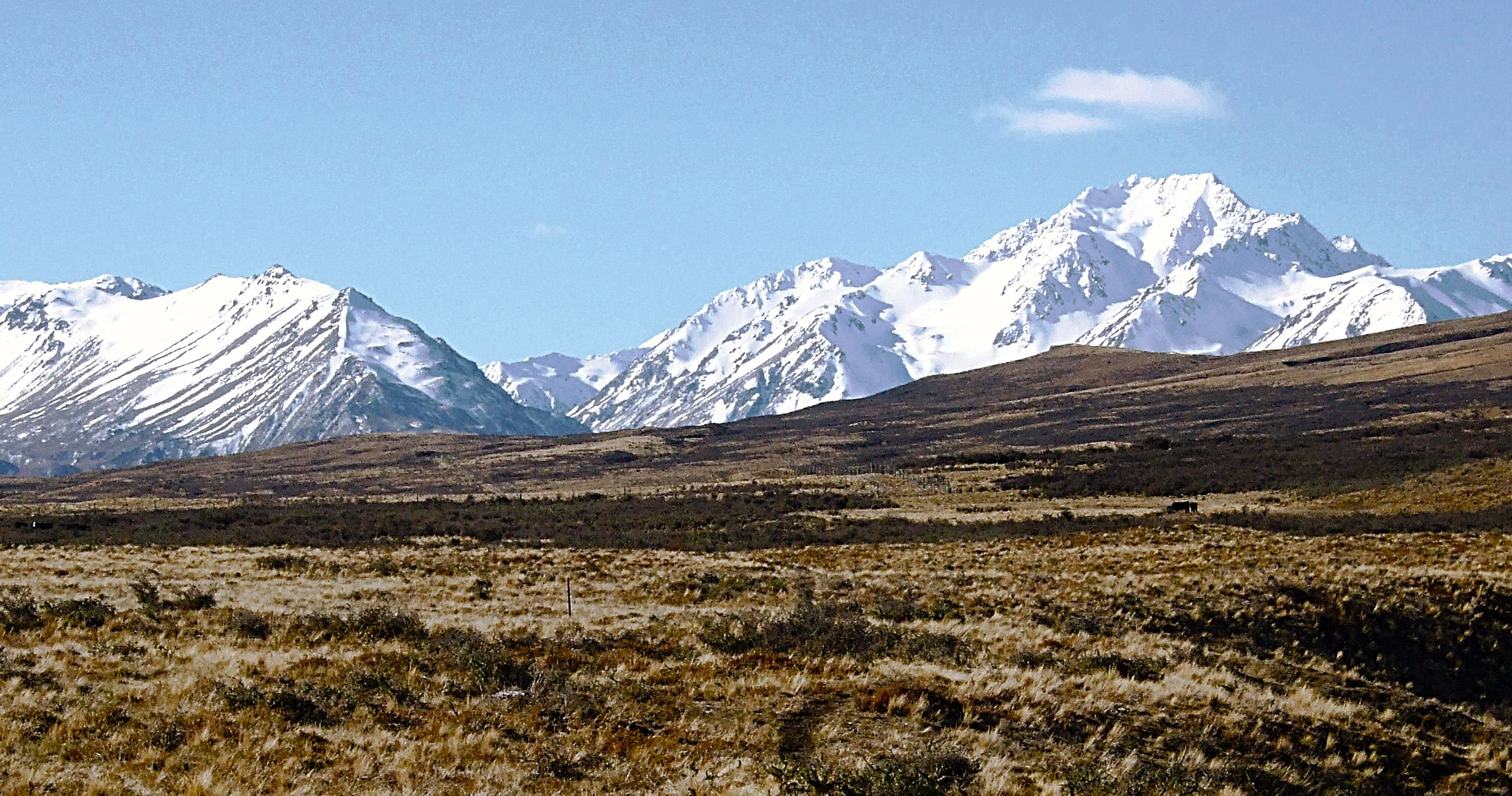
South aspect of Mount Ross to right

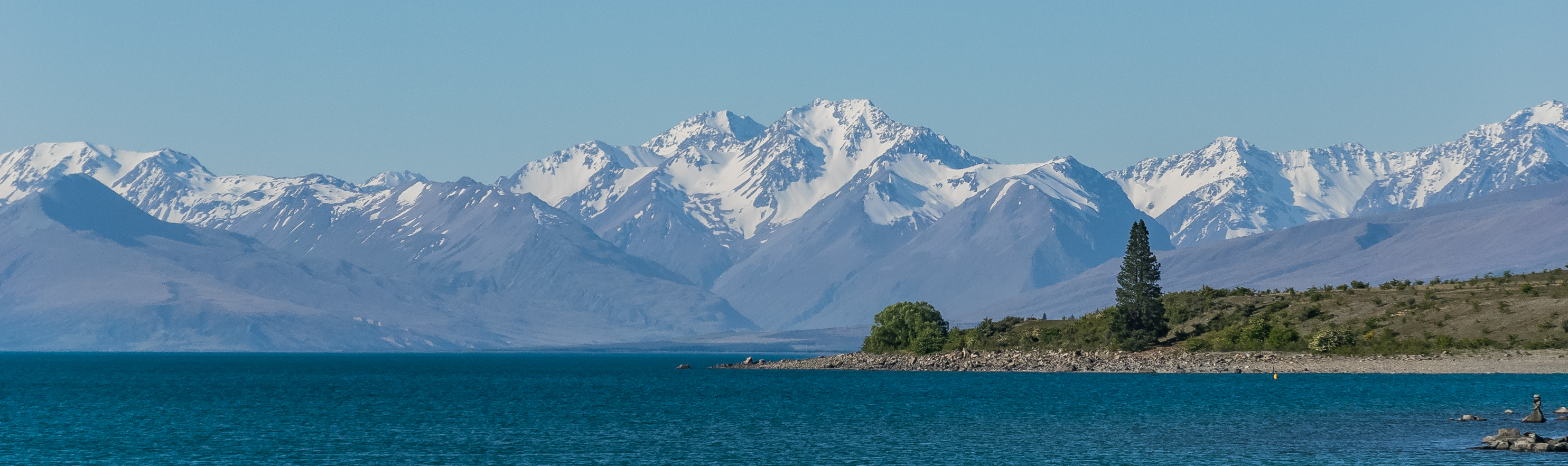
Mount Ross and Mount Chevalier centred, viewed from Lake Tekapo.
