= Mick Pomathios =

France international rugby union player

- Full name: Michel Pomathios
- Born: 18 March 1924 Bourg-en-Bresse, France
- Died: 7 December 2015 (aged 91) Bourg-en-Bresse, France
- Height: 6 ft 2 in (188 cm)
- Weight: 199 lb (90 kg)

Rugby union career
- Position: Wing three–quarter
International career
Years	Team	Apps	(Points)
1948–54	France	24	(18)

Michel Pomathios (18 March 1924 – 7 December 2015) was a French international rugby union player.

== Biography ==
=== Early years ===
Born in Bourg-en-Bresse, Pomathios attended Lycée Lalande and during World War II was a member of the French resistance. He got captured in 1944, but while being transported by car to the Gestapo was able to jump out and flee, likely saving him from execution. For his wartime actions, Pomathios was decorated with both the Croix de Guerre and Legion of Honour, receiving the latter from Jacques Chaban-Delmas.

=== Rugby career ===
Pomathios, a wing three–quarter, was a product of junior rugby at US Bressane and gained his international call up after joining SU Agen. He was capped 24 times for France between 1948 and 1954. In his first year of international rugby, Pomathios scored tries in wins over the Wallabies, Wales and England. The victory over Wales was the first achieved by a French team on Welsh soil. His career also included a tour of Argentina in 1949 and France's joint–championship winning 1954 Five Nations campaign. He has the distinction of being the first French player to appear for the English invitational team the Barbarians.

=== Later life ===
After retiring, Pomathios remained involved in rugby as both coach and president of US Bressane.

Pomathios, a physical education teacher by profession, was involved in politics, serving three terms as mayor of Laizé in Saône-et-Loire from 1965 to 1983.

== See also ==
- List of France national rugby union players
