= John Chevallier (physician) =

English physician and agriculturist

- Died: 14 August 1846
- Occupations: Physician and agriculturist

John Chevallier (died 14 August 1846) was an English physician and agriculturist.

== Biography ==
Chevallier was the youngest son of the Rev. Temple Chevallier. After qualifying as physician, he took orders and presented himself to the living of Aspall, which was in his own gift, in 1817. For many years he received deranged patients into the hall. He was much interested also in agriculture, and has the credit of having first cultivated and introduced to practical agriculture the celebrated Chevallier barley. He died on 14 August 1846.
