= Yves Bergougnan =

France international rugby union player

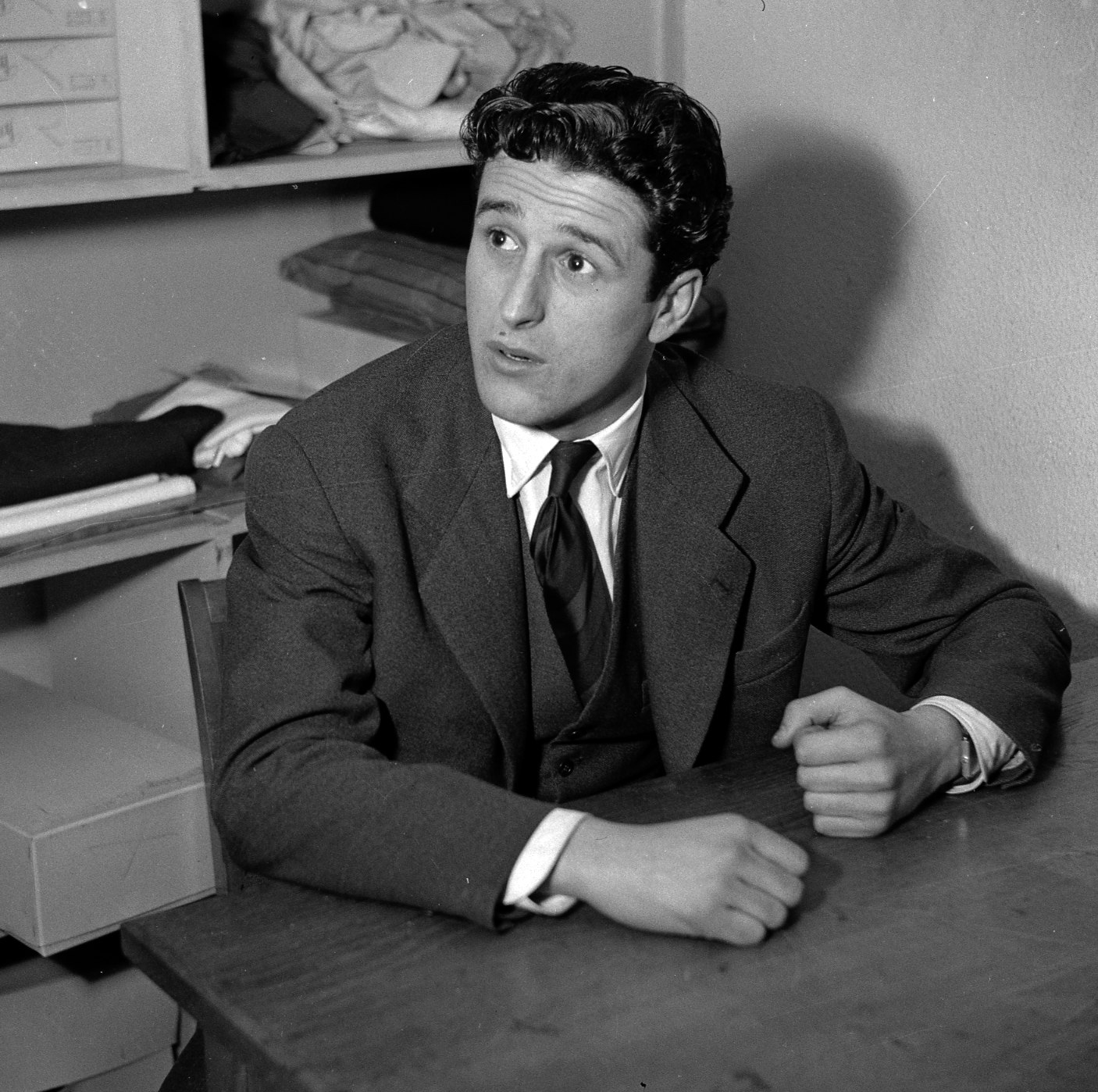
- Born: 8 May 1924 Toulouse, France
- Died: 15 April 2006 (aged 81) Toulouse, France
- Height: 1.78 m (5 ft 10 in)
- Weight: 74 kg (163 lb)

Rugby union career
- Position: Scrum-half
International career
Years	Team	Apps	(Points)
1945–49	France	17	(12)

Yves Bergougnan (8 May 1924 – 15 April 2006) was a French international rugby union player.

== Biography ==
Bergougnan was the son of noted Toulouse painter Raoul Bergougnan.

A scrum-half, Bergougnan was a left–footed player renowned for his kicking game. He trained during his youth with Gallia-Boys, the juniors of rugby league team Toulouse Olympique, which he made his senior debut for at age 19, before crossing to Stade Toulousain in 1945. During his time with Stade Toulousain, Bergougnan was part of their undefeated season in 1946-47, when they achieved the league and cup double.

Bergougnan's international career, spanning from 1945 to 1949, consisted of 17 caps, including away wins over Ireland and Wales. He also took part in France's 1949 tour of Argentina and was the last player to kick a four-point drop goal in an international match.

Prone to shoulder dislocations, Bergougnan retired from rugby aged 25.

== See also ==
- List of France national rugby union players
