= Marie-Renée Chevallier-Kervern =

French artist (1902–1987)

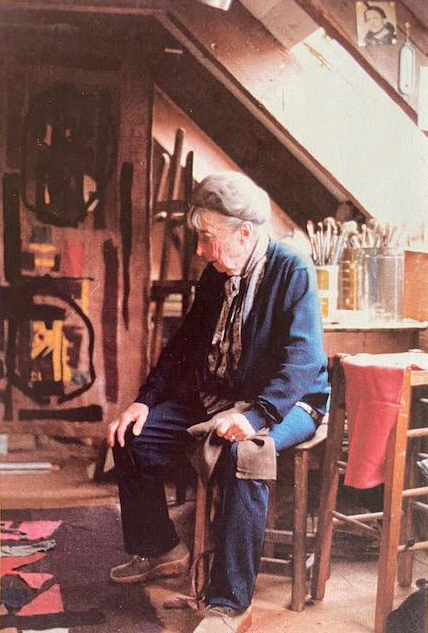
- Born: January 4, 1902; Landerneau, France
- Died: November 19, 1987 (aged 85); Brest, France
- Education: École des Beaux-Arts, Paris

Signature
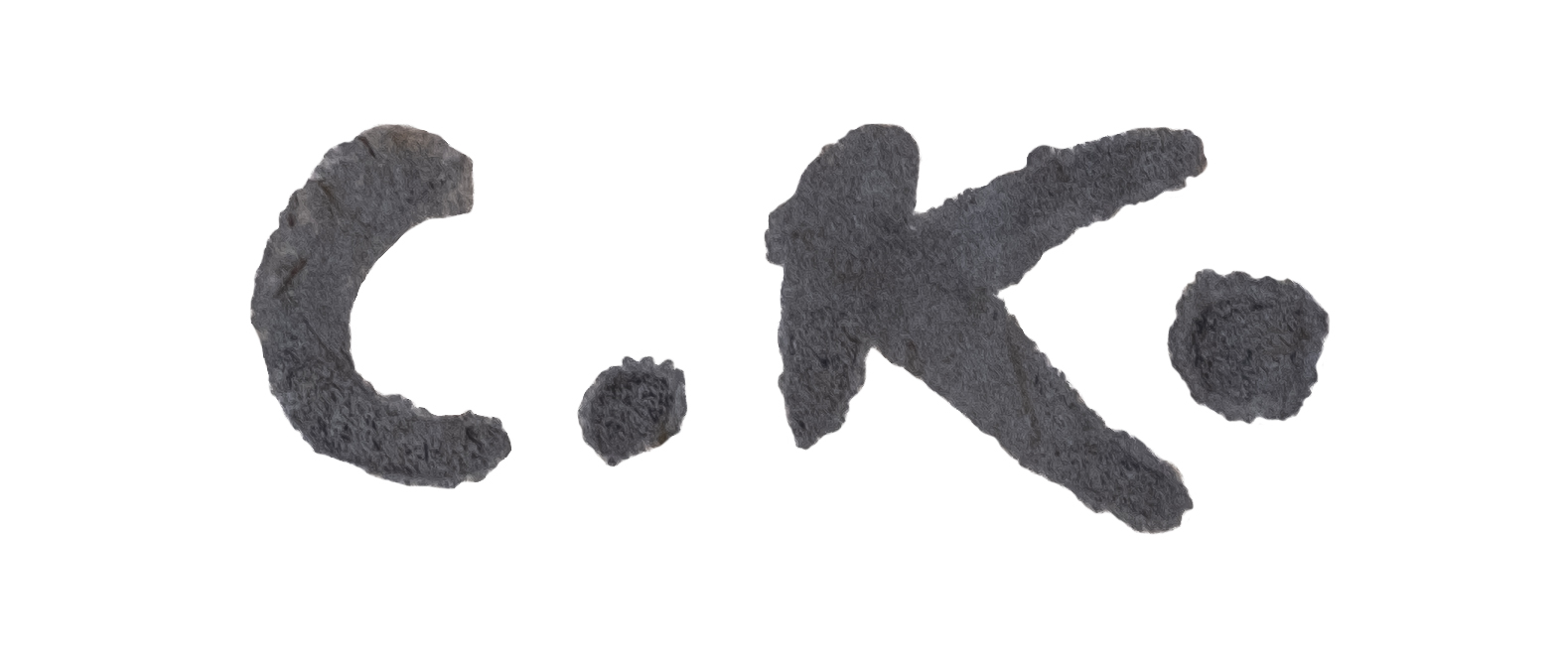

Marie-Renée Chevallier-Kervern (born January 4, 1902, in Landerneau; died November 19, 1987, in Brest) was a French painter, illustrator, engraver, and ceramicist. Working largely outside any one artistic movement, she moved through the major currents of 20th-century abstraction, leaving a substantial body of work in oils, gouaches, watercolors, drawings, notebooks, prints, and collages, before arriving at her étoffes cousues (sewn fabrics), in which the forms and colors of her painting carried over directly into textile compositions.

== Youth and education (1902–1924) ==
Born into a family steeped in art (her father and uncle were both accomplished painters, draftsmen, and watercolorists), Marie-Renée Kervern spent her early years between Paris and Amiens, taking refuge in Landéda (Finistère) at the outbreak of the First World War. In the 1920s she trained in Paris at the École des Arts Décoratifs and the Académie Colarossi, where she studied illustration under Bernard Naudin, and at the École Art et Publicité on the rue de Fleurus.

== Early artistic career (1925–1962) ==
In 1925, Marie-Renée Kervern held her first exhibition in Amiens. She began her artistic career working in woodcut and lithography, drawing her early subject matter from Finistère folk imagery – the religious pardons of Le Folgoët and Plougonven, women in traditional lace headdress, and the bearers of processional petit saint figures. In 1926, she married the architect Fernand Paul Chevallier and took his name alongside her own. She worked with him on sketches for advertising posters. From 1929 she joined the Salon des artistes français, exhibiting that year a series titled Le Folgoat. That same year, she made the acquaintance of André Chevrillon, who took a keen interest in her prints. Her research into Breton folk culture also put her in dialogue with the writer Charles Chassé, placing her within the broader intellectual tradition of Ernest Renan and Anatole Le Braz on Breton identity.

In 1932–34, she studied the traditional pottery of Lannilis and Plouvien (Finistère), a centuries-old craft then dying out. She worked with Gouez, one of the last remaining potters, based at Prat-Torchen in Lannilis, interviewed François Cueff of Prat-Torchen and Augustine Guizou of Kerizaouen, and assembled a notable collection of pottery-making tools. In 1935, she published a detailed article on traditional pottery in the Bulletin de la Société archéologique du Finistère.

She met Marguerite Sérusier (née Marguerite Gabriel-Claude) in 1934, at an exhibition of Breton artists at the "Bûcheron" in Paris, and the two formed a lasting friendship. In 1936, she moved back closer to her home region after her husband was appointed Chief Architect of the city of Brest. She became part of the lively Brest art scene of the time, befriending Gaston Chabal, an architect of Historic Monuments and president of the Amis des Arts; Jean Lachaud, curator of the museum and director of the École des Beaux-Arts de Brest; Émile Compard; and the young painter Jean Deyrolle, with whom she kept up a correspondence. She also came to know the young Charles Estienne, then a tutor and later an assistant history teacher at the Lycée de Brest, introducing him to modern painting, to writing on Impressionism, and to questions of artistic expression more broadly. Odile Vacherot, Estienne's first wife, taught drawing at the Lycée technique de Brest.

Around 1937, she set aside printmaking to focus increasingly on oil painting. Through the Société des amis des Arts, she helped organize a visit to Brest by the poet Max Jacob, a personal friend of Jean Lachaud, who gave a lecture on modern art opening the Brest painting salon on 21 May 1938. Jacob became friends with Chevallier-Kervern and visited her at Landéda, and admired her work greatly. From the mid-1930s, she also collaborated with the Henriot faïence workshop in Quimper, producing small round-relief statuettes of figures in traditional folk costume; her earliest known piece for the workshop, Femme de Plonéour-Trez, dates from 1939.

During the bombing of Brest in 1941 she took refuge at Kervenny in Landéda, where she produced an extensive series of portraits and still lifes in oil on paper. Many of her canvases from 1937–41 were exhibited in Nantes at the Galerie Mignon-Massart, but were destroyed when the city was bombed in September 1943. That same year, she visited Madame Saluden and Odile and Charles Estienne, who had taken refuge in Quimper. During this stay, Estienne took her to the back room of a well-informed antique dealer on the quay, where she first encountered early works by Jean Bazaine.

After the Liberation, as Estienne and Deyrolle moved to Paris and placed themselves at the center of the Paris School's abstraction movement, Chevallier-Kervern remained in Brest with her two teenage daughters and her husband, who was overseeing the construction of temporary housing for the war-devastated city. She would later say she regretted never returning to live in Paris, though she stayed connected to the contemporary art world partly through Deyrolle, who kept her informed of developments including the work of Nicolas de Staël. From 1948 onward, she and her husband took regular road trips across France, Spain, Portugal, and Germany, visiting Italy several times; these trips produced notebooks full of sketches and watercolors, and she began experimenting with new techniques as a result.

In December 1950, after three years out of public view, she showed new canvases (including L'Homme endormi and L'Enfant au violon) at the Galerie Raub in Brest. Critics were struck by the break with her earlier work.

In 1951, Chevallier-Kervern became a teacher at the École des beaux-arts de Brest. Between 1952 and 1954, her painting showed a gradual disintegration of figurative form, and her first fully abstract canvases appeared in 1955, described by contemporaries as a sudden crystallization of tendencies that had until then only been latent. On returning from Spain in April 1957 she began her first works in sewn fabric; and on returning from Germany in September 1961, her first paper collages. In August 1960 she traveled to Italy; on her return she painted a series of canvases inspired by Italian cities, generally regarded as the high point of her work in abstract oils.

In March 1962, the Galerie Arlette Chabaud in Paris gave her a solo exhibition. The critic André Lenormand placed her among the strongest painters working in a spiritually charged non-figurative idiom, alongside Alfred Manessier, Jean Bazaine, Gustave Singier, and Maurice Estève; David Ojalvo, then curator of the Musée des Beaux-Arts de Brest, wrote the exhibition's catalogue preface, praising the balance of mass and movement in her compositions. The exhibition did not achieve the success she had hoped for, in part because she refused to enlist the support of any fellow painters or critics. A severe depression followed, lasting two years, and she gave up her teaching post at the École des Beaux-Arts when the school moved to new premises.

== Later career (1962–1987) ==
From 1962 to 1977–78, she regularly sent works to Nantes for exhibitions at the Musée des Beaux-Arts organized by André Lenormand. In 1970–71 she took part in "Art contemporain de Bretagne occidentale", which also traveled to Kiel. In 1967, following her London series, she gradually gave up oil painting in favor of her works in sewn fabric. In 1969 she showed two works in the group exhibition "Art et Université", bringing together ten Brest painters at the Faculté des Lettres de Brest on the initiative of Jean Gaultier. That September, after Fernand Paul Chevallier stepped down as director of the École des Beaux-Arts de Brest, she left Brest and settled permanently at Aber-Wrac'h in northern Finistère.

In January–February 1970, the Musée de Brest devoted a solo exhibition to her, tracing her output from 1932 onward: oils, papiers collés, étoffes cousues, drawings, sketches, and engraved and enameled slate tiles, amounting to 183 pieces in total, none previously exhibited. The complete catalogue compiled by René Le Bihan for the exhibition remains to this day the most substantial publication on her work.

Her sewn-fabric technique, developed from 1957 onward, became her primary occupation for the last thirty years of her career. She considered these works paintings made by other means rather than a form of textile art, composing them directly without preliminary sketches. Unlike younger textile artists of the period such as Magdalena Abakanowicz or Sheila Hicks, who moved from the wall into three-dimensional space, she kept to a painterly, planar conception of the form. Unlike Roger Bissière, who left the sewing of his own textile works to his wife, she sewed every piece herself, treating the stitching itself as a form of drawing. She produced more than 120 sewn-fabric works between 1958 and 1987.

== Death ==
Marie-Renée Chevallier-Kervern died on 19 November 1987 after a brief illness. In a tribute published the following month, the art historian René Le Bihan wrote that she would "be recognized tomorrow" as one of the ten leading painters of the century in Brittany.

== Works cited ==
- Le Bihan, René (1970). Marie-Renée Chevallier-Kervern : œuvres de 1932 à 1969. Musée des beaux-arts de Brest.
- Podzemskaia, Nadia; Vinciguerra, Lorenzo (2026). Marie-Renée Chevallier-Kervern : l'élan vers l'absolu [Marie-Renée Chevallier-Kervern: The Drive Toward the Absolute]. 36 vues (in French). Locus Solus. ISBN 978-2-36833-644-1.
