= Mount Chevalier =

Mountain in Canterbury, New Zealand

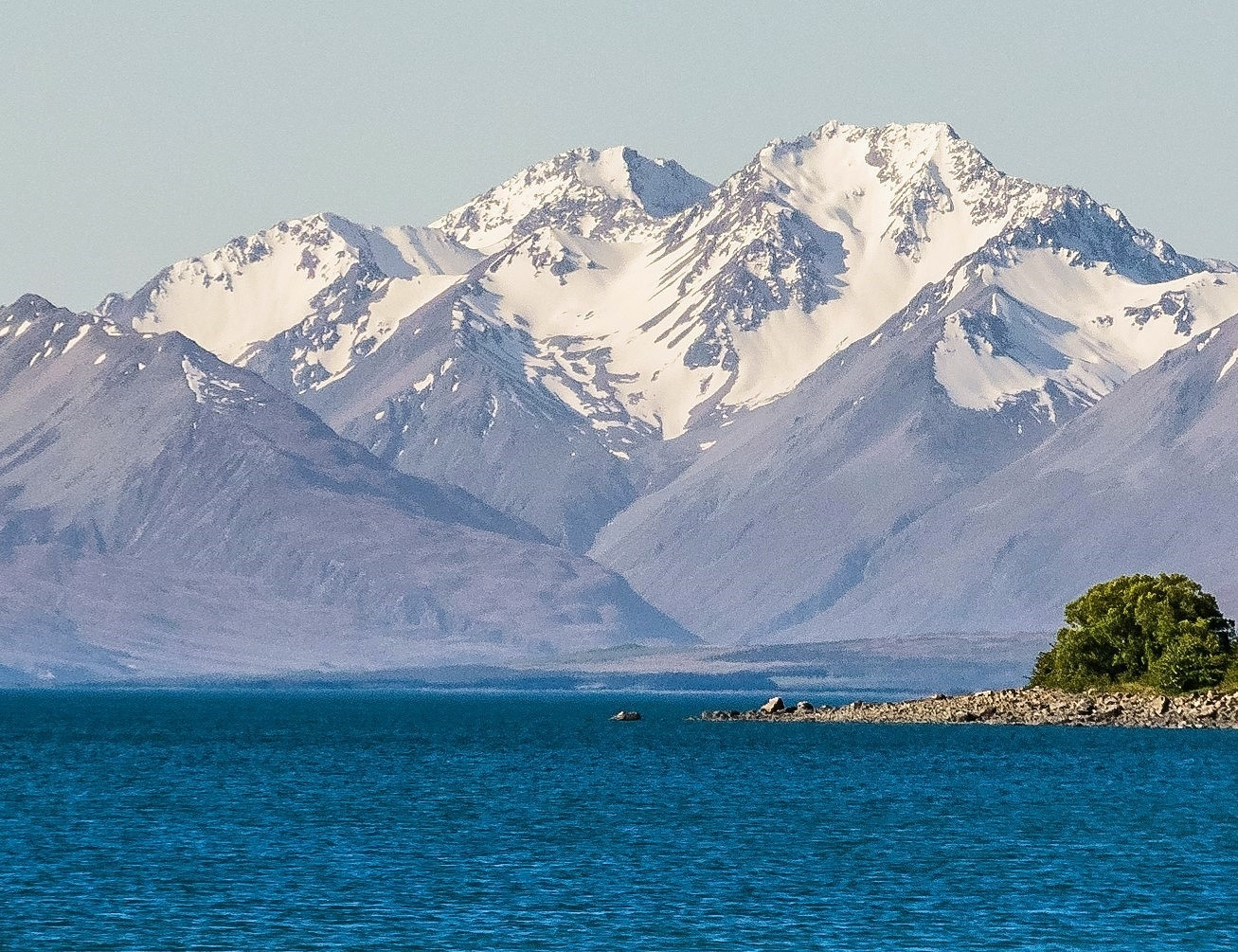
- South aspect, centred (Mount Ross to right)

Highest point
- Elevation: 2,404 m (7,887 ft)
- Prominence: 494 m (1,621 ft)
- Isolation: 5.89 km (3.66 mi)
- Listing: New Zealand #103
- Coordinates: 43.569078°S 170.651389°E

Naming
- Etymology: Nicholas Chevalier

Geography
- Location within New Zealand
- Interactive map of Mount Chevalier
- Location: South Island
- Country: New Zealand
- Region: Canterbury
- Protected area: Te Kahui Kaupeka Conservation Park
- Parent range: Southern Alps; Two Thumb Range
- Topo map: NZMS260 I36

Climbing
- First ascent: 1941

Mount Chevalier is a 2,404-metre-elevation (7,887-foot) mountain in Canterbury, New Zealand.

== Description ==
Mount Chevalier is part of the Two Thumb Range which is a subrange of the Southern Alps. It is located 185 kilometres (115 mi) west of the city of Christchurch in the Canterbury Region of the South Island. Precipitation runoff from the mountain drains west into the Macaulay River and east into North East Gorge Stream, which is a tributary of the Macaulay. Topographic relief is significant as the summit rises 1,400 metres (4,593 feet) above the Macaulay Valley in three kilometres. The nearest higher neighbour is Achilles Peak, six kilometres to the east. The mountain's toponym was applied by Julius von Haast to honour Nicholas Chevalier (1828–1902), a Russian-born artist who visited New Zealand in 1865. The first ascent of the summit was made in December 1941 by Bob Clark-Hall and J.L. (Pat) Clark-Hall via the South Face.

== Climate ==
Based on the Köppen climate classification, Mount Chevalier is located in a marine west coast (Cfb) climate zone. Prevailing westerly winds blow moist air from the Tasman Sea onto the mountains, where the air is forced upwards by the mountains (orographic lift), causing moisture to drop in the form of rain or snow. The months of December through February offer the most favourable weather for viewing or climbing this peak.

== Gallery ==
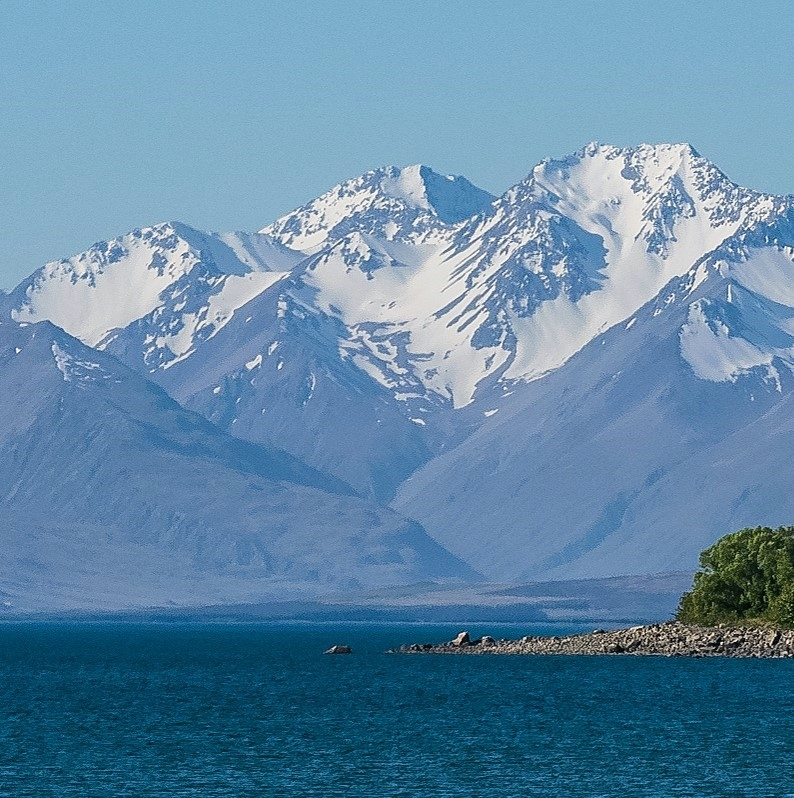
Mount Chevalier centred and Mount Ross to right, viewed from Lake Tekapo.

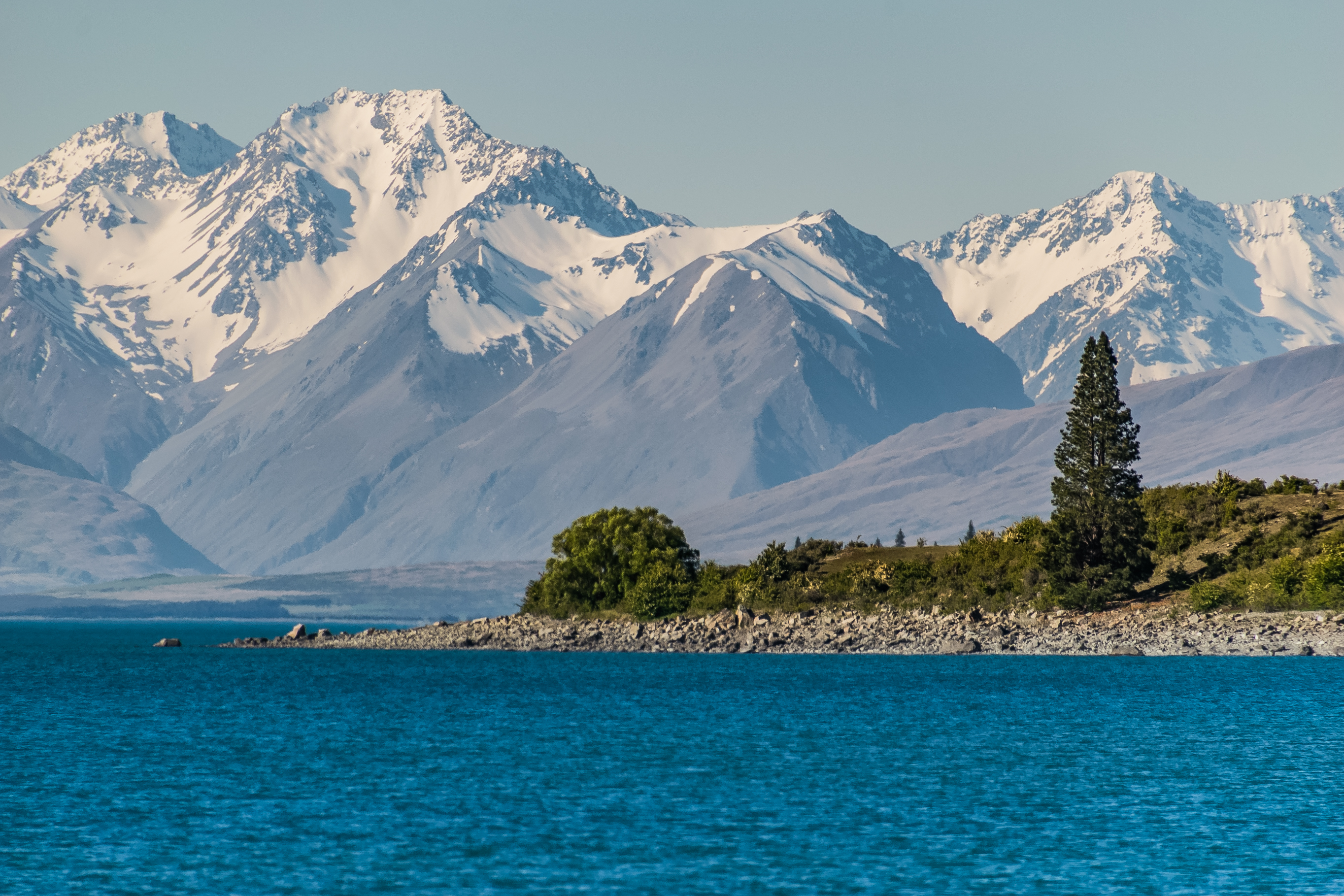
Mount Ross to left, with Mount Chevalier behind (upper left corner).
South aspect, from south end of Lake Tekapo.

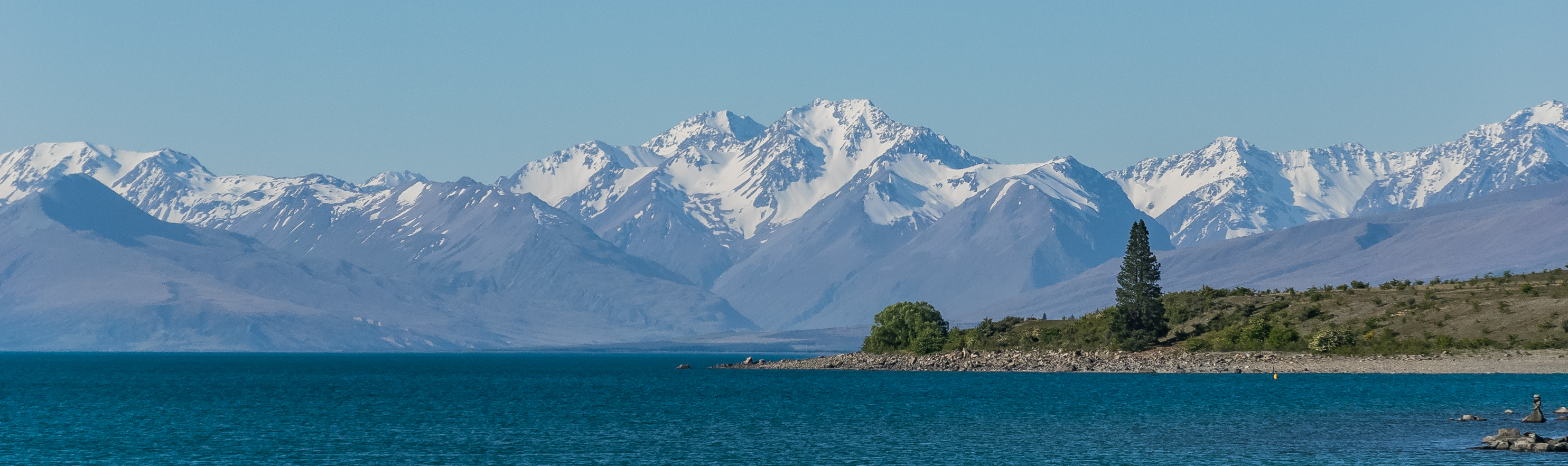
Mount Chevalier and Mount Ross centred, viewed from Lake Tekapo.

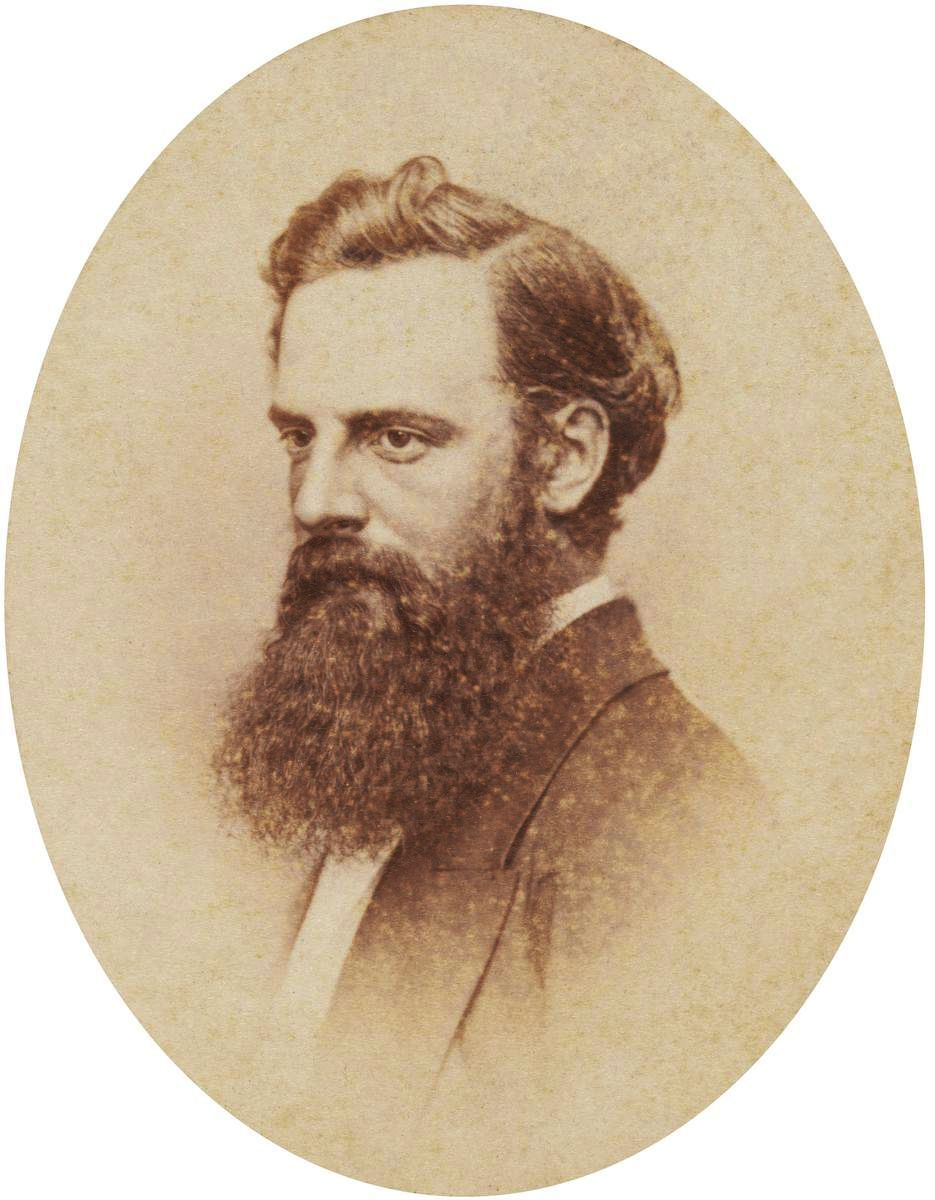
Nicholas Chevalier

== See also ==
- List of mountains of New Zealand by height
