= Aspall, Suffolk =

Village in Suffolk, England

Coordinates: 52.24304°N 1.17853°E

Aspall
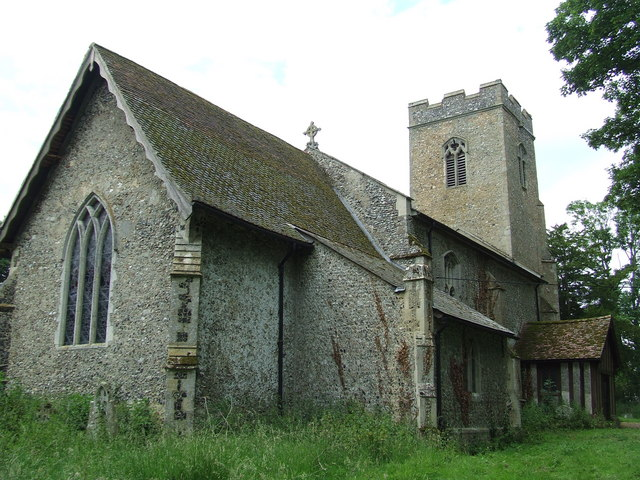
- Our Lady of Grace Aspall in 2009

- Location within Suffolk
- Area: 3.41 km^{2} (1.32 sq mi)
- Population: 60 (est. 2005)
  - Density: 18/km^{2} (47/sq mi)
- OS grid reference: TM171653
- District: Mid Suffolk
- Shire county: Suffolk
- Region: East
- Country: England
- Sovereign state: United Kingdom
- Post town: Stowmarket
- Postcode district: IP14
- Police: Suffolk
- Fire: Suffolk
- Ambulance: East of England
- UK Parliament: Central Suffolk and North Ipswich

Aspall is a village and civil parish in the Mid Suffolk district of Suffolk, England. According to the 2001 census it had a population of 52, and estimated population of 60 in 2005. The village is about 15 miles (24 km) north of Ipswich, and 12 mi (19 km) south of Diss.

The Domesday Book records the population of Aspall in 1086 to be 24 households made up of 5 freemen and 19 smallholders along with 60 pigs, 24 sheep, and 13 cattle. The lands that made up the village were held by Odo of Bayeux, Ranulf Peverel, Robert Malet.

Aspall Cyder is brewed here by the Chevalliers of Aspall Hall. Aspall Hall is one of four moated houses located within a mile – the others being Aspall House, Moat Farm, and Kenton Hall at Kenton, Suffolk.

Between 1908 and 1952 the village was served by Aspall and Thorndon railway station on the Mid-Suffolk Light Railway.

Sir Herbert Kitchener, then Governor-General of the Sudan, was created Baron Kitchener of Khartoum, and of Aspall in the County of Suffolk, on 31 October 1898.

== Notable residents ==
- Chevalliers of Aspall Hall
- Sir Francis Hepburn Chevallier-Boutell (1851–1937), engineer and sports manager, who served as President of the Argentine Association Football League between 1900 and 1906 was born in Aspall
- Emeric Pressburger (1902–1988), Hungarian British screenwriter, film director, and producer.
