= Club Universitario de Buenos Aires =

Argentine sports club

(Argentina) Universitario (CUBA)
- Full name: Club Universitario de Buenos Aires
- Union: URBA
- Nickname: CUBA
- Founded: 11 May 1918; 108 years ago
- Location: Buenos Aires, Argentina
- Ground(s): Villa de Mayo, Argentina
- Chairman: Marcelo Perri
- Coach: Juan Capdepont
- League: Top 14
- 2026: 9th.
Team kit

Official website
- cuba.org.ar

Club Universitario de Buenos Aires, commonly known for its acronym CUBA, is an Argentine amateur sports club haeadquartered in the city of Buenos Aires. Universitario hosts a large variety of sports and social activities that include aikido, artistic gymnastics, basque pelota, basketball, boxing, contract bridge, fencing, field hockey, football, gymnastics, golf, judo, mountaineering, paddle tennis, rugby union, squash, sailing, scuba diving, skiing, swimming, taekwondo, tennis, volleyball, wing foiling, and windsurf.

Rugby is one of the club's most representative sports, with the senior team currently competing in URBA Top 14, the first division of the Unión de Rugby de Buenos Aires (URBA) league system. CUBA has won 14 URBA titles to date.

Born as a gentlemen's club in 1918, the club did not allow the admission of women until 2018, when its statute was modified in an extraordinary assembly.

== History ==
=== Establishment ===
While a part of the university youth in Argentina was divided in favor of the allies or Germany (speaking of World War I), another in radical or conservative, or socialist and anarchist, a group of students wanted to stay away from these conflicts, seeking to channel youth sociability and dedicate themselves to sports, artistic and cultural activities. The founding students came from three sectors: those who were dedicated to artistic activities, those who wanted a sports club and those who fought to unite students in a club freed from politics. The movement that culminated in the creation of "Club Universitario de Buenos Aires" originated in the UBA's Faculty of Medical Sciences, the first to bring together university students without distinguishing careers, a uniting axis of students and professionals. From the beginning they defined that the club was only for university students, which was a sine qua non condition to join it.

On May 11, 1918, in a laboratory that university students Luis Agote Robertson and Lorenzo Galíndez had in a house on 1200 Avenida Corrientes, a group of 26 young people formed a private entity to bring together university students outside of the political turbulence. They deliberated until late into the night and once they agreed on the fundamentals they wrote the club's founding act. The first president of the institution was Dr. Carlos P.Waldorp. That same year, the first badge of the club is chosen from more than 20 drawings.

=== Consolidation ===
The practise of boxing (after the club was donated a ring) and rugby union started in 1919, despite the sport was banned in Argentina by then. The first CUBA's headquarters were located on Av. Corrientes 327, where the club settled down in 1920. Its facilities included rooms for billiards, boxing, fencing, wrestling, apart from a reading room and a hair salon. That same year, the gymnastics section was opened. In rugby, CUBA affiliated to the RPRU in 1921 after the club got a field to play their home matches (which was requested by the Union to allow affiliation). That same year, Universitario won the second division championship and promote to Primera.

In basketball, CUBA was a founding member of Federación Argentina. In 1921 the club was runner up in the championship. The club won the "Copa Félix Bunge" boxing cup in 1922 and 1923. CUBA was represented by two boxers at the 1924 Summer Olympics in Paris, Manuel Gallardo and Héctor Méndez, who won a silver medal.

The club acquired a land on Viamonte street to set its headquarters there. Construction began in late 1923. Five years later the club celebrated its 10th. anniversary in the recently opened heaquarters. That same year, the sailing section is opened. CUBA's sailors use other clubs to practise the sport so the club did not have a facility by then. Association football began its development also in 1928, with a group of enthusiasts coached by Alejandro Pavlovsky and Romualdo Alfiere. The sport has been practised at amateur level only so CUBA did not affiliate to the AFA.

In 1938 and after long negotiations, the club inaugurated the "Sede Núñez Hípico", a sports ground in the Núñez neighborhood of Buenos Aires that was owned by club Obras Sanitarias. Practise of volleyball started at CUBA in 1939, with the club affiliating to Federación Argentina one year later. Nevertheless the sport would be discontinued for several years. Tennis was added as sport at Sede Núñez, affiliating to Asociación Argentina de Tenis in 1944.

When the club's concession to use the Núñez Hípico facility ended in 1948, it was not renewed by the national government. After that, CUBA acquired a 37-hectare land in Villa de Mayo, a town in Malvinas Argentinas Partido to set its new headquarters. The first sport to be added in Villa de Mayo was golf in 1951. The government of Juan Perón took over the club in May 1953. The reason alleged was "To structure the association so that membership is open to all students and university students, without their economic means being an exclusionary factor." Because of the intervenction, many members left the club while some of its most notable athletes chose to play for other clubs. The intervenction ended following the Revolución Libertadora in 1955.

In 1959 CUBA opened "Sede Núñez", a sailing facility. Four years later, squash is added as sport in Viamonte headquarters. That same year the club acquired an abandoned facility –next to Velódromo Municipal– that had belonged to Club Industria y Comercio. Women's field hockey started its tenure in the club in 1968, opening a field in Villa de Mayo. By 1970 there was 70 players. New sports included scuba diving (1969), taekwondo (1973), and windsurf (1976). In the 1980s, CUBA opened a new facility in Fátima, a small town in Pilar Partido that included golf courses, tennis courts, and swimming pool. In 1991 the hockey team promoted to Primera División after defeating Banco Nación.

=== New millennium ===
The club rented a golf course to Club Los Cedros, located near the Villa de Mayo facility, in 2001. The 2000s saw the addition of new sports to the club such as artistic gymnastics (practised in Sede Palermo) in 2011, aikido (2014), mountaineering (2015, with a climbing wall in Palermo). Also in 2015 CUBA acquired a 16-ha land in Don Torcuato (where Buenos Aires Cricket and Rugby Club was located). In 2017 the club signed an agreement with the Government of Buenos Aires (GCBA) to build and operate a field hockey pitch with artificial turf surface. CUBA would be the exclusive operator of the pitch for a term of 5 years.

In 2018 (centennial of the club) more than 2,500 members attended an assembly at Sede Palermo where the statute was modified in order to allow the incorporation of university women as full members of the club. Until then, it was an "only-men" club. In 2024 the construction of a women's locker room in Sede Viamonte started.

CUBA added a new facility in 2019 when the club signed an agreement with Mar del Plata's Club Mar y Pesca. The facility was located in Punta Mogotes.

== Colors and badge ==
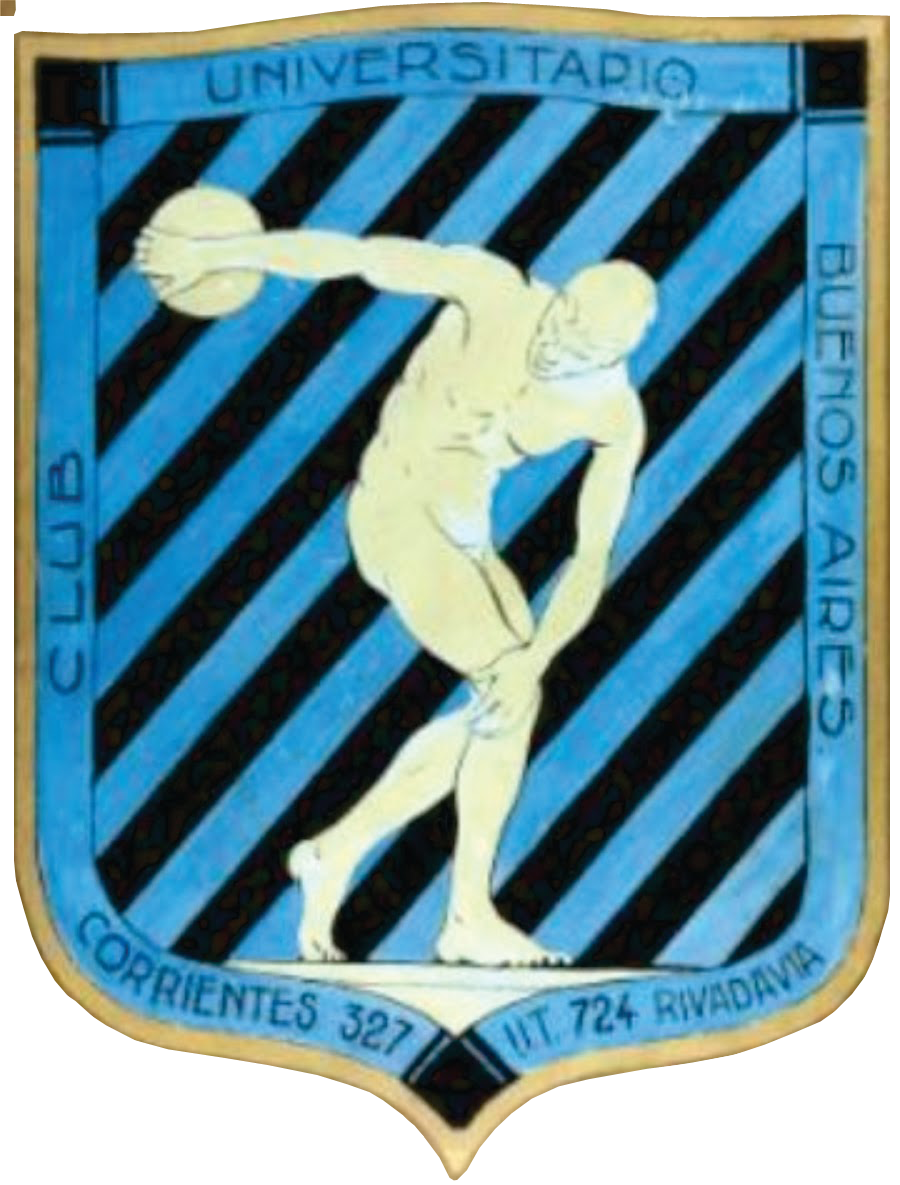
Club's first crest, 1918

CUBA has always used blue and black as its identity colors. The first known badge dates in 1918, being chosen among more than 20 drawings. It featured a discobolus figure over a blue and black background. The legend cited "Corrientes 327" referring to the club's first location on Avenida Corrientes.

This first badge was used until 1927, being replaced by the current emblem.

Blue and black were also the colors used by the CUBA's sports teams. The first rugby shirt featured small squares of both colors. It remained until 1930, when the four-square model debuted, that design has remained to present days.

== Facilities ==
Facility	Since	Sports practised	Notes	Ref.
Viamonte	1928	Basketball, basque pelota, boxing, football, judo, squash, swimming, taekwondo	Officially, "Sede Central", club's headquarters.	
Fátima	1991	Golf, swimming, tennis	The building was built due to the increasing number of members needing an alternative to Villa de Mayo. Facilities are located in a gated community.	
Núñez	1959	Football, gymnastics, rugby, tennis, volleyball, windsurf, yachting	Opened to host sailing and yachting mainly so members did not have an own facility where to practise those sports.	
Palermo	1965	Basketball, beach volleyball, football, gymnastics, paddle tennis, squash, swimming, taekwondo, tennis	The land had been occupied by the Argentine Air Force until October 1963, when the Government of Buenos Aires gave it to the club, under concession.	
Villa de Mayo	1951?	Rugby, swimming	Universitario settled there after club Obras Sanitarias refused to extend concession of the "Sede Núñez Hípico".	

Apart from the sports venues, CUBA has other facilities for recreational or tourism purposes in Villa La Angostura., Catedral, placed in the major tourism centre of Bariloche, and Mar del Plata in the beach of Punta Mogotes.

Sede Viamonte
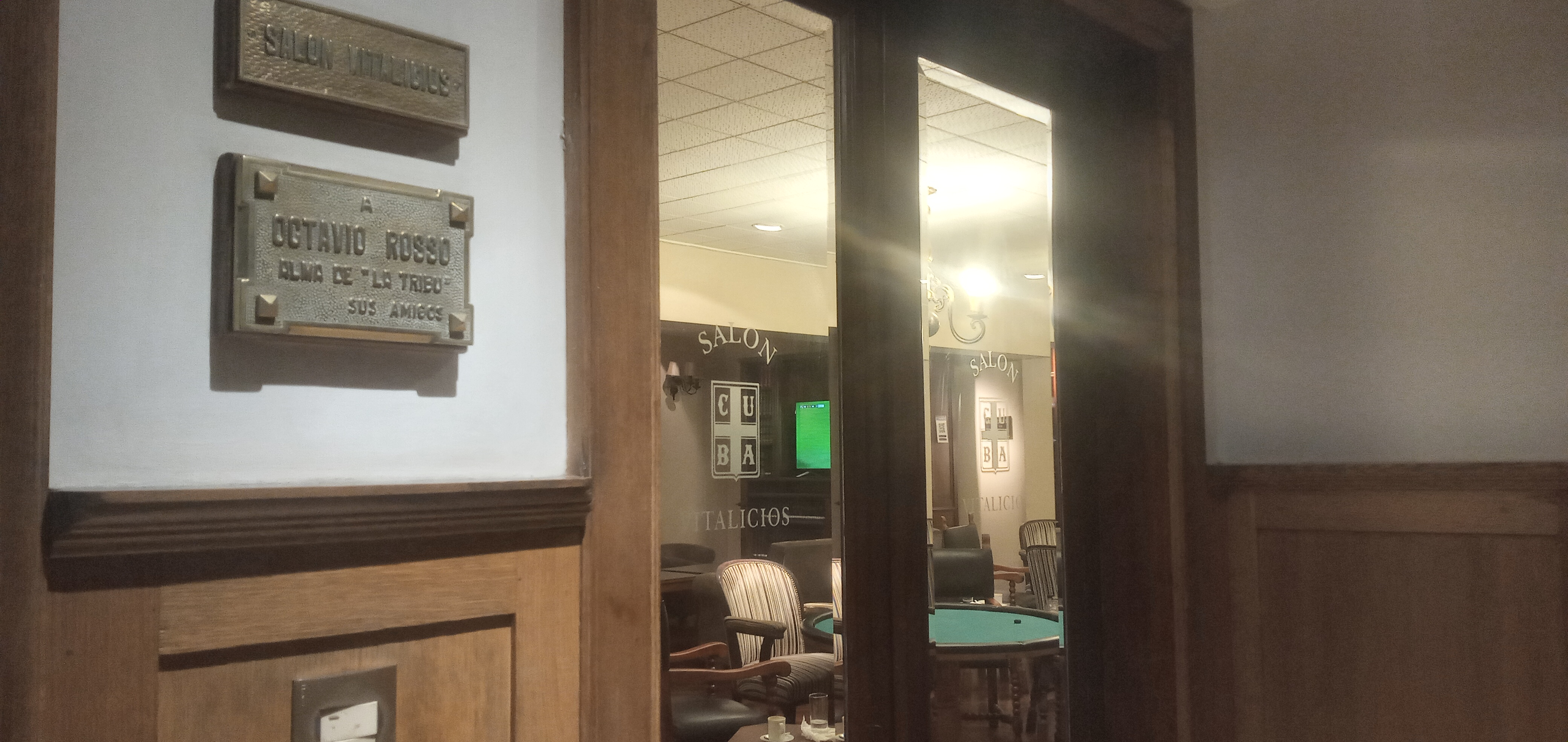
Entrance

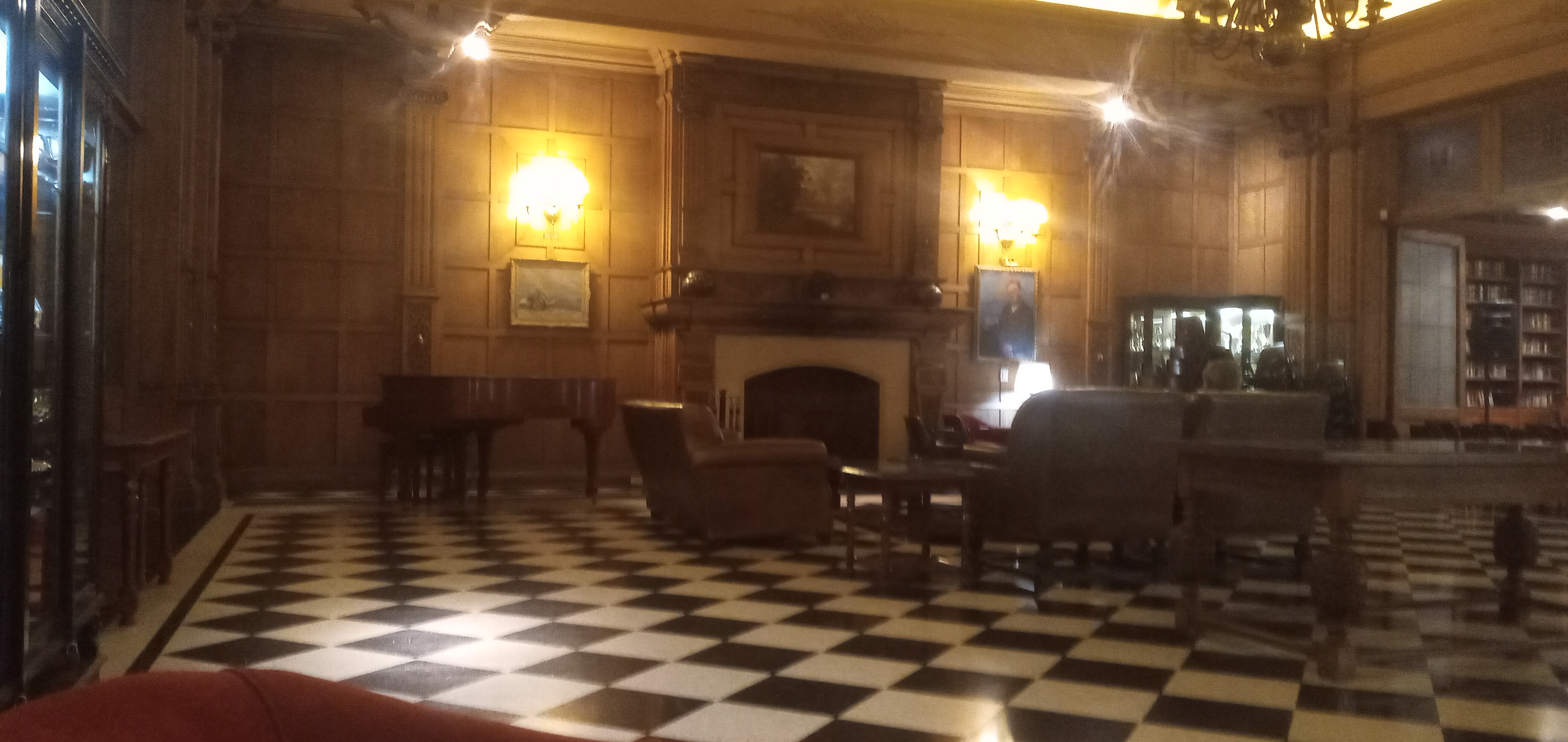
Reading room

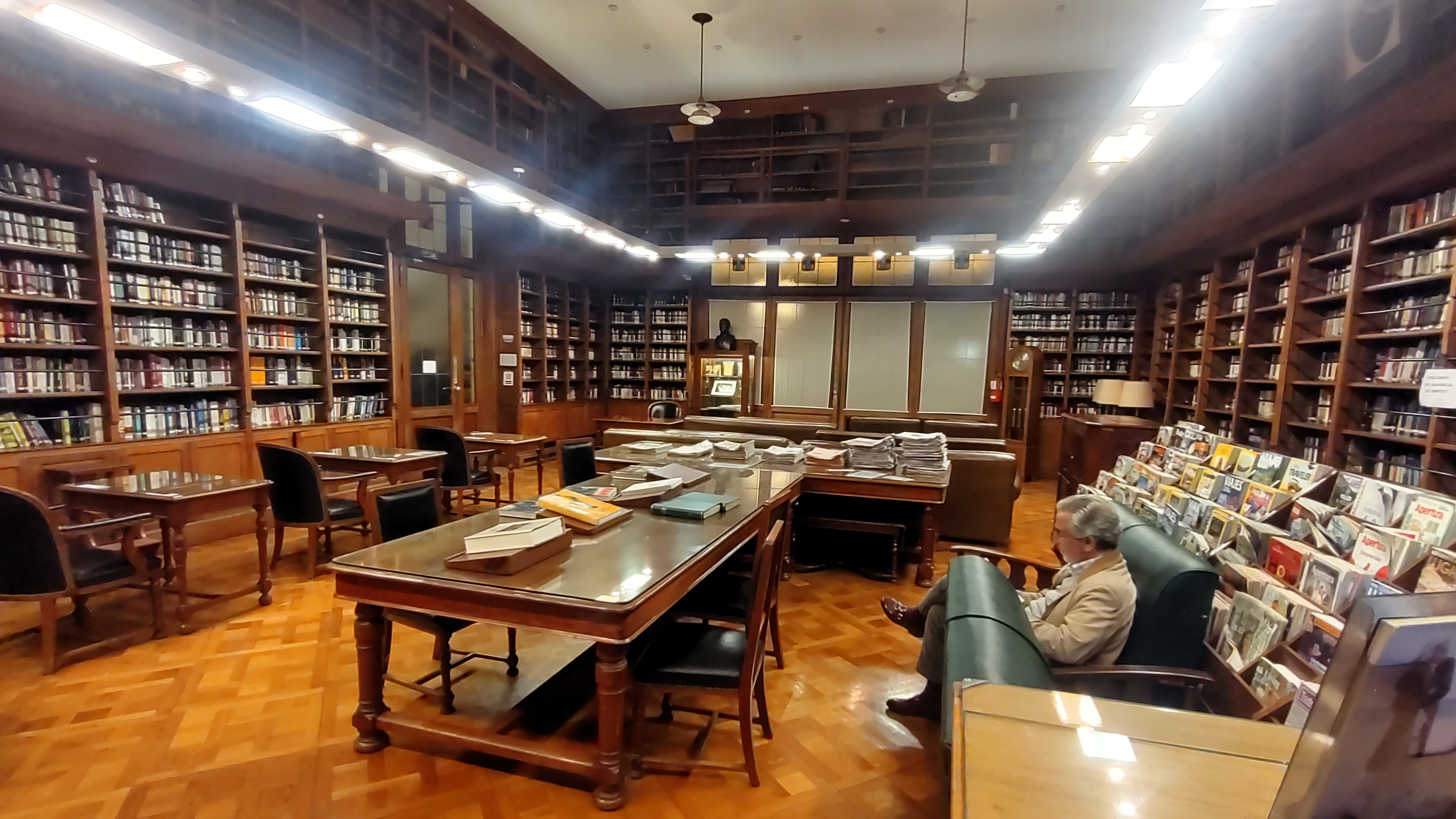
Library

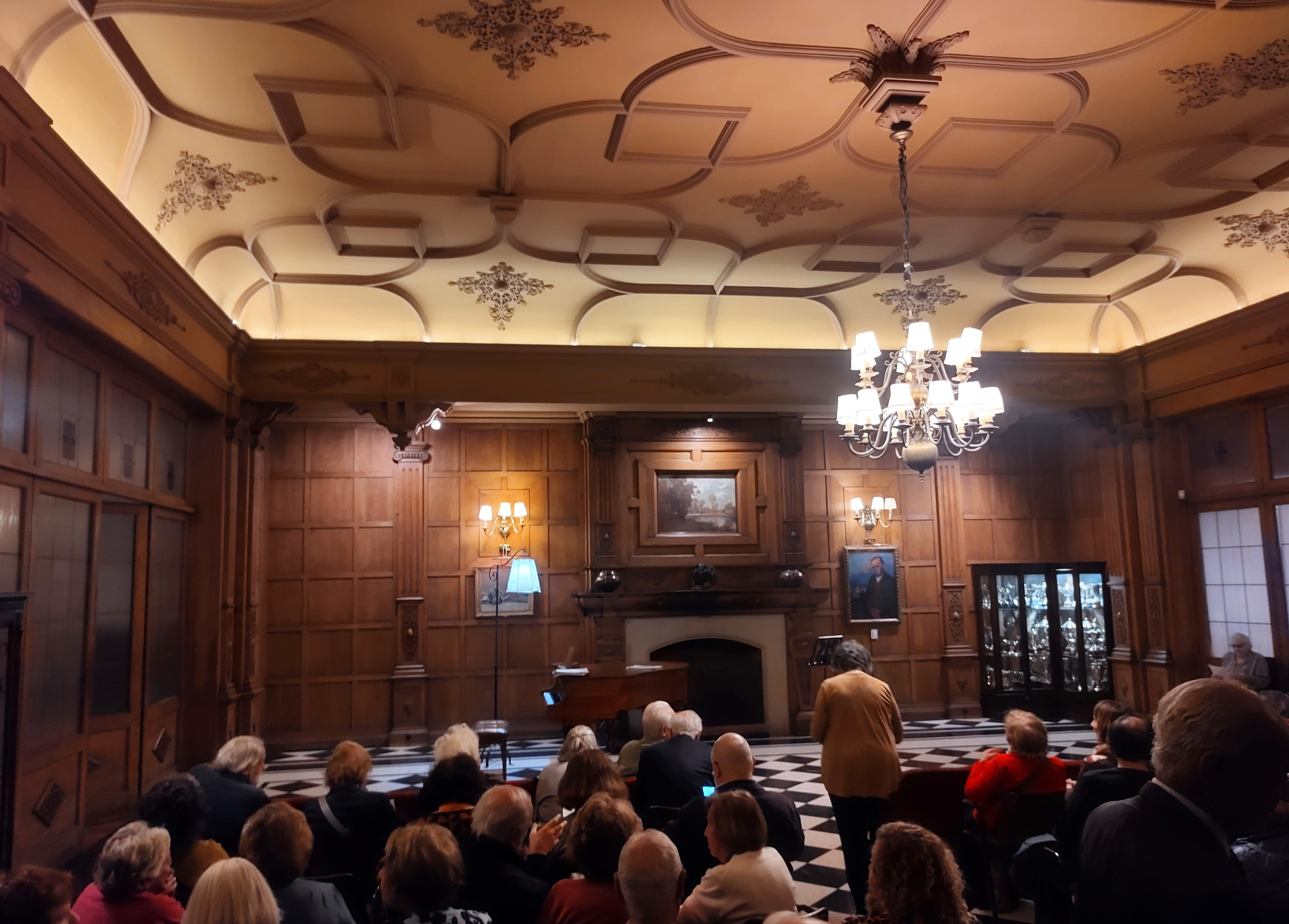
Events room

== Rugby ==
=== Beginning ===
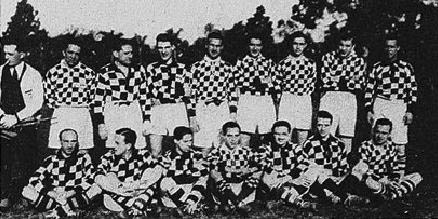
Universitario rugby team of 1924 with the original shirt, wore until 1930

It is believed that rugby was first played at the club because of the friendship between members of Club Atlético San Isidro and the founders of Universitario. The first rugby captain was Oscar Mena, who had previously played in San Isidro. Mena served as a coach of junior divisions in addition to playing on the senior team.

Universitario first registered its rugby team with River Plate Rugby Union (today Argentine Rugby Union) in 1919. Initially the team only played friendly matches, debuting against Lomas with a victory of 16–3. Universitario also played games against San Isidro and Belgrano AC.

Universitario began to play in official competitions in 1922, starting in the second division of the Argentine Rugby Union (UAR). The first official game was on 15 May 1921, with Universitario defeating Huemac by 11–0. Universitario won every game in its opening season, leading to a championship win as well. This promoted Universitario to the top division of Argentine rugby. Only two players of that initial team had experience playing rugby, Julio Dellepiane Rawson and Rodolfo de Surra, who had played in San Isidro and Eastbourne College of England respectively.

=== First championship and government's take over ===
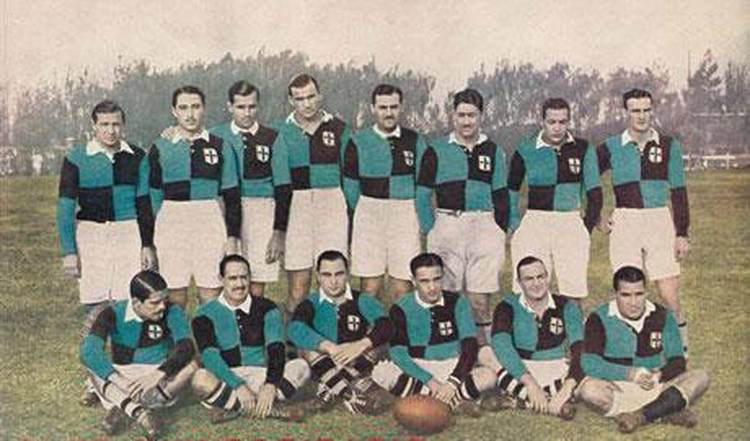
The 1931 team that won the RPRU championship

Universitario won its first title in the first division in 1931. During the season, Universitario scored 213 points (43 tries), receiving 77. The team won 14 of 16 games, with a loss to the standing champions San Isidro by 25–0 with 7 tries conceded, and 1 game drew against Gimnasia y Esgrima de Buenos Aires).

The catastrophic defeat to San Isidro (CASI) created great concern inside the club. To change the attitude of the players, Paco Torino, leader of club's sports committee, wrote a letter to each one of them with these words: "If you really don't want that CUBA be defeated like that again, you should better go to the practice and gymnastics class at the club."

— Hugo Mackern, Argentine journalist specialized in rugby

Universitario recovered from their defeat by San Isidro, winning all games in the second round, including a victory against San Isidro by 12–6.

The club consolidated its position in rugby in the 1940s, winning eight RPRU championships in ten years (1942–1952), also winning the 1951 title remaining unbeaten. When the government leaded by Juan Perón took over the administration of CUBA in May 1953, the rugby players expressed their disconformity with the decision so on June 7, they travelled to the city of Hurlingham to play against local team Curupaytí, but before the match started, they refused to play alleging they did not want to represent "the controller's team", then abandoning the field. Some minutes later, the players returned to the pitch under the name "Águilas Rugby Club". They told the referee they would play the match under other name, which was accepted by Curupaytí's players.

CUBA's ontroller Guillermo Guilhe reacted to that suspending 16 senior players, apart of forbidding CUBA's all divisions to compete for an indefinite period. Nevertheless, CUBA continued to attending matches using pseudonyms. After controller Guihle disaffiliated CUBA from the UAR, the CUBA players were offered to play for Atalaya Polo Club, an entity in La Horqueta (San Isidro Partido), which they accepted. It was agreed that all players would return to CUBA when the takeover ended. The "Atalaya-CUBA" team won the second division championship in 1954, promoting to Primera División after beating Los Tilos. Atalaya made a good campaign in the 1955 Primera season. That same year the Revolución Libertadora overthrew the Juan Perón government and two months later the controller resigned. Soon after the UAR allowed CUBA to return following a decision from all its clubs. Atalaya, without the CUBA players, could not repeat the good campaign of the previous season and was relegated. The club abandoned the practise of rugby in 1969.

At the international level, Universitario played several matches against teams outside Argentina. These teams included the Junior Springboks in 1932 and 1959, an Oxford & Cambridge combined team in 1948, 1956 and 1965, the Ireland national side in 1952, and the "Gazelles" from South Africa in 1966. in 1965, Universitario won the title in all divisions (first to fifth, including reserve teams).

=== Return to glory ===
Universitario would not win another title until 2013, 43 years after its last title. In 2006 and 2007 the team reached the semi-finals, but in 2010 and 2011 the team was nearly demoted to a lower division. In 2011, to remain in the top division, Universitario had to play a match against Lomas.

In 2013 Universitario won its 14th championship, defeating Hindú by 11–9 in San Isidro. That same year Universitario became the national champion when winning the Nacional de Clubes after defeating Rosarian team Duendes 21–20 at a final match played in Villa de Mayo.

=== Notable rugby players ===
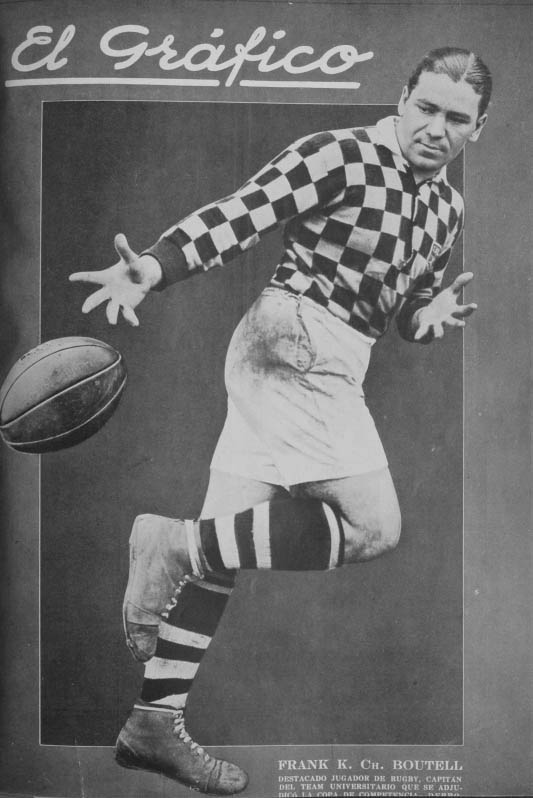
Frank Chevallier Boutell in 1926

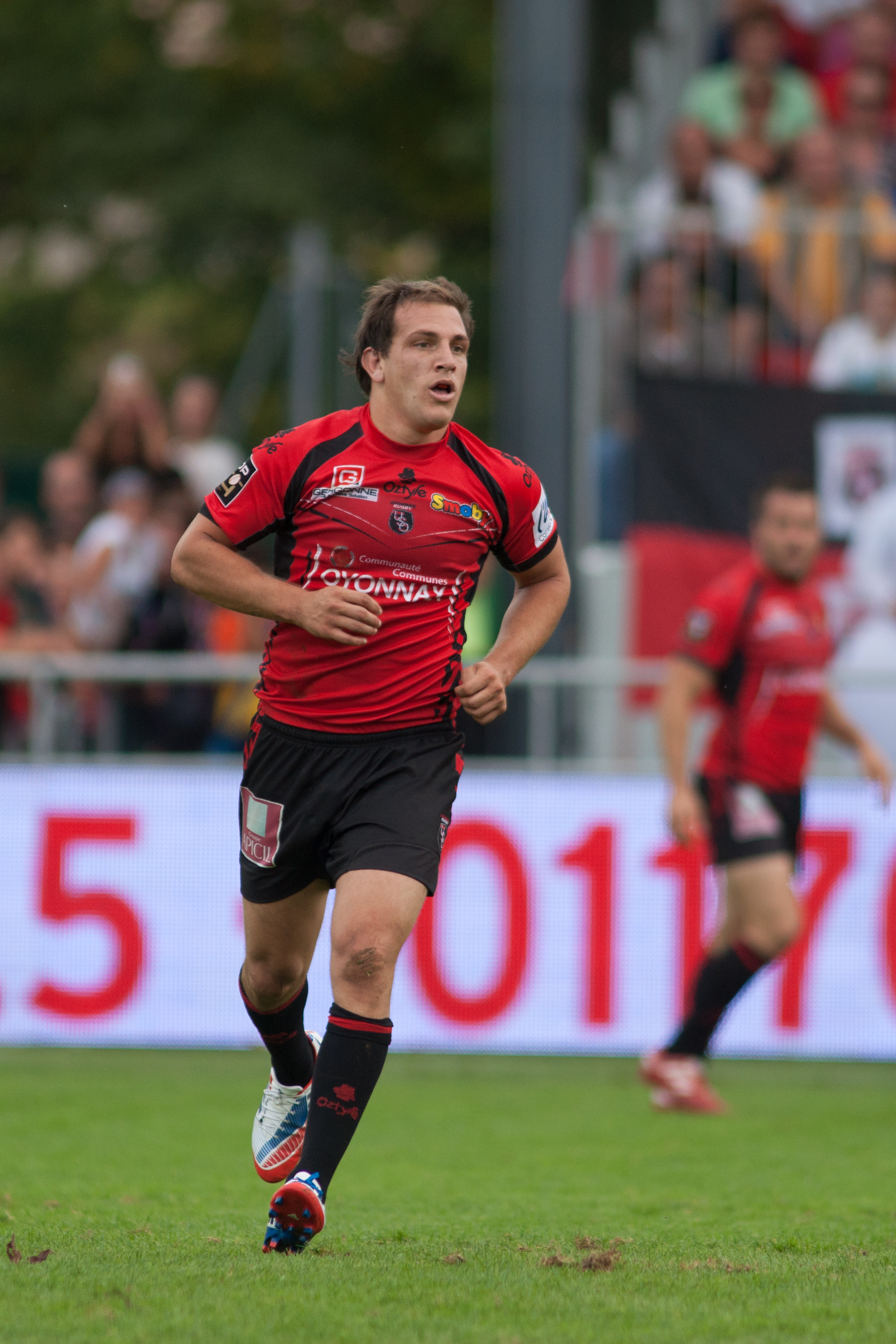
Benjamin Urdapilleta in 2013

- Frank Chevallier Boutell
- Ignacio Corleto
- Ernesto Ure
- Hugo Miguens
- Bernardo Miguens
- Javier Miguens
- Pedro Lanza
- Juan Lanza
- Elías Gaviña
- Ricardo Mastai
- Felipe Aranguren
- Benjamín Urdapilleta
- Tomás de la Vega
- Facundo Bosch
- Matías Moroni

== Notable members ==
- Natalio Botana (Note: Founder and director of Crítica, a famous newspaper of Argentina.)
- Alfredo Davicce (Note: Chairman of Club Atlético River Plate (1989–97).)
- Fernando de la Rúa
- Eduardo Pavlovsky
- Lino Palacio
- Rolando Hanglin
- 'Che' Guevara

== Controversies ==
Through the years, Universitario has been involved in some controversies, such of them were:

=== Men's-only club ===
Until 2018, Universitario was a gentlemen's club, with women being considered adherent members. As adherents, women are excluded from decision-making processes, and their access to the main headquarters is restricted to only the restaurant and the library. The sports and activities were exclusively available to men. The statute of Universitario (written in 1921) did not mention that women are not allowed in the club, however the club leadership interprets that the word "member" did not apply to women, limiting them to the adherent role.

If a member died, their adherents (wives and daughters) could only access the club with special permission from the governing committee. If a member got a divorce, their adherent (ex-wife) was banned from the club.

The situation changed in 2018, when the club's statute was modified in order to allow women to become full members of the entity. As part of the process, women's locker rooms were built in Sede Viamonte in 2024, at a cost of AR$100 million.

The club has also been accused of supporting several de facto governments of Argentina. In 1953, then President of Argentina Juan Domingo Perón took over the club. In the official history of the club it was stated that "The government of Gral. Pedro Aramburu repaired the abuse committed". In 1968, some members of the committee celebrated the 50th anniversary of the club with members of the military government led by dictator Juan Carlos Onganía.

=== 2013 Terenure match ===
In 2023, the visiting Terenue rugby team accused Universitario of "punching and gouging" during a match. Terenure were on a three-match tour in Argentina, but their opening game was called off after 25 minutes, with the Terenure leading 7-0. Terenure coach Sean Skehan stated that "the Terenure players felt if they had reacted to the many instances of physical provocation, the physical imbalance of the sides which greatly favoured Terenure would have resulted in serious injury being inflicted upon the CUBA club’s players" so they decided to withdrawn the game.

== Honours ==
=== Basketball ===
- Copa E.W. O'Farell (1): 1927
- Torneo Nacional (3): 1934, 1940, 1944

=== Rugby union ===
- Torneo de la URBA (15): 1931, 1942, 1944, 1945, 1947, 1949, 1950, 1951, 1952, 1965, 1968, 1969, 1970, 2013, 2021
- Nacional de Clubes (1): 2014

== See also ==
- University of Buenos Aires
