= Aspall Cyder =

Cider company

- Location: Aspall, Suffolk, England
- Opened: 1728
- Owned by: Molson Coors
- Website: aspall.co.uk

Aspall Cyder Limited (known as Tudortyne Limited from June–July 1986 and Aspall Cider Limited from July–September 1986) is a manufacturer of cider and other apple derived products. Its cidery is located at Aspall Hall in the village of Aspall, Suffolk, England. It was bought by the Canadian-American multinational drink and brewing company Molson Coors in 2018.

== History ==
The business was originally established in the early-18th century. Production was based on apple trees initially introduced for the use of the Chevalliers of Aspall Hall, the owners of the estate, from their native Jersey in the Channel Islands. In 1946 the company was a founding member of the registered charity, the Soil Association.

In addition to cider, Aspall also produce an unfermented apple juice, organic apple cider vinegar and apple-based balsamic vinegar. The company also imports and markets: Spanish red wine vinegar and white wine vinegar, and an Italian organic balsamic vinegar.

In 2018, Aspall was bought by the Molson Coors brewing company, ending 290 years of independently owned manufacturing.

In a January 2019 BBC interview, Aspall manager Dale Scott revealed a £10 million investment plan to improve the site's facilities. Improvements would include a new processing building, weighbridge for vehicles and extra storage tanks.

== Range ==
=== Aspall Cyder ===
- Aspall Draught Suffolk Cyder (5.5% ABV) – available on draught or bottled
- Aspall Organic Suffolk Cyder (6.8% ABV) – bottled only
- Aspall Premier Cru Suffolk Cyder (6.8% ABV) – bottled only
- Aspall Vintage Imperial Cyder (8.2% ABV) – bottled only
- Aspall Crisp Apple Cyder (4.5% ABV) - 330ml cans only
- Aspall Perronelle's Blush Suffolk Cyder (5.4% ABV) – available on draught or bottled (made with crème de mûre, a blackberry liqueur)
- Aspall Hot Spiced Cyder (4.7% ABV) – 5 litre box only
- Aspall Mulled Suffolk Cyder (3.8%) – 20 litre box only
- Aspall Harry Sparrow Cyder (4.6% ABV) – bottled only
- Aspall 1728 (11.0% ABV) – bottled only (limited edition sparkling cider)

=== Pip & Wild Cyder ===
- Strawberry & Rose (4.0% ABV) – bottled only
- Blackberry & Nettle (4.0% ABV) – bottled only

=== Cyder Vinegar ===
- Raw Apple Cyder Vinegar with Honey
- Raw Organic Apple Cyder Vinegar
- Organic White Wine Vinegar
- Organic Red Wine Vinegar
- Organic Balsamic Vinegar
- Apple Balsamic Vinegar
- Sauvignon Blanc White Wine Vinegar
- Classic White Wine Vinegar
- Classic Cyder Vinegar
- Classic Red Wine Vinegar
