= 2012 IRB Junior World Championship squads =

International rugby union players

The 2012 IRB Junior World Championship was an international rugby union tournament held in South Africa from 4 June until 22 June. The tournament was open to players who were born in or after 1992. This article lists the official squads for the 2012 IRB Junior World Championship in South Africa.

== Pool A ==
=== Fiji ===
Fiji's 28-man squad for the 2012 IRB Junior World Championship.

Head Coach: Sale Sorovaki

Note: Flags indicate national union for the club/province as defined by World Rugby.

Player	Position	Date of birth (age)	Caps	Club/province
Semi Keli	Hooker	9 January 1992 (aged 20)		(Fiji) Nabua
Etuati Qadrodro	Hooker	26 February 1992 (aged 20)		(Fiji) Army
Jale Sassen	Hooker	6 September 1992 (aged 19)		(Fiji) Vunimono
Alex Hodgman	Prop	16 July 1993 (aged 18)		(New Zealand) Canterbury
Ratulame Lewanavanua	Prop	9 July 1993 (aged 18)		(Fiji) Nadi
Sunia Tamani	Prop	18 May 1993 (aged 19)		(Fiji) Nasinu
Petero Tivitivi	Prop	30 January 1992 (aged 20)		(Fiji) QVSOB
Sakeasi Kaitoga	Lock	8 June 1993 (aged 18)		(Fiji) Namalata
Esikia Macu	Lock	28 March 1993 (aged 19)		(Fiji) Nausori
Temo Raibevu	Lock	17 May 1992 (aged 20)		(Fiji) Naitasiri
Ledua Ratumuri	Lock	21 September 1992 (aged 19)		(Fiji) Saunaka
Meli Baivatu	Flanker	2 April 1993 (aged 19)		(Fiji) QVSOB
Joketani Raikabula	Flanker	20 August 1992 (aged 19)		(New Zealand) Tawa
Aca Simolo	Flanker	4 May 1992 (aged 20)		(Fiji) Nadroga
Sitiveni Nawaqa	Number 8	1 October 1992 (aged 19)		(Fiji) Nadroga
Seru Cavuilati	Scrum-half	21 January 1992 (aged 20)		(Fiji) Nausori
Sakiusa Gavidi	Scrum-half	3 June 1992 (aged 20)		(Fiji) Nadroga
Michael Little	Fly-half	14 March 1993 (aged 19)		(New Zealand) Glenfield
Alivereti Mocelutu	Fly-half	14 June 1992 (aged 19)		(Fiji) Police
Sevanaia Galala	Centre	21 September 1993 (aged 18)		(France) Brive
Fred Hickes	Centre	17 July 1992 (aged 19)		(Fiji) Gaunavou
Josua Kerevi	Centre	18 June 1992 (aged 19)		(Fiji) USP
Samu Kerevi	Centre	27 September 1993 (aged 18)		(Australia) GPS Ashgrove
Timoci Seruwalu	Centre	9 January 1992 (aged 20)		(New Zealand) Norths
Matayavusa Lea	Wing	29 February 1992 (aged 20)		(Fiji) Suva
Elia Ratucove	Wing	13 July 1993 (aged 18)		(Fiji) Nausori
Jimilai Rokoduru	Wing	21 January 1993 (aged 19)		(Fiji) Uson Brothers
Tikilaci Vuibau	Fullback	14 August 1992 (aged 19)		(Fiji) Tailevu

=== New Zealand ===
New Zealand's 29-man squad for the 2012 IRB Junior World Championship.

Head Coach: Rob Penney

Note: Flags indicate national union for the club/province as defined by World Rugby.

Player	Position	Date of birth (age)	Caps	Club/province
Nathan Harris	Hooker	8 March 1992 (aged 20)		(New Zealand) Bay of Plenty
Rhys Marshall	Hooker	12 October 1992 (aged 19)		(New Zealand) Hawke's Bay
Fraser Armstrong	Prop	18 April 1992 (aged 20)		(New Zealand) Waikato
Reuben Northover	Prop	19 March 1992 (aged 20)		(New Zealand) Tasman
Tuki Raimona	Prop	14 February 1992 (aged 20)		(New Zealand) Southland
Eric Sione	Prop	29 October 1992 (aged 19)		(New Zealand) Wellington
Ofa Tu'ungafasi	Prop	19 April 1992 (aged 20)		(New Zealand) Auckland
Joe Latta	Lock	7 April 1992 (aged 20)		(New Zealand) Wellington
Christian Lloyd	Lock	24 January 1992 (aged 20)		(New Zealand) Wellington
Nick Ross	Lock	5 August 1992 (aged 19)		(New Zealand) Canterbury
Hugh Blake	Flanker	10 September 1992 (aged 19)		(New Zealand) Otago
Jake Heenan	Flanker	17 March 1992 (aged 20)		(New Zealand) Auckland
Taniela Manu	Flanker	28 April 1992 (aged 20)		(New Zealand) Canterbury
Glenn Preston	Flanker	13 April 1992 (aged 20)		(New Zealand) North Harbour
Jimmy Tupou	Flanker	8 August 1992 (aged 19)		(New Zealand) Counties Manukau
Jordan Taufua	Number 8	29 January 1992 (aged 20)		(New Zealand) Canterbury
Bryn Hall	Scrum-half	3 February 1992 (aged 20)		(New Zealand) North Harbour
Jono Kitto	Scrum-half	30 March 1992 (aged 20)		(New Zealand) Canterbury
Scott Eade	Fly-half	19 October 1992 (aged 19)		(New Zealand) Southland
Ihaia West	Fly-half	16 January 1992 (aged 20)		(New Zealand) Hawke's Bay
Opetera Peleseuma	Centre	11 February 1992 (aged 20)		(New Zealand) Wellington
Ambrose Curtis	Wing	17 April 1992 (aged 20)		(New Zealand) Wellington
Marnus Hanley	Wing	5 June 1992 (aged 19)		(New Zealand) Waikato
Milford Keresoma	Wing	1 February 1992 (aged 20)		(New Zealand) Auckland
Matt Proctor	Wing	26 October 1992 (aged 19)		(New Zealand) Wellington
Junior Va'a Tofa	Wing	23 June 1992 (aged 19)		(New Zealand) Auckland
Marty McKenzie	Fullback	14 August 1992 (aged 19)		(New Zealand) Southland
Pita Ahki	Utility back	24 September 1992 (aged 19)		(New Zealand) North Harbour
Jason Emery	Utility back	21 September 1993 (aged 18)		(New Zealand) Manawatu

=== Samoa ===
Samoa's 28-man squad for the 2012 IRB Junior World Championship.

Head Coach: John Schuster

Note: Flags indicate national union for the club/province as defined by World Rugby.

Player	Position	Date of birth (age)	Caps	Club/province
Ropeti Lafo	Hooker	13 March 1992 (aged 20)		(Samoa) Vaiusu
Damien Tovio	Hooker	14 December 1992 (aged 19)		(Samoa) Marist
Andrew Broomhall	Prop	22 October 1993 (aged 18)		(Samoa) Tufulele
Alex Iosefa	Prop	14 December 1992 (aged 19)		(Australia) Randwick
Petelo Masei	Prop	20 March 1992 (aged 20)		(Samoa) Manono Uta
Raymond Salu	Prop	22 June 1992 (aged 19)		(Samoa) Foaluga
Aniseto Sio	Prop	1 September 1992 (aged 19)		(Samoa) Vaimoso
Talaga Alofipo	Lock	21 November 1992 (aged 19)		(Samoa) Saleaula
Risati Faamatuainu	Lock	28 January 1992 (aged 20)		(Samoa) Lufilufi
Tofatuimoana Solia	Lock	21 January 1993 (aged 19)		(Samoa) Scopa
Senio Toleafoa	Lock	26 August 1993 (aged 18)		(Australia) West Harbour
Oneone Faafou	Flanker	2 June 1992 (aged 20)		(Samoa) Vaiala
Airi Hunt	Flanker	20 October 1993 (aged 18)		(Samoa) Aleisa
Elekana Laupola	Flanker	10 October 1993 (aged 18)		(Samoa) Lalomanu
Nukualofa Swerling	Flanker	8 August 1993 (aged 18)		(Australia) Brisbane
Tumama Tu'ulua	Flanker	22 March 1992 (aged 20)		(New Zealand) Crusader Knights
Vavao Afemai	Scrum-half	18 February 1992 (aged 20)		(Samoa) Vaiala
Faatafa Maiava	Scrum-half	31 December 1993 (aged 18)		(Samoa) Vaiala
Potoae Sasagi	Fly-half	18 April 1993 (aged 19)		(Samoa) Laumua o Tumua
Zachary Schuster	Fly-half	16 November 1993 (aged 18)		(New Zealand) Marist
Toetu David	Centre	19 June 1993 (aged 18)		(New Zealand) Ardmore Marist
Robert Lilomaiava	Centre	28 March 1992 (aged 20)		(Samoa) Vaiala
Lomitusi Ulu	Centre	27 February 1992 (aged 20)		(Samoa) Fagali'i
Fale Iosefa	Wing	19 August 1992 (aged 19)		(Samoa) Marist
Utu Poliko	Wing	4 January 1992 (aged 20)		(Samoa) Leulumoega
Peter Schuster	Wing	26 December 1992 (aged 19)		(Australia) Northern Suburbs
Jason Tagiilina	Wing	13 June 1993 (aged 18)		(Samoa) Saoluafata
Elia Togitele	Wing	4 September 1992 (aged 19)		(Samoa) Leulumoega
Fomai Ah Ki	Utility back	6 June 1993 (aged 18)		(New Zealand) Marist

=== Wales ===
Wales's 30-man squad for the 2012 IRB Junior World Championship.

Head Coach: Danny Wilson

Note: Flags indicate national union for the club/province as defined by World Rugby.

Player	Position	Date of birth (age)	Caps	Club/province
Darran Harris	Hooker	11 November 1992 (aged 19)		(Wales) Cardiff Blues
Kirby Myhill	Hooker	5 February 1992 (aged 20)		(Wales) Scarlets
Jamie Sollis	Hooker	15 September 1992 (aged 19)		(Wales) Newport Gwent Dragons
Rob Evans	Prop	14 April 1992 (aged 20)		(Wales) Scarlets
WillGriff John	Prop	4 December 1992 (aged 19)		(Wales) Cardiff Blues
Samson Lee	Prop	30 November 1992 (aged 19)		(Wales) Scarlets
Gareth Thomas	Prop	2 August 1993 (aged 18)		(Wales) Scarlets
Cory Hill	Lock	10 February 1992 (aged 20)		(Wales) Cardiff Blues
Rhodri Hughes	Lock	26 November 1993 (aged 18)		(Wales) Ospreys
Jack Jones	Lock	29 March 1993 (aged 19)		(Wales) Ospreys
Matthew Screech	Lock	24 October 1992 (aged 19)		(Wales) Cardiff Blues
Dan Baker	Flanker	5 July 1992 (aged 19)		(Wales) Ospreys
Luke Hamilton	Flanker	7 January 1992 (aged 20)		(Wales) Cardiff Blues
Ellis Jenkins	Flanker	29 April 1993 (aged 19)		(Wales) Cardiff Blues
Ieuan Jones	Flanker	16 June 1993 (aged 18)		(Wales) Newport Gwent Dragons
Daniel Thomas	Flanker	11 October 1993 (aged 18)		(Wales) Scarlets
Jonathan Evans	Scrum-half	25 July 1992 (aged 19)		(Wales) Newport Gwent Dragons
Tom Habberfield	Scrum-half	19 May 1992 (aged 20)		(Wales) Ospreys
Sam Davies	Fly-half	6 October 1993 (aged 18)		(Wales) Ospreys
Matthew Morgan	Fly-half	23 April 1992 (aged 20)		(Wales) Ospreys
Cory Allen	Centre	11 February 1993 (aged 19)		(Wales) Cardiff Blues
Jack Dixon	Centre	13 December 1994 (aged 17)		(Wales) Newport Gwent Dragons
Thomas Pascoe	Centre	5 April 1993 (aged 19)		(Wales) Cardiff Blues
Owen Williams	Centre	27 February 1992 (aged 20)		(Wales) Scarlets
Iolo Evans	Wing	12 September 1992 (aged 19)		(Wales) Scarlets
Luke Morgan	Wing	16 May 1992 (aged 20)		(Wales) Ospreys
Tom Prydie	Wing	23 February 1992 (aged 20)		(Wales) Newport Gwent Dragons
Eli Walker	Wing	28 March 1992 (aged 20)		(Wales) Ospreys
Ross Jones	Fullback	11 January 1992 (aged 20)		(Wales) Ospreys

== Pool B ==
=== England ===
England's 28-man squad for the 2012 IRB Junior World Championship.

Head Coach: Rob Hunter

Note: Flags indicate national union for the club/province as defined by World Rugby.

Player	Position	Date of birth (age)	Caps	Club/province
Koree Britton	Hooker	4 March 1992 (aged 20)		(England) Gloucester
Max Crumpton	Hooker	3 September 1992 (aged 19)		(England) Saracens
Nathan Morris	Hooker	3 March 1993 (aged 19)		(England) London Wasps
Luke Cowan-Dickie	Prop	20 June 1993 (aged 18)		(England) Exeter Chiefs
Ross Harrison	Prop	3 September 1992 (aged 19)		(England) Sale Sharks
Alec Hepburn	Prop	30 March 1993 (aged 19)		(England) London Wasps
Kyle Sinckler	Prop	30 March 1993 (aged 19)		(England) Harlequins
Dominic Barrow	Lock	19 March 1993 (aged 19)		(England) Leeds Carnegie
George Merrick	Lock	4 October 1992 (aged 19)		(England) Harlequins
Sam Twomey	Lock	9 May 1992 (aged 20)		(England) Harlequins
Jack Clifford	Flanker	12 February 1993 (aged 19)		(England) Harlequins
Ben Nutley	Flanker	7 April 1992 (aged 20)		(England) Northampton Saints
Dave Sisi	Flanker	5 February 1993 (aged 19)		(England) London Irish
Billy Vunipola	Flanker	3 November 1992 (aged 19)		(England) London Wasps
Chris Walker	Flanker	21 February 1992 (aged 20)		(England) Leeds Carnegie
Dan Robson	Scrum-half	14 March 1992 (aged 20)		(England) Gloucester
Ben Spencer	Scrum-half	31 July 1992 (aged 19)		(England) Saracens
Tommy Bell	Fly-half	11 November 1992 (aged 19)		(England) Sale Sharks
Tom Heathcote	Fly-half	11 February 1992 (aged 20)		(England) Bath
Henry Slade	Fly-half	19 March 1993 (aged 19)		(England) Exeter Chiefs
Sam Hill	Centre	14 July 1993 (aged 18)		(England) Exeter Chiefs
Ryan Mills	Centre	30 May 1992 (aged 20)		(England) Gloucester
Charlie Walker	Centre	23 December 1992 (aged 19)		(England) Harlequins
Will Addison	Wing	20 August 1992 (aged 19)		(England) Sale Sharks
Josh Bassett	Wing	17 March 1992 (aged 20)		(England) Bedford Blues
Jamie Elliott	Wing	31 August 1992 (aged 19)		(England) Northampton Saints
Marland Yarde	Wing	20 April 1992 (aged 20)		(England) London Irish
Ben Ransom	Fullback	16 February 1992 (aged 20)		(England) Saracens

=== Ireland ===
Ireland's 29-man squad for the 2012 IRB Junior World Championship.

Head Coach: Mike Ruddock

Note: Flags indicate national union for the club/province as defined by World Rugby.

Player	Position	Date of birth (age)	Caps	Club/province
James Rael	Hooker	25 March 1992 (aged 20)		(Ireland) Garryowen
Niall Scannell	Hooker	8 April 1992 (aged 20)		(Ireland) Dolphin
Jake Cawley	Prop	3 July 1992 (aged 19)		(Ireland) Old Belvedere
Tadhg Furlong	Prop	14 November 1992 (aged 19)		(Ireland) Clontarf
Des Merry	Prop	10 March 1992 (aged 20)		(Ireland) Clontarf
Peter Reilly	Prop	11 February 1992 (aged 20)		(Ireland) Lansdowne
Tadhg Beirne	Lock	8 January 1992 (aged 20)		(Ireland) Lansdowne
Iain Henderson	Lock	21 February 1992 (aged 20)		(Ireland) Queen's University Belfast
Alan O'Connor	Lock	10 September 1992 (aged 19)		(Ireland) University College Dublin
Shane Buckley	Flanker	14 April 1992 (aged 20)		(Ireland) Garryowen
Jordon Coghlan	Flanker	30 October 1992 (aged 19)		(Ireland) University College Dublin
Aaron Conneely	Flanker	23 January 1992 (aged 20)		(Ireland) Corinthians
Conor Gilsenan	Flanker	10 September 1992 (aged 19)		(Ireland) University College Dublin
Michael Oyuga	Flanker	14 January 1992 (aged 20)		(Ireland) Old Belvedere
Josh Van Der Flier	Flanker	25 April 1993 (aged 19)		(Ireland) University College Dublin
Jack Conan	Number 8	29 July 1992 (aged 19)		(Ireland) Old Belvedere
Kieran Marmion	Scrum-half	11 February 1992 (aged 20)		(Ireland) Corinthians
Luke McGrath	Scrum-half	3 February 1993 (aged 19)		(Ireland) University College Dublin
Jack Carty	Fly-half	31 August 1992 (aged 19)		(Ireland) Buccaneers
JJ Hanrahan	Fly-half	27 July 1992 (aged 19)		(Ireland) UL Bohemians
Cathal Marsh	Fly-half	10 January 1992 (aged 20)		(Ireland) Trinity College
Chris Farrell	Centre	16 March 1993 (aged 19)		(Ireland) Dungannon
Foster Horan	Centre	3 November 1992 (aged 19)		(Ireland) Lansdowne
Sam Coghlan-Murray	Wing	31 January 1992 (aged 20)		(Ireland) University College Dublin
Barry Daly	Wing	19 September 1992 (aged 19)		(Ireland) University College Dublin
Conor Finn	Wing	24 September 1992 (aged 19)		(Ireland) Buccaneers
Peter Nelson	Fullback	5 October 1992 (aged 19)		(Ireland) Dungannon
Mikey Sherlock	Fullback	14 June 1992 (aged 19)		(Ireland) Clontarf
Stuart Olding	Utility back	11 March 1993 (aged 19)		(Ireland) Belfast Harlequins

=== Italy ===
Italy's 30-man squad for the 2012 IRB Junior World Championship.

Head Coach: (New Zealand) Craig Green

Note: Flags indicate national union for the club/province as defined by World Rugby.

Player	Position	Date of birth (age)	Caps	Club/province
Luca Conti	Hooker	2 January 1993 (aged 19)		(Italy) Capitolina
Giovanni Maistri	Hooker	4 June 1992 (aged 20)		(Italy) Calvisano
Alfio Luca Mammana	Hooker	3 May 1992 (aged 20)		(Italy) L'Aquila
Giovanni Scalvi	Hooker	6 February 1992 (aged 20)		(Italy) Reggio
Leonardo Bortoletti	Prop	28 January 1992 (aged 20)		(Italy) Rubano
Pietro Ceccarelli	Prop	16 February 1992 (aged 20)		(France) La Rochelle
Sami Panico	Prop	4 June 1993 (aged 19)		(Italy) Capitolina
Luca Scarsini	Prop	14 July 1993 (aged 18)		(Italy) Udine
Marco Bellucci	Lock	9 March 1993 (aged 19)		(Italy) Cecina
Matteo Ferro	Lock	9 July 1992 (aged 19)		(Italy) Rovigo
Alessio Zdrilich	Lock	9 March 1993 (aged 19)		(Italy) Ospitaletto
Federico Conforti	Flanker	19 March 1992 (aged 20)		(Italy) Petrarca Padova
Ruben Riccioli	Flanker	9 January 1992 (aged 20)		(Italy) Lazio Roma
Guglielmo Zanini	Flanker	9 March 1992 (aged 20)		(Italy) San Dona
Vittorio Marazzi	Number 8	16 April 1993 (aged 19)		(Italy) Sondrio
Jacopo Salvetti	Number 8	21 July 1993 (aged 18)		(Italy) Sondrio
Guido Calabrese	Scrum-half	18 June 1992 (aged 19)		(Italy) San Gregorio
Edoardo Padovani	Scrum-half	15 May 1993 (aged 19)		(Italy) Mogliano
Marcello Violi	Scrum-half	11 October 1993 (aged 18)		(Italy) Noceto
John Apperley	Fly-half	25 June 1992 (aged 19)		(Italy) Reggio
Giovanni Benvenuti	Centre	12 December 1993 (aged 18)		(Italy) Mogliano
Andrea Bettin	Centre	29 August 1993 (aged 18)		(Italy) Rubano
Giulio Bisegni	Centre	4 April 1992 (aged 20)		(Italy) Lazio Roma
Tommaso Boni	Centre	15 January 1993 (aged 19)		(Italy) Mogliano
Michele Campagnaro	Centre	13 March 1993 (aged 19)		(Italy) Mirano
Filippo Guarducci	Wing	25 August 1993 (aged 18)		(Italy) Mogliano
Alex Morsellino	Wing	7 March 1992 (aged 20)		(Italy) Petrarca Padova
Leonardo Sarto	Wing	15 January 1992 (aged 20)		(Italy) Petrarca Padova
Alessandro Tartaglia	Wing	13 October 1992 (aged 19)		(Italy) Lazio Roma
David Odiete	Fullback	24 February 1993 (aged 19)		(Italy) Reggio

=== South Africa ===
South Africa's 31-man squad for the 2012 IRB Junior World Championship.

Head Coach: Dawie Theron

Note: Flags indicate national union for the club/province as defined by World Rugby.

Player	Position	Date of birth (age)	Caps	Club/province
Franco Marais	Hooker	23 September 1992 (aged 19)		(South Africa) Sharks
Mark Pretorius	Hooker	9 June 1992 (aged 19)		(South Africa) Golden Lions
Jason Thomas	Hooker	3 August 1992 (aged 19)		(South Africa) Blue Bulls
Allan Dell	Prop	16 March 1992 (aged 20)		(South Africa) Sharks
Oli Kebble	Prop	18 June 1992 (aged 19)		(South Africa) Western Province
Steven Kitshoff	Prop	10 February 1992 (aged 20)		(South Africa) Western Province
Maks van Dyk	Prop	21 January 1992 (aged 20)		(South Africa) Sharks
Ruan Botha	Lock	10 January 1992 (aged 20)		(South Africa) Golden Lions
Pieter-Steph du Toit	Lock	20 August 1992 (aged 19)		(South Africa) Sharks
Marvin Orie	Lock	15 February 1993 (aged 19)		(South Africa) Blue Bulls
Paul Willemse	Lock	13 November 1992 (aged 19)		(South Africa) Golden Lions
Shaun Adendorff	Flanker	28 May 1992 (aged 20)		(South Africa) Blue Bulls
Fabian Booysen	Flanker	21 March 1992 (aged 20)		(South Africa) Golden Lions
Wiaan Liebenberg	Flanker	31 August 1992 (aged 19)		(South Africa) Blue Bulls
Khaya Majola	Flanker	13 March 1992 (aged 20)		(South Africa) Sharks
Braam Steyn	Flanker	2 May 1992 (aged 20)		(South Africa) Sharks
Abrie Griesel	Scrum-half	15 January 1992 (aged 20)		(South Africa) Blue Bulls
Vian van der Watt	Scrum-half	18 November 1992 (aged 19)		(South Africa) Golden Lions
Tony Jantjies	Fly-half	19 April 1992 (aged 20)		(South Africa) Blue Bulls
Dillyn Leyds	Fly-half	12 September 1992 (aged 19)		(South Africa) Western Province
Handré Pollard	Fly-half	11 March 1994 (aged 18)		(South Africa) Western Province
Patrick Howard	Centre	27 March 1992 (aged 20)		(South Africa) Western Province
Paul Jordaan	Centre	1 April 1992 (aged 20)		(South Africa) Sharks
Tshotsho Mbovane	Centre	1 August 1992 (aged 19)		(South Africa) Western Province
Jan Serfontein	Centre	15 April 1993 (aged 19)		(South Africa) Blue Bulls
William Small-Smith	Centre	31 March 1992 (aged 20)		(South Africa) Blue Bulls
Kobus van Wyk	Centre	22 January 1992 (aged 20)		(South Africa) Western Province
Dean Hammond	Wing	9 July 1992 (aged 19)		(South Africa) Western Province
Travis Ismaiel	Wing	12 June 1992 (aged 19)		(South Africa) Blue Bulls
Raymond Rhule	Wing	6 November 1992 (aged 19)		(South Africa) Free State Cheetahs
Marais Schmidt	Fullback	23 April 1992 (aged 20)		(South Africa) Golden Lions

== Pool C ==
=== Argentina ===
Argentina's 28-man squad for the 2012 IRB Junior World Championship.

Head Coach: Facundo Soler, Bernardo Urdaneta Velez

Note: Flags indicate national union for the club/province as defined by World Rugby.

Player	Position	Date of birth (age)	Caps	Club/province
Santiago Iglesias	Hooker	22 May 1993 (aged 19)		(Argentina) Universitario
German Lefort	Hooker	15 December 1992 (aged 19)		(Argentina) Tucumán RC
Matias Diaz	Prop	16 February 1993 (aged 19)		(Argentina) Teqüe
Santiago García Botta	Prop	19 June 1992 (aged 19)		(Argentina) Belgrano
Ramon Gonzalez	Prop	15 March 1992 (aged 20)		(Argentina) Lince RC
Matias Sambran	Prop	19 January 1992 (aged 20)		(Argentina) Cordoba Athletic
Mariano Sanchez	Prop	3 January 1992 (aged 20)		(Argentina) Tucumán RC
Juan Cruz Guillemaín	Lock	21 August 1992 (aged 19)		(Argentina) Jockey Club de San Juan
Rodrigo Parada Heit	Lock	26 May 1992 (aged 20)		(Argentina) Cordoba Athletic
Leandro Ramella	Lock	23 December 1992 (aged 19)		(Argentina) Atlético del Rosario
Ladislao Uriburu	Lock	25 January 1992 (aged 20)		(Argentina) Jockey Club de Salta
Joaquín Camacho	Flanker	9 January 1992 (aged 20)		(Argentina) Buenos Aires Cricket & Rugby Club
Lautaro Casado	Flanker	2 June 1992 (aged 20)		(Argentina) Uru Curé
Facundo Isa	Flanker	21 September 1993 (aged 18)		(Argentina) Santiago Lawn Tennis Club
Pablo Matera	Flanker	18 July 1993 (aged 18)		(Argentina) Asociación Alumni
Gaspar Oberti	Flanker	15 June 1992 (aged 19)		(Argentina) Uru Curé
Rodolfo Ambrosio	Scrum-half	6 March 1992 (aged 20)		(Argentina) Tala
Felipe Ezcurra	Scrum-half	15 April 1993 (aged 19)		(Argentina) Hindú
Joaquin Paz	Fly-half	11 January 1993 (aged 19)		(Argentina) Cordoba Athletic
Sebastián Poet	Fly-half	20 October 1992 (aged 19)		(Argentina) Atlético del Rosario
Juan Ignacio Brex	Centre	26 May 1992 (aged 20)		(Argentina) San Cirano
Juan Cappiello	Centre	4 March 1992 (aged 20)		(Argentina) Pucará
Matias Frias Silva	Centre	17 May 1992 (aged 20)		(Argentina) Tucumán RC
Ramiro Finco	Wing	10 January 1992 (aged 20)		(Argentina) Curupaytí
Felipe Nougues	Wing	3 June 1992 (aged 20)		(Argentina) La Tablada
Santiago Cordero	Fullback	6 December 1993 (aged 18)		(Argentina) Regatas de Bella Vista
Gonzalo Ruiz	Fullback	3 June 1992 (aged 20)		(Argentina) Tala
German Klubus	Utility back	3 April 1992 (aged 20)		(Argentina) Pucará

=== Australia ===
Australia's 28-man squad for the 2012 IRB Junior World Championship.

Head Coach: David Nucifora

Note: Flags indicate national union for the club/province as defined by World Rugby.

Player	Position	Date of birth (age)	Caps	Club/province
Maile Ngauamo	Hooker	15 August 1993 (aged 18)		(Australia) Sunnybank
Hugh Roach	Hooker	11 September 1992 (aged 19)		(Australia) Eastwood
Allan Alaalatoa	Prop	28 January 1994 (aged 18)		(Australia) West Harbour
Oli Hoskins	Prop	6 March 1993 (aged 19)		(Australia) Manly
Tolu Latu	Prop	23 February 1993 (aged 19)		(Australia) Sydney University
Leslie Leulua’iali’i-Makin	Prop	2 January 1992 (aged 20)		(Australia) Queanbeyan
Pettowa Paraka	Prop	16 November 1993 (aged 18)		(Australia) Easts
Steve Cummins	Lock	29 March 1992 (aged 20)		(Australia) Eastwood
Jed Holloway	Lock	2 November 1992 (aged 19)		(Australia) Southern Districts
Sam Jeffries	Lock	20 May 1992 (aged 20)		(Australia) Sydney University
Sam Reiser	Flanker	6 November 1993 (aged 18)		(Australia) Queensland University
Curtis Browning	Flanker	30 October 1993 (aged 18)		(Australia) Queensland University
Tom Cusack	Flanker	1 March 1993 (aged 19)		(Australia) Canberra Royals
Liam Gill	Flanker	8 June 1992 (aged 19)		(Australia) Sunnybank
Sean McMahon	Flanker	18 June 1994 (aged 17)		(Australia) GPS Ashgrove
Benn Melrose	Flanker	24 October 1992 (aged 19)		(Australia) Sydney University
Nicholas Frisby	Scrum-half	29 October 1992 (aged 19)		(Australia) GPS Ashgrove
Matt Lucas	Scrum-half	29 January 1992 (aged 20)		(Australia) Sunnybank
Jock Merriman	Scrum-half	21 August 1993 (aged 18)		(Australia) Sydney University
Kyle Godwin	Fly-half	30 July 1992 (aged 19)		(Australia) Associates
UJ Seuteni	Fly-half	9 December 1993 (aged 18)		(Australia) Easts
Allan Fa'alava'au	Centre	15 November 1993 (aged 18)		(Australia) Endeavour Hills
Con Foley	Centre	19 September 1992 (aged 19)		(Australia) Queensland University
Apo Latunipulu	Centre	15 April 1992 (aged 20)		(Australia) Queensland University
Chris Feauai-Sautia	Centre	17 November 1993 (aged 18)		(Australia) Souths
Lindsay Crook	Wing	2 November 1992 (aged 19)		(Australia) Queensland University
James Dargaville	Wing	25 April 1992 (aged 20)		(Australia) Sydney University
Lewis Holland	Wing	14 January 1993 (aged 19)		(Australia) Queanbeyan
Alexander Northam	Wing	4 March 1993 (aged 19)		(Australia) Manly

=== France ===
France's 31-man squad for the 2012 IRB Junior World Championship.

Head Coach: Didier Retière

Note: Flags indicate national union for the club/province as defined by World Rugby.

Player	Position	Date of birth (age)	Caps	Club/province
Raphael Carbou	Hooker	6 September 1992 (aged 19)		(France) Perpignan
Jean Charles Fidinde	Hooker	10 May 1992 (aged 20)		(France) Montpellier
Pascal Cotet	Prop	12 October 1993 (aged 18)		(France) Perpignan
Jean-Baptiste Custosa	Prop	20 May 1993 (aged 19)		(France) Perpignan
Florian Fresia	Prop	17 January 1992 (aged 20)		(France) Toulon
Jefferson Poirot	Prop	1 November 1992 (aged 19)		(France) Brive
Sebastien Taofifenua	Prop	21 March 1992 (aged 20)		(France) Perpignan
Khatchik Vartanov	Prop	6 February 1993 (aged 19)		(France) Racing Métro
Johan Aliouat	Lock	22 January 1993 (aged 19)		(France) Montpellier
Bastien Chalureau	Lock	13 February 1992 (aged 20)		(France) Toulouse
Andrew Chauveau	Lock	18 January 1992 (aged 20)		(France) Bordeaux-Bègles
Pierre Gayraud	Lock	27 March 1992 (aged 20)		(France) Perpignan
Paul Jedrasiak	Lock	6 February 1993 (aged 19)		(France) Clermont
Karl Chateau	Flanker	15 June 1992 (aged 19)		(France) Toulouse
Alexandre Derrien	Flanker	6 June 1992 (aged 19)		(France) Bourgoin
Kelian Galletier	Flanker	28 March 1992 (aged 20)		(France) Montpellier
Julien Kazubek	Flanker	16 June 1992 (aged 19)		(France) Clermont
Jonathan Laugel	Flanker	30 January 1993 (aged 19)		(France) Racing Métro
Eric Escande	Scrum-half	18 November 1992 (aged 19)		(France) Montpellier
Etienne Quiniou	Scrum-half	21 January 1992 (aged 20)		(France) Dax
Thomas Laranjeira	Fly-half	5 May 1992 (aged 20)		(France) Brive
Clement Otazo	Fly-half	3 May 1992 (aged 20)		(France) Bayonne
Enzo Selponi	Fly-half	16 June 1993 (aged 18)		(France) Montpellier
Jonathan Danty	Centre	7 October 1992 (aged 19)		(France) Stade Français
Gaël Fickou	Centre	26 March 1994 (aged 18)		(France) Toulon
Bastien Fuster	Centre	21 January 1992 (aged 20)		(France) Bayonne
Jimmy Yobo	Centre	20 February 1992 (aged 20)		(France) Stade Aurillacois
Yohann Artru	Wing	31 May 1992 (aged 20)		(France) Montpellier
Vincent Martin	Wing	4 September 1992 (aged 19)		(France) Toulon
Darly Domvo	Fullback	3 April 1992 (aged 20)		(France) Bordeaux-Bègles
Theo Platon	Fullback	8 September 1992 (aged 19)		(France) Biarritz

=== Scotland ===
Scotland's 28-man squad for the 2012 IRB Junior World Championship.

Head Coach: Peter Wright

Note: Flags indicate national union for the club/province as defined by World Rugby.

Player	Position	Date of birth (age)	Caps	Club/province
Fergus Scott	Hooker	1 August 1992 (aged 19)		(England) Loughborough University
George Turner	Hooker	8 October 1992 (aged 19)		(Scotland) Stirling County
Alex Allan	Prop	28 February 1992 (aged 20)		(Scotland) Heriot's
Jamie Bhatti	Prop	8 September 1993 (aged 18)		(Scotland) Boroughmuir
Struan Cessford	Prop	20 January 1992 (aged 20)		(Scotland) Dundee
Robin Hislop	Prop	26 February 1992 (aged 20)		(Scotland) Currie
Gavin Robertson	Prop	18 January 1992 (aged 20)		(Scotland) Stewart's Melville
Andrew Redmayne	Lock	26 June 1992 (aged 19)		(Scotland) Dundee
Adam Sinclair	Lock	21 January 1993 (aged 19)		(Scotland) Stirling County
Stuart Smith	Lock	16 January 1992 (aged 20)		(Scotland) Aberdeen Grammar
Will Bordill	Flanker	24 May 1993 (aged 19)		(England) Sale Sharks
Mitch Eadie	Flanker	6 July 1992 (aged 19)		(England) Bristol
Gary Graham	Flanker	29 August 1992 (aged 19)		(Scotland) Gala
Alex Henderson	Flanker	22 September 1993 (aged 18)		(Scotland) Boroughmuir
Andrew Nagle	Number 8	17 March 1992 (aged 20)		(Scotland) Jed-Forest
Callum Reid	Number 8	9 September 1992 (aged 19)		(Scotland) Edinburgh Academicals
Jamie Swanson	Number 8	1 July 1992 (aged 19)		(Scotland) Boroughmuir
Murray McConnell	Scrum-half	16 November 1992 (aged 19)		(Scotland) Ayr
Matt Torrance	Scrum-half	7 September 1992 (aged 19)		(South Africa) Glenwood High School
Harry Leonard	Fly-half	28 April 1992 (aged 20)		(Scotland) Boroughmuir
Tommy Allan	Centre	26 April 1993 (aged 19)		(South Africa) Western Province
Mark Bennett	Centre	3 February 1993 (aged 19)		(France) Clermont
Robbie Ferguson	Centre	30 August 1993 (aged 18)		(Scotland) Ayr
Finn Russell	Centre	23 September 1992 (aged 19)		(Scotland) Falkirk
Mike Crawley	Wing	19 August 1992 (aged 19)		(Scotland) Boroughmuir
Jamie Farndale	Wing	21 February 1994 (aged 18)		(Scotland) Edinburgh Academicals
Sam Hidalgo-Clyne	Wing	4 August 1993 (aged 18)		(Scotland) Heriot's
Tom Steven	Wing	7 January 1992 (aged 20)		(Scotland) Glasgow Hawks
Keith Buchan	Fullback	30 March 1993 (aged 19)		(Scotland) Boroughmuir
