= 2024 Nacional de Clubes =

- Event: Nacional de Clubes
Tucumán Lawn Tennis	Alumni
URT	URBA
22	17
- Date: 16 November 2024
- Venue: Estadio Héctor Cabrera, Tucumán, Argentina
- Referee: Juan M. López (Córdoba)
- Attendance: 10,000

The 2024 Torneo Nacional de Clubes (named "Nacional de Clubes Copa Visa Macro" for sponsorship reasons) the 27th. edition of Nacional de Clubes, a rugby union competition in Argentina organised by the Argentine Rugby Union (UAR). The final was held in Estadio Héctor Cabrera (mostly known as La Caldera del Parque), home venue of Tucumán LT, located in the city of San Miguel de Tucumán, on 16 November 2024.

Just as it has been every year since 2022, the competition is contested by two teams (champions of URBA Top 12 and Torneo del Interior), which play a single superfinal match.

The match was contested by Tucumán Lawn Tennis (champion of 2024 Torneo del Interior, which played their first final) and Alumni (champions of 2024 URBA Top 12, which played their 4th. final).

Tucumán LT, with fly-half Nicolás Sánchez (who had returned to the club in June that year) won the match 22–17, achieving their first national championship. With Sánchez leading the team, Tucumán LT set a 14-consecutive win record in both competitions.

== Qualified teams ==
Team	Qualification	Union	Previous final app.
Tucumán Lawn Tennis	2025 Torneo del Interior champion	URT	(none)
Alumni	2024 URBA Top 12 champion	URBA	1996, 2001, **2002**

Note

- **Bold** indicates winning years

== Venue ==
The final was held in Estadio Héctor Cabrera (mostly known as La Caldera del Parque), home venue of Tucumán LT, located in the city of San Miguel de Tucumán. The stadium, with capacity for 10,000 spectators, was named after number 8 Héctor Gallo Cabrera (died at 54 in 2007), regarded not only as one of the most notable players in the history of the club but of Tucumán's rugby.

Gallo –who had arrived to the club in 1972– had been a football player so he was good at kicking and used to take the penalty kicks. He also captained the Unión de Rugby de Tucumán (URT) team from 1976 to 1985, and was coach of both, Tucumán LT and the URT team. Gallo died from cancer in 2007.

== Background ==
Tucumán Lawn Tennis qualified as champions of Torneo del Interior, where they defeated Jockey Club Córdoba 3024 in the final, being their first regional title. Tucumán LT had entered to the Interior tournament as winners of the Torneo del Noroeste (6th. title).

On the other hand, Alumni qualified as URBA champions after defeating their clásico, Belgrano Athletic, in the 2024 URBA Top 12 final

It was the first final contested by Tucumán LT. Before of that, their best performance was in 2015 when they reached the quarterfinals (lost to rivals Tucumán RC 22–20). In the case of Alumni, their previous participations in national championship finals had been in 1996, 2001 (both lost to Hindú) and in 2002, when they won the championship defeating Jockey Club Rosario.

== Match ==
Alumni started stronger, using the maul as their main weapon, and took the lead with a try by Franco Battezzati. However, the home side didn't let the setback affect them, and an immediate try by Joaquín López Islas quickly turned the score around. With a penalty apiece, both teams went into halftime with the feeling that they hadn't shown their full potential, and with a score (10–8 in favor of the home side) that left the outcome of the second half wide open.

In the second half the game became more dramatic, and Nicolás Sánchez went head-to-head with his friend Santiago González Iglesias. The Alumni fullback put his team ahead with three penalties, but just when it seemed the cup was headed back to Buenos Aires, the Tucumán fly-half had the final say. With two penalties, the second in stoppage time, he sealed the victory for Tucumán that therefore crowned as national champions.

=== Details ===
16 Nov 2024

**Tucumán Lawn Tennis**	**22–17**	**Alumni**
Try: López Islas 16'; Con: Sánchez 16', 56'; Pen: Sánchez 9', 72', 40'; Drop: Sánchez 47'	Report 1 Report 2	Try: Battezzati 13'; Pen: Díaz Luzzi 25'; G. Iglesias 60'

Estadio Héctor Cabrera, Tucumán
Attendance: 10,000
Referee: Juan M. López (Córdoba)

**Tucumán LT**
**Alumni**

FB	15	Santiago Rez Masud (c)		(substituted off) 54'
RW	14	Facundo Novillo
OC	13	Stefano Ferro
IC	12	José Gianotti
LW	11	Lucas Solimo
FH	10	Nicolás Sánchez
SH	9	Joaquín López Islas		(substituted off) 65'
N8	8	Miguel Mukdise
OF	7	Ignacio Manino		(substituted off) 54'
BF	6	Pedro Bottini
RL	5	Tomás Argüello
LL	4	Juan Cruz Calliera		(substituted off) 70'
TP	3	Rodrigo Navarro	(yellow card) 38'	(substituted off) 48'
HK	2	Mariano Barrionuevo		(substituted off) 45'
LP	1	Santiago Bellagamba		(substituted off) 45'
Substitutions:
	16	Mariano Bustamante		(substituted on) 45'
	17	Luis Salazar		(substituted on) 45'
	18	Agustín Iglesias		(substituted on) 48'
	20	Stefano Jogna Prat		(substituted on) 54'
	23	Matías Ferro		(substituted on) 54'
	21	Santiago Sáleme		(substituted on) 65'
	19	Luciano Casañas		(substituted on) 70'
Coach:
(Argentina) Álvaro Tejera

FB	15	Santiago González Iglesias	(yellow card) 5'
RW	14	Ramón Fuentes
OC	13	Tomás Cubilla
IC	12	Franco Battezzati
LW	11	Alejo Gonzáles Chaves	(yellow card) 18'	(substituted off) 61'
FH	10	Joaquín Díaz Luzzi
SH	9	Tomás Passerotti
N8	8	Santiago Montagner
OF	7	Patricio Anderson
BF	6	Ignacio Cubilla		(substituted off) 50'
RL	5	Santiago Alduncin		(substituted off) 56'
LL	4	Manuel Mora
TP	3	Bautista Vidal		(substituted off) 48'
HK	2	Tomás Bivort (c)
LP	1	Federico Lucca		(substituted off) 54'
Substitutions:
	18	Tomás Rapetti		(substituted on) 48'
	20	Nicolás Promanzio		(substituted on) 50'
	16	Máximo Castrillo		(substituted on) 54'
	19	Bernardo Quaranta		(substituted on) 56'
	22	Cruz González Bibolini		(substituted on) 61'
Coaches:
(Argentina) Rodrigo Jiménez Salice (Argentina) Hernán Ballatore
