= 2025 Nacional de Clubes =

- Event: Nacional de Clubes
| Newman | Marista |
| URBA | Cuyo |
| 38 | 15 |
- Date: 15 November 2025
- Venue: Estadio Timothy O'Brien, Benavídez, Argentina
- Referee: Tomás Ninci (Córdoba)

The 2025 Torneo Nacional de Clubes (named "Nacional de Clubes Copa Visa Macro" for sponsorship reasons) the 28th. edition of Nacional de Clubes, a rugby union competition in Argentina organised by the Argentine Rugby Union (UAR). The final was held in Estadio Timothy O'Brien, home venue of Club Newman in Benavídez, Tigre Partido, on 15 November 2015.

Just as it has been every year since 2022, the competition is contested by two teams (champions of URBA Top 12 and Torneo del Interior), which play a single superfinal match.

The match was contested by Newman (champion of 2025 URBA Top 12, which played their 3rd. final), and Marista (champion of 2025 Torneo del Interior. which contested their 1st. final).

Newman won the match 35–15, achieving their first national championship. Therefore, the Cardenales won their first URBA and Nacional titles within the calendar year, and commemorating the 50th. anniversary of the club.

== Qualified teams ==
| Team | Qualification | Union | Previous final app. |
|---|---|---|---|
| Newman | 2025 URBA Top 12 champion | URBA | 2015, 2018 |
| Marista | 2025 Torneo del Interior champion | Cuyo | (none) |

Note

- **Bold** indicates winning years

== Background ==
Newman qualified as URBA champion after defeating San Isidro Club 15–3 in the Top 12 final, earning their first title in the top division.

Newman's best campaigns in Nacional de Clubes had been in 2015 and 2018, when the team played the finals but lost both to Hindú.

On the other hand, Marista qualified as champion of Torneo del Interior, where the squad had defeated Jockey Club Córdoba 27–7 in the final, winning their first Interior title (and the first for a team from Mendoza Province).

Marista's best performance in Nacional de Clubes had been in 2019 where they reached the semifinals and lost to Hindú.

== Match ==
The first 40 minutes were intense and hard-fought, with no clear dominator throughout the first half. Although Newman spent more time in the opposition's half, they lacked the necessary finishing touch. As the minutes ticked by, the heat became more pronounced, and the initial intensity began to dissipate. Despite this, it was Marista that struck first. Just two minutes had passed when centers Julián Hernández and Alejo Videla left the home defense helpless, and Hernández finished off the first great team move of the afternoon.

This unexpected blow caused a reaction from the hosts, who slowly began to impose their will. For 20 minutes, the team from Benavídez controlled the game, with Santiago Marolda as key figure during that period. Their power and speed were the home team's preferred weapon, which finally paid off in the 22nd minute when the winger racked up a number of tackles, only to be stopped a few meters from his try line. There, scrum-half Lucas Marguery spotted a gaping hole in the defense and surged across the try line to level the score. After the tie, the visitors relied on their forwards to take control, which lowered the intensity of the game but caused significant problems for the Newman pack, who committed a high number of penalties. This lull in the game persisted until the end of the first half, with neither side able to gain a decisive advantage, although Marista had a great opportunity near the end.

After the break, the pattern remained the same, with the Mendoza team dominating the opening minutes of the second half. Just as in the first half, the Mendoza team struck first again with a try by their lock, Valentín Gozálvez, in the seventh minute. The visitors' advantage didn't last long, however, as the home team quickly rallied to turn the game around and completely dominate this hard-fought final. During this period, the home pack effectively pressured their opponents, which proved crucial in allowing Lucas Marguery to reach the try line once more. The home side capitalized on this momentum, completely dominating the field and consolidating their lead with a penalty try that gave them a 24–15 advantage with 20 minutes remaining.

The pattern of play remained unchanged in the decisive minutes, as Newman further solidified their dominance, capitalizing on the visitors' fatigue after playing with two men down following yellow cards for Fernández and Pronce. These suspensions proved crucial in Cardinal's complete control of the final. Exhaustion and cramps were the main factors in the closing stages of this match, which ultimately crowned the Benavídez team URBA champions for the first time in their history.

=== Details ===
15 Nov 2025

| **Newman** | **38–15** | **Marista** |
| Try: Marguery 21', 54'; Gozálvez 47' penalty try 56' de Vivar 63'; Salece 79'; Con: G. Taboada 21', 54', 63', 79'; Pen: G. Taboada 7' | Report 1 Report 2 | Try: Hernández 2'; Prince 38'; Con: Filizzola 2'; Pen: Filizzola 27' |

Estadio Timothy O'Brien, Benavídez
Referee: Tomás Ninci (Córdoba)

**Newman**
**Marista**

| FB | 15 | Juan Bautista Daireaux | | (substituted off) 51' |
| RW | 14 | Santiago Marolda |
| OC | 13 | Benjamín Lanfranco |
| IC | 12 | Tomás Keena | | (substituted off) 54' |
| LW | 11 | Jerónimo Ulloa |
| FH | 10 | Gonzalo Gutiérrez Taboada | | (substituted off) 80' |
| SH | 9 | Lucas Marguery | | (substituted off) 77' |
| N8 | 8 | Rodrigo Díaz de Vivar |
| OF | 7 | Joaquín de la Vega |
| BF | 6 | Faustino Santarelli | | (substituted off) 51' |
| RL | 5 | Alejandro Urtubey | | (substituted off) 58' |
| LL | 4 | Pablo Cardinal |
| TP | 3 | Bautista Bosch | | (substituted off) 58' |
| HK | 2 | Marcelo Brandi | | (substituted off) 78' |
| LP | 1 | Miguel Prince | (yellow card) 34' | (substituted off) 12' (substituted off) 78' |
Substitutions:
| FL | | James Wright | | (substituted on) 12' (substituted on) 78' |
| W | | Jerónimo Ulloa | | (substituted on) 51' |
| C | | Cruz Ulloa | | (substituted on) 51' |
| P | | Fermín Perkins | | (substituted on) 58' |
| L | | Francisco Lascombes | | (substituted on) 58' |
| | | Lucas Nava | | (substituted on) 77' |
| | | Beltrán Salese | | (substituted on) 78' |
| | | Florencio Llerena | | (substituted on) 80' |
Coach:
(Argentina) Santiago Piccaluga

| FB | 23 | Matías Colomer |
| RW | 14 | Genaro Podestá | (substituted on) 69' |
| OC | 13 | Alejo Videla |
| IC | 12 | Julián Hernández |
| LW | 11 | Lucas Bartolini |
| FH | 10 | Bautista Filizzola |
| SH | 9 | Lucca Filizzola | (substituted on) 55' |
| N8 | 8 | Agustín Sarell |
| OF | 7 | Agustín Gómez |
| BF | 6 | Tomás Gómez |
| RL | 5 | Valentín Gozálvez | (substituted on) 58' |
| LL | 4 | Fausto Fernández |
| TP | 3 | Maximiliano Montilla | (substituted on) 43' |
| HK | 22 | Jesús Porro | (substituted on) 45' |
| LP | 1 | Alejandro Pronce |
Substitutions:
| | | Gabriel Ponce | (substituted on) 43' |
| | | Marcos Porro | (substituted on) 45' |
| | | Tobías Filizzola | (substituted on) 55' |
| | | Gerónimo Tejada | (substituted on) 58' |
| | | Lisandro Sosa Jiranek | (substituted on) 69' |
Coach:
(Argentina) Daniel Rocuzzo
