= 2025 URBA Top 12 final =

Rugby union match in Argentina

- Event: 2025 URBA Top 12 final
Newman	SIC
15	3
- Date: 1 Nov 2025
- Venue: Estadio del CASI, San Isidro, Argentina
- Referee: Tómas Bertazza
- Attendance: 4,500

The 2025 URBA Top 12 final was the final of the 2025 URBA Top 12, the 126th. edition of Torneo de la URBA, the regional rugby union competition organised by Unión de Rugby de Buenos Aires (URBA). It is the oldest rugby competition in South America and one of the oldest club competitions in the world.

The match was contested by Newman and San Isidro Club (mostly known for its acronym "SIC"), and was held in Estadio del CASI. Since the URBA implemented the playoffs system in 1998, it was the 2nd. final contested by Newman (having lost to Hindú in 2008) while SIC played their 13th final, having won eight of them.

Newman won the match 15–3 to win their first league title.

== Background ==
Since its establishment in 1935 after a schism in Club Atlético San Isidro, San Isidro Club has become one of the landmark clubs of Argentine rugby, having won 27 URBA titles (second to C.A. San Isidro which leads with 33 titles) and 4 Nacional de Clubes championships.

On the other hand, Newman, established in 1975 by alumni of Cardinal Newman College, had only played one final in 2008 but they lost to Hindú, which was the predominant force in Argentine rugby in those times.

== Qualified teams ==
Team	Previous final app.
Newman	2008
SIC	1998, **1999**, **2002**, **2003**, **2004**, 2005, **2010**, **2011**, **2019**, 2021, 2022, **2023**

Note

- **Bold** indicates winning years

== Venue ==
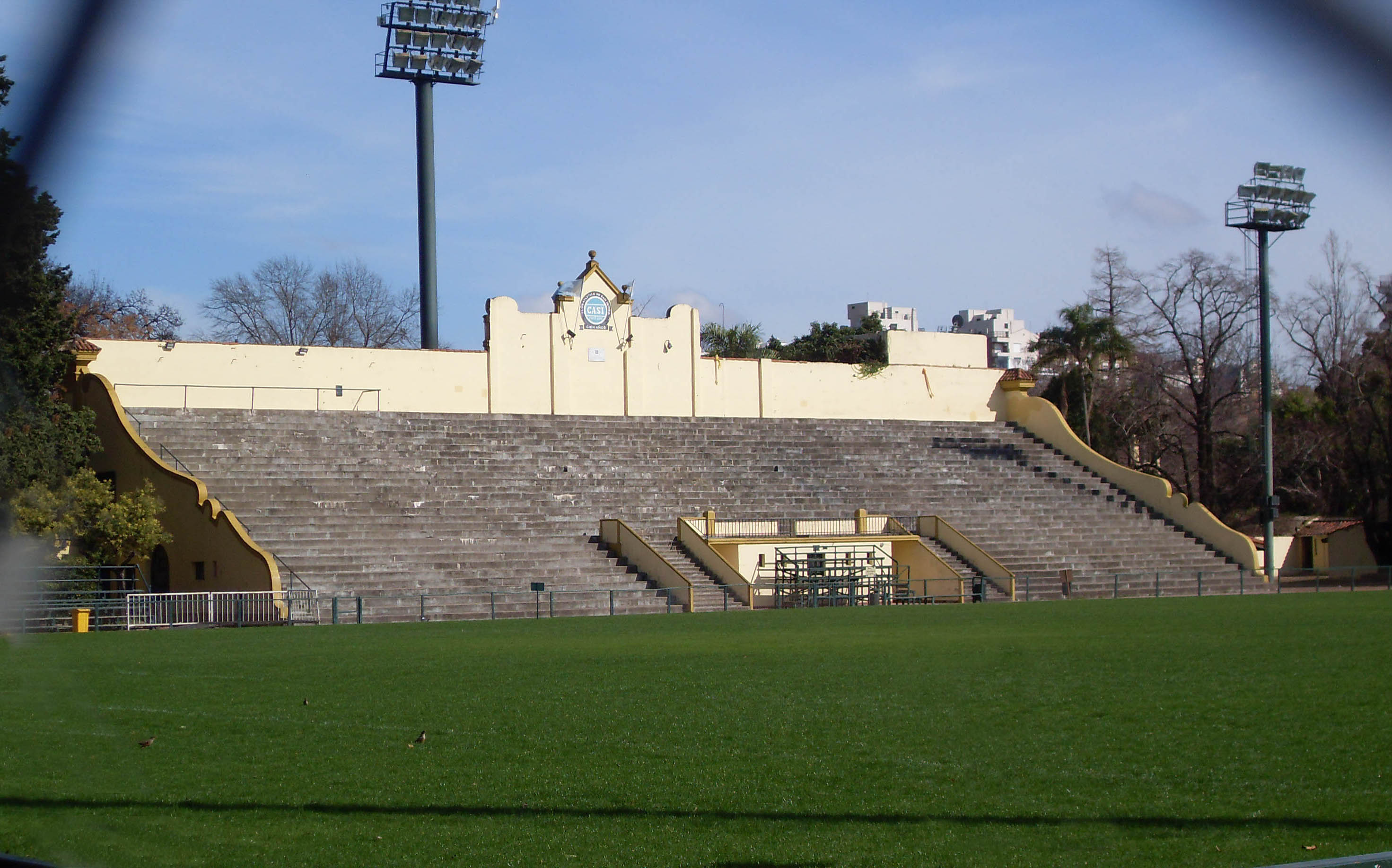
La Catedral, venue for the final

The final was held in La Catedral ("the Cathedral of rugby"), nickname of Estadio del CASI, earned due to it is distant 500 mts from the San Isidro Cathedral, a historic landmark since 1963. which has been the venue of URBA finals since 2008. The stadium, with capacity for 4,500 spectactors, is one of the oldest in Argentina so the club has always been on the same site since 1902, when Manuel Aguirre, owner of a large chacra on Sánez Peña street, gave the club a portion to settle down there.

The stadium is located in downtown San Isidro, has a lighting system for night matches and a concrete grandstand inaugurated in the 1920s. When San Isidro competed in football tournament organised by AFA, the stadium was also used for that sport.

== Road to the final ==
After the regular season, four teams qualified to the semifinals in order to decide the two clubs that played the final.

Newman		Round	SIC	
Opponent	Result	Stage	Opponent	Result
Regatas BV	26–27 (H)	Matchday 1	Los Tilos	23–27 (A)
SIC	34–24 (A)	Matchday 2	Newman	24–34 (H)
Los Tilos	21–23 (H)	Matchday 3	Hindú	32–28 (A)
Alumni	24–14 (H)	Matchday 4	Buenos Aires	27–34 (H)
Hindú	14–20 (A)	Matchday 5	La Plata	19–24 (H)
Buenos Aires	18–13 (H)	Matchday 6	CUBA	38–31 (H)
La Plata	21–17 (A)	Matchday 7	Belgrano	21–43 (A)
CUBA	21–20 (H)	Matchday 8	CASI	16–13 (H)
San Luis	19–6 (A)	Matchday 9	Belgrano	21–41 (A)
Regatas BV	38–17 (H)	Matchday 10	CASI	22–8 (H)
San Luis	20–16 (A)	Matchday 11	Alumni	48–24 (A)
Regatas BV	26–24 (A)	Matchday 12	Los Tilos	28–16 (H)
SIC	45–21 (H)	Matchday 13	Newman	21–45 (H)
Los Tilos	24–17 (A)	Matchday 14	Hindú	23–21 (H)
Alumni	30–22 (A)	Matchday 15	Buenos Aires	35–23 (A)
Hindú	34–17 (H)	Matchday 16	La Plata	26–10 (H)
Buenos Aires	32–10 (A)	Matchday 17	CUBA	38–34 (A)
La Plata	41–12 (H)	Matchday 18	Belgrano	50–39 (H)
CUBA	39–36 (A)	Matchday 19	CASI	29–33 (A)
Belgrano	35–25 (H)	Matchday 20	San Luis	20–11 (H)
CASI	16–26 (A)	Matchday 21	Regatas BV	19–15 (A)
San Luis	29–26 (H)	Matchday 22	Alumni	44–47 (H)
Pos. / Team / Pts. / P / W / T / L / PS / PC / Qualification; 1 / CASI / 80 / 22 / 18 / 0 / 4 / 643 / 465 / Semifinals; 2 / Belgrano / 76 / 22 / 17 / 0 / 5 / 756 / 580 / Semifinals; 3 / Newman / 71 / 22 / 16 / 0 / 6 / 583 / 469 / Semifinals; 4 / SIC / 70 / 22 / 15 / 0 / 7 / 658 / 565 / Semifinals
Newman		Round	SIC	
Opponent	Result	Stage	Opponent	Result
Belgrano	41–24 (N)	Semifinals	CASI	13–9 (N)

== Match ==
The game was tense from both parts in the beginning, with none of both teams willing to take risks. Lot of kicking, tough defenses, and few attacking breaks were common plays of the opening minutes. In this context, the San Isidro's side seemed a bit more comfortable using tackling as their primary weapon.

Newman had a chance to take the lead, but Gonzalo Gutiérrez Taboada missed from an easy position. Meanwhile, on the other side, the patience of a team familiar with these situations proved crucial. Even with one less player (Nicanor Acosta received a yellow card), they remained untroubled. At 38' Faustino Santarelli received a 20-minute red card for a hard tackle, further complicating things for Santiago Piccaluga's team. Santiago Pavlovsky quickly converted the penalty, opening the scoring for SIC.

However, Newman didn't give up, continuing to press and eventually getting their reward. First, Gutiérrez Taboada leveled the score with a kick, and then, in stoppage time, Marcelo Brandi scored a try which was effusively celebrated by their supporters at La Catedral. The bordó team took advantage of the situation in the second half, not only controlling the game but increasing the score with a successful attempt by Bautista Bosch. The last 20 minutes saw the team from Benavídez enduring the attempts of SIC to score any point to finally achieve their first league title.

=== Match details ===
1 Nov 2025

**Newman**	**15–3**	**SIC**
Try: Brandi 39', Bosch 59'; Con: G. Taboada 59'; Pen: G. Taboada 34'	Report	Pen: Pavlovsky 21'

Estadio del CASI, San Isidro
Attendance: 4,500
Referee: Tómas Bertazza

**Newman**
**SIC**

FB	15	Juan Bautista Daireaux
RW	14	Santiago Marolda
OC	13	Benjamín Lanfranco
IC	12	Tomás Keena		(substituted off) 54'
LW	11	Jerónimo Ulloa
FH	10	Gonzalo Gutiérrez Taboada
SH	9	Lucas Marguery
N8	8	Rodrigo Díaz de Vivar
OF	7	Joaquín de la Vega
BF	6	Faustino Santarelli	Red card	(substituted off) 38'
RL	5	Alejandro Urtubey
LL	4	Pablo Cardinal
TP	3	Bautista Bosch		(substituted off) 76'
HK	2	Marcelo Brandi
LP	1	Miguel Prince
Substitutions:
L	20	Jerónimo Ureta		(substituted on) 38'
C	23	Cruz Ulloa		(substituted on) 54'
FL	16	James Wright		(substituted on) 76'
Coaches:
(Argentina) Santiago Piccaluga (Argentina) Marcos Ayerza

FB	15	Bernabé López Fleming
RW	23	Jacinto Campbell
OC	13	Nicanor Acosta	(yellow card) 12'
IC	21	Carlos Pirán (c)
LW	11	Timoteo Silva
FH	10	Santiago Pavlovsky
SH	9	Mateo Albanese
N8	8	Tomás Meyrelles
OF	7	Santos Fernández de Oliveira		(substituted off) 60'
BF	6	Andrea Panzarini
RL	5	Manuel Curuchaga		(substituted off) 55'
LL	4	Ciro Plorutti
TP	3	Benjamín Chiapp
HK	2	Ignacio Bottazzini
LP	1	Marcos Piccinini
Substitutions:
L	19	Tomás Legarre		(substituted on) 55'
FL	20	Franco Delger		(substituted on) 60'
Coaches:
(Argentina) Eduardo Victorica (Argentina) Gonzalo Longo
