= 2022 Nacional de Clubes =

2023 Nacional de Clubes
- Event: Nacional de Clubes
| Hindú | Duendes |
| URBA | URR |
| 34 | 16 |
- Date: 19 November 2022
- Venue: Estadio de Hindú, Don Torcuato, Argentina
- Referee: Juan M. López

The 2022 Torneo Nacional de Clubes was the 26th. edition of Nacional de Clubes, a rugby union competition in Argentina organised by the Argentine Rugby Union (UAR). The final was held in Estadio de Hindú Club in the Don Torcuato district of Tigre Partido on 19 November 2022.

After a major restructuring of its tournaments carried out by the UAR, it was the first Nacional de Clubes played as a Superfinal, with only two teams contesting the competition, the champions of URBA Top 12 and Torneo del Interior.

The match was contested by Hindú (champion of 2022 URBA Top 12), which contested their 13th final, and Duendes (champion of 2023 Torneo del Interior), which played their 7th. final.

Hindú won the match 34–16 with an overwhelming production during the second half, achieving their 11th. national title (and an impressive run of six consecutive championships).

== Qualified teams ==
| Team | Qualification | Union | Previous final app. |
|---|---|---|---|
| Hindú | 2022 URBA Top 12 champion | URBA | **1996**, 1997, **2001, 2003, 2005**, 2009, **2010, 2015, 2016, 2017, 2018, 2019** |
| Duendes | 2022 Torneo del Interior champion | URR | 1999, 2003, **2004**, **2009**, **2011**, 2014 |

Note

- **Bold** indicates winning years

== Background ==
Hindú qualified as URBA champions after defeating San Isidro Club 30–25 in the 2022 URBA Top 12 final

On the other hand, Duendes qualified as champions of Torneo del Interior, where they defeated Huirapuca 38–12 in the final, achieving their 5th. regional title.

It was the 13th final contested by Hindú, which had won ten, while Duendes contested their sixth final, with three titles won. Besides, both clubs were the teams with most participations in Nacional de Clubes, Hindú played their 24th. season while Duendes their 23rd.

Hindú and Duendes also faced for 3rd. time in a national final, the previous two had been in 2003 and 2009 (with Hindú and Duendes as winners, respectively).

== Match ==
At the start, Duendes looked much more comfortable on the field than their opponent and took the lead through Valentín Di Capua. From that moment on, the Rosario-based team managed to contain the Elephants that, despite gradually approaching the try line, could not break through Duendes's back line of defense.

However, as the minutes ticked by, both teams began to lose patience and commit numerous fouls. Duendes suffered the most, eventually being reduced to two men. Nevertheless, this situation did not disrupt Duendes's dominance and they even extended their lead with another penalty from Di Capua. The Rosario team continued to commit excessive penalties, and Hindú finally managed to add to their score with a try by Agustín Capurro. However, in the brief period when Hindú slowed their pace, Duendes surprised them, extending their lead with a try by Martín Pellegrino, and thus the first half ended.

Hindú took complete control of the match from the start of the second half, and, coupled with the constant penalties from their opponent (which ultimately led to Pedro Imhoff's expulsion), they capitalized by scoring two more tries (both by Capurro).

Finally, with the home team dominating all aspects of the game, Capurro completed his four-try haul, and with another try by Torcuato Pulido, there was no time left for further goals, and Hindú secured their eleventh national title.

=== Details ===
19 Nov 2022

| **Hindú** | **34–16** | **Duendes** |
| Try: Capurro 36', 43', 74'; Pulido 80'; Con: Fernández 43', 74'; Pen: Fernández 69' | Report | Try: Pellegrino 41'; Con: Di Capua 41'; Pen: Di Capua 4', 31', 59' |

Estadio de Hindú, Don Torcuato
Referee: Juan M. López

**Hindú**
**Duendes**

| FB | 15 | Joaquín Díaz Bonilla |
| RW | 14 | Belisario Agulla | (substituted off) 78' |
| OC | 13 | Federico Graglia | (substituted off) 78' |
| IC | 12 | Joaquín de la Vega | (substituted off) 78' |
| LW | 11 | Bernabé López Fleming |
| FH | 10 | Santiago Fernández (c) |
| SH | 9 | Lucas Fernández Miranda | (substituted off) 78' |
| N8 | 8 | Nicolás Amaya |
| OF | 7 | Lautaro Bávaro |
| BF | 6 | Nicolás D'Amorin | (substituted off) 57' (substituted off) 78' |
| RL | 5 | Gonzalo Delguy | (substituted off) 78' |
| LL | 4 | Carlos Repetto |
| TP | 3 | Nicolás Leiva | (substituted off) 78' |
| HK | 2 | Agustín Capurro |
| LP | 1 | Juan Martínez Sosa | (substituted off) 78' |
Substitutions:
| | | Santino Amaya | (substituted on) 57' |
| | | Bautista Farise | (substituted on) 78' |
| | | Santino Amaya | (substituted on) 78' |
| | | Ramiro Herrera | (substituted on) 78' |
| | | Mariano Leiva | (substituted on) 78' |
| | | Franco Diviesti | (substituted on) 78' |
| | | Lucas Pulido | (substituted on) 78' |
| | | Juan Comolli | (substituted on) 78' |
| | | Torcuato Pulido | (substituted on) 78' |
Coaches:
(Argentina) Francisco Fernández Miranda (Argentina) Nicolás Fernández Miranda

| FB | 15 | Joaquín Brogliatti | | (substituted off) 67' |
| RW | 14 | Martín Pellegrino |
| OC | 13 | Francisco Diez |
| IC | 12 | Guido Chesini | | (substituted off) 51' |
| LW | 11 | Juan Rapuzzi | | (substituted off) 32' |
| FH | 10 | Valentino Di Capua | | (substituted off) 76' |
| SH | 9 | Pedro Imhoff (c) | (yellow card) (yellow-red card) 49' |
| N8 | 8 | Giuliano Buffarini |
| OF | 7 | Nicolás Sánchez | (yellow card) 36' | (substituted off) 55' |
| BF | 6 | Ignacio Fantín | | (substituted off) 64' |
| RL | 5 | Rafael Gietz |
| LL | 4 | Lorenzo Colidio |
| TP | 3 | Federico Bautista | (yellow card) 27' | (substituted off) 46' |
| HK | 2 | Bernardo Lis | | (substituted off) 64' |
| LP | 1 | Felipe Arregui | | (substituted off) 64' |
Substitutions:
| | | Ángel Angaroni | | (substituted on) 32' (substituted on) 46' |
| | | Juan Ignacio Araujo | | (substituted on) 51' |
| | | Matías Landi | | (substituted on) 55' |
| | | Román Pretz | | (substituted on) 64' |
| | | Federico Rodríguez | | (substituted on) 64' |
| | | Federico Ciancio | | (substituted on) 64' |
| | | Santiago Araujo | | (substituted on) 67' |
| | | Patricio Rodríguez Vidal | | (substituted on) 76' |
Coaches:
(Argentina) Hernán Pavani (Argentina) Maximiliano Nannini
