= Nicolás Sánchez (rugby union) =

Argentine rugby union player

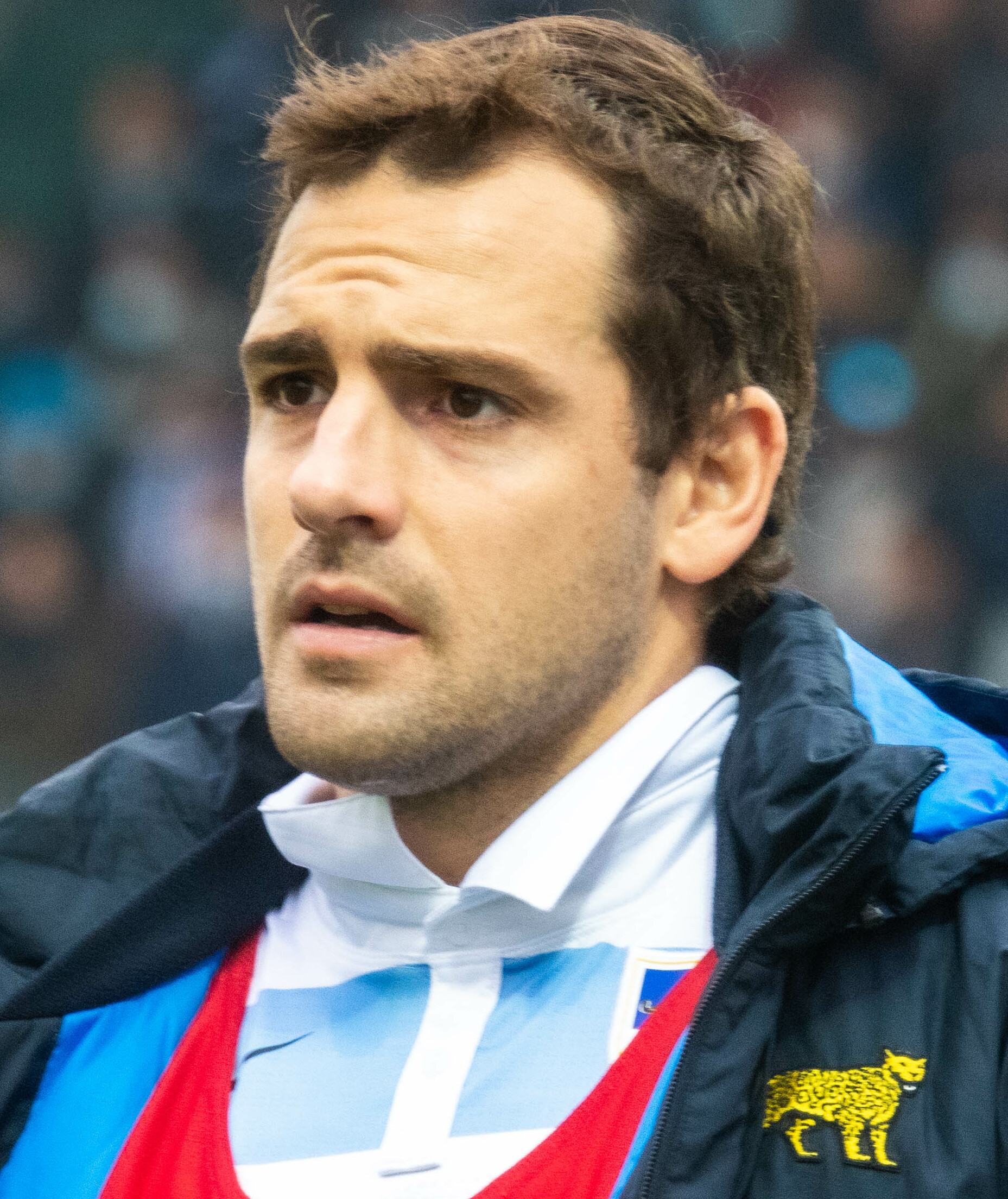
- Sánchez in 2021
- Full name: Federico Nicolás Sánchez
- Born: 26 October 1988 (age 38) Tucumán, Argentina
- Height: 1.77 m (5 ft 10 in)
- Weight: 83 kg (183 lb; 13 st 1 lb)

Rugby union career
- Position: Fly-half
Senior career
Years	Team	Apps	(Points)
2011	Pampas XV	9	(71)
2011–2014	Bordeaux Bègles	33	(138)
2014–2015	Toulon	13	(84)
2016–2018	Jaguares	40	(392)
2018–2022	Stade Français	53	(353)
2022–2023	Brive	15	(116)
2023–2024	Tokyo Sungoliath	4	(10)
2024	Lawn Tennis		
- Correct as of 24 January 2025
International career
Years	Team	Apps	(Points)
2007	Argentina U19	6	(35)
2008	Argentina U20	2	(0)
2009–2010	Argentina Jaguars	15	(70)
2010–2023	Argentina	104	(907)
- Correct as of 27 October 2023

Federico Nicolás Sánchez (born 26 October 1988) is an Argentine retired rugby union player who last played as a fly-half for Tucumán Lawn Tennis Club in the Nacional de Clubes. Sánchez is regarded as one of the greatest Argentine players ever and one of the players to have played fly half.

== Club career ==
Sánchez played for Pampas XV at the 2011 Vodacom Cup (winning this tournament) in South Africa. He moved to Bordeaux in the Top 14 in France, where he played from 2011/12 to 2013/14. He also played for RC Toulonnais from 2014 to 2015.

== International career ==
Sánchez has 100 caps for Argentina, since his debut on 21 May 2010, in a win over Uruguay, in Santiago, Chile. He has scored 11 tries, 99 conversions, 140 penalties and 12 drop goals, 709 points in total. He is the record highest point scorer for the Pumas. He participated at the 2011 Rugby World Cup where he played in one match, without scoring. He has been playing at The Rugby Championship, since the admission of the Pumas in 2012, counting currently 16 games, with 10 conversions and 28 penalties scored, 104 points in aggregate, in four presences at the competition.

Sánchez was the top scorer of the 2014 Rugby Championship with 54 points.

Sanchez was picked for the Argentina 2015 Rugby World Cup squad. He was the top point scorer in the competition with 97 points and he had the second highest number of penalties scored, finishing with 20. His display of talent in the tournament helped his team to achieve a fourth-place position.

On 8 September 2018, Sanchez overtook the long-serving former Argentinian captain Felipe Contepomi as the highest-scoring Los Pumas player in history. Sanchez scored 14 points against New Zealand on the day, taking his career points tally to 655 points from 68 tests. Sanchez's 14-point haul did not manage to lead Los Pumas to victory, however, as Los Pumas lost to the All Blacks 24–46.

Sánchez was a starter for the Argentina national team on 14 November 2020 in their first ever win against the All Blacks, scoring all 25 of Argentina's points in that test.

On 14 November 2020, in Argentina's first victory over New Zealand, Sánchez scored all twenty-five of Argentina's points scored (25–15) in the 2020 Tri Nations Series at Western Sydney Stadium, Sydney. He became the third highest-scoring player against New Zealand in a single-match, behind Morné Steyn's 31 points in 2009 and Christophe Lamaison's 28 points in the 1999 Rugby World Cup.
