= Manuel Aguirre (rugby union) =

Argentine rugby union player (born 1959)

- Born: July 28, 1959 (age 67) Buenos Aires

Rugby union career
- Position: Hooker
Senior career
Years	Team	Apps	(Points)
198?-199?	Asociación Alumni		
International career
Years	Team	Apps	(Points)
1990-1991	Argentina	3	(0)

Manuel Ernesto Aguirre (born Buenos Aires, 28 July 1959) is a former Argentine rugby union player. He played as a prop.

Aguirre played for Asociación Alumni in the Nacional de Clubes.

He had 3 caps for Argentina, without scoring. He had his first game at the 15-13 loss to England, at 4 August 1990, in Buenos Aires, aged 31 years old, in a friendly. He was called for the 1991 Rugby World Cup, where he had his last game for the "Pumas" at the 35-12 loss to Samoa, in Pontypridd.
