= 2023 Nacional de Clubes =

- Event: Nacional de Clubes
SIC	Universitario (T)
URBA	URT
25	18
- Date: 18 November 2023
- Venue: Estadio del SIC, Boulogne Sur Mer, Argentina
- Referee: Nehuén Rivero (Buenos Aires)

The 2024 Torneo Nacional de Clubes (named "Nacional de Clubes Copa Zurich" for sponsorship reasons) was the 27th. edition of Nacional de Clubes, a rugby union competition in Argentina organised by the Argentine Rugby Union (UAR). The final was held in Estadio del San Isidro Club in the Boulogne Sur Mer district of San Isidro Partido on 18 November 2023.

Just as it has been every year since 2022, the competition is contested by two teams (champions of URBA Top 12 and Torneo del Interior), which play a single superfinal match.

The match was contested by San Isidro Club (mostly known for its acronym "SIC", champion of 2023 URBA Top 12), which contested their 5th. final, and Universitario Rugby Club de Tucumán (champion of 2023 Torneo del Interior), finalists for their first time.

SIC won the match 25–18, therefore the club from Boulogne achieved their 5th. national championship.

== Qualified teams ==
Team	Qualification	Union	Previous final app.
SIC	2023 URBA Top 12 champion	URBA	**1993, 1994, 2006, 2008**
Universitario (T)	2023 Torneo del Interior champion	URT	(none)

Note

- **Bold** indicates winning years

=== Background ===
SIC qualified as URBA champions after defeating Alumni 15–12 in the 203 URBA Top 12 final

On the other hand, Universitario de Tucumán qualified as champions of Torneo del Interior, where they defeated Córdoba Athletic Club 25–21 in the final, being their first regional title. Universitario has finished 4th in the 2023 Torneo del Noroeste earning their place in the Interior championship.

It was the fifth final contested by SIC, which had won all of them (their rivals had been Tucumán R.C., La Tablada, Tala, and La Plata)

Universitario played their first final so they have never won the Interior Tournament before.

== Match ==
As expected, the Buenos Aires team had to fight to be able to carry out a complicated match against a rival that never gave up and who was encouraged to play and look for it throughout the 80 minutes. The first stage was marked by the rhythm and intensity that both teams showed, something that was seen from the beginning with Jacinto Campbell's electrifying run from midfield and passing through the visiting defense to score the first try in just 2 minutes. Universitario's response was immediate and came through Agustín López Ríos, the scrum half, who quickly got up from a ruck and scored. But again the local backs made the difference and, after a good combination from midfield, Marcos Borghi scored again. With a penalty in time by Joaquín Lamas, it was 15–5 in favor of SIC going into the break.

In the second half, the Serpents had a better start, dominating the game and marking time in the first minutes, even having some approaches by Lisandro Ahualli. Nevertheless, it was SIC that increased the score after a counter-attack led by Lamas. Nevertheless, Universitario did not resign and found a quick response from Martín Pintado, who at 41 years old made his entry from the substitute bench and had an immediate impact to close the gap again. At 55', it was 22–12 for the team from Boulogne.

From there, Universitario grew and approached their rival's goal. With two penalties from Marcos Villagra the score left 22–18. But SIC players' temperance made the difference again ensuring what would be the final 25–18 score to help the Zanjeros to win a national championship after 15 years, achieving their 5th. Nacional de Clubes title.

Summarising, it was a very even game, with both teams attacking rather defending. There were less kicks than in the final that SIC had won to Alumni some days before. SIC could have increased the score in the first half, but they missed several chances. On the other hand, Universitario pushed their rival until the end, keeping the game result urcentain until the last whistle.

=== Details ===
18 Nov 2023

**San Isidro Club**	**25–18**	**Universitario (T)**
	Report

Estadio del SIC, Boulogne Sur Mer
Referee: Nehuén Rivero (Buenos Aires)

**SIC**
**Universitario (T)**

FB	15	Francisco González Capdevilla
RW	14	Jacinto Campbell
OC	21	Carlos Pirán
IC	12	Santos Rubio
LW	11	Bernabé López Fleming
FH	10	Joaquín Lamas
SH	9	Juan Soares Gache
N8	8	Tomás Meyrelles (c)
OF	7	Alejandro Daireaux	(substituted off) 70'
BF	6	Andrea Panzarini
RL	5	Bautista Viero	(substituted off) 63'
LL	4	Marcos Borghi
TP	3	Benjamín Chiappe	(substituted off) 60'
HK	2	Ignacio Bottazzini
LP	1	Marcos Piccinini	(substituted off) 76'
Substitutions:
	18	Juan Pedro Olcese	(substituted in) 60'
	19	Pedro Georgalos	(substituted in) 63'
	20	Ciro Plorutti	(substituted in) 70'
	16	Ricardo Macchiavelo	(substituted in) 76'
Coaches:
(Argentina) Eduardo Victorica (Argentina) Federico Serra

FB	15	Marcos Villagra
RW	14	Pablo Garretón
OC	13	Tomás Vanni
IC	12	Álvaro Ferreyra	(substituted off) 54'
LW	11	Nicolás Brandán
FH	10	Luciano Valdez	(substituted off) 55'
SH	9	Agustín López Ríos	(substituted off) 51'
N8	8	Lisandro Ahualli
OF	7	Bruno Sbrocco	(substituted off) 41'
BF	6	Tomás Del Pero
RL	5	Enzo Brandán	(substituted off) 49'
LL	19	Nicolás Gentile (c)
TP	3	Francisco Moreno
HK	2	Luciano Nobau	(substituted off) 55'
LP	1	Facundo Torres	(substituted off) 41'
Substitutions:
	16	Franco Gómez Vallejo	(substituted in) 41'
	20	Thiago Sbrocco	(substituted in) 41'
	4	Jorge Herrera	(substituted in) 49'
	23	Facundo Juárez	(substituted in) 51'
	20	Martín Pintado	(substituted in) 54'
	17	Joaquín Juárez	(substituted in) 55'
	21	Ramiro Ferreyra	(substituted in) 55'
Coaches:
(Argentina) Rodrigo Honorato (Argentina) Patricio Figueroa
