= Mariano Lombardi =

Argentine rugby union footballer

- Born: Mariano Gabriel Lombardi; August 19, 1968 (age 58) Buenos Aires

Rugby union career
- Position: Second Row
Senior career
Years	Team	Apps	(Points)
198?-199?	Asociación Alumni		
International career
Years	Team	Apps	(Points)
1991	Argentina	0	(0)

Mariano Gabriel Lombardi (born 19 August 1968, in Buenos Aires) is an Argentine former rugby union player. He played as a Second Row.

He played for Asociación Alumni in the Nacional de Clubes.

He was called for Argentina for the 1991 Rugby World Cup, but would be the only player never to be capped by the "Pumas".
