= Campeonato Sudamericano de Clubes de Rugby =

Sudamericano de Clubes de Rugby
- Association: Sudamérica Rugby
- Sport: Rugby union
- Founded: 1985
- Folded: 2000; 26 years ago
- No. of teams: 4
- Region: South America
- Venue: (Various)
- Last champion: La Tablada (2000)
- Most titles: San Isidro Club (3 titles)
- Related competitions: Super Rugby Americas
- Tournament format: Single-elimination

The South American Rugby Club Championship (Campeonato Sudamericano de Clubes de Rugby), also known as the "Copa Libertadores of rugby" was a rugby union club competition held from 1985 to 2000.

The competition was contested by the reigning champions of Argentina, Chile, Paraguay, Uruguay which played under a single-elimination tournament format.

The championship was held regularly from 1985 to 1989, with four participating teams which played two semifinals. It was not held again until 1997, under the name "Torneo de las Américas" and being contested by only two teams (Argentine and Uruguayan champions) which played the final. Moreover, the Argentine representative was the Nacional de Clubes winner (Hindú) instead of the Torneo de la URBA winner as in previous editions.

The last two editions of Sudamericano (1999 and 2000) saw the return of the original format, with four teams playing the semifinals.

Campeonato Sudamericano was a predecessor to Super Rugby Americas, a franchise competition released in 2020 as "Súper Liga Americana de Rugby".

Argentine side San Isidro Club (SIC) remains as the most winning team, with 3 titles.

== History ==
=== Qualification ===
Country	Competition	Period
ARG	Torneo de la URBA	1985–89
ARG	Nacional de Clubes	1997–00
CHI	Campeonato Central de Rugby	1985–00
PAR	Campeonato Paraguayo de Rugby	1985–00
URU	Campeonato Uruguayo de Rugby	1985–00

== Champions ==
=== List of finals ===
Ed.	Year	Nat.	Champion	Score	Nat.	Runner-up	Ref.
1	1985	(Argentina)	San Isidro Club (1)	20–9	(Uruguay)	Old Christians	
2	1986	(Argentina)	C.A. San Isidro (1)	13–9	(Uruguay)	Old Christians	
3	1987	(Argentina)	Banco Nación (1)	32–22	(Uruguay)	Old Christians	
4	1988	(Argentina)	San Isidro Club (2)	48–16	(Chile)	Old Boys	
5	1989	(Argentina)	San Isidro Club (3)	37–4	(Uruguay)	Old Christians	
6	1997	(Argentina)	Hindú (1)	22–12	(Uruguay)	Carrasco	
7	1999	(Argentina)	San Cirano (1)	16–15	(Uruguay)	Carrasco	
8	2000	(Argentina)	La Tablada (1)	39–21	(Uruguay)	Carrasco	

== Titles by club ==
Club	Titles	Winning years
(Argentina) San Isidro Club	3	1985, 1986, 1989
(Argentina) C.A. San Isidro	1	1986
(Argentina) Banco Nación	1	1987
(Argentina) Hindú	1	1997
