= Francisco García (rugby union) =

Argentine rugby union player

Francisco Luis García (born 30 October 1970) is a former Argentine rugby union player. He played as a centre.

García was a player for Asociación Alumni.

He had 13 caps for Argentina, from 1994 to 1998, scoring 2 tries, 10 points in aggregate. He was called for the 1995 Rugby World Cup, but never played.
