= Ignacio Brex =

Argentine-Italian rugby union player

Ignacio "Nacho" Brex
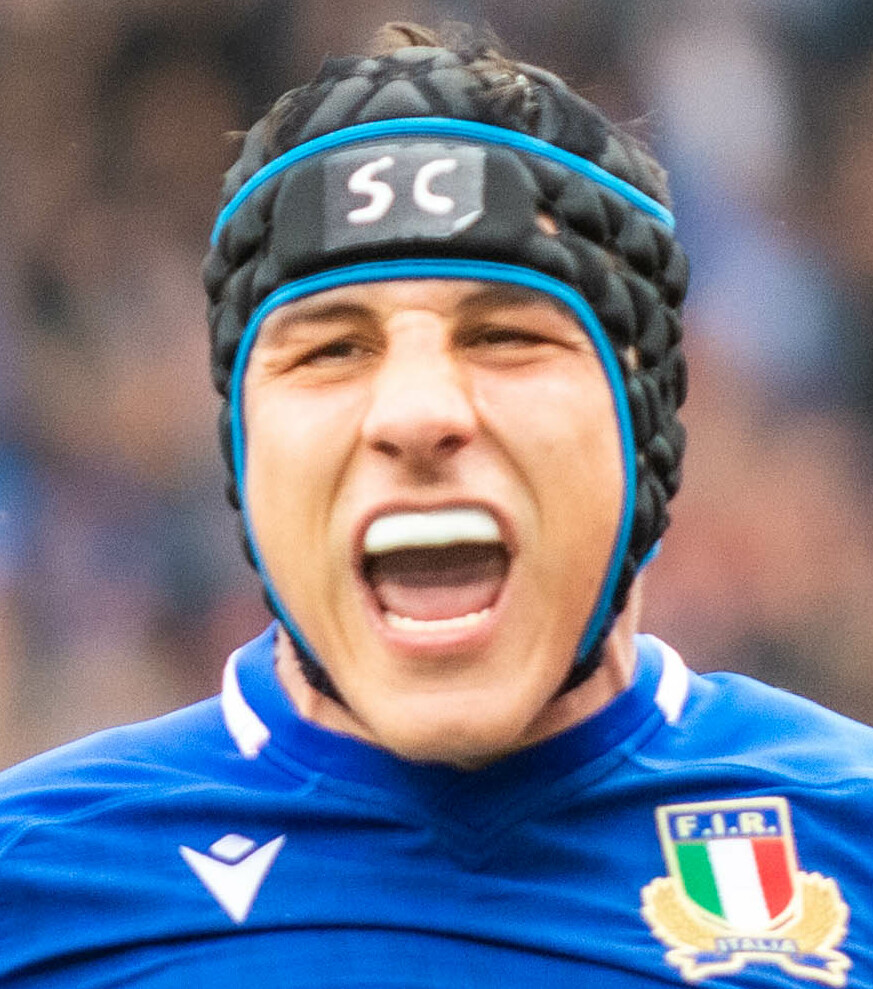
- Brex in 2023
- Full name: Juan Ignacio Brex
- Born: 26 May 1992 (age 34) Buenos Aires, Argentina
- Height: 190 cm (6 ft 3 in)
- Weight: 94 kg (207 lb; 14 st 11 lb)

Rugby union career
- Position: Centre
- Current team: Toulon
Youth career
- San Cirano
Senior career
Years	Team	Apps	(Points)
2012–2014	San Cirano	21	(45)
2013	Pampas XV	2	(0)
2015–2017	Viadana	27	(80)
2017–2025	Benetton	102	(65)
2025–	Toulon	21	(20)
- Correct as of 22 Sep 2026
International career
Years	Team	Apps	(Points)
2012	Argentina U20	4	(0)
2013–2015	Argentina XV	6	(5)
2021–	Italy	55	(40)
- Correct as of 18 Jul 2026
National sevens teams
Years	Team		Comps
2012–2014	Argentina		6
2019	Italy		1
- Correct as of 10 Sep 2023

Juan Ignacio Brex (Spanish pronunciation: [ˈbɾeks]; born 26 May 1992) is an Italian-Argentine professional rugby union player who primarily plays centre for Toulon of the French Top 14. He has also represented Italy at international level. Brex has previously played for clubs such as San Cirano, Pampas XV, and Viadana in the past. He played with Benetton in the United Rugby Championship until 2025.

== Professional career ==
Born in Argentina, Brex is of Italian descent through his father and holds dual citizenship. After playing for Argentina until 2015, in 2019 Brex was named in the Italy Sevens squad for the Qualifying Tournament for the 2020 Summer Olympics.

In January 2021, he was named in the Italy squad. On 22 August 2023, he was named in Italy's 33-man squad for the 2023 Rugby World Cup.

== Statistics ==
=== List of international test tries ===
As of 23 February 2025

Try	Opposing team	Location	Venue	Competition	Date	Result	Score
1	Samoa	Padua, Italy	Stadio Plebiscito	2022 end-of-year rugby union internationals	5 November 2022	Win	49 - 17
2	Wales	Rome, Italy	Stadio Olimpico	2023 Six Nations	11 March 2023	Loss	17 - 29
3	Romania	San Benedetto del Tronto, Italy	Stadio Riviera delle Palme	2023 RWC Warm-Ups	19 August 2023	Win	57 - 7
4	Uruguay	Nice, France	Allianz Riviera	2023 Rugby World Cup	20 September 2023	Win	38 - 17
5	Scotland	Rome, Italy	Stadio Olimpico	2024 Six Nations	9 March 2024	Win	31 - 29
6	Scotland	Edinburgh, Scotland	Murrayfield Stadium	2025 Six Nations	1 February 2025	Loss	31 - 19
7	France	Rome, Italy	Stadio Olimpico	2025 Six Nations	23 February 2025	Loss	24 - 73
8	Japan	Tokyo, Japan	Chichibunomiya Rugby Stadium	2026 Nations Championship	4 July 2026	Loss	27 - 10
