= Giovanni Maistri =

- Full name: Giovanni Maistri
- Born: 4 June 1992 (age 34) Rome, Italy
- Height: 1.91 m (6 ft 3 in)
- Weight: 107 kg (16 st 12 lb; 236 lb)

Rugby union career
- Position: Hooker
- Current team: Benetton Treviso
Amateur team(s)
| Years | Team | Apps | (Points) |
- Lazio
Senior career
| Years | Team | Apps | (Points) |
| 2011–12 | Calvisano | 16 | (5) |
| 2012–15 | Treviso | 27 | (0) |
| 2015–16 | Petrarca Padova | 7 | (0) |
- Correct as of 29 June 2013
International career
| Years | Team | Apps | (Points) |
| 2010–12 | Italy U20 | 17 | (5) |
| 2012–13 | Emerging Italy | 1 | (0) |
- Correct as of 29 June 2013

Giovanni Maistri (born 4 June 1992) is an Italian rugby union player. He plays as a hooker. He currently plays for Benetton Treviso in the Pro14.

In the 2011–12 season he played for Calvisano, whom that season completed the double and won Giovanni his first titles; National Championship of Excellence and Coppa Italia

In July 2012, Giovanni joined Pro12 side Treviso. He played his debut game against Munster on 7 Sept, coming on as a substitute.

Maistri has played in all of the Italian national youth teams, including the U-20, in which he was the captain, and with whom in 2012 he competed in the tournament U20's Six Nations and the IRB Junior World Championship .

== Honours ==
- National Championship of Excellence
  - Champions Calvisano: 2011–12
- Coppa Italia
  - Champions Calvisano: 2011–12
