= Federico Conforti =

- Born: 19 March 1992 (age 34) Padova, Italy
- Height: 1.90 m (6 ft 3 in)
- Weight: 96 kg (212 lb; 15 st 2 lb)

Rugby union career
- Position: Flanker
- Current team: Valorugby Emilia
Youth career
- Petrarca Padova
Senior career
Years	Team	Apps	(Points)
2010−2012	F.I.R. Academy		
2012−2020	Petrarca Padova	130	(40)
2016	→Benetton	1	(0)
2020−2021	Valorugby Emilia	18	(15)
- Correct as of 4 June 2020
International career
Years	Team	Apps	(Points)
2011−2012	Italy Under 20	10	(0)
2016−2018	Emerging Italy	6	(17)
- Correct as of 7 June 2020

Federico Conforti (born 10 March 1992 in Padua) is a retired Italian rugby union player. His usual position was as a Flanker.

For 2016–17 Pro12 season, he named like Additional Player for Benetton.

After playing for Italy Under 20 in 2011 and 2012, in 2016 and 2018, Conforti was also named in the Emerging Italy squad for annual World Rugby Nations Cup.
