= Luca Scarsini =

Italian rugby union player (born 1993)

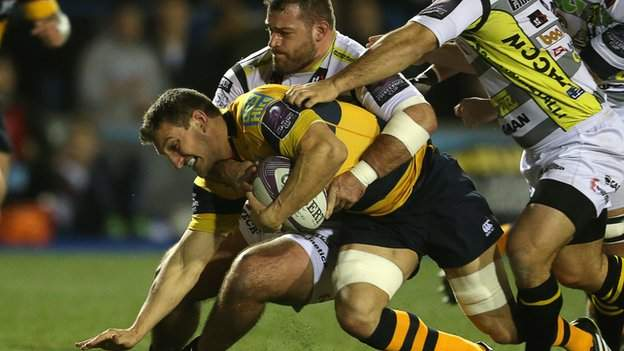
- Scarsini tackling Warburton in 2022 Challenge Cup
- Born: 14 July 1993 (age 33) Gemona del Friuli, Italy
- Height: 1.84 m (6 ft 0 in)
- Weight: 118 kg (18 st 8 lb; 260 lb)

Rugby union career
- Position: Prop
- Current team: Rugby Lyons Piacenza
Youth career
- Udine
Senior career
Years	Team	Apps	(Points)
2011−2012	F.I.R. Academy		
2012−2016	Calvisano	57	(20)
2015	→Zebre	1	(0)
2016−2020	Petrarca Padova	42	(5)
2020−2022	Lyons Piacenza	15	(0)
- Correct as of 30 June 2020
International career
Years	Team	Apps	(Points)
2012−2013	Italy Under 20	16	(0)
2014	Emerging Italy	3	(0)
- Correct as of 30 June 2020

Luca Scarsini (born 14 July 1993) is an Italian rugby union player. His usual position is as a Prop and he currently plays for Lyons Piacenza in Top12

== Career ==
Born as a loose-head prop, he now plays as tight-head prop, behind able to play in both scrum sides. Growing up in Rugby Udine youth team, he stands out so that he is called to attend the "Ivan Francescato" Academy in Tirrenia, disputing the Six Nations Under 20s Championship and the World Rugby Under 20 Trophy with the Italy national under-20 rugby team. After the tournament, in the summer of 2012, he moves to Brescia region, earning his first Italian Championship with Rugby Calvisano. In 2014, he contributes to the conquest of yet another Italian Championship of Excellence and participates in the World Rugby Tbilisi Cup 2014 with Italia Emergenti. During the summer of 2016, he moves to Petrarca Padova and, in 2018, he strongly contributes to the victory of the Italian champion title, earning his third personal Italian title after the two obtained with Rugby Calvisano.

For 2014–15 Pro12 season, he was named Permit Player for Zebre. From 2020 to 2022, Scarsini played for Lyons Piacenza in Top12.
