= Tom Steven =

Scottish footballer

Personal information
- Date of birth: 5 September 1954 (age 72)
- Place of birth: Edinburgh, Scotland
- Position: Midfielder

Senior career*
| Years | Team | Apps | (Gls) |
| –1971 | Dunbar United | | |
| 1971–1974 | Hibernian | 1 | (0) |
| 1974–1975 | Hamilton Academical | 6 | (1) |
| 1975 | Berwick Rangers | 37 | (6) |
| 1975–1976 | East Fife | 13 | (0) |
| 1976– | Forfar Athletic | 27 | (2) |
| –1980 | North Sydney | | |
| 1980 | Dunfermline Athletic | 0 | (0) |
- Edinburgh United

Managerial career
- 1995–1997: Cowdenbeath
- Edinburgh City
- * Club domestic league appearances and goals

Tom Steven (born 5 September 1954) is a Scottish retired footballer who played as a midfielder in the Scottish League for Berwick Rangers, Forfar Athletic, East Fife, Hamilton Academical and Hibernian. After his retirement as a player, he managed Cowdenbeath and Edinburgh City.

== Career statistics ==
Appearances and goals by club, season and competition
| Club | Season | League | | | National Cup | | League Cup | | Total | |
| Club | Season | Division | Apps | Goals | Apps | Goals | Apps | Goals | Apps | Goals |
|---|---|---|---|---|---|---|---|---|---|---|
| Hibernian | 1972–73 | Scottish First Division | 1 | 0 | 0 | 0 | 0 | 0 | 1 | 0 |
| Hamilton Academical | 1974–75 | Scottish Second Division | 6 | 1 | 0 | 0 | 7 | 0 | 13 | 1 |
| Forfar Athletic | 1976–77 | Scottish Second Division | 27 | 2 | 1 | 0 | 0 | 0 | 28 | 2 |
| Career total | | | 34 | 3 | 1 | 0 | 7 | 0 | 42 | 3 |
