= Vaiusu =

- Village
- Location within Samoa
- Coordinates: 13°49′50″S 171°47′55″W
- Country: Samoa
- District: Tuamasaga

Population (2016)
  - Total: 2,686
- Time zone: -11

Vaiusu is a village on the Samoan island of Upolu. It is located on the central-north coast of the island, to the west of the capital Apia. As of 2016, Vaiusu had a population of 2,686.

In 2019 the government proposed a US$100 million wharf and port project for Vaiusu, to be funded by a loan from China. Following the 2021 Samoan general election newly elected Prime Minister Fiamē Naomi Mataʻafa formally scrapped the project.

== Religion ==
The majority of the community adhere to the Catholic Church. There are also members of Islam, with a mosque located along the main road in Vaiusu-Tai and members of Assembly Of God (AOG) in Vaiusu-Uta.
