= Pedro Imhoff =

Argentine rugby union player

- Full name: Pedro José Imhoff
- Born: 1 May 1989 (age 37) Argentina
- Height: 174 cm (5 ft 9 in)
- Weight: 82 kg (181 lb; 12 st 13 lb)

Rugby union career
- Position: Scrum-half
- Current team: Dallas Jackals
Senior career
Years	Team	Apps	(Points)
2023–	Dallas Jackals	9	(0)
- Correct as of 17 March 2024
International career
Years	Team	Apps	(Points)
2013	Argentina	3	(10)
- Correct as of 17 March 2024

Pedro Imhoff (born 1 May 1989) is an Argentine rugby union player, currently playing for the Dallas Jackals in Major League Rugby (MLR). His preferred position is scrum-half.

== Early career ==
Imhoff has played club rugby for Duendes since 2009 and has captained the side. He is the brother of Argentina international Juan Imhoff.

== Professional career ==
Imhoff signed for the Dallas Jackals ahead of the 2023 Major League Rugby season, before re-signing for 2024.

Imhoff made his Argentina debut in 2013, making 3 test appearance in the 2013 South American Rugby Championship "A".
