= Tucumán Lawn Tennis Club =

Lawn Tennis
- Full name: Tucumán Lawn Tennis Club
- Nicknames: Benjamines
- Sport: List: Artistic gymnastics; Artistic roller skating; Athletics; Field hockey; Futsal; Paddle tennis; Rugby union; Squash; Swimming; Tennis
- Founded: 14 April 1915; 111 years ago
- League: Torneo del Noroeste (rugby)
- Based in: San Miguel de Tucumán, Argentina
- Colors: (white, navy blue, gold)
- Chairman: Gregorio García Biagosch
- Affiliations: URT (rugby); ATAHockey (hockey)
- Championships: 10 (rugby)
- Website: tucumanlawntennis.org.ar

Tucumán Lawn Tennis Club (or simply Lawn Tennis) is a sports club located in the city San Miguel de Tucumán in the Tucumán Province of Argentina. Founded in 1915 as a tennis club, the institution currently hosts activities such as artistic gymnastics, artistic roller skating, athletics, field hockey, futsal, paddle tennis, rugby union, squash, and swimming.

The rugby teams are affiliated to Unión de Rugby de Tucumán and compete in Torneo del Noroeste, the regional tournament held annually.

The field hockey teams are affiliated to Asociación Tucumana Amateur de Hockey (Tucumán Hockey Amateur Association, acronym "ATAHockey").

== History ==
The club was founded on 14 April 1915 in the city of San Miguel de Tucumán by a group of sportsmen composed of English and Tucuman residents, with the purpose of practicing tennis and cricket. Forty days later, the institution (which had 79 members by then) was located on land near Savoy Hotel, where two tennis courts and two cricket fields were built. Francisco Eduardo Tirbut was its first president.

In 1930, the club moved to Parque 9 de Julio, where it increased the number of tennis courts (up to 10), also adding rugby fields, swimming pool, volleyball, basketball, and paddle tennis courts, locker rooms, gyms, dining room, bar, ad gardens. In 1986, the club opened a new facility ("Anexo El Salvador") which included rugby, tennis, and field hockey fields.

The field hockey section was created in May 1970, with Nerina Rossi appointed as president of the section. Lawn Tennis was one of the founding members of Asociación Tucumana de Hockey.

In early 1960s, an internal conflict in neighbor club Natación y Gimnasia caused a group of players (who were members of Lawn Tennis) contacted president of the club, Hugo Valladares Frías, who in 1961 summoned them to an assembly to discuss the creation of a rugby section in the institution. That same year, Lawn Tennis started to play in Second Division, winning the championship and promoting to the top division for the 1962 season.

The first title in the top level came in 1973. One year later, the team started their first international tours that included the Caribbean and United States (1974 and 1976), Europe (1978), Venezuela, Mexico, Caribbean, and USA (1980). TLT participated in a tournament held in San Diego, California in 1985; the team finished 3rd (out of 32 teams). Tours continued to Australia and New Zealand (1987), Europe (1991), Caribbean and USA (1992), and South Africa (1991, 2001).

== Notable athletes ==
In hockey, the club had notable players who represented Argentina, such as Teresa Barrionuevo, Lucía Grunauer, and Ana Seyferth.

In rugby, Lawn Tennis has a large list of players in Los Pumas such as Luis Molina, Pedro Merlo, Juan Soler Vals, Álvaro Tejeda, and Dino Cáceres. In the U20 team, the club was represented by Álvaro Carrizo, Rody Navarro Marchetti, Diego Carrizo, Sliman Salim, Lucas Herrera, Andrés Holownia, Luciano Rodríguez Rey, Ramiro Rengel, José Ignacio Ghidara, Juan Varela, Carlos Cáceres, Pablo Ignacio Haustein, and Nicolás Cipulli.

== Titles ==
=== Rugby ===
- Nacional de Clubes (1): 2024
- Torneo del Noroeste (11): 1973, 1977, 1979, 1980, 1981, 1982, 2008, 2009, 2011, 2012, 2014
