= Vaiala =

- Village
- Location within Samoa
- Coordinates: 13°50′56″S 171°43′37″W
- Country: Samoa
- District: Tuamasaga

Population (2016)
  - Total: 972
- Time zone: -11

Vaiala is a village in the eastern side of Apia township on Upolu island in Samoa. It is situated on the central north coast of the island, to the east of the capital Apia. The village is in the political district of Tuamasaga.

The population is 972 (2016 Census).
