= Club San Cirano =

Argentine rugby union and field hockey club

(Argentina) San Cirano
- Full name: Club San Cirano
- Union: URBA
- Founded: 31 July 1973; 53 years ago
- Location: Villa Celina, Argentina
- Ground: Villa Celina
- Chairman: Gastón Algañaras
- League: Primera A
- 2026: 2nd. (promoted via playoffs)
Team kit

Official website
- clubsancirano.com.ar

Club San Cirano is an Argentine rugby union and field hockey club located in the Villa Celina district of La Matanza Partido. The rugby team currently plays in Primera División A, the second division of the URBA league system.

== History ==
In 1971, the "Asociación de Ex alumnos del Colegio San Cirano" was created as a social club by former pupils of San Cirano College in Buenos Aires, being named Brian Healy as its first president. Two years later, the association became a sports club and changed its name to Club San Cirano which remains nowadays. The main sport played at the club has always been rugby union, registering San Cirano with the Unión de Rugby de Buenos Aires in July 1973. In 1974 a field hockey section opened and the club registered with the Asociación Amateur Argentina de Hockey sobre Césped.

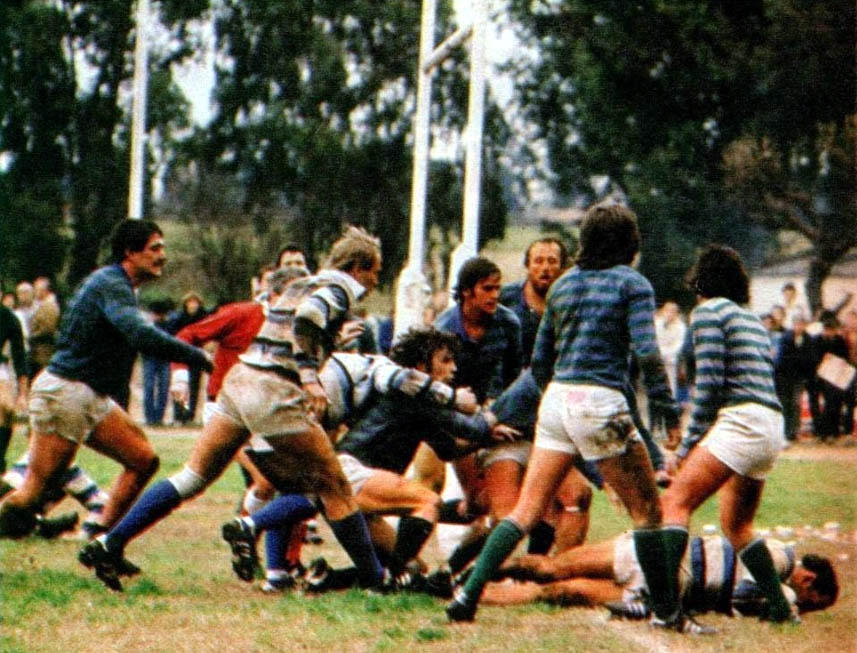
A moment of a San Cirano v SIC match, 1984

San Cirano has the particularity of having won the national title without ever winning a provincial title. In 1998, San Cirano reached the final of the Nacional de Clubes and drew with San Luis, hence sharing the title. It also has a great group of fans called "LA 36".

Today the club is mostly competitive at underage levels and has become one of the best rugby academies in Buenos Aires. In 2011, San Cirano came back to the higher category of the URBA.

In 1999, San Cirano won the "Campeonato Sudamericano", a club competition in South America held from 1985 to 2000. San Cirano qualified as winner of 1998 Nacional de Clubes (title shared with San Luis, which also took part in the competition). San Cirano eliminated Universidad Católica in semifinals and then defeated Uruguayan side Carrasco Polo 16–15, winning their first and only continental title.

== Titles ==
- Nacional de Clubes (1): 1998
- Sudamericano de Clubes (1): 1999
