= San Isidro Club =

Argentine rugby union team, based in San Isidro

(Argentina) San Isidro (SIC)
- Full name: San Isidro Club
- Union: URBA
- Nickname: Zanjero
- Founded: 14 December 1935; 90 years ago
- Location: Boulogne, Greater Buenos Aires, Argentina
- Ground: Boulogne (Capacity: 2,000)
- President: Alejandro Bleuzet
- Coach: Eduardo Victorica
- League: Top 14
- 2026: 5th.
Team kit

Official website
- sanisidroclub.com.ar

San Isidro Club (mostly known for its acronym SIC) is an Argentine amateur sports club based in the Boulogne Sur Mer district of Greater Buenos Aires. The club has gained recognition due to its rugby union team, being one of the most successful clubs of Argentina with 27 Torneo de la URBA championships won. SIC has also won 4 Nacional de Clubes tournaments.

The senior team currently competes in Top 12, the highest division of the Unión de Rugby de Buenos Aires league system while the field hockey team plays at tournaments organised by the Buenos Aires Hockey Association (AHBA). The club also has a children association football section.

== History ==
=== Origins of the club ===
In 1935 the Club Atlético San Isidro (mostly known by its acronym "CASI") played Atlético del Rosario in its home venue. After the match, CASI held the traditional meeting with the rival team in the Salón Cullen of the club, where no women attended. During the dinner, one of the guests spilled a cup of wine over his pants, which he took off and continued eating. The rest of the players that were sat at the table showed their solidarity with him and also took their pants and continued with the dinner as if nothing had happened.

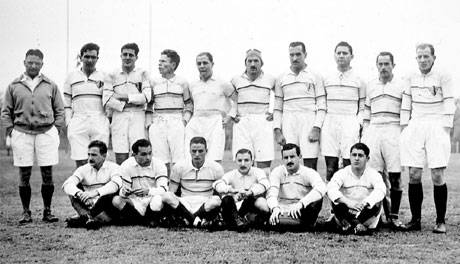
The team that won the first title for the club in 1939

This was seen by a member of the club who related the incident to club's authorities. As a result, eleven players were suspended by CASI for periods from one to two years. Since the suspension was effective, the team lost the most games played, finishing 6th at the end of the season (Atlético del Rosario was the champion). The banned players organised some friendly matches under the name "Abelleyra XV", also wearing new jerseys.

At the end of 1935 Julio Urien was elected president of CASI for a new period, therefore the banned players left the club to found their own institution, an initiative they kept in mind since the meetings with club's authorities to find a solution had been unsuccessful.

On 14 December 1935 the San Isidro Club was established in the "Quinta Pueyrredón" of San Isidro (nowadays a museum, it had been built in 1790 by Juan Martín de Pueyrredón as the place to spend his vacations. The owners rented it to the founding members for one year). The colors of the San Isidro Club were also approved in the meeting, being chosen the same colors than CASI: white, light blue (worn by the defunct football team during the amateur era) and black.

The strong rivalry between CASI and SIC has remained to date. Although it was located in the centre of San Isidro, the installations of the Quinta Pueyrredón were not able to practise sports, so SIC played its home games at the Club Arquitectura of Núñez neighborhood.

=== Consolidation ===
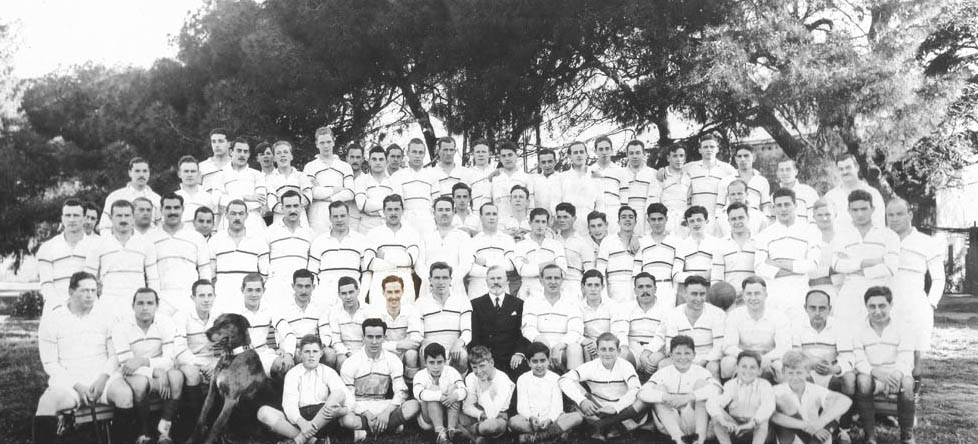
All SIC teams photographed together in 1937.

In 1939 the club moved to a land located in Boulogne, which the facilities and the stadium were built. Due to the land was crossed by a ditch, SIC was renamed as El Zanjero (The Ditch Builder). In 1939 the team won its first title, but was relegated to the lower division in 1946, but the following year SIC returned to the first division and won a new title in 1948. The team also remained undefeated during the entire tournament.

More than 20 years would pass until the next championship, in 1970. Since then, SIC has achieved a long list of titles becoming one of the most important teams of Argentina. The team also toured on Great Britain (1972) and South Africa (1973) gaining recognition. During the 1980 SIC won 6 championships. On 22 October 1987, SIC achieved a historical 22–22 draw against Australia, one of the semi-finalist teams of the recently played 1987 Rugby World Cup in New Zealand. Another highlight in SIC's history was on 1980 when the team defeated Fiji 28–11.

During the 2000s SIC has won 6 titles in 19 years. It last achievement was the 2019 URBA Top 12 championship, defeating Belgrano Athletic Club 22–19 in extra time, achieving the 26th. league title for the club.

Besides, San Isidro Club is also the most winning team of "Campeonato Sudamericano", a club competition in South America held from 1985 to 2000. The club won the first editionm then repeating in 1988 and 1988 for a total of three continental championships won.

== Rivalry ==
SIC main rival is the Club Atlético San Isidro (CASI) since both clubs were separated. This rivalry is so strong that has been nicknamed as "The Superclásico of Argentine rugby". The first match played between SIC and CASI was on 9 May 1937, being SIC the winner by 3–0. Up to April 2019, CASI and SIC have played 130 matches, with 68 won by CASI and 52 by SIC.

The largest victory achieved by SIC over CASI was in 2004, when the Zanjero won 55–18. The worst defeat at the hands of CASI, and the highest historical difference in a match between the two teams, was a 51–7 on 25 August 2013.

== Players ==
=== Historic captains ===
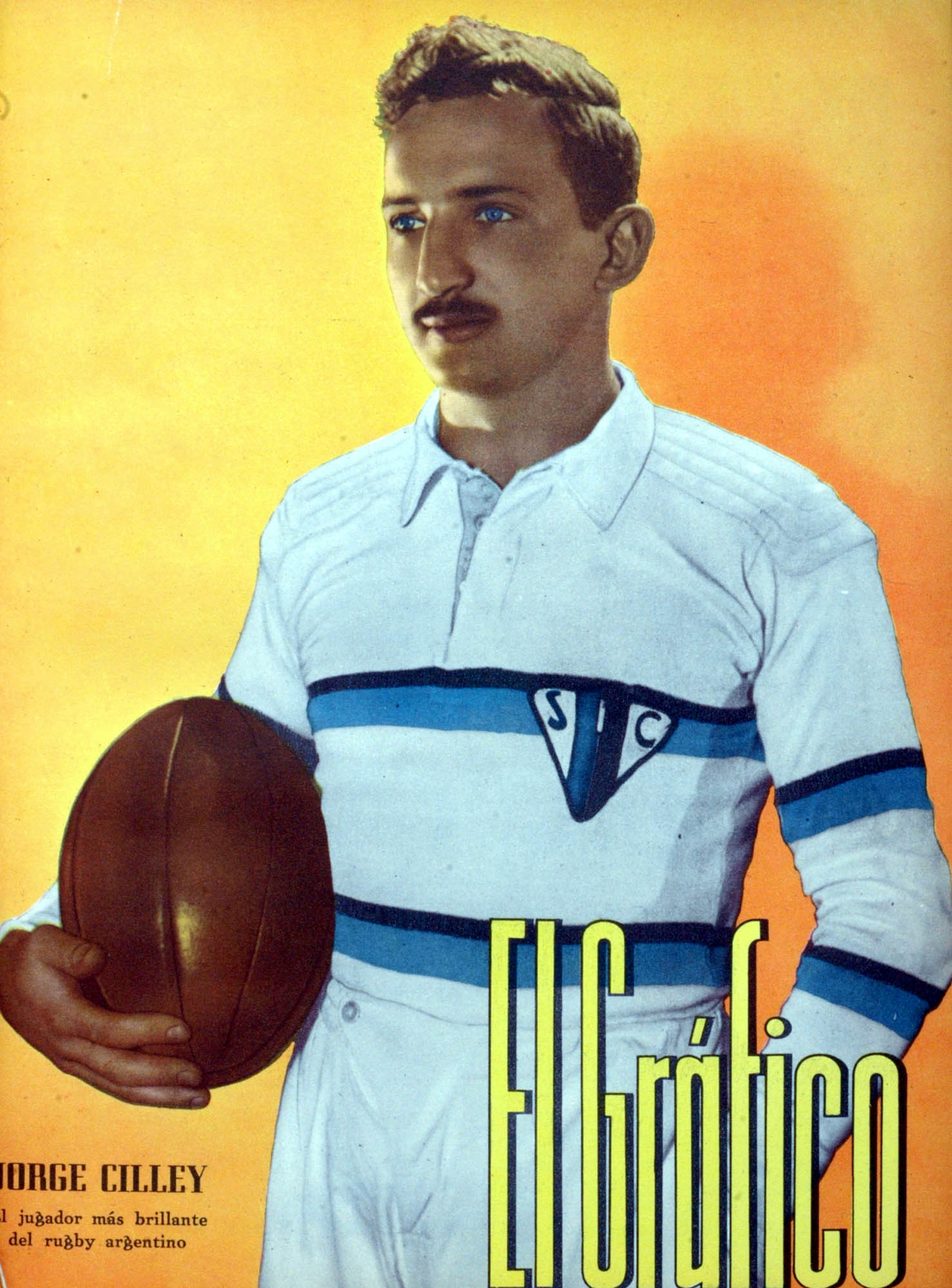
Jorge Cilley was a founding member of the club. He is considered one of the best players in club's history

Player	Position	Seasons	Years
Jorge Ciley	Centre		
Marcelo Loffreda	Centre	9	1983, 84, 85, 87, 88, 89, 90, 91, 92
Arturo Rodríguez Jurado, Jr.	Fly-half	6	1966, 67, 68, 69, 70, 77
Federico Serra Miras	Fullback	5	2006, 07, 08, 09, 10
Juan José Angelillo	Hooker	4	1993, 94, 95, 96
Benjamín Madero	Fly-half	2	2011, 12

== Titles ==
=== Rugby union ===
- Nacional de Clubes (5): 1993, 1994, 2006, 2008, 2023
- Torneo de la URBA (27): 1939, 1941, 1948, 1970, 1971, 1972, 1973, 1977, 1978, 1979, 1980, 1983, 1984, 1986, 1987

1988, 1993, 1994, 1997, 1999, 2002, 2003, 2004, 2010, 2011, 2019, 2023

- Campeonato Sudamericano (3): 1985, 1988, 1989

=== Field hockey ===
Women's

- Metropolitano Primera División (4): 1948, 1950, 1951, 1953
