= Hindú Club =

(Argentina) Hindú
- Full name: Hindú Club
- Union: URBA
- Nickname(s): Torcua, Torcuato, Elefante
- Founded: 10 October 1919; 107 years ago
- Location: Don Torcuato, Greater Buenos Aires, Argentina
- Ground: Avenida del Golf (Capacity: 5,000)
- President: Santiago Amaya
- Coach: Horacio Agulla
- League: Top 14
- 2026: 3rd. (to playoffs)
Team kit

Official website
- hinduclub.com.ar

Hindú Club is an Argentine amateur sports club based in the Don Torcuato district of Tigre Partido. The institution is mostly known for its rugby union team, which currently competes in the Top 14, the first division of the Unión de Rugby de Buenos Aires (URBA) league system. Hindú has become one of the most successful rugby teams of Argentina, having won 22 titles since 1996 to present days.

Apart from rugby, the club hosts other sports such as field hockey, football, futsal, tennis, golf, and paddle tennis.

== History ==
In the 1910s, pupils of the La Salle college met to form a theatre group, then known as "Hindustánicos". After graduation, alumni would meet again and founded in 1919 a social, cultural and sporting venture known as the Hindú Club. The origin of the club goes back more than a century when Indian laborers mostly from Bihar and Bengal were brought to South America for rubber plantation. Those immigrant workers were fundamental in founding the club in 1895, but it got its current form in 1910 with the official inauguration of the ground.

Its first location was on Pedro Echagüe street and only basketball was played there. Later the club would purchase an 83 hectare plot in Don Torcuato and start playing other sports, including rugby union for which Hindú Club is most famous today.

Hindú Club started playing rugby in 1935. However, the club had to wait until 1996 to win both its first URBA and Nacional titles. Since then, Hindú has become a powerhouse of Argentine rugby, winning several provincial and national titles.

Field hockey at Hindú began as a recreational activity for women in the 1940s. For a time, there was no official pitch available. Marta and Jorge Solá, alongside other enthusiasts, laid the groundwork for the sport's growth. In 1967, Hindú fielded its first women's team, competing in the "C" Division by 1973. Promotion to the "B" Division in 1974 marked the start of a golden era under the guidance of Héctor Scally. In 1980, led by Rodolfo "Chiche" Mendoza, the team achieved the long-awaited promotion to the "A" Division, remaining in that tier for several years. Despite the ups and downs, hockey established itself as a key sport within the club.

In 1967, Hindú Club launched its competitive tennis program, starting with three courts and Manuel Moya as instructor. In 1979, four additional clay courts were built and lighting was installed on some of them.

The 1978 FIFA World Cup marked a turning point for Hindú Club. Several European national teams stayed at its facilities, including France —led by Michel Platini— and Italy. Interest in football began to grow, and in 1985, a group of passionate members decided to take the step toward competitive play. Hindú Club became a pioneer and founding member of the "Asociación de Intercountries de Fútbol Zona Norte" (Northern Zone Inter-Country Football Association).

The first generation of players won titles during the 1980s and 1990s. Under the guidance of Ángel Celoria, the team experienced its golden era during the 2000s and 2010s. Furthermore, the club's facilities became a preferred choice for several Primera División clubs —such as Boca Juniors, River Plate, Racing, Independiente, San Lorenzo, Vélez Sarsfield, and Tigre— to hold training sessions and pre-match camps.

On December 8, 2007, the club inaugurated its first synthetic turf field hockey pitch.

== Notable players ==
=== Rugby ===
Famous players include Argentina internationals Hernán Senillosa, Gonzalo Quesada, Nicolás Fernández Miranda, Juan Fernández Miranda, Lucas Ostiglia, Juan Ignacio Gauthier and Horacio Agulla. Recent players like Joaquín "Tito" Diaz Bonilla, Sebastián "Erre" Cancelliere and Tomás Lavanini are also part of the generational "seeds" that came into the international picture after the previous big names mentioned above.

== Titles ==
=== Rugby ===
- Nacional de Clubes (11): 1996, 2001, 2003, 2005, 2010, 2015, 2016, 2017, 2018, 2019, 2022
- Torneo de la URBA (11): 1996, 1998, 2006, 2007, 2008, 2009, 2012, 2014, 2015, 2017, 2022
- Sudamericano de Clubes (1): 1997

=== Field hockey ===
- Primera C (1): 2013

=== Football ===
- Categoría Libres (3): 1986, 1989, 1992
- Categoría Selección (7): 2004, 2007, 2008, 2009, 2001, 2017, 2018
