= Asociación Alumni =

Argentinian rugby union club, based in Buenos Aires

(Argentina) Alumni
- Full name: Asociación Alumni
- Union: URBA
- Founded: 13 December 1951 (74 years ago)
- Location: Tortuguitas, Argentina
- Ground: Tortuguitas
- President: Agustín Raybaud
- Coach: Guillermo Ibáñez
- League: Top 14
- 2026: 4th (to playoffs)
Team kit

Official website
- alumni.com.ar

Asociación Alumni, usually just Alumni, is an Argentine amateur rugby union club located in Tortuguitas, Greater Buenos Aires. The senior squad currently competes at Top 12, the first division of the Unión de Rugby de Buenos Aires league system.

The club has ties with former football club Alumni because both were established by Buenos Aires English High School students.

== History ==
=== Background ===
The first club with the name "Alumni" played association football, having been found in 1898 by students of Buenos Aires English High School (BAEHS) along with director Alexander Watson Hutton. Originally under the name "English High School A.C.", the team would be later obliged by the Association to change its name, therefore "Alumni" was chosen, following a proposal by Carlos Bowers, a former student of the school.

Alumni was the most successful team during the first years of Argentine football, winning 10 of 14 league championships contested. Alumni is still considered the first great football team in the country. Alumni was reorganised in 1908, "in order to encourage people to practise all kinds of sports, specially football". This was the last try to develop itself as a sports club rather than just as a football team, as Lomas, Belgrano and Quilmes had successfully done in the past, but the efforts were not enough. Alumni played its last game in 1911 and was definitely dissolved on April 24, 1913.

=== Rebirth through rugby ===
In 1951, two guards of the BAEHS, Daniel Ginhson (also a former player of Buenos Aires F.C.) and Guillermo Cubelli, supported by the school's alumni and fathers of the students, decided to establish a club focused on rugby union exclusively. Former players of Alumni football club and descendants of other players already dead gave their permission to use the name "Alumni".

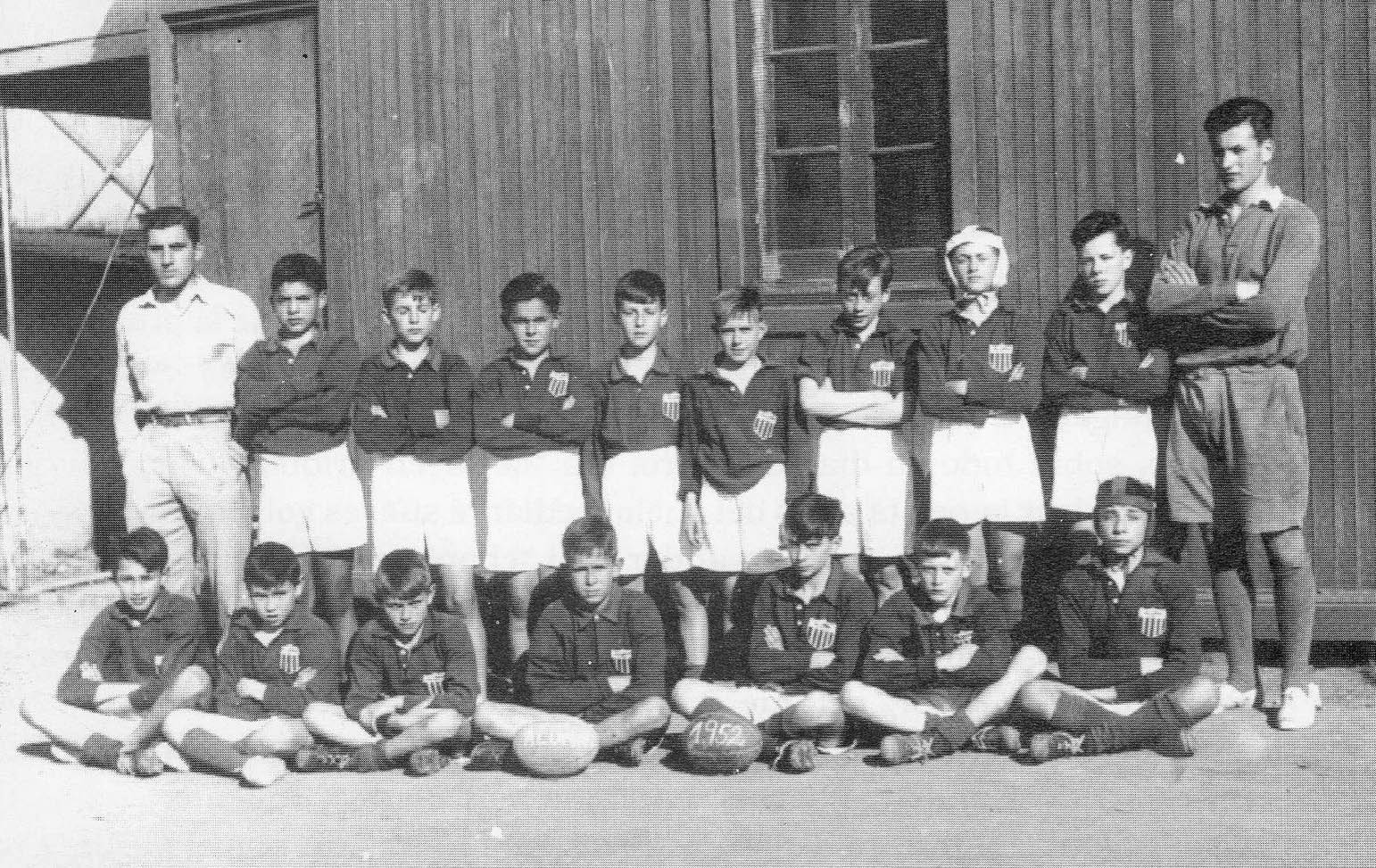
Youth team of Alumni in 1952

On December 13, in a meeting presided by Carlos Bowers himself (who had proposed the name "Alumni" to the original football team 50 years before), the club was officially established under the name "Asociación Juvenil Alumni", also adopting the same colors as its predecessor.

The team achieved good results and in 1960 the club presented a team that won the third division of the Buenos Aires league, reaching the second division. Since then, Alumni has played at the highest level of Argentine rugby and its rivalry with Belgrano Athletic Club is one of the fiercest local derbies in Buenos Aires. Alumni would later climb up to the first division winning 5 titles: 4 consecutive between 1989 and 1992, and the other in 2001.

In 2002, Alumni won its first Nacional de Clubes title, defeating Jockey Club de Rosario 23–21 in the final.

== Players ==
=== Pumas players ===
Some players that debuted in Alumni and have played for Argentina are:

- Manuel Aguirre
- Miguel Avramovic (1998–2006, 2013–14)
- Gonzalo Camardón (1988–99)
- Rafael Carballo
- Francisco García
- Santiago González Iglesias (2009–14)
- Santiago Montagner (2014–19, 2023–?)
- Sebastián Salvat (1986–2001)
- Alberto Vernet Basualdo (2002–07)
- Pablo Matera

=== Other players ===
- (Argentina) Gaspar Baldunciel (2015–22)
- (Uruguay) Diego Lamelas (2015–)
- (Argentina) Mariano Lombardi (2015–)

== Honours ==
- Nacional de Clubes (1): 2002
- Torneo de la URBA (7): 1989, 1990, 1991, 1992, 2001, 2018, 2024
