= Nacional de Clubes =

Argentine rugby union tournament

Torneo Nacional de Clubes
- Current season, competition or edition: 2025
- Sport: Rugby union
- Founded: 1993
- First season: 1993; 33 years ago
- No. of teams: 2
- Country: Argentina
- Confederation: UAR
- Most recent champion: Newman (2025)
- Most titles: Hindú (11 titles)
- Broadcasters: ESPN; DirecTV
- Level on pyramid: 1
- Related competitions: URBA Top 12; Torneo del Interior
- Website: uar.com.ar/nacionaldeclubes

The Torneo Nacional de Clubes is a club rugby union competition in Argentina, organised by the Argentine Rugby Union (UAR). The Nacional de Clubes is the main club competition in Argentine rugby, being contested by the winners of Torneo de la URBA (Buenos Aires Province) and Torneo del Interior (rest of provinces of Argentina), which play a single match final to define the national champion.

In its inaugural season, the tournament was contested by 16 teams, 8 from Buenos Aires and 8 from the rest of the provinces of Argentina. The competition has suffered several changes of rules and number of participants until present days. There was also a second division, "Nacional de Clubes B", with a similar format., held from 1993 to 2018, when the UAR reorganised all its tournaments.

With 11 titles (five of them won consecutively), Hindú is the Nacional de Clubes' most successful team.

== History ==
From 1993 to 2008, the competition involved 16 clubs, which were divided into four zones. The top two clubs of each zone qualified for the quarter-finals of the competition. The 16 best placed clubs in their respective regional championships were eligible to play the Nacional de Clubes. The number of teams were determined were: eight from Buenos Aires, two each from the Noroeste, Litoral and Córdoba and one from both Cuyo and Mar del Plata.

Due to scheduling problems, in 2009 the UAR re-launched the Torneo del Interior, a competition that involved clubs from all provincial unions outside Buenos Aires. The new formula of this tournament coincided with a complete overhaul of the Nacional de Clubes system, so the competition was contested by only 4 teams, 2 from the Torneo del Interior and 2 from URBA.

That format remained until 2013, when the UAR announced that after a three-year hiatus, the Nacional de Clubes would return with the original 16 team format since the 2014 edition, with 9 qualifying from the Torneo del Interior and 7 from the Buenos Aires Union.

The UAR changed the tournament's format in 2019, with Torneo del Interior as a qualifier and the expansion from 16 to 24 participant clubs.

Despite the changes introduced, the UAR modified the system in 2020, reducing the number of participants from 24 to only 4 so it would be contested by the finalists of URBA and Torneo del Interior A, which played two semifinals and one final, similar to 2009–2011 seasons format. Those changes were implemented due to the high number of matches in Argentine rugby and the creation of Super Rugby Americas ("Súperliga Americana de Rugby" by then) Nevertheless, the COVID-19 pandemic in Argentina forced the UAR to suspend all its competitions and Nacional de Clubes was not held during 2020 and 2021.

Starting from the 2022 season, the tournament was modified again, reducing the number of clubs to only two teams (champions of URBA and Torneo del Interior A), which play a single superfinal match.

== Champions ==
Below are detailed all the final results:

Ed.	Season	Champion	Score	Runner-up	Venue	City	Ref.
1	1993	San Isidro Club (1)	27–19	Tucumán R.C.	Estadio GEBA	Buenos Aires	
2	1994	San Isidro Club (2)	28–12	La Tablada	Estadio BACRC	Villa de Mayo (Note: The club had moved to Victoria in 1987. The first year there, the team played their home venues at Hindú Stadium. In 1988, they moved to a field in Villa de Mayo next to Route 202.)	
3	1995	CA San Isidro (1)	19–06	La Plata	Estadio BACRC	Villa de Mayo	
4	1996	Hindú (1)	21–11	Alumni	Estadio BACRC	Villa de Mayo	
5	1997	Jockey Club (R) (1)	24–14	Hindú	Estadio BACRC	Los Polvorines (Note: BACRC's inaugurated a rugby-specific stadium in 1997 (the first in Argentina), which operated until 2005.)	
6	1998	San Cirano (1) (Note: Both teams were declared champions after the match finished in a tie.)	22–22	(none)	Estadio del CASI	San Isidro	
6	1998	San Luis (1)	22–22	(none)	Estadio del CASI	San Isidro	
7	1999	La Tablada (1)	23–22	Duendes	Estadio La Tablada	Córdoba	
–	2000	(Not held)					
8	2001	Hindú (2)	27–14	Alumni	Estadio BACRC	Los Polvorines	
9	2002	Alumni (1)	23–21	Jockey Club (Rosario)	Estadio Alumni	Tortuguitas	
10	2003	Hindú (3)	31–27	Duendes	Estadio Hindú	Don Torcuato	
11	2004	Duendes (1)	32–21	Los Tarcos	Estadio Duendes RC	Rosario	
12	2005	Hindú (4)	17–13	San Luis	Arelauquen C&GC (Note: Complete name, Arelauquen Country & Golf Club.)	Bariloche	
13	2006	San Isidro Club (3)	17–13	Tala	Estadio del SIC	Boulogne	
14	2007	La Plata (1)	32–13	Tucumán	Estadio La Plata RC	Gonnet	
15	2008	San Isidro Club (4)	33–8	La Plata	Estadio del SIC	Boulogne	
16	2009	Duendes (2)	28–18	Hindú	Estadio Duendes RC	Rosario	
17	2010	Hindú (5)	25–22	La Tablada	Estadio Hindú	Don Torcuato	
18	2011	Duendes (3)	26–23	La Tablada	Estadio Duendes RC	Rosario	
–	2012–13	(Not held)					
19	2014	Universitario (BA) (1)	21–20	Duendes	Estadio CUBA	Villa de Mayo	
20	2015	Hindú (6)	27–25	Newman	Estadio Timothy O'Brien	Benavídez	
21	2016	Hindú (7)	38–23	Belgrano A.C.	Estadio Belgrano Athletic	Buenos Aires	
22	2017	Hindú (8)	20–10	Tala	Estadio del CASI	San Isidro	
23	2018	Hindú (9)	25–0	Newman	José Amalfitani Stadium	Buenos Aires	
24	2019	Hindú (10)	18–13	Jockey Club (Rosario)	Estadio Hindú	Don Torcuato	
–	2020–21	(Not held due to COVID-19 pandemic)					
25	2022	Hindú (11)	34–16	Duendes	Estadio Hindú	Don Torcuato	
26	2023	San Isidro Club (5)	25–18	Universitario (Tucumán)	Estadio del SIC	Boulogne	
27	2024	Tucumán LT (1)	22–17	Alumni	La Caldera del Parque	Tucumán	
28	2025	Newman (1)	38–15	Marista	Estadio Timothy O'Brien	Benavídez	

== Titles by club ==
Team	Titles	Years won
Hindú	11	1996, 2001, 2003, 2005, 2010, 2015, 2016, 2017, 2018, 2019, 2022
San Isidro Club	5	1993, 1994, 2006, 2008, 2023
Duendes	3	2004, 2009, 2011
CA San Isidro	1	1995
Jockey Club (Rosario)	1	1997
San Cirano	1	1998
San Luis	1	1998
La Tablada	1	1999
Alumni	1	2002
La Plata	1	2007
Universitario (BA)	1	2014
Tucumán Lawn Tennis	1	2024
Newman	1	2025
