= Béccar =

Beccar
- Town
- Location in Greater Buenos Aires
- Coordinates: 34°28′S 58°31′W
- Country: Argentina
- Province: Buenos Aires
- Partido: San Isidro
- Elevation: 11 m (36 ft)

Population (2001 census [INDEC])
  - Total: 58,811
- CPA Base: B 1643
- Area code: +54 11

Beccar is a town located 17 km (11 mi) north of the Buenos Aires metropolitan area in the Buenos Aires Province, Argentina. It is part of the partido of San Isidro in Gran Buenos Aires. It is situated close to the historic town of San Isidro and it is characterized by tree lined streets and plazas, red tiled roofed style chalets, high-rise apartment buildings that line the Avenida Centenario zone and by being close to the coast of Rio de la Plata river and yacht clubs. Nearby there is a large shanty town (Villa La Cava). Beccar is served by a 10-minute walk to scenic Tren de la Costa light rail line at Punta Chica station and the commuter railway at Beccar station with easy access to Buenos Aires city centre and the weekend retreat of the Village of Tigre.

== F.I.N.C.A. Béccar ==
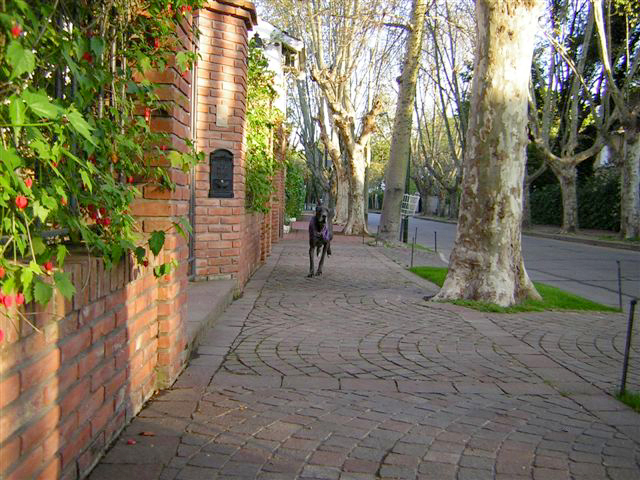
Dog walking on vintage stone paths with brick walls in linden tree-lined neighborhood of Béccar

In the town of Beccar, in the mid-1930s, a young German immigrant entrepreneur, Dr. Erich Zeyen, who together with an associate friend, Dr. Germán Wernicke, created a building firm, F.I.N.C.A. Sociedad Anónima Argentina de Ahorro (Joint Stock Company of Argentina). Soon the small company began to acquire importance and built their first planned community, F.I.N.C.A. Béccar within the town.

== Notable residents ==
- Adolfo Pérez Esquivel, architect and 1980 Nobel Peace Prize recipient
- Victoria Ocampo, intellectual and writer, former owner of the Villa Ocampo residence
- Tomás Martínez, football player for Houston Dynamo FC in the MLS.
- Martina Stoessel
- Héctor Germán Oesterheld, journalist and comics editor, murdered under the Videla military dictatorship.

== See also ==
- Ciudad Jardín Lomas del Palomar
