= San Isidro Partido =

San Isidro Partido de San Isidro
- Department
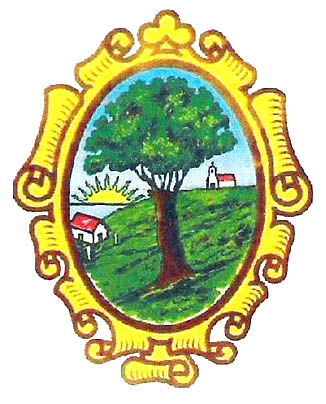
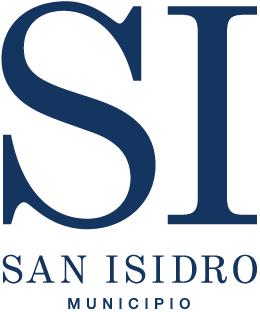
- Coat of arms Logo

- location of San Isidro Partido in Gran Buenos Aires
- Coordinates: 34°28′S 58°30′W
- Country: Argentina
- Established: 1784
- Founder: Domingo de Acassuso
- Seat: San Isidro

Government
  - Intendant: Ramón Lanús (JxC)

Area
  - Total: 51.44 km^{2} (19.86 sq mi)

Population
  - Total: 291,608
  - Density: 5,669/km^{2} (14,680/sq mi)
- Demonym: sanisidrense
- Postal Code: B1642
- IFAM: BUE115
- Area Code: 011
- Patron saint: San Isidro Labrador
- Website: www.sanisidro.gob.ar

San Isidro is an affluent partido of Buenos Aires Province, Argentina found in the north of Greater Buenos Aires. Its capital is the city of San Isidro. It is 21 km (13 mi) from the city of Buenos Aires.

The founder of San Isidro was Domingo de Acassuso, who built a cathedral in 1706 dedicated to San Isidro Labrador, having seen him in a dream. Other towns in the municipality are Acassuso, Beccar, Boulougne, Martínez, and Villa Adelina.

The area of the partido is 51.44 km^{2} (19.9 sq mi). In 2010 there were 291,608 inhabitants. San Isidro borders on the partidos of Tigre, Vicente López, San Martín and San Fernando.

== Districts ==
- Acassuso
- Béccar
- Boulogne Sur Mer
- Martínez
- San Isidro
- Villa Adelina

== Cathedral ==
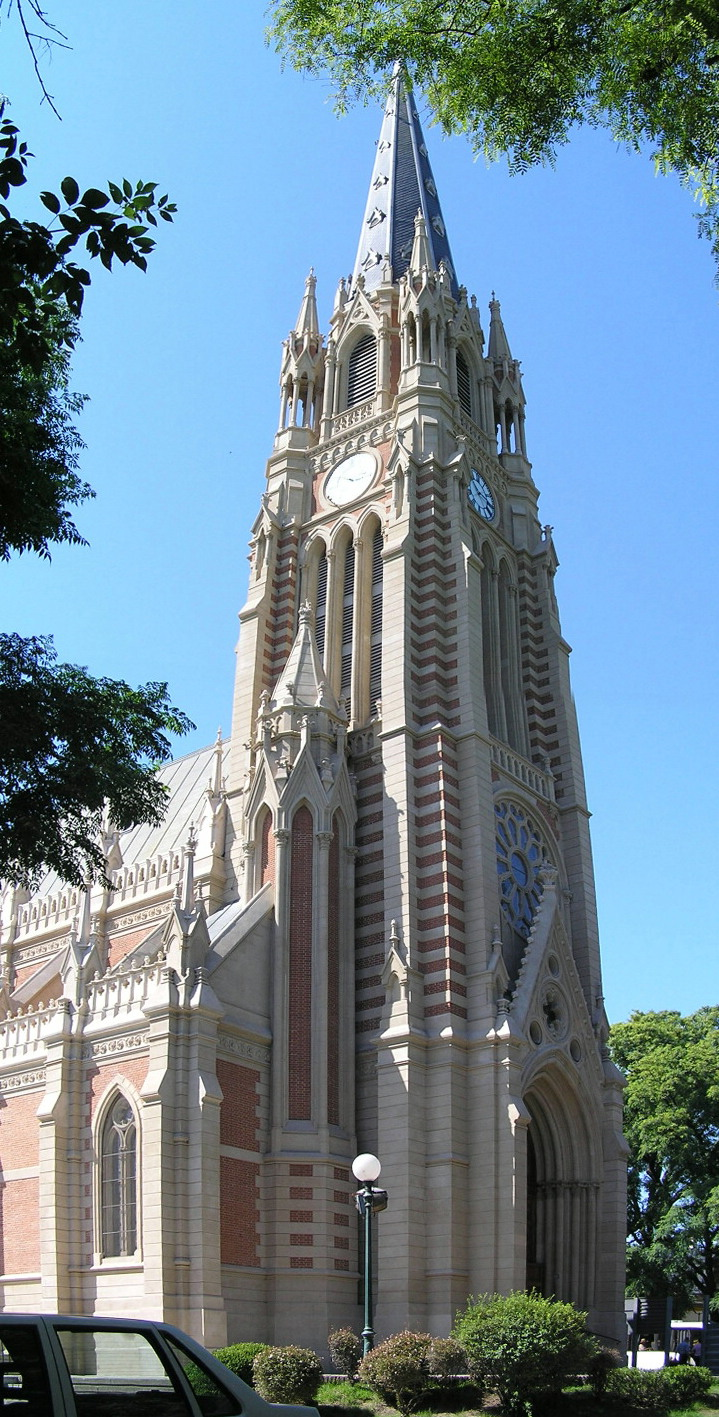
Catedral de San Isidro.

The San Isidro cathedral (Catedral de San Isidro in Spanish) was completed on July 14, 1898. Constructed in Neo-Gothic style, it stands 68 m (223 ft) tall. It is located opposite Plaza Mitre in San Isidro's historic quarter.

== Sports ==
=== Football ===
San Isidro is home to Club Atlético Acassuso, a football club that currently plays in the regionalised 3rd Division.

=== Horse racing ===
San Isidro is home to a historically prominent Jockey Club, that runs San Isidro's world-class race track, the Hipódromo de San Isidro.

=== Rugby ===
San Isidro is the national capital of Rugby and home to two of the most important rugby clubs in the country - SIC (San Isidro Club) and CASI (Club Atlético San Isidro).

=== Sailing ===
There are a number of sailing clubs on the Río de la Plata.

== See also ==
- Hospital Central de San Isidro
- Catedral de San Isidro
- Colegio Nacional de San Isidro
