= Colegio Nacional de San Isidro =

Public high school in Buenos Aires, Argentina

Coordinates: 34°28′15.88″S 58°30′37.38″W

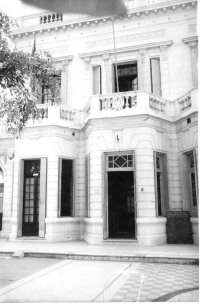
Colegio Nacional de San Isidro
Authorities
Rector:	Elvira Latrónico.
Vice chancellors
Day shift:	Margarita Fernández.
Afternoon shift:	David Luzzi.
General dates
Type:	Public secondary, Coeducational
Dependency:	Provincial Gov. Transferring to University of Buenos Aires.
Duration:	Five years.
Admission:	Annual ingrese exam.
Languages:	English, French and Italian.
Sports:	Gymnastics, handball, softball, swimming y volleyball.
Students:	1360 (estimated)
Official Website

The Colegio Nacional de San Isidro (CNSI) is a public high school located in San Isidro, Buenos Aires, Argentina.

== History ==
It opened in March 1916, by a decree approving the plan for it, and was officially founded on May 10, 1916, under the name of "Escuela Intermedia de San Isidro" (literally: Intermediate School of San Isidro), by a decree signed by Dr. Victorino de la Plaza, the President of the Argentine Nation, and Dr. Carlos Saavedra Lamas, the Minister of Justice and Public Instruction, at that time. This decree appointed Dr. José María Pirán as pro bono Principal (in Spanish: "Director ad honorem"). After one year, the name of the school was changed to "Colegio Nacional San Isidro", upon the passing of the new Budget Law of 1917, and a decree dated May 11 of 1917, signed by President Dr. Hipólito Yrigoyen and José C. Salinas, Minister of Justice and Public Instruction, appointed Dr. José María Pirán as the Principal (in Spanish: "Rector"), as well as appointing the Treasurer and several professors, by name.

== Location ==
It is located at 165 Acassuso (the address in Spanish would show the street number last), in San Isidro City, Buenos Aires Province, near the San Isidro Cathedral. It is within walking distance to stops from bus lines 203, 333, 365, 168 and 707, to the San Isidro train station of the "Mitre" line (Actual Tba Company) or the Tren de la Costa. It is nearby the two main arteries, Del Libertador Av. and Centenario Av., that connect the northern suburbs of Greater Buenos Aires with the downtown federal district.

== Admission exam ==
Every year, students who are interested in entering the Nacional San Isidro must attend a three-month-long admission course that meets daily. In this course, students are assessed in four different areas: Mathematics, Geography, Linguistics and History. This course is similar to the admission courses from the renowned Colegio Nacional de Buenos Aires and Escuela Superior de Comercio Carlos Pellegrini. The average of all assessments is computed as the final grade for the course, and the top 500 students are admitted, though the passing grade is 4 (on a scale of 1-10). An average of about 1500 enroll in the admission course each year. The top 10 can choose the shift they will attend (morning or afternoon). The remaining 490 students are assigned a shift by means of a public drawing. However, students with a brother or sister enrolled in the school can choose the same shift as their sibling and avoid having to draw for a shift.

== Curriculum ==
The C.N.S.I. is the only public high school in Argentina (excepting the Ciudad Autónoma de Buenos Aires) that is not officially part of the Education System made by the Ministry of Education.
