= San Isidro Cathedral =

Roman Catholic cathedral in San Isidro, Argentina

Coordinates: 34°28′02″S 58°30′33″W

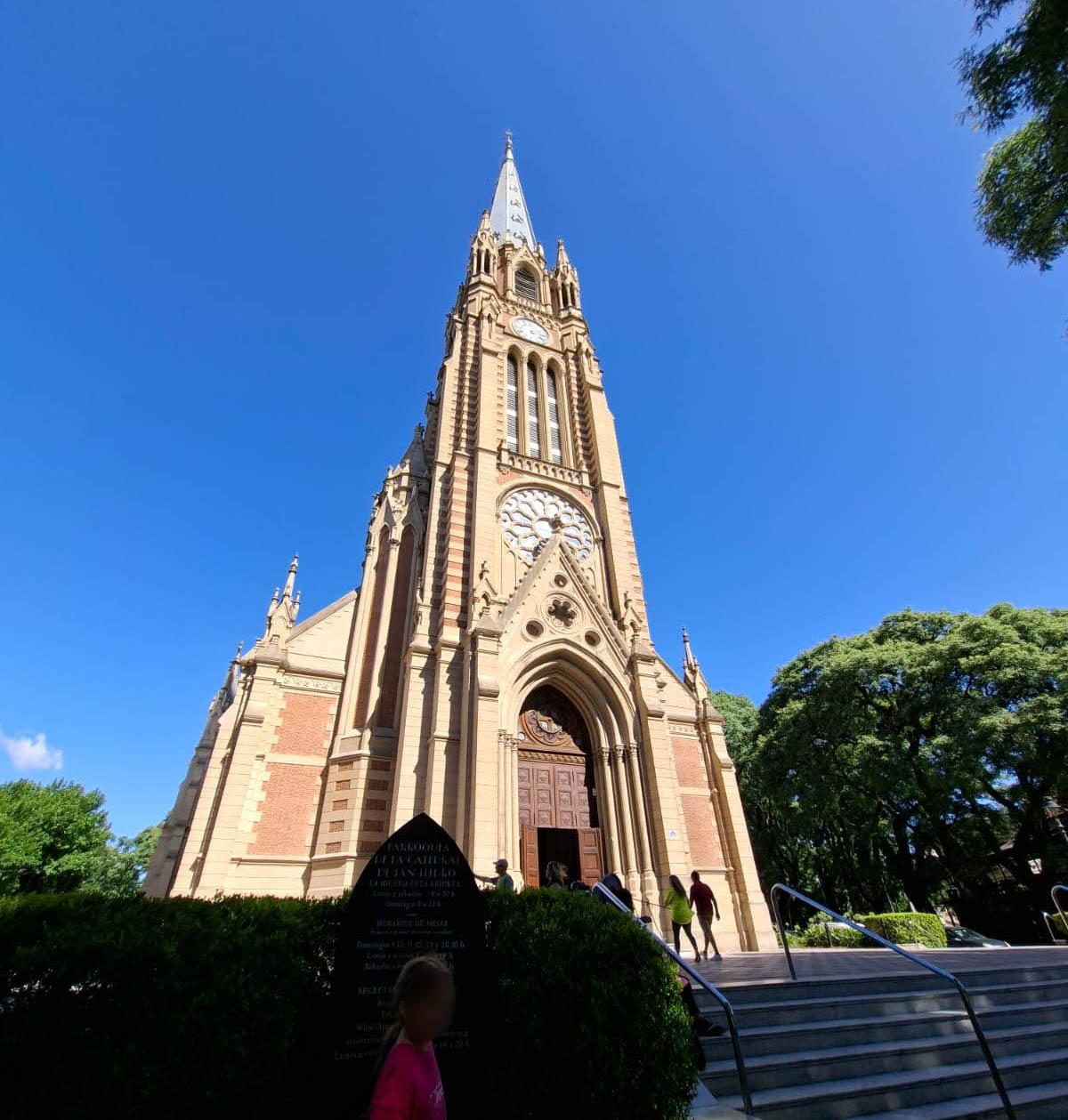
- Front view of the Cathedral in January 2026
- San Isidro Cathedral
- Address: Av. del Libertador 16000; San Isidro
- Country: Argentina
- Denomination: Catholic
- Website: catedraldesanisidro.org

History
- Consecrated: 20 October 1906

Architecture
- Architect(s): Jacques Dunant; Charles Paquin
- Architectural type: Neogothic
- Groundbreaking: 6 October 1895
- Completed: 14 May 1898; 128 years ago

Specifications
- Length: 60 metres (200 ft)
- Width: 18.5 metres (61 ft)
- Height: 68.6 metres (225 ft)

Administration
- Diocese: San Isidro

The San Isidro Cathedral is located in the city of San Isidro, in the province of Buenos Aires, Argentina. The main temple of the Diocese of San Isidro, the cathedral is at 16200th Del Libertador Avenue, opposite Plaza Mitre or Plaza de San Isidro in San Isidro's historic quarter.

Inaugurated in 1898, The building is one of the most notable examples of gothic revival architecture in Argentina. It features three naves upon a Latin cross base. Its main tower has a height of 68.6 m (225 ft).

The site where the Cathedral erects was declared "National Historic Place" in 1963.

== History ==
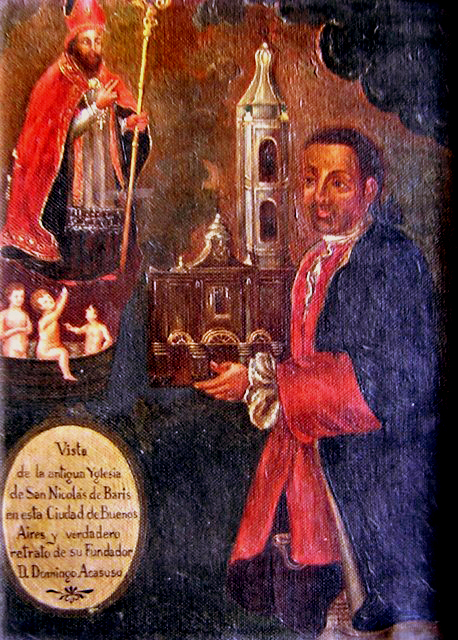
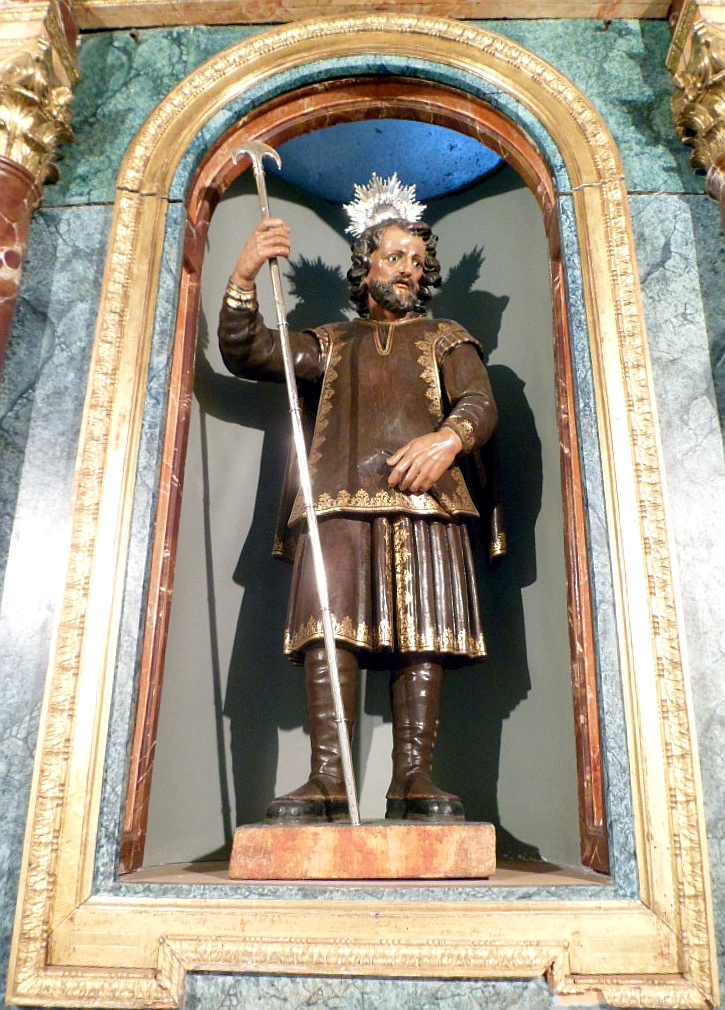
Domingo de Acassuso (left) built the original chapel in honor Isidore the Laborer

On 14 October 1706, the Spanish captain Domingo de Acassuso established a catholic chaplain in honor of Isidore the Laborer (San Isidro Labrador) a Mozarab farmworker who lived in medieval Madrid, known for his piety toward the poor and animals and venerated as a Catholic patron saint of farmers. Acassuso donated a piece of land of 260 m (850 ft) by 5,000 m (16,000 ft) in front of Río de la Plata. The date was set as date of foundation of the city of San Isidro.. A small chapel was inaugurated on that site on 27 May 1708, attended by presbyter Fernando Ruiz Corredor.

The foundation of the chapel would be related to an Acassuso's dream during one of his patrols. In that dream, his father would have asked him to build a chapel so the farmers there could celebrate their holidays and attend mass. Acassuso interpreted that dream as a mandate from San Isidro.

Some 12 years later, the chapel became a sacristy of a bigger church, inaugurated in April 1720. The chapel remained there until 1895, when it was demolished due to its poor condition and possibility of collapse. On 6 October 1895, construction of the new church began, being designed by French architect Charles Paquin and Swiss Jacques Dunant. On May 14, 1898, the first mass was celebrated there. The church was consecrated on 20 October 1906.

On 6 October 1929, the cathedral received a relic of its patron saint, San Isidro, taken from his mummified corpse entombed in Madrid cathedral. This was by dispensation of the Spanish king Alphonso XIII.

The cathedral underwent a restoration project which started in 2002 and was completed in 2009. Back in 2015, one of the cathedral's century-old tower windows broke off and fell onto the atrium below. The Diocese decided to replace the 24 dormers or skylights that adorned the top of the tower, which had remained untouched since 1898, when the church was inaugurated. This project costed approximately AR$ 400,000 at the time.

== Architecture ==
Constructed in neogothic style, it stands 68 metres (223 ft 1 in) tall and is in the conventional form of a Latin cross. Its walls are built from stone and bricks. Most of Cathedral's stained glass windows were made by Mayer & Co. of Munich, J.A. Berges, of Toulouse, and Collet et Pasquie. The church also boasts a French organ built by the firm of Cavaillé-Coll in 1906.

== San Isidro festival ==
The festival of Isidore the Labourer, patron saint of the cathedral, is celebrated on 15 May each year.

== Interesting places nearby the cathedral ==
=== Plaza Mitre ===
Plaza Mitre

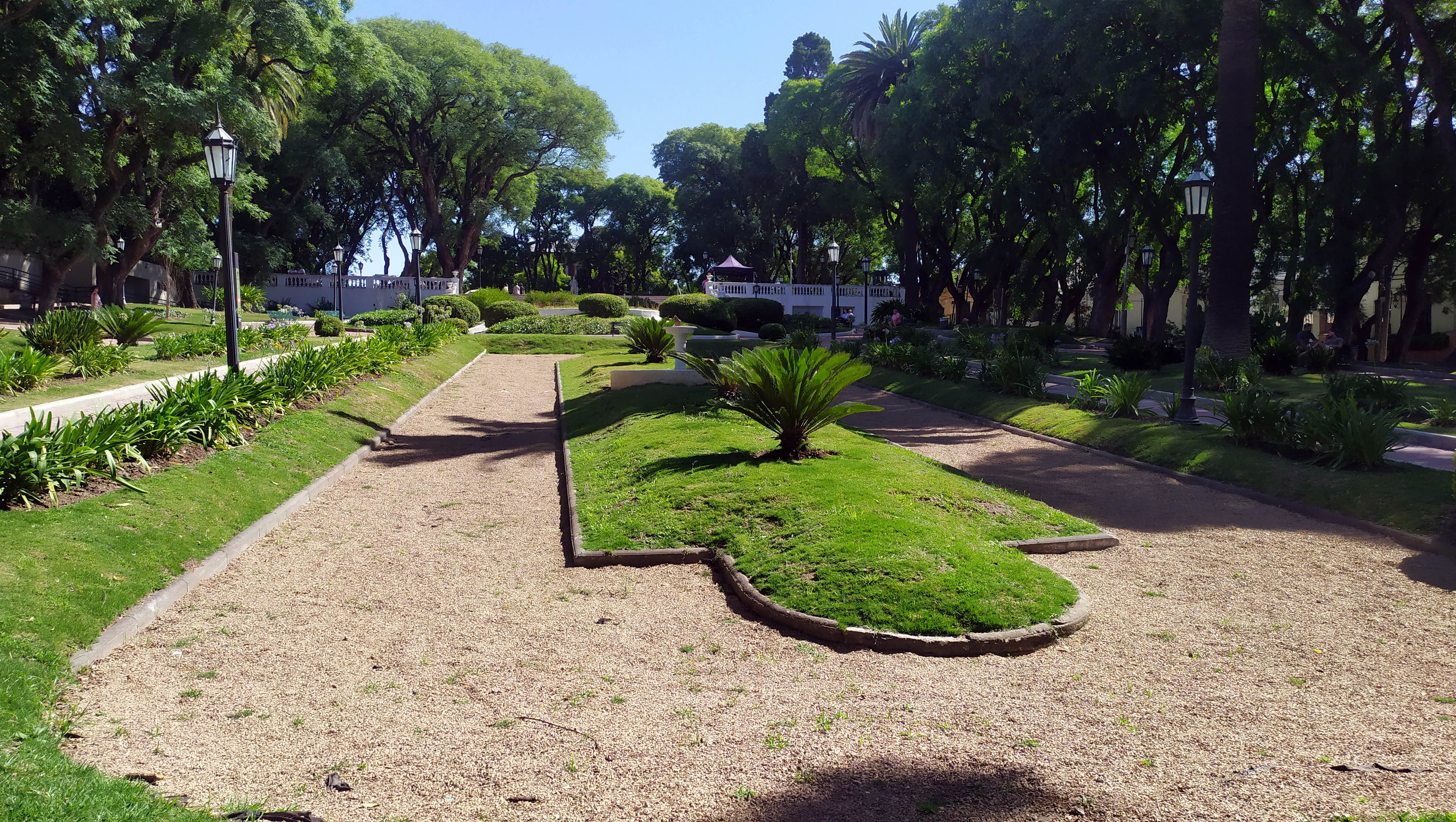
Park path and trees

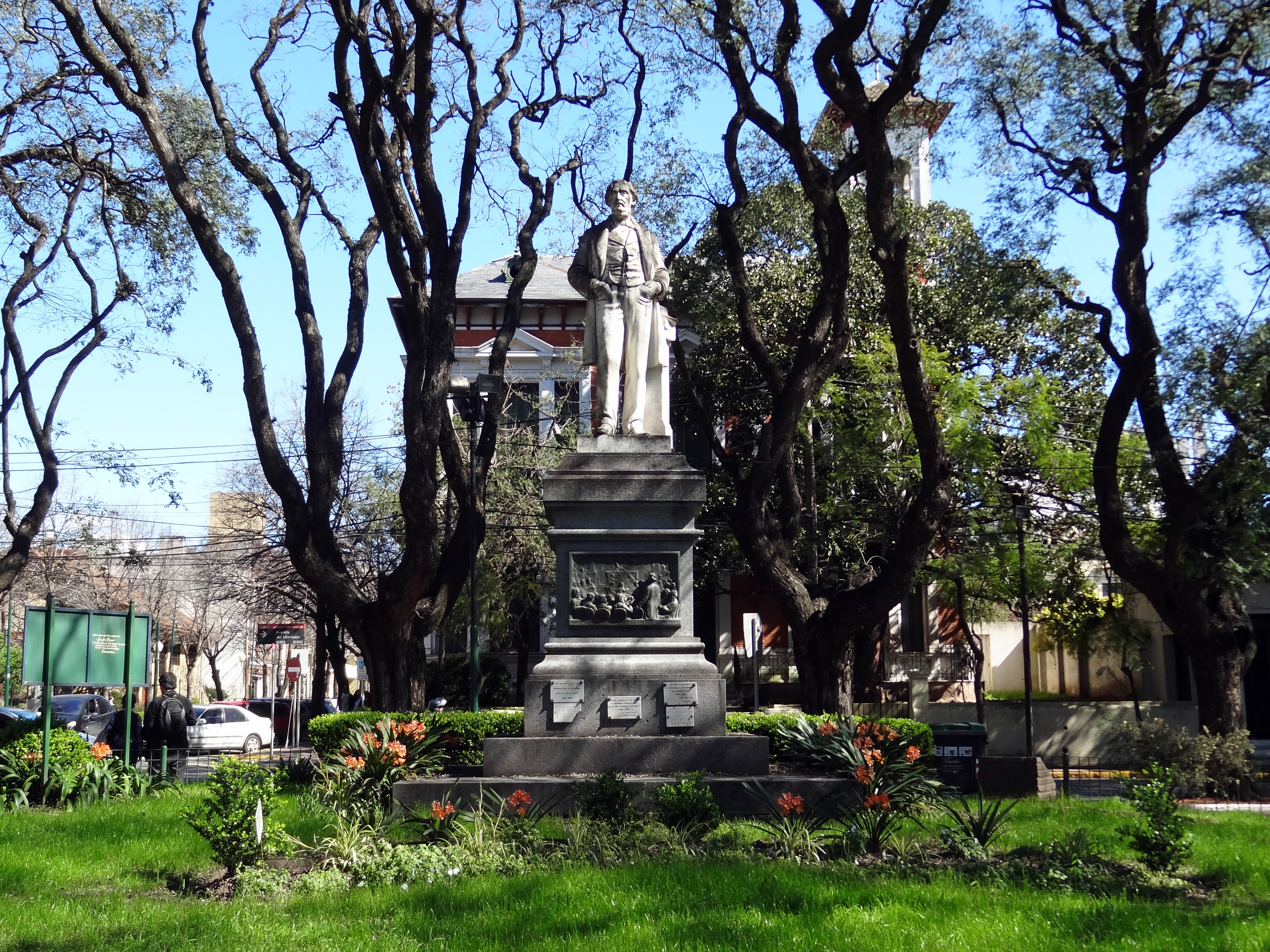
Statue of Bartolomé Mitre

The "Plaza Mitre" (also known as Plaza San Isidro, named after Bartolomé Mitre) is located in front of the cathedral, extending from Del Libertador Avenue to Juan B. de Lasalle street. The Plaza is the epicenter of San Isidro's historic center, situated on two levels atop a natural ravine. Its predominant vegetation consists of tipuana and tilia americana trees planted in 1905.

On the lower level, a floral clock—considered the first in South America—stands out, built by the Swiss watchmaker José de Testorelli and inaugurated on New Year's Day 1914 by Mayor Adrián Beccar Varela. On the upper level, accessed via a grand marble staircase, are the monument to General Bartolomé Mitre, by the Italian-Argentine sculptor José Arduino, inaugurated in 1910, and the "Landmark of Argentinian Identity" No. 2, which commemorates the events that took place during the Reconquest of Buenos Aires in 1806.

=== Artisan fair ===
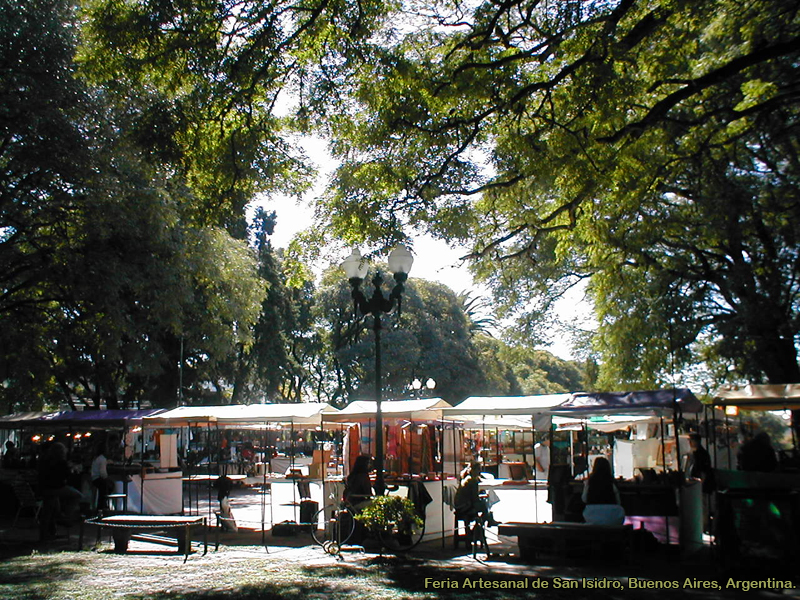
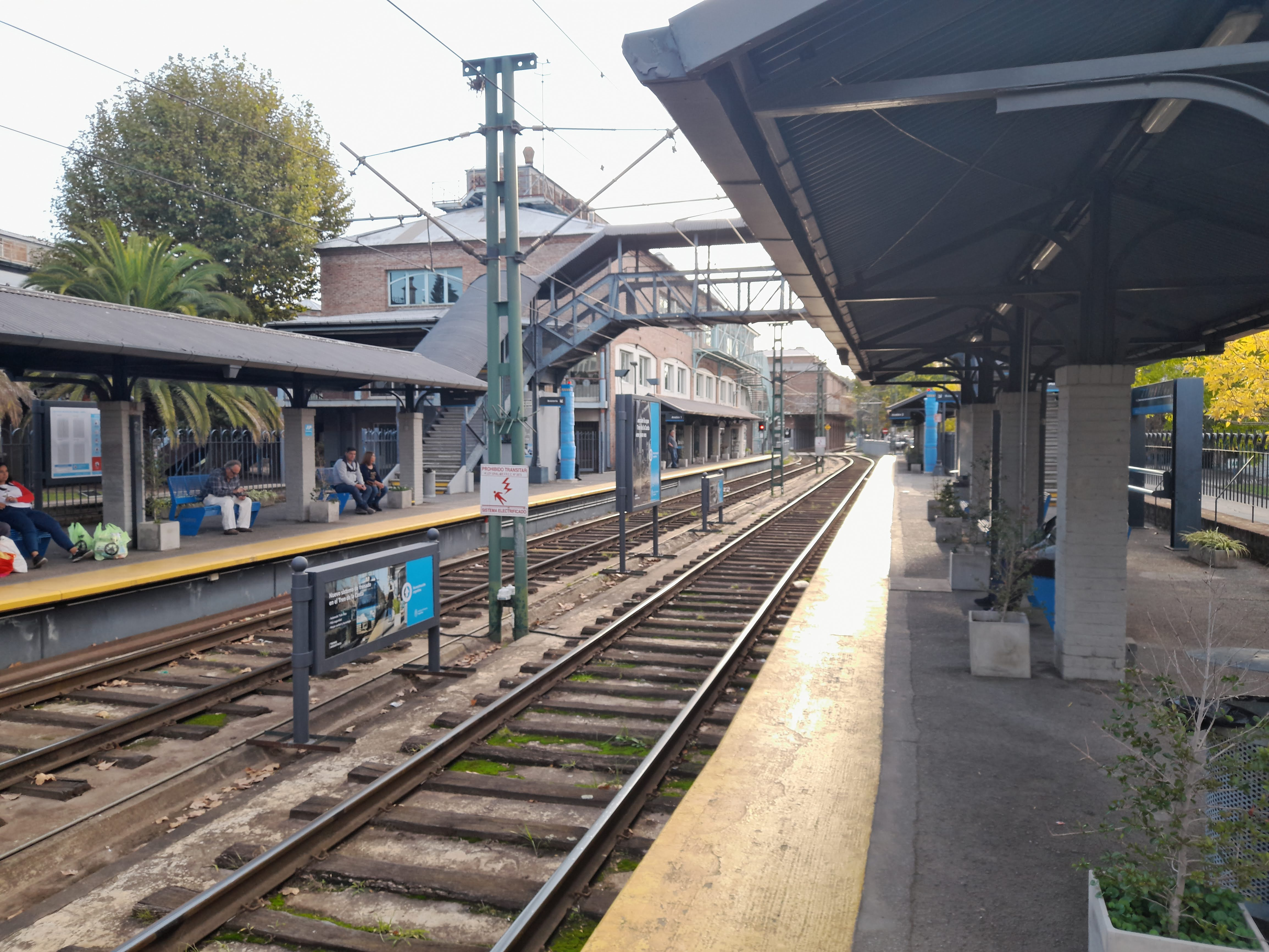
(left): San Isidro artisan fair; (right): San Isidro station of Tren de la Costa

The San Isidro artisan fair has been held since 1971 and its stands are located in front of the cathedral, on Plaza Mitre.

This fair has 100 stands, where people can buy leather, wood, textile, metal and ceramic products. It opens on weekends and holidays. The fair is the oldest in Buenos Aires Province.

=== San Isidro station ===
The San Isidro train station (also known as "San Isidro R" due to it was built by the Buenos Aires and Rosario Railway) is located two hundred metres from the cathedral. The station had been closed in 1961 and was inactive until 1995, when it was completely refurbished by Sociedad Comercial del Plata (SCP), owner of Tren de la Costa that began to operate the line in 1995.

By the time it was reinaugurated, the station had become an open-air shopping center that included clothes stores, cinemas, and restaurants. Nevertheless, the decreasing traffic of passengers and the cancellation of the contract to SCP led the commercial centre to close so most of the station's structure remained abandoned. In 2024, part of the facilities were occupied by the Raúl Sclabrini Ortiz National University (UNSO).

== Gallery ==
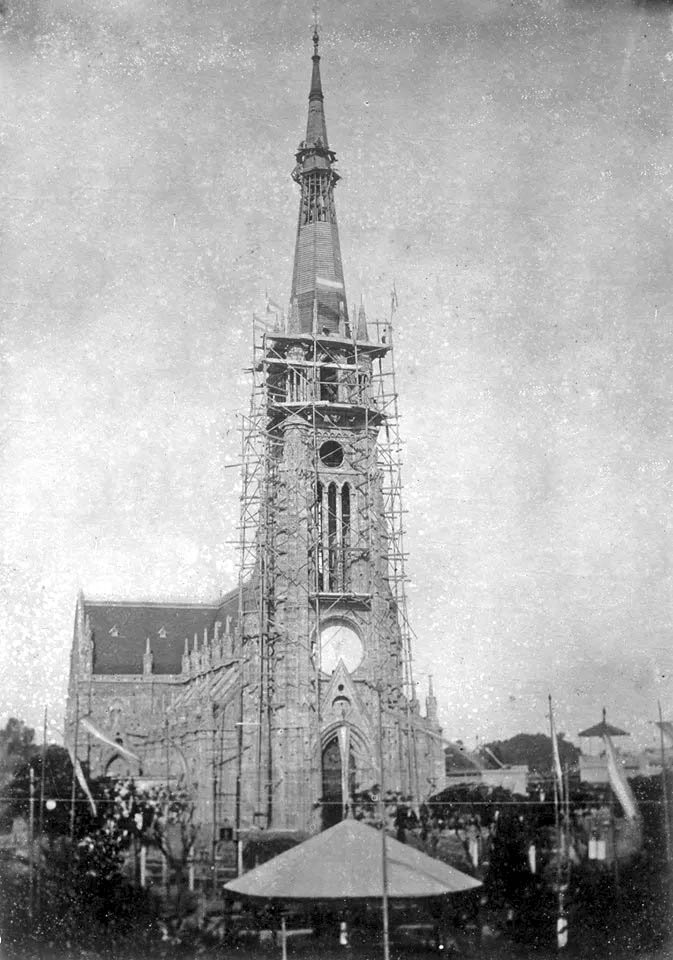
Under construction

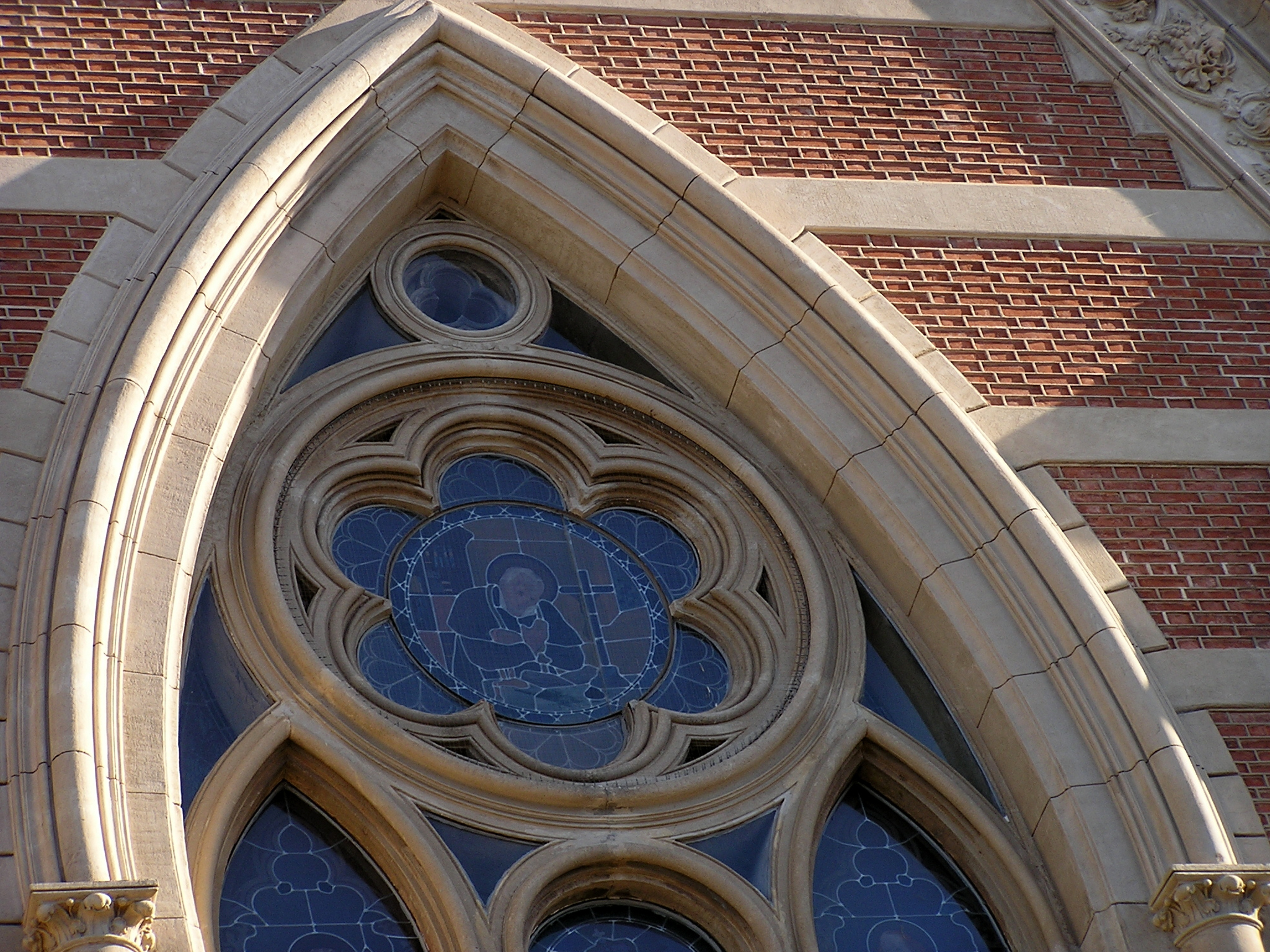
Rosette

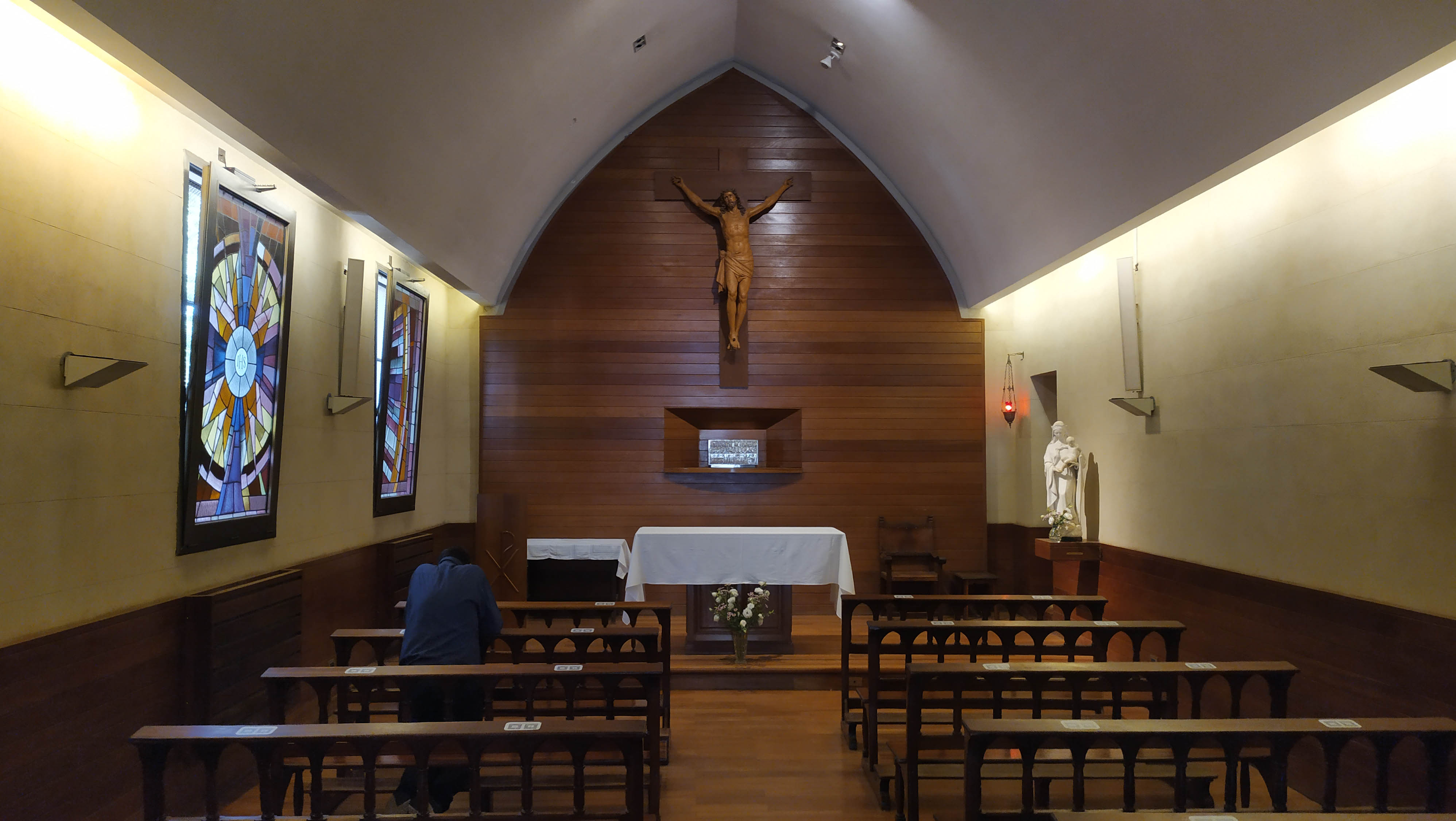
Chapel

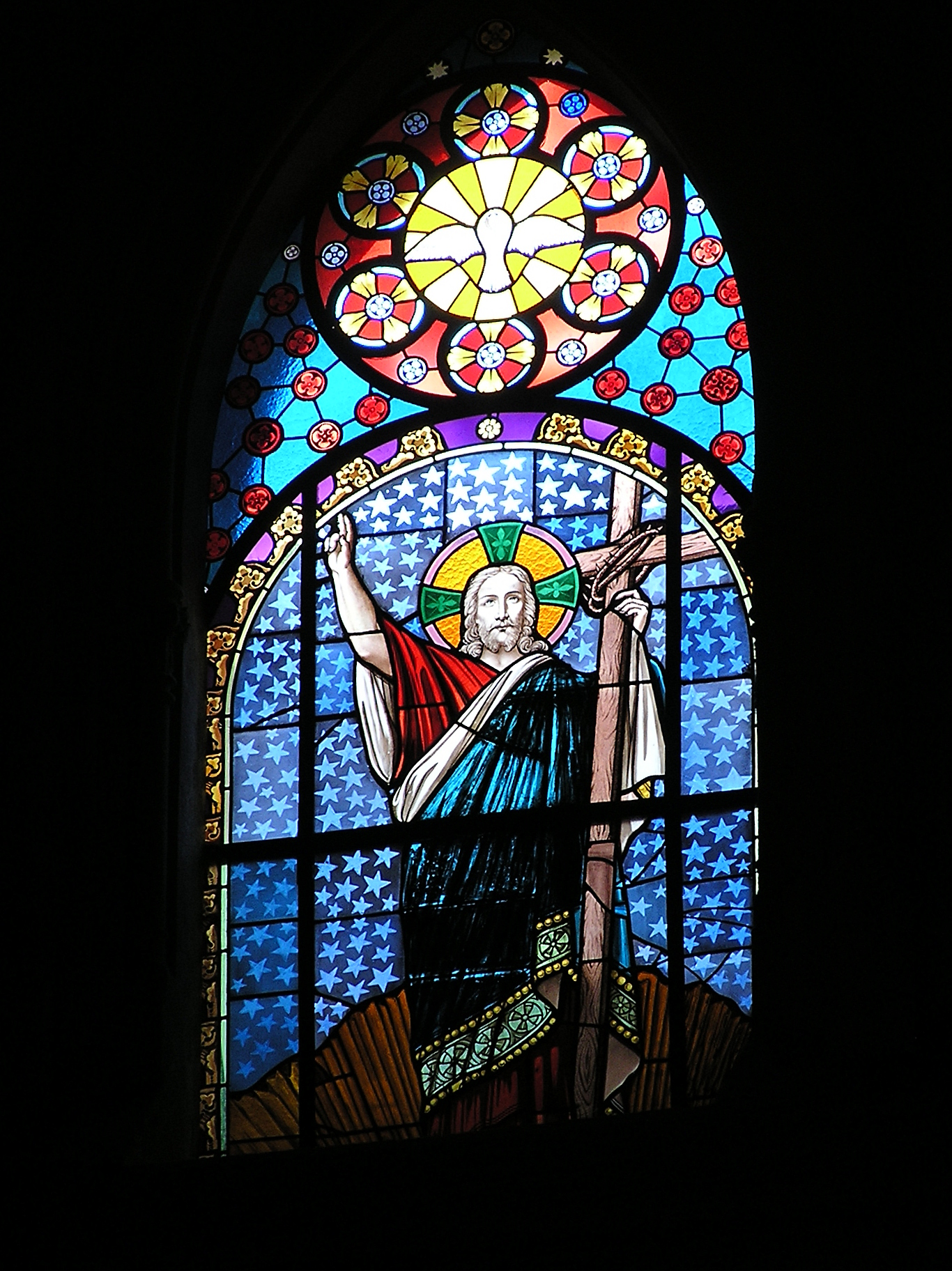
Stained glass

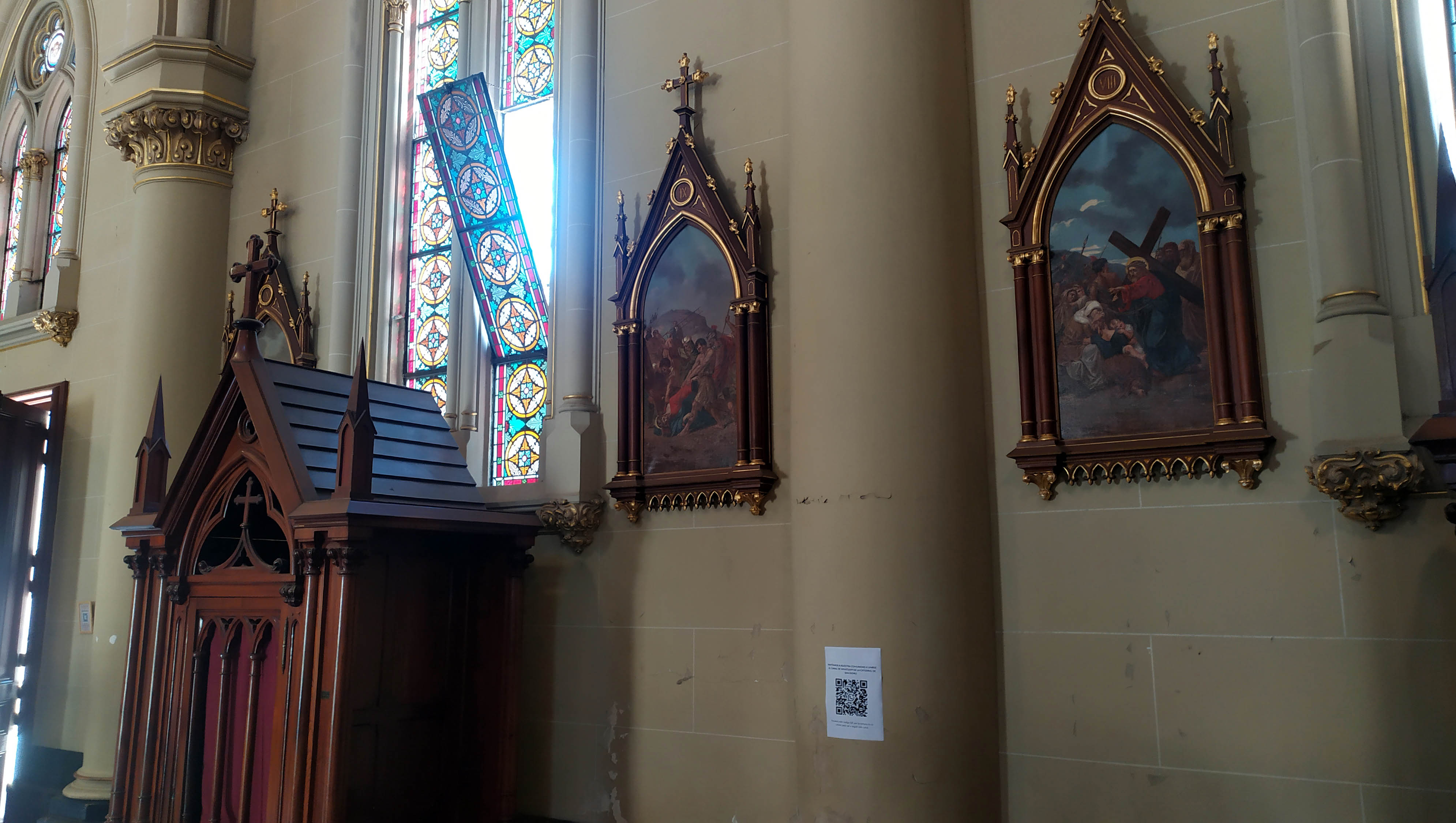
Confessional

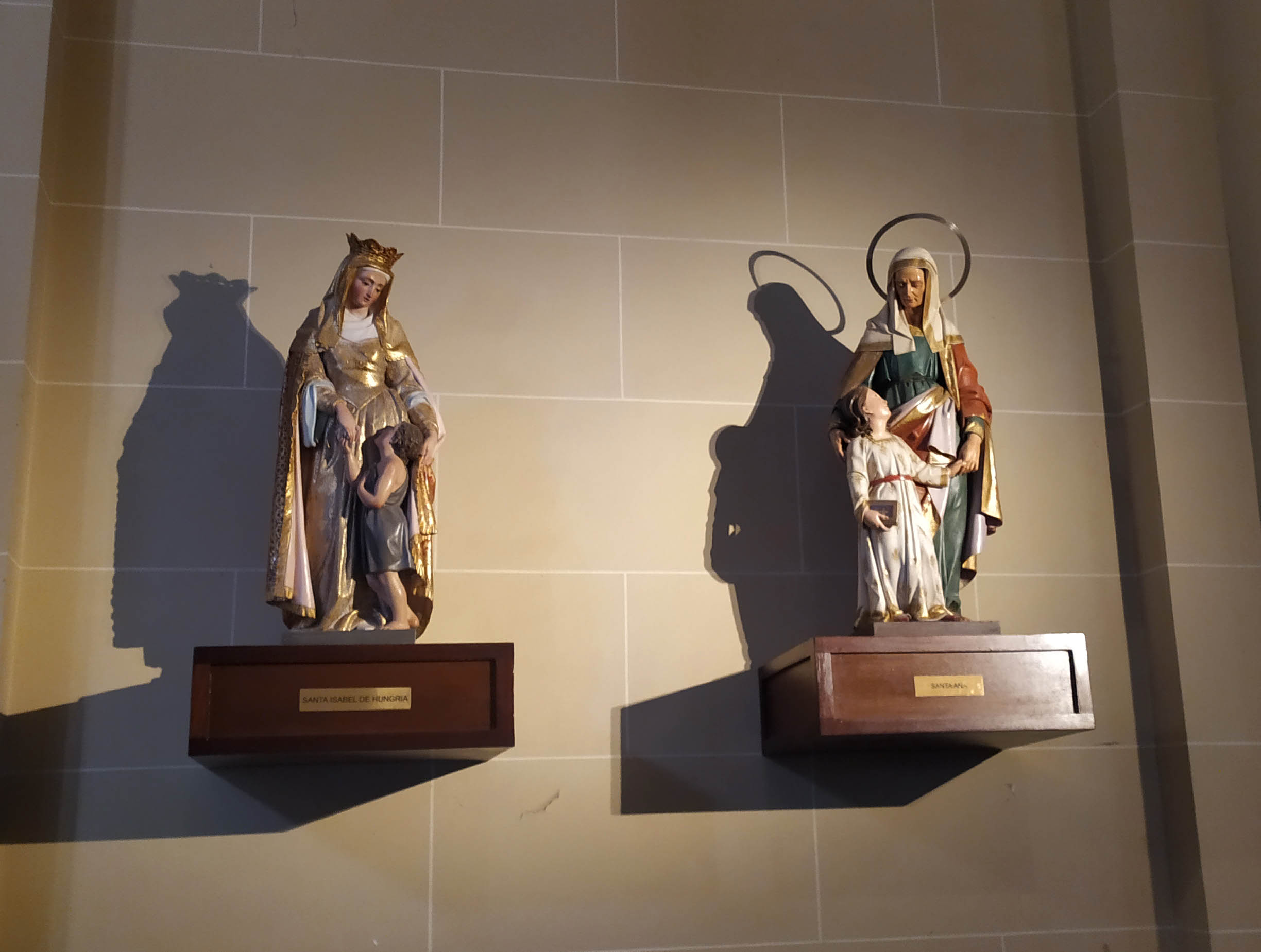
Statues

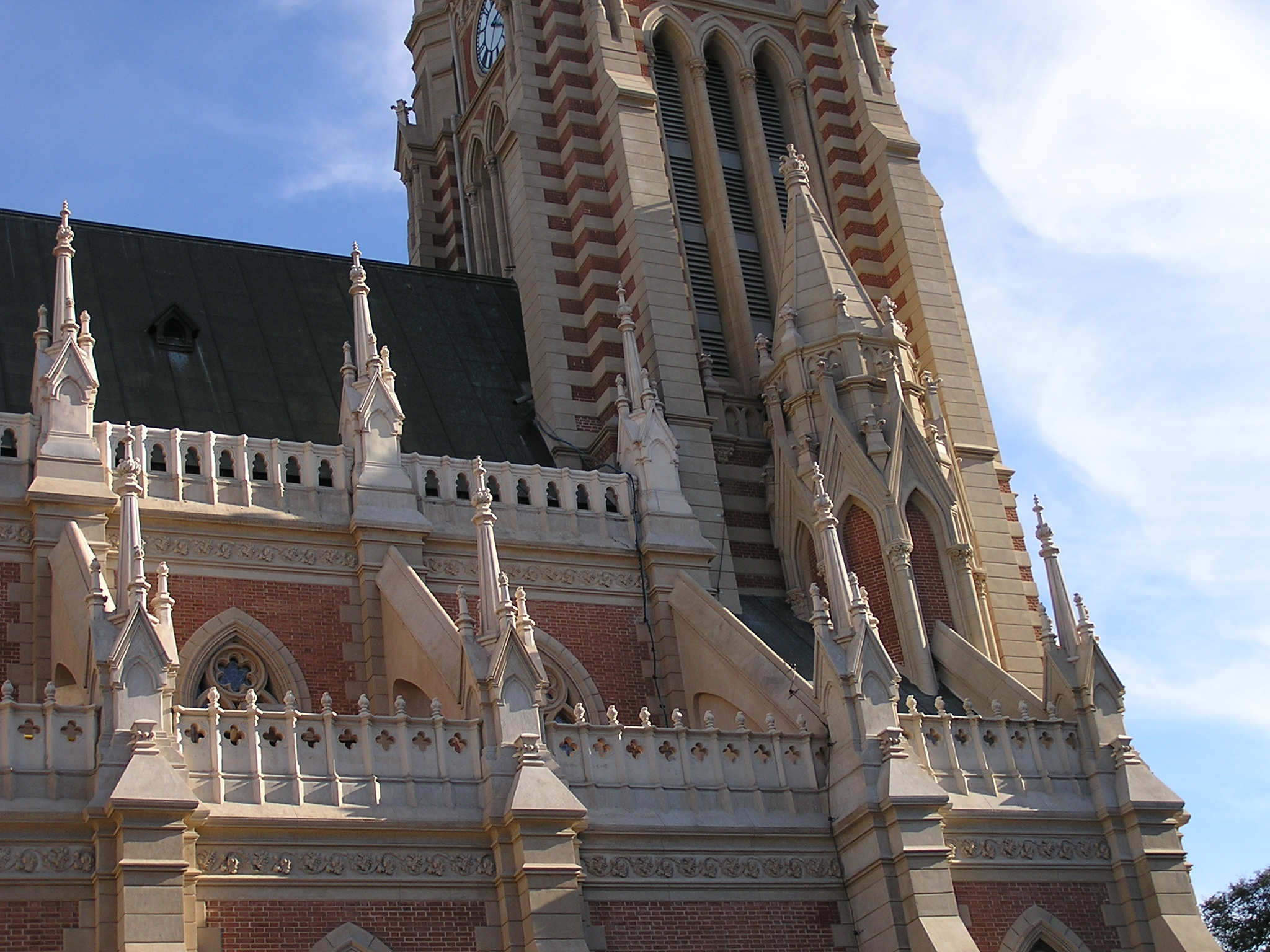
Side view

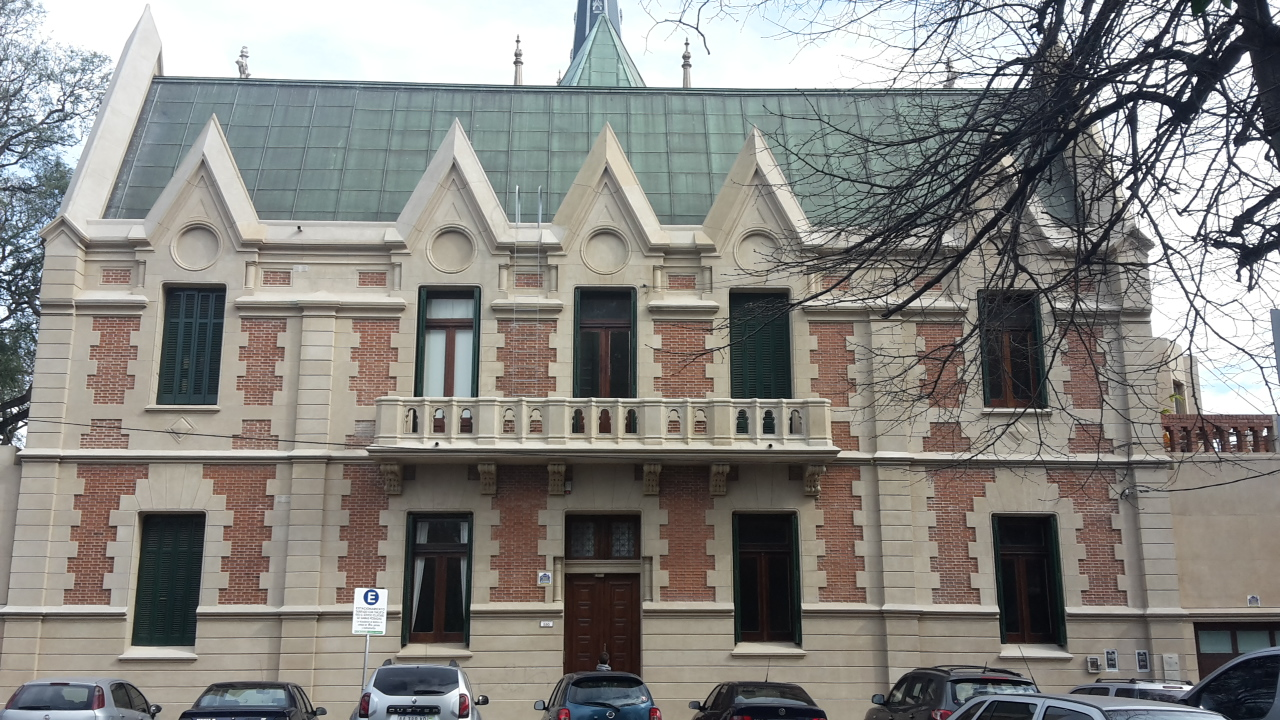
Back

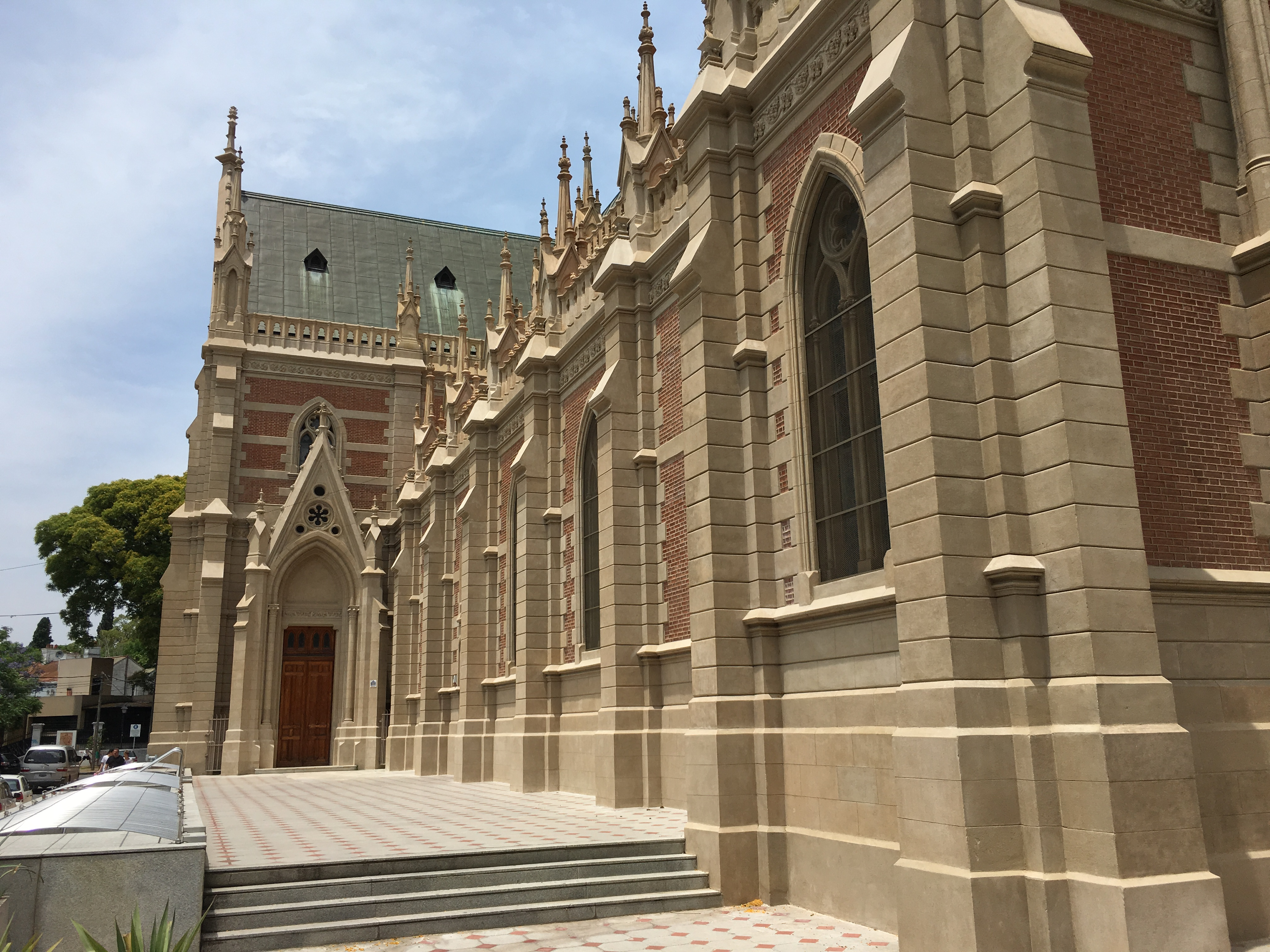
View

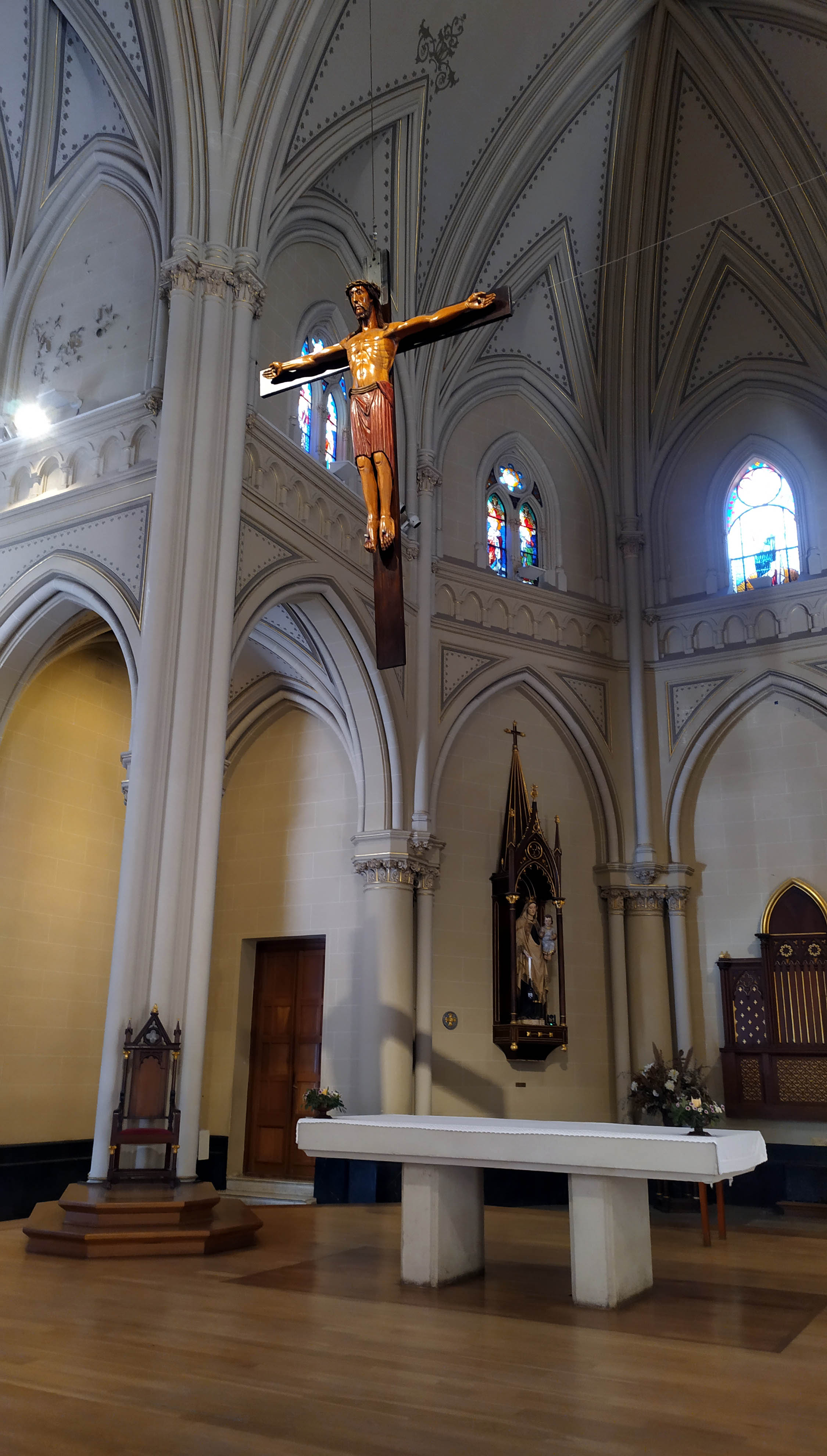
Crucifix, main althar

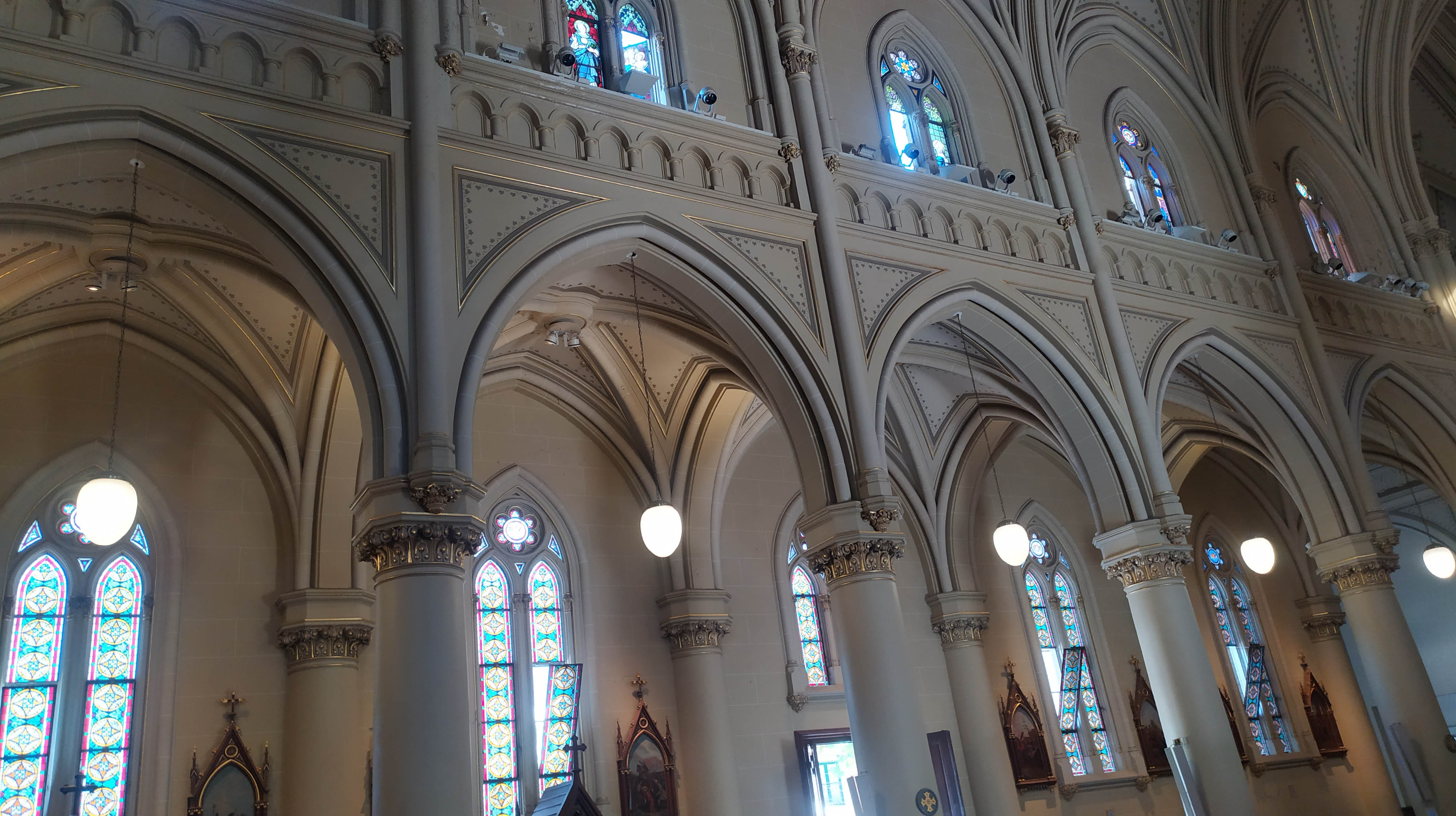
Interior of main nave

== See also ==
- Colegio Nacional de San Isidro
- Tren de la Costa
- San Isidro Partido
