= Pilgrims' College =

Pilgrims’ College – The Little Pilgrims'
- Argentina; Buenos Aires

Information
- Type: Private co-educational school
- Motto: "Spirit, Mind and Body"
- Established: 1982
- Founder: Pablo Cernadas, Isabel Sunblad de Cernadas, Alberto Berro
- Chairman: Jeronimo Cernadas
- Headmaster: Alberto Berro
- Grades: K-12
- Campus: San Isidro and General Pacheco
- Colours: Blue, White & Red
- Affiliations: Roman Catholic
- Website: www.pilgrimscollege.com.ar

Pilgrims’ College, commonly referred as Pilgrims', is a private, co-educational, Catholic school located in the residential neighborhood of San Isidro, Buenos Aires, and blends a rigorous academic curriculum with strong extracurricular activities. The school's headmaster, Alberto Berro, is a board member of the Pontifical Catholic University of Argentina (UCA) and the school is a founding member of the English Speaking Scholastic Association of the River Plate (ESSARP), International Baccalaureate Organization (IBO), currently offering the International General Certificate of Secondary Education (IGCSE) and A-Levels. The School also offers international exams such as BEC, FCE, and PET.

== Location ==
Both campuses are located in the North section of Greater Buenos Aires Metropolitan area in San Isidro and Pacheco neighborhoods.

== History ==
By the late 1970s Pablo Cernadas and his wife Isabel Sunblad de Cernadas together with Alberto Berro addressed the problem of many upper class Argentinians who were unhappy with the few secondary schools for boys in the Northern area of Buenos Aires that were both Catholic and bilingual. In 1982 the Pilgrims' College was founded as a primary school for boys in the exclusive suburb of La Horqueta. The school grew rapidly and in 1987 the first class of Bilingual Bachelors graduated from high school.

In 1988 Miss Beatriz Mottet's kindergarten was incorporated into the Pilgrims' family, now offering a full K–12 education.

By 2001 the request of many families and former students together with the increasingly growing area of Pacheco in Tigre resulted in a second campus being founded and the Board deciding to incorporate girls into the traditional all-boys school. The Co-educational system is chosen and since 2004 girls have also welcomed into San Isidro.

== The School ==
The school name, "College of the Pilgrims", symbolizes our status of men walking to the house of the Father.

The Pilgrims' College originating as a school for boys aims to provide a bilingual, Catholic education, It teaches English to the youngest students, not through English lessons but by teaching the majority of the curriculum in English.

Until 2004 the Pilgrims' College was exclusively an all-boys school but, with the opening of its new campus in Pacheco, girls were welcomed to join and the first class of girls graduated from Pacheco's school in 2012 and from San Isidro in 2015.

The school has subscribed to important agreements with San Andres University, UCEMA, Pontifical Catholic University of Argentina, ITBA and Austral University.

== Sports ==
The school has many traditions within its four houses: Oxford, Cambridge, Eton and Harrow. All the activities are coordinated by the school Head Boy and Head Girl. In addition each house has a Senior House Captain and a Senior Games Captain (some Houses choose to elect more than one). House prefects were once elected from the senior year, but this no longer happens and 6th form students are now chosen. The Head Boy and Head Girl are in charge of making announcements, and sometimes provide light entertainment. Many inter-house competitions occur, mostly in the field of sport.

The sports term has a different calendar from the three academic terms as it is divided into the Autumn and Spring semesters. Each of them promotes different activities. The Autumn Semester focuses mainly on rugby for boys, hockey for girls and volleyball for both. During the Spring term football and athletics are trained.

The school also participates in many inter-school tournaments with other British tradition schools.

== Notable alumni ==
- Gonzalo Tiesi, Puma rugby player
