= Videla =

Videla is a surname of Spanish origin and may refer to:

- Jorge Rafael Videla (1925–2013), dictator of Argentina from 1976 to 1981
- Gabriel González Videla (1898–1980), President of Chile from 1946 to 1952
- Mario Videla (born 1962), Argentine footballer
- Chantal Videla (born 2002), Filipino-Argentine actress and member of K-pop girl group Lapillus

== See also ==
- Chilean destroyer Videla, a Serrano class destroyer in the Chilean Navy
- Videl, character in Dragon Ball media
- Videle, town in Romania
- Videlles, village in France
- González Videla Antarctic Base
