= San Isidro, Buenos Aires =

San Isidro
- City

- Location in Greater Buenos Aires
- Coordinates: 34°28′26″S 58°31′30″W
- Country: Argentina
- Province: Buenos Aires
- Partido: San Isidro
- Established: 1784
- Elevation: 15 m (49 ft)

Population (2001 census [INDEC])
  - Total: 45,190
- CPA Base: B 1642
- Area code: +54 11

San Isidro is a city in Greater Buenos Aires. It is located 27.9 km from the Autonomous City of Buenos Aires (CABA). It ranks as the province's most affluent neighborhood.

== History ==
In 2007, San Isidro celebrated its 300 years of existence with different celebrations taking place in the Hippodrome and in other venues. The settlement was first incorporated in 1784 as the Alcaldía de la Hermandad and was granted municipality status by the province in 1850. It maintains sister city relationships with Herzliya, Israel; Nagoya, Japan; and San Isidro, Peru.

== Geography ==
The center of San Isidro is a historic area with cobbled streets and old single-story houses. At the heart of Plaza Mitre is the neo-Gothic San Isidro Cathedral built in 1898. The sloping plaza, home to the recently opened Rugby Museum, hosts an antiques and crafts fair. The plaza leads down to the Río de la Plata, where the riverside park is popular with mate drinkers and tourists. The city is also known as the "National Capital of Rugby" being the cradle of many important players and hosting the national rugby union's derby match between CASI and SIC.

San Isidro is served by two rail lines, the Mitre Line and the Tren de la Costa (Train of the Coast). The latter station is a vintage 1891 building designed in the style of British stations. The facility also houses a shopping arcade, a cinema complex and restaurants. The station is located just 200 meters from the San Isidro Cathedral.

Many large houses surround the historic center and line the riverside. The oldest is the House of General Pueyrredón, built in 1790 by Juan Martín de Pueyrredón and expanded by his son Prilidiano Pueyrredón. The house, with its old giant algarrobo tree under which Pueyrredón and San Martín discussed independence, is a national historic monument and hosts the municipal historic museum of San Isidro. The home of writer Victoria Ocampo, the Villa Ocampo, is owned by UNESCO and is open to the public.

The San Isidro Hippodrome is one of Argentina's most important race courses and covers a large part of the area inland from the city. Built in the striking 1930s architectural style, the race track has faced tough times since the economic crises of the late 20th and early 21st centuries.

== Education ==
- Pilgrims' College

== Notable people ==
- Francisco Javier Muñiz, physician and naturalist
- Puccio family, including Arquímedes Rafael Puccio, convicted murderer and kidnapper
- Ronald Scott, Fleet Air Arm pilot during the Second World War.
- Gino Trappa, racing driver

== Gallery ==
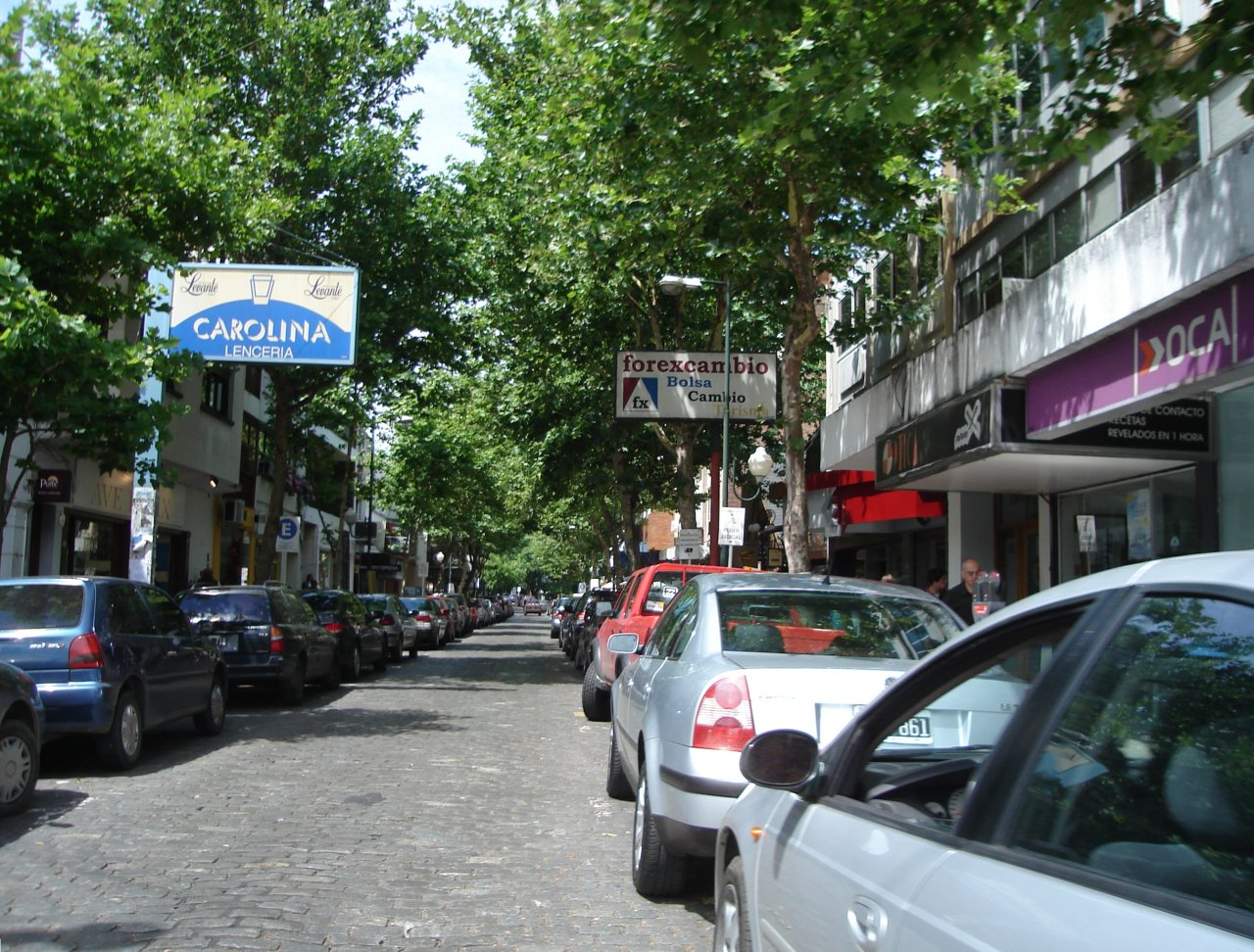
9 July Street, San Isidro

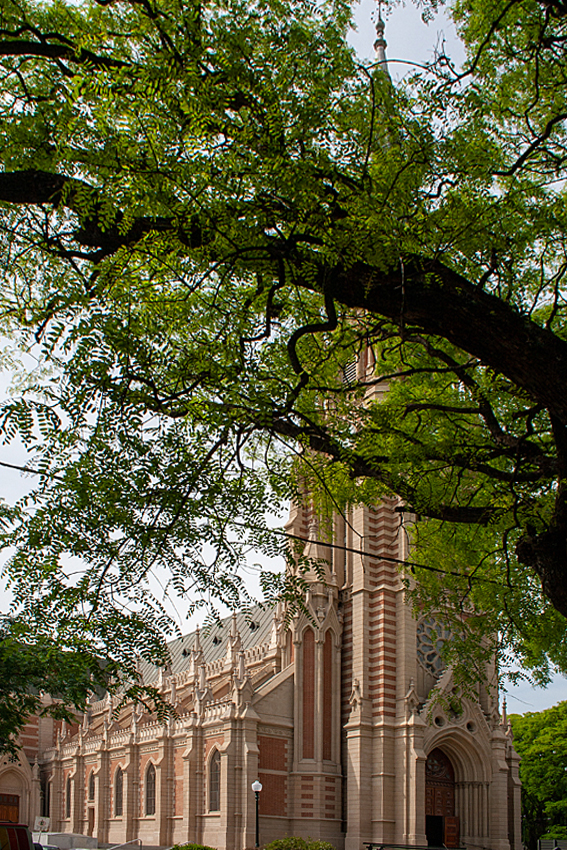
Cathedral of San Isidro

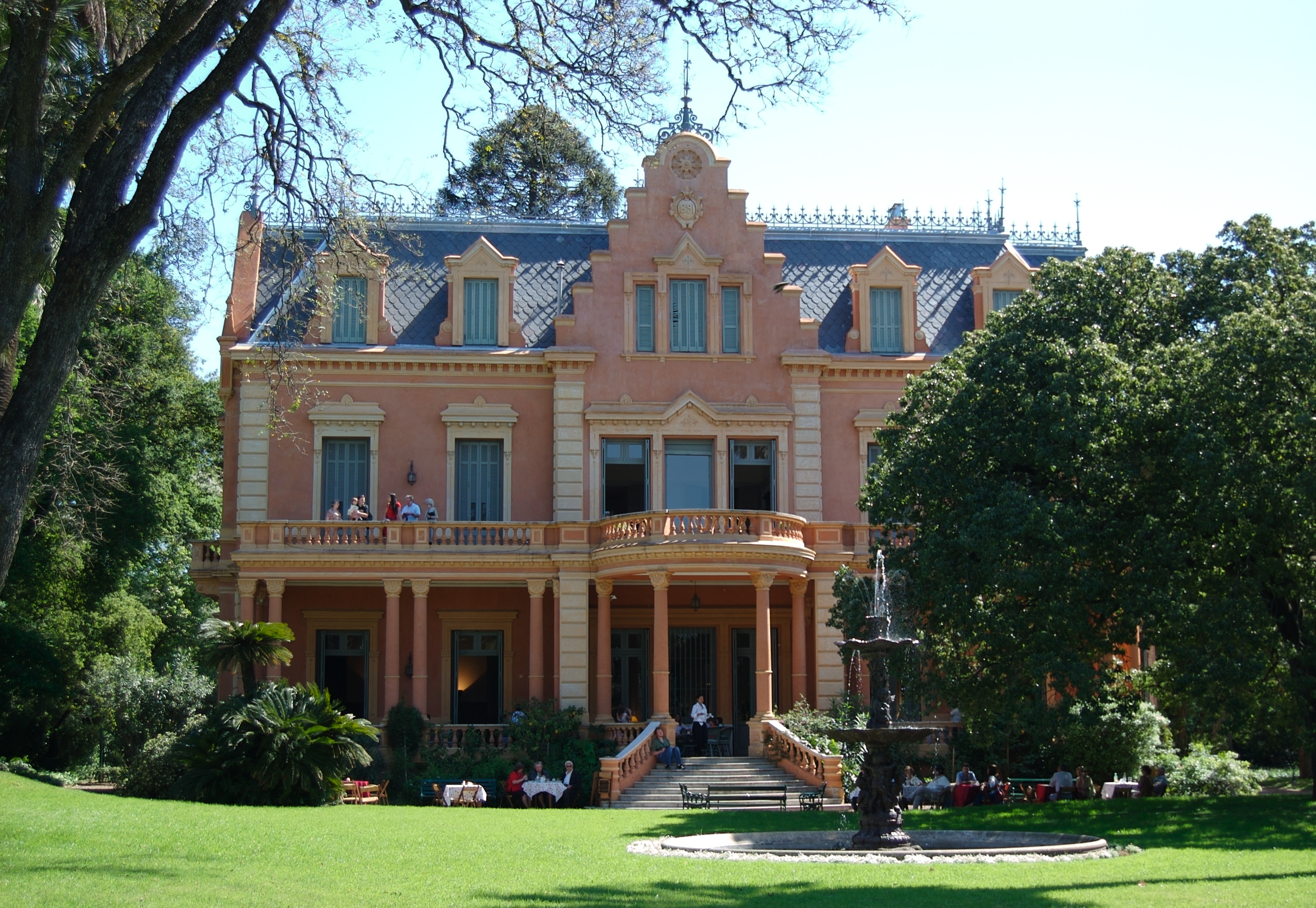
Villa Ocampo, erstwhile home of critic and publisher Victoria Ocampo

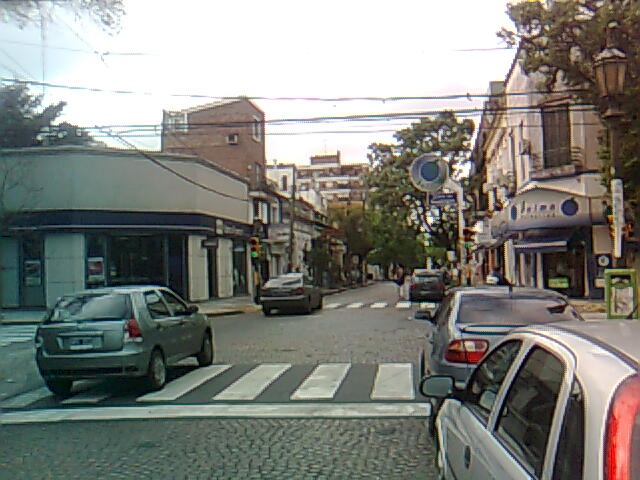
25 May Street

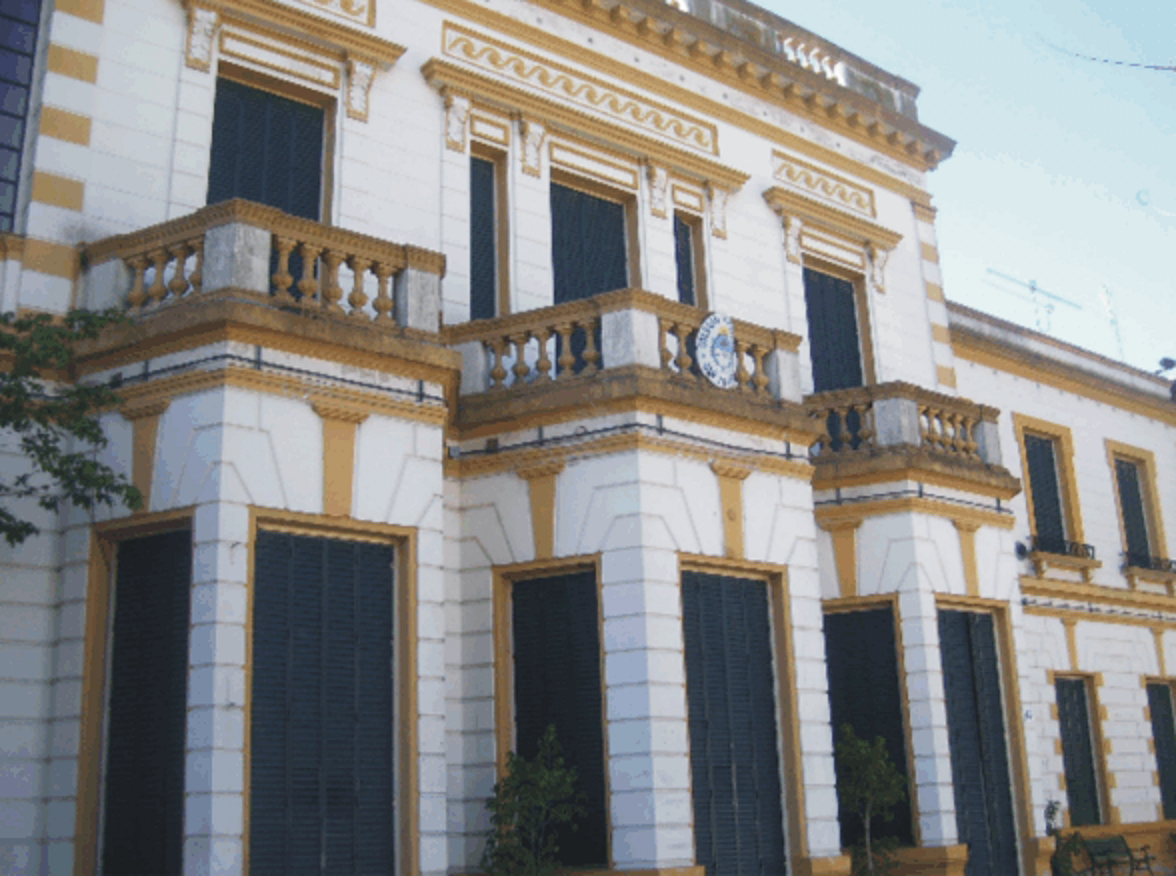
The San Isidro National Secondary School

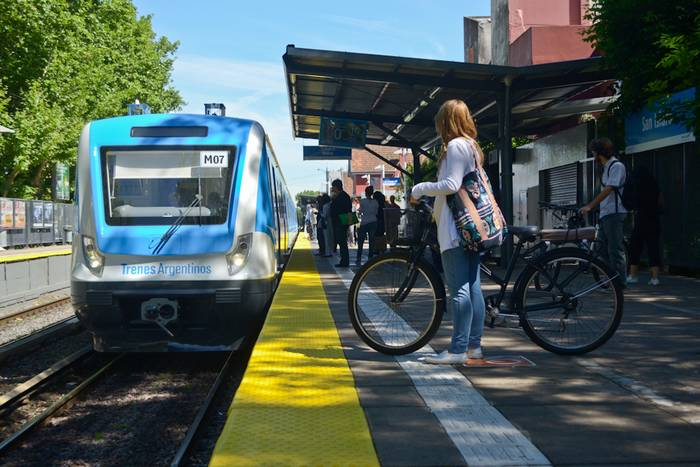
Mitre Line, San Isidro station (not to be confused with the San Isidro R station)

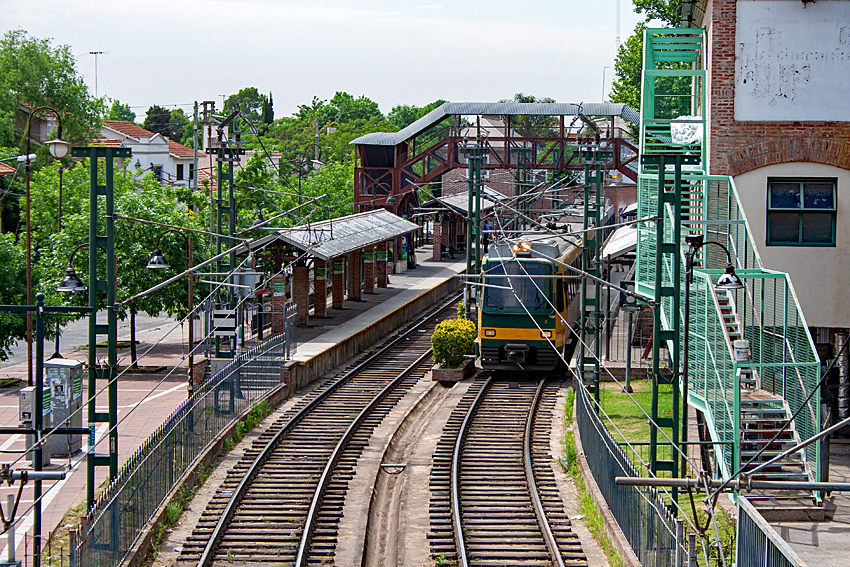
Tren de la Costa San Isidro R station

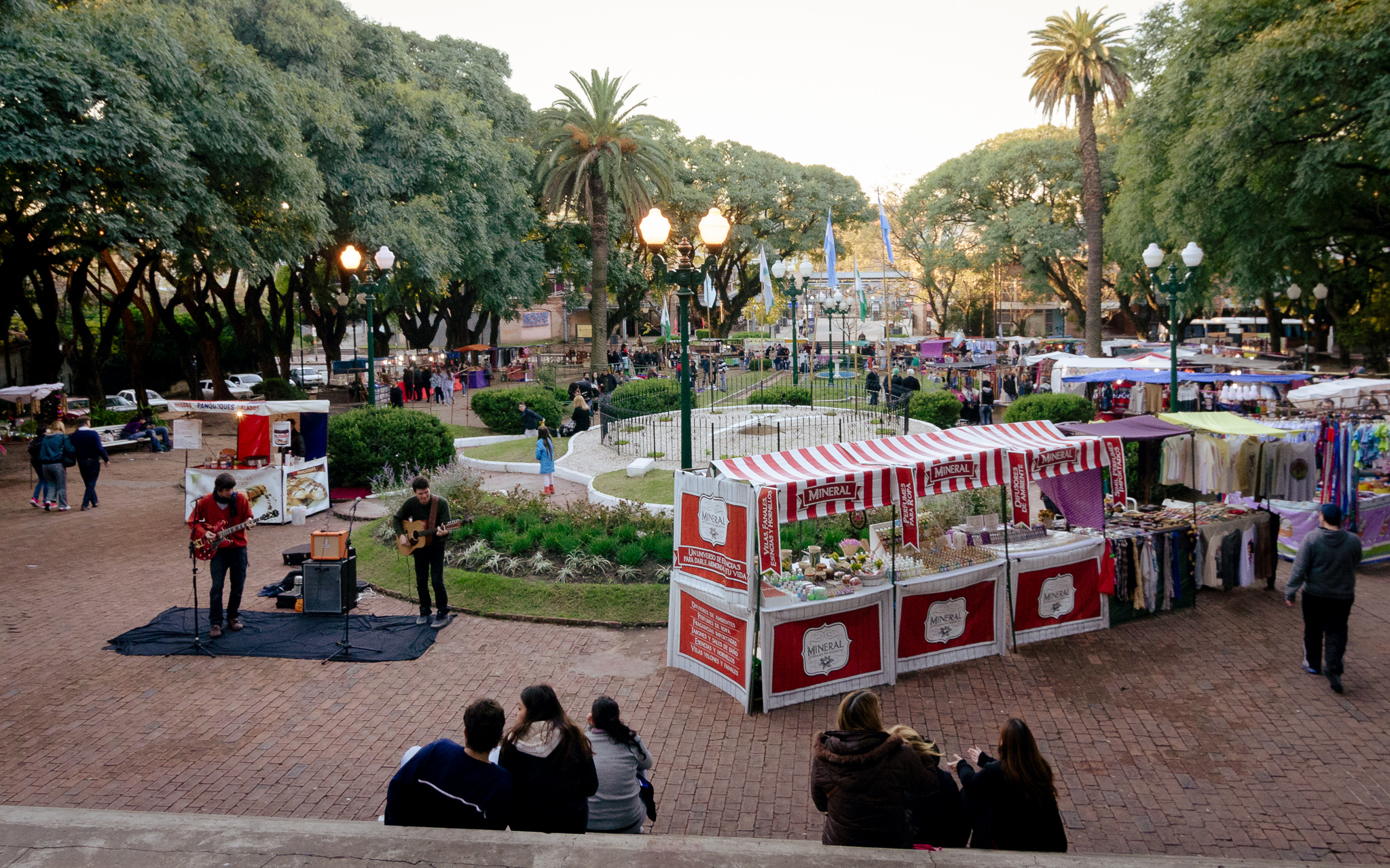
Art fair, San Isidro
