= Marcelo Loffreda =

Argentine rugby union player (born 1959)

- Born: May 17, 1959 (age 67) Buenos Aires, Argentina

Rugby union career
- Position: Centre
Senior career
Years	Team	Apps	(Points)
1979-1994	San Isidro Club		
International career
Years	Team	Apps	(Points)
1978-1994	Argentina	50	(57)
Coaching career
- Years: Team
- 1995-2000: San Isidro Club
- 2000-2007: Argentina
- 2007-2008: Leicester Tigers

Marcelo Loffreda (born May 17, 1959, in Buenos Aires, Argentina) is an Argentine former rugby union footballer and coach. Loffreda won 44 caps with one as captain, playing at centre for the Argentine rugby union side (los Pumas). He played much of his career outside the legendary Hugo Porta and scored 4 test tries.

In 1994 he hung up his playing boots and became a coach. In April 2000, he was appointed coach of Argentina and steered them to series victories over France, Wales and Scotland, a draw with the British and Irish Lions, a win against England at Twickenham in November 2006 as well as coming close to securing the Pumas' first victories over South Africa and New Zealand. The Pumas went on to their all-time best finish of third at the 2007 World Cup, including an opening win over hosts France, a pool win over Ireland, and another win over France in the third-place match. This success was Loffreda's swansong as Pumas coach, as he had announced months before the tournament that he would leave the Pumas after the World Cup for the job of director of rugby at Leicester.

Loffreda graduated in civil engineering at Universidad de Buenos Aires and was sales manager for Argentine textile and footwear company Alpargatas.

He is married with five children: Sophia, Nicolas, Juana, Olivia and Marina (in age order)

Loffreda was sacked from his job as head coach at Leicester on June 6, 2008, after just one season at the club. Despite reaching two finals (EDF energy and Guinness Premiership) he was dismissed due to poor results. Leicester only just reached the Premiership playoffs and barely qualified for the Heineken Cup; from a club of such a high standard, this was seen as unacceptable. He was succeeded as Leicester Tigers coach by then 40-year-old South African, Heyneke Meyer in late June 2008.

He has returned to Argentina as a coach.

== Honours ==
- Rugby World Cup
  - Third place: 2007
- PARA Pan American Championship
  - Champions: 2001, 2003
- South American Rugby Championship
  - Champions: 2002, 2003, 2004, 2006
