= 2014 South American Rugby Championship "B" =

15° Campeonato Sudamericano de Rugby B
- Date: 31 August – 6 September 2014
- Countries: Colombia; Ecuador; Peru; Venezuela

Tournament statistics
- Matches played: 6

The 2014 South American Rugby Championship B division tournament was held at the Estadio Santiago Rambay in Apartadó, Colombia over three match days during August and September 2014. The South American Rugby Championship was organized by the Confederación Sudamericana de Rugby (CONSUR).

== Teams ==
- Colombia, Venezuela, and Peru all participated in the 2013 South American Rugby Championship B.
- Ecuador was promoted by winning the 2013 South American Rugby Championship C.
- After round 2, the top two teams competed for a place in the CONSUR A playoffs against Chile.

== Table ==
Promotion playoff vs last place in 2014 CONSUR A
Relegation playoff vs CONSUR C 2014 champion

Place	Nation	Games				Points			Table points
Place	Nation	Played	Won	Drawn	Lost	For	Against	Diff	Table points
1	Colombia (60)	3	3	0	0	195	16	+179	9
2	Venezuela (65)	3	2	0	1	111	58	+53	6
3	Peru (72)	3	1	0	2	58	106	–48	3
4	Ecuador (NR)	3	0	0	3	20	204	–184	0

Number in brackets indicates the team's pre-tournament IRB ranking.

== Matches ==
=== Round 1 ===
31 August 2014
08:30 (UTC-04)

Peru	28–33	Venezuela
	Report

Estadio Santiago Rambay Apartadó
Referee: Victor Silvero (Paraguay)

31 August 2014
16:00 (UTC-04)

Colombia	112–0	Ecuador
	Report

Estadio Santiago Rambay Apartadó
Referee: Jean Paul Casanova (Chile)

=== Round 2 ===
3 September 2014
08:30 (UTC-04)

Venezuela	68–3	Ecuador
	Report

Estadio Santiago Rambay Apartadó
Referee: Gustavo Patiño (Costa Rica)

3 September 2014
15:00 (UTC-04)

Colombia	56–6	Peru
	Report

Estadio Santiago Rambay Apartadó
Referee: Federico Fioravanti (Argentina)

=== Round 3 ===
6 September 2014
09:00 (UTC-04)

Ecuador	17–24	Peru
	Report

Estadio Santiago Rambay Apartadó
Referee: Hector Serna (Colombia)

6 September 2014
16:00 (UTC-04)

Colombia	27–10	Venezuela
	Report

Estadio Santiago Rambay Apartadó
Referee: Federico Fioranvanti (Argentina)

== See also ==
- South American Rugby Championship
- CONSUR B
