= 2005 South American Rugby Championship "B" =

6° Campeonato Sudamericano de Rugby B
Tournament details
- Host: Paraguay
- Date: 23 September– 2 October 2005
- Countries: Brazil; Colombia; Peru; Paraguay; Venezuela

Final positions
- Champions: Paraguay
- Runner-up: Brazil

Tournament statistics
- Matches played: 10

The 2005 South American Rugby Championship "B" was the sixth edition of the competition of the second level national rugby union teams in South America.

The tournament was played in Asunción, on the grounds of the Club Universitario de Rugby de Asunción (CURDA), called "Julio Alvarodo", with five teams participating.

Paraguay won the tournament.

== Standings ==
Three points for a victory, two for a draw, and one for a loss

Team	Played	Won	Drawn	Lost	For	Against	Difference	Pts
Paraguay	4	4	0	0	289	26	+ 263	12
Brazil	4	3	0	1	130	71	+ 59	10
Peru	4	2	0	2	54	141	87	8
Colombia	4	1	0	3	48	170	122	6
Venezuela	4	0	0	4	45	158	113	4

== Results ==
- First round

23 September 2005

Brazil	38 - 14	Peru

Julio Alvarado, Asunción

23 September 2005

Paraguay	82 - 8	Colombia

Julio Alvarado, Asunción

- Second round

25 September 2005

Brazil	20 - 12	Venezuela

Julio Alvarado, Asunción

25 September 2005

Paraguay	70 - 3	Peru

Julio Alvarado, Asunción

- Third round

28 September 2005

Peru	17 - 16	Colombia

Julio Alvarado, Asunción

28 September 2005

Paraguay	92 - 7	Venezuela

Julio Alvarado, Asunción

- Fourth round

30 September 2005

Peru	20 - 19	Venezuela

Julio Alvarado, Asunción

30 September 2005

Brazil	64 - 0	Colombia

Julio Alvarado, Asunción

- Fifth round

2 October 2005

Paraguay	45 - 8	Brazil

Julio Alvarado, Asunción

2 October 2005

Colombia	24 - 7	Venezuela

Julio Alvarado, Asunción
