= 2007 South American Rugby Championship "B" =

8° Campeonato Sudamericano de Rugby B
Tournament details
- Host: Peru
- Date: 4–10 November 2007
- Countries: Brazil; Colombia; Peru; Venezuela

Final positions
- Champions: Brazil
- Runner-up: Peru

Tournament statistics
- Matches played: 6

The 2007 South American Rugby Championship "B" was the eighth edition of the competition of the second level national rugby union teams in South America.

The tournament was played in Caracas.

Brazil won the tournament.

Division B consisted of four teams and was played in Peru. Two points were awarded for a win and one for a draw.

Standings

Team	Played	Won	Drawn	Lost	For	Ag.	Diff.	Pts
Brazil	3	3	0	0	116	25	+91	6
Peru	3	2	0	1	51	41	+10	4
Colombia	3	1	0	2	45	68	-23	2
Venezuela	3	0	0	3	28	106	-78	0

4 November 2007

Brazil	24 - 12	Peru

Lima

4 November 2007

Colombia	33 - 13	Venezuela

Lima

7 November 2007

Brazil	49 - 7	Venezuela

Lima

7 November 2007

Peru	13 - 9	Colombia

Lima

10 November 2007

Brazil	43 - 3	Colombia

Lima

10 November 2007

Peru	24 - 8	Venezuela

Lima

== See also ==
- South American Rugby Championship
- CONSUR
