= 2009 South American Rugby Championship "B" =

Rugby Union championship

10° Campeonato Sudamericano de Rugby B
Tournament details
- Host: Costa Rica
- Date: 30 November– 5 December 2009
- Countries: Colombia; Costa Rica; Peru; Venezuela

Final positions
- Champions: Colombia
- Runner-up: Venezuela

Tournament statistics
- Matches played: 6

The 2009 South American Rugby Championship "B" was the 10th second tier of national rugby union teams in South America.

The tournament was played in Costa Rica, outside South America, but the hosts were given a place and the right to organize the tournament.

Colombia won the tournament.

== Ranking ==
Team	Played	Won	Drawn	Lost	For	Against	Difference	Points
Colombia	3	3	0	0	115	13	+102	9
Venezuela	3	2	0	1	68	55	+13	7
Peru	3	1	0	2	70	66	+4	5
Costa Rica	3	0	0	3	19	138	−119	3

=== Matches ===
29-Nov-2009

Colombia	33–10	Peru

29-Nov-2009

Costa Rica	8–43	Venezuela

2-Dec-2009

Costa Rica	3–48	Colombia

2-Dec-2009

Venezuela	25–13	Peru

5-Dec-2009

Colombia	34–0	Venezuela

5-Dec-2009

Costa Rica	8–47	Peru
