= Eliseo Branca =

Argentine rugby union player

- Born: Eliseo Nicolás Branca; September 20, 1957 (age 69) Hurlingham, Argentina

Rugby union career
- Position: Lock
Senior career
Years	Team	Apps	(Points)
1973-2000	CASI		
International career
Years	Team	Apps	(Points)
1976-90	Argentina	40	(20)
1982	South American Jaguars	1	(0)
Coaching career
- Years: Team
- 2001-2005: CASI
- 2005-2006: CASI (youth team)
- 2006-2008: CASI
- 2008-: CASI (youth team)

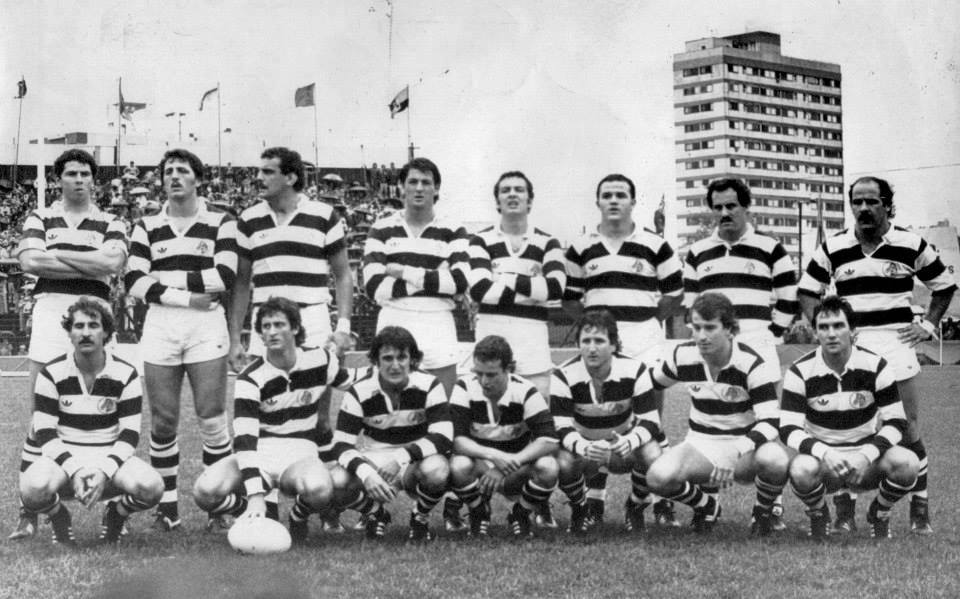
The C.A. San Isidro team that played All Blacks in Buenos Aires. (up): Gabriel Travaglini. Roberto Cobelo, Eliseo Chapa Branca, Jorge Allen, Gustavo Posleman, Daniel Sanés, Andrés Courreges, Fernando Morel

Eliseo Nicolás Branca (born 20 September 1957 in Hurlingham) is an Argentine retired rugby union player. He played as a lock. After leaving his local club, his entire career has been with Club Atlético San Isidro CASI, where he was a player for 27 years, and then a coach.

== Career ==
Hailing from Hurlingham, in the Buenos Aires province, Branca started his career in the local club Curupaytí. He later moved to Club Atlético San Isidro in 1973, with the club, where which he became the captain, and won three URBA titles; the most recent of which, in 1985, was the last won by the club in 20 years.

Branca debuted for Argentina in 1976, at Montevideo against Uruguay, although they were more relevant, they were not recognised as full international, three end-of-the-year matches, being one against a Wales XV and two against an All Blacks XV on tour in South America.

He won the 1985 and 1987 South American Rugby Championships, then, Branca took part with his country at the 1987 Rugby World Cup, where he played all the 3 pool stage matches against Fiji, Italy and New Zealand; he also won the 1989 South American Rugby Championship and in 1990, he ended his international career at Buenos Aires, with a win against England.

In 2000 he also ended his club career, after 27 years in the team; he also won a Nacional de Clubes.

Moving to the coaching career, he led CASI to the conquest of the URBA tournament in 2005 at the end of a final won against the city rivals San Isidro; due to disagreements with the management, he left the main team at the start of 2006 to then resume in the next season. Later, besides coaching the youth team, he is also consultant, since 2009, for the Municipal Rugby School for San Isidro municipality.
