= 2002 South American Rugby Championship "B" =

3° Campeonato Sudamericano de Rugby B
Tournament details
- Host: Peru
- Date: 28 April– 4 May 2002
- Countries: Brazil; Colombia; Peru; Venezuela

Final positions
- Champions: Brazil
- Runner-up: Peru

Tournament statistics
- Matches played: 6

The 2002 South American Rugby Championship "B" was the third edition of the competition of the second level national rugby union teams in South America.

The tournament was played in Lima, with four teams participating.

Brazil won the tournament.

== Standings ==
Three points for a victory, two for a draw, and one for a loss

Team	Played	Won	Drawn	Lost	For	Against	Difference	Pts
Brazil	3	3	0	0	126	22	+ 104	9
Peru	3	2	0	1	58	40	+ 18	7
Venezuela	3	1	0	2	41	57	16	5
Colombia	3	0	0	3	3	109	106	3

== Results ==
- First round

5 October 2002

Brazil	32 - 14	Venezuela

Lima

5 October 2002

Peru	28 - 0	Colombia

Lima

- Second round

8 October 2002

Peru	20 - 12	Venezuela

Lima

8 October 2002

Brazil	64 - 0	Colombia

Lima

- Third round

12 October 2002

Colombia	3 - 17	Venezuela

Lima

12 October 2002

Peru	10 - 28	Brazil

Lima
