= 2001 South American Rugby Championship "B" =

Second edition of Rugby competition

2° Campeonato Sudamericano de Rugby B
- Date: 6 October– 17 November 2001
- Countries: Brazil; Colombia; Peru; Venezuela

Final positions
- Champions: Brazil
- Runner-up: Venezuela

Tournament statistics
- Matches played: 6

The 2001 South American Rugby Championship "B" was the second edition of the competition of the second level national rugby union teams in South America.

The tournament was played at various venues, with four teams participating and was also valid as preliminary round for 2003 Rugby World Cup – Americas qualification.

Brazil won the tournament.

== Standings ==
Three points for a victory, two for a draw, and one for a loss

Team	Played	Won	Drawn	Lost	For	Against	Difference	Pts
Brazil	3	3	0	0	112	24	+ 88	9
Venezuela	3	2	0	1	104	33	+ 71	7
Peru	3	1	0	2	59	110	51	5
Colombia	3	0	0	3	22	130	108	3

== Results ==
6 October 2001

Venezuela	55 - 0	Colombia

Caracas

13 October 2001

Venezuela	46 - 19	Peru

Caracas

27 October 2001

Brazil	51 - 9	Peru

Varginha

3 November 2001

Colombia	12 - 44	Brazil

Bogotá

17 November 2001

Peru	31 - 10	Colombia

Lima

17 November 2001

Brazil	14 - 3	Venezuela

São Paulo
