= 2004 South American Rugby Championship "B" =

5° Campeonato Sudamericano de Rugby B
Tournament details
- Host: Brazil
- Date: 21–27 September 2004
- Countries: Brazil; Colombia; Peru; Paraguay

Final positions
- Champions: Paraguay
- Runner-up: Brazil

Tournament statistics
- Matches played: 6

The 2004 South American Rugby Championship "B" was the fifth edition of the competition of the second level national rugby union teams in South America.

The tournament was played in São Paulo, with four teams participating.

Paraguay won the tournament for the first time.

== Standings ==
Three points for a victory, two for a draw, and one for a loss

Team	Played	Won	Drawn	Lost	For	Against	Difference	Pts
Paraguay	3	3	0	0	175	24	+ 151	9
Brazil	3	2	0	1	164	25	+ 139	7
Peru	3	1	0	2	18	157	139	5
Colombia	3	0	0	3	17	168	151	3

== Results ==
- First round

10 October 2004

Brazil	73 - 3	Peru

São Paulo

10 October 2004

Paraguay	79 - 7	Colombia

São Paulo

- Second round

13 October 2004

Brazil	74 - 0	Colombia

São Paulo

13 October 2004

Paraguay	74 - 0	Peru

São Paulo

- Third round

16 October 2004

Brazil	17 - 22	Paraguay

São Paulo

16 October 2004

Peru	15 - 10	Colombia

São Paulo
