= 2006 South American Rugby Championship "B" =

7° Campeonato Sudamericano de Rugby B
Tournament details
- Host: Venezuela
- Date: 14–22 October 2006
- Countries: Brazil; Colombia; Costa Rica; Peru; Venezuela

Final positions
- Champions: Brazil
- Runner-up: Colombia

Tournament statistics
- Matches played: 10

The 2006 South American Rugby Championship "B" was the seventh edition of the competition of the second level national rugby union teams in South America.

The tournament was played in Caracas.

Brazil won the tournament.

== Standings ==
Three points for a victory, two for a draw, and one for a loss

Team	Played	Won	Drawn	Lost	For	Against	Difference	Pts
Brazil	4	4	0	0	193	16	+ 177	12
Colombia	4	3	0	1	96	67	+ 29	10
Venezuela	4	2	0	2	101	53	+ 48	8
Peru	4	1	0	3	44	68	24	6
Costa Rica	4	0	0	4	8	238	230	4

== Results ==
- First round

14 October 2006

Brazil	36 - 10	Peru

Caracas

14 October 2006

Venezuela	70 - 0	Costa Rica

Caracas

- Second round

16 October 2006

Brazil	95 - 0	Costa Rica

Caracas

16 October 2006

Colombia	28 - 22	Venezuela

Caracas

- Third round

18 October 2006

Colombia	42 - 5	Costa Rica

Caracas

18 October 2006

Venezuela	6 - 0	Peru

Caracas

- Fourth round

20 October 2006

Brazil	37 - 3	Colombia

Caracas

20 October 2006

Costa Rica	3 - 31	Peru

Caracas

- Fifth round

22 October 2006

Colombia	23 - 3	Peru

Caracas

22 October 2006

Venezuela	7 - 23	Brazil

Caracas
