= 2010 South American Rugby Championship "A" =

32° Campeonato Sudamericano de Rugby
Tournament details
- Host: Chile
- Date: 13–23 May 2010
- Countries: Argentina; Brazil; Chile; Paraguay; Uruguay

Final positions
- Champions: Argentina
- Runner-up: Uruguay

Tournament statistics
- Matches played: 8

The 2010 South American Rugby Championship was the 32nd edition of the two tiered competition of the leading national rugby union teams in South America.

In the first phase ("Copa Atilio Rienzi"), four teams played to qualify to the final pool, with Argentina (holder) admitted directly. The first two were qualified, keeping the results of their matches, also for the second round. Uruguay won the pool and Chile was the runner-up.

== Phase 1 ==
=== Standings ===
Team	Played	Won	Drawn	Lost	For	Against	Difference	BP	Pts
Uruguay	3	3	0	0	109	43	+66	0	9
Chile	3	2	0	1	92	50	+42	0	6
Brazil	3	1	0	2	41	75	−34	0	3
Paraguay	3	0	0	3	38	112	−74	0	0

=== Matches ===
13 May 2010

Brazil	10–26	Uruguay

Santiago

13 May 2010

Chile	42–6	Paraguay

Santiago

16 May 2010

Paraguay	14–47	Uruguay

Santiago

16 May 2010

Chile	31–8	Brazil

Santiago

19 May 2010

Brazil	23–18	Paraguay

Santiago

19 May 2010

Chile	19–36	Uruguay

Santiago

== Phase 2 ==
Team	Played	Won	Drawn	Lost	For	Against	Difference	BP	Pts
Argentina	2	2	0	0	86	9	+77	0	6
Uruguay	2	1	0	1	36	57	−21	0	4
Chile	2	0	0	2	28	84	−56	0	2

Argentina won the competition.

== Results ==
21 May 2010

Argentina	38–0	Uruguay

Santiago

23 May 2010

Argentina	48–9	Chile

Santiago

== See also ==
- 2010 South American Rugby Championship "B"
