= 2000 South American Rugby Championship "B" =

1° Campeonato Sudamericano de Rugby B
Tournament details
- Host: Brazil
- Date: 12–18 November 2000
- Countries: Brazil; Venezuela; Peru

Final positions
- Champions: Brazil
- Runner-up: Venezuela

Tournament statistics
- Matches played: 3

The 2000 South American Rugby Championship "B" was the first edition of the competition of the second level national rugby union teams in South America.

The tournament was played in São Paulo, with three teams participating.

Brazil won the tournament.

== Standings ==
Three points for victory, two for a draw, and one for a loss

Team	Played	Won	Drawn	Lost	For	Against	Difference	Pts
Brazil	2	2	0	0	83	12	+ 71	6
Venezuela	2	1	0	1	66	43	+ 23	4
Peru	2	0	0	2	13	107	94	2

== Results ==
12 November 2000

Brazil	53 - 0	Peru

São Paulo

15 November 2000

Peru	13 - 54	Venezuela

São Paulo

18 November 2000

Brazil	30 - 12	Venezuela

São Paulo
