= Antônio Martoni =

- Born: 1961 (age 64–65) São Paulo

Rugby union career
- Position(s): Hooker, Scrumhalf
Amateur team(s)
Years	Team	Apps	(Points)
- Colégio São Luiz
–	Objetivo		
–	Mauá		
–	Nippon		
–	Joerg Bruder		
–	Bandeirantes		
International career
Years	Team	Apps	(Points)
1979-1995	Brazil	70	
Coaching career
- Years: Team
- Brazil

Antônio Martoni Neto (born São Paulo, 1961) is a Brazilian former rugby union player, coach and he is currently a rugby commentator for ESPN Brazil. He played first as a hooker, later moving to scrum-half. He is professionally a lawyer. He is usually considered one of the best Brazilian rugby union players of ever.

Martoni started his player career at Colégio São Luiz. He later would play for Objetivo, Mauá, Nippon, Joerg Bruder and Bandeirantes, a team he helped to start, in 1983, and he would represent most of his career, finished in 2000. He also played football as a youngster and decided for rugby union over football at 18. He won for Bandeirantes the Brazilian Championship B Series title, in 1983, and 2 Brazilian Championship titles, in 1988 and 1995. He also won 4 São Paulo State Championship titles, in 1990, 1996, 1998 and 2000.

Martoni had more than 70 caps for Brazil, from 1979 to 1995. He had his debut at the South American Rugby Championship, at 7 October 1979, in a 53-6 loss to Chile, in Viña del Mar. He scored his first points in that game.

He became a coach when he finished his player career, in 2000. He was the coach of Bandeirantes and at the same time of Brazil national team. He achieved Brazil first international titles, at the South American Rugby Championship B, in 2000 and 2002. He was also in charge of the Brazilian side during the 2003 Rugby World Cup qualifyings, and after two years without losses, he managed to improve his IRB ranking position from 69th to 36th.

Martoni is a rugby commentator for ESPN since 2003, he has been covering the most important international competitions for the sports channel.
