= 1997 South American Rugby Championship =

20° Campeonato Sudamericano de Rugby
- Date: 24 August– 4 October 1997
- Countries: Argentina; Chile; Paraguay; Uruguay

Final positions
- Champions: Argentina
- Runner-up: Uruguay

Tournament statistics
- Matches played: 6

The 1997 South American Rugby Championship was the 20th edition of the competition of the leading national rugby union teams in South America.

The tournament was not played in a host country, but at different venues in each country participating.

Argentina won the tournament.

== Standings ==
Team	Played	Won	Drawn	Lost	For	Against	Difference	Pts
Argentina	3	3	0	0	184	27	+ 157	6
Uruguay	3	2	0	1	116	82	+ 34	4
Chile	3	1	0	2	85	98	13	2
Paraguay	3	0	0	3	25	203	178	0

== Results ==
24 August 1997

Uruguay	32–17	Chile

Carrasco Polo, Montevideo

30 August 1997

Chile	58–16	Paraguay

Santiago

13 September 1997

Argentina	78–0	Paraguay

Aranduroga RC, Corrientes

20 September 1997

Paraguay	9–67	Uruguay

Asunción

27 September 1997

Uruguay	17–56	Argentina

Carrasco Polo, Montevideo

4 October 1997

Argentina	50–10	Chile

Maristas RC, Mendoza
