= Rugby union in Bolivia =

- Country: Bolivia
- Governing body: Federación Boliviana de Rugby
- National team: Bolivia
- First played: 1960s or earlier

Rugby union in Bolivia is a minor, but growing sport.

== Governing body ==
The governing body is the Federación Boliviana de Rugby, which is affiliated to CONSUR, but not to the International Rugby Board.

== History ==
Rugby in South America is dominated by Argentina, and to a lesser extent Uruguay (who have qualified for the Rugby World Cup) and Chile and is most popular in the southern part of the continent. However, rugby can be found in almost all the South American nations, partly because of massive immigration from Europe, notably the British Isles and France. Rugby was also introduced to some regions of the continent by the Irish Marist Brothers and their schools.

However, Bolivian rugby was not really established from these waves of European immigration in the 19th and early 20th century, but during the late 20th century. The impetus came partly through large numbers of foreign nationals working for various countries, but most especially people from Argentina. It has been claimed for example that British workers connected with the mines were playing in the mid 20th century.

The confirmed roots of Bolivian rugby go back to the 1960s, when José Pipo Viale, from Córdoba, Argentina introduced the game to Cochabamba. As in Paraguay, the French have been instrumental in expanding the game. French diplomats from the Embassy, and the Colegio Franco Boliviano produced a team which managed to tour Chile, and played an informal match against a French Guiana side touring South America.

Traditionally rugby is most popular in La Paz, the capital, but it is also fairly successful in the Santa Cruz region, and is played by some university sides. There are also clubs in Cochabamba and Tarija.

The interest in Santa Cruz was partially the result of a community of Argentine expatriates, who formed a club with the locals. The first Santa Cruz team was Jenecheru.

The first Bolivian Club Championship was in 2006.

Touring sides occasionally visit from neighbouring countries.

== Teams of 2010 Bolivian Championship ==
- Jenecherú
- Santa Cruz
- Universitário de Cochabamba
- La Paz
- Tarija
- Brangus
- Supay Rugby Club
