= 1975 South American Rugby Championship =

9° Campeonato Sudamericano de Rugby
Tournament details
- Host: Paraguay
- Date: 20–28 September 1975
- Countries: Argentina; Brazil; Chile; Paraguay; Uruguay

Final positions
- Champions: Argentina
- Runner-up: Chile

Tournament statistics
- Matches played: 10

The 1975 South American Rugby Championship was the ninth edition of the competition of the leading national rugby union teams in South America.

The tournament was played in Asunción and won by Argentina.

== Standings ==
Team	Played	Won	Drawn	Lost	For	Against	Difference	Pts
Argentina	4	4	0	0	232	24	+ 208	8
Chile	4	3	0	1	93	65	+ 28	6
Uruguay	4	2	0	2	98	70	+ 28	4
Brazil	4	1	0	3	42	139	97	2
Paraguay	4	0	0	4	27	194	167	0

== Results ==
- First round

20 September 1975

Brazil	0–31	Chile

Colegio San José, Asunción

21 September 1975

Argentina	30–15	Uruguay

Colegio San José, Asunción

- Second round

21 September 1975

Paraguay	6–19	Brazil

Colegio San José, Asunción

23 September 1975

Brazil	7–38	Uruguay

Colegio San José, Asunción

- Third round

23 September 1975

Paraguay	3–44	Chile

Colegio San José, Asunción

25 September 1975

Paraguay	0–93	Argentina

Colegio San José, Asunción

- Fourth round

25 September 1975

Chile	15–7	Uruguay

Colegio San José, Asunción

27 September 1975

Argentina	64–6	Brazil

Colegio San José, Asunción

- Fifth round

28 September 1975

Paraguay	18–38	Uruguay

Colegio San José, Asunción

28 September 1975

Argentina	45–3	Chile

Colegio San José, Asunción
