= 1991 South American Rugby Championship =

17° Campeonato Sudamericano de Rugby
- Date: 15 August– 1 October 1991
- Countries: Argentina; Brazil; Chile; Paraguay; Uruguay

Final positions
- Champions: Argentina
- Runner-up: Uruguay

Tournament statistics
- Matches played: 10

The 1991 South American Rugby Championship was the 17th edition of the competition of the leading national rugby union teams in South America.

For the first time, the tournament was not played in a host country, but in different venues in each country participating.

== Standings ==
Team	Played	Won	Drawn	Lost	For	Against	Difference	Pts
Argentina	4	4	0	0	194	31	+ 163	8
Uruguay	4	3	0	1	109	70	+ 39	6
Chile	4	2	0	2	72	109	37	4
Paraguay	4	1	0	3	74	97	23	2
Brazil	4	0	0	4	35	177	142	0

== Results ==
15 August 1991

Chile	6–41	Argentina

Prince of Wales CC, Santiago

17 August 1991

Uruguay	29–13	Paraguay

Montevideo

19 August 1991

Chile	25–18	Paraguay

Santiago

21 August 1991

Brazil	16–23	Chile

SP Athletic, São Paulo

7 September 1991

Brazil	49–21	Paraguay

SP Athletic, São Paulo

8 September 1991

Chile	18–34	Uruguay

Prince of Wales CC, Santiago

21 September 1991

Argentina	32–9	Uruguay

Club Atlético San Isidro, Buenos Aires

28 September 1991

Paraguay	10–37	Argentina

Asunción

28 September 1991

Uruguay	37–7	Brazil

Old Cristians, Montevideo

1 October 1991

Argentina	84–6	Brazil

Belgrano Athletic Club, Buenos Aires
