= 1981 South American Rugby Championship =

12° Campeonato Sudamericano de Rugby
Tournament details
- Host: Uruguay
- Date: 16–20 May 1981
- Countries: Brazil; Chile; Paraguay; Uruguay

Final positions
- Champions: Uruguay
- Runner-up: Chile

Tournament statistics
- Matches played: 6

The 1981 South American Rugby Championship was the twelfth edition of the competition of the leading national rugby union teams in South America.

The tournament was played in Montevideo and was won by Uruguay. Argentina did not participate.

== Standings ==
Team	Played	Won	Drawn	Lost	For	Against	Difference	Pts
Uruguay	3	3	0	0	164	17	+ 147	6
Chile	3	2	0	1	69	39	+ 30	4
Paraguay	3	1	0	2	52	90	38	2
Brazil	3	0	0	3	6	145	139	0

== Results ==
- First round

16 May 1981

Chile	33–3	Brazil

Carrasco Polo Club, Montevideo

16 May 1981

Uruguay	54–14	Paraguay

Carrasco Polo Club, Montevideo

- Second round

18 May 1981

Chile	33–3	Paraguay

Carrasco Polo Club, Montevideo

18 May 1981

Uruguay	77–0	Brazil

Carrasco Polo Club, Montevideo

- Third round

20 May 1981

Uruguay	33–3	Chile

Carrasco Polo Club, Montevideo

20 May 1981

Paraguay	35–3	Brazil

Carrasco Polo Club, Montevideo

== Notes and references ==
- IRB – South American Championship 1981
- Union Argentina de Rugby (December 1981). "MEMORIA Temporada año 1981" (PDF) (in Spanish). Archived from the original (.pdf) on 2012-11-01.
