= Sudamérica Rugby =

Governing body for rugby union

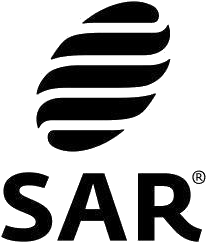
- Formation: 14 October 1988; 38 years ago
- Founded at: Asunción, Paraguay
- Type: Sport
- Region served: South and Central America
- Members: 16 unions
- President: (Uruguay) Sebastián Piñeyrúa
- Vice-President: (Uruguay) Marcello Calandra
- Affiliations: World Rugby
- Website: sudamerica.rugby

Sudamérica Rugby (previously known as Confederación Sudamericana de Rugby (abbreviated CONSUR) between 1988 and 2015) is the governing body for rugby union within South America and most of Central America. It was created on 14 October 1988 in Asunción on the initiative of Argentina, Brazil, Chile, Paraguay, and Uruguay, counting with a total of 16 unions.

The confederation currently has nine full World Rugby member nations, with one associate member, and is responsible for running various rugby tournaments within South America, especially the South American Rugby Championship.

== History ==
Although there was a meeting of associations during the 1961 Championship, the body was officially established as "Confederación Sudamericana de Rugby" (South American Rugby Confederation) on October 14, 1988, in the Yacht and Golf Club of Asunción, Paraguay. The act of foundation was signed by members of Argentina, Brazil, Chile, Paraguay, and Uruguay.

The members also set up the Copa Libertadores de Rugby, contested by the national champions of each association, to be held in Punta del Este. According with the act, the Confederation was created with the aim of promoting the spreading and development of amateur rugby within South America, and organising rugby competitions in the region.

Following a suggestion made by World Rugby, the Confederation changed its name to "Sudamérica Rugby" in 2015.

In 2019, Sudamérica Rugby announced the creation of "Superliga Americana", the first professional competition in the region. To begin in February 2020, the tournament will be contested by five clubs of five countries, playing in a double round-robin basis. At the end of the regular phase, the four best placed teams will qualify to play the semi-finals, while team placed 5th. will play two matches versus the Colombian representative, which added in 2021.

Franchised team Ceibos, based in Córdoba and made up of players from Argentina XV and Jaguares, will represent Argentina at the competition. Former Puma Ignacio Fernández Lobbe was appointed as coach of Los Ceibos. The other teams taking part in the tournament will be Corinthians (Brazil), Selknam (Chile), Cafeteros Pro (Colombia), Olimpia Lions (Paraguay), and Peñarol (Uruguay).

== Member unions ==
- Argentina
- Bolivia ^{[1]}
- Brazil
- Chile
- Colombia
- Costa Rica
- Ecuador ^{[1]}
- El Salvador ^{[1]}
- Guatemala
- Honduras ^{[1]}
- Nicaragua ^{[1]}
- Panama ^{[1]}
- Paraguay
- Peru
- Uruguay
- Venezuela

Notes

- ^{[1]} Not affiliated with World Rugby

== Competitions ==
| Tournament | Class | Categories |
|---|---|---|
| South American Championship | National teams | Senior (A, B, C) |
| Americas Rugby Trophy | National teams | Women's |
| South American Junior Championship | National teams | Youth (U-20, U18) |
| South America Sevens | National teams | Senior, U-20, U-18 |
| South America Women's Sevens | National teams | Women's, Women's U-18 |
| Súper Liga Americana de Rugby | Club teams | Senior |

== National teams rankings ==
Men's World Rugby Rankings (as of 2 January 2023)
| South America* | World Rugby | ± | National Team | Points |
|---|---|---|---|---|
| 1 | 8 | Steady | Argentina | 80.72 |
| 2 | 17 | Steady | Uruguay | 66.24 |
| 3 | 22 | Steady | Chile | 60.89 |
| 4 | 27 | Steady | Brazil | 55.23 |
| 5 | 37 | Steady | Colombia | 48.69 |
| 6 | 39 | Steady | Paraguay | 48.14 |
| 7 | 72 | Steady | Peru | 36.35 |
| 8 | 76 | Steady | Venezuela | 35.87 |
| 9 | 97 | Steady | Costa Rica | 29.36 |
*Local rankings based on World Rugby ranking points

Women's World Rugby Rankings (as of 2 January 2023)
| South America* | World Rugby | ± | National Team | Points |
|---|---|---|---|---|
| 1 | 26 | Steady | Colombia | 45.18 |
| 2 | 47 | Steady | Brazil | 36.38 |
*Local rankings based on World Rugby ranking points

== World Cup qualifying ==
Sudamérica Rugby nations participate in qualifying tournaments for the Rugby World Cup every four years. Three Sudamérica Rugby nations –Argentina, Uruguay and Chile – have qualified to play in Rugby World Cups.

| Edition | Automatically qualified | Qualified via competition | Qualified via repechage | Eliminated in repechage | Eliminated at final stage | Eliminated at third stage | Eliminated at second stage | Eliminated at first stage |
|---|---|---|---|---|---|---|---|---|
| 1987 | Argentina | —N/a | —N/a | —N/a | —N/a | —N/a | —N/a | —N/a |
| 1991 | —N/a | Argentina | —N/a | —N/a | —N/a | —N/a | —N/a | —N/a |
| 1995 | —N/a | Argentina | —N/a | —N/a | Uruguay; Paraguay; Chile | —N/a | —N/a | —N/a |
| 1999 | —N/a | Argentina | Uruguay | —N/a | Chile; Paraguay | —N/a | —N/a | Brazil |
| 2003 | Argentina | Uruguay | —N/a | —N/a | Chile | —N/a | Paraguay; Brazil | Venezuela; Peru; Colombia |
| 2007 | —N/a | Argentina | —N/a | Uruguay | Chile | —N/a | Paraguay; Brazil | Venezuela; Peru; Colombia |
| 2011 | Argentina | —N/a | —N/a | Uruguay | Chile; Brazil | —N/a | —N/a | Paraguay; Venezuela; Peru; Colombia |
| 2015 | Argentina | —N/a | Uruguay | —N/a | Chile; Brazil | —N/a | Paraguay | Colombia; Venezuela; Peru |
| 2019 | Argentina | Uruguay | —N/a | —N/a | Chile; Brazil; Paraguay | —N/a | Colombia | Guatemala; Peru; Venezuela; Ecuador |
| 2023 | Argentina | Uruguay; Chile | —N/a | —N/a | —N/a | —N/a | Brazil | Colombia; Paraguay |
| 2027 | Argentina | Uruguay | Chile | Brazil | Paraguay | Colombia | —N/a | Venezuela; Peru; Costa Rica |

== See also ==
- World Rugby
- Rugby Americas North
- Americas Rugby Championship
