= 1983 South American Rugby Championship =

Tournament details
- Host: Argentina
- Venue: Estadio del CASI, San Isidro
- Dates: 16–23 July 1983
- Countries: Argentina; Chile; Paraguay; Uruguay

Final positions
- Champions: Argentina
- Runner-up: Uruguay

Tournament statistics
- Matches played: 6

The 1983 South American Rugby Championship was the 13th edition of the competition of the leading national rugby union teams in South America.

All the matches were played in Estadio del CASI in San Isidro, home venue of Club Atlético San Isidro. Argentina was the winner of the competition.

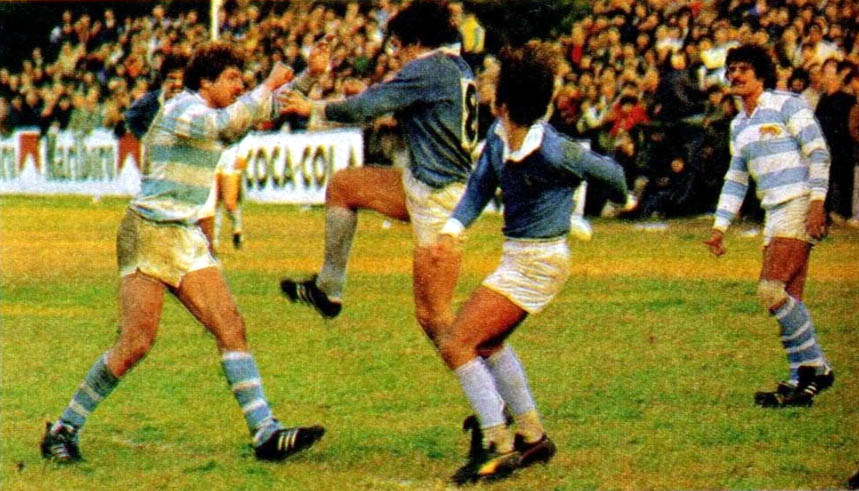
A moment of the final, Argentina v Uruguay

== Standings ==
Team	Played	Won	Drawn	Lost	For	Against	Difference	Pts
Argentina	3	3	0	0	118	15	+ 103	6
Uruguay	3	2	0	1	51	44	+ 7	4
Chile	3	1	0	2	33	83	50	2
Paraguay	3	0	0	3	27	87	60	0

== Results ==
Source: Page of IRB - South American Championship 1983

- First round

16 July 1983

Uruguay	20–12	Paraguay

Estadio del CASI, San Isidro

16 July 1983

Argentina	46–6	Chile

Estadio del CASI, San Isidro

- Second round

20 July 1983

Argentina	43–3	Paraguay

Estadio del CASI, San Isidro

20 July 1983

Uruguay	25–3	Chile

Estadio del CASI, San Isidro

- Third round

23 July 1983

Argentina	29–6	Uruguay

Estadio del CASI, San Isidro

23 July 1983

Chile	24–12	Paraguay

Estadio del CASI, San Isidro
