= 2010 South American Rugby Championship "B" =

11° Campeonato Sudamericano de Rugby B
Tournament details
- Host: Colombia
- Date: 24–30 October 2010
- Countries: Colombia; Costa Rica; Peru; Venezuela

Final positions
- Champions: Colombia
- Runner-up: Peru

Tournament statistics
- Matches played: 6

The 2010 South American Rugby Championship "B" was the 11th edition of the second-tier competition of the leading national rugby union teams in South America. Division B was organised in Medellín, Colombia from 24 to 31 October 2010. The participating nations were Colombia, Peru, Venezuela and Costa Rica.

Meanwhile, the Under-20 tournament was played, won by Colombia.

In the main championship the winner was Peru.

== Standings ==
Team	Played	Won	Drawn	Lost	For	Against	Difference	BP	Pts
Peru	3	3	0	0	95	17	+78	0	9
Venezuela	3	2	0	1	62	45	+17	0	6
Colombia	3	1	0	2	94	55	+39	0	3
Costa Rica	3	0	0	3	17	151	−134	0	0

== Matches ==
24 October 2010

Colombia	61–6	Costa Rica

Medellín

25 October 2010

Peru	13–5	Venezuela

Medellín

27 October 2010

Venezuela	29–6	Costa Rica

Medellín

27 October 2010

Colombia	7–21	Peru

Medellín

30 October 2010

Peru	61–5	Costa Rica

Medellín

30 October 2010

Colombia	26–28	Venezuela

Medellín
