= 1979 South American Rugby Championship =

11° Campeonato Sudamericano de Rugby
Tournament details
- Host: Chile
- Date: 4–12 October 1979
- Countries: Argentina; Brazil; Chile; Paraguay; Uruguay

Final positions
- Champions: Argentina
- Runner-up: Uruguay

Tournament statistics
- Matches played: 10

The 1979 South American Rugby Championship was the eleventh edition of the competition of the leading national rugby union teams in South America.

The tournament was played in Chile, and was won by Argentina.

== Standings ==
Team	Played	Won	Drawn	Lost	For	Against	Difference	Pts
Argentina	4	4	0	0	238	47	+ 191	8
Uruguay	4	2	1	1	126	37	+ 89	5
Chile	4	2	1	1	104	62	+ 42	5
Brazil	4	1	0	3	25	216	191	2
Paraguay	4	0	0	4	41	172	131	0

== Results ==
- First round

4 October 1979

Argentina	19–16	Uruguay

Stade Francais, Santiago

4 October 1979

Chile	27–13	Paraguay

Stade Francais, Santiago

- Second round

6 October 1979

Brazil	0–48	Uruguay

Stade Francais, Santiago

6 October 1979

Chile	15–34	Argentina

Stade Francais, Santiago

- Third round

7 October 1979

Argentina	76–13	Paraguay

Estadio Sausalito, Vina del Mar

7 October 1979

Chile	53–6	Brazil

Estadio Sausalito, Vina del Mar

- Fourth round

9 October 1979

Paraguay	9–53	Uruguay

Stade Francais, Santiago

9 October 1979

Argentina	109–3	Brazil

Stade Francais, Santiago

- Fifth round

12 October 1979

Brazil	16–6	Paraguay

Stade Francais, Santiago

12 October 1979

Chile	9–9	Uruguay

Stade Francais, Santiago
