= 2001 South American Rugby Championship "A" =

23° Campeonato Sudamericano de Rugby
- Date: 6 October– 24 November 2001
- Countries: Argentina; Chile; Paraguay; Uruguay

Final positions
- Champions: Argentina
- Runner-up: Uruguay

Tournament statistics
- Matches played: 6

The 2001 South American Rugby Championship was the 23rd edition of the competition of the leading national rugby union teams in South America.

The tournament was not played in a host country.

Argentina (who played with the "Development XV") won the tournament.

== Preliminary ==
8 September 2001

Paraguay	22–13	Brazil

Asunción

=== Standings ===
Three points for a victory, two for a draw, and one for a loss

Team	Played	Won	Drawn	Lost	For	Against	Difference	Pts
Argentina	3	3	0	0	174	45	+ 129	9
Uruguay	3	2	0	1	95	78	+ 17	7
Chile	3	1	0	2	78	68	+ 10	5
Paraguay	3	0	0	3	23	179	156	3

== Results ==
6 October 2001

Uruguay	62–8	Paraguay

Carrasco Polo Club, Montevideo

13 October 2001

Uruguay	26–7	Chile

Old Christians, Montevideo

27 October 2001

Chile	48–0	Paraguay

Santiago

10 November 2001

Paraguay	19–65	Argentina

Asunción

17 November 2001

Chile	23–42	Argentina

Santiago

24 November 2001

Argentina	63–7	Uruguay

La Plata RC
