= 1998 South American Rugby Championship =

21° Campeonato Sudamericano de Rugby
- Date: 3–17 October 1998
- Countries: Argentina; Chile; Paraguay; Uruguay

Final positions
- Champions: Argentina
- Runner-up: Uruguay

Tournament statistics
- Matches played: 6

The 1998 South American Rugby Championship was the 21st edition of the competition of the leading national rugby union teams in South America.

The tournament was not played in a host country, but in different venues in each country participating.

Argentina (which played with the "development XV") won the tournament.

== Standings ==
Team	Played	Won	Drawn	Lost	For	Against	Difference	Pts
Argentina	3	3	0	0	114	31	+ 83	6
Uruguay	3	2	0	1	127	46	+ 81	4
Chile	3	1	0	2	88	62	+ 26	2
Paraguay	3	0	0	3	20	210	190	0

== Results ==
List of matches played:

3 October 1998

Argentina	59–0	Paraguay

San José RC, Asunción

3 October 1998

Chile	20–13	Uruguay

Prince of Wales CC, Santiago

10 October 1998

Paraguay	3–93	Uruguay

Carrasco Polo Club, Montevideo

10 October 1998

Chile	17–25	Argentina

Prince of Wales CC, Santiago

17 October 1998

Argentina	30–14	Uruguay

CASI Stadium, San Isidro

17 October 1998

Paraguay	17–58	Chile

Asunción
