= 1971 South American Rugby Championship =

7° Sudamericano de Rugby
Tournament details
- Host: Uruguay
- Date: 10–17 October 1971
- Countries: Argentina; Brazil; Chile; Paraguay; Uruguay

Final positions
- Champions: Argentina
- Runner-up: Chile

Tournament statistics
- Matches played: 3

The 1971 South American Rugby Championship was the seventh edition of the competition of the leading national rugby union teams in South America.

The tournament was played in Montevideo and was won by Argentina.

Argentina, champions

== Standings ==
Team	Played	Won	Drawn	Lost	For	Against	Difference	Pts
Argentina	4	4	0	0	192	15	+177	8
Chile	4	3	0	1	99	29	+70	6
Uruguay	4	2	0	2	105	80	+25	4
Brazil	4	1	0	3	32	144	−112	2
Paraguay	4	0	0	4	9	169	−160	0

== Results ==
- First round

10 October 1971

Uruguay	56–3	Paraguay

Carrasco Polo, Montevideo

10 October 1971

Argentina	20–3	Chile

Carrasco Polo, Montevideo

- Second round

12 October 1971

Argentina	50–6	Brazil

Carrasco Polo, Montevideo

12 October 1971

Uruguay	6–11	Chile

Carrasco Polo, Montevideo

- Third round

14 October 1971

Uruguay	37–11	Brazil

Carrasco Polo, Montevideo

14 October 1971

Chile	40–0	Paraguay

Carrasco Polo, Montevideo

- Fourth round

16 October 1971

Argentina	61–0	Paraguay

Carrasco Polo, Montevideo

16 October 1971

Brazil	3–45	Chile

Carrasco Polo, Montevideo

- Fifth round

17 October 1971

Brazil	12–6	Paraguay

Carrasco Polo, Montevideo

17 October 1971

Uruguay	6–55	Argentina

Carrasco Polo, Montevideo
