= 1977 South American Rugby Championship =

10° Campeonato Sudamericano de Rugby
Tournament details
- Host: Argentina
- Date: 23–28 October 1973
- Countries: Argentina; Brazil; Chile; Paraguay; Uruguay

Final positions
- Champions: Argentina
- Runner-up: Uruguay

Tournament statistics
- Matches played: 10

The 1977 South American Rugby Championship was the tenth edition of the competition of the leading national rugby union teams in South America.

The tournament was played in Tucuman and was won by Argentina.

== Standings ==
Team	Played	Won	Drawn	Lost	For	Against	Difference	Pts
Argentina	4	4	0	0	250	19	+ 231	8
Uruguay	4	3	0	1	84	110	26	6
Chile	4	2	0	2	83	128	+ 7	4
Paraguay	4	1	0	3	38	128	90	2
Brazil	4	0	0	4	61	183	122	0

== Results ==
- First round

23 October 1977

Argentina	70–0	Uruguay

C.A. Concepción, Tucuman

23 October 1977

Chile	22–3	Paraguay

C.A. Concepción, Tucuman

- Second round

24 October 1977

Argentina	78–6	Brazil

C.A. Concepción, Tucuman

24 October 1977

Uruguay	16–7	Paraguay

C.A. Concepción, Tucuman

- Third round

27 October 1977

Paraguay	25–13	Brazil

C.A. Concepción, Tucuman

27 October 1977

Uruguay	21–18	Chile

C.A. Concepción, Tucuman

- Fourth round

29 October 1977

Argentina	77–3	Paraguay

C.A. Concepción, Tucuman

29 October 1977

Chile	33–27	Brazil

C.A. Concepción, Tucuman

- Fifth round

30 October 1977

Argentina	25–10	Chile

C.A. Concepción, Tucuman

30 October 1977

Uruguay	47–15	Brazil

C.A. Concepción, Tucuman
