= 1973 South American Rugby Championship =

8° Campeonato Sudamericano de Rugby
Tournament details
- Host: Brazil
- Date: 14–21 October 1973
- Countries: Argentina; Brazil; Chile; Paraguay; Uruguay

Final positions
- Champions: Argentina
- Runner-up: Uruguay

Tournament statistics
- Matches played: 10

The 1973 South American Rugby Championship was the eighth edition of the competition of the leading national rugby union teams in South America.

The tournament was played in São Paulo and won by Argentina.

== Standings ==
Team	Played	Won	Drawn	Lost	For	Against	Difference	Pts
Argentina	4	4	0	0	309	6	+ 303	8
Uruguay	4	3	0	1	60	80	20	6
Chile	4	2	0	2	62	79	17	4
Brazil	4	1	0	3	31	137	106	2
Paraguay	4	0	0	4	18	178	160	0

== Results ==
- First round

14 October 1973

Argentina	98–3	Paraguay

S.P: Athletic Club, São Paulo

14 October 1973

Chile	10–13	Uruguay

S.P: Athletic Club, São Paulo

- Second round

16 October 1973

Argentina	55–0	Uruguay

S.P: Athletic Club, São Paulo

16 October 1973

Brazil	3–22	Chile

S.P: Athletic Club, São Paulo

- Third round

18 October 1973

Brazil	6–16	Uruguay

S.P: Athletic Club, São Paulo

18 October 1973

Chile	27–3	Paraguay

S.P: Athletic Club, São Paulo

- Fourth round

20 October 1973

Paraguay	9–31	Uruguay

S.P: Athletic Club, São Paulo

20 October 1973

Brazil	0–96	Argentina

S.P: Athletic Club, São Paulo

- Fifth round

21 October 1973

Brazil	22–3	Paraguay

S.P: Athletic Club, São Paulo

21 October 1973

Argentina	60–3	Chile

S.P: Athletic Club, São Paulo
