= South American Rugby Championship =

- Sport: Rugby union
- First season: 1951
- Organizing body: Sudamérica Rugby
- No. of teams: 13
- Most recent champion: Uruguay (2025)
- Most titles: Argentina (36 titles)
- Related competitions: Americas Championship
- Tournament format: Round robin

The South American Rugby Championship refers to the continental rugby union championships for South America, organized by Sudamérica Rugby. The current name of the championships is South American Six Nations, implemented in 2018. South American championships have also existed for lower divisions of the rugby union championships, as well as youth and women tournaments, and editions for rugby sevens.

== History ==
The South American Rugby Championship is a round-robin tournament, with each team playing each other once at a designated host stadium. The top level championship for men's rugby union, disputed annually, has received a number of different titles in history. It began in 1951 as Sudamericano de Rugby, which lasted until 1998. From 1951 to 1998, only Argentina, Chile and Uruguay were the core teams in the tournament. They competed alongside occasional additions of Brazil, Paraguay and Peru, with the winner being decided on which team finishes with the most table points.

In 2000, a second division was added, which meant the bottom placed team of the A division had a play-off match with the top placed team of the B division, although this did not apply to every tournament due to the Rugby World Cup qualification formats. In 2012, a third Division was added, which meant that until 2014, the bottom placed team of the B division would play a play-off match against the top placed C Division team. Although like A and B, this did not apply to every tournament due to the Rugby World Cup qualification format.

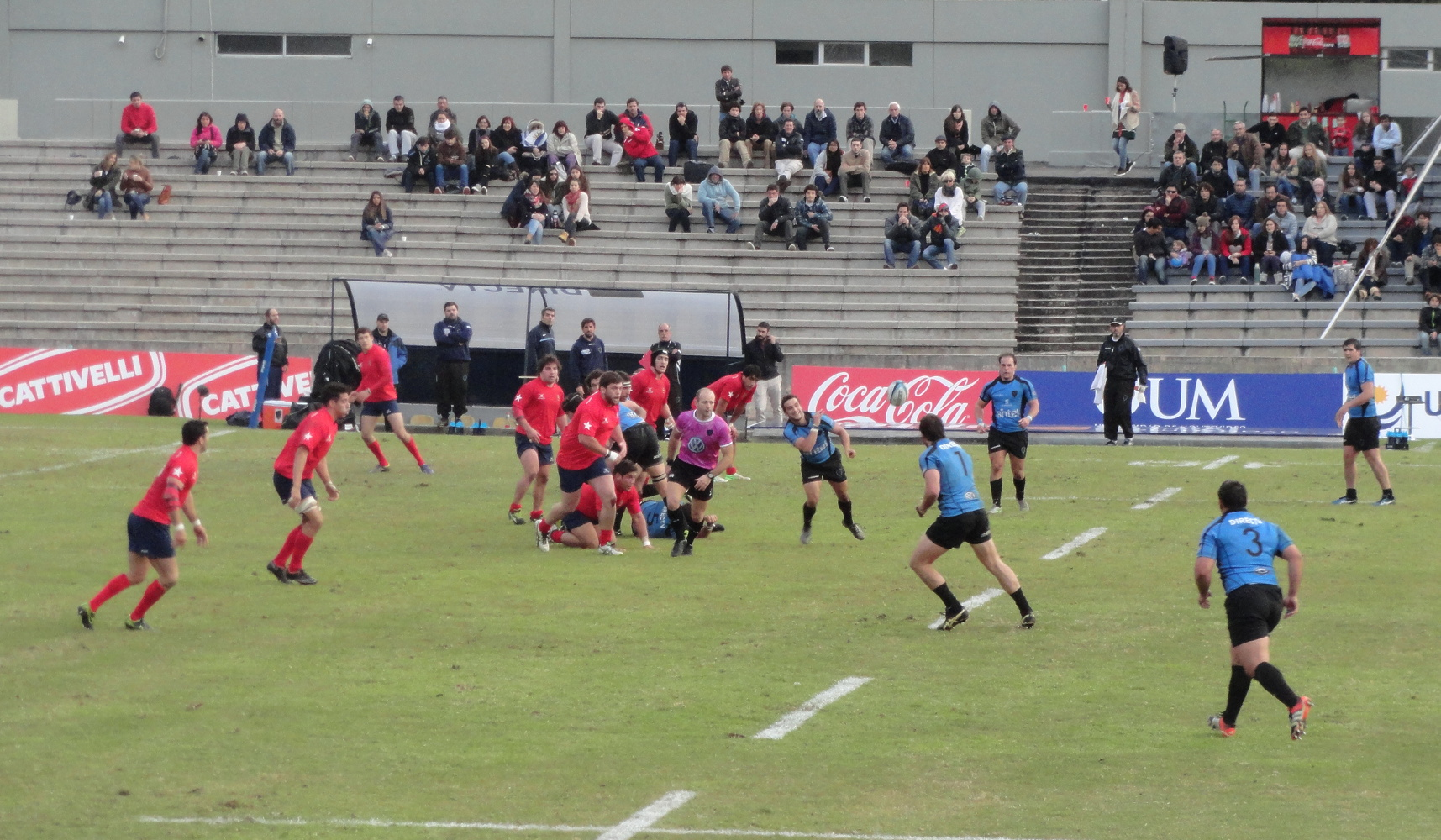
2016 second level of South American Rugby Championship match between Uruguay and Chile

In 2014, the tournament became a four-tiered competition, with Argentina no longer competing as a regular. However, the tournament would keep the same format for promotion and relegation. The top placed team from Division C would play a play-off match against the bottom placed team from Division B to determine which Division those teams are in for the succeeding tournament. The winner of the play-off match would earn a place in Division B for the succeeding tournament; the loser would play in Division C the following year. This worked in the same way for Divisions A and B. The top placed team of Division B would play a play-off match against the bottom placed team from Division A to determine which divisions those teams would play in for the succeeding tournament. The winner of the play-off match would earn a place in Division A for the succeeding tournament, while the loser would play in Division B the following year.

However, the top two teams of Division A would compete at a separate competition, the CONSUR Cup, alongside Argentina, the following year regardless of their positions of that year. The CONSUR Cup was staged in 2014 and 2015, and the events were the de facto South American Championships for those years. In 2016 and 2017, the CONSUR Cup was renamed to Sudamérica Rugby Cup, but the format was kept intact. The Sudamérica Rugby Cup, in 2016 and 2017, can also be considered the de facto South American Championships for those years. In 2018, the format of the tournament was changed once again: six teams (Argentina, Brazil, Chile, Colombia, Paraguay and Uruguay) would play in the top division, which was renamed to South American Six Nations.

Argentina is the most dominant nation at the South American Championships, winning 34 of 40 editions, as well as the two editions of the CONSUR Cup, and the two editions of the Sudamérica Rugby Cup. Uruguay won the tournament four times (1981, 2014, 2016 and 2017), while Chile (2015) and Brazil (2018) won the South American title once.

== Results ==
=== List of tournaments ===
The first edition of the South American Rugby Championships was organized in 1951 as a parallel competition to the inaugural edition of the Pan American Games, in Buenos Aires, Argentina. In 2000, a second division was added, which changed the name of the first and main division of the tournament to Mayor A (Senior A), while the second division was called Mayor B (Senior B). Teams from Central America were also allowed to compete at the South American Championships. In 2012, a third division, Mayor C (Senior C) was added. In 2018, the tournament was renamed to South American Six Nations.

Tournament names:
- Sudamericano de Rugby (1951–98)
- Mayor A (2000–17)
- South American Six Nations (2018–19)
- South American Four Nations (2020)

Ed.	Year	Host	Winner	Runner-up	Third place	Fourth place
1	1951	Argentina	Argentina	Uruguay	Chile	Brazil
2	1958	Chile	Argentina	Chile	Uruguay	Peru
3	1961	Uruguay	Argentina	Chile	Uruguay	Brazil
4	1964	Brazil	Argentina	Brazil	Uruguay	Chile
5	1967	Argentina	Argentina	Chile	Uruguay	
6	1969	Chile	Argentina	Chile	Uruguay	
7	1971	Uruguay	Argentina	Chile	Uruguay	Brazil
8	1973	Brazil	Argentina	Uruguay	Chile	Brazil
9	1975	Paraguay	Argentina	Chile	Uruguay	Brazil
10	1977	Argentina	Argentina	Uruguay	Chile	Paraguay
11	1979	Chile	Argentina	Uruguay	Chile	Brazil
12	1981	Uruguay	Uruguay	Chile	Paraguay	Brazil
13	1983	Argentina	Argentina	Uruguay	Chile	Paraguay
14	1985	Paraguay	Argentina	Uruguay	Chile	Paraguay
15	1987	Chile	Argentina	Uruguay	Chile	Paraguay
16	1989	Uruguay	Argentina	Uruguay	Chile	Brazil
17	1991	No fixed host	Argentina	Uruguay	Chile	Paraguay
18	1993	No fixed host	Argentina	Uruguay	Paraguay	Chile
19	1995	No fixed host	Argentina	Uruguay	Chile	Paraguay
20	1997	No fixed host	Argentina	Uruguay	Chile	Paraguay
21	1998	No fixed host	Argentina	Uruguay	Chile	Paraguay
22	2000	Uruguay	Argentina	Uruguay	Chile	
23	2001	No fixed host	Argentina XV (Note: "Argentina XV" (nicknamed Jaguares) is the second national side.)	Uruguay	Chile	Paraguay
24	2002	Argentina; Chile	Argentina XV	Uruguay	Chile	Paraguay
25	2003	Uruguay	Argentina	Uruguay	Chile	Paraguay
26	2004	Chile	Argentina	Uruguay	Chile	Venezuela
27	2005	Argentina	Argentina XV	Uruguay	Chile	
28	2006	No fixed host	Argentina	Uruguay	Chile	
29	2007	No fixed host	Argentina (Note: In 2007, the competition was not completed due to difficulties in finding a date for the match between Argentina and Uruguay, as it was the first time they participated in the final phase of the Rugby World Cup.)	Uruguay	Chile	
30	2008	No fixed host	Argentina	Uruguay	Chile	
31	2009	Chile; Uruguay	Argentina XV	Uruguay	Chile	Brazil
32	2010	Chile	Argentina	Uruguay	Chile	Brazil
33	2011	Argentina	Argentina XV	Chile	Uruguay	Brazil
34	2012	Chile	Argentina	Uruguay	Chile	Brazil
35	2013	Uruguay	Argentina	Uruguay	Chile	Brazil
36	2014	No fixed host	Uruguay (Note: From 2014 to 2017, the Mayor A division of the championships excluded Argentina. The top team of the Mayor A division would be considered the winner of the first stage, and would later play the CONSUR/Sudamérica Rugby Cup, alongside the second placed team in Mayor A division, and Argentina.)	Paraguay	Brazil	Chile
37	2015	No fixed host	Chile	Uruguay	Paraguay	Brazil
38	2016	No fixed host	Uruguay	Chile	Brazil	Paraguay
39	2017	No fixed host	Uruguay	Chile	Brazil	Paraguay
40	2018	No fixed host	Brazil	Argentina XV	Chile	Uruguay XV
41	2019	No fixed host	Argentina XV	Uruguay XV	Chile	Brazil
42	2020	Uruguay	Argentina XV	Chile XV	Uruguay XV	Brazil XV Uruguay XV
43	2025	No fixed host	Uruguay	Chile	Paraguay	Brazil

=== Statistics by team ===
Team	Titles	Years won
Argentina	36	1951, 1958, 1961, 1964, 1967, 1969, 1971. 1973, 1975, 1977, 1979, 1983, 1985, 1987, 1989, 1991, 1993, 1995, 1997, 1998, 2000, 2001, 2002, 2003, 2004, 2005, 2006, 2007, 2008, 2009, 2010, 2011, 2012, 2013, 2019, 2020
Uruguay	5	1981, 2014, 2016, 2017, 2025
Chile	1	2015
Brazil	1	2018

== CONSUR/Sudamérica Rugby Cup ==
From 2014 to 2017, the first division of the South American Championships, Mayor A (Senior A), excluded Argentina. The top two teams of the Mayor A division would then join Argentina in a future tournament, the CONSUR Cup (in 2014 and 2015) or the Sudamérica Rugby Cup (in 2016 and 2017). The winner of the CONSUR/Sudamérica Cup would then be the de facto best team of the continent for that year.

Tournament names:
- CONSUR Cup (2014–15)
- Sudamérica Rugby Cup (2016–17)

Ed.	Year	Host	Winner	Runner-up	Third place
1	2014	No fixed host	Argentina	Uruguay	Chile
2	2015	No fixed host	Argentina	Uruguay	Paraguay
3	2016	No fixed host	Argentina	Uruguay	Chile
4	2017	No fixed host	Argentina	Uruguay	Chile

== Lower divisions ==
=== Mayor B ===
Ed.	Year	Host	Winner	Runner-up	Third place
1	2000	Brazil	Brazil	Venezuela	Peru
2	2001	No fixed host	Brazil	Venezuela	Peru
3	2002	Peru	Brazil	Peru	Venezuela
4	2003	Colombia	Venezuela	Brazil	Colombia
5	2004	Brazil	Paraguay	Brazil	Peru
6	2005	Paraguay	Paraguay	Brazil	Peru
7	2006	Venezuela	Brazil	Colombia	Venezuela
8	2007	Peru	Brazil	Peru	Colombia
9	2008	Peru	Brazil	Paraguay	Venezuela
10	2009	Paraguay	Colombia	Venezuela	Peru
11	2010	Costa Rica	Peru	Venezuela	Colombia
12	2011	Colombia	Venezuela	Peru	Colombia
13	2012	Peru	Paraguay	Colombia	Venezuela
14	2013	Paraguay	Paraguay	Colombia	Peru
15	2014	Colombia	Colombia	Venezuela	Peru
16	2015	Peru	Colombia	Peru	Venezuela
17	2016	Peru	Colombia	Venezuela	Peru
18	2017	Colombia, Peru	Colombia	Venezuela	Peru
19	2018	Guatemala	Peru	Guatemala	Costa Rica
20	2022	Colombia	Brazil	Colombia	Paraguay
21	2023	Paraguay	Brazil	Paraguay	Chile XV

=== Mayor C ===
Ed.	Year	Host	Winner	Runner-up	Third place
1	2012	Guatemala	Costa Rica	Guatemala	Ecuador
2	2013	Costa Rica	Ecuador	Costa Rica	Guatemala
3	2014	Panama	El Salvador	Guatemala	Costa Rica
4	2015	El Salvador	Guatemala	Costa Rica	El Salvador
5	2016	Guatemala	Guatemala	Costa Rica	Panama
6	2018	No fixed host	Panama	El Salvador	Honduras

== See also ==
- Americas Rugby Championship
