= 1995 South American Rugby Championship =

19° Campeonato Sudamericano de Rugby
- Date: 22 September– 8 October 1995
- Countries: Argentina; Chile; Paraguay; Uruguay

Final positions
- Champions: Argentina
- Runner-up: Uruguay

Tournament statistics
- Matches played: 6

The 1995 South American Rugby Championship was the 19th edition of the competition of the leading national rugby union teams in South America.

The tournament was not played in a host country, but at different venues in each country participating.

Argentina won the tournament. Brazil did not participate.

== Standings ==
Team	Played	Won	Drawn	Lost	For	Against	Difference	Pts
Argentina	3	3	0	0	233	49	+ 184	6
Uruguay	3	2	0	1	116	77	+ 39	4
Chile	3	1	0	2	40	123	83	2
Paraguay	3	0	0	3	35	175	140	0

== Results ==
22 September 1995

Paraguay	14–24	Chile

Estadio de la Fuerzas, Asunción

24 September 1995

Chile	13–31	Uruguay

Prince of Wales CC, Santiago

24 September 1995

Paraguay	9–103	Argentina

Estadio de la Fuerzas, Asunción

30 September 1995

Chile	3–78	Argentina

Prince of Wales CC, Santiago

1 October 1995

Uruguay	48–12	Paraguay

Estadio de la Fuerzas, Asunción

8 October 1995

Uruguay	37–52	Argentina

Tucarù Social Club, Posadas
