= 1985 South American Rugby Championship =

14° Campeonato Sudamericano de Rugby
Tournament details
- Host: Paraguay
- Date: 15–21 September 1985
- Countries: Argentina; Chile; Paraguay; Uruguay

Final positions
- Champions: Argentina
- Runner-up: Uruguay

Tournament statistics
- Matches played: 6

The 1985 South American Rugby Championship was the 14th edition of the competition of the leading national rugby union teams in South America.

The tournament was played in Asunción and won by Argentina.

== Standings ==
Team	Played	Won	Drawn	Lost	For	Against	Difference	Pts
Argentina	3	3	0	0	224	25	+ 199	6
Uruguay	3	1	1	1	35	75	40	3
Chile	3	1	0	2	24	81	57	2
Paraguay	3	0	1	2	24	126	102	1

== Results ==
- First round

15 September 1985

Paraguay	12–15	Chile

Estadio Gen. P. Rojas, Asunción

17 September 1985

Argentina	63–16	Uruguay

Estadio Gen. P. Rojas, Asunción

- Second round

19 September 1985

Uruguay	9–9	Paraguay

Estadio Gen. P. Rojas, Asunción

19 September 1985

Argentina	59–6	Chile

Estadio Gen. P. Rojas, Asunción

- Third round

21 September 1985

Paraguay	3–102	Argentina

Estadio Gen. P. Rojas, Asunción

21 September 1985

Uruguay	9–3	Chile

Estadio Gen. P. Rojas, Asunción
