= 2007 South American Rugby Championship "A" =

29° Campeonato Sudamericano de Rugby
- Date: 28 August– 15 December 2007
- Countries: Argentina; Chile; Uruguay

Tournament statistics
- Matches played: 2

The 2007 South American Rugby Championship was the 29th edition of the now multi-divisional rugby competition involving the top rugby nations from South America.

Division A consisted of three teams and was played on a home and away basis. Two points are awarded for a win and one for a draw.

The competition was not completed, because of the difficulties of finding a date for the match between Argentina and Uruguay, as it was the first time they had participated in the final phase of the Rugby World Cup.

== Standings ==
Country	GP	W	D	L	+/-	Pts
Argentina A	1	1	0	0	+71	2
Uruguay	1	1	0	0	+1	2
Chile	2	0	0	2	−72	0

=== Results ===
25 August 2007

Chile	34–35	Uruguay

Montevideo

15 Dec 2007

Chile	8–79	Argentina XV
	Report

Hilario Sánchez Stadium, San Juan

Uruguay	NOT PLAYED	Argentina XV
