= 1969 South American Rugby Championship =

6° Sudamericano de Rugby
Tournament details
- Host: Chile
- Date: 4–11 October 1969
- Countries: Argentina; Chile; Uruguay

Final positions
- Champions: Argentina
- Runner-up: Chile

Tournament statistics
- Matches played: 3

The 1969 South American Rugby Championship was the sixth edition of the competition of the leading national rugby union teams in South America.

The tournament was played in Santiago and was won by Argentina.

== Standings ==
Team	Played	Won	Drawn	Lost	For	Against	Difference	Pts
Argentina	2	2	0	0	95	6	+89	4
Chile	2	1	0	1	13	60	−47	2
Uruguay	2	0	0	2	12	54	−42	0

== Results ==
4 October 1969

Argentina	41–6	Uruguay

Prince oF Wales CC, Santiago

7 October 1969

Chile	13–6	Uruguay

Prince oF Wales CC, Santiago

11 October 1969

Chile	0–54	Argentina XV

Prince oF Wales CC, Santiago
