= 1987 South American Rugby Championship =

15° Campeonato Sudamericano de Rugby
Tournament details
- Host: Chile
- Date: 27 September– 3 October 1987
- Countries: Argentina; Chile; Paraguay; Uruguay

Final positions
- Champions: Argentina
- Runner-up: Uruguay

Tournament statistics
- Matches played: 6

The 1987 South American Rugby Championship was the 15th edition of the competition of the leading national rugby union teams in South America.

The tournament was played in Santiago, and was won by Argentina.

== Standings ==
Team	Played	Won	Drawn	Lost	For	Against	Difference	Pts
Argentina	3	3	0	0	150	34	+ 116	6
Uruguay	3	2	0	1	74	72	+ 2	4
Chile	3	1	0	2	56	96	40	2
Paraguay	3	0	0	3	32	110	78	0

== Results ==
- First round

27 September 1987

Argentina	41–21	Uruguay

Stade Francais, Santiago

27 September 1987

Chile	28–16	Paraguay

Stade Francais, Santiago

- Second round

30 September 1987

Argentina	62–4	Paraguay

Stade Francais, Santiago

30 September 1987

Chile	19–33	Uruguay

Stade Francais, Santiago

- Third round

3 October 1987

Argentina	47–9	Chile

Stade Francais, Santiago

3 October 1987

Uruguay	20–12	Paraguay

Stade Francais, Santiago
