= 2004 South American Rugby Championship "A" =

26° Campeonato Sudamericano de Rugby
Tournament details
- Host: Chile
- Date: 25 April– 1 May 2004
- Countries: Argentina; Chile; Uruguay; Venezuela

Final positions
- Champions: Argentina
- Runner-up: Uruguay
- Relegated: Venezuela

Tournament statistics
- Matches played: 6

The 2004 South American Rugby Championship was the 26th edition of the competition of the leading national rugby union teams in South America.

The tournament was played in Santiago, Chile with four teams participating.

Argentina won the tournament. Venezuela participated for the first time as the winner of the 2003 "B" championship.

== Standings ==
Three points for a victory, two for a draw, and one for a loss

Team	Played	Won	Drawn	Lost	For	Against	Difference	Pts
Argentina	3	3	0	0	261	20	+ 241	9
Uruguay	3	2	0	1	122	90	+ 32	7
Chile	3	1	0	2	111	68	+ 43	5
Venezuela	3	0	0	3	18	334	316	3

== Results ==
- First round

25 April 2004

Argentina	45–3	Chile

Prince of Wales CC, Santiago

25 April 2004

Uruguay	92–8	Venezuela

Prince of Wales CC, Santiago

- Second round

28 April 2004

Argentina	69–10	Uruguay

Prince of Wales CC, Santiago

28 April 2004

Chile	95–3	Venezuela

Prince of Wales CC, Santiago

- Third round

1 May 2004

Argentina	147–7	Venezuela

Prince of Wales CC, Santiago

1 May 2004

Chile	13–20	Uruguay

Prince of Wales CC, Santiago
