= 1967 South American Rugby Championship =

5° Sudamericano de Rugby
Tournament details
- Host: Argentina
- Date: 16 September– 1 October 1967
- Countries: Argentina; Chile; Uruguay

Final positions
- Champions: Argentina
- Runner-up: Chile

Tournament statistics
- Matches played: 3

The 1967 South American Rugby Championship was the fifth edition of the competition of the leading national rugby union teams in South America.

The tournament was played in Buenos Aires and was won by Argentina.

== Standings ==
| Team | Played | Won | Drawn | Lost | For | Against | Difference | Pts |
|---|---|---|---|---|---|---|---|---|
| Argentina | 2 | 2 | 0 | 0 | 56 | 6 | +50 | 4 |
| Chile | 2 | 1 | 0 | 1 | 16 | 29 | −13 | 2 |
| Uruguay | 2 | 0 | 0 | 2 | 17 | 54 | −37 | 0 |

== Results ==
28 September 1967

| Argentina | 38–6 | Uruguay |

Club Atlético San Isidro, Buenos Aires

30 September 1967

| Argentina | 18–0 | Chile |

Club Atlético San Isidro, Buenos Aires

1 October 1967

| Chile | 16–11 | Uruguay |

Club Atlético San Isidro, Buenos Aires
