= 2002 South American Rugby Championship "A" =

24° Campeonato Sudamericano de Rugby
Tournament details
- Host: Argentina
- Date: 28 April– 4 May 2002
- Countries: Argentina; Chile; Paraguay; Uruguay

Final positions
- Champions: Argentina
- Runner-up: Uruguay

Tournament statistics
- Matches played: 6

The 2002 South American Rugby Championship was the 24th edition of the competition of the leading national rugby union teams in South America.

The tournament was played in Mendoza and Santiago, with four teams participating.

Argentina won the tournament.

== Standings ==
Three points for victory, two for a draw, and one for a loss

Team	Played	Won	Drawn	Lost	For	Against	Difference	Pts
Argentina	3	3	0	0	244	34	+ 210	9
Uruguay	3	2	0	1	135	59	+ 76	7
Chile	3	1	0	2	86	95	9	5
Paraguay	3	0	0	3	13	290	277	3

== Results ==
28 April 2002

Argentina	35–21	Uruguay

Estadio Bautista Gargantini, Mendoza

28 April 2002

Chile	57–5	Paraguay

CARR de la Reina, Santiago

1 May 2002

Uruguay	33–16	Chile

Estadio Bautista Gargantini, Mendoza

1 May 2002

Argentina	152–0	Paraguay

Estadio Bautista Gargantini, Mendoza

4 May 2002

Uruguay	81–6	Paraguay

Estadio Bautista Gargantini, Mendoza

4 May 2002

Argentina	57–13	Chile

Estadio Bautista Gargantini, Mendoza
