= Americas Rugby Trophy =

- Current season, competition or edition: 2023 Americas Rugby Trophy
- Sport: Rugby union
- Founded: 2023; 3 years ago
- First season: 2023
- No. of teams: 3
- Countries: Brazil; Colombia; United States
- Most recent champion: United States

The Americas Rugby Trophy is an international women's rugby union competition sanctioned by World Rugby, and Sudamérica Rugby. It was contested by the top two South American nations, Colombia, and Brazil.

== Background ==
Sudamérica Rugby, with funding from World Rugby, organised the first women's fifteens competition for the region. Brazil hosted the inaugural tournament from the 3rd to the 11th of June, 2023. Brazil, and Colombia competed with a development team from the United States. The meet was used as preparation for both South American teams for the third division of WXV in its first season.

Sudamérica Rugby is focused on the development of women's fifteens within the region, although Brazil and Colombia are the only two teams that are able to compete internationally, more teams from the region are expected to join soon.

== Results ==
| Year | Host | Winner | Runner-up |
|---|---|---|---|
| 2023 | Brazil | United States U23 | Colombia |

== See also ==
- Women's international rugby union - includes all women's international match results
