= 2000 South American Rugby Championship "A" =

22° Campeonato Sudamericano de Rugby
- Date: 12–18 November 2000
- Countries: Argentina; Chile; Uruguay

Final positions
- Champions: Argentina
- Runner-up: Uruguay

Tournament statistics
- Matches played: 3

The 2000 South American Rugby Championship was the 22nd edition of the competition of the leading national rugby union teams in South America.

The tournament was played in Montevideo, with three teams participating. Paraguay withdrew.

Argentina (who played with the "Development XV") won the tournament.

== Standings ==
Three points for a victory, two for a draw, and one for a loss

Team	Played	Won	Drawn	Lost	For	Against	Difference	Pts
Argentina	2	2	0	0	47	35	+ 12	6
Uruguay	2	1	0	1	30	38	8	4
Chile	2	0	0	2	25	29	4	2

== Results ==
12 November 2000

Uruguay	11–9	Chile

Carrasco Polo Club, Montevideo

16 November 2000

Argentina	18–16	Chile

Carrasco Polo Club, Montevideo

18 November 2000

Uruguay	19–29	Argentina

Carrasco Polo Club, Montevideo
