= 2008 South American Rugby Championship "A" =

30° Campeonato Sudamericano de Rugby
- Date: 31 May– 22 November 2008
- Countries: Argentina; Chile; Uruguay

Final positions
- Champions: Argentina
- Runner-up: Uruguay

Tournament statistics
- Matches played: 3

The 2008 South American Rugby Championship was the 30th edition of the now multi-divisional rugby competition involving the top rugby nations from South America.

Division A consisted of three teams and was played on a home and away basis. Two points are awarded for a win and one for a draw.

Argentina won the tournament, playing with the "A" team.

== Standings ==
Country	GP	W	D	L	+/-	Pts
Argentina A	2	2	0	0	+103	4
Uruguay	2	1	0	1	-1	2
Chile	2	0	0	2	−114	0

=== Results ===
31 May 2008

Uruguay	8–43	Argentina XV

Montevideo

8 November 2008

Chile	3–71	Argentina XV

Santiago

22 November 2008

Uruguay	46–12	Chile

Montevideo
