= 2005 South American Rugby Championship "A" =

27° Campeonato Sudamericano de Rugby
Tournament details
- Host: Argentina
- Date: 8–15 May 2005
- Countries: Argentina; Chile; Uruguay

Final positions
- Champions: Argentina
- Runner-up: Uruguay

Tournament statistics
- Matches played: 3

The 2005 South American Rugby Championship was the 27th edition of the competition of the leading national rugby union teams in South America.

The tournament was played in Buenos Aires, Argentina. Argentina won the tournament with the selection of Argentinian Provinces ("Provincias Argentinas"), practically the third level selection.

== Standings ==
Three points for a victory, two for a draw, and one for a loss

Team	Played	Won	Drawn	Lost	For	Against	Difference	Pts
Argentina	2	2	0	0	75	34	+ 41	6
Uruguay	2	1	0	1	55	52	+ 3	4
Chile	2	0	0	2	38	82	-44	2

== Results ==
- First round

8 May 2005

Provincias Argentinas (Argentina)	48–13	Chile
	Report

Monte Grande RC

- Second round

11 May 2005

Uruguay	34–25	Chile
	Report

Monte Grande RC

- Third round

15 May 2005

Provincias Argentinas (Argentina)	27–21	Uruguay
	Report

Los Matreros RC, Castelar
