= 1989 South American Rugby Championship =

16° Campeonato Sudamericano de Rugby
Tournament details
- Host: Uruguay
- Date: 6–14 October 1989
- Countries: Argentina; Brazil; Chile; Paraguay; Uruguay

Final positions
- Champions: Argentina
- Runner-up: Uruguay

Tournament statistics
- Matches played: 10

The 1989 South American Rugby Championship was the 16th edition of the competition of the leading national rugby union teams in South America.

The tournament was played in Montevideo and was won by Argentina.

== Standings ==
Team	Played	Won	Drawn	Lost	For	Against	Difference	Pts
Argentina	4	4	0	0	248	30	+ 218	8
Uruguay	4	3	0	1	109	71	+ 38	6
Chile	4	2	0	2	87	84	+ 3	4
Brazil	4	1	0	3	73	207	134	2
Paraguay	5	0	0	4	34	159	125	0

== Results ==
- First round

6 October 1989

Uruguay	44–13	Brazil

Estadio Charrúa, Montevideo

6 October 1989

Chile	12–9	Paraguay

Estadio Charrúa, Montevideo

- Second round

8 October 1989

Argentina	103–9	Brazil

Estadio Charrúa, Montevideo

8 October 1989

Uruguay	31–7	Paraguay

Estadio Charrúa, Montevideo

- Third round

10 October 1989

Argentina	36–9	Chile

Estadio Charrúa, Montevideo

10 October 1989

Brazil	40–11	Paraguay

Estadio Charrúa, Montevideo

- Fourth round

12 October 1989

Argentina	75–7	Paraguay

Estadio Charrúa, Montevideo

12 October 1989

Uruguay	19–17	Chile

Estadio Charrúa, Montevideo

- Fifth round

14 October 1989

Argentina	34–14	Uruguay

Estadio Charrúa, Montevideo

14 October 1989

Brazil	20–49	Chile

Estadio Charrúa, Montevideo
