= Guatemala Rugby Union =

Asociacion Deportiva Nacional de Rugby de Guatemala
- Sport: Rugby union
- World Rugby affiliation: 2016
- Sudamérica Rugby affiliation: 2014
- Website: egyptrugby.com

The Guatemala Rugby Union is the governing body for rugby union in Guatemala. They became a full member of Sudamérica Rugby in 2014 and an associate member of World Rugby in 2016. They have 29 men’s and women’s teams and participates in regional tournaments.

On 14 November 2024, Guatemala was granted World Rugby Full Member status by the World Rugby Council.
