= 2006 South American Rugby Championship "A" =

28° Campeonato Sudamericano de Rugby
- Date: 1–22 July 2006
- Countries: Argentina; Chile; Uruguay

Final positions
- Champions: Argentina
- Runner-up: Uruguay

Tournament statistics
- Matches played: 3

The 2006 South American Rugby Championship was the 28th edition of the competition of the leading national rugby union teams in South America.

The tournament, that was also valid as the final stage of South Americas 2007 Rugby World Cup qualification, was not played in a host country, but each of the three countries participating hosted a match.

Argentina won the tournament.

== Standings ==
Three points for a victory, two for a draw, and one for a loss

Team	Played	Won	Drawn	Lost	For	Against	Difference	Pts
Argentina	2	2	0	0	86	13	+ 73	6
Uruguay	2	1	0	1	43	41	+ 2	4
Chile	2	0	0	2	28	103	75	2

== Results ==
- First round

1 July 2006

Chile	13–60	Argentina

Santiago

- Second round

8 July 2006

Argentina	26–0	Uruguay
	Report

CASI Stadium, San Isidro

- Third round

22 July 2006

Uruguay	43–15	Chile

Montevideo
