= 1961 South American Rugby Championship =

3° Sudamericano de Rugby
Tournament details
- Host: Uruguay
- Date: 8–14 October 1961
- Countries: Argentina; Brazil; Chile; Uruguay

Final positions
- Champions: Argentina
- Runner-up: Chile

Tournament statistics
- Matches played: 6

The 1961 South American Rugby Championship was the third edition of the competition of the leading national rugby union teams in South America.

The tournament was played in Uruguay and was won by Argentina.

== Standings ==
Team	Played	Won	Drawn	Lost	For	Against	Difference	Pts
Argentina	3	3	0	0	107	6	+101	6
Chile	3	2	0	1	65	21	+44	4
Uruguay	3	1	0	2	19	72	−53	2
Brazil	3	0	0	3	13	105	−92	0

== Results ==
8 October 1961

Argentina	11–3	Chile

Carrasco Polo, Montevideo

8 October 1961

Uruguay	11–8	Brazil

Carrasco Polo, Montevideo

12 October 1961

Argentina	60–0	Brazil

Carrasco Polo, Montevideo

12 October 1961

Uruguay	5–28	Chile

Carrasco Polo, Montevideo

14 October 1961

Uruguay	3–36	Argentina

Carrasco Polo, Montevideo

14 October 1961

Brazil	5–34	Chile

Carrasco Polo, Montevideo
