= Chile national rugby union team =

Rugby union team

Chile
- Nickname: Los Cóndores (The Condors)
- Emblem: Andean condor
- Union: Chilean Rugby Federation
- Head coach: Pablo Lemoine
- Captain: Martín Sigren
- Most caps: José Ignacio Larenas (50)
- Top scorer: Santiago Videla (245)
- Top try scorer: José Ignacio Larenas (11)
- Home stadium: Estadio Santa Laura
First colours	Second colours

World Rugby ranking
- Current: 18 (as of 9 November 2026)
- Highest: 16 (2026)
- Lowest: 31 (2018)

First international
- Chile 0–29 Argentina (Valparaíso, Chile; 20 September 1936)

Biggest win
- Chile 102–0 Paraguay (Montevideo, Uruguay; 3 May 2003)

Biggest defeat
- Argentina 89–6 Chile (Montevideo, Uruguay; 20 May 2009)

World Cup
- Appearances: 2 (first in 2023)
- Best result: Pool stage (2023)
- Website: chile.rugby

The Chile national rugby union team represents the Chilean Rugby Federation in men's international rugby union. Nicknamed Los Cóndores (The Condors in English), they play in red and white, the country's national colours. They are currently ranked 16th in the World Rugby Rankings, and have been historically the third highest-ranked nation in South America.

Chile was the second South American nation after Argentina to play international rugby union, playing their first international test against Argentina in 1936 in Santiago. In 1989, Chile was one of the founding members of Sudamérica Rugby, alongside Argentina, Brazil, Paraguay, and Uruguay. Chile has long been participating in the South American Rugby Championship since 1951 and has consistently been the third or even the second best team in South America. In 2016, Chile, alongside the unions of Argentina, Brazil, Canada, the United States, and Uruguay, formed the Americas Rugby Championship, aimed at increasing the standard of rugby union in the Americas region.

Chile qualified for the 2023 Rugby World Cup, which was their first appearance in the tournament. They upset Canada in a two-game series in October 2021, before defeating the United States in a two-game home-and-home series on aggregate by 1 point in July 2022. Chile were drawn with England, Japan, Argentina, and Samoa in Pool D of the World Cup.

The sport has historic connections to the Scottish community in the country. In 2012, two Scottish-Chilean players, Donald and Ian Campbell, were inducted into the IRB (now World Rugby) Hall of Fame.

== History ==
=== Early history (1890s – 1959) ===
Rugby was introduced in Chile roughly around the late 19th century, as it was in other parts of South America by British immigrants who arrivedal in ports. The first recorded rugby game taking place on Chilean soil was in 1894, from British immigrants who lived in both Santiago, Iquique and Valparaíso. Until the 1930s, the game was initially mostly played by the British-descended community of Chile. In 1935, the Chilean Rugby Federation was founded.

Chile's first ever fixtures were against Argentina in September 1936, a two-game series played in the capital Santiago. Chile lost both of their games by scorelines of 0 to 20 and 3 to 31, respectively. Chile would visit Argentina in 1938 in Buenos Aires, losing 3 to 33. Chile would not play another fixture until 1948, where they beat Uruguay 21 to 3 in Buenos Aires.

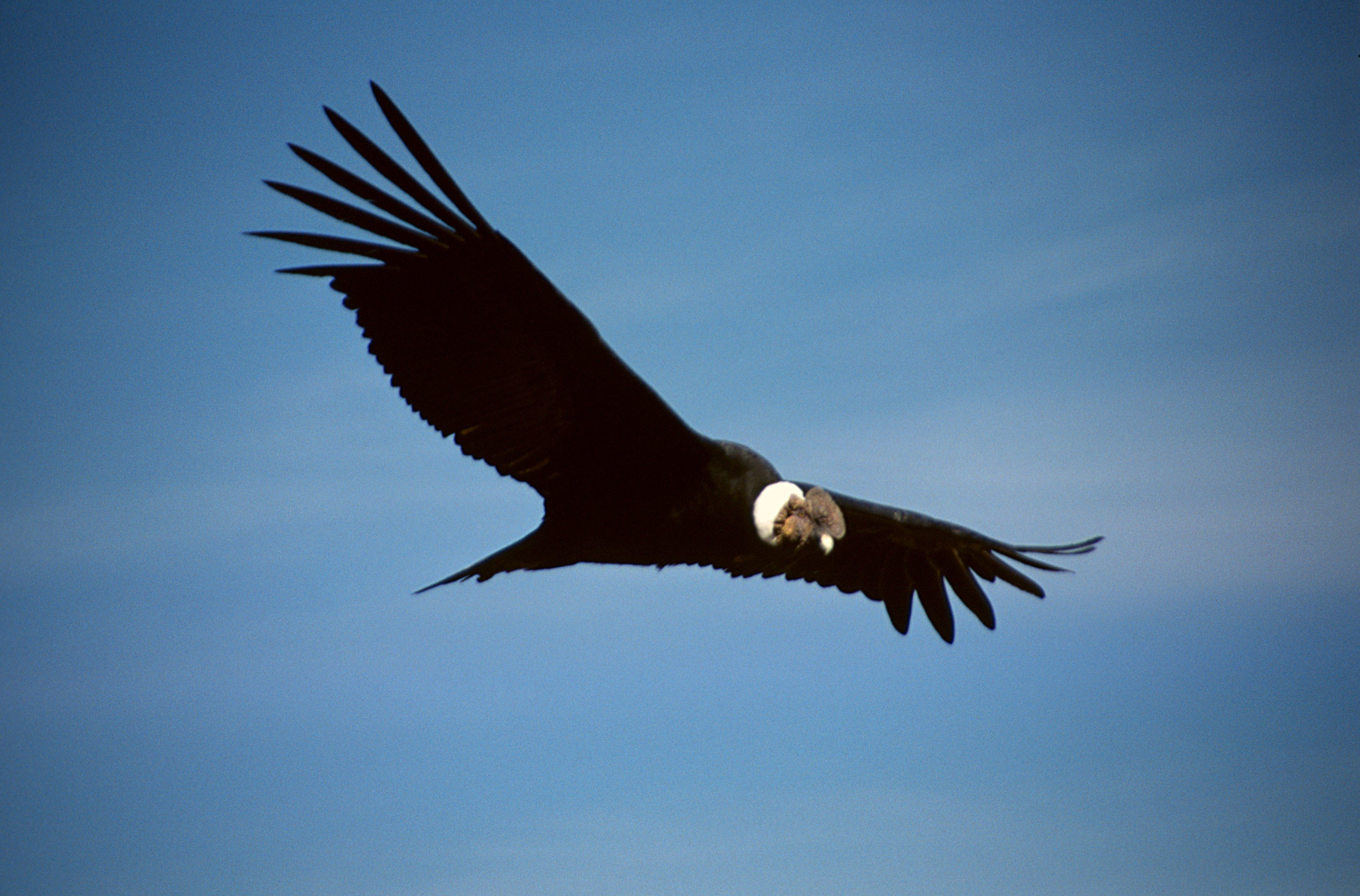
Chilean condor is the main representative of the team.

The Chilean team began competing more consistently in the 1950s. In 1951, Chile played the first South American Rugby Championship against Brazil, Uruguay and Argentina in 1951; Chile finished third, beating Brazil by a margin of 68 to nil, but losing to both Uruguay and Argentina. In 1952, Chile received Ireland on tour, but lost in Santiago 30 to 0. Chile would play another Five Nations side, this time France on tour, but lost 34–3. In 1958, Chile participated in the second South American Rugby Championship, finishing second; Chile easily beat both Peru and Uruguay before falling to Argentina, finishing second.

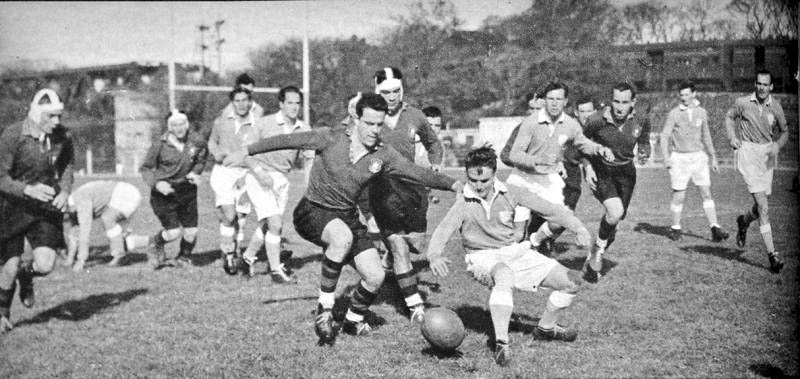
Chile against Los Teros at the 1951 South American Rugby Championship.

=== 1960s – 1980s ===
By the 1960s Chile saw itself established as a middle contender in South America. Chile were consistently beating sides like Brazil and Uruguay, but couldn't breakthrough against the mighty Argentina. In 1966, Chile received the Springboks, their first test against a SANZAR side, but lost 72 to 0. During the 1970s Chile didn't play any non-South American competition; for the most part Chile were finishing second or third in South America, usually beating Brazil and newcomers Paraguay, and dog fighting for second against Uruguay. In the 1980s, former coach of France Jean-Pierre Juanchich took over administration of rugby in Chile, which led to better promotion, awareness, and improvement in Chilean rugby. In 1989, a proper governing body for rugby in South America, CONSUR, was formed.

=== 1990s – 2000s ===
Chile formally joined the International Rugby Board in 1991, allowing Chile to participate formally in World Cup competitions. In 1993, Chile participated in its first ever World Cup Qualifying competition in 1993, entering qualifying for the 1995 Rugby World Cup; however, they lost all their fixtures to Argentina, Paraguay, and Uruguay, finishing bottom of the group. In 1995, Chile played Spain, winning 28 – 23.

The 1999 Rugby World Cup qualifying campaign was more successful. Chile easily swept through a group containing the teams of Bermuda and Trinidad and Tobago. However, Chile lost 14 to 20 against Uruguay, therefore missing out on a repechage spot, and potentially a spot in the World Cup.

In 2000, Chile came within 2 points of defeating Argentina. This improved form would continue through the early 2000s, easily disposing of Brazil in their first qualifier for the 2003 Rugby World Cup. In the final round, a round robin containing Canada, Uruguay, and the United States, the Chileans won their first home fixture versus Uruguay before losing their next two to the US and Canada. Despite this, Chile recorded an upset, defeating the United States 21 to 13 in Santiago. Despite being improved, Chile dropped their next two games, finishing the campaign with 2 wins and 4 losses. Unfortunately for Chile, they finished bottom on try difference, yet again missing out on a repechage spot, and potential qualification.

Chile then took part at an Intercontinental Cup at home in Santiago in November 2004. Where they recorded arguably one their greatest victories at the time, defeating an up and coming Georgia side 30-24.

The 2007 qualifiers were mostly the same song as the previous campaigns; Chile swept their first round against Paraguay and Brazil but in the final group lost both their games to Argentina and Uruguay, which once again would have secured a repechage at least, and potentially an automatic spot in the World Cup.

The 2011 campaign was short-lived, having automatically been seeded into Round 3A of the qualifiers in the new format. Chile cruised to victory versus Brazil but once again lost to familiar foes Uruguay, and once again missing out on a potential repechage or automatic qualifier.

=== 2010s ===
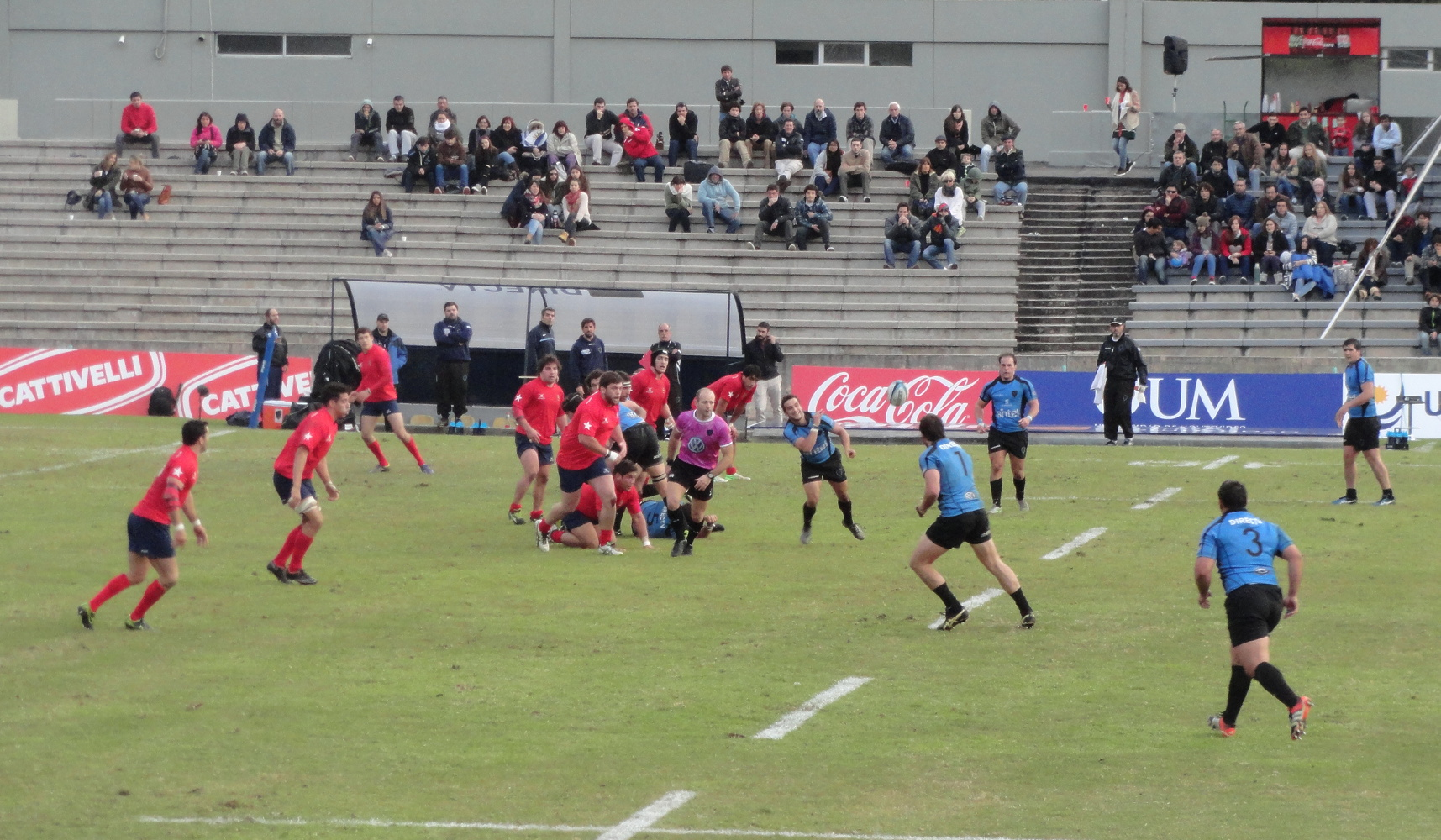
Chile playing against Los Teros at the 2016 South American Rugby Championship "A".

In 2010, Chile nearly started the new decade with a bang, coming very close to defeating Oceania powerhouse Tonga, but losing 32–30. The following year in 2011, Chile beat Uruguay for the first time in nine years, winning 21–18 and finishing second in the South American Championship.

The decade has been marked by inconsistency in results. In 2013, Chile began their qualifying campaign, opening up with a victory versus Brazil, but yet again lost to foes Uruguay, following the same pattern of results since the 1999 campaign. In 2014, Chile reached a bottom point; in the 2014 South American Championship, they finished bottom of the group, losing to Brazil for the first time in their history. Chile were also wooden spooners in the 2014 CONSUR Cup, the new competition featuring Argentina and the top 2 sides in South America. However, the following year, Chile won the South American Championship for the first time in their history, cruising through both Brazil and Paraguay before defeating Uruguay at home 30–15.

In 2016, Chile participated in the first Americas Rugby Championship in its current format. Chile squeaked a home win versus Brazil, before playing a close game against Argentina before tiring out in the last 20 minutes, ultimately losing 52–15. Chile were blown out by the United States in Fort Lauderdale 64–0 before nearly beating Uruguay, losing 20–23. Chile lost their last game at home versus Canada, 64–13, finishing bottom in the inaugural edition.

In the 2017 Americas Rugby Championship, Chile was defeated in all five matches, scoring just four tries in the tournament. In the 2017 Cup of Nations, the team claimed a win over Kenya, while losing to Russia and Hong Kong.

=== 2020s: World Cup ===
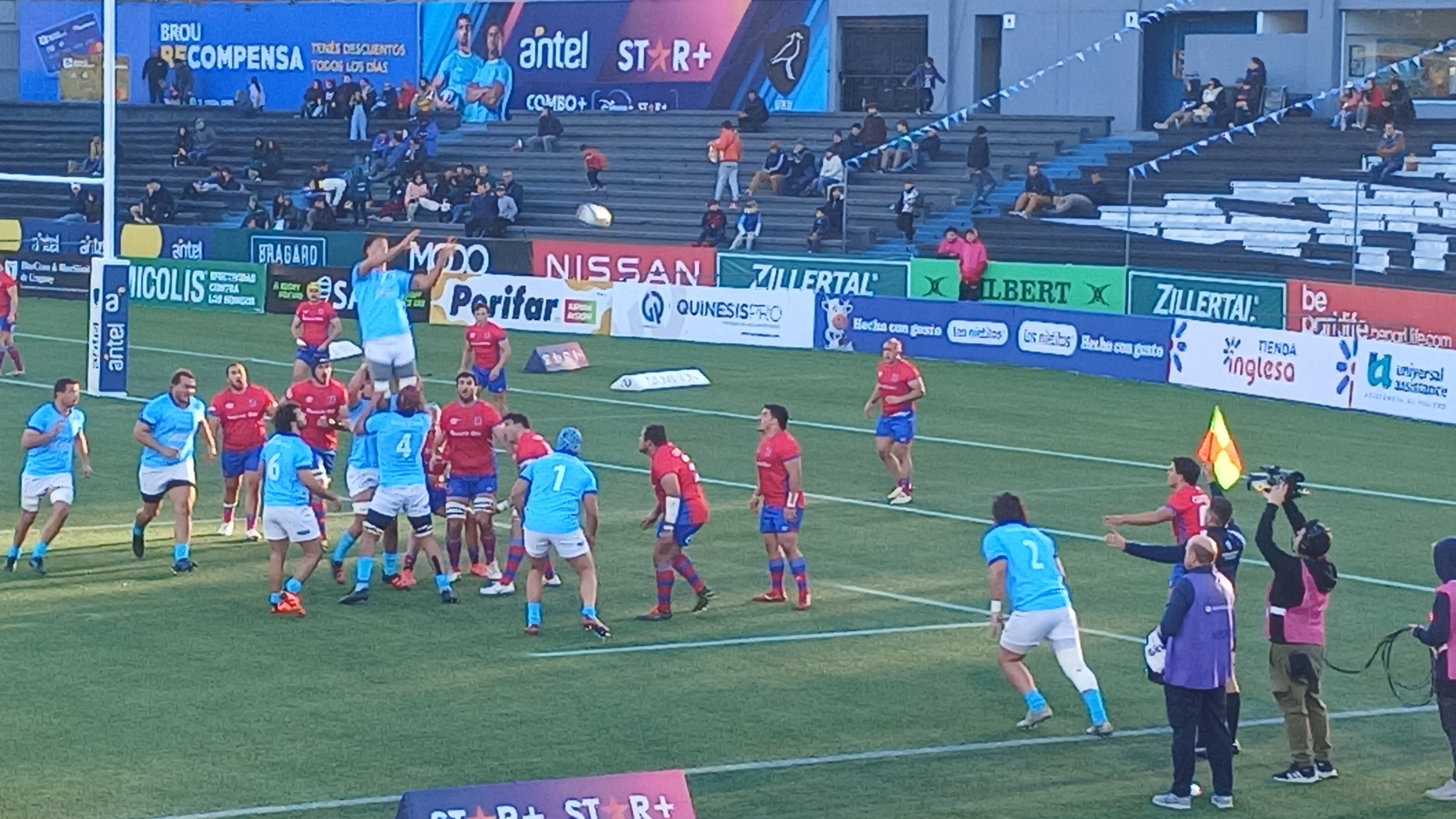
Chile playing a test match against Los Teros before the 2023 Rugby World Cup.

Going into the 2020s Chile finally looked to have turned a corner after having successfully come through the first rounds of South America qualification for the 2023 RWC, they went into the Americas 2 Repechage with strong chances of upsetting a weakened Canada side. In a two-legged play-off Chile held Canada to a tight 22-21 opener at Langford, British Columbia before overcoming 33-24 in Valparaíso, winning 54-46 on aggregate and booking their place in the Americas 2 qualifier v the USA. It was also their first ever win over Canada at the 8th attempt and one of their biggest scalps yet.

In July 2022 Chile qualified for the Rugby World Cup for the first time. They secured their place with an aggregate 52–51 win over the United States, overturning a one-point deficit in the first leg with a 31–29 win in Glendale, Colorado.

== Record ==
=== Overall record ===
Men's World Rugby Rankings Top 30 as of 16 November 2026
Rank	Change (Note: Change from the previous week)	Team	Points
1	Steady	South Africa	91.53
2	Steady	New Zealand	90.65
3	▲1	France	89.05
4	▼1	Ireland	88.70
5	Steady	England	86.99
6	Steady	Scotland	85.28
7	Steady	Australia	82.24
8	Steady	Argentina	82.09
9	▲1	Wales	79.37
10	▼1	Fiji	77.79
11	Steady	Italy	75.84
12	Steady	Japan	75.25
13	Steady	Georgia	74.23
14	▲1	United States	68.39
15	▼1	Portugal	68.24
16	▲3	Samoa	67.60
17	▲1	Chile	67.00
18	▼2	Spain	66.53
19	▼2	Tonga	65.58
20	Steady	Uruguay	65.17
21	Steady	Canada	63.38
22	Steady	Belgium	62.00
23	Steady	Romania	61.13
24	Steady	Hong Kong	58.46
25	Steady	Zimbabwe	57.71
26	Steady	Netherlands	56.44
27	Steady	Namibia	56.03
28	Steady	Switzerland	55.47
29	Steady	Czech Republic	55.42
30	Steady	Poland	54.54

Chile's historical rankings

Source: World Rugby
Graph updated to 16 November 2026

Below is a table of the representative rugby matches played by a Chile national XV at test level up until 21 November 2026, updated after match with Zimbabwe.

Opponent	Played	Won	Lost	Drawn	Win %	For	Aga	Diff
Argentina	38	0	38	0	0.00%	242	1,686	−1,444
Argentina XV	17	2	15	0	12.5%	178	593	−415
Argentina Provinces	3	2	1	0	66.67%	115	67	+48
Belgium	1	1	0	0	100%	33	5	+28
Bermuda	1	1	0	0	100%	65	8	+57
Brazil	32	25	5	2	78.13%	1,106	468	+638
Canada	9	2	7	0	22.22%	160	305	−145
England	1	0	1	0	0.00%	0	71	−71
England Counties XV	1	0	1	0	0.00%	21	33	−12
Fiji	1	0	1	0	0.00%	16	41	−25
France Amateur	1	0	1	0	0.00%	3	22	−19
France XV	2	0	2	0	0.00%	9	89	−80
Georgia	3	1	2	0	33.33%	58	102	−44
Germany	1	1	0	0	100%	32	10	+22
Hong Kong	3	2	1	0	66.67%	66	47	+19
Ireland XV	1	0	1	0	0.00%	0	30	−30
Italy	1	0	1	0	0.00%	19	34	−15
Italy A	1	0	1	0	0.00%	26	33	−7
Japan	1	0	1	0	0.00%	12	42	−30
Junior Springboks	3	0	3	0	0.00%	13	165	−152
Kenya	1	1	0	0	100%	23	3	+20
Māori All Blacks	1	0	1	0	0.00%	0	73	−73
Namibia	1	0	1	0	0.00%	26	28	−2
Netherlands	1	0	1	0	0.00%	17	20	−3
New Zealand XV	1	0	1	0	0.00%	6	34	−28
Oxford and Cambridge	1	0	1	0	0.00%	6	42	−36
Paraguay	30	29	1	0	96.67%	1312	286	+1026
Peru	2	2	0	0	100%	62	6	+56
Portugal	5	0	5	0	0.00%	82	146	−64
Romania	4	2	2	0	50%	122	104	+18
Russia	3	2	1	0	66.67%	83	98	−15
Samoa	3	1	1	1	33.33%	73	87	−14
Scotland	1	0	1	0	0.00%	11	52	−41
Scotland A	2	0	2	0	0.00%	22	64	−42
South Africa XV	3	0	3	0	0.00%	16	188	−172
South African Country Districts XV	1	0	1	0	0.00%	18	63	−45
Sudamérica XV	1	0	1	0	0.00%	21	38	−17
South Korea	2	1	1	0	50%	66	50	+16
Spain	7	3	4	0	42.86%	133	200	−67
Tonga	2	0	2	0	0.00%	40	71	−31
Trinidad and Tobago	1	1	0	0	100%	35	6	+29
United States	8	2	6	0	25%	125	336	−211
Uruguay	57	13	43	1	22.81%	76	125	−49
Uruguay A	3	1	2	0	33.33%	59	101	−42
Venezuela	1	1	0	0	100%	95	3	+92
Zimbabwe	1	1	0	0	100%	34	29	+5
Total	264	97	163	4	36.74%	4,755	6,112	−1,357

=== World Cup record ===
Rugby World Cup record									Qualification						
Year	Round	Pld	W	D	L	PF	PA	Squad	Pos	Pld	W	D	L	PF	PA
(New Zealand) (Australia) 1987	Not invited								Not invited						
(England) (France) (Ireland) (Scotland) (Wales) 1991	Did not enter								Did not enter						
(South Africa) 1995	Did not qualify								4th	3	0	0	3	37	109
(Wales) 1999	Did not qualify								2nd	4	3	0	1	168	40
(Australia) 2003	Did not qualify								4th	8	4	0	4	196	155
(France) 2007	Did not qualify								3rd	4	2	0	2	121	138
(New Zealand) 2011	Did not qualify								2nd	2	1	0	1	88	49
(England) 2015	Did not qualify								2nd	4	2	0	2	92	78
(Japan) 2019	Did not qualify								2nd	6	3	1	2	194	110
(France) 2023	Pool stage	4	0	0	4	27	215	Squad	P/O	6	3	0	3	139	125
(Australia) 2027	Qualified								P/O	8	6	1	1	270	141
(United States) 2031	To be determined								To be determined						
Total	—	4	0	0	4	27	215	—	—	45	24	2	19	1305	945
Champions; Runners–up; Third place; Fourth place; Home venue

=== South American Rugby Championship record ===
- 1951 – Runners-up
- 1958 – Runners-up
- 1961 – Runners-up
- 1964 – Fourth place
- 1967 – Runners-up
- 1969 – Runners-up
- 1971 – Runners-up
- 1973 – Third place
- 1975 – Runners-up
- 1977 – Third place
- 1979 – Runners-up
- 1981 – Runners-up
- 1983 – Third place
- 1985 – Third place
- 1987 – Third place
- 1989 – Third place
- 1991 – Third place
- 1993 – Fourth place
- 1995 – Third place
- 1997 – Third place
- 1998 – Third place
- 2000 – Third place
- 2001 – Third place
- 2002 – Third place
- 2003 – Third place
- 2004 – Third place
- 2005 – Third place
- 2006 – Third place
- 2007 – Third place
- 2008 – Third place
- 2009 – Third place
- 2010 – Third place
- 2011 – Runners-up
- 2012 – Third place
- 2013 – Third place
- 2014 – Fourth place
- 2015 – First place
- 2016 – Runners-up
- 2017 – Runners-up
- 2018 – Third place
- 2019 – Third place
- 2020 – Runners-up
- 2025 – Runners-up

=== Sudamérica Rugby Cup/CONSUR Cup record ===
- 2014 – Third place
- 2015 – Did not participate
- 2016 – Third place
- 2017 – Third place

=== Americas Rugby Championship record ===
- 2016 – Sixth place
- 2017 – Sixth place
- 2018 – Sixth place
- 2019 – Sixth place
- 2026 – Champions

=== Nations Cup record ===
- 2026 – TBD

== Players ==
=== Current squad ===
On 27 October, Chile named a 31-player squad ahead of the 2026 World Rugby Nations Cup European-African-Asian Series.

Head Coach: (Uruguay) Pablo Lemoine

- Caps updated: 14 November 2026 (after Spain v Chile)

Player	Position	Date of birth (age)	Caps	Club/province
Norman Aguayo	Hooker	12 February 2002 (age 24)	7	(Chile) Selknam
Augusto Böhme	Hooker	11 June 1997 (age 29)	36	(Chile) Selknam
Diego Escobar	Hooker	17 April 2000 (age 26)	26	(France) Racing 92
Matías Dittus	Prop	16 July 1993 (age 33)	41	(France) CSA Rugby Annonay
Iñaki Gurruchaga	Prop	13 October 1995 (age 31)	32	(Chile) Selknam
Vittorio Lastra	Prop	16 March 1996 (age 30)	26	(France) Mont-de-Marsan
Benjamín Moreno	Prop	20 January 2005 (age 21)	1	(Chile) DOBS
Javier Eissmann	Lock	21 March 1997 (age 29)	40	(France) Agen
Pharel Munoz	Lock	21 April 2004 (age 22)	0	(France) SC Royannais
Santiago Pedrero	Lock	30 November 2000 (age 25)	29	(Chile) Selknam
Bruno Sáez	Lock	27 October 2004 (age 22)	15	(Chile) Selknam
Alfonso Escobar	Back row	17 August 1997 (age 29)	36	(Chile) Selknam
Raimundo Martínez	Back row	25 November 1999 (age 26)	32	(Chile) Selknam
Joaquín Milesi	Back row	26 January 2001 (age 25)	8	(Chile) PWCC
Clemente Saavedra	Back row	15 December 1997 (age 28)	41	(Chile) Selknam
Ernesto Tchimino	Back row	21 March 2001 (age 25)	16	(Chile) Selknam
Ignaco Valdes	Back row	21 May 2008 (age 18)	0	(France) Bayonne
Lucas Berti	Scrum-half	12 December 2003 (age 22)	13	(France) Grenoble
Marcelo Torrealba	Scrum-half	6 May 1996 (age 30)	25	(Chile) Selknam
Benjamín Videla	Scrum-half	21 April 2001 (age 25)	15	(Chile) Selknam
Rodrigo Fernández	Fly-half	8 February 1996 (age 30)	42	(Chile) Selknam
Felipe Mendez	Fly-half	19 April 2001 (age 25)	1	(Chile) Selknam
Juan Cruz Reyes	Fly-half	4 July 2003 (age 23)	12	(Chile) Selknam
Matías Garafulic	Centre	1 September 2000 (age 26)	31	(Chile) Selknam
Nicolás Saab	Centre	28 February 2005 (age 21)	13	(Chile) Selknam
Domingo Saavedra	Centre	15 December 1997 (age 28)	38	(Chile) Selknam
Santiago Videla	Centre	16 January 1998 (age 28)	45	(United States) Chicago Hounds
Marco Alvano	Wing	23 October 2006 (age 20)	1	(Chile) Old Boys
Clemente Armstrong	Wing	29 May 2001 (age 25)	6	(Chile) Selknam
Manuel Bustamante	Wing	13 January 2003 (age 23)	5	(Chile) Selknam
Iñaki Ayarza	Fullback	7 September 1999 (age 27)	29	(France) Oyonnax

=== Notable players ===
- Donald Campbell
- Ian Campbell
- Alastair MacGregor Martin
- Cristian Onetto
- José Larenas
- Sergio Valdes
- Francisco Planella

=== Award winners ===
The following Chile players have been recognised at the World Rugby Awards since 2001:

World Rugby Try of the Year
Year	Date	Scorer	Match	Tournament	Ref
2022	9 July	Rodrigo Fernández	vs. United States	World Cup Qualifiers	
2025	20 September	Santiago Pedrero	vs. Samoa	World Cup Qualifiers	

== Player records ==
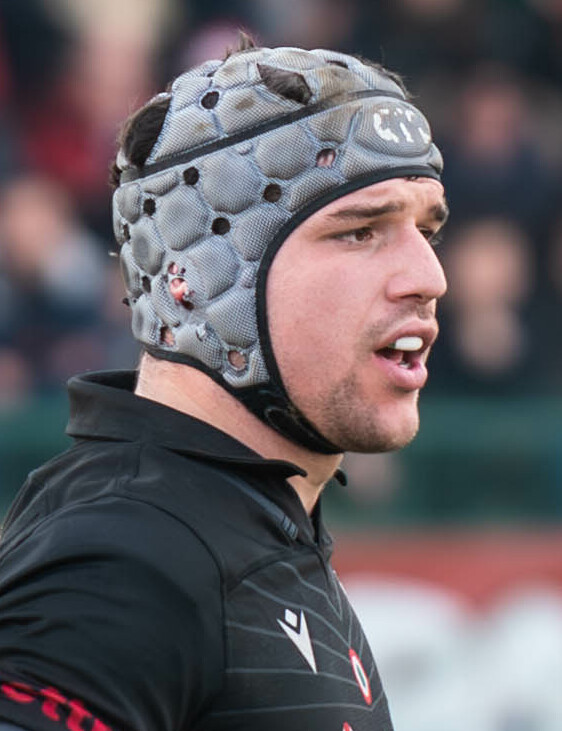
Rodrigo Fernández is the Chilean active player with most tries scored.

=== Most caps ===
Most capped players
Rank	Name	Years	Games
1	José Larenas	2012–2023	50
2	Benjamin Madrigal	2012–2019	43
3	Tomás Dussaillant	2016–2023	40
4	Ignacio Silva	2010–2023	38
5	Martín Sigren	2016–2024	37
6	Santiago Videla	2017–2025	36
7	Ignacio Aninat	2010–2021	34
7	José Williams	2012–2019	34
9	Nikola Bursic	2013–2021	30
10	Beltrán Sandoval	2016–2019	29

=== Most points ===
Most points scored
Rank	Name	Years	Points
1	Santiago Videla	2017–2025	278
2	Javier Valderrama	2008–2015	239
3	Tomás Vergara	2016–2019	130
4	Matías Torrico	2014–2017	104
5	Francisco Moller	2011–2019	73
6	Rodrigo Fernández	2016–2025	57
7	José Larenas	2012–2023	55
8	Italo Peñaloza	2014–2018	40
9	Nicolás Garafulic	2019–2025	35
9	Benjamín Madrigal	2012–2019	35

Most tries scored
Rank	Name	Years	Tries
1	José Larenas	2012–2023	11
2	Rodrigo Fernández	2016–2025	10
3	Santiago Videla	2017–2025	9
4	Italo Peñaloza	2014–2018	8
4	Felipe Valdivia	2010–2017	8
6	Nicolás Garafulic	2019–2025	7
6	Benjamin Madrigal	2012–2019	7
6	Tomás Vergara	2016–2019	7
9	Matias Garafulic	2021–2025	6
10	Julio Blanc	2019	5

== Past coaches ==
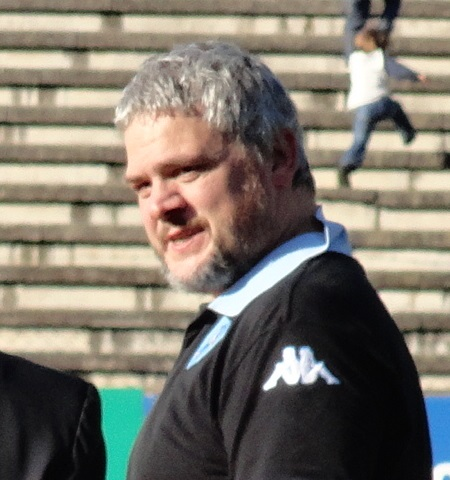
Lemoine was the first coach in qualify with Chile to the Rugby World Cup.

=== Current managerial staff ===
Position	Name
Head Coach	(Uruguay) Pablo Lemoine
Assistant Coach	(New Zealand) Jake Mangin
Coach	(Argentina) Federico Todeschini
Coach	(Argentina) Nicolás Bruzzone
Coach	(Chile) Ricardo Cortés

=== Chronology of head coaches ===
Since the 1999 Rugby World Cup

Years	Coach
2002–2006	(Argentina) Jorge Navesi
2007	(Chile) Cristian Iga
2007	(Argentina) Gonzolo Balbontin
2008–2012	(Argentina) Daniel Graco
2012–2014	(Argentina) Omar Turcumán
2014–2015	(Australia) Paul Healy
2016	(Chile) Elías Santillán (interim)
2016–2017	(France) Bernard Charreyre
2017	(Argentina) Omar Turcuman
2017–2018	(New Zealand) Mark Cross
2018–present	(Uruguay) Pablo Lemoine

== Jersey colours ==
The Chile national team wears a combination of red, white and blue as its official colors. For the 2021 and 2022 season, the home jersey is styled in red to represent the Andean condor which appears on the team's crest. Blue is used for collar, sleeves, shorts and striped socks.

For their home away shirt, the jersey's color is white with blue and red trims and feature the same graphic pattern and condor as the home design. The white socks are also adorned with all three colors.

=== Sponsors ===
The following companies are the main sponsors of the Chilean team.

==== Main sponsors ====
- (Ecuador) Marathon Sports
- Banco de Chile

==== Partners ====
- (Chile) Sodimac
- (Chile) Copec
- (United States) Burger King

- (Chile) Kunstmann
- (Argentina) Fernet Branca
- (Argentina) Universal Assistance
- (Chile) Energy Club

== See also ==
- Rugby union in Chile
- Chilean Rugby Federation
- Chile national rugby sevens team
- Chile national under-20 rugby union team
- Selknam
- South American Jaguars
- Sport in Chile
