= Colombia national rugby union team =

Colombia
- Nickname: Los Tucanes
- Union: Colombian Rugby Federation
- Head coach: Luis Pedro Achard
First colours	Second colours

World Rugby ranking
- Current: 43 (as of 14 April 2025)
- Highest: 33 (2021)

First international
- Mexico 46 - 10 Colombia (1996-01-08)

Biggest win
- Colombia 136–0 Costa Rica (Medellín, Colombia; 25 September 2024)

Biggest defeat
- Colombia 3-79 Argentina XV (2019-05-11); Biggest defeat by full international Brazil 74 - 0 Colombia (2004-10-13)

The Colombia national rugby union team is classified as a tier-three nation by World Rugby. They have thus far not qualified for a Rugby World Cup, but have participated in qualifying tournaments. Colombia made their debut against Mexico in 1996. In 2018, the Colombians won their first significant international honour, winning the inaugural Americas Rugby Challenge, the 'B' championship to the Americas Rugby Championship.

The national side is ranked 43rd in the world (as of 14 April 2025).

The team is called Los Tucanes.

== History ==
Colombia attempted to qualify for the 2003 Rugby World Cup in Australia, participating in the Americas qualifying tournaments during November 2001. They contested matches in the Round 1 (South) group, against nations including Brazil, Venezuela and Peru in Round 1.

Colombia was involved in qualifying for the World Cup (France 2007) in 2004 when they contested Round 1b (CONSUR 2nd division). They finished fourth in the final standings which knocked them out of contention, though their fixtures against Peru and Venezuela were close, losing 15-10 and 27-31 respectively.

Rugby has little support by the government or media, as football has a stronger tradition in the country.

The team has competed in the B Division of the South American Rugby Championship since its second edition in 2001. It won the competition in 2009, and again, three times in a row in 2014, 2015 and 2016. However, there is no direct promotion to the A Division; to win promotion it must beat the lowest-place team in the A Division in a playoff.

In an attempt to qualify for the 2019 edition of the Rugby World Cup, Colombia showed some progress. Colombia easily beat Ecuador 75-5 then went on to defeat Peru 41-14 and Venezuela 35-10 progressing the team to the next round. This involved Colombia playing Mexico in a Pan-American qualifier, which Colombia won 29-11. Colombia's final qualifying match was played against Paraguay, who had come in last place in 2015 South American championship Division A. Colombia gallantly lost this match 39-27.

After winning Sudamericano B three times in a row (Apartadó 2014, Lima 2015 and Lima 2016), Sudamérica Rugby promoted Colombia to the top tier of South America, alongside Uruguay, Chile, Brazil and Paraguay, to start in 2018. The competition changed its format, and a South American Six Nations was played in May 2018. This tournament included the Top 5 teams of South America and Argentina XV. Colombia will have another important competition each year, and it will be Americas Rugby Championship B. This new competition will be structured as the second tier competition of the Americas, after Americas Rugby Championship. Paraguay, Colombia, Mexico and Trinidad and Tobago will play it on a yearly basis.

Luis Pedro Achard was appointed to oversee the men's and women's national teams in 2024.

== Records ==
=== Overall ===
Below is a table of the representative rugby matches played by a Colombia national XV at test level up until 8 November 2025, updated after match with Mexico.

Opponent	Played	Won	Lost	Drawn	% Won
Brazil	12	0	12	0	0%
Cayman Islands	1	1	0	0	100%
Chile	1	0	1	0	0%
Costa Rica	5	5	0	0	100%
Ecuador	3	3	0	0	100%
Guyana	1	1	0	0	100%
Mexico	7	5	1	1	71.43%
Paraguay	13	3	10	0	23.08%
Peru	18	10	8	0	55.56%
Venezuela	23	15	8	0	65.22%
Total	84	43	40	1	51.19%

== Current squad ==
The following squad was selected to play the 2015 South American Rugby Championship repechage against Brazil.

Head Coach: Raul Vesga

- Jaider Pemberthy Muñoz (Antioquia)
- Manuel Correa Quintana (Antioquia)
- Emanuel Mendoza Mosquera (Antioquia)
- Andrés Quintero Espinosa (Antioquia)
- Jhoann Mantilla (Santander)
- Gerson Ortiz Cañas (Antioquia)
- Ferney Rodríguez (Antioquia)
- Sebastían Mejía Gil (Antioquia) (c)
- Jeferson Borja Restrepo (Antioquia)
- Emmanuel Bedoya Pulgarín (Antioquia)
- Pablo Lemoine Arboleda (Bogotá)
- Camilo Cadavid Cardona (Antioquia)
- Brayan Campino Riascos (Valle)
- Dani Giraldo Mesa (Antioquia)
- Jhon Urrutia (Antioquia)
- Vásques Eduardo Montoya (Antioquia)
- Mauricio Espinal Vargas (Antioquia)
- Juan Gabriel Dávila Metaute (Antioquia)
- Andrés Tarazona (Lyon OU)
- Andrés Echeverri (Antioquia)

== Coaches ==
Name	Years
Raul Vesga	?–2023
Luis Pedro Achard	2024–

== See also ==
- Colombia national rugby sevens team
- Rugby union in Colombia
- Sports in Colombia
