= Peru national rugby union team =

Peru
- Nickname: Los Tumis
- Union: Peruvian Rugby Federation
- Head coach: Pablo Vila
First colours	Second colours

World Rugby ranking
- Current: 80 (as of 4 November 2024)
- Highest: 72
- Lowest: 80 (4 November 2024)

First international
- Argentina 44–0 Peru (Santiago, Chile; 11 October 1958)

Biggest win
- Peru 65–5 Ecuador (Lima, Peru; 8 October 2016)

Biggest defeat
- Paraguay 74–0 Peru (São Paulo, Brazil; 10 October 2004)

The Peru national rugby team, nicknamed los Tumis, is an emerging team in the Americas and a member of the Sudamérica Rugby.

The national side is ranked 80th in the world, as of 4 November 2024.

== History ==
In 1958 Peru, together with Argentina, Uruguay and Chile participated in the first South American tournament, held in Santiago, Chile. Because there was no IRB-sanctioned rugby union at the time, participation was not officially accepted by Peruvian sport authorities. It would be another 39 years before the Union Peruana de Rugby was formed.

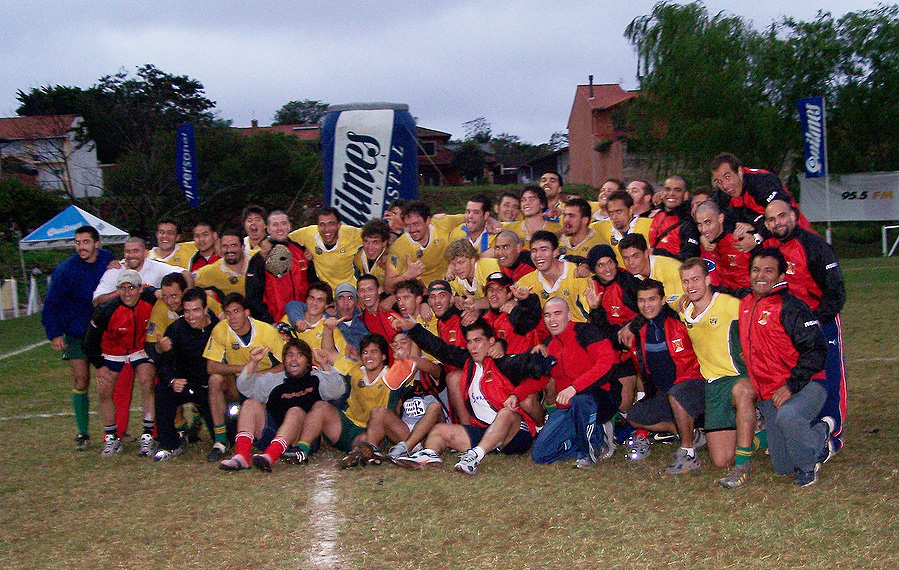
Brazil and Peru's national rugby union teams

In September 1999 Peru participated in its first official international tournament: the first under-21 South American tournament in Asunción, Paraguay.

In November 2000 Peru participated in the first South American B Championship, in São Paulo, Brazil, with Brazil and Venezuela.

In 2001 they played in the qualifying rounds of the 2003 Rugby World Cup, against Brazil, Venezuela, and Colombia. Their home tie with Colombia was the first Peruvian victory on home soil in an official IRB match.

In the 2007 South American B Championship, played in Peru, Los Tumis won second place. Brazil were champions, with Colombia and Venezuela finishing third and fourth, respectively.

In 2010 Peru won the South American B Championship played in Medellín, Colombia, gaining their first international title.

== Records ==
=== Overall ===
Below is a table of the representative rugby matches played by a Peru national XV at test level up until 21 November 2026, updated after match with Cayman Islands.

Opponent	Played	Won	Lost	Drawn	% Won
Argentina	1	0	1	0	0%
Brazil	9	0	9	0	0%
Cayman Islands	1	0	1	0	0%
Chile	2	0	2	0	0%
Colombia	18	8	10	0	44.44%
Costa Rica	7	7	0	0	100%
Ecuador	5	5	0	0	100%
Guatemala	1	1	0	0	100%
Paraguay	5	0	5	0	0%
Uruguay	1	0	1	0	0%
Venezuela	18	6	12	0	33.33%
Total	68	27	41	0	39.71%

== Current squad ==
Squad to 2018 South American B Championship

- Head Coach: (Peru) Pablo Vila

Player	Club
Aita Falconi, Luis	(Peru) Lima Rugby Club - Universidad de Lima
Armas, Carlos	(Peru) Alumni Rugby Club
Aysanoa, Isaías	(Peru) Navy Warriors
Barrio de Mendoza, Lucas	(Peru) Navy Warriors
Bauza, Jonathan	(Peru) Flaming Lions Rugby Football Club / Newton - UPC
Carnero, Joshua	(Peru) Alumni Rugby Club
Del Pino, Juan Pablo	(Argentina) Univ. Católica de Córdoba
Deustua, Francisco	(Peru) Flaming Lions Rugby Football Club / Newton - UPC
Escanes, Gustavo	(Argentina) Palermo Bajo
Fotinias, Thanasis	(Peru) Flaming Lions Rugby Football Club / Newton - UPC
Gómez, Adrián	(Peru) Navy Warriors
Herrera, Christian	(Peru) Leones de San Marcos
Mayorga, Arnold	(Peru) Lima Rugby Club - Universidad de Lima
Medina, Diego	(Peru) Navy Warriors
Monier, Luis	(Peru) Lima Rugby Club - Universidad de Lima
Ramírez, Rodrigo	(Peru) Navy Warriors
Ríos Valles, Luis	(Peru) Leones de San Marcos
Salazar, Edu	(Peru) Lima Rugby Club - Universidad de Lima
Santome, Christian	(Peru) Navy Warriors
Socualaya, Emerson	(Peru) Leones de San Marcos
Soria, José	(Peru) Flaming Lions Rugby Football Club / Newton - UPC
Suárez, Felipe	(Peru) Flaming Lions Rugby Football Club / Newton - UPC
Tejeda, Luis	(Peru) Lima Rugby Club - Universidad de Lima
Tello, Joaquín	(Peru) Alumni Rugby Club
Terrones, Eduardo	(Peru) Leones de San Marcos
Velarde-Álvarez, Sebastián	(Peru) Lima Rugby Club - Universidad de Lima

== See also ==
- Rugby union in Peru
- Unión Peruana de Rugby
