= Venezuela national rugby union team =

Venezuela
- Nickname: Las Orquídeas
- Union: Venezuelan Rugby Federation
- Head coach: Harry Ramos
First colours	Second colours

World Rugby ranking
- Current: 75 (as of 4 November 2024)
- Highest: 75 (2024)
- Lowest: 79 (2024)

First international
- Trinidad and Tobago 26–23 Venezuela (1998-07-01)

Biggest win
- Venezuela 70–0 Costa Rica (2006-10-14)

Biggest defeat
- Argentina 147–7 Venezuela (2004-05-01)

The Venezuela national rugby union team is classified as a third-tier rugby playing nation. They joined the then, IRB, in 1998. They entered the Rugby World Cup qualification matches for the 2003 and 2007 Rugby World Cup's, but were twice eliminated by Brazil.

== Coaches ==
- Rex Lawrence
- Carlos de Pascual
- José Queirel
- Graciano Molina
- Gustavo López (since July 2012)
- Mario Urdaneta
- Carlos Caraza
- Harry Ramos

== Rugby World Cup qualification ==
- 1987 - Did not enter
- 1991 - Did not enter
- 1995 - Did not enter
- 1999 - Did not enter
- 2003 - Did not qualify
- 2007 - Did not qualify
- 2011 - Did not qualify
- 2015 - Did not qualify
- 2019 - Did not qualify

== Overall ==
Below is a table of the representative rugby matches played by a Venezuela national XV at test level up until 29 September 2024, updated after match with Colombia.

Opponent	Played	Won	Lost	Drawn	% Won
Argentina	1	0	1	0	0%
Brazil	9	1	8	0	11.11%
Chile	1	0	1	0	0%
Chile A	1	0	1	0	0%
Colombia	23	8	0	15	34.78%
Costa Rica	4	4	0	0	100%
Ecuador	3	3	0	0	100%
Paraguay	4	0	4	0	0%
Peru	20	13	7	0	65%
Trinidad and Tobago	3	0	3	0	0%
Uruguay	1	0	1	0	0%
Total	70	29	41	0	41.43%

== See also ==
- Rugby union in Venezuela
- Venezuela national rugby sevens team
- Venezuela women's national rugby sevens team

== Sources ==
- (in Spanish) feverugby.com - Official Site
