= Paraguay national rugby union team =

Paraguay
- Nickname: Los Yacares (The Alligators)
- Union: Unión de Rugby del Paraguay
- Head coach: (Argentina) Juan Ávila
- Top scorer: Gerard Cuttier
First colours	Second colours

World Rugby ranking
- Current: 31 (as of 19 June 2026)
- Lowest: 46 (23 November 2020)

First international
- Paraguay 3–21 Brazil (Asunción, Paraguay; 5 September 1970)

Biggest win
- Paraguay 109–0 Bolivia (Asunción, Paraguay; 20 September 2019)

Biggest defeat
- Argentina 152–0 Paraguay (Mendoza, Argentina; 1 May 2002)

World Cup
- Appearances: 0

The Paraguay national rugby team is governed by the Paraguayan Rugby Union. They compete regularly in the South American Rugby Championship, but have yet to qualify for the Rugby World Cup.

Paraguay had the unenviable position on 1 May 2002, of being beaten by Argentina by 152–0. In July of the same year, Japan beat Taiwan by an identical margin – 155–3, but unlike Paraguay, Taiwan scored some points in their match.

In the past Paraguay was regularly the 4th team in South American rugby, behind Argentina, Uruguay and Chile. However, in the late 2000s, at both Junior and Senior Levels, Brazil came to compete with and beat Paraguay, relegating Paraguay to 5th place in South America.

== Paraguay in South American Rugby ==
With the formation of the Unión de Rugby del Paraguay in 1970, the national team, Los Yacarés (the Alligators), first represented Paraguay in 1971.

In the Sudamericano (South American Championship) of 1971 they lost to Chile, Uruguay and Argentina by between 40 and 60 points, while losing a close game to Brazil, 12–6. This established the pattern which has continued ever since, with Paraguay lagging behind Argentina, Uruguay and Chile, and sharing 4th and 5th place in South America with Brazil.

In 1981, in the absence of Argentina, Paraguay finished 3rd in the Sudamericano.

In 1985 Paraguay drew 9 all with Uruguay, their only draw with Uruguay at senior level, and lost to Chile by only 3 points, 19–12. Despite the draw, Paraguay still finished in 4th place in the Sudamericano on points difference, due to a heavy loss to Argentina and Uruguay beating Chile.

In 1993 Paraguay managed to beat Chile 25–24 in Santiago for the first and only time at senior level, finishing 3rd in the Sudamericano.

Until 2003 Paraguay regularly played in the Sudamericano de Rugby A (the first division of the South American rugby championship). However, in 2003 they suffered huge losses, 144–0 to Argentina, 53–7 to Uruguay and 102–0 to Chile.

For 2004 Paraguay was replaced in the A by Venezuela, the B Champion from 2003 (who also suffered huge losses). Paraguay won the B championship in both 2004 and 2005, winning the decider against Brazil in 2005 by 45–8.

In 2006 and 2007 Paraguay did not play any test matches. They were too good for the Sudamericano B, but not strong enough to compete in the Sudamericano A.

Paraguay returned to international rugby in 2008 in the Sudamericano B played in Asuncion. The Championship also served as 2011 Rugby World Cup qualification. Both Paraguay and Brazil had strong wins against Colombia, Venezuela and Peru. Brazil won the championship decider 15–6, the first time they had beaten Paraguay since 1989. In doing so they also moved above Paraguay in the IRB World Rankings for the first time, a position they have maintained ever since.

Based on their similar results, CONSUR decided to promoted both Brazil and Paraguay to the Sudamericano A for 2009. In 2009 and 2010 Paraguay and Brazil lost to Chile and Uruguay in the Sudamericano A, and Brazil won the matches between the two countries 36–21 and 24–18.

In the 2011 Sudamericano A, Paraguay sent a very inexperienced team to the Championship, after infighting in the Union de Rugby del Paraguay saw the country's top 3 teams (who had formed the majority of players in the national team) withdrawing their players. The team suffered huge losses, 102–6 against Uruguay, 71–3 against Chile, and a record 51–14 against Brazil.

Paraguay was relegated to the Sudamericano B for 2012. In 2012 Paraguay won the Sudamericano B (which also served as a Rugby World Cup Qualifier) easily, with a combined score of 196 to 28, against Colombia, Venezuela and Peru.

Paraguay played further World Cup Qualifiers in late 2012, beating Bermuda 29–14 and losing to Brazil 35–22.

In 2013 Paraguay again won the Sudemaericano B, by a closer margin, beating Peru 22–0, Venezuela 48–7 and Colombia 25–15.

Paraguayan rugby continues to face the same problem, that it is generally not strong enough to compete with the other teams in the Sudamericano A, but is too strong for the teams in the Sudamericano B.

== Overall Record ==
Statistics approved by World Rugby:

Below is a table of the representative rugby matches played by a Paraguay national XV at test level up until 6 September 2026, updated after match with Uruguay XV.

Opponent	Played	Won	Lost	Drawn	Win %	Best Result
Argentina	18	0	18	0	0%	10 - 37
Argentina XV	2	0	2	0	0%	11 - 58
Australia A	1	0	1	0	0%	9 - 44
Belgium	1	0	1	0	0%	20 - 45
Bermuda	1	1	0	0	100%	29 - 14
Bolivia	1	1	0	0	100%	109 - 0
Brazil	33	13	20	0	39.39%	57 - 8
Cayman Islands	1	1	0	0	100%	57 - 7
Chile	30	1	29	0	3.33%	25 - 24
Chile XV	4	2	2	0	50%	43 - 24
Colombia	13	10	3	0	76.92%	82 - 8
Fiji Barbarians	1	0	1	0	0%	0 - 104
France A	1	0	1	0	0%	12 - 106
Guyana	1	1	0	0	100%	86 - 7
Hong Kong	1	0	1	0	0%	12 - 80
Mexico	2	1	1	0	50%	45 - 36
Peru	5	5	0	0	100%	74 - 0
South Africa A	1	0	1	0	0%	6 - 84
Sudamérica XV	1	0	1	0	0%	22 - 73
Uruguay	28	0	27	1	0%	9 - 9
Uruguay XV	1	0	1	0	0%	12 - 41
Venezuela	4	4	0	0	100%	94 - 7
Total	151	41	109	1	27.15%	—N/a

== South American Rugby Championships ==
Sudamericano 1971 Montevideo, Uruguay

10 OCT 1971 Uruguay 56 – 3 Paraguay

14 OCT 1971 Chile 40 – 0 Paraguay

16 OCT 1971 Argentina 61 – 0 Paraguay

17 OCT 1971 Brasil 12 – 6 Paraguay

5th Place

Sudamericano 1973 San Pablo, Brasil

14 OCT 1973 Argentina 98 – 3 Paraguay

18 OCT 1973 Chile 27 – 3 Paraguay

20 OCT 1973 Uruguay 31 – 9 Paraguay

21 OCT 1973 Brasil 22 – 3 Paraguay

5th Place

Sudamericano 1975 Asunción, Paraguay

21 SEP 1975 Paraguay 6 – 19 Brasil

23 SEP 1975 Paraguay 3 – 44 Chile

25 SEP 1975 Argentina 93 – 0 Paraguay

28 SEP 1975 Paraguay 18 – 38 Uruguay

5th Place

Sudamericano 1977 Tucumán, Argentina

23 OCT 1977 Chile 22 – 3 Paraguay

24 OCT 1977 Uruguay 16 – 7 Paraguay

27 OCT 1977 Paraguay 25 – 13 Brasil

29 OCT 1977 Argentina 77 – 3 Paraguay

4th Place

Sudamericano 1979 Santiago, Viña del Mar, Chile

04 OCT 1979 Chile 27 – 13 Paraguay

07 OCT 1979 Argentina 76 – 13 Paraguay

09 OCT 1979 Paraguay 9 – 53 Uruguay

12 OCT 1979 Brasil 16 – 6 Paraguay

5th place

Sudamericano 1981 Montevideo, Uruguay

17 MAY 1981 Uruguay 54 – 14 Paraguay

21 MAY 1981 Chile 33 – 3 Paraguay

23 MAY 1981 Paraguay 35 – 3 Brasil

3rd place

Sudamericano 1983 Buenos Aires, Argentina

16 JUL 1983 Paraguay 12 – 20 Uruguay

20 JUL 1983 Argentina 43 – 3 Paraguay

23 JUL 1983 Chile 24 – 12 Paraguay

4th place

Sudamericano 1985 Asunción, Paraguay

15 SEP 1985 Chile 15 – 12 Paraguay

19 SEP 1985 Paraguay 9 – 9 Uruguay

21 SEP 1985 Argentina 102 – 3 Paraguay

4th Place

Sudamericano 1987 Santiago, Chile

27 SEP 1987 Chile 28 – 16 Paraguay

30 SEP 1987 Argentina 62 – 4 Paraguay

03 OCT 1987 Paraguay 12 – 20 Uruguay

4th place

Sudamericano 1989 Montevideo, Uruguay

07 OCT 1989 Chile 12 – 9 Paraguay

08 OCT 1989 Uruguay 32 – 7 Paraguay

12 OCT 1989 Brasil 40 – 11 Paraguay

14 OCT 1989 Argentina 75 – 7 Paraguay

5th place

Sudamericano 1991 5 Naciones

17 AGO 1991 Uruguay 29 – 13 Paraguay

19 AGO 1991 Chile 25 – 18 Paraguay

07 SEP 1991 Brasil 6 – 33 Paraguay

28 SEP 1991 Paraguay 10 – 37 Argentina

4th place

Sudamericano 1993 5 Naciones

28 SEP 1993 Chile 24 – 25 Paraguay

02 OCT 1993 Paraguay 3 – 67 Uruguay

10 OCT 1993 Paraguay 49 – 21 Brasil

16 OCT 1993 Argentina 51 – 3 Paraguay

3rd place

Sudamericano 1995 4 Naciones

22 SEP 1995 Paraguay 14 – 24 Chile

24 SEP 1995 Paraguay 9 – 103 Argentina

30 SEP 1995 Uruguay 48 – 12 Paraguay

4th place

Sudamericano 1997 4 Naciones

30 AGO 1997 Chile 58 – 16 Paraguay

13 SEP 1997 Argentina 78 – 0 Paraguay

20 SEP 1997 Paraguay 9 – 67 Uruguay

4th place

Sudamericano 1998 4 Naciones

03 OCT 1998 Paraguay 0 – 59 Argentina

10 OCT 1998 Uruguay 93 – 3 Paraguay

17 OCT 1998 Paraguay 17 – 58 Chile

4th place

Sudamericano 2001 4 Naciones

06 OCT 2001 Uruguay 62 – 8 Paraguay

27 OCT 2001 Chile 48 – 0 Paraguay

10 NOV 2001 Paraguay 15 – 69 Argentina

4th place

Sudamericano A 2002 Mendoza, Argentina

28 ABR 2002 Chile 57 – 5 Paraguay

01 MAY 2002 Argentina 152 – 0 Paraguay

05 MAY 2002 Uruguay 81 – 8 Paraguay

4th place

Sudamericano A 2003 Montevideo, Uruguay

27 ABR 2003 Argentina 144 – 0 Paraguay

30 ABR 2003 Uruguay 53 – 7 Paraguay

03 MAY 2003 Chile 102 – 0 Paraguay

4th place

Sudamericano B 2004 San Pablo, Brasil

10 OCT 2004 Paraguay 79 – 72 Colombia

13 OCT 2004 Paraguay 74 – 0 Perú

16 OCT 2004 Brasil 17 – 22 Paraguay

Champion of Sudamericano B

Sudamericano B 2005 Asunción, Paraguay

23 SEP 2005 Paraguay 82 – 8 Colombia

25 SEP 2005 Paraguay 68 – 3 Perú

28 SEP 2005 Paraguay 94 – 7 Venezuela

02 OCT 2005 Paraguay 45 – 8 Brasil

Champion of Sudamericano B

Sudamericano B 2008 Luque, Paraguay

19 JUN 2008 Paraguay 44 – 3 Venezuela

21 JUN 2008 Paraguay 71 – 0 Peru

26 JUN 2008 Paraguay 60 – 7 Colombia

29 JUN 2008 Paraguay 6 – 15 Brasil

2nd Sudamericano B

Sudamericano A 2009 Montevideo, Uruguay

25 APR 2009 Uruguay 85 – 7 Paraguay

29 APR 2009 Chile 34 – 13 Paraguay

02 MAY 2009 Brazil 36 – 21 Paraguay

5th place

Sudamericano A 2010 Santiago de Chile, Chile

13 MAY 2010 Chile 42 – 6 Paraguay

16 MAY 2010 Paraguay 14 – 47 Uruguay

19 MAY 2010 Brazil 23 – 18 Paraguay

5th place

Sudamericano A 2011 Misiones, Argentina

14 MAY 2011 Uruguay 102 – 6 Paraguay

17 MAY 2011 Chile 71 – 3 Paraguay

20 MAY 2011 Brasil 51 – 14 Paraguay

5th place

Sudamericano B 2012 Valencia, Venezuela

09 SEP 2012 Paraguay 54 – 17 Colombia

12 SEP 2012 Paraguay 69 – 3 Peru

15 SEP 2012 Venezuela 8 – 73 Paraguay

Champion Sudamericano B

Sudamericano B 2013 Luque, Paraguay

25 AGO 2013 Paraguay 22 – 0 Peru

27 AGO 2013 Paraguay 28 – 7 Venezuela

30 AGO 2013 Paraguay 25 – 15 Colombia

Champion Sudamericano B

Sudamericano A 2014

26 April Paraguay 10 – 34 Uruguay / Asuncion.

3 May Chile 22 – 18 Paraguay / Concepcion – Chile.

10 May Paraguay 31 – 24 Brazil / Luque – Paraguay.

Paraguay achieved the 2nd position and qualified The CONSUR Cup of 2015.

Sudamericano A 2015

11 April Uruguay 77 – 3 Paraguay / Montevideo – This game was also valid for the first date of The CONSUR Cup.

3 May Paraguay 25 – 35 Chile / Asuncion

9 May Brazil 11 – 22 Paraguay / Bento Goncalvez – Brasil

23 May Paraguay 7 – 71 Argentina / Olympic Park – Asuncion – This game was also valid for the first date of The CONSUR Cup.

Paraguay finished in the 3rd position of the South American Tournament as well as in the CONSUR Cup of 2015.

Sudamericano A 2016

23 April Chile 68 – 7 Paraguay / Santiago.

30 April Paraguay 15 – 60 Uruguay / Luque – Paraguay.

7 May Paraguay 21 – 32 Brazil / Luque – Paraguay.

Paraguay finished in the last position having to play a repechage to Colombia for staying in The South American group A.

Saturday, 19 November Paraguay 39 – 27 Colombia / Asuncion.

Paraguay keeps his place in the group A.

Sudamericano A 2017

13 May Paraguay 19 – 45 Uruguay / Asuncion.

20 May Chile 66 – 7 Paraguay / Santiago.

26 May Brazil 57 – 6 Paraguay / São Paulo.

Paraguay finished in last position. The South American Tournament was modified for 2018.

Sudamericano de Rugby A 2018

6 Nations played in 2 series. Each team faced only the teams of the other series. Paraguay plays east Series.

5 May Paraguay 3 – 64 Argentina XV / Asuncion.

12 May Paraguay 28 – 26 Colombia / Asuncion.

19 May Chile 97 – 0 Paraguay / Santiago

Paraguay finished in the 5th position just ahead of Colombia, received 187 points against, scoring only 31 points in favor.

== See also ==
- Paraguayan Rugby Union
- Rugby union in Paraguay
- Paraguay national rugby sevens team
