= 2015 Rugby World Cup – Americas qualification =

Tournament details
- Dates: 24 March 2012 – 29 May 2014
- No. of nations: 18

Tournament statistics
- Matches played: 30

In the Americas Region for 2015 Rugby World Cup qualifying, Argentina had automatically qualified for the World Cup, and two places were available in the Americas qualification process, which were taken by Canada and the United States. An additional Americas team, Uruguay, also qualified as the Play-off winner.

== Format ==
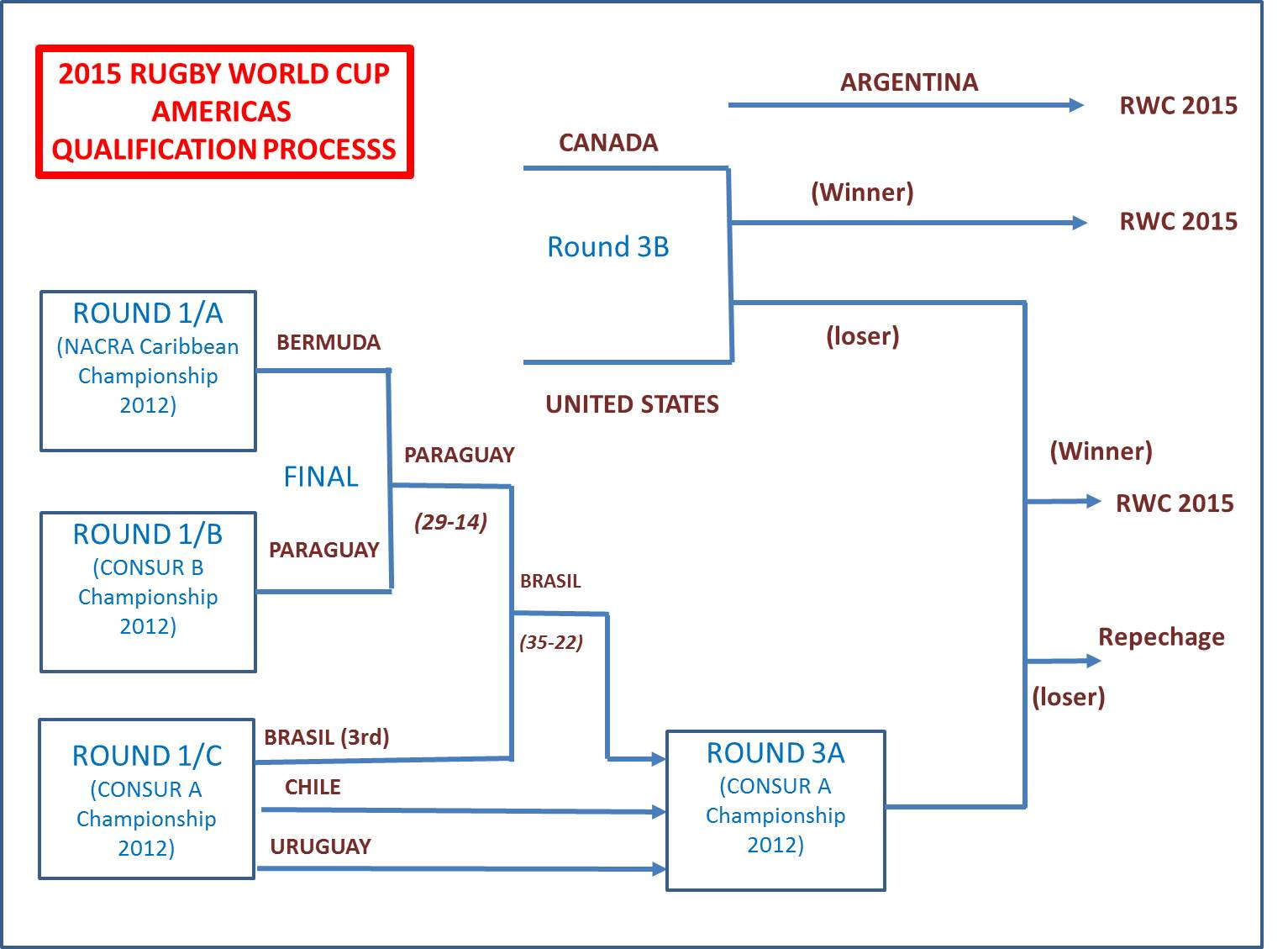
2015 Rugby World Cup qualification process for Americas. NOTE: Round 3A should read 2013, not 2012.

The qualification process for the 2–3 teams from the Americas participating in the 2015 Rugby World Cup are as follows:

Round 1:

Round 1 was split into two sections, Round 1A and Round 1B.

- The 2012 NACRA Rugby Championship acted as the qualification matches for Round 1A. The Caribbean teams were split into two zones consisting of two rounds.

Round 1 consisted of the bottom five teams of the NACRA region, to the IRB rankings, playing each other in a robin-round format. The winning nations of either zone then advanced to Round 2 of their respective zones. The winning nations in either zone after Round 2, earned the right to compete for the NACRA Rugby Championship title, thus being able to advance to the Round 1 Final.

- The 2012 CONSUR B Rugby Championship acted as the qualification matches for Round 1B. The second division teams all played each other once, with the winning team of the tournament advancing to the Round 1 Final.
- The Round 1 Final saw the Caribbean champions and the CONSUR B champions play each other for the right to play in the Round 2 Final against the losing team of the CONSUR A tournament, or Round 2A.

Round 2:

- The 2012 CONSUR A Rugby Championship formed the qualification process for Round 2A. The top two teams of the tournament, remained in the division for the 2013 Championship. The bottom placed team, advanced to Round 2 Final to play the Round 1 Final victors. The winning side of Round 2 Final, earned the right to compete in the 2013 CONSUR A tournament, keeping their Rugby World Cup dreams alive.

Round 3:

Like Round 1, Round 3 was also split into two sections, Round 3A and Round 3B.

- Round 3A used the 2013 CONSUR A Rugby Championship as the qualification matches. The winning side would advance to the Round 3 Final and would play the losing side from Round 3B.
- Round 3B saw Canada and the United States play a two-match series in August 2013. The winner of the series qualified for the 2015 Rugby World Cup as Americas 1, and enters the tournament in Pool D. The losing team parachuted down to the Round 3 Final and would play the winning side from Round 3A.
- The Round 3 Final, would see the loser of Round 3B play a two-match series with the winning team from Round 3A. The winner of this two-match series, qualified for the Rugby World Cup as Americas 2. The losing side, would move to the Repechage and play in an inter-confederation match against the second placed team from the Asian qualification process.

== Entrants ==
The 2015 Rugby World Cup qualifying teams that will compete for the 2015 Rugby World Cup – Americas qualification. (World rankings, shown in brackets, are to first Americas qualification match on 24 March 2012)

- Bahamas (87)
- Barbados (78)
- Bermuda (48)
- Brazil (35)
- Canada (13)
- Cayman Islands (67)
- Chile (23)
- Colombia (75)
- Guyana (59)
- Jamaica (86)
- Mexico (71)
- Paraguay (41)
- Peru (64)
- Saint Vincent and the Grenadines (76)
- Trinidad and Tobago (50)
- United States (17)
- Uruguay (21)
- Venezuela (53)

=== Qualified nations ===
- Argentina (Automatic qualifier)
- Canada (Americas 1)
- Uruguay (Play-off winner)
- United States (Americas 2)

== Round 1 ==
=== Round 1A: 2012 NACRA Rugby Championship ===
The 2012 NACRA Championship was the first qualifying event for the 2015 Rugby World Cup. The tournament featured nine IRB members from the Caribbean and North and South America. Those teams, along with their IRB World Ranking and rating points as of March 19, 2012, were as follows:

Teams

- Bermuda 48th, 45.94
- Trinidad and Tobago 50th, 45.85
- Guyana 59th, 42.54
- Cayman Islands 67th, 41.23
- Mexico 71st, 40.00* (new ranking)
- Saint Vincent and the Grenadines 76th, 39.30
- Barbados 78th, 39.13
- Jamaica 86th, 36.35
- Bahamas 87th, 36.33

==== Zone 1 ====
===== Round 1 =====
The winning team, Cayman Islands, advanced to Zone 1 Round 2 to face Bahamas and Bermuda.

Advanced to Zone 1 Round 2

Place	Nation	Games				Points			Table points
Place	Nation	played	won	drawn	lost	for	against	difference	Table points
1	Cayman Islands	2	1	0	1	64	32	+32	6
2	Mexico	2	1	0	1	81	60	+21	5
3	Jamaica	2	1	0	1	33	86	-53	4

Matches

24 March 2012
15:30 CDT (UTC-05)

Mexico	68–14	Jamaica
	Stats

La Ibero Santa Fe, Mexico City
Attendance: 2,000
Referee: Craig Joubert (South Africa)

7 April 2012
16:00 EST (UTC-05)

Jamaica	19–18	Cayman Islands
	Stats

Utech Sports Field, Kingston
Attendance: 150
Referee: Keith Hodgkins (Bermuda)

21 April 2012
16:00 EST (UTC-05)

Cayman Islands	46–13	Mexico
	Stats

Truman Bodden Sports Complex, George Town
Attendance: 1,400
Referee: Paul Bretz (Stats])

===== Round 2 =====
The winning team, Bermuda, advanced to the final of the 2012 NACRA Championship, or Round 1A final, to face Zone 2 winners Guyana.

Advanced to Round 1A Final

Place	Nation	Games				Points			Table points
Place	Nation	played	won	drawn	lost	for	against	difference	Table points
1	Bermuda	2	2	0	0	23	11	+12	8
2	Cayman Islands	2	1	0	1	30	14	+16	6
3	Bahamas	2	0	0	2	15	43	-28	0

Matches

19 May 2012
16:00 AST (UTC-04)

Bermuda	7–3	Cayman Islands
	Stats

National Sports Center, Hamilton
Referee: Andrew Hosie (Canada)

26 May 2012
16:00 EST (UTC-05)

Cayman Islands	27–7	Bahamas
	Stats

Truman Bodden Stadium, George Town
Attendance: 1,600
Referee: Stats]])

9 June 2012
16:00 EDT (UTC-04)

Bahamas	8–16	Bermuda
	Stats

Winton Rugby Centre, Nassau
Attendance: 400
Referee: Aruna Ranaweera (Stats)

==== Zone 2 ====
===== Round 1 =====
The winning team, Barbados, advanced to Zone 2 Round 2 to face Guyana and Trinidad and Tobago.

Advanced to Zone 2 Round 2

Place	Nation	Games				Points			Table points
Place	Nation	played	won	drawn	lost	for	against	difference	Table points
1	Barbados	2	2	0	0	85	3	+82	8
2	Saint Vincent and the Grenadines	2	0	0	2	3	85	-82	0

Matches

7 April 2012
15:00 AST (UTC-04)

Saint Vincent and the Grenadines	3–34	Barbados
	Stats

Arnos Vale Cricket Stadium, Arnos Vale
Referee: Alwyne Etwah (Guyana)

21 April 2012
16:00 AST (UTC-04)

Barbados	51–0	Saint Vincent and the Grenadines
	Stats

Garrison Savannah, Bridgetown
Attendance: 200
Referee: Alasdair Robertson (Cayman Islands)

===== Round 2 =====
The winning team, Guyana, advanced to the final of the 2012 NACRA Caribbean Championship, or Round 1A Final, to face Zone 1 winners Bermuda.

Advanced to Round 1A Final

Place	Nation	Games				Points			Table points
Place	Nation	played	won	drawn	lost	for	against	difference	Table points
1	Guyana	2	1	1	0	30	10	+20	6
2	Trinidad and Tobago	2	1	0	1	32	23	+9	4
3	Barbados	2	0	1	1	13	42	-29	2

Matches

5 May 2012
16:00 AST (UTC-04)

Trinidad and Tobago	32–3	Barbados
	Stats

St Mary's College Ground, Port of Spain
Attendance: 400
Referee: Pablo Septien (Mexico)

19 May 2012
16:00 AST (UTC-04)

Barbados	10–10	Guyana
	Stats

Garrison Savannah, Bridgetown
Attendance: 200
Referee: Bryan Arciero (Canada)

2 June 2012
16:00 AST (UTC-04)

Guyana	20–0	Trinidad and Tobago
	Stats

Providence National Stadium, Georgetown
Attendance: 400
Referee: George Nicholson (Barbados)

==== Round 1A Final: NACRA Rugby Championship Final ====
The winning team, Bermuda, advanced to the Round 1 Final to face the winner of the 2012 CONSUR B, or Round 1B victors, Paraguay.

23 June 2012
15:30 AST (UTC-04)

Bermuda	18–0	Guyana

National Sports Center, Hamilton
Referee: Pablo Septien (Mexico)

=== Round 1B: 2012 CONSUR Rugby Championship B ===
The winning team, Paraguay, advanced to the Round 1 Final to face Bermuda, the winner of the 2012 NACRA Rugby Championship.

Advanced to Round 1 Final

Place	Nation	Games				Points			Table points
Place	Nation	played	won	drawn	lost	for	against	difference	Table points
1	Paraguay	3	3	0	0	196	28	+168	9
2	Colombia	3	2	0	1	92	66	+26	6
3	Venezuela	3	1	0	2	39	116	–77	3
4	Peru	3	0	0	3	29	146	–117	0

Number in brackets indicates the pre-tournament IRB ranking of team

Matches

9 September 2012
14:00 PYT (UTC-04)

Paraguay	54–17	Colombia
	Stats

Estadio Arístides Pineda, Valencia, Venezuela
Referee: Ricardo Sant'Anna (Brazil)

9 September 2012
16:00 PYT (UTC-04)

Venezuela	28–17	Peru
	Stats

Estadio Arístides Pineda, Valencia, Venezuela
Referee: Martín Lugo (Paraguay)

12 September 2012
14:00 PYT (UTC-04)

Paraguay	69–3	Peru
	Stats

Estadio Arístides Pineda, Valencia, Venezuela
Referee: Ricardo Sant'Anna (Brazil)

12 September 2012
16:00 PYT (UTC-04)

Venezuela	3–26	Colombia
	Stats

Estadio Arístides Pineda, Valencia, Venezuela
Referee: Matías Fresia (Argentina)

15 September 2012
14:00 PYT (UTC-04)

Colombia	49–9	Peru
	Stats

Estadio Arístides Pineda, Valencia, Venezuela
Referee: Jean Paul Casanova (Chile)

15 September 2012
16:00 PYT (UTC-04)

Venezuela	8–73	Paraguay
	Stats

Estadio Arístides Pineda, Valencia, Venezuela
Referee: Matías Fresia (Argentina)

=== Round 1 Final ===
The winner of 2012 NACRA Rugby Championship, Bermuda, played the winner of the 2012 CONSUR B tournament, Paraguay, in order to progress through to Round 2. Paraguay were the home team as they were the higher ranked team at 39 to Bermuda's 49.

29 September 2012
16:00 PYT (UTC-04)

Paraguay	29–14	Bermuda
	Stats

Club Universitario de Asunción, Asunción, Paraguay
Attendance: 2,500
Referee: Joaquín Montes (Uruguay)

== Round 2 ==
=== Round 2A: 2012 CONSUR Rugby Championship A ===
The top two teams remained in CONSUR A for the 2013 tournament (Round 3A), thus still being able to qualify for the 2015 Rugby World Cup. The bottom placed team, Brazil, had to face a relegation challenge, Round 2 Final, from the CONSUR B champion, Paraguay, to earn to right to compete in the 2013 tournament and stay within the chance of qualifying for Rugby World Cup 2015.

Stays in contention of RWC place
Advances to Round 2 Final

Team	Played	Won	Drawn	Lost	For	Against	Difference	Pts
Uruguay	2	2	0	0	54	41	+13	6
Chile	2	1	0	1	45	33	+12	3
Brazil	2	0	0	2	21	46	-25	0

Matches

20 May 2012
18:00 CLT (UTC-04)

Chile	19–6	Brazil

Mahuida Parque Reina, Santiago

23 May 2012
18:00 CLT (UTC-04)

Chile	26–27	Uruguay

Mahuida Parque Reina, Santiago
Referee: Matías Fresia (Argentina)

26 May 2012
18:00 CLT (UTC-04)

Brazil	15–27	Uruguay

Mahuida Parque Reina, Santiago
Referee: Felipe Balbontin (Chile)

=== Round 2 Final: CONSUR A/B relegation playoff ===
Paraguay, the winner of Round 1, faced Brazil, the last placed team in the 2012 Consur A competition, or Round 2A, for the right to compete in the 2013 Consur A, or Round 3A, and remain within the chance of qualifying for the World Cup.

Being the higher ranked team, Brazil hosted the match in front of over 10,000 spectators in São Paulo, Brazil's biggest ever home crowd.

27 October 2012
13:30 BRT (UTC-03)

Brazil	35–22	Paraguay
	Stats

Estádio Nicolau Alayon, São Paulo
Attendance: 10,000
Referee: Federico Anselmi (Argentina)

== Round 3 ==
=== Round 3A: 2013 CONSUR Rugby Championship A ===
Round 3A was contested concurrently with the 2013 South American Rugby Championship "A" in Montevideo, Uruguay and Temuco, Chile between 27 April and 4 May 2013. However, this tournament included already qualified nation Argentina, and therefore had no effect on who advanced to the NACRA-CONSUR playoff final. This means fixtures against Argentina by Brazil, Chile or Uruguay were not included as Rugby World Cup qualification matches. The winner of this qualifying round, Uruguay, advanced to the NACRA-CONSUR playoff final, to stay in contention for qualifying for the 2015 Rugby World Cup as Americas 2 or to progress to the Repechage qualifying.

Advanced to NACRA-CONSUR playoff final

Place	Nation	Games				Points			Table points
Place	Nation	played	won	drawn	lost	for	against	diff	Table points
1	Uruguay	2	2	0	0	81	16	+65	6
2	Chile	2	1	0	1	47	45	+2	3
3	Brazil	2	0	0	2	29	96	–67	0

Matches

27 April 2013
18:00 CLT (UTC-04)

Chile	38–22	Brazil
	Stats

Estadio Municipal Germán Becker, Temuco, Chile
Referee: Claudio Antonio (Argentina)

1 May 2013
15:45 UYT (UTC-03)

Uruguay	58–7	Brazil
	Stats

Estadio Charrúa, Montevideo, Uruguay
Referee: Juan Sylvestre (Argentina)

4 May 2013
15:45 UYT (UTC-03)

Uruguay	23–9	Chile
	Stats

Estadio Charrúa, Montevideo, Uruguay
Referee: Francisco Pastrana (Argentina)

=== Round 3B: United States v Canada Home & Away playoffs ===
Canada defeated the USA in a two-legged play off, sweeping the series and winning 40–20 on aggregate, thus qualifying for the World Cup as Americas 1. USA progressed to the NACRA-CONSUR playoff final against Uruguay.

17 August 2013
18:30 EDT (UTC-04)

United States	9–27	Canada
Pen: Wyles (3/5) 40', 60', 75'	Stats	Try: Mack 1' c Jones 50' c Van der Merwe 63' c Con: Pritchard (3/3) 1', 51', 64'; Pen: Pritchard (2/2) 14', 38'

Blackbaud Stadium, Charleston, South Carolina
Attendance: 5,258
Referee: Leighton Hodges (Wales)

Team details

FB	15	Chris Wyles
RW	14	Takudzwa Ngwenya
OC	13	Seamus Kelly	(substituted off) 24'
IC	12	Andrew Suniula
LW	11	Blaine Scully
FH	10	Toby L'Estrange	(substituted off) 68'
SH	9	Mike Petri	(substituted off) 70'
N8	8	Todd Clever (c)
OF	7	Peter Dahl	(substituted off) 37'
BF	6	Scott LaValla	(substituted off) 70'
RL	5	Samu Manoa
LL	4	Louis Stanfill
TP	3	Eric Fry	(substituted off) 60'
HK	2	Chris Biller	(substituted off) 70'
LP	1	Shawn Pittman	(substituted off) 70'
Replacements:
HK	16	Zach Fenoglio	(substituted in) 70'
PR	17	Titi Lamositele	(substituted in) 70'
PR	18	Phil Thiel	(substituted in) 60'
LK	19	Brian Doyle	(substituted in) 37'
N8	20	Cam Dolan	(substituted in) 70'
SH	21	Robbie Shaw	(substituted in) 70'
FH	22	Folau Niua	(substituted in) 68'
CE	23	Roland Suniula	(substituted in) 24'
Coach:
(United States) Mike Tolkin

FB	15	James Pritchard
RW	14	Matt Evans	(substituted off) 65'
OC	13	Ciaran Hearn
IC	12	Nick Blevins
LW	11	D. T. H. van der Merwe
FH	10	Harry Jones	(substituted off) 68'
SH	9	Phil Mack	(substituted off) 74'
N8	8	Aaron Carpenter (c)	(substituted off) 65'
OF	7	John Moonlight
BF	6	Tyler Ardron
RL	5	Jamie Cudmore	(substituted off) 40'
LL	4	Jebb Sinclair
TP	3	Jason Marshall	(substituted off) 70'
HK	2	Ryan Hamilton	(substituted off) 40'
LP	1	Andrew Tiedemann	(substituted off) 57'
Replacements:
HK	16	Ray Barkwill	(substituted in) 40'
PR	17	Tom Dolezel	(substituted in) 57'
PR	18	Doug Wooldridge	(substituted in) 70'
LK	19	Tyler Hotson	(substituted in) 40'
FL	20	Nanyak Dala	(substituted in) 65'
SH	21	Sean White	(substituted in) 74'
FH	22	Nathan Hirayama	(substituted in) 68'
CE	23	Phil Mackenzie	(substituted in) 65'
Coach:
(New Zealand) Kieran Crowley

Man of the Match:
(Canada) Phil Mack

Touch judges:
JP Doyle (England)
Marius Mitrea (Italy)
Television match official:
Jim Yuille (Scotland)

24 August 2013
16:00 EDT (UTC-04)

Canada	13–11	United States
Try: Pritchard 22' m Marshall 60' m Con: Pritchard (0/2); Pen: Pritchard (1/3) 20'	Stats	Try: Ngwenya 16' m Con: Wyles (0/1); Pen: Wyles (2/4) 40', 66'

BMO Field, Toronto
Attendance: 10,207
Referee: JP Doyle (England)

Team details

FB	15	James Pritchard		(substituted off) 66'
RW	14	Matt Evans
OC	13	Ciaran Hearn
IC	12	Nick Blevins
LW	11	D. T. H. van der Merwe
FH	10	Harry Jones
SH	9	Phil Mack		(substituted off) 63'
N8	8	Aaron Carpenter (c)
OF	7	John Moonlight
BF	6	Tyler Ardron
RL	5	Tyler Hotson
LL	4	Jebb Sinclair		(substituted off) 55'
TP	3	Jason Marshall		(substituted off) 76'
HK	2	Ray Barkwill
LP	1	Andrew Tiedemann		(substituted off) 40'
Replacements:
PR	16	Tom Dolezel		(substituted in) 40'
PR	17	Doug Wooldridge		(substituted in) 76'
HK	18	Aaron Flagg
LK	19	Jon Phelan
FL	20	Nanyak Dala	(yellow card) 65'	(substituted in) 55'
SH	21	Sean White		(substituted in) 63'
FH	22	Nathan Hirayama		(substituted in) 66'
CE	23	Phil Mackenzie
Coach:
(New Zealand) Kieran Crowley

FB	15	Blaine Scully
RW	14	Takudzwa Ngwenya
OC	13	Chris Wyles
IC	12	Andrew Suniula	(substituted off) 60'
LW	11	Luke Hume
FH	10	Toby L'Estrange
SH	9	Robbie Shaw	(substituted off) 55'
N8	8	Todd Clever (c)
OF	7	Peter Dahl	(substituted off) 67'
BF	6	Scott LaValla
RL	5	Brian Doyle
LL	4	Louis Stanfill	(substituted off) 55'
TP	3	Eric Fry	(substituted off) 50'
HK	2	Chris Biller	(substituted off) 66'
LP	1	Shawn Pittman
Replacements:
HK	16	Zach Fenoglio	(substituted in) 66'
PR	17	Titi Lamositele	(substituted in) 50'
PR	18	Phil Thiel
N8	19	Cam Dolan	(substituted in) 55'
LK	20	Derek Asbun	(substituted in) 67'
SH	21	Mike Petri	(substituted in) 55'
FH	22	Folau Niua	(substituted in) 60'
CE	23	Roland Suniula
Coach:
(United States) Mike Tolkin

Touch judges:
Leighton Hodges (Wales)
Marius Mitrea (Italy)
Television match official:
Jim Yuille (Scotland)

=== Round 3 Final: NACRA-CONSUR playoff final ===
The losing team from Round 3B, United States, played the winner from Round 3A, Uruguay to determine who qualifies as Americas 2. The final consisted of a home-and-away series, with the winner on aggregate, United States (59–40 or 1–0), qualifying for the World Cup as Americas 2.

The loser, Uruguay, advanced to the repechage to play Asia 2, Hong Kong.

22 March 2014
16:00 UYT (UTC-03)

Uruguay	27–27	United States
Try: Prada 32' c Ormaechea 73' m Con: Berchesi (1/2) 33'; Pen: Berchesi (5/8) 4', 22', 30', 36', 42'	Stats	Try: Thiel 38' c Manoa 46' c Wyles 53' c Con: Niua (3/3) 39', 47', 54'; Pen: Niua (2/3) 2', 27'

Estadio Charrúa, Montevideo
Referee: Mathieu Raynal (France)

Team details

FB	15	Gastón Mieres
RW	14	Leandro Leivas
OC	13	Joaquín Prada
IC	12	Andrés Vilaseca		(substituted off) 55'
LW	11	Jerónimo Etcheverry		(substituted off) 63'
FH	10	Felipe Berchesi
SH	9	Agustín Ormaechea
N8	8	Alejandro Nieto
OF	7	Diego Magno	(yellow card) 26'
BF	6	Juan Manuel Gaminara
RL	5	Santiago Vilaseca		(substituted off) 55'
LL	4	Mathias Palomeque		(substituted off) 75'
TP	3	Oscar Durán		(substituted off) 40'
HK	2	Arturo Avalo (c)		(substituted off) 50'
LP	1	Alejo Corral		(substituted off) 56'
Replacements:
LK	16	Cristofer Soares De Lima		(substituted in) 75'
PR	17	Rodolfo De Mula		(substituted in) 56'
PR	18	Mario Sagario		(substituted in) 40'
HK	19	Nicolás Klappenbach		(substituted in) 50'
FL	20	Franco Lamanna		(substituted in) 55'
FL	21	Juan De Freitas		(substituted in) 55'
SH	22	Alejo Durán
WG	23	Francisco Bulanti		(substituted in) 63'
Coach:
(Uruguay) Pablo Lemoine

FB	15	Chris Wyles
RW	14	Blaine Scully
OC	13	Folau Niua
IC	12	Andrew Suniula
LW	11	Tim Maupin		(substituted off) 40'
FH	10	Toby L'Estrange		(substituted off) 74'
SH	9	Mike Petri
N8	8	Cam Dolan
OF	7	Scott LaValla
BF	6	Todd Clever (c)		(substituted off) 57'
RL	5	Samu Manoa
LL	4	Hayden Smith		(substituted off) 50'
TP	3	Eric Fry
HK	2	Phil Thiel		(substituted off) 74'
LP	1	Olive Kilifi		(substituted off) 63'
Replacements:
HK	16	Tom Coolican		(substituted in) 74'
PR	17	Nicholas Wallace	(yellow card) 71'	(substituted in) 63'
PR	18	Titi Lamositele			(substituted in) 72'
FL	19	Louis Stanfill		(substituted in) 50'
FL	20	Kyle Sumsion		(substituted in) 57'	(substituted off) 72'
FH	21	Shalom Suniula		(substituted in) 74'
CE	22	Seamus Kelly
WG	23	Luke Hume		(substituted in) 40'
Coach:
(United States) Mike Tolkin

Touch judges:
Ignacio Iparaguirre (Argentina)
Carlos Poggie (Argentina)
Television match official:
Santiago Borsani (Argentina)

29 March 2014
15:30 EDT (UTC-04)

United States	32–13	Uruguay
Try: Fry 46' c Petri 61' c S. Suniula 66' c A. Suniula 68' m Con: Wyles (3/4) 47', 62', 67'; Pen: Wyles (2/3) 35', 76'	Stats	Try: Prada 23' c Con: Berchesi (1/1) 23'; Pen: Berchesi (2/3) 37', 40+1'

Fifth Third Bank Stadium, Kennesaw, Georgia
Attendance: 6,300
Referee: Greg Garner (England)

Team details

FB	15	Chris Wyles
RW	14	Blaine Scully
OC	13	Seamus Kelly		(substituted off) 78'
IC	12	Andrew Suniula	(yellow card) 16'	(substituted off) 70'
LW	11	Luke Hume
FH	10	Toby L'Estrange		(substituted off) 62'
SH	9	Mike Petri
N8	8	Cam Dolan		(substituted off) 72'
OF	7	Scott LaValla
BF	6	Todd Clever (c)		(substituted off) 22'	(substituted in) 33'
RL	5	Samu Manoa
LL	4	Louis Stanfill		(substituted off) 69'
TP	3	Eric Fry				(substituted off) 69'
HK	2	Phil Thiel		(substituted off) 74'
LP	1	Olive Kilifi		(substituted off) 19'
Replacements:
HK	16	Tom Coolican		(substituted in) 74'
PR	17	Nicholas Wallace	(yellow card) 21'	(substituted in) 19'
PR	18	Titi Lamositele		(substituted in) 22'	(substituted off) 33'	(substituted in) 69'
LK	19	Tai Tuisamoa		(substituted in) 69'
FL	20	Kyle Sumsion		(substituted in) 72'
FH	21	Shalom Suniula		(substituted in) 62'
WG	22	Tim Maupin		(substituted in) 70'
CE	23	Folau Niua		(substituted in) 78'
Coach:
(United States) Mike Tolkin

FB	15	Gastón Mieres
RW	14	Leandro Leivas
OC	13	Joaquín Prada		(substituted off) 59'
IC	12	Andrés Vilaseca		(substituted off) 9'
LW	11	Jerónimo Etcheverry
FH	10	Felipe Berchesi
SH	9	Agustín Ormaechea
N8	8	Alejandro Nieto
OF	7	Diego Magno		(substituted off) 21'
BF	6	Juan Manuel Gaminara
RL	5	Mathias Palomeque		(substituted off) 46'
LL	4	Santiago Vilaseca		(substituted off) 70'
TP	3	Oscar Durán		(substituted off) 35'
HK	2	Arturo Avalo (c)	(yellow card) 34'				(substituted off) 47'
LP	1	Alejo Corral		(substituted off) 40'
Replacements:
LK	16	Cristofer Soares De Lima		(substituted in) 70'
PR	17	Rodolfo De Mula		(substituted in) 40'
PR	18	Mario Sagario		(substituted in) 35'
HK	19	Carlos Pombo			(substituted in) 39'	(substituted off) 45'	(substituted in) 47'
FL	20	Franco Lamanna		(substituted in) 46'
FL	21	Juan De Freitas		(substituted in) 21'
SH	22	Alejo Durán		(substituted in) 59'
WG	23	Francisco Bulanti		(substituted in) 9'	(substituted off) 39'	(substituted in) 45'
Coach:
(Uruguay) Pablo Lemoine

Touch judges:
David Smortchevsky (Canada)
Andrew McMaster (Canada)
Television match official:
Jim Yuille (Scotland)
