= Pablo Lemoine =

Uruguay international rugby union player & coach

Pablo Adrián Lemoine
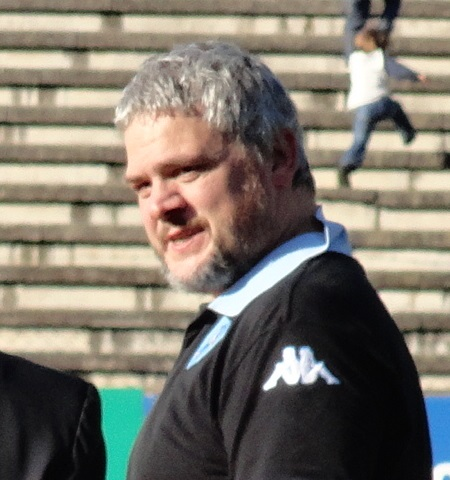
- Lemoine during Uruguay's 2015 Rugby World Cup qualifier with Russia
- Born: Pablo Adrian Lemoine; 1 March 1975 (age 51) Montevideo, Uruguay
- Height: 6 ft 1 in (1.85 m)
- Weight: 276 lb (125 kg)

Rugby union career
- Position: Prop
Amateur team(s)
Years	Team	Apps	(Points)
1995–1998	Montevideo Cricket Club		
2011–2012	Montevideo Cricket Club		
Senior career
Years	Team	Apps	(Points)
1998–2000	Bristol Shoguns	?	(?)
2000–2006	Stade Français	91	(20)
2006–2008	Montauban	29	(0)
2009–2010	Valence d'Agen	15	(5)
International career
Years	Team	Apps	(Points)
1991	Uruguay U–17		
1992–94	Uruguay U–19		
1995–96	Uruguay U–20		
1996–2010	Uruguay	48	(20)
Coaching career
- Years: Team
- 2012: Montevideo Cricket Club U–19
- 2012–2015: Uruguay
- 2018: Germany
- 2018–: Chile
- Correct as of 2 September 2018

Pablo Adrian Lemoine (born 1 March 1975 in Montevideo) is a former Uruguayan rugby union player and former head coach of the Uruguayan national rugby team and German national team. He is currently the head coach of the Chile national team.

== Playing career ==
=== Club career ===
Lemoine first started playing rugby at the age of 11, and two years later he trained with the Montevideo Cricket Club, working his way through the age grade teams - along the way he won the junior National Championship in 1989, 1990, 1992 and 1994. He made his debut with the senior side in 1995, during the Campeonato Uruguayo de Rugby, against Club Champagnat. He was noticed in his own country, then moved to Bristol Shoguns ahead of the 1998–1999 Allied Dunbar Premiership Two season, where he became the first ever Uruguayan professional rugby player. He helped the team gain promotion to the highest level in English domestic rugby for the 1999–2000 English Premiership, where Bristol finished sixth in the table. They additionally finished top of their pool in the European Challenge Cup, making it to the semi-final only to lose to Pau 51–27.

He moved to Stade Français for the 2000–01 French Rugby Union Championship, where his side progressed to the quarter-finals in his debut season. His side also made it to the 2001 Heineken Cup Final, though they lost to Leicester Tigers 34–30. His side struggled in the 2001–02, only making it as far as the second round in the Top 16, and getting knocked out in the Quarter-finals during the 2001–02 Heineken Cup. However, Stade Français managed to achieve the Top 16 title in 2003. They retained their title in 2004, and came second in 2005. They also reached the 2005 Heineken Cup Final, only to lose to Toulouse 18–12 in Extra time. Haven been injured midway through the 2005–06 season, Lemoine was released from his contract and moved to Montauban. Haven finished seventh in consecutive seasons with Montauban, Pablo moved to Avenir Valencien in the Fédérale 1, before returning home to Uruguay in 2010, playing with Montevideo Cricket Club, before retiring in 2012.

=== International career ===
Haven played for Uruguay at age grade level between 1991 and 1996, of which he captained the U–19's side in the Under 19 Rugby World Championship in 1993 and 1994, Lemoine made his debut for the senior Uruguayan side on 2 September 1995 against Spain, winning 47–10. He went on to play a further 13 times, before scoring his first international test try, against Portugal. He was selected for the 1999 Rugby World Cup, where he started in all three games for the Teros. He featured again in a Rugby World Cup, where again he played in all games that Uruguay played in during the 2003 tournament. Lemoine was the first Uruguayan to score a try in a Rugby World Cup match, scoring in the 60–13 defeat to Samoa on 15 October 2003. His last game was on 27 November 2010 against Romania in the 2011 RWC final place play-off match, where they failed to qualify for the 2011 Rugby World Cup. He has 48 caps, with 4 tries scored, 20 points on aggregate.

=== International Tries ===
Try	Opposing team	Location	Venue	Competition	Date	Result	Score
1	Portugal	Montevideo, Uruguay	Carrasco Polo Club	1999 Rugby World Cup – repechage qualification	13 March 1999	Win	46 – 9
2	Portugal	Montevideo, Uruguay	Carrasco Polo Club	1999 Rugby World Cup – repechage qualification	13 March 1999	Win	46 – 9
3	Samoa	Perth, Australia	Subiaco Oval	2003 Rugby World Cup	15 October 2003	Loss	60 – 13
4	England	Brisbane, Australia	Suncorp Stadium	2003 Rugby World Cup	2 November 2003	Loss	111 – 13

=== Honours ===
Bristol Shoguns

- Allied Dunbar Premiership Two
  - Winners: 1999

Stade Français

- French Rugby Championship/Top 16
  - Winners: 2003, 2004
  - Runners-up: 2005
- Heineken Cup
  - Runners-up: 2001, 2005
- Coupe de France
  - Winners: 1999

Avenir Valencien

- Challenge of l'Espérance
  - Winners: 2010

Uruguay

- South American Rugby Championship
  - Runners-up: 1997, 1998, 2002

== Coaching career ==
=== Uruguay ===
After retiring from rugby in early 2012, Lemoine took up coaching, where he began coaching the Montevideo Cricket Club U–19's side. Though this was a short stint, as he was later named head coach of the Uruguayan national side on a 4-year contract, with the aim of qualifying for the 2015 Rugby World Cup. He first match in charge came against Argentina during the 2012 South American Rugby Championship "A", where Argentina won 40–5. Uruguay went on to beat Chile and Brazil to claim second place. In June 2012, Uruguay competed in the 2012 IRB Nations Cup, where Uruguay finished fourth behind hosts Romania, Argentina Jaguars and Italy A. The 2013 South American Rugby Championship "A" started Uruguay's qualification progress for the 2015 Rugby World Cup, which kept alive haven finished second to advance to the NACRA-CONSUR playoff final, against the United States. The opening leg of the play-offs saw Uruguay draw 27–27 in Montevideo, but lost 32–13 in the return fixture in Kennesaw, Georgia, which sent Lemoine's men to the repechage qualification.

During the 2014 South American Rugby Championship "A", Uruguay claimed their first Championship in 33 years, haven beaten Paraguay 34–10, Brazil 34–9 and Chile 55–13. On 2 August 2014, Uruguay beat Hong Kong 28–3, to set up a home and away series against Russia to claim the final sport in Pool A. Haven lost 22–21 in Krasnoyarsk, Uruguay needed to beat Russia by 2 points or more to qualify, and on 11 October, Uruguay beat Russia 36–27 to qualify for the World Cup. However, the matches leading up to the World Cup, saw Uruguay claim just three wins from 13 games, though one of those wins was a first ever victory over Argentina, winning 30–26 - though it was an Argentina XV side that was fielded. They lost to back to back matches to Japan in August 2015, the first test being a first ever loss to the Japanese, 30–8. Uruguay failed to claim a win during the 2015 Rugby World Cup, losing all their matches in their group; 54–9 to Wales, 65–3 to Australia, 47–15 to Fiji and 60–3 to England. Though, Uruguay did pick up their first World Cup try in 12 years, when Carlos Arboleya scored a try against Fiji on 6 October 2015.

On 1 December 2015, it was announced that Lemoine had stepped down as Uruguayan head coach, and became the new Director of High Performance for the URU, whilst leading the High Performance Center at Estadio Charrúa. Lemoine left his role with the URU in early 2018 following his appointment as the German national team head coach.

=== Germany ===
On 8 January 2018, Pablo Lemoine was announced as the new head coach of Germany after Kobus Potgieter stood down at the end of 2017. Vuyo Zangqa went back to coaching the German VIIs team, after he acted as caretaker coach in Germany's defeat to Chile on 25 November 2017. Lemoine's high profile recruitment by the German Rugby Federation was part of the apex of a larger controversy, the "Rugbystreit" (The "Rugbystreit" in German Rugby.)

Lemoine led Germany into the 2018 Rugby Europe Championship, needing at least three victories to put them within a chance of World Cup qualification. However, with 5 defeats, including the four defeats that goes towards qualification, Germany found themselves at the bottom of the 2018 Rugby Europe Championship table and bottom of the aggregate 2017/2018 Championship table that acted as World Cup qualification. However, following an investigation into the European teams using ineligible players, Belgium, Romania and Spain were deducted points which saw Germany by default finish second and advance to the final round of the European qualification stage. In that round, Germany narrowly defeated Portugal 16–13, to advance to the Europe/Oceania play-off series against Samoa. In the first leg, Samoa convincingly beat Germany 66–15 in Apia. The return leg, saw Samoa complete a series win with a 42–28 win in Heidelberg, despite the fact that Germany led 28–21 leading into the final 10 minutes, but conceded three tries in the closing minutes of the game.

In August 2018, it was announced that the German Rugby Federation were searching for a new coach ahead of the 2019 Rugby World Cup Repechage, after it emerged Lemoine had returned to South America.

=== Chile ===
On 31 August 2018, Lemoine was announced as the head coach of Chile. His first set of match game not to long after, when Chile played a South American XV losing 38–21 and then an historic first match against the Māori All Blacks losing 73–0.

His first win in charge of Chile came midway through 2019 - after nine losses - beating Paraguay 53–10 during the 2019 South American Six Nations, which ended up being the only win in 2019.

With limited games in 2020 due to the COVID-19 pandemic, Pablo Lemoine's Chile returned to the international arena in 2021 as part of the 2023 Rugby World Cup qualifiers. After finishing second in the opening stage behind Uruguay in July 2021, Chile later defeated Canada and then the United States to earn an historic qualification for the 2023 Rugby World Cup as Americas 2.

As part of the development for Chile ahead of the World Cup, an historic European tour in November 2023 was secured, with matches against Romania and Tonga; which saw Chile lose both tests.

The World Cup saw Chile lose all their games, losing to Japan (42–12), Samoa (43–10), England (71–0) and Argentina (59–5).

In 2024, Chile continued to receive support from World Rugby to aid in development ahead of an expanded 2027 Rugby World Cup, with a historic three-test incoming tour in July, with victories over Hong Kong and Belgium and a loss to Scotland in an historic first encounter.

Chile later went onto earn an historic first win over Argentina XV, and win all of their matches in the opening stage of the 2027 Rugby World Cup qualification process.

=== Honours ===
Uruguay

- South American Rugby Championship
  - Winners: 2014
  - Runners-up: 2012, 2013, 2015
- CONSUR Cup
  - Runners-up: 2014, 2015
- World Rugby Nations Cup
  - Third: 2014

Sporting positions
Preceded by (Uruguay) Sebastián Piñeyrúa	Uruguay National Rugby Union Coach; 2012–2015	Succeeded by (Argentina) Esteban Meneses
Preceded by (South Africa) Vuyo Zangqa (Caretaker)	Germany National Rugby Union Coach; 2018	Succeeded by (England) Mike Ford
Preceded by (New Zealand) Mark Cross	Chile National Rugby Union Coach; 2018–	Succeeded by Incumbent
