= 2011 IRB Junior World Rugby Trophy =

Tournament details
- Host nation: Georgia
- Dates: May 24 – June 5
- No. of nations: 8

Final positions
- Champions: Samoa
- Runner-up: Japan

Tournament statistics
- Matches played: 16
- Attendance: 37,270 (2,329 per match)
- Top scorer(s): Bakhva Kobakhidze (GEO)
- Most tries: Robert Lilomaiava (SAM)

The 2011 IRB Junior World Rugby Trophy was the fourth IRB Junior World Rugby Trophy, an annual international rugby union competition for Under-20 national teams, second-tier world championship. The event was organised by rugby's governing body, the International Rugby Board (IRB). Two venues were used, both located in Tbilisi. 12 of the 16 games were played at the Avchala Stadium, the other four games at the Shevardeni Stadium.

== Pool stage ==
All times are local (UTC+4).

=== Pool A ===
Team	Pld	W	D	L	TF	PF	PA	PD	BP	Pts
Samoa	3	3	0	0	21	135	31	+104	3	15
Uruguay	3	2	0	1	7	72	47	+25	1	9
Russia	3	1	0	2	8	61	119	−58	1	5
United States	3	0	0	3	7	52	123	−71	2	2

24 May 2011
14:00

Samoa	48 – 11	United States
Try: Vaiomanu 3'; Tuiletufuga 9', 50'; Lilomaiava 15', 66', 74'; Alofipo 20'; Faavae 53'; Con: Fa'apale (3/7)	Report	Try: Hughes 60'; Con: Cowley (0/1); Pen: Magie (1/1) 28'; Drop: Magie (1/1) 11'

Avchala Stadium, Tbilisi
Attendance: 1,000
Referee: Radu Petrescu (Romania)

24 May 2011
16:00

Russia	5 – 33	Uruguay
Try: Simplikevich 57'; Con: Kukishev (0/1)	Report	Try: Favaro 10'; Duran 17'; Berchesi 72'; Con: Ormaechea (3/3); Pen: Ormaechea (3/3) 38', 40', 79'; Drop: Berchesi (1/2) 35'

Avchala Stadium, Tbilisi
Attendance: 1,800
Referee: Taizo Hirabayashi (Japan)

28 May 2011
14:00

Samoa	37 – 6	Uruguay
Try: Faavae 9', 16'; Fa'apale 28'; Taufua 47'; Vaiomanu 56'; Lilomaiava 77'; Con: Fa'apale (2/4); Pen: Fa'apale (1/1) 2'	Report	Pen: Ormaechea (1/2) 42; Drop: Berchesi (1/1) 5'

Shevardeni Stadium, Tbilisi
Attendance: 550
Referee: Taizo Hirabayashi (Japan)

28 May 2011
16:00

Russia	42 – 36	United States
Try: Simplikevich 18', 26', 44'; Pochechuev 58'; Vasiliev 67'; Con: Godlyuk (4/5); Pen: Godlyuk (3/3) 4', 12', 71'	Report	Try: Oliver 23'; Jones 48'; Hughes 50'; Cowley 60'; Magie 78'; Con: Cowley (4/5); Pen: Cowley (1/2) 32'

Avchala Stadium, Tbilisi
Attendance: 1,500
Referee: Tui Komiti (Samoa)

1 June 2011
14:00

Uruguay	33 – 5	United States
Try: Del Cerro 6'; Prada 34'; Lammana 55'; Benhayon 70'; Con: Berchesi (2/4); Pen: Berchesi (3/5) 13', 21', 28'	Report	Try: Magie 25'; Con: Cowley (0/1); Pen: Cowley (0/1)

Avchala Stadium, Tbilisi
Attendance: 900
Referee: Tui Komiti (Samoa)

1 June 2011
16:00

Samoa	50 – 14	Russia
Try: Lilomaiava 3', 7', 40', 46'; Iosua 57'; Sua 61'; Fa'afou 75'; Con: Fa'apale (1/2); Faavae (1/4); Poliko (1/1); Pen: Fa'apale (3/3) 33', 37', 41	Report	Try: Tolmachev 12'; Simplikevich 50'; Con: Godlyuk (2/2); Pen: Godlyuk (0/2); Yamschikov (0/1)

Avchala Stadium, Tbilisi
Attendance: 1,700
Referee: Radu Petrescu (Romania)

=== Pool B ===
Team	Pld	W	D	L	TF	PF	PA	PD	BP	Pts
Japan	3	3	0	0	13	96	53	+43	3	15
Georgia	3	2	0	1	12	102	57	+45	2	10
Canada	3	1	0	2	10	73	91	−18	1	5
Zimbabwe	3	0	0	3	8	66	136	−70	0	0

24 May 2011
14:00

Japan	37 – 24	Zimbabwe
Try: Murakawa 6'; Uchida 14'; Hano 38'; Vaifu 54'; Kim 65'; Con: Nakamura (3/5); Pen: Nakamura (2/2) 12', 37'	Report	Try: Tela 47'; Chiwanza 73'; Coetzee 80'; Con: Nelson (3/3); Pen: Nelson (1/1) 2'

Shevardeni Stadium, Tbilisi
Attendance: 200
Referee: Tim Luscombe (United States)

24 May 2011
18:00

Georgia	38 – 9	Canada
Try: Chilachava 48'; Tkhilaishvili 58'; Mikautadze 73'; Zhvania 83'; Con: Kobakhidze (3/4); Pen: Kobakhidze (4/4) 4', 8', 16', 39'	Report	Pen: Underwood (3/4) 29', 44', 57'

Avchala Stadium, Tbilisi
Attendance: 2,000
Referee: Tui Komiti (Samoa)

28 May 2011
14:00

Japan	30 – 15	Canada
Try: Enoki 17'; Hikosaka 26', 40+2'; Kurosawa 47'; Noda 80'; Con: Nakamura (1/5); Pen: Nakamura (1/1) 52'	Report	Try: Hassler 5', 33'; Ardron 68'; Con: Underwood (0/3); Pen: Underwood (0/1)

Avchala Stadium, Tbilisi
Attendance: 1,300
Referee: Tim Luscombe (United States)

28 May 2011
18:00

Georgia	50 – 19	Zimbabwe
Try: Losaberidze 3'; Chilachava 19', 60'; Bitsadze 40'; Dzneladze 46'; Tkesheliadze 57', 78'; Con: Kobakhidze (5/6); Pen: Kobakhidze (1/1) 54'; Drop: Kobakhidze (0/1)	Report	Try: Coles 30'; Chiwanza 41'; Con: Nelson (0/2); Pen: Nelson (2/2) 10', 36'; Drop: Nelson (1/1) 7'

Avchala Stadium, Tbilisi
Attendance: 2,000
Referee: Joaquín Montes (Uruguay)

1 June 2011
14:00

Canada	49 – 23	Zimbabwe
Try: Hassler 30', 46'; Fuailefau 56'; Pierce 61'; Ardron 68'; Nel 72'; Tennant 77'; Con: Ferguson (2/2); Hamstra (5/5); Pen: Ferguson (0/1); Hamstra (0/1)	Report	Try: Jiji 48', 64'; Coles 39'; Con: Linfield (0/1); Nelson (1/1); Pen: Jiji (0/1); Linfield (2/3) 37', 44'; Tshuma (0/1)

Shevardeni Stadium, Tbilisi
Attendance: 250
Referee: Taizo Hirabayashi (Japan)

1 June 2011
18:00

Georgia	14 – 29	Japan
Try: Navrozashvili 60'; Con: Mchedlishvili 0/1; Pen: Kobakhidze (3/5) 16', 28', 39'	Report	Try: Hikosaka 10'; Hano 53'; Hikosaka 77'; Con: Nakamura (1/3); Pen: Nakamura (4/4) 2', 5', 32', 65'

Avchala Stadium, Tbilisi
Attendance: 2,170
Referee: Joaquín Montes (Uruguay)

== Knockout stage ==
=== 7th place game ===
5 June 2011
13:30

United States	30 – 29	Zimbabwe
Try: Metcalf 29'; Jones 34'; So'oalo 43'; Mullen; Con: Cowley (2/4); Pen: Cowley (2/3) 3', 77'	Report	Try: Linfield 9'; Chikaka 36'; Coles 61'; Mandiwanza 79'; Con: Linfield (2/3); Jiji (1/1); Pen: Linfield (0/2); Jiji (1/2) 35'

Shevardeni Stadium, Tbilisi
Attendance: 300
Referee: Radu Petrescu (Romania)

=== 5th place game ===
5 June 2011
13:30

Russia	24 – 49	Canada
Try: Pochechuev 10'; Tolmachev 42'; Godlyuk 56'; Sel'skiy 70'; Con: Kukishev (1/1); Godlyuk (1/3)	Report	Try: Hamstra 4', 24'; Ardron 8'; Pierce 20'; Hassler 30', 39'; Con: Underwood (4/6); Hamstra (0/1); Pen: Underwood (2/2) 35', 44'

Avchala Stadium, Tbilisi
Attendance: 1,000
Referee: Tim Luscombe (United States)

=== Third place game ===
5 June 2011
15:45

Uruguay	15 – 20	Georgia
Pen: Berchesi (4/5) 20', 24', 43', 55'; Drop: Rodrigo Silva (1/1) 48'; Berchesi (0/1)	Report	Try: Chilachava 28'; Mchedlishvili 36'; Con: Kobakhidze (2/2); Pen: Kobakhidze (2/3) 6', 9'

Avchala Stadium, Tbilisi
Attendance: 1,600
Referee: Taizo Hirabayashi (Japan)

=== Final ===
5 June 2011
18:00

Samoa	31 – 24	Japan
Try: Taufua 25'; Lilomaiava 29'; Faavae 32'; Alauni 59'; Schuster 76'; Con: Fa'apale (3/5); Pen: Fa'apale (0/2)	Report	Try: Hikosaka 5'; Hikosaka 12'; Enoki 63'; Con: Nakamura (3/3); Pen: Nakamura (1/1) 20'

Avchala Stadium, Tbilisi
Attendance: 1,900
Referee: Joaquín Montes (Uruguay)
