= 2015 South American Rugby Championship "A" =

- Date: April 11 – May 9, 2015
- Countries: Brazil; Chile; Paraguay; Uruguay

Final positions
- Champions: Chile (1st title)

Tournament statistics
- Matches played: 6
- Tries scored: 35 (5.83 per match)
- Top scorer(s): (Uruguay) Jerónimo Etcheverry (49)
- Most tries: (Uruguay) Jerónimo Etcheverry (4)

The 2015 South American Rugby Championship (Confederación Sudamericana de Rugby (CONSUR) Championship) Division A was the second edition of the newly formatted South American Rugby Championship, which included promotion and relegation. CONSUR chose not to elect a host country or city, opting instead to spread the tournament around South America. For Uruguay, the tournament acted as preparation matches ahead of their appearance in the 2015 Rugby World Cup, their first since 2003. In addition to this, on 23 April, Uruguay took a week out of this tournament, to host a friendly match against the USA Select side.

Chile were the champions following their victory over 2015 Rugby World Cup participants Uruguay. This was the first time Chile had won the South American Rugby Championship.

== Standings ==
Contested CONSUR Cup in 2016
Relegation playoff vs CONSUR B 2014 Champion

Place	Nation	Games				Points			Table points
Place	Nation	Played	Won	Drawn	Lost	For	Against	Diff	Table points
1	Chile (29)	3	3	0	0	97	43	+54	9
2	Uruguay (20)	3	2	0	1	140	42	+98	6
3	Paraguay (38)	3	1	0	2	48	123	–75	3
4	Brazil (35)	3	0	0	3	23	100	–77	0

Pre-tournament rankings are in parentheses.

== Matches ==
The dates and venues were announced on 7 April.

=== Week 1 ===
11 April 2015
16:00 UYT (UTC-03)

Uruguay	77–3	Paraguay
Try: Agustín Alonso 1' c Francisco Bulanti 4' c Jerónimo Etcheverry (2) 14' c, 28' c Oscar Durán 20' c Santiago Gibernau (2) 35' c, 52' c Alberto Román 37' c Germán Kessler 56' c Carlos Arboleya 61' c Leandro Leivas 80' c Con: Jerónimo Etcheverry (11/11) 1', 5', 15', 22', 29', 35', 38', 53', 58', 62', 80'	Report	Pen: Gerard Cuttier (1/1) 68'

Estadio Charrúa, Montevideo
Referee: Henrique Platais (Brazil)

=== Week 2 ===
18 April 2015
16:00 UYT (UTC-03)

Uruguay	48–9	Brazil
Try: Manuel Blengio 17' m Rodrigo Silva 39' c Santiago Gibernau (2) 69' c, 76' m Agustin Alonso 75' c Alejo Durán 80' m Con: Jerónimo Etcheverry (1/2) 39'; Manuel Blengio (2/4) 69', 75'; Pen: Jerónimo Etcheverry (4/4) 1', 31', 59', 65'	Report	Pen: Rafael Morales (3/3) 6', 26', 29'

Estadio Charrúa, Montevideo
Referee: Jason Mola (Argentina)

=== Week 3 ===
25 April 2015
14:00 CLST (UTC-03)

Chile	32–3	Brazil
Try: Ítalo Zunino 68' c Francisco Hurtado 79' c Con: Javier Valderrama (2/2) 69', 80'; Pen: Javier Valderrama (5/5) 4', 20', 23', 26', 62'; Drop: Cristian Onetto (1/1) 34'	Report	Pen: Rafael Morales (1/2) 30'

Parque Mahuida, Santiago
Referee: Alejandro Longres (Uruguay)

=== Week 4 ===
3 May 2015
21:00 PYT (UTC-02)

Paraguay	25–35	Chile
Try: Carlos Bareiro (2) 16' m, 22' c Hugo Chávez 30' c Con: Sergio Alvarenga (2/3) 23', 32'; Pen: Sergio Alvarenga (2/2) 35', 58'		Try: Agustín Fernandez 2' c Matías Cabrera 19' c Ramón Ayarza 40' c Juan Pablo Perrota 47' m Con: Javier Valderrama (3/4) 3', 20', 40'; Pen: Javier Valderrama (3/5) 44', 51', 63'

Parque Olímpico, Asunción

=== Week 5 ===
9 May 2015
13:00 BRST (UTC-02)

Brazil	11–17	Paraguay
Try: Mateus Estrela Tavares 16' m Pen: Mateus Estrela Tavares (1/2) 7'; Matheus Daniel (1/1) 69'	Report	Try: Sérgio Alvarenga 38' c Alejandro Montiel 46' c Con: Sérgio Alvarenga (2/2) 39', 47'; Pen: Sérgio Alvarenga (2/4) 43', 77'

Estádio das Montanhas, Bento Gonçalves
Referee: Claudio Antonio (Argentina)

9 May 2015
14:00 CLST (UTC-03)

Chile	30–15	Uruguay
Try: Cristian Onetto 8' c Juan Pablo Perrotta 37' c Italo Zunino 54' c Con: Javier Valderrama (3/3) 8', 38', 55'; Pen: Francisco Urroz (1/1) 14'; Javier Valderrama (2/2) 21', 35'	Report	Try: Joaquín Prada 4' m Penalty try 69' c Con: Alejo Durán (1/1) 70'; Pen: Jerónimo Etcheverry (1/1) 40'

Parque Mahuida, Santiago
Referee: Mauro Rivera (Argentina)

== Relegation playoff ==
12 December 2015

Brazil	44 - 0	Colombia

São Paulo

== See also ==
- 2015 CONSUR Cup
