= Hourcade =

Hourcade is a French surname. Notable people with the surname include:

- Bertrand Hourcade (1950–2021), Swiss writer and professor
- Daniel Hourcade (born 1958), Argentine rugby union coach
