= 2014 South American Rugby Championship "A" =

- Date: April 26 – May 10, 2014
- Countries: Brazil; Chile; Paraguay; Uruguay

Final positions
- Champions: Uruguay (2nd title)

Tournament statistics
- Matches played: 6
- Tries scored: 37 (6.17 per match)
- Top scorer(s): (Paraguay) Sergio Alvarenga (34)
- Most tries: 5 Player with 2 tries

The 2014 South American Rugby Championship (Confederación Sudamericana de Rugby (CONSUR) Championship) Division A was the first edition of the newly formatted South American Rugby Championship, which included promotion and relegation. Unlike in previous years, a host country or city was not chosen; rather, CONSUR opted to spread the tournament around South America. This was the first time since 1981 that Argentina did not compete, due to the new format of the competition.

== Changes from 2013 ==
- An additional level above CONSUR Division A was added, with Argentina only competing in the 2014 CONSUR Cup.
- Paraguay was promoted from 2013 South American Rugby Championship "B".
- The top two teams from CONSUR A in 2014 would play in the 2015 CONSUR Cup.

== Standings ==
Contested CONSUR Cup in 2015

Place	Nation	Games				Points			Table points
Place	Nation	Played	Won	Drawn	Lost	For	Against	Diff	Table points
1	Uruguay (20)	3	3	0	0	123	32	+91	9
2	Paraguay (38)	3	1	0	2	59	80	–21	3
3	Brazil (37)	3	1	0	2	57	81	–24	3
4	Chile (28)	3	1	0	2	51	97	–46	3

Pre-tournament rankings are in parentheses.

== Matches ==
The dates and venues were announced on 23 April.

=== Round 1 ===
26 April 2014
16:00 PYT (UTC-04)

Paraguay	10–34	Uruguay
Try: Sergio Alvarenga 1' c Con: Sergio Alvarenga (1/1) 2'; Pen: Sergio Alvarenga (1/3) 19'	Report	Try: Federico Favaro (2) 15' c, 46' c Mathías Braun 35' m Alejo Durán 63' m Gabriel Puig 77' c Con: Federico Favaro (3/5) 15', 47', 78'; Pen: Federico Favaro (1/2) 40'

Yacht y Golf Club, Asunción
Referee: Ricardo Sant’Anna (Brazil)

26 April 2014
19:00 BRT (UTC-03)

Brazil	24–16	Chile
Try: Penalty try (2) 30' c, 46' c João Luiz da Ros 68' c Con: Leandro Amaral (1/1) 31'; Pedro Di Pilla (1/1) 46'; Lucas Tranquez (1/1) 68'; Pen: Pedro Di Pilla (1/1) 40'	Report	Try: Roberto Oyarzún 46' m Francisco Fernandez 69' m Pen: Matías Nordenflycht (2/2) 13', 19'

Arena Barueri, São Paulo
Referee: Mauro Rivera (Argentina)

=== Round 2 ===
3 May 2014
14:00 BRT (UTC-03)

Brazil	9–34	Uruguay
Pen: Leandro Castiglione (3/4) 17', 39', 51'	Report	Try: Penalty try 12' c Franco Lamanna (2) 19' c, 25' m Juan Etcheverría 71' m Gabriel Puig 80+5' c Con: Alejo Durán (2/2) 12', 20'; Joaquín Prada (1/2) 80+6'; Pen: Joaquín Prada (1/1) 67'

Estádio das Montanhas, Bento Gonçalves
Referee: Felipe Balbontín (Chile)

3 May 2014
15:00 CLT (UTC-04)

Chile	22–18	Paraguay
Try: Italo Zunino 7' m Juan Pablo Larenas 54' c Benjamín Soto 65' c Con: Matías Nordenflycht (2/3) 55', 66'; Pen: Matías Nordenflycht (1/1) 70'	Report	Try: Eymard Brizuela 3' m Juan Gavigan 78' c Con: Sergio Alvarenga (1/2) 79'; Pen: Sergio Alvarenga (2/2) 18', 25'

Campos Deportivos Saint Johns, Concepción
Referee: Joaquín Montes (Uruguay)

=== Round 3 ===
10 May 2014
15:45 UYT (UTC-03)

Uruguay	55–13	Chile
Try: Joaquín Prada 4' c Juan de Freitas 60' m Rodrigo Silva (2) 41' m, 65' m Juan Gaminara 45' m Mathías Braun 50' m Nicolás Klappenbach 56' c Leandro Leivas 80' m Con: Alejo Durán (1/5) 5'; Matías Arocena (1/3) 57'; Pen: Alejo Durán (1/3) 10'	Report	Try: Martín Fernández 47' m Hernán Amigo 78'm Pen: Matías Nordenflycht (1/2) 67'

Estadio Charrúa, Montevideo
Referee: Ignacio Iparraguirre (Argentina)

10 May 2014
16:00 PYT (UTC-04)

Paraguay	31–24	Brazil
Try: Martín Ortiz 29' c Leonardo Glitz 54' m Gustavo Zárate 71' c Con: Sergio Alvarenga (2/3) 30', 73'; Pen: Sergio Alvarenga (4/4) 10', 27', 37', 42'	Report	Try: Luis Lesme 47' c Lucas Tranquez 50' c Penalty try 63' c Con: Pedro Di Pilla (3/3) 48', 51', 63'; Pen: Leandro Castiglioni (1/2) 6'

Yacht y Golf Club, Asunción
Referee: Jason Mola (Argentina)

== See also ==
- 2014 CONSUR Cup
- 2014 South American Rugby Championship "B"
- 2014 South American Rugby Championship "C"
