= 2014 CONSUR Cup =

- Date: May 17 – May 25, 2014
- Countries: Argentina; Chile; Uruguay

The 2014 CONSUR Cup was the inaugural year of the top division of Confederación Sudamericana de Rugby. Argentina were automatic seeds into the competition, with the top two teams from the 2013 South American Rugby Championship "A"; Chile and Uruguay playing alongside Los Pumas.

== Standings ==
Place	Nation	Games				Points			Table points
Place	Nation	Played	Won	Drawn	Lost	For	Against	Diff	Table points
1	Argentina (9)	2	2	0	0	138	21	117	6
2	Uruguay (20)	2	1	0	1	64	78	-14	3
3	Chile (27)	2	0	0	2	25	128	-103	0

Pre-tournament rankings are in parentheses. Chile's and Uruguay's rankings were as of 12 May 2014.

== Matches ==
The dates and venues were announced on 23 April.

=== Round 1 ===
10 May 2014
15:45 UYT (UTC-03)

Uruguay	55–13	Chile
Try: Joaquín Prada 4' c Juan de Freitas 60' m Rodrigo Silva (2) 41' m, 65' m Juan Manuel Gaminara 45' m Mathías Braun 50' m Nicolás Klappenbach 56' c Leandro Leivas 80' m Con: Alejo Durán (1/5) 5'; Matías Arocena (1/3) 57'; Pen: Alejo Durán (1/3) 10'	Report	Try: Martín Fernández 47' m Hernán Amigo 78'm Pen: Matías Nordenflycht (1/2) 67'

Estadio Charrúa, Montevideo
Referee: Ignacio Iparraguirre (Argentina)

=== Round 2 ===
17 May 2014
15:45 UYT (UTC-03)

Uruguay	9-65	Argentina

Parque Artigas, Paysandú

=== Round 3 ===
25 May 2014
15:00 CLT (UTC-04)

Chile	12-73	Argentina

Estadio San Carlos de Apoquindo, Santiago

== See also ==
- 2014 South American Rugby Championship "A"
