= Daniel Hourcade =

- Born: Daniel Hourcade; 7 June 1958 (age 68) San Miguel de Tucumán, Tucumán, Argentina

Rugby union career
- Position: Scrum-half
Senior career
Years	Team	Apps	(Points)
1979-1992	Uni Tucumán		
Coaching career
- Years: Team
- 1993-2001: Uni Tucumán
- 2001: Argentina U21
- 2001-2004: Argentina Sevens
- 2002-2003: Huirapuca
- 2004-2008: Grupo Desportivo Direito
- 2004-2006: Portugal Sevens
- 2006-2007: Portugal (Assistant coach)
- 2008: Portugal Women's
- 2008-2009: Stade Rouennais
- 2010-2013: Argentina Jaguars
- 2010-2013: Pampas XV
- 2013-2018: Argentina
- Correct as of 20 October 2025

Daniel Hourcade (born San Miguel de Tucumán, 1958) is an Argentine rugby union coach and former player. He has coached at various levels of the game, at both club and international level. He has coached in Argentina, France and Portugal, and was head coach of the Argentine national team having come through the ranks with the sevens national team, Argentina Jaguars and Pampas XV.

== Career ==
He had a brief player career at the Universitario Rugby Club de Tucumán. He began his coaching career in 1993 where he worked up the coaching ranks in the Universitario Rugby Club de Tucumán side. This included a three-year tenure as the head coach of the Senior side. He left the Tucumán side to become head coach of the Argentina Under-21 side before being named head coach of the Argentina sevens side between 2001 and 2004.

Hourcade left the Argentine Rugby Union (UAR) in 2004 to take up the role of head coach of Portuguese domestic club Grupo Desportivo Direito. This role was on a par with his duties as head coach of Portugal sevens side and assistant head coach of the Portugal national side - which was his role through Portugal's first appearance in the 2007 Rugby World Cup. He finished his stint in Portugal in 2008 following his stint as head coach for the Portugal women's national rugby union team. Hourcade also had a brief stint in France when he coached Stade Rouennais in the Fédérale 2 league.

Hourcade returned to the UAR in 2010 when he became the head coach of the Argentina Jaguars, where he led the Jaguars to four consecutive championships in the Americas Rugby Championship and led the team to second in the IRB Nations Cup. He also led the team to numerous victories over test sides including a 2-0 test series win over Russia in 2010.

=== Pampas XV ===
In 2010, he became the first coach of the newly formed side Pampas XV, a team that was based in South Africa that would compete annually in the Vodacom Cup. In the 2010 Vodacom Cup, Pampas finished fifth, just outside the play-off positioning. However, in the 2011 Vodacom Cup, Hourcade led the side to top of the Southern Section table with 8 from 8 victories, he led the Pampas XV to the final. His side would have to face the defending champions the Blue Bulls who lost 14-9 on this occasion. However, in 2012 he was unable to retain the title, losing in the Quarter finals to Griquas 26–18. In the Pampas final appearance in the Vodacom Cup in 2013, they again only made it as far as the Quarter finals, losing 44–37 to Pumas.

=== Argentina national coach ===
In October 2013, his Argentina coaching career reached its apex when he was announced as head coach for the national senior side for the 2013 end-of-year rugby union tests through to the 2015 Rugby World Cup. His first match in charge was against England on 9 November 2013, losing 31–12. A week later, Argentina lost to Wales 40–6, which was Wales' largest ever win over the Pumas, however, Hourcade earned his first victory as coach against Italy on 23 November 2013, winning 19–14 at the Stadio Olimpico in Rome.

In May 2014, he revived his first silverware, having won all the matches in the 2014 CONSUR Cup, defeating Uruguay, 65–9, and Chile, 73–12. In June 2014, Argentina contested the Admiral Brown Cup, a trophy contested between Argentina and Ireland. Ireland claimed the trophy having won both matches 29–17 and 23–17 respectively. During the 2014 Rugby Championship, Argentina suffered several close defeats - losing 13–6 and 31–33 to South Africa home and away, but on 5 October 2014, Hourcade guided Argentina to their first ever win in the Rugby Championship, defeating Australia 21-17 at the Estadio Malvinas Argentinas in Mendoza. Not only was this their first win in the Rugby Champions, but it was their first win over Australia in 17 years. Despite that win, Argentina finished in last place in the Rugby Championship for the third consecutive year.

During their 2014 end-of-year tour, Hourcade led Argentina to two victories from three. Their only loss was to Scotland, 41–31. They did however defeat Italy 20–18 and France 18–13 - Argentina's first win over France in France since 2007.

In 2015, he led the team (acting as Argentina Jaguars) to two consecutive uncapped wins over the USA Selects in April, before guiding the national XV side to their second consecutive CONSUR Cup, with wins over Uruguay and Paraguay respectively. However, on 27 May just 4 days after clinching the CONSUR Cup, he led the Argentina Jaguars side to a narrow 21–23 defeat to the Fiji Warriors. During the 2015 Rugby Championship, Hourcade led Argentina to third, the first time they hadn't finished in bottom place. Haven lost to New Zealand in the opening round 39–18, then to Australia 34–9 in Argentina's only home match of the Championship, Argentina went into the final round against South Africa on 0 points. However, Hourcade led Argentina to their first ever victory over South Africa winning 37–25.

During the 2015 Rugby World Cup, Hourcade led Argentina to fourth. Haven only lost to New Zealand in their group, 26–16, despite leading 12–11 at half time, they went on to finish second in Pool C with victories over Georgia 54–9, Tonga 45–16, and Namibia 64–19. Argentina had scored the most points than any other team during the pool stage, and their attacking rugby continued when they beat Ireland 43–20 in the quarter-final, which was their first victory over Ireland since 2007, while setting a new record for biggest winning margin over the Irish. They faced Australia in the semi-final, however, Argentina failed to capitalize on opportunities and failed to score in their 29–15 defeat. 5 days later, Hourcade led Argentina to fourth in the world, losing to South Africa in the Bronze final 24–13.

In the 2016 June international window, Hourcade led Argentina to a 30–24 victory over Italy in a one-off test. He drew their test series with France 1–all, having won the first test 30–19, but lose the second test 27–0. The second test was the first time Argentina had failed to score any points in a test match since they lost 16–0 against Ireland in 2007. It was the first time they have failed to score any points against France since their first ever meeting in 1949. During the 2016 Rugby Championship, Hourcade led Argentina to their first ever home victory over South Africa, defeating the Springboks 26–24 in Salta during the second round of the Championship. However, this was their only victory of the Championship, as alongside their first round loss to South Africa, Argentina went onto lose their 4 remaining games against Australia and New Zealand. In a first ever meeting between Argentina and Japan since 2005, Hourcade led Argentina to a 54–20 victory against a side that had 13 debutantes, before going onto play Wales, Scotland and England, all resulting in a loss; 24–20, 19–16 and 27–14.

In June 2017, Argentina lost 2–0 to an inexperienced English side, losing both tests 38–34 and 35–25. Hourcade did however lead his side to a 45–29 victory over a touring Georgian side on their Americas tour. The 2017 Rugby Championship saw Argentina finish bottom of the table, after losing all six games and not recording a single bonus point - this is the first ever time they had done this, with 2013 being their previous worst Championship with only two points. Argentina started the competition with back-to-back loses to South Africa, 37–15 (away) and 23–41 (home). Their third-round game against New Zealand saw Argentina lead the All Blacks 16–15 at half time, and at the 60th minute the score was level at 22–all. However, substitutions were made on both sides and Argentina conceded 17 points in as many minutes to lose the game 39–22. In the fourth round, Argentina also lead Australia at half time, 13–10, but indiscipline and substitutions cost Argentina the game, losing 45–20. Despite being down 29–3 at half time at home to New Zealand, Hourcade's defensive systems pressured the All Blacks, and leading into overtime, New Zealand had still failed to score any points in the second half. However, a try at last play by newly capped David Havili saw New Zealand record a 36–10 victory. In the final round, Argentina once again led Australia 13–12 at half time, however Australia capitalized on defensive lapses to score three tries in the second half to see out the game 37–20. Argentina's poor form continued into the 2017 End-of-year tests, gaining just one win, coming against Italy 31–15. The other test were against England and Ireland, which were both defeats for Argentina, 21–8 and 28–19.

In June 2018, Hourcade led Argentina to back-to-back defeats to Wales, with the first test being a first loss at home to Wales since 2004. After losing the first test 23–10 in the two-test series, Hourcade made just one change to the starting XV ahead of the second test. Discipline proved an issue for the home side, who lost the test 30–12, conceding 12 penalties, seven of which were attempted kick at goal by the Welsh. Following the game, Hourcade announced his resignation as Pumas head coach, and that the test against Scotland the following week would be his last in charge. That game also ended in defeat, a record loss against Scotland at home, losing 44–15. The loss meant, Hourcade had won just 6 games in 28 games since the success of the 2015 Rugby World Cup.

==== International matches as head coach ====
Note: World Rankings Column shows the World Ranking Wales was placed at on the following Monday after each of their matches.

Matches (2013–2018)
Matches	Date	Opposition	Venue	Score (Arg.–Opponent)	Competition	Captain	World Ranking
2013
1	9 November	England	Twickenham Stadium, London	12–31	End-of-year tour	Juan Manuel Leguizamón	10th
2	16 November	Wales	Millennium Stadium, Cardiff	6–40	End-of-year tour	Juan Manuel Leguizamón	10th
3	23 November	Italy	Stadio Olimpico, Rome	19–14	End-of-year tour	Juan Manuel Leguizamón	10th
2014
4	17 May	Uruguay	Estadio Parque Artigas, Paysandú	65–9	CONSUR Cup	Tomás Cubelli	9th
5	25 May	Chile	Estadio San Carlos de Apoquindo, Santiago	73–12	CONSUR Cup	Martín Landajo	9th
6	7 June	Ireland	Estadio Centenario, Resistencia	17–29	Irish test series	Martín Landajo	9th
7	14 June	Ireland	Estadio Monumental José Fierro, Tucumán	17–23	Irish test series	Martín Landajo	12th
8	20 June	Scotland	Estadio Mario Alberto Kempes, Córdoba	19–21	Mid-year test	Tomás Cubelli	12th
9	16 August	South Africa	Loftus Versfeld Stadium, Pretoria	6–13	Rugby Championship	Agustín Creevy	12th
10	23 August	South Africa	Estadio Padre Ernesto Martearena, Salta	31–33	Rugby Championship	Agustín Creevy	12th
11	6 September	New Zealand	McLean Park, Napier	9–28	Rugby Championship	Agustín Creevy	12th
12	13 September	Australia	Cbus Super Stadium, Gold Coast	25–32	Rugby Championship	Agustín Creevy	12th
13	27 September	New Zealand	Estadio Ciudad de La Plata, La Plata	13–34	Rugby Championship	Agustín Creevy	12th
14	4 October	Australia	Estadio Malvinas Argentinas, Mendoza	21–17	Rugby Championship	Agustín Creevy	10th
15	8 November	Scotland	Murrayfield Stadium, Edinburgh	31–41	End-of-year tour	Agustín Creevy	10th
16	14 November	Italy	Stadio Luigi Ferraris, Genoa	20–18	End-of-year tour	Tomás Cubelli	9th
17	22 November	France	Stade de France, Saint-Denis	18–13	End-of-year tour	Agustín Creevy	9th
2015
18	16 May	Uruguay	Estadio Charrúa, Montevideo	36–14	CONSUR Cup	Martín Landajo	8th
19	23 May	Paraguay	Estadio Héroes de Curupaytí, Asunción	71–7	CONSUR Cup	Martín Landajo	8th
20	17 July	New Zealand	AMI Stadium, Christchurch	18–39	Rugby Championship	Agustín Creevy	8th
21	25 July	Australia	Estadio Malvinas Argentinas, Mendoza	9–34	Rugby Championship	Agustín Creevy	8th
22	8 August	South Africa	Growthpoint Kings Park, Durban	37–25	Rugby Championship	Agustín Creevy	8th
23	15 August	South Africa	Estadio José Amalfitani, Buenos Aires	12–26	2015 RWC warm-up	Agustín Creevy	8th
24	20 September	New Zealand	Wembley Stadium, London, England	16–26	2015 Rugby World Cup	Agustín Creevy	8th
25	25 September	Georgia	Kingsholm Stadium, Gloucester, England	54–9	2015 Rugby World Cup	Agustín Creevy	8th
26	4 October	Tonga	Leicester City Stadium, Leicester, England	45–16	2015 Rugby World Cup	Agustín Creevy	7th
27	11 October	Namibia	Leicester City Stadium, Leicester, England	64–19	2015 Rugby World Cup	Martín Landajo	6th
28	18 October	Ireland	Millennium Stadium, Cardiff, Wales	43–20	2015 Rugby World Cup	Agustín Creevy	4th
29	25 October	Australia	Twickenham Stadium, London, England	15–29	2015 Rugby World Cup	Agustín Creevy	4th
30	30 October	South Africa	Olympic Stadium, London, England	13–24	2015 Rugby World Cup	Nicolás Sánchez	4th
2016
31	11 June	Italy	Estadio B.G Estanislao López, Santa Fe	30–24	Mid year test	Agustín Creevy	5th
32	19 June	France	Estadio Monumental José Fierro, Tucumán	30–19	France test series	Agustín Creevy	5th
33	25 June	France	Estadio Monumental José Fierro, Tucumán	0–27	France test series	Agustín Creevy	9th
34	20 August	South Africa	Mbombela Stadium, Nelspruit	23–30	Rugby Championship	Agustín Creevy	9th
35	27 August	South Africa	Estadio Padre Ernesto Martearena, Salta	26–24	Rugby Championship	Agustín Creevy	7th
36	10 September	New Zealand	Waikato Stadium, Hamilton	22–57	Rugby Championship	Agustín Creevy	7th
37	17 September	Australia	nib Stadium, Perth	20–36	Rugby Championship	Agustín Creevy	7th
38	1 October	New Zealand	River Plate Stadium, Buenos Aires	17–36	Rugby Championship	Agustín Creevy	7th
39	8 October	Australia	Twickenham Stadium, London, England	21–33	Rugby Championship	Agustín Creevy	7th
40	5 November	Japan	Chichibunomiya Rugby Stadium, Tokyo	54–20	End-of-year tour	Agustín Creevy	6th
41	12 November	Wales	Principality Stadium, Cardiff	20–24	End-of-year tour	Agustín Creevy	8th
42	19 November	Scotland	Murrayfield Stadium, Edinburgh	16–19	End-of-year tour	Agustín Creevy	9th
43	26 November	England	Twickenham Stadium, London	14–27	End-of-year tour	Agustín Creevy	9th
2017
44	10 June	England	Estadio Bicentenario, San Juan	34–38	English test series	Agustín Creevy	9th
45	17 June	England	Estadio B.G Estanislao López, Santa Fe	25–35	English test series	Agustín Creevy	9th
46	24 June	Georgia	Estadio 23 de Agosto, Jujuy	45–29	Mid year test	Agustín Creevy	9th
47	19 August	South Africa	Nelson Mandela Bay Stadium, Port Elizabeth	15–37	Rugby Championship	Agustín Creevy	10th
48	26 August	South Africa	Estadio Padre Ernesto Martearena, Salta	23–41	Rugby Championship	Agustín Creevy	10th
49	9 September	New Zealand	Yarrow Stadium, New Plymouth	22–39	Rugby Championship	Agustín Creevy	10th
50	16 September	Australia	GIO Stadium Canberra, Canberra	20–45	Rugby Championship	Agustín Creevy	10th
51	30 September	New Zealand	Estadio José Amalfitani, Buenos Aires	10–36	Rugby Championship	Agustín Creevy	10th
52	7 October	Australia	Estadio Malvinas Argentinas, Mendoza	20–37	Rugby Championship	Agustín Creevy	10th
53	11 November	England	Twickenham Stadium, London	8–21	End-of-year tour	Agustín Creevy	10th
54	18 November	Italy	Stadio Artemio Franchi, Florence	31–15	End-of-year tour	Agustín Creevy	9th
55	25 November	Ireland	Aviva Stadium, Dublin	19–28	End-of-year tour	Agustín Creevy	8th
2018
56	9 June	Wales	Estadio Bicentenario, San Juan	10–23	Welsh test series	Agustín Creevy	10th
57	17 June	Wales	Estadio B.G Estanislao López, Santa Fe	12–30	Welsh test series	Agustín Creevy	10th
58	23 June	Scotland	Estadio Centenario, Resistencia	15–44	Mid year test	Agustín Creevy	10th

==== Record by country ====
Opponent	Played	Won	Drew	Lost	Win ratio (%)	For	Against
Australia	8	1	0	7	12.50%	151	263
Chile	1	1	0	0	100%	73	12
England	5	0	0	5	0%	93	152
France	3	2	0	1	66.67%	48	59
Georgia	2	2	0	0	100%	99	38
Ireland	4	1	0	3	25%	96	100
Italy	4	4	0	0	100%	100	71
Japan	1	1	0	0	100%	54	20
Namibia	1	1	0	0	100%	64	19
New Zealand	8	0	0	8	0%	127	295
Paraguay	1	1	0	0	100%	71	7
Scotland	4	0	0	4	0%	81	125
South Africa	9	2	0	7	22.22%	186	253
Tonga	1	1	0	0	100%	45	16
Uruguay	2	2	0	0	100%	101	23
Wales	4	0	0	4	0%	48	117
TOTAL	58	19	0	38	32.76%	1437	1570

=== Honours ===
- CONSUR Cup
  - Winners: 2014, 2015
- Killik Cup
  - Winner: 2015

== Other honours ==
Pampas XV

- Vodacom Cup
  - Winners: 2011

Argentina Jaguars

- Americas Rugby Championship
  - Winners: 2010, 2012
- World Rugby Nations Cup
  - Runners-up: 2012

Preceded by Santiago Phelan	Argentina rugby union coach 2013 – 2018	Succeeded by Mario Ledesma
