= 2015 CONSUR Cup =

- Date: May 11 – May 23, 2015
- Countries: Argentina; Paraguay; Uruguay

Final positions
- Champions: Argentina (2nd title)

Tournament statistics
- Matches played: 3
- Tries scored: 30 (10 per match)

The 2015 CONSUR Cup was the second year of the top division of Confederación Sudamericana de Rugby. Argentina were automatic seeds into the competition, with the top two teams from the 2014 South American Rugby Championship "A", Paraguay and Uruguay, playing alongside Los Pumas. For the second consecutive year, Argentina won the tournament, remaining as the top South American side.

== Standings ==
Place	Nation	Games				Points			Table points
Place	Nation	Played	Won	Drawn	Lost	For	Against	Diff	Table points
1	Argentina	2	2	0	0	107	21	+86	6
2	Uruguay	2	1	0	1	91	39	+52	3
3	Paraguay	2	0	0	2	10	148	–138	0

== Matches ==
The dates and venues were announced on 5 May.

=== Round 1 ===
11 April 2015
16:00 UYT (UTC-03)

Uruguay	77–3	Paraguay
Try: Agustín Alonso 1' c Francisco Bulanti 4' c Jerónimo Etcheverry (2) 14' c, 28' c Oscar Durán 20' c Santiago Gibernau (2) 35' c, 52' c Alberto Román 37' c Germán Kessler 56' c Carlos Arboleya 61' c Leandro Leivas 80' c Con: Jerónimo Etcheverry (11/11) 1', 5', 15', 22', 29', 35', 38', 53', 58', 62', 80'	Report	Pen: Gerard Cuttier (1/1) 68'

Estadio Charrúa, Montevideo
Referee: Henrique Platais (Brazil)

=== Round 2 ===
16 May 2015
15:30 UYT (UTC-03)

Uruguay	14–36	Argentina
Try: Leandro Leivas 56' m Pen: Jerónimo Etcheverry (3/3) 3', 17', 21'	Report	Try: Facundo Isa 9' m Martín Landajo 23' c Matías Cortese 26' m Penalty try 34' c Santiago González Iglesias 52' m Juan León Novillo 62' c Con: Santiago González Iglesias (3/6) 24', 34', 64'

Estadio Charrúa, Montevideo
Referee: Joaquín Montes (Uruguay)

=== Round 3 ===
23 May 2015
20:00

Paraguay	7–71	Argentina
Try: Juan Sebastián Ortiz 79' c Con: Gerard Cuttier (1/1) 80'	Report	Try: Santiago Cordero (3) 11' m, 30' c, 47' c Jerónimo de la Fuente (2) 16' m, 27' c Tomás Carrió 21' m Joaquín Paz 39' c Santiago Iglesias Valdez 44' c Julián Montoya 51' c Tomás Lezana 68' c Lisandro Ahualli de Chazal 73' c Con: Juan León Novillo (6/9) 28', 30', 40', 45', 48', 53'; Santiago González Iglesias (2/2) 69', 73'

Estadio Héroes de Curupayty, Asunción
Referee: (Argentina) Federico Cuesta

== See also ==
- 2015 South American Rugby Championship "A"
- 2014 South American Rugby Championship "A"
- South American Rugby Championship
