= Radu Petrescu =

Radu Petrescu may refer to:

- Radu Petrescu (referee, born 1982), Romanian football referee
- Radu Petrescu (referee, born 1980), Romanian rugby referee
