= Alejo Corral =

Uruguay international rugby union player

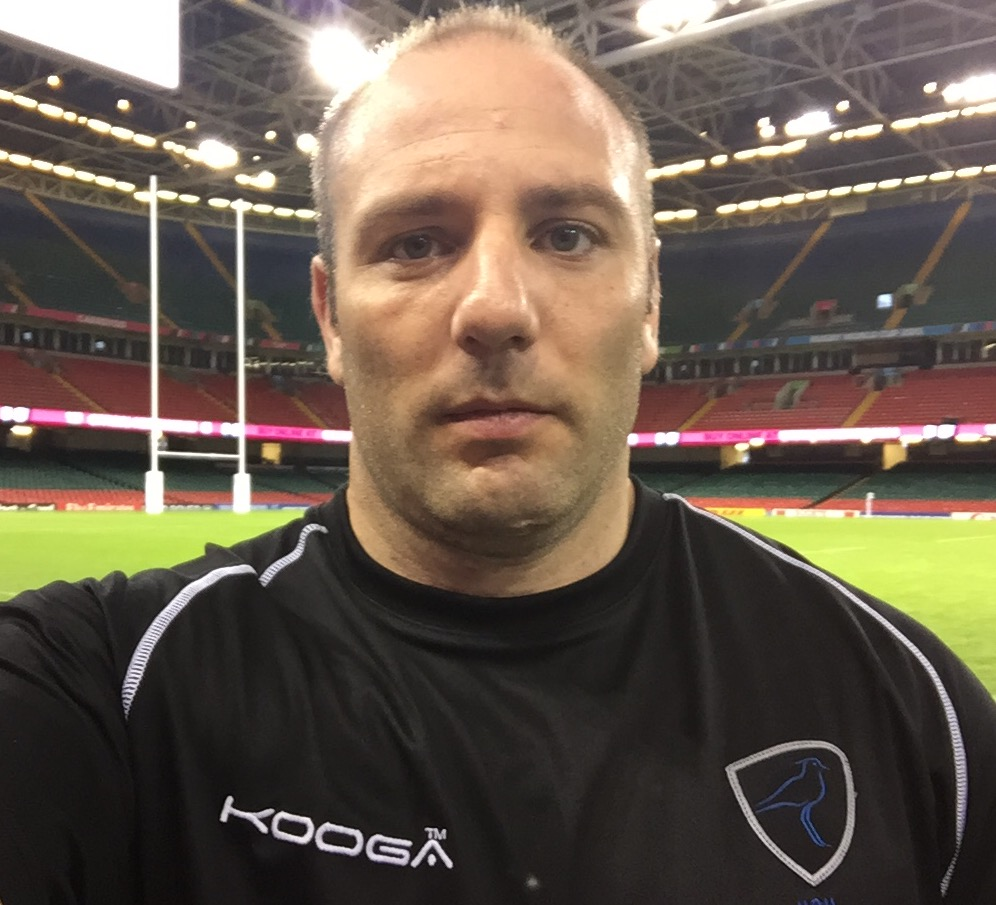
- Corral at the Millennium Stadium
- Born: September 11, 1981 (age 45) Buenos Aires, Argentina
- Height: 1.79 m (5 ft 10 1/2 in)
- Weight: 106 kg (16 st 10 lb)
- Notable relative: Matías Corral (Brother)

Rugby union career
- Position: Prop
- Current team: SIC
Amateur team(s)
Years	Team	Apps	(Points)
2016	OBC		
2007-2015	SIC		
2003-2005	SIC		
1999-2003	OBC		
- Correct as of 30 August 2015
Senior career
Years	Team	Apps	(Points)
2005-2007	Sannio	31	(30)
- Correct as of 30 August 2015
Provincial / State sides
Years	Team	Apps	(Points)
2010-Present	Charrúas XV	14	(15)
- Correct as of 30 August 2015
International career
Years	Team	Apps	(Points)
2005-2015	Uruguay	55	(15)
- Correct as of 10 October 2015

Alejo Corral (born September 11, 1981) is a rugby union player from Argentina who represents Uruguay at international level. He is the younger brother of Matías Corral, former player of the first XV of San Isidro Club between 1988 and 1995, and Puma from 1992 until his retirement after the 1995 Rugby World Cup and Estanislao Corral, also former player of San Isidro Club, and member of the squad that drew against Australia in 1987. The three brothers are left props.

== Sporting career ==
Alejo started playing rugby in 1987 in San Isidro Club in infant stage. In 1995, still in primary school, while his brother Matías was playing the Rugby World Cup, his family moved to Punta del Este, Uruguay, where he continued playing rugby defending the colors of Los Lobos Marinos, partner founder of that club and being coached by Pablo Lemoine, former teammate and current coach in the national team. In 1999, he left the club in Punta del Este because it didn't have enough players to form a division according to his age at the moment, and that's why he was transferred to Old Boys in Montevideo, starting at the under-19 team, and debuted there in first division in 2000, with the endorsement of Pedro Bordaberry, coach of that team. In 2003 he returned to San Isidro Club, joining the under-22 team and debuted in first division in 2005, against Atlético del Rósario. Later in September 2005, he made a brief professional experience in the Unione Rugby Sannio, in Italy, returning to SIC in 2007, where it remains currently playing, being a valuable prop and achieving complete his university studies, interrupted by his adventure in Italy.

== Honours ==
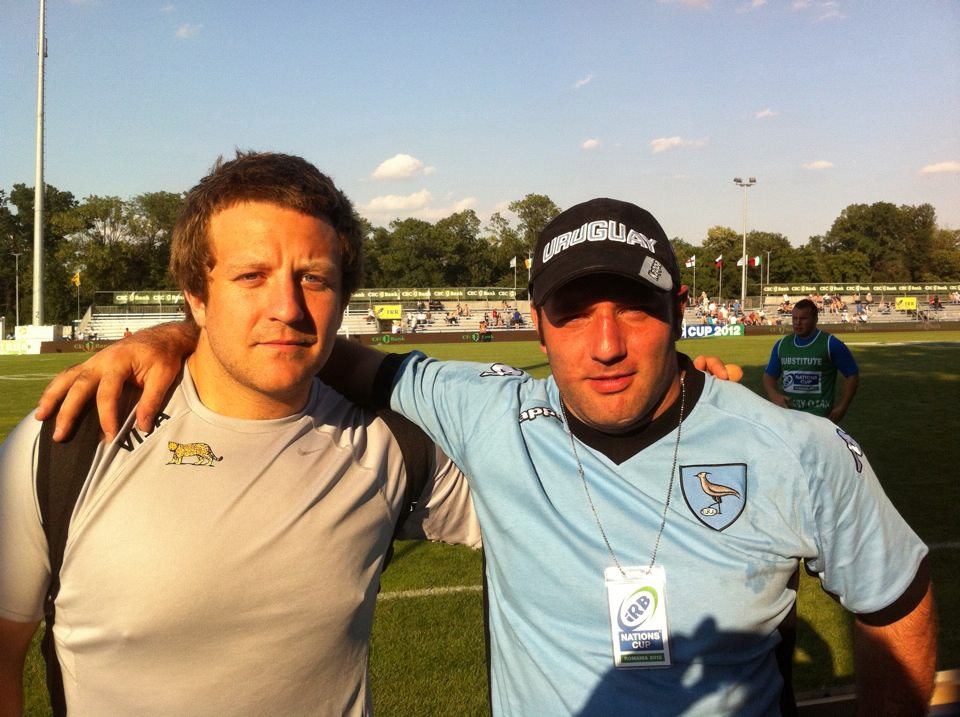
Piccinini and Corral, in the IRB Nations Cup, at the Stadionul Arcul de Triumf

=== Local titles ===
Title	Club	Country	Year
Charlie Cat Tournament	Old Boys	Uruguay	2002
Quesada Cup	San Isidro Club	Argentina	2004
Nacional de Clubes	San Isidro Club	Argentina	2008
Toyota Cup	San Isidro Club	Argentina	2009
URBA Top-14	San Isidro Club	Argentina	2010
URBA Top-14	San Isidro Club	Argentina	2011
Corrientes Cup	San Isidro Club	Argentina	2013

== National team ==
With Los Teros was able to debut internationally, integrating the Uruguay National Team Under-21, in the South American Tournament in Paraguay 2001. In the Senior Team, his first Test-Match was in 2005, against Portugal, in Estoril, for the Intercontinental Cup. In 2009 returns, after three years of absence, for the process and preparation for the first stage of classification to RWC 2011, which culminated in the series against the United States in November 2009. In 2010, the new head coach Gonzalo Camardón quoted him again to play the Cross Border Tournament, the South American Championship, the Churchill Cup and the second stage of qualifying for the RWC 2011 compared to Kazakhstan and Romania respectively. In 2011, with Lemoine as head coach, he was summoned for the South American Championship that was held in Iguazú, Misiones and the European tour for the November international window of the IRB, which ended up being very positive, after facing Portugal and Spain, ending the year ranked as the best team out of World Cup.

== Tournaments with National Team ==
Los Teritos

- South American Rugby Tournament U-21: 2001 & 2002.

Los Teros

- RWC 2015
- Uru Cup: 2015
- IRB Tbilisi Cup: 2013 & 2015
- IRB Americas Cup: 2012
- IRB Nations Cup: 2012 & 2014
- Argentine Championship 2012
- IRB Window: 2011, 2013, 2014 & 2015
- South American Rugby Tournament: 2010, 2011, 2012, 2013, 2014 & 2015
- RWC Qualy: 2009, 2010, 2013 & 2014
- Churchill Cup: 2010
- Cross Border: 2009, 2010, 2011
- Intercontinental Cup: 2005

=== Cups details ===
Rugby Cups
	Rival	Score	Date	City/Country	Instance	Stadium	Coach
1	Portugal	6-20	12/11/05	Estoril, Portugal	IRB Window	Estádio António Coimbra da Mota	(Uruguay) Sebastian Piñeyrúa
2	United States	22-27	14/11/09	Montevideo, Uruguay	QRWC 2011	Charrúa Stadium	(Uruguay) Felipe Puig
3	United States	6-27	21/11/09	Florida, United States	QRWC 2011	Fort Lauderdale Stadium	(Uruguay) Felipe Puig
4	Brazil	26-10	13/05/10	Santiago, Chile	South American Championship	CARR of the Queen	(Argentina) Gonzalo Camardón
5	Paraguay	47-14	16/05/10	Santiago, Chile	South American Championship	CARR of the Queen	(Argentina) Gonzalo Camardón
6	Chile	36-19	19/05/10	Santiago, Chile	South American Championship	CARR of the Queen	(Argentina) Gonzalo Camardón
7	Argentina	0-38	21/05/10	Santiago, Chile	South American Championship	CARR of the Queen	(Argentina) Gonzalo Camardón
8	Canada	6-48	05/06/10	Denver, United States	Churchill Cup	Infinity Park Stadium	(Argentina) Gonzalo Camardón
9	France	10-43	09/06/10	Denver, United States	Churchill Cup	Infinity Park Stadium	(Argentina) Gonzalo Camardón
10	Russia	19-38	19/06/10	New York, United States	Churchill Cup	Red Bull Arena	(Argentina) Gonzalo Camardón
11	Kazakhstan	44-7	17/07/10	Montevideo, Uruguay	QRWC 2011	Charrúa Stadium	(Argentina) Gonzalo Camardón
12	Romania	21-21	13/11/10	Montevideo, Uruguay	QRWC 2011	Charrúa Stadium	(Argentina) Gonzalo Camardón
13	Romania	12-39	27/11/10	Bucharest, Romania	QRWC 2011	Stadionul Arcul de Triumf	(Argentina) Gonzalo Camardón
14	Paraguay	102-6	14/05/11	Iguazu, Argentina	South American Championship	Cataratas Rugby Club	(Uruguay) Pablo Lemoine
15	Brazil	39-18	17/05/11	Iguazu, Argentina	South American Championship	Cataratas Rugby Club	(Uruguay) Pablo Lemoine
16	Chile	18-21	20/05/11	Iguazu, Argentina	South American Championship	Cataratas Rugby Club	(Uruguay) Pablo Lemoine
17	Portugal	16-9	13/11/11	Caldas da Rainha, Portugal	IRB Window	Municipal Stadium	(Uruguay) Pablo Lemoine
18	Spain	13-16	19/11/11	Madrid, Spain	IRB Window	Complutense Rugby Stadium	(Uruguay) Pablo Lemoine
19	Chile	27-26	23/05/12	Santiago, Chile	South American Championship	CARR of the Queen	(Uruguay) Pablo Lemoine
20	Romania	9-29	08/06/12	Bucharest, Romania	IRB Nations Cup	Stadionul Arcul de Triumf	(Uruguay) Pablo Lemoine
21	Russia	13-19	12/06/12	Bucharest, Romania	IRB Nations Cup	Stadionul Arcul de Triumf	(Uruguay) Pablo Lemoine
22	Portugal	35-7	17/06/12	Bucharest, Romania	IRB Nations Cup	Stadionul Arcul de Triumf	(Uruguay) Pablo Lemoine
23	Canada	10-28	12/10/12	Victoria, Canada	IRB Americas Cup	Westhills Arena	(Uruguay) Pablo Lemoine
24	Argentina	10-21	16/10/12	Victoria, Canada	IRB Americas Cup	Westhills Arena	(Uruguay) Pablo Lemoine
25	United States	26-8	20/10/12	Victoria, Canada	IRB Americas Cup	Westhills Arena	(Uruguay) Pablo Lemoine
26	Portugal	27-32	11/11/12	Montevideo, Uruguay	IRB Window	Carrasco Polo Club	(Uruguay) Pablo Lemoine
27	Argentina	18-29	27/04/13	Montevideo, Uruguay	South American Championship	Charrúa Stadium	(Uruguay) Pablo Lemoine
28	Brazil	58-7	01/05/13	Montevideo, Uruguay	SA-QRWC 2015	Charrúa Stadium	(Uruguay) Pablo Lemoine
29	Chile	23-9	04/05/13	Montevideo, Uruguay	SA-QRWC 2015	Charrúa Stadium	(Uruguay) Pablo Lemoine
-	England	21-41	02/06/13	Montevideo, Uruguay	South American XV	Charrúa Stadium	(Uruguay) Pablo Lemoine
30	South Africa	9-37	07/06/13	Tbilisi, Georgia	Tbilisi Cup	Avchala Stadium	(Uruguay) Pablo Lemoine
31	(Georgia (country)) Georgia	3-27	11/06/13	Tbilisi, Georgia	Tbilisi Cup	Avchala Stadium	(Uruguay) Pablo Lemoine
32	(Republic of Ireland) Ireland	33-42	16/06/13	Tbilisi, Georgia	Tbilisi Cup	Avchala Stadium	(Uruguay) Pablo Lemoine
33	Spain	16-15	16/11/13	Montevideo, Uruguay	IRB Window	Charrúa Stadium	(Uruguay) Pablo Lemoine
34	United States	27-27	22/03/14	Montevideo, Uruguay	QRWC 2015	Charrúa Stadium	(Uruguay) Pablo Lemoine
35	United States	13-32	29/03/14	Atlanta, United States	QRWC 2015	Fifth Third Bank Stadium	(Uruguay) Pablo Lemoine
36	Chile	55-13	10/05/14	Montevideo, Uruguay	South American Championship	Charrúa Stadium	(Uruguay) Pablo Lemoine
37	Romania	16-34	13/06/14	Bucharest, Romania	IRB Nations Cup	Stadionul Arcul de Triumf	(Uruguay) Pablo Lemoine
38	Russia	13-6	22/06/14	Bucharest, Romania	IRB Nations Cup	Stadionul Arcul de Triumf	(Uruguay) Pablo Lemoine
39	Hong Kong	28-3	02/08/14	Montevideo, Uruguay	QRWC 2015	Charrúa Stadium	(Uruguay) Pablo Lemoine
40	Russia	21-22	27/09/14	Siberia, Russia	QRWC 2015	Central Stadium	(Uruguay) Pablo Lemoine
41	Russia	36-27	11/10/14	Montevideo, Uruguay	QRWC 2015	Charrúa Stadium	(Uruguay) Pablo Lemoine
42	Brazil	48-9	18/04/15	Montevideo, Uruguay	South American Championship	Charrúa Stadium	(Uruguay) Pablo Lemoine
43	United States	3-13	23/04/15	Montevideo, Uruguay	World Rugby Window	Old Christians Club	(Uruguay) Pablo Lemoine
44	Chile	15-30	09/05/15	Santiago, Chile	South American Championship	CARR of the Queen	(Uruguay) Pablo Lemoine
45	Fiji	22-30	23/05/15	Montevideo, Uruguay	World Rugby Window	Charrúa Stadium	(Uruguay) Pablo Lemoine
46	Fiji	22-42	31/05/15	Montevideo, Uruguay	World Rugby Window	Charrúa Stadium	(Uruguay) Pablo Lemoine
47	(Georgia (country)) Georgia	10-19	13/06/15	Tbilisi, Georgia	Tbilisi Cup	Avchala Stadium	(Uruguay) Pablo Lemoine
48	(Republic of Ireland) Ireland	7-33	17/06/15	Tbilisi, Georgia	Tbilisi Cup	Avchala Stadium	(Uruguay) Pablo Lemoine
49	Italy	13-23	21/06/15	Tbilisi, Georgia	Tbilisi Cup	Avchala Stadium	(Uruguay) Pablo Lemoine
50	Argentina	30-26	01/08/15	Montevideo, Uruguay	World Rugby Window	Charrúa Stadium	(Uruguay) Pablo Lemoine
51	Japan	8-30	22/08/15	Fukuoka, Japan	World Rugby Window	Level-5 Stadium	(Uruguay) Pablo Lemoine
52	Japan	0-40	29/08/15	Tokyo, Japan	World Rugby Window	Chichibunomiya Rugby Stadium	(Uruguay) Pablo Lemoine
53	Wales	9-54	20/09/15	Cardiff, Wales	RWC 2015	Millennium Stadium	(Uruguay) Pablo Lemoine
54	Fiji	15-47	06/10/15	Milton Keynes, England	RWC 2015	MK Stadium	(Uruguay) Pablo Lemoine
55	England	3-60	10/10/15	Manchester, England	RWC 2015	Manchester City Stadium	(Uruguay) Pablo Lemoine

== See also ==
- Los Teros
- San Isidro Club
- Matías Corral
- Old Boys Club
- Unione Rugby Sannio
