= 2012 South American Rugby Championship "B" =

13° Campeonato Sudamericano de Rugby B
- Date: 21–26 August 2012
- Countries: Colombia; Paraguay; Peru; Venezuela

Final positions
- Champions: Paraguay
- Runner-up: Peru

Tournament statistics
- Matches played: 6

The Confederación Sudamericana de Rugby (CONSUR) B Division Championship in Valencia, Venezuela was played out during September 2012. The championship doubled as a 2015 Rugby World Cup qualifier, with the winner to play against the 2012 NACRA Caribbean champions, Bermuda, for the right to playoff against Brazil. The winner of this final match would be promoted to the 2013 CONSUR Division "A" Championship.

Paraguay were crowned champions, after going through their three matches undefeated, against Venezuela, Colombia and Peru.

== 2012 CONSUR B Championship ==
Progress to 2015 RWC - Americas qualification Round 1 final

| Place | Nation | Games | | | | Points | | | Table points |
| Place | Nation | Played | Won | Drawn | Lost | For | Against | Diff | Table points |
|---|---|---|---|---|---|---|---|---|---|
| 1 | Paraguay (40) | 3 | 3 | 0 | 0 | 196 | 28 | +168 | 9 |
| 2 | Colombia (74) | 3 | 2 | 0 | 1 | 92 | 66 | +26 | 6 |
| 3 | Venezuela (53) | 3 | 1 | 0 | 2 | 39 | 116 | -77 | 3 |
| 4 | Peru (63) | 3 | 0 | 0 | 3 | 29 | 146 | -117 | 0 |

Number in brackets indicates the pre-tournament IRB ranking of team.

Match schedule

| 9 September 2012 | Paraguay | 54 – 17 | Colombia | Estadio Arístides Pineda, Valencia, Venezuela |
| 14:00 | Try: José Lezcano 2 (10', 30'), Rodrigo Llamosas (15'), Carlos Bareiro (29'), Vicente Amigo (40'), Diego Argaña (54'), Gerard Cuttier (59'), Manuel Careaga (62'); Con: Vicente Amigo (4), Gerard Cuttier (2), Manuel Careaga | Report, IRB Team List | Try: Carlos Lopes (41'), Gerson Ortiz (72'), Oscar Forero Fandino (76'); Con: Jose Manuel Diosa; Cards: 1 yellow | Referee: (Brazil) Ricardo Sant'Anna |

| 9 September 2012 | Venezuela | 28 – 17 | Peru | Estadio Arístides Pineda, Valencia, Venezuela |
| 16:00 | Try: Carlos Barboza 2 (5', 25'), Gererdo Mohamada (35'), Daniel Jaramillo (64'), Sergio Pulido (72'); Drop: Pablo Barboza (79') | Report, IRB Team List | Try: Luis Tejeda (51'); Pen: Gustavo Martinez 4 (2', 11', 30', 56') | Referee: (Paraguay) Martín Lugo |

| 12 September 2012 | Venezuela | 3 – 26 | Colombia | Estadio Arístides Pineda, Valencia, Venezuela |
| 14:00 | Pen: Sergio Pulido (38') | IRB Team List | Try: Juan Pamplona (32'), Jose Manuel Diosa (68'); Con: Jose Manuel Diosa 2 Pen: Jose Manuel Diosa 2 (16', 36'); Drop: Emmanuel Bedoya 2 (59', 73') | Referee: (Argentina) Matías Fresia |

| 12 September 2012 | Paraguay | 69 – 3 | Peru | Estadio Arístides Pineda, Valencia, Venezuela |
| 16:00 | Try: José Lezcano 3 (8', 52', 79'), Rodrigo Llamosas (21'), Gonzalo Bareiro (29'), Hugo Chavez 2 (31', 65'), Andres Nasser (37'), Felix Zarate (61'), Martin Ortiz (69'), Gerard Cuttier (75'); Con: Gerard Cuttier 7 | IRB Team List | Pen: Gustavo Martinez (4') | Referee: (Brazil) Ricardo Sant'Anna |

| 15 September 2012 | Colombia | 49 – 9 | Peru | Estadio Arístides Pineda, Valencia, Venezuela |
| 14:00 | Try: Johan Larrota (4'), Pablo Lemoine (8'), Jesus Celis (30'), Sebastian Mejia 2 (52', 55'), Bryan Campino Riascos (70'); Con: José Manuel Goddess 5 Pen: José Manuel Goddess 3 (48', 66', 77') | Match Report; IRB Team List | Pen: Gustavo Martinez 3 (23', 38', 34') | Referee: (Chile) Jean Paul Casanova |

| 15 September 2012 | Venezuela | 8 – 73 | Paraguay | Estadio Arístides Pineda, Valencia, Venezuela |
| | Try: Rodrigo Salas (62'); Pen: Sergio Pelido (6') | Match Report; IRB Team List | Try: Penalty try (1'), Felix Zarate 2 (15', 58'), Carlos Bareiro 2 (18', 77'), Diego Argaña (44'), Rodrigo Llamosas 2 (48', 70'), Gerard Cuttier (50'), Martin Ortiz 2 (54', 70'); Con: Vicente Amigo 9 | Referee: (Argentina) Matías Fresia |

== See also ==
- 2012 South American Rugby Championship "A"
- 2012 South American Rugby Championship "C"
