= 2013 South American Rugby Championship "A" =

35° Campeonato Sudamericano de Rugby
Tournament details
- Host: Uruguay
- Date: 27 April– 4 May 2013
- Countries: Argentina; Brazil; Chile; Uruguay

Final positions
- Champions: Argentina
- Runner-up: Uruguay

Tournament statistics
- Matches played: 6

The 2013 South American Rugby Championship (Confederación Sudamericana de Rugby (CONSUR) Championship) Division A doubled as a 2015 Rugby World Cup qualifier. The matches were held in Montevideo, Uruguay and Temuco, Chile between 27 April and 4 May 2013.

Argentina already qualified for the 2015 Rugby World Cup, after being quarter-finalists at the 2011 Rugby World Cup. The highest place team after Argentina would progress to a playoff with the losing team in the North America playoff, either Canada or the US.

Argentina, Uruguay and Chile qualified for this tournament, after finishing in the top three of the 2012 edition. The fourth spot went to Brazil, decided by a playoff between the 4th placed team at the 2012 South American Rugby Championship "A" (Brazil) and the 2012 South American Rugby Championship "B" champions (Paraguay).

== Standings ==
Place	Nation	Games				Points			Table points
Place	Nation	Played	Won	Drawn	Lost	For	Against	Diff	Table points
1	Argentina (8)	3	3	0	0	197	28	+169	9
2	Uruguay (21)	3	2	0	1	99	45	+54	6
3	Chile (25)	3	1	0	2	57	130	–73	3
4	Brazil (33)	3	0	0	3	29	179	–150	0

Pre-tournament rankings are in parentheses.

== Matches ==
=== Round 1 ===
27 April 2013

Uruguay	18–29	Argentina
Try: 2 Con: 1 Pen: 2	Report	Try: 4 Con: 3 Pen: 1

Estadio Charrua
Montevideo, Uruguay
Referee: Felipe Balbontín Chile

27 April 2013

Chile	38–22	Brazil
Try: 4 Con: 3 Pen: 4	Report	Try: 3 Con: 2 Pen: 1

Estadio German Becker
Temuco, Chile
Referee: Claudio Antonio Argentina

=== Round 2 ===
1 May 2013

Argentina	85–10	Chile
Try: 13; Con: 10	Report	Try: 2

Estadio Charrua
Montevideo, Uruguay
Referee: Joaquín Montes Uruguay

1 May 2013

Uruguay	58–7	Brazil
Try: 8 Con: 6 Pen: 2	Report	Try: 1 Con: 1

Estadio Charrua
Montevideo, Uruguay
Referee: Juan Silvestre Argentina

=== Round 3 ===
4 May 2013

Argentina	83–0	Brazil
Try: 13; Con: 9	Report

Estadio Charrúa
Montevideo, Uruguay
Referee: Joaquín Montes Uruguay

4 May 2013

Uruguay	23–9	Chile
Try: 2 Con: 2 Pen: 3	Report	Pen: 3

Estadio Charrúa
Montevideo, Uruguay
Referee: Francisco Pastrana Argentina

== See also ==
- 2013 South American Rugby Championship "B"
- 2013 South American Rugby Championship "C"
