= Matías Corral =

Argentina international rugby union player (born 1968)

- Born: Matías Corral; August 10, 1968 (age 58) Buenos Aires, Argentina
- Height: 1.81 m (5 ft 11 1/2 in)
- Weight: 95 kg (14 st 13 lb)
- Notable relative: Alejo Corral (Brother)
- Occupation: Country Manager of ZARA

Rugby union career
- Position: Prop
Senior career
Years	Team	Apps	(Points)
1988-1995	SIC		
Provincial / State sides
Years	Team	Apps	(Points)
1992-1995	URBA	31	(10)
- Correct as of September 12, 1995
International career
Years	Team	Apps	(Points)
1992-1995	Argentina	17	(5)
- Correct as of September 12, 1995

Matías Corral (born August 10, 1968) is a former Argentine rugby union player. He played as a prop.

He played in First Division for the San Isidro Club (SIC ) between 1988 and 1995. World champion with Los Pumitas under-19, in the World Cup 1987 and Puma from 1992 until his retirement after the 1995 Rugby World Cup, held in South Africa where he was honored as the best left prop of the world Cup that year, the only Argentine joined the Dream Team. Also, along with Patricio Noriega and Federico Mendez, they were named as the best first line of the world. He is the older brother of Alejo Corral, current player of SIC and Los Teros.

== Sport career ==
Matías always played at the San Isidro Club, debuted in first division in 1988, forming one of the most memorable first lines, with Juan José Angelillo and Diego Cash. He joined the under-19 and 21 province selection of Buenos Aires and Los Pumitas. In 1992 he joined the university selection in the World Cup played in Rome where he finished in the second place. Also in the same year, he represented the Senior Selection of Buenos Aires. In 1993, plays his first Test-Match with Los Pumas, in the victory against Japan. Of the 17 test matches played, he won 8 and lost 9. Also, in 1993, with Buenos Aires Selection, he was part of the team who beat the Springboks 28–27, being one of the most valuable players of the match, which earned him a nomination for the Olimpia Award that year. In 1994 the prestigious Argentine journal Clarín, honored him as the best rugby player in Argentina. In 1995, he played his only World Cup, where Argentina showed a high level, despite all the previous problems, losing against England for 24–18, match in which the English could not score any tries. Then, came the losses against Samoa and Italy, where Corral score his only try in his short international career. Corral was recognized as the best left prop of the World Cup. Then, after the Rugby World Cup, and rejecting offers to play in several of the best clubs of Europe and Oceania, he decided to study a master in marketing in Boston University, USA.

== Honours ==
=== Local Titles ===
Title	Club	Country	Year
URBA	San Isidro Club	Argentina	1993
Nacional de Clubes	San Isidro Club	Argentina	1993
URBA	San Isidro Club	Argentina	1994
Nacional de Clubes	San Isidro Club	Argentina	1994

=== Provincial Titles ===
Title	Union	Country	Year
Argentine Championship	Buenos Aires	Argentina	1994
Punta del Este Sevens	Buenos Aires	Argentina	1994

=== International Titles ===
Title	Union	Country	Year
Pan-American Championship	Los Pumas	Argentina	1995
South American Championship	Los Pumas	Argentina	1993
World Cup U-19	Los Pumitas	Argentina	1987

=== Cups Details ===
Rugby Cups
	Rival	Score	Date	City/Country	Instance	Coach	Tries
1	Japan	45-20	22/05/93	Buenos Aires, Argentina	IRB Window	(Argentina) José Javier Fernández	
2	Brazil	114-3	02/10/93	São Paulo, Brazil	South American Championship	(Argentina) José Javier Fernández	
3	Paraguay	51-3	16/10/93	Buenos Aires, Argentina	South American Championship	(Argentina) José Javier Fernández	
4	Uruguay	19-10	23/10/93	Montevideo, Uruguay	South American Championship	(Argentina) José Javier Fernández	
5	South Africa	26-29	06/11/93	Buenos Aires, Argentina	IRB Window	(Argentina) José Javier Fernández	
6	South Africa	23-52	13/11/93	Buenos Aires, Argentina	IRB Window	(Argentina) José Javier Fernández	
7	United States	28-22	28/05/94	California, United States	IRB Window	(Argentina) José Javier Fernández	
8	Scotland	16-15	04/06/94	Buenos Aires, Argentina	IRB Window	(Argentina) José Javier Fernández	
9	South Africa	22-42	08/10/94	Port Elizabeth, South Africa	IRB Window	(Argentina) José Javier Fernández	
10	South Africa	26-46	15/10/94	Johannesburg, South Africa	IRB Window	(Argentina) José Javier Fernández	
11	Uruguay	44-3	04/03/95	Buenos Aires, Argentina	Pan-American Championship	(Argentina) Ricardo Paganini	
12	Canada	29-26	11/03/95	Buenos Aires, Argentina	Pan-American Championship	(Argentina) Ricardo Paganini	
13	Australia	7-53	30/04/95	Brisbane, Australia	IRB Window	(Argentina) Ricardo Paganini	
14	Australia	13-30	06/05/95	Sydney, Australia	IRB Window	(Argentina) Ricardo Paganini	
15	England	18-24	27/05/95	Durban, South Africa	RWC 1995	(Argentina) Ricardo Paganini	
16	Samoa	26-32	30/05/95	East London, South Africa	RWC 1995	(Argentina) Ricardo Paganini	
17	Italy	25-31	04/06/95	East London, South Africa	RWC 1995	(Argentina) Ricardo Paganini	1 Try

== Present ==
Corral, who always defined himself as "an athlete before a rugby player" makes his words do not die in the attempt. At the moment, when his has some free time as Country Manager of ZARA, he dedicate and prepares for marathons, but not just any marathon, he runs the Ironman, one of the hardest disciplines, consisting of three stages: 3,8 km swimming, 180 km in bicycle and 42 km running until the end line. Matías has completed three Ironmans: Florida and the Rio de Janeiro in 2009 and China in 2010, where he recorded 1h.15m.52s., swimming, 5h.55m.11s, cycling and 4h.56m.01s., running, totaling a 12h.19m.28s time of pure activity without breaks or intervals. His training allowed him to get back together with several of his old friends from the national team by being part of the Pumas Classics Team in the World Cup in Bermuda in 2010.

== See also ==
- Pumas
- San Isidro Club
- Alejo Corral
