= Unione Rugby Sannio =

(Italy) Rugby Sannio
- Full name: Unione Rugby Sannio
- Union: Federazione Italiana Rugby
- Founded: August 27, 1998
- Location: San Giorgio del Sannio, Benevento, Italy
- Ground(s): Pacevecchia
- President: Antonio Follo
- Coach(es): Fernando Fossi
- League(s): FIR
- 2011-2012: 7th (Serie B)
1st kit	2nd kit

Official website
- www.rugbysannio.it

Unione Rugby Sannio (founded on August 27, 1998) is a sport society dedicated to rugby union, located in San Giorgio del Sannio, Benevento, Italy, member of the FIR

== The Beginning ==
The company was founded in 1998 to give life to a project rugby "high quality" in the initiative of a group of 20 founding members of the three associations involved in rugby decades of Sannio, in close consultation with the oldest rugby tradition of Campania.

Makers are involved in the project from the beginning, hiring several of the best coaches in the FIR, dozens of athletes entered by the owners, in the circuit of national youth teams are mixed by an executive team that, besides the figure of the passion, constantly refers to the method of management.

== Hall of Fame ==
- Updated on March 6, 2011.

Year	President	Championship	Captain	Coach
1998–1999	(Italy) Michele Manzo	Under-20	(Italy) Fabio Tirelli	(Italy) Lorenzo De Vanna
1999–2000	(Italy) Michele Manzo	Under-20	(Italy) Antonio Mannato	(Italy) Lorenzo De Vanna
2000–2001	(Italy) Francarlo Iandolo	Under-20	(Italy) Antonio Mannato	(Italy) Lorenzo De Vanna
2001–2002	(Italy) Francarlo Iandolo	Under-20	(Italy) Antonio Mannato	(Italy) Lorenzo De Vanna
2002–2003	(Italy) Francarlo Iandolo	Series B	(Italy) Antonio Manzo	(Italy) Lorenzo De Vanna
2003–2004	(Italy) Antonio Follo	Series B	(Italy) Fabio Tirelli	(Italy) Lorenzo De Vanna
2004–2005	(Italy) Antonio Follo	Series A	(Italy) Fabio Tirelli	(Italy) Franco Cioffi
2005–2006	(Italy) Antonio Follo	Series A	(Italy) Andrea Porrazzo	(Italy) Franco Cioffi
2006–2007	(Italy) Antonio Follo	Series A	(Italy) Claudio Gaudiello	(Italy) Franco Cioffi
2007–2008	(Italy) Antonio Follo	Series B	(Italy) Fabio Tirelli	(Italy) Fernando Fossi
2008–2009	(Italy) Antonio Follo	Series B	(Italy) Fabio Tirelli	(Italy) Fernando Fossi
2009–2010	(Italy) Antonio Follo	Series B	(Italy) Fabio Tirelli	(Italy) Fernando Fossi
2010–2011	(Italy) Antonio Follo	Series B	(Italy) Fabio Tirelli	(Italy) Fernando Fossi

== Notable all time players ==
- Fabio Tirelli
- Claudio Gaudiello
- Andrea Porrazzo
- Roberto Napoli
- Juan Francesio
- Alejandro Krancz
- Alejo Corral
- Alfredo Giuria

== Links & References ==
http://www.ilquaderno.it/unione-rugby-sannio-fernando-fossi-confermato-guida-prima-squadra-26526.html

http://www.ilsannita.it/20110504-60352-under-18-elite-la-forturon-unione-rugby-sannio-alle-fasi-finali-nazionali/
