= Radu Petrescu (referee, born 1980) =

Romanian rugby referee

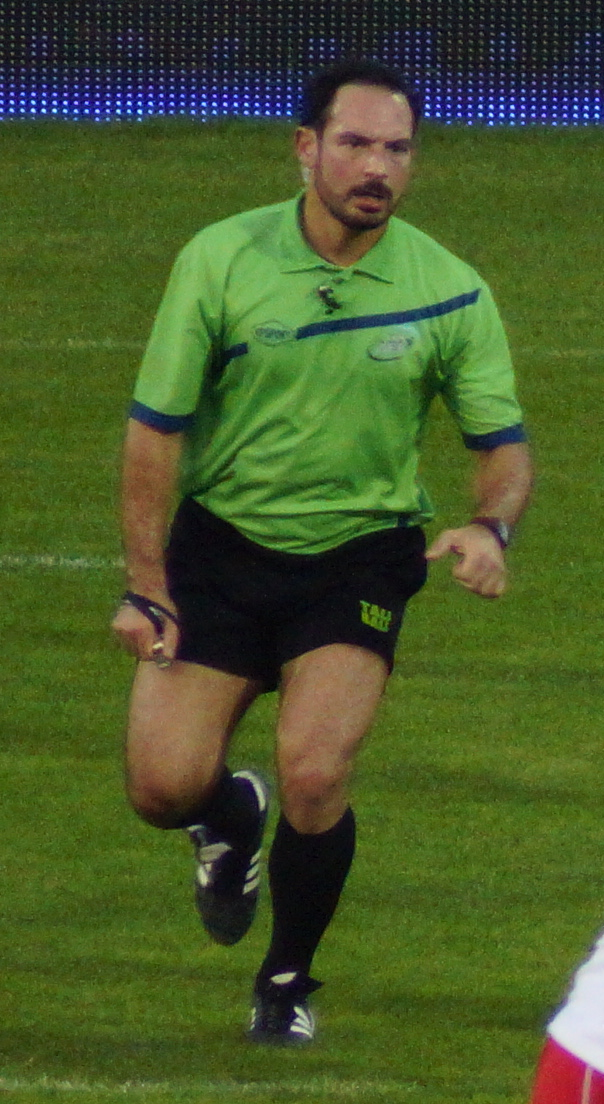
- Radu Petrescu officiating in 2014
- Born: Radu Petrescu; 19 April 1980 (age 46) Bucharest, SR Romania
- University: Faculty of Sociology and Social Work
- Occupation: Human resources manager

Rugby union career
- Position: Wing
Youth career
- 1990–?: Grivița București
- ?–?: Steaua București
Refereeing career
| Years | Competition | Apps |
| - | SuperLiga | |
| 2011 | 2011 IRB Junior World Rugby Trophy | |
| 2016 | European Nations Cup First Division | |

Radu Petrescu (born 19 April 1980) is a Romanian rugby referee who mainly referees club rugby in such tournaments as the Romanian SuperLiga.

== Playing career ==
Petrescu started playing rugby in 1990 with local team Grivița. At the end of his junior years he played for a short period of time for SuperLiga giants, Steaua. He ended his playing career just before moving to seniors, choosing to concentrate on his studies at the University of Bucharest.

== Referee career ==
Petrescu started his refereeing career in 2000 and is considered by many one of the most valuable referees in Romanian Rugby. Petrescu refereed 3 matches at the 2011 IRB Junior World Rugby Trophy in Georgia. Besides officiating in Romanian SuperLiga, Petrescu has been called to officiate in other European and International competitions such as: IRB Nations Cup, European Professional Club Rugby, Rugby Europe International Championships.
