= Takura Tela =

- Born: 26 February 1991 (age 35) Harare, Zimbabwe
- Height: 5 ft 7 in (170 cm)
- Weight: 170 lb (77 kg; 12 st 2 lb)
- School: Prince Edward High School
- University: Life

Rugby union career
- Position: Scrum-half
Youth career
- -: Prince Edward School
Amateur team(s)
Years	Team	Apps	(Points)
–	Harare Sports Club		
2011-2013	Life University		
International career
Years	Team	Apps	(Points)
–	Zimbabwe U20		

Takura Abus Tela (born 26 February 1991) is a Rugby scrum-half from Harare, Zimbabwe who plays for the Life University Running Eagles. He has been playing at the Life University NAIA Division I level, since he joined the team in 2011. Life University plays primarily competes in TSAC Conference, where Tela takes the position of Scrum-half. He is a former Zimbabwe Under-20 and Harare Sports Club center player. He represented Zimbabwe in the Junior World Rugby Trophy in 2011. He now plays for Life University.

== High school ==
Tela played for Prince Edward School in Harare. A high school in Zimbabwe noted for its winning Rugby team, the Prince Edward School "Tigers".

== Professional ==
Tela has been playing rugby since high school and has received much attention as a center and half back in the Zimbabwean national league and international leagues. Tela played the position of center for Harare Sports Club Rugby Section. He played in the Zimbabwe National Rugby League Tournaments. This led to his selection in to the Young Sables, the Junior national league. As a part of the Young Sables, He represented Zimbabwe in the Junior World Rugby Trophy Tournament.

== College ==
Tela plays for one of the top ranked college rugby teams in the US Life University is ranked number 2 in the country for the 2011–2012 season.

2012–2013 Season: He has seen action in his second year. Life University won the spring 2012 Las Vegas Invitational, earning a berth at the June 2012 Collegiate Rugby Championship where they reached the semifinals. He also played at the CRC tournament, the highest profile college rugby tournament in the US. Life won the fall 2012 South Independent 7s tournament.

2011–2012 Season: He played for Life University in his first year. Although a first year student, he qualified to play for the Running Eagles in the national college sevens champions.

== Personal ==
He was born in Harare, Zimbabwe.
