= Zaza Navrozashvili =

- Born: 27 February 1992 (age 34) Tbilisi, Georgia
- Height: 1.85 m (6 ft 1 in)
- Weight: 122 kg (19 st 3 lb)

Rugby union career
- Position: Prop
Senior career
Years	Team	Apps	(Points)
2013-15	Union Bordeaux Begles	4	(0)
2015-17	Lyon	12	(0)
2017-19	SC Albi	31	(20)
2019-	Provence Rugby	26	(0)
- Correct as of 12/12/2019
International career
Years	Team	Apps	(Points)
2015–2016	Georgia national rugby union team	4	(0)
- Correct as of 28/06/2015

Zaza Navrozashvili (born February 27, 1992) is a Georgian Rugby Union player. His position is Prop and he currently plays for Provence Rugby in the Top 14.
