= Yoshikatsu Hikosaka =

Japanese rugby union player

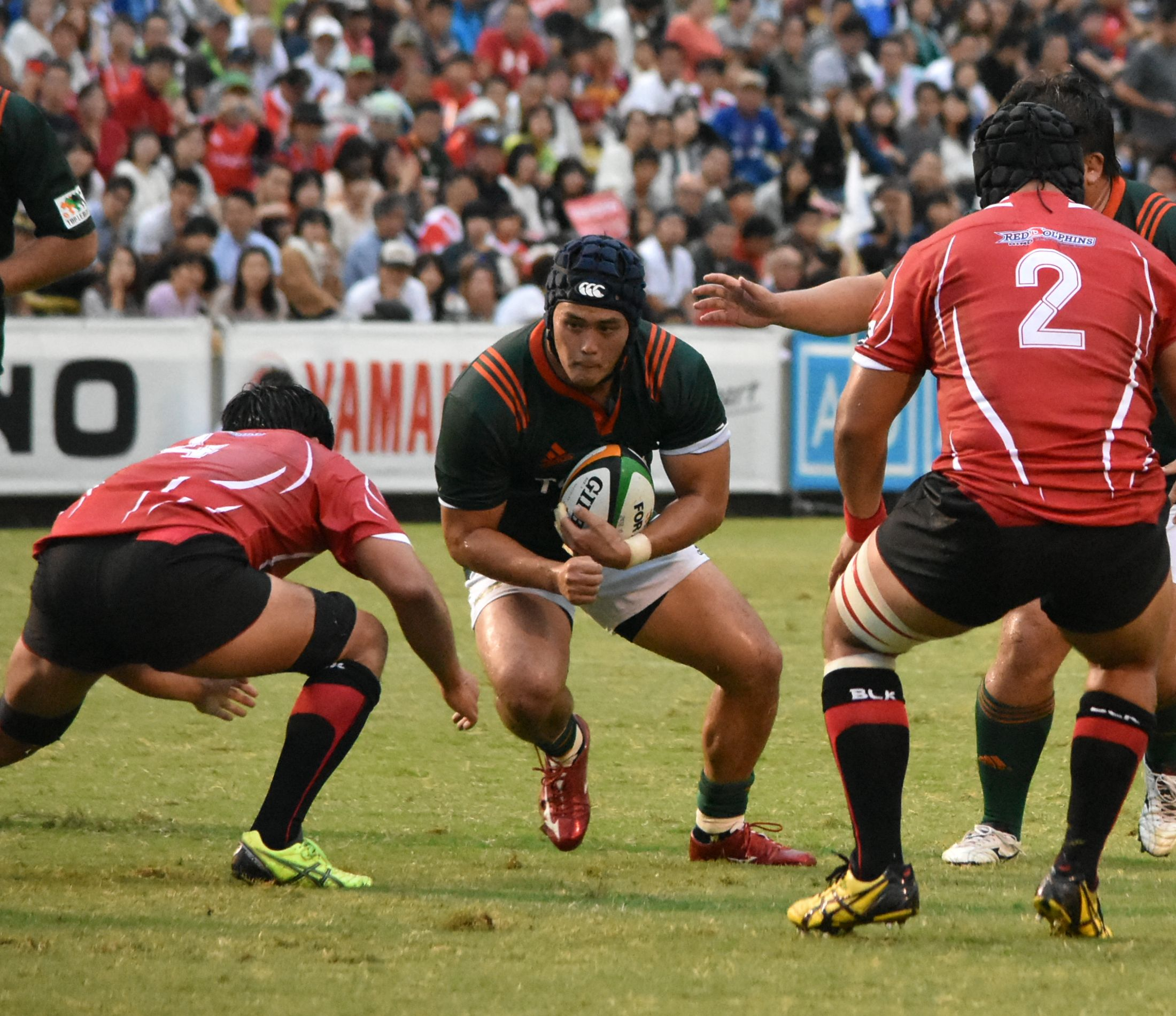
- Full name: Yoshikatsu Hikosaka
- Born: 18 January 1991 (age 35) Japan
- Height: 1.78 m (5 ft 10 in)
- Weight: 102 kg (16 st 1 lb; 225 lb)

Rugby union career
- Position: Hooker
- Current team: Toyota Verblitz
Senior career
Years	Team	Apps	(Points)
2013–present	Toyota Verblitz	150	(210)
- Correct as of 21 February 2021
International career
Years	Team	Apps	(Points)
2010–2011	Japan U20	4	(5)
2021	Japan	0	(0)
- Correct as of 21 February 2021

Hikosaka Yoshikatsu (彦坂 圭克, Yoshikatsu Hikosaka; born 18 Jan 1991) is a Japanese rugby union player who plays as a Hooker. He currently plays for Toyota Verblitz in Japan's domestic Top League.

== International ==
Hikosaka Yoshikatsu received his first call-up to his country, Japan head coach Jamie Joseph has named Hikosaka Yoshikatsu in a 52-man training squad ahead of British and Irish Lions test.
