= Bertrand Hourcade =

Swiss writer (1950–2021)

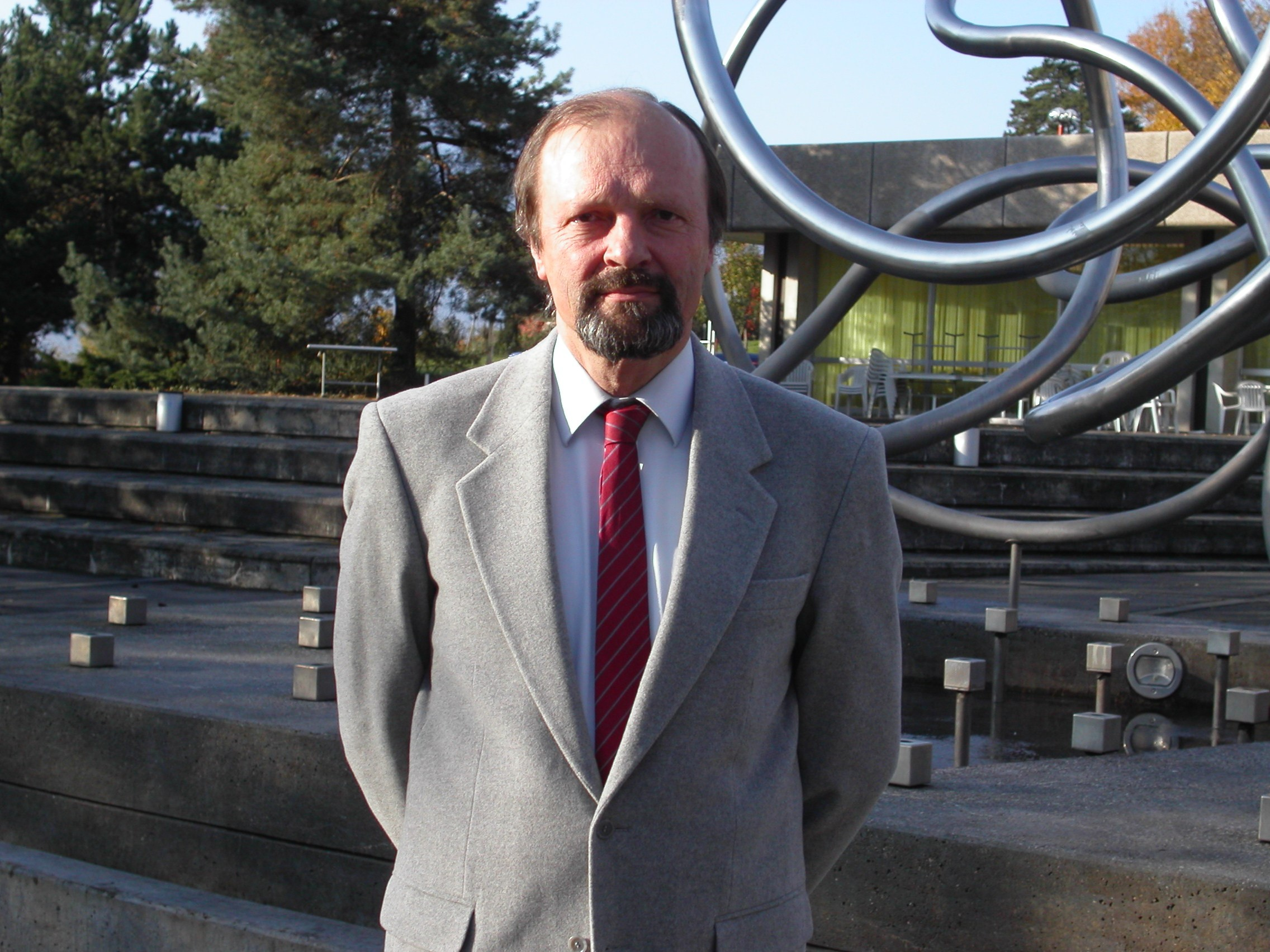
- Bertrand Hourcade 2004
- Born: 19 March 1950
- Died: 18 March 2021 (aged 70); Leysin, Switzerland
- Occupation: Writer

Bertrand Hourcade (19 March 1950 – 18 March 2021) was a Swiss writer and professor.

== Biography ==
Hourcade wrote his doctoral thesis on La Comédie humaine. His first book, an autobiography published in 2001 by Éditions Les Iles futures, was titled Le village magique. In 2004, he wrote Les roses du château, a collection of stories on the surrounding area of Lake Geneva. In 2006, he published a five-act play, titled Le don du pardon.

Bertrand Hourcade died in Leysin on 18 March 2021, one day shy of his 71st birthday.
