= Jerónimo Etcheverry =

Uruguay international rugby union player

- Born: Juan Jeronimo Etcheverry Cavanna; January 11, 1988 (age 38) Montevideo, Uruguay
- Height: 5 ft 10 in (1.78 m)
- Weight: 182 lb (83 kg)

Rugby union career
- Position(s): Fly-half, Fullback
Amateur team(s)
Years	Team	Apps	(Points)
2008-2010	Carrasco Polo Club		
2014-	Carrasco Polo Club		
Senior career
Years	Team	Apps	(Points)
2011-2014	Valpolicella		
International career
Years	Team	Apps	(Points)
2008–2016	Uruguay	45	(213)
- Correct as of 27 January 2021

Jerónimo Etcheverry (born 11 January 1988, in Montevideo) is a Uruguayan rugby union player. He currently plays as a fly-half and as a fullback for Carrasco Polo Club.

Etcheverry started playing since young for Carrasco Polo Club in Uruguay.

In early 2011, he moved to Italy to play for Rugby Club Valpolicella. He remained three years in the club, till June 2014, when he returned to Uruguay to finish his University Studies on Economy.

== International career ==
Etcheverry made his debut with Teros on 8 November 2008 against United States. He is one of the most promising Uruguayan players of his generation. He has 43 caps for Uruguay, since 2008, with 204 points scored.

He played at the 2011 Rugby World Cup, where Uruguay would be eliminated in the repechage. He would play again in the "Teros" 2015 Rugby World Cup qualifyings, helping his National Team return to the Rugby World Cup after three editions.

== Honours ==
Uruguay U20

- World Rugby Under 20 Trophy: 2008
