= 2012 South American Rugby Championship "A" =

34° Campeonato Sudamericano de Rugby
Tournament details
- Host: Chile
- Date: 20–26 May 2012
- Countries: Argentina; Brazil; Chile; Uruguay

Final positions
- Champions: Argentina
- Runner-up: Chile

Tournament statistics
- Matches played: 6

The 2012 South American Rugby Championship "A" was the 34th edition of the competition of the leading national rugby union teams in South America.

The tournament was held in Santiago, Chile. The last place team in the tournament, Brazil, faced the winner of a playoff between the winners of the 2012 South American Rugby Championship "B" division and the 2012 NACRA Caribbean tournament for a place in the 2013 tournament (which would serve a role in qualification for the 2015 Rugby World Cup).

== Standings ==
Team	Played	Won	Drawn	Lost	For	Against	Difference	Pts
Argentina	3	3	0	0	210	11	+199	9
Uruguay	3	2	0	1	59	81	−22	6
Chile	3	1	0	2	51	92	-31	3
Brazil	3	0	0	3	21	157	−136	0

== Matches ==
20 May 2012

Chile	19–6	Brazil
Try: 1 Con: 1 Pen: 4		Pen: 2

20 May 2012

Argentina	40–5	Uruguay
Try: 6 Con: 5		Try: 1

23 May 2012

Chile	26–27	Uruguay
Try: 2 Con: 2 Pen: 4		Try: 2 Con: 1 Pen: 5

23 May 2012

Argentina	111–0	Brazil
Try: 17; Con: 13

26 May 2012

Brazil	15–27	Uruguay

26 May 2012

Argentina	59–6	Chile

== See also ==
- 2012 South American Rugby Championship "B"
- 2012 South American Rugby Championship "C"
