= Joaquín Montes =

- Born: Joaquín Montes; 23 June 1979 (age 47) Montevideo, Uruguay
- University: Universidad de la Empresa (UDE)
- Occupation: Licensed in Administration

Rugby union career
Refereeing career
Years	Competition	Apps
2013–	Test matches	
2010–2013	World Rugby Under 20 Trophy	
2014	World Rugby Under 20 Championship	

Joaquín Montes (born 23 June 1979 in Montevideo) is a professional rugby union referee who represents the Uruguayan Rugby Union (URU) at the international level in refereeing.

== Career ==
Montes takes charge of both Campeonato Uruguayo de Rugby and Nacional de Clubes matches regularly.

In 2011, he refereed the Final of the 2011 IRB Junior World Rugby Trophy between Samoa and Japan.

On 26 June 2012, the Uruguayan Rugby Union named him as an international rugby union referee. After his nomination, his first international tournament of relevance involved was the 3rd edition of the Americas Rugby Championship in October of the same, held in Canada.

In November 2013, he refereed his first test match between Spain and Japan.
