= Leandro Leivas =

Uruguayan rugby union player

- Born: 6 July 1988 (age 38)
- Height: 1.80 m (5 ft 10 3/4 in)
- Weight: 94 kg (14 st 11 lb; 207 lb)

Rugby union career
- Position: Wing
- Current team: Toronto Arrows
Senior career
Years	Team	Apps	(Points)
2019-present	Toronto Arrows	11	(25)
- Correct as of 3 March 2020
International career
Years	Team	Apps	(Points)
2008-present	Uruguay	74	(120)
- Correct as of 7 September 2019

Leandro Leivas (born 6 July 1988) is a Uruguayan rugby union player who plays for the Seattle Seawolves in Major League Rugby (MLR). He was named in Uruguay's squad for the 2015 Rugby World Cup.

Leivas learned to play rugby at Stella Maris College. At the time of the 2015 Rugby World Cup he was working as a blacksmith and farrier.

On 11 December 2018, he signed with professional Canadian club Toronto Arrows for the 2019 Major League Rugby season.

== Honours ==
Uruguay U20

- World Rugby Under 20 Trophy: 2008
