= Alejo Durán (rugby union) =

Uruguayan rugby union player

- Born: 20 May 1991 (age 35)
- Height: 1.70 m (5 ft 7 in)
- Weight: 76 kg (12 st 0 lb; 168 lb)

Rugby union career
- Position(s): Fly-half, Scrum-half
International career
Years	Team	Apps	(Points)
2012-	Uruguay	35	(40)
- Correct as of 10 October 2015

Alejo Durán (born 20 May 1991) is a Uruguayan rugby union player. He was named in Uruguay's squad for the 2015 Rugby World Cup.
