= History of the Argentina national rugby union team =

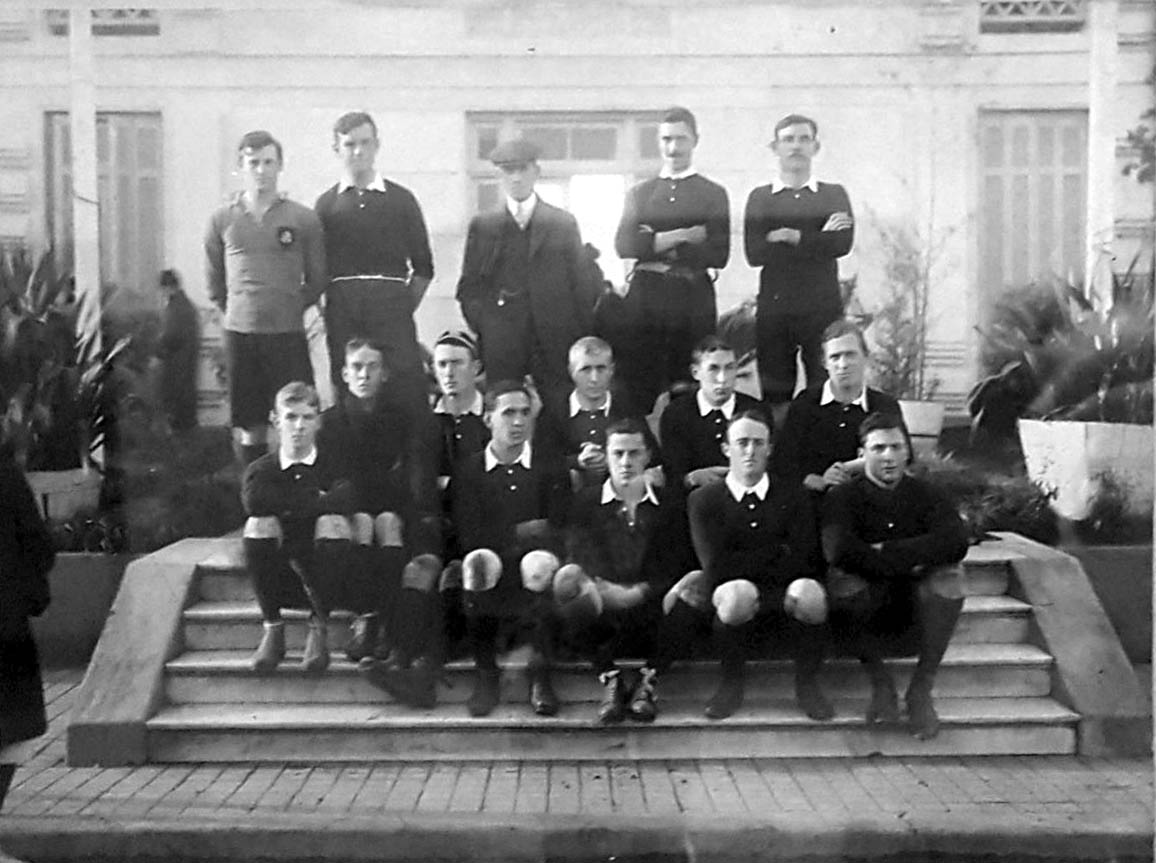
The first Argentina national team ever before playing the British Lions at Sociedad Sportiva Argentina, 12 June 1910

The History of the Argentina national rugby union team starts with the first international played by an Argentine side against the British Isles in 1910 when they toured on South America. Argentina gained recognition in 1965, when the team toured South Africa playing a series of friendly matches there. In that tour the national team was nicknamed Los Pumas, a name that became an identity mark for Argentina, remaining to present days.

Argentina has taken part in all the Rugby World Cups since the first edition in 1987, being their best performance the 3rd place achieved in 2007. The national side also plays the Rugby Championship since the 2012 edition, after joining the competition one year before.

== Background ==
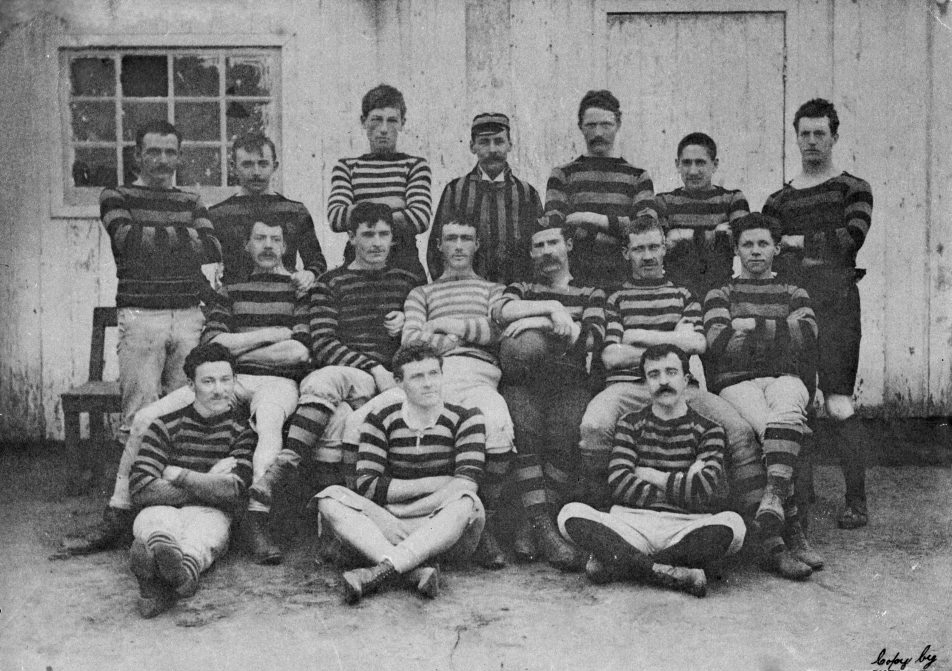
Rosario A.C. squad of 1884, the oldest photo of a rugby team in Argentina.

In the middle of the 19th century, the Irish immigrants in Argentina introduced sports and helped establish clubs in the country, although the first clubs in Argentina only admitted English members. Natives were rarely accepted, most of the cases as an exception.

The first rugby union match in Argentina was played in 1873, in the Buenos Aires Cricket Club Ground, located in Palermo, Buenos Aires. Both teams were formed by members of the BACC and they play a mix between football and rugby.

On 29 June 1886, it is recorded that Buenos Aires F.C. (predecessor of current Buenos Aires Cricket & Rugby Club) and Rosario A.C. played the first inter-club match at Plaza Jewell, Rosario, Santa Fe.

In 1899, four clubs in Argentina's capital, Buenos Aires, joined to form the River Plate Rugby Football Union and organised the first club championship that same year.

== 1910–1936: From the first matches to World War I ==
In 1910, a side managed by Oxford University – supposedly the England national team, but including three Scottish players — toured Argentina as part of the celebrations for the 100th anniversary of the May Revolution. The people of Argentina termed it the "Combined British", also known as "Great Britain XV". Argentina made its international debut against this team under the name "The River Plate Rugby Football Union" on 12 June. The match was played at Sociedad Sportiva Argentina of Palermo and Argentina lost 28–3. The only try for the Argentine squad (the first international try) was scored by Buenos Aires F.C. player Frank Heriot. (Note: Some sources cited C. McCarthy (player of Lomas A.C.) as the author of the first try, instead of Heriot.) The Argentina line-up was: J.E. Saffey; C. McCarthy, Oswald Gebbie (cap), F. Heriot, Henry Talbot; Carlos Mold, W.A. Watson; Barry Heatlie, L.H. Gribell, W.M. Hayman; F. Henrys, F.W. Sawyer; A. Bovet, A. Donelly, Alvan Reid., all of them descendants of British immigrants. Argentina's most notable players were captain Oswald St. John Gebbie and Barrie Heatlie, a South African that had played for the Springboks.

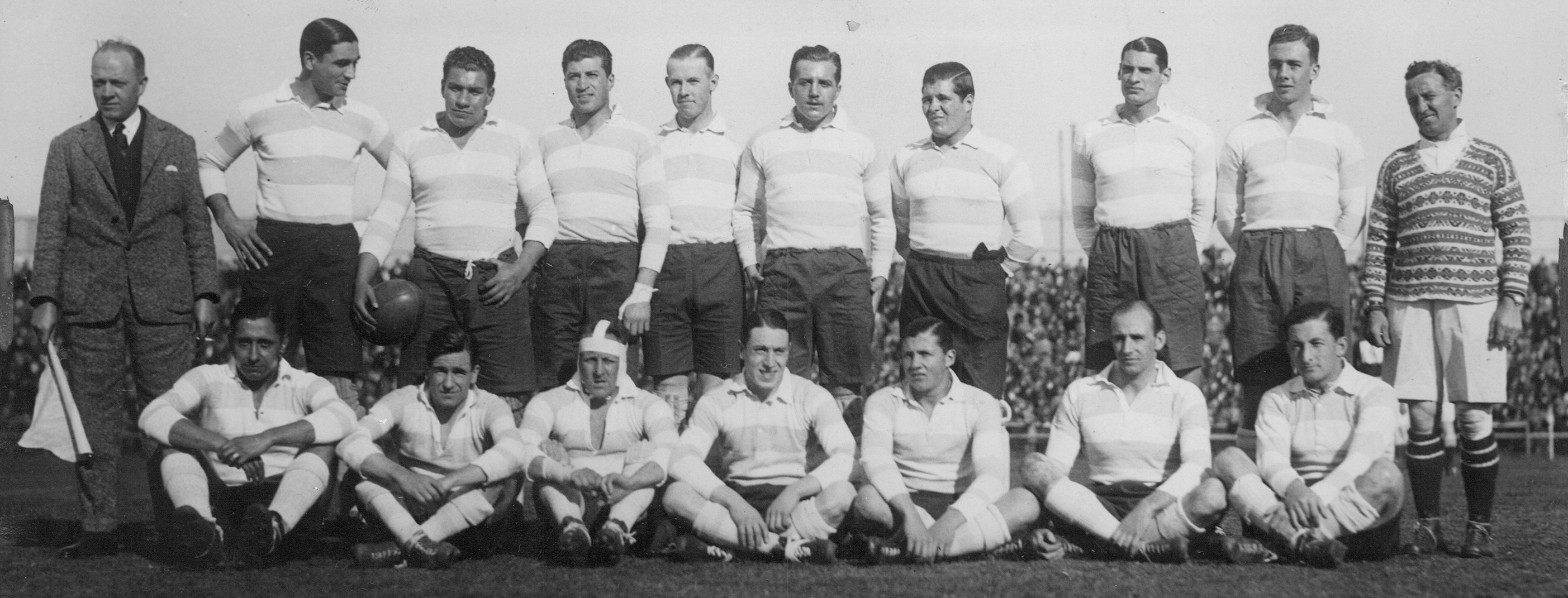
The team that played the first test against the British Lions in 1927

In 1927, the British Lions toured Argentina for a second time, with the Lions winning all nine encounters; the tour did, however, become a financial success for Argentine rugby. Of the nine encounters, four tests were played, which Argentina lost by over 30 points in all. All the games took place in Buenos Aires. The important fact was that all the players on the field were Argentine-born.

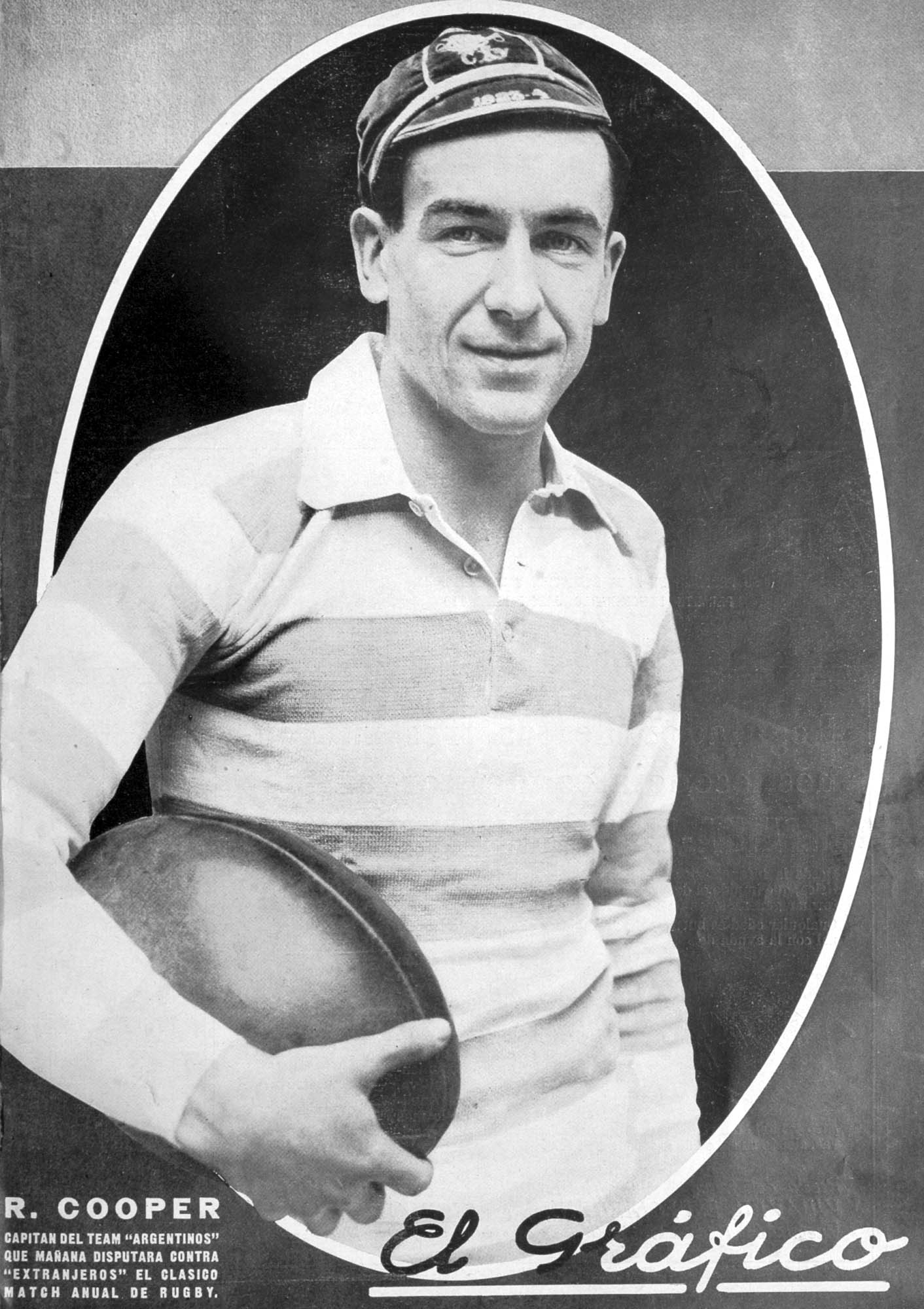
Reginald Cooper, former team captain in 1928

1927 also saw the first time Argentina wore the traditional light blue and white jersey, after a proposal from Mr. Abelardo Gutiérrez of Gimnasia y Esgrima de Buenos Aires. That request was accepted and Argentina wore the striped uniform v. the British Lions.

Five years passed until another international team would return to Argentina, which would be the Junior Springboks, who arrived in the country for the first time in 1932 to play a series of friendly matches v. local clubs and combined teams. On July 16 and 23 the JS played Argentina, winning both matches, 42–0 and 34–3, respectively. The line-up for the first match was R. de Abelleyra; H. Maurer, A. Turner, C. Echeverría, N. Escary; E.J. Stanfield, J.E. Bridger; J.L. Francombe, N. C. Tozer, G.A. Stewart, Ernesto Cilley, A. Navajas, K.A.M. Cookson, Arturo Rodríguez, C.A. Huntley Robertson (captain)

Two of the members of the Junior Springboks, Rybeck Elliot and Wollie Wolheim, would return to Argentina one year later to play for Hindú Club.

In 1936 the British Isles visited Argentina again, winning all ten of their matches and only conceding nine points in the whole tour. Only one test was played on the tour, with Argentina losing 23–0. The following month, Argentina left the country to play their first away tests – against Chile in Valparaíso. Argentina won the first test (and their first game), 29–0. The second match was won by a similar margin. Two years later Argentina hosted Chile, which resulted in Argentina winning by 30 points.

== Post war period ==
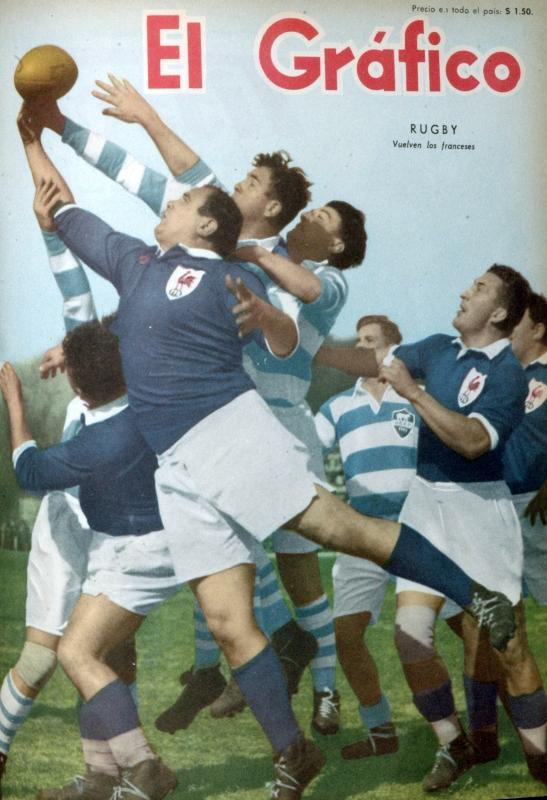
Match played between Argentina and France rugby union teams in 1954, cover of El Gráfico magazine.

Argentina hosted the first South American tournament, in 1951. The other teams participating were Uruguay and Chile.

Argentina won the tournament after large victories over Uruguay (62–0) and Brazil (72–0) being the last v. Chile by 13–3. All the matches were played at Estadio G.E.B.A.

In 1954 the French national team toured Argentina and Chile playing with the national team on August 29 at Gimnasia y Esgrima. Argentina lost the match by 8–22. On September 12, both teams played a second test match at the same venue, with another victory for France which won by 30–3.

At the second South American tournament, in 1958, Argentina accounted for Uruguay 50–3 and Peru 44–0, and finally Argentina emerged victorious against the hosts Chile in Santiago, by 14–0 to win their second title.

In 1959 the Junior Springboks returned to South America to play a series of friendly matches in Buenos Aires and Rosario against local clubs and combined teams. The South African played Argentina in two test-matches at GEBA, winning both fixtures 14–6, and 20–5. The JS played a total of 15 matches in Argentina, winning all of them.

The third edition of the South American competition, in 1961 held in Uruguay found Argentina to win their third consecutive title after defeating Chile (11–3), Brazil (thrashing them by 60–0) and local team Uruguay by 36–3, with all the matches being played at Carrasco Polo of Montevideo.

Argentina won their four South American title in 1964 with victories over Uruguay (25–6), Brazil and Chile (both with the same score, 30–8).

== 1960s: The birth of Los Pumas ==
In 1960, France visited Argentina and Uruguay for a series of 13 matches, 3 of them against Argentina. The hosts still could not get their first win over the French, with France winning all three tests 37–3, 12–3 and 29–6, all of them played at Estadio G.E.B.A. The Argentine line-up for the first game was 15.Rodolfo Devoto, 14.Enrique Krossler, 13.Esteban Karplus, 12.Ricardo Oliveri, 11.Enrico Neri, 10.Isidro Comas (cap), 9.Eduardo González del Solar, 8.Florencio Varela, 7. Glauco Wessek, 6.Jorge Pulido, 5.Aitor Otano, 4.Rodolfo Schmidt, 3.Eduardo Sorhaburu, 2.Juan Casanegra, 1.Elías Gavina

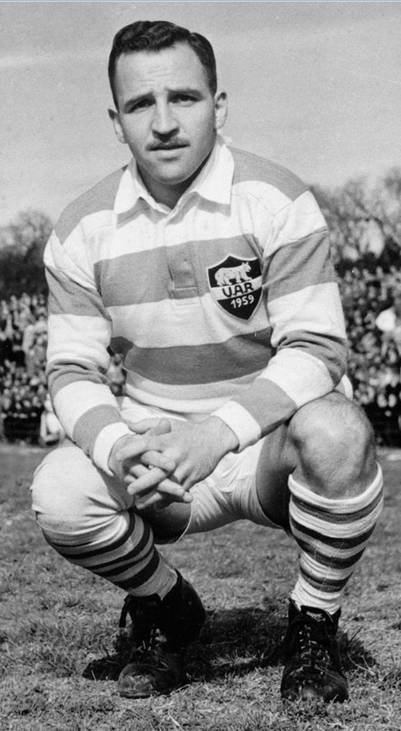
Former player Angel Guastella was the coach of Argentina during the 1965 tour.

The following year Argentina again showed their dominance at continental level, winning the South American tournament held in Montevideo by beating Brazil 60–0, Uruguay 36–3 and Chile 11–3. In 1964, a new version of the South American tournament was played in San Pablo and Argentina again achieved huge victories over Uruguay (25–6), Brazil (30–5) and Chile (30–8).

In the late 1960s, the four home unions began tours of Argentina, and after Wales struggled in both tests in Buenos Aires in 1967, it became clear that Argentina would be a difficult place to win a series. Scotland lost the first test in 1968, but won a close second test two weeks later.

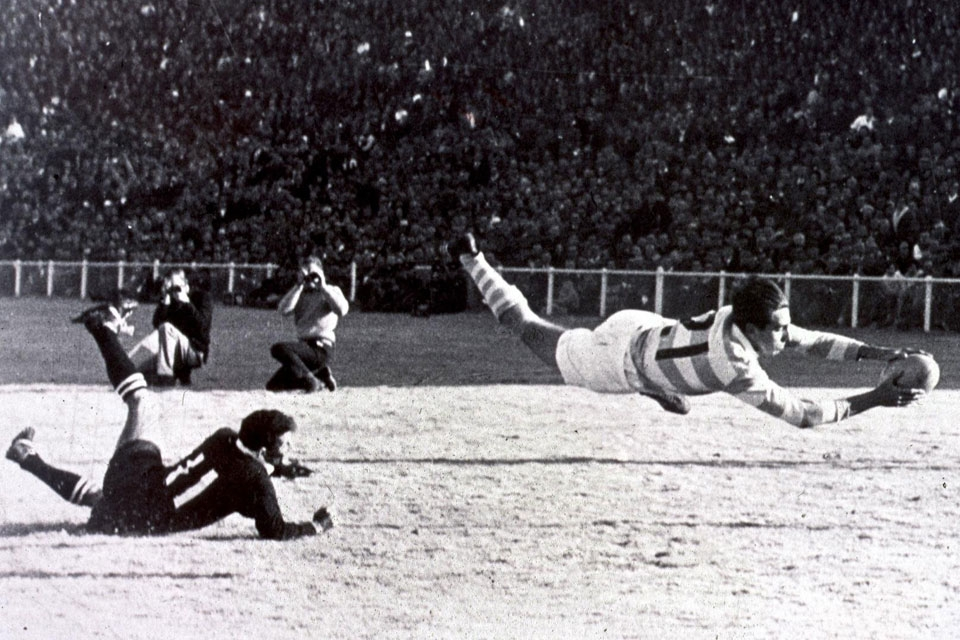
Marcelo Pascual diving in the ingoal of Junior Springboks on June 19, 1965, during the tour of South Africa. That match is considered the beginning of a new era for the national rugby team.

The first trip by the Argentina national rugby team to the other side of the Atlantic was to Rhodesia and South Africa in 1965. The team acquired the nickname Pumas, from a local journalist of The Weekly Farers after their first tour match, a defeat on 8 May by Rhodesia in Salisbury 17–12. The journalist mistook the animal that appeared on the UAR emblem (a yaguareté) for a puma, probably because it was an unknown species in South Africa. Nevertheless, the nickname has remained as a mark of identity for the team since then. After defeats by Salisbury and Northern Transvaal, the first win came against Western Transvaal, another against South West Africa Country Districts and finally against the Southern Universities. The Pumas scored a landmark win of 11–6 against the Junior Springboks on June 19 at Ellis Park Stadium. The line-up for that historic day was Roberto Cazenave; Enrico Neri, Marcelo Pascual, Arturo Rodríguez Jurado (h), Eduardo España; Eduardo Poggi, Adolfo Etchegaray; Raúl Loyola, Héctor Silva, Eduardo Scharenberg; Rodolfo Schmidt, Aitor Otaño (c); Ronnie Foster, Nicanor González del Solar, Luis García Yáñez.

We were walking after stepping off the plane when a journalist (who turned out to be Carl Köhler) asked me about the yaguareté. Because I didn't speak English fluently, I told him the animal was a 'puma'.

— Agustín Silvera, player of Argentina.

That victory over the Junior Springboks was widely praised by the media, being considered as the first landmark victory by the Argentine rugby team since the beginning of the sport in the country. Argentina played a total of 16 matches, with 11 won and only 4 lost over two months. The players were welcomed home to Buenos Aires by a huge crowd.

A match was then organised against the French champions Section Paloise, although the match was remembered for the uproar and misconduct of both teams rather than the Argentine victory. Then Oxford & Cambridge arrived, a team that the Pumas had never beaten. The first match finished level at 19–19 and the second saw the University students triumph 9–3. 1965 ended with a match against Chile, which the Pumas won 23–11.

In 1966, the Gazelles – a kind of a Junior Springboks B team – arrived in Argentina. The visitors took two victories 9–3 and 20–15. In September 1967, Argentina played in Buenos Aires in the South American Championship with victories over Uruguay 38–6 and Chile 18–0. Wales arrived in Buenos Aires in 1968; for the first time in their history, the Pumas were able to triumph in a series, winning the first match 9–5 and drawing the second 9–9. The first great decade in Argentine rugby came to a close with the arrival of Scotland in 1969. The first match saw a big Argentine victory 20–3, but in the second game the visitors narrowly won 6–3.

In 1968, Wales toured Argentina to play six games. Argentina defeated Wales in the first test by 9–6, with the following line-up: 15.Jorge Seaton, 14.Mario Walther, 13.Arturo Rodriguez Jurado, 12.Marcelo Pascual, 11.Alejandro Travaglini, 10.Jorge Dartiguelongue, 9.Adolfo Etchegaray, 7.Miguel Chesta, 8. Hector Silva, 6.Raul Loyola, 5.Aitor Otano, 4.Adrian Anthony, 3.Marcelo Farina, 2.Ricardo Handley, 1.Luis Garcia Yanez. The second test finished in a 9–9 tie.

== The 1970s: multiple tours ==
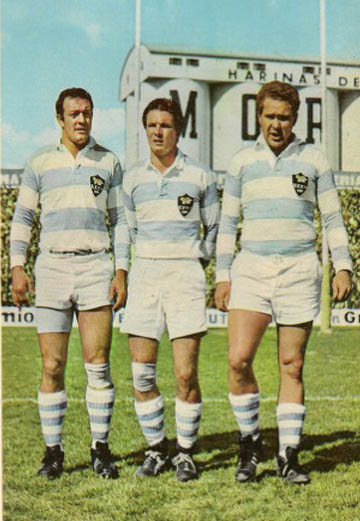
The forward line of 1970: García Yáñez, Handley and Foster

Through the 1970s, Argentina confirmed its steady rise towards top-tier status under the influence of its first truly world-class player, fly-half Hugo Porta.

In 1971, Argentina did a second tour of South Africa that included a series of 14 matches played in June and July. The "Pumas" didn't play against the Springboks (playing meanwhile in Australia, but against the Gazelles, the selection of emerging under-23 players). There was also originally scheduled a match in Rhodesia, but it was cancelled after a prohibition by the Argentine government. Argentina won 9 games, being defeated 4 times. The line-up v. the Gazelles was D. Morgan; M. Pascual, R. Matarazzo, A. Rodríguez Jurado (h), A. Travaglini; R. Espagnol, G. Blaksley; H. Silva (c), J. Wittman, N. Carbone; B. Otaño, A. Anthony; R. Foster, R. Handley, L. García Yáñez.

Two years later, Los Pumas went on a tour to Ireland and Scotland, playing 8 matches in October and November. Argentina won only two games, losing four with two draws. In the matches v. national sides, Argentina lost to Ireland by 21–8 on November 10. The other game vs a national team was v. Scotland, 14 days later, which Argentina lost by 12–11.

The second Argentine tour of Europe came in 1975, when the team played seven matches in France during October. Argentina won 3 matches, with 4 losses, two of them vs. the France national team (29–6 and 36–21). One year later, Argentina went on a tour of Wales and England to play 6 matches. During their tour, the Pumas came tantalizingly close to a historic victory at Cardiff Arms Park over Wales, then the dominant force in the Northern Hemisphere. Only a Phil Bennett penalty on a foul by Gabriel Travaglini at the death allowed the Welsh to escape with a 20–19 victory. The line-up for Argentina v. Wales was Martin Sansot; Daniel Beccar Varela, Alejandro Travaglini, Gonzalo Beccar Varela, Jorge Gauweloose; Hugo Porta, Adolfo Etchegaray (C); Jorge Carracedo, Ricardo Mastai, Carlos Neyra; José Fernández, Eliseo Branca; Rito Iraneta, Jose Costante, Fernando Insúa. Argentina played a total of 6 matches, winning 3 with 3 losses. Some of the club teams Argentina faced were Cardiff and Aberavon.

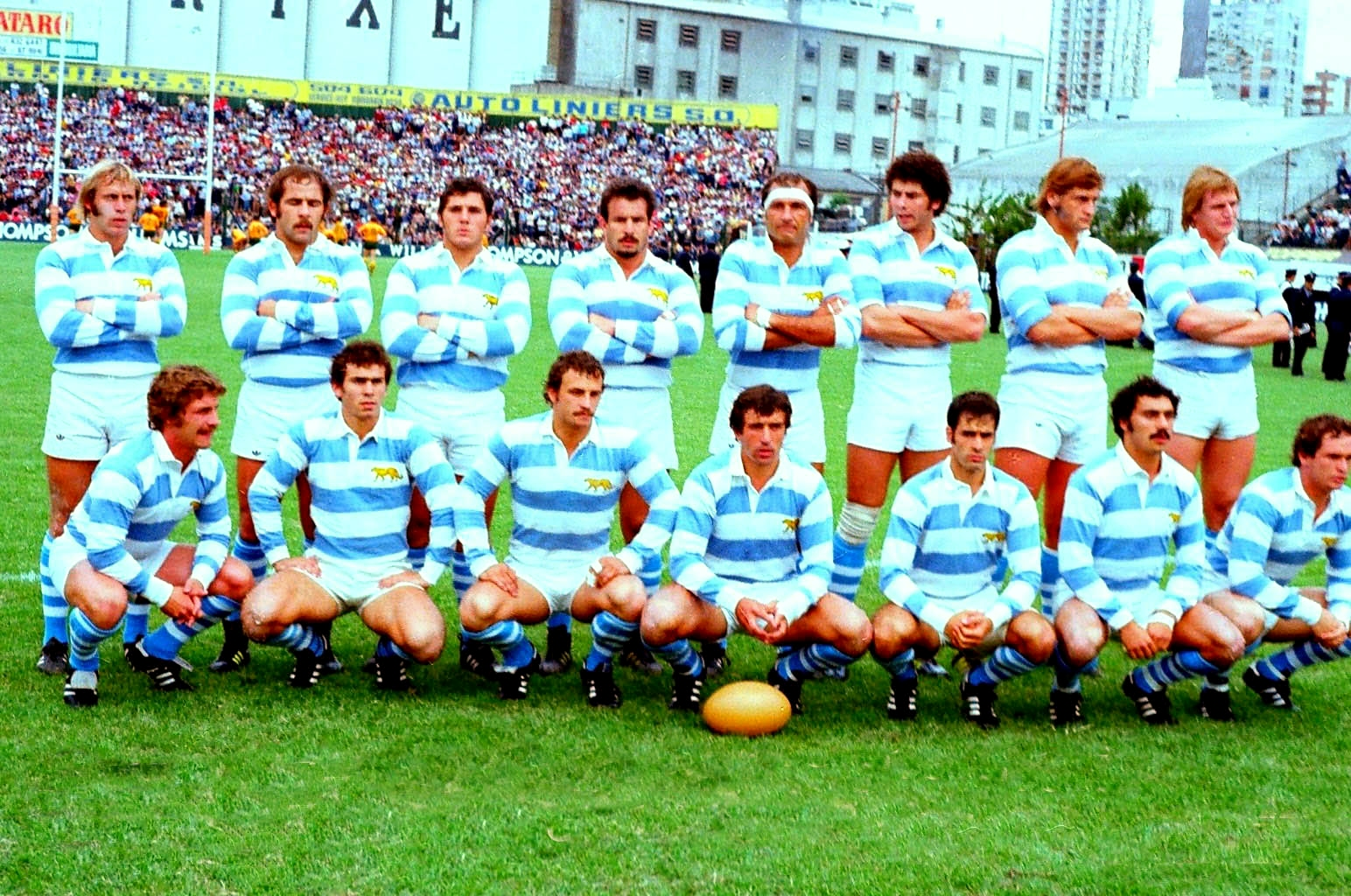
The team that beat Australia in 1979 in Buenos Aires.

Two years later Argentina returned to participate in competitions for their tour of England, Ireland and Italy. The team held a virtually full-strength England XV to a 13–13 draw, before losing 6–19 to Italy in the first test match between them. Argentina also played the Wales B team, being beaten by 17–14. The tour captain, Hugo Porta, played all nine games, scored 94 of the team's 157 points on tour and established himself as one of the world's great players on the tour.

The last tour of the Argentine side was in 1979, when the team travelled to New Zealand to play a series of nine games. Argentina won 6 of them, losing 3 games. On September 18, Argentina played the All Blacks for the first time in their history. The match, held at Carisbrook, was won by New Zealand by 18–9. The Argentine line-up was Martín Sansot; Adolfo Cappelletti, Marcelo Loffreda, Rafael Madero, Marcelo Ocampo; Hugo Porta, Alfredo Soares Gache; Gabriel Travaglini, Tomas Petersen, Héctor Silva; Marcos Iachetti, Alejandro Iachetti; Enrique Rodriguez, Javier Pérez Cobo, Hugo Nicola. The second test-match, played one week later, ended in another victory for New Zealand by 15–6.

That same year, the Australian side toured Argentina for the first time. During October and November, Australia played a series of seven games. In the first test match, Argentina defeated Australia by 24–13 on October 27 at Ferro Carril Oeste stadium. In the second game (played on November 3), Argentina was defeated by 17–12.

== 1980s: growth in importance ==
During the 1980s, several teams toured South America, including Argentina. This allowed the Pumas to face some of the most important sides of the world, such as England, France, New Zealand and Australia national rugby union team. From the late seventies to the early nineties, Argentina never lost the two matches of a series held in Buenos Aires.

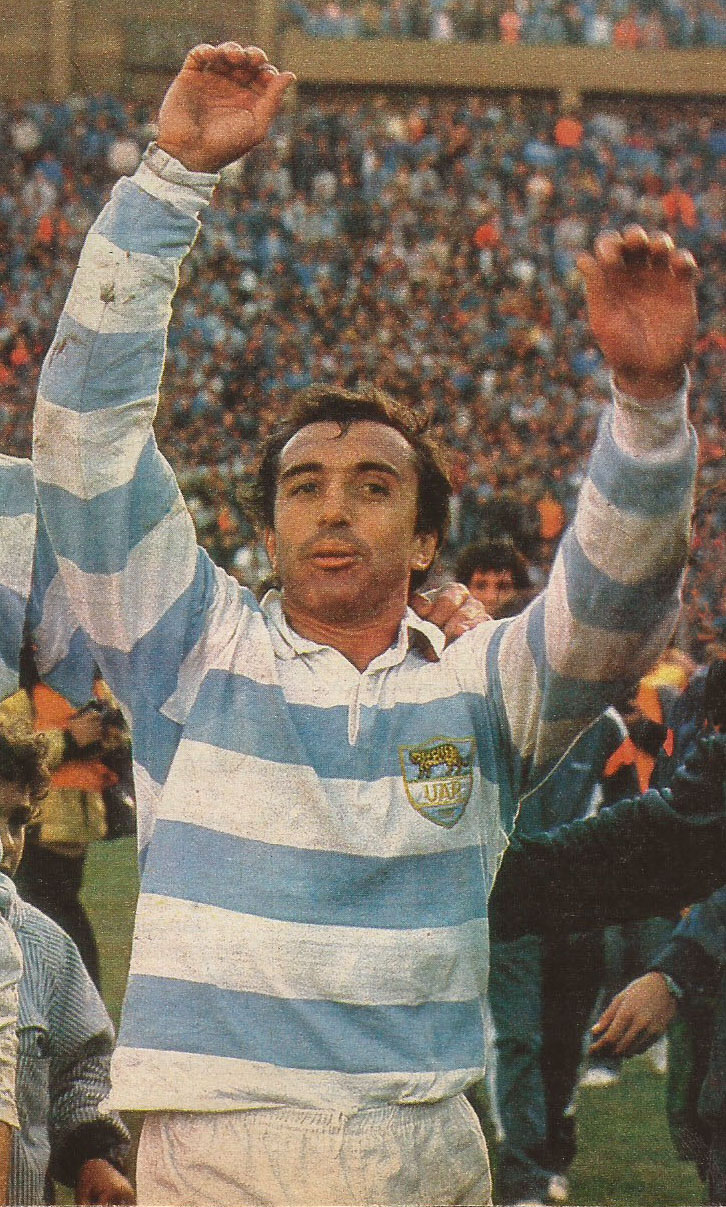
Hugo Porta played 19 years for the Pumas, scoring 590 points.

After the British Lions visits in 1909 and 1927, the England national team arrived in Argentina for the first time in 1981. The English side played seven matches in the country, with Argentina achieving a 19–19 tie at Ferro Carril Oeste stadium on May 31. Six days later, England won the second test by 12–6.

In 1985 France toured South America, playing a series of 7 matches in Argentina. The national side achieved its first victory over a French national team, a 24–16 victory on 22 June at Ferro Carril Oeste stadium. The line-up was: B. Miguens; J. Lanza, Turnes, Cuesta Silva, Annichini; Porta, J. Miguens; Allen, Ure, Petersen; Milano, Branca; Cash, Cubelli, Morel. The second test match would be won by France.

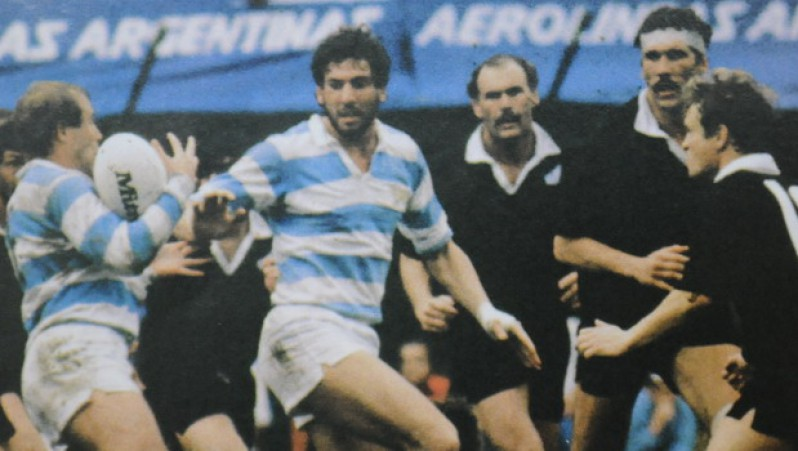
Los Pumas achieved a 21–21 tie v. the All Blacks on Nov 2, 1985.

That same year, Los Pumas played the All Blacks, who were doing a tour of the country to play a series of matches in October and November. Argentina lost the first match by 33–20. Nevertheless, the national side achieved a historic 21–21 tie on November 2 at Ferro C. Oeste, with all points converted by Hugo Porta. The line-up for that notable match was Diego Cash; Alejandro Cubelli, Fernando Morel; Eliseo Branca, Gustavo Milano; Tomás Petersen, Jorge Allen, Ernesto Ure; Guillermo Holmgren, Hugo Porta (c); Pedro Lanza, Diego Cuesta Silva, Fabián Turnes, Juan Lanza, Bernardo Miguens. Due to those results, some journalists widely regard 1985 as the best year in Los Pumas' history.

France returned to Argentina in 1986 as part of their Oceania tour. Argentina achieved their second victory over France on May 31 by 15–13 at Vélez Sársfield stadium in Buenos Aires. Seven days later, Argentina was defeated by France at the same venue.

In 1987, Argentina played the first Rugby World Cup held in New Zealand and Australia. The team had a poor campaign, losing to Fiji and New Zealand in the pool stage, with only one victory over Italy. The team finished 3rd of Pool 3, being eliminated.

After the WC, Australia arrived in Argentina in 1987 to play a series of nine matches. Argentina remained unbeaten in the two test-matches played vs. the Australian side, with a 19–19 tie in the first game and an outstanding victory by 27-19 in the second match on November 7 at Vélez Sársfield. The line-up was Rafael Madero; Diego Cuesta Silva, Marcelo Loffreda, Fabián Turnes, A. Scolni; H. Porta (c), A.Soares Gache; J. Allen, G. Milano, P. Garretón; A. Iachetti, E. Branca; Diego Cash, A. Courreges, Serafín Dengra.

France toured again in 1988 (the third time that decade). Argentina lost the first test by 15–18 and won the second, played on June 25, by 18–6. The line-up was A. Scolni; D. Cuesta Silva, Loffreda, Turnes, Mendy; R. Madero, Baetti; Allen (c), Milano, Garretón; Iachetti, Branca; Cash, Courreges, Dengra. Both games were played at Vélez Sarsfield.

== 1990s: process of transition ==
Over the following years, the retirement of many of Argentina's most experienced players, and the defection of many others to professional leagues (UAR's regulations of the time prevented any player who played professionally from playing for the national team) left Argentina with an inexperienced side. This led to disappointing performances in the 1991 and 1995 World Cups, although in the latter Argentina presented a powerful pack which was praised by the international media. Argentina's tighthead prop, Patricio Noriega and hooker, Federico Méndez, went to play in Australia and South Africa respectively after their performance. Noriega even played for the Wallabies.

The Pumas toured the British Isles in 1990, playing their first away match versus the England senior team and their first ever test-matches versus the Ireland and Scotland senior squads. Although Argentina had a two-point loss to Ireland (20–18), the squad was smashed by England (51–0) and Scotland (49–3).

In 1991 the All Blacks returned to Argentina. The national team was defeated in both tests, 28–14 and 36–6, at Vélez Sársfield.

Argentina went on a new tour of Europe in 1992, where the team defeated Spain, Romania and France (24–22). Two years later Argentina toured South Africa to play six matches, losing both tests to the Springboks (42–22 and 46–26). The 1995 tour of Australia continued with poor results, losing to the national side (53–7 and 30–13). In 1996 Argentina went to England, losing 20–18 at Twickenham. The 1997 tour on New Zealand found Argentina being heavily defeated by the All Blacks (93–8 –the biggest defeat in the team's history– and 62–10). One year later, Argentina would be beaten by Japan, Italy, France and Wales in the same tour. The only positive result for the national side was a 31–22 victory over 1999 Five Nations Championship Scotland on August 21 at the Murrayfield Stadium, during the 1999 tour of the British Isles.

A more experienced and somewhat under-rated squad made it to the World Cup quarter-finals for the first time. In the WC, Argentina lost the first game to Wales (23–18), then defeating Samoa (32–16) and Japan (33–12), finishing second in their group to Wales, and went onto the quarter-final play-offs. After a vibrant 28–24 win against Ireland, the Pumas were eliminated by France, 28–47, in the quarter-final. Gonzalo Quesada was the highest overall points scorer in the tournament with 102. The outstanding performance by Quesada earned him the Olimpia de Oro (Golden Olimpia), the top sports award of Argentina.

== The new millennium ==
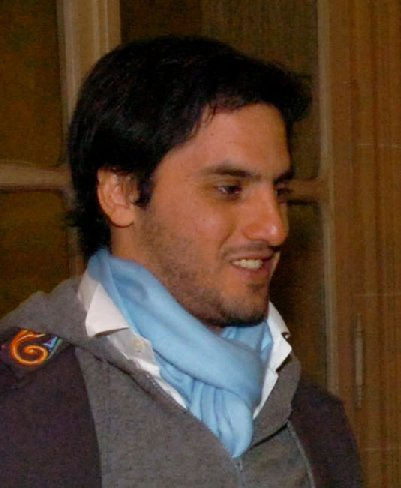
Agustín Pichot stayed in Los Pumas from 1995 to 2008, having played four World Cups.

In April 2000, Marcelo Loffreda was appointed coach of Argentina. Argentina participated in the 2003 World Cup, but missed out on progressing to the quarter-finals due to a 15–16 loss to Ireland. Because of the fixture list, Argentina had to play four games in a fortnight, whereas Ireland played the same number of games in four weeks.

In 2004 Argentina showed good form, splitting a midyear two-test home series with Wales. Los Pumas handed defending Six Nations champion France a 24–14 loss in November 2004 at Marseille, before losing 21–19 to Ireland on a last-minute drop goal. After returning to Argentina, the Pumas lost 39–7 to the visiting Springboks; however, the Pumas were without 10 regular starters who had returned to their club teams in Europe.

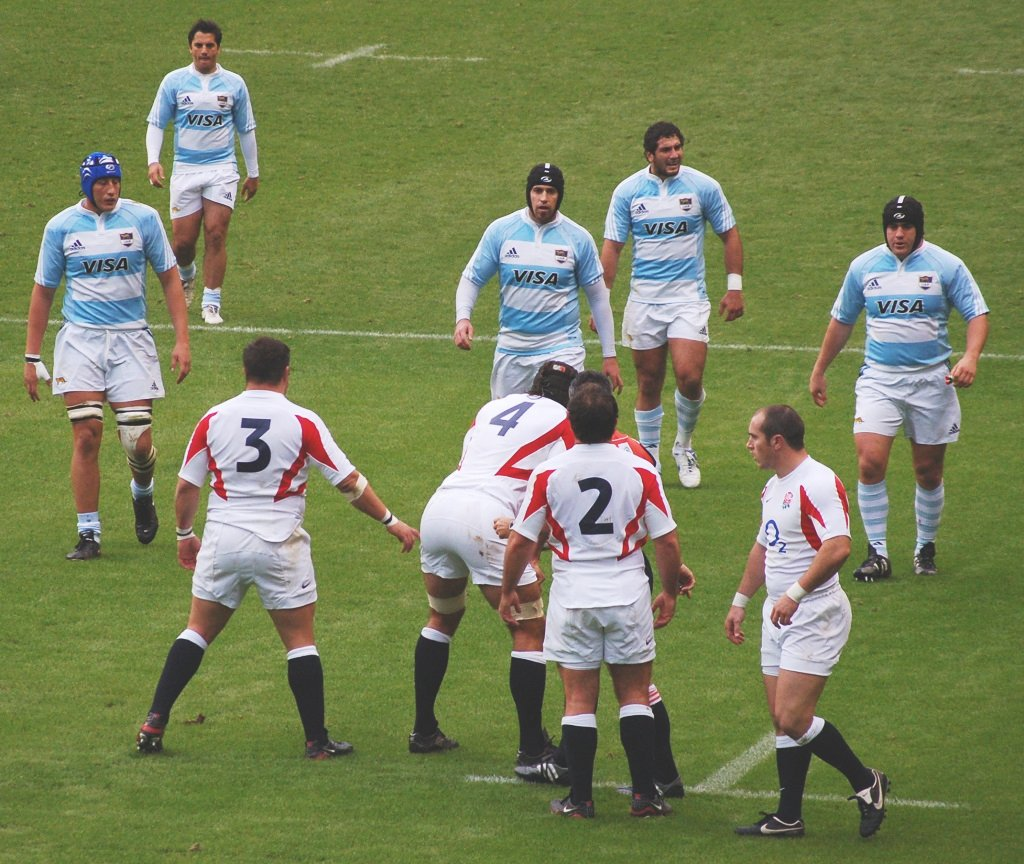
The Pumas during their November 2006 win over England at Twickenham.

Perhaps one of the Pumas' best matches of the decade came on 23 May 2005, when they played the British & Irish Lions in Cardiff before the Lions' tour to New Zealand. The Pumas chose a side of second- and third-choice players as 25 players were unavailable due to club commitments. An inspired Pumas performance, combined with lacklustre play by a mostly second-choice Lions side, put Argentina on the verge of a great upset until a Jonny Wilkinson penalty at the death salvaged a 25–25 draw and the Lions avoided a humiliating defeat. When the Springboks returned to Argentina in November of that year at Vélez Sársfield, they faced a much stronger Pumas side, with most of their European-based players present. The Pumas took a 20–16 lead into the half-time break, before fading the second half and losing 34–23. The following week, the Pumas defeated Scotland 23–19 Murrayfield for the Pumas fifth consecutive win over Scotland since 1990.

In the 2006 mid-year tests, Argentina swept Wales in a two-test tour for their first test series win over Wales. Argentina won the first test 27–25, in the first Argentina test in Patagonia. The second test at Vélez Sársfield saw the Pumas win 45–27, Argentina's largest win ever over Wales. Los Pumas next hosted the All Blacks at Vélez Sársfield. The All Blacks survived a Pumas assault in the final minutes to hang on to win 25–19 and to deny Argentina a huge upset. Argentina then defeated Chile 60–13 in Santiago and defeated Uruguay 26–0 at home to qualify for the 2007 Rugby World Cup. The 2006 end-of-year Tests began with a bang for Los Pumas, as they handed England a 25–18 defeat at Twickenham, resulting in the fans booing the England team off the pitch. Further success followed for the Pumas, defeating Italy in Rome, and coming within one point of beating France in Paris.

The Sunday Times of London reported in February 2007 that the IRB was brokering a deal with SANZAR, the body that organises the Tri Nations, to admit Los Pumas to the competition. However, The Sunday Times indicated that one of the biggest stumbling blocks was the UAR's commitment to amateurism. By August of that year, it became clear that the competition would not be expanded until the key SANZAR media contract with News Corporation expired in 2010. An IRB spokesman noted the contract, Southern Hemisphere fixture congestion, and the lack of a professional structure in Argentina as reasons that Los Pumas could not be admitted any sooner.

== 2007 World Cup semifinal ==
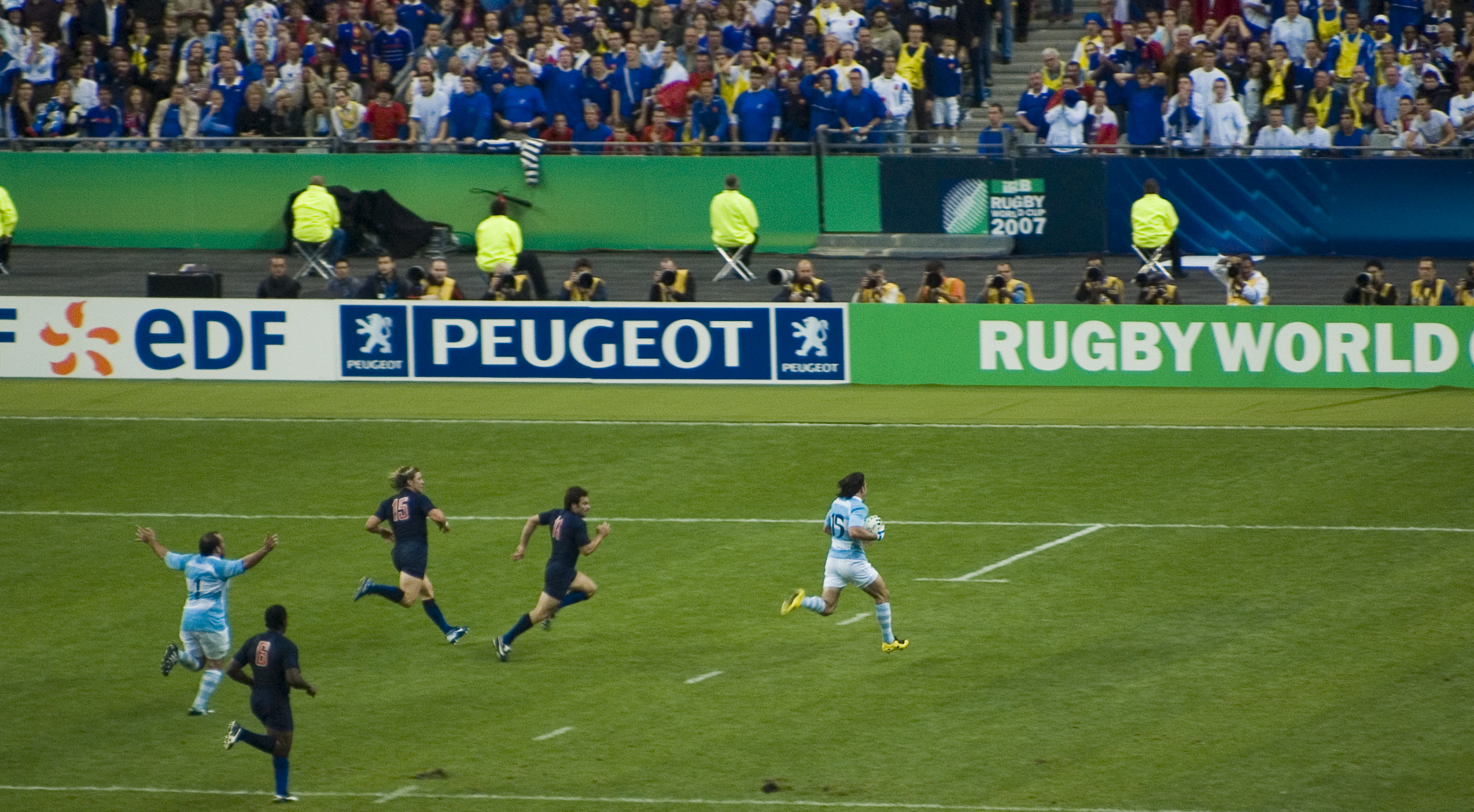
Ignacio Corleto, on his way to score a try against France at the 2007 Rugby World Cup.

Los Pumas began their final preparation for the 2007 Rugby World Cup with a summer two-test series against visiting Ireland, with a 22–20 win at Santa Fe, and a 16–0 win at Vélez Sársfield. Los Pumas then completed a clean sweep of their mid-year tests with a 24–6 win over Italy in Mendoza. They split their final warmup tests, defeating Chile 70–14 at CASI in Buenos Aires, before losing to Wales 20–27 at Millennium Stadium.

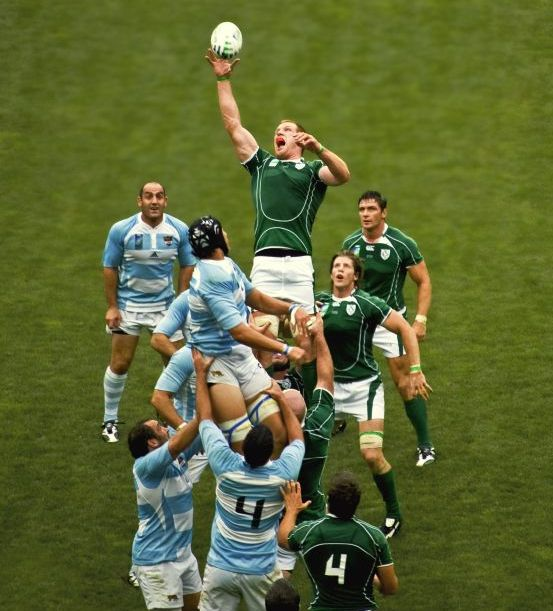
Argentina against Ireland during the 2007 Rugby World Cup held in France.

At the World Cup, Los Pumas were drawn into the so-called pool of death, featuring two other teams ranked in the top six in the IRB rankings—Ireland and the hosts France. On top of this, they opened the World Cup at Stade de France against the French, marking the third consecutive World Cup in which they played against the host nation in the World Cup opener. The Pumas took a 17–9 lead into the half, and held on for a surprising 17–12 win. The Pumas subsequently beat Georgia 33–3 at the Stade de Gerland, Lyon. Argentina then beat Namibia 63–3 in Marseille, the biggest winning margin in Argentine World Cup history. They then secured a 30–15 victory against Ireland, which ensured that Argentina topped the group.

Argentina then defeated Scotland 19–13 in the quarter-final at the Stade de France. The Pumas' improbable run towards the Webb Ellis trophy ended in a comprehensive 37–13 defeat by the Springboks in the semi-final at Stade de France. However, the Pumas recovered to beat France for the second time in the 2007 Rugby World Cup, a 34–10 win in the 3rd/4th place playoff. The 3rd place showing for the Pumas in the 2007 Rugby World Cup was Argentina's best ever result in Rugby World Cup history. Argentina's performance marked the first time that a team from outside the Six Nations or Tri Nations competition reached the semifinals of the Rugby World Cup, and gave renewed momentum propelling Argentina towards joining one of those competitions.

During their World Cup run, the normally football-crazed Argentines embraced the Pumas so much that El Superclásico, the Buenos Aires football derby between Boca Juniors and River Plate, was rescheduled so that it would not conflict with the Pumas' quarter-final match. As the only major Spanish language country in the 2007 Rugby World Cup, the Pumas also had considerable support from rugby fans in Spain, Uruguay, and other Latin American countries during their impressive five-game winning streak.

== After the 2007 World Cup ==
In November 2007, in the wake of Argentina's World Cup run, the future status of Los Pumas was a key topic of discussion at an IRB conference on the future worldwide growth of the sport. The decisions made at the conference regarding Argentina were:

- The Pumas will play more annual tests, increasing from the previous six tests per year to nine by 2010. The team would play four tests in the June test window, three in November, and two during the Six Nations window in February and March.
- Between 2008 and 2010, Argentina would develop a domestic professional structure, with the goal of having the majority of Argentine professionals playing at home. Sometime around 2012, Los Pumas will then be "fully integrated into the Southern top-flight Rugby playing structure" (read "Tri Nations").

On March 13, 2008, Santiago Phelan was named as the coach of the Argentine rugby union team, filling the vacancy left by Marcelo Loffreda. On 7 June 2008, the Pumas beat Scotland 21–15 in Rosario, Argentina, thus maintaining their position as the third highest ranked team in the IRB rankings.

In June 2009 the British media reported that Argentina were lobbying for the 2013 British & Irish Lions tour to Australia to incorporate provincial games and test matches in Argentina, but nothing came of this proposal.

Argentina failed to get a test series victory under Phelan, with a draw against Scotland in 2008 and England in 2009, before losing 2–0 to Scotland in 2010.

== 2011 Rugby World Cup ==
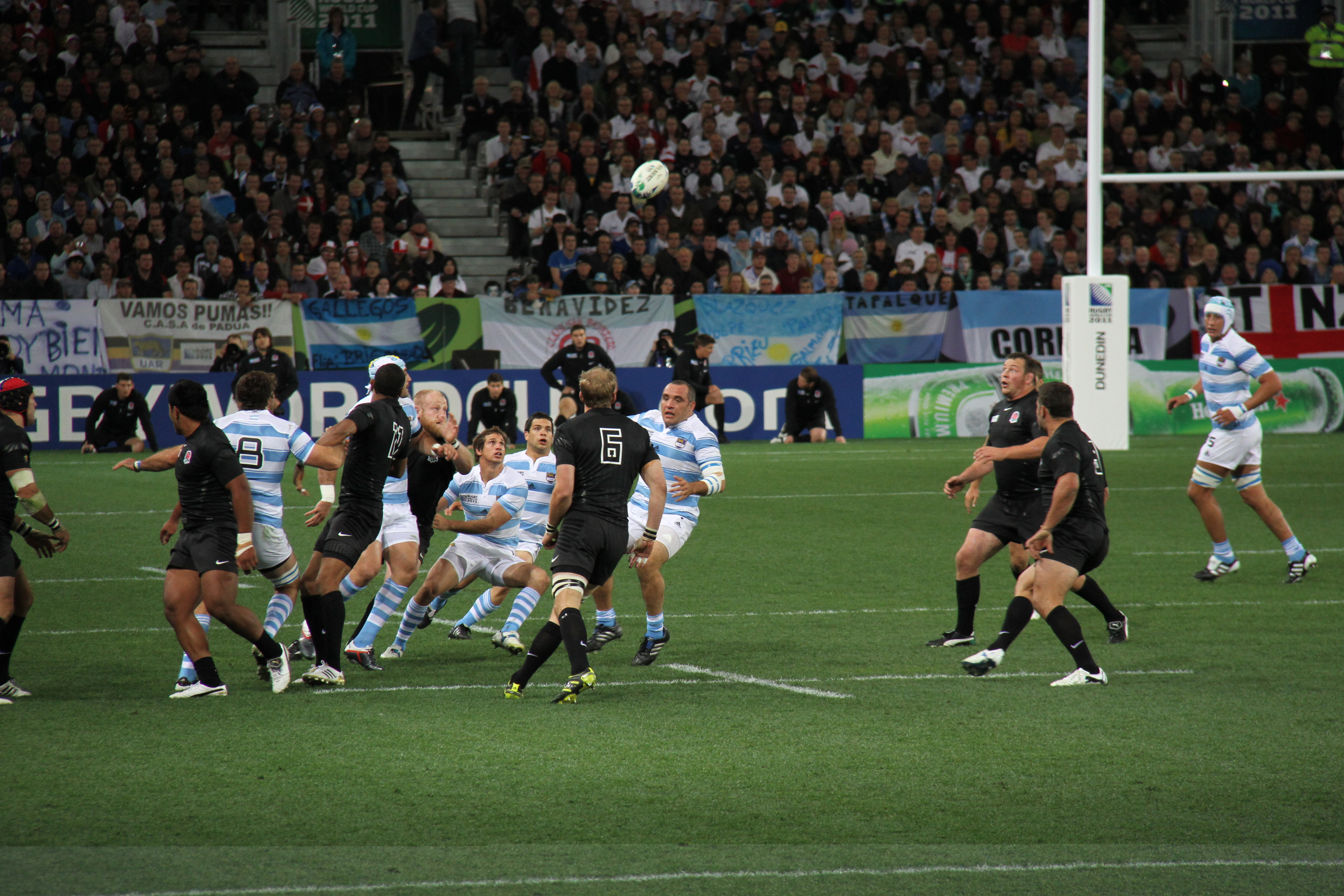
Los Pumas against England during the RWC 2011 in New Zealand.

World Cup preparations for Los Pumas began with a drawn 1–1 series against the French Barbarians, a 78–15 win against a South American Invitational XV, and a 21–15 victory against the Aviva Premiership club Worcester Warriors. In their only international test warm-up match, Los Pumas lost 28–13 to Wales in Cardiff.

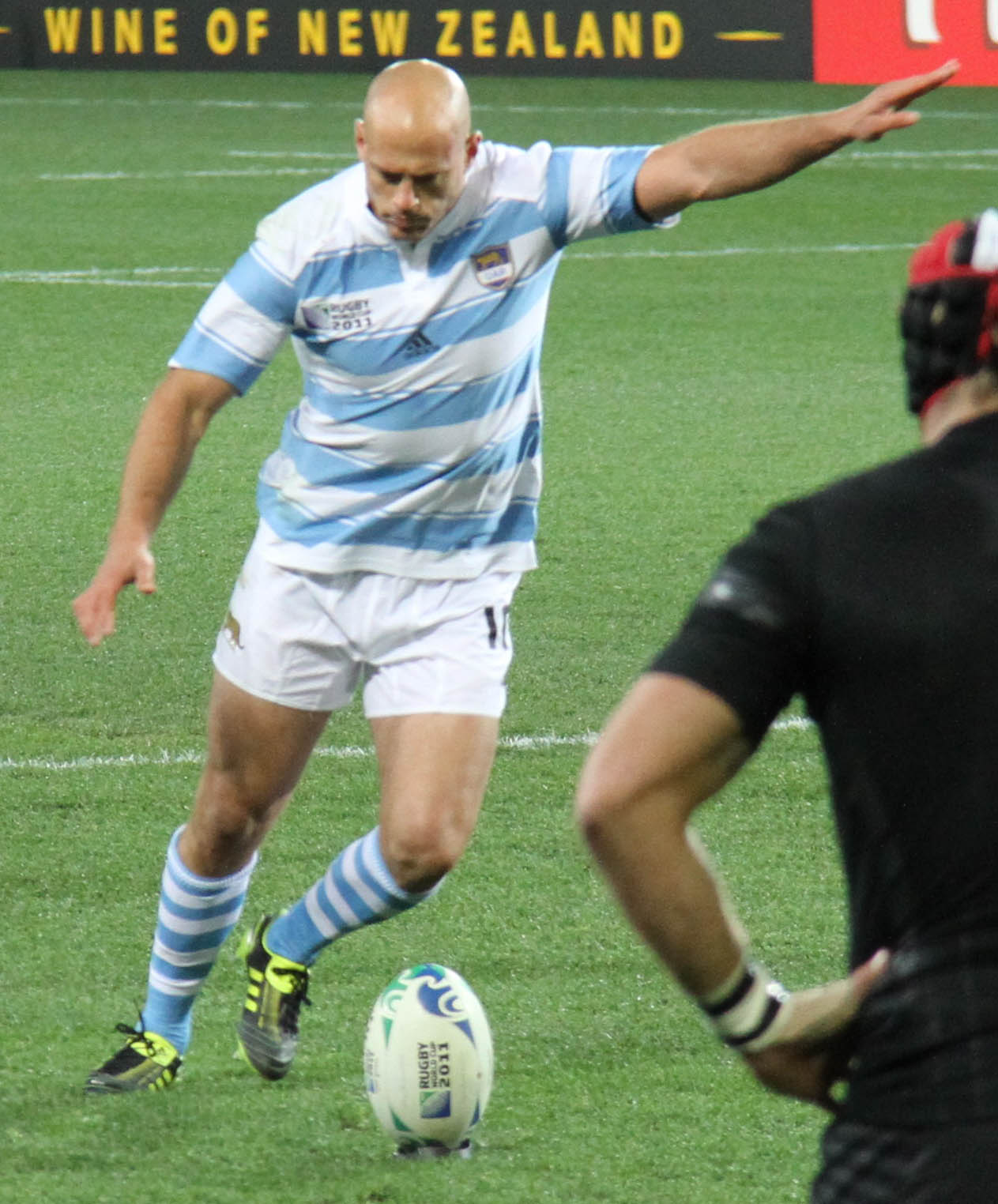
Felipe Contepomi, captain of Los Pumas during the RWC 2011.

Los Pumas kicked off their 2011 World Cup with a 13–9 loss against England, a match which they led for over 60 minutes. They next beat Romania 43–8. The following match against Scotland decided which team would reach the quarterfinals. A late try by replacement fullback Lucas González Amorosino and a successful conversion meant Los Pumas won 13–12. Argentina finished the pool stage by winning 25–9 against Georgia.

Argentina's final match of the tournament was the quarterfinal against eventual champions All Blacks. In a surprisingly close first half, Argentina led 7–6 after 30 minutes following a try by Julio Farías Cabello. As the game went on, the All Blacks began to dominate, leading to a final score of 33–10.

While not as glamorous as the 2007 tournament for the Pumas, their campaign was considered relatively successful as they qualified for the quarterfinals from a pool that featured England and Scotland, and put up a valiant quarterfinal display against the All Blacks. It marked the first time that Argentina qualified for the quarterfinals in two consecutive World Cup tournaments.

== 2012: The Rugby Championship ==
In 2012, Argentina again drew a test series against France.

2012 saw a major breakthrough for the Pumas, as they joined The Rugby Championship (formerly known as the Tri Nations) against New Zealand, Australia and South Africa. This was the first time Argentina participated in an annual Tier 1 international competition.

Argentina played its first match of the 2012 Rugby Championship against South Africa in Cape Town on 18 August 2012, losing 27–6. Argentina quickly recovered one week later in Mendoza to achieve a 16–16 score against South Africa, its first draw in history against the Springboks. Argentina acquitted themselves well against Australia, losing 19–23 and then 19–25 to earn a losing bonus point in each match. Argentina also played respectably against the All Blacks in New Zealand, with Argentina keeping the score 5–6 at the half before losing 5–21. Despite ending bottom of the table with just 4 points and no wins in their inaugural season, Argentina proved hard to beat when home.

In the November 2012 test series, Argentina beat Wales at the Millennium Stadium, and lost against France and Ireland also on the road. In June 2013, the team lost both matches against England in Argentina, and beat tier 2 squad Georgia.

Argentina lost 2–0 to England in 2013 including a record 32–3 defeat in the opening test, the biggest losing margin Argentina has had against England on home soil. Argentina achieved the occasional "upset", including a 9–6 win over Scotland at Murrayfield Stadium in Edinburgh and a 26–12 win over Wales, who at the time were the Six Nations Grand Slam Champions, at the Millennium Stadium in Cardiff.

In 2013, Argentina began their second tournament with a record breaking 73–13 defeat by South Africa, which was South Africa's biggest winning margin over Argentina. In the reverse fixture at home in round 2, Argentina proved to be a formidable team, but lost narrowly to South Africa 17–22.

In round 3 they played New Zealand who was victorious in the match 28–13. In Round 4, they lost to Australia in Perth 14–13. In the corresponding home fixture, Argentina lost 54–17 to Australia, a record losing margin against Australia at home. It was the second year in a row with Argentina finishing bottom of the table at the Rugby Championship, this time losing all matches.

On October 21, 2013, Phelan stepped down from his post as Los Pumas head coach, one year early from the end of his contract. Over the 45 matches that he coached in his 5-year tenure, he earned 13 wins, 31 defeats and 1 draw.

Daniel Hourcade was hired as new Pumas head coach in October 2013. In November 2013, the Pumas were beaten by England and Wales in Twickenham and Cardiff, and later won against Italy in Rome. In the 2014 mid-year rugby union internationals, Argentina lost their games against Ireland and Scotland.

On 5 October 2014, Los Pumas achieved their first ever win in the Rugby Championship, defeating Australia 21–17 at the Estadio Malvinas Argentinas in Mendoza, their first win over Australia in 17 years. Despite that win, Argentina finished in last place in the Rugby Championship for the third consecutive year.

In the 2014 European end-of-year tests, Argentina lost to Scotland, and beat Italy and France,

In the 2015 Rugby Championship, Argentina beat South Africa for the first time 37–25.

In the 2020 edition, again convert in a Tri Nations format because of the Pandemic, (South Africa did not play), Argentina defeat the All Blacks for the first time in history. Argentina dominated in almost every facet to notch a deserved 25-15 victory at Sydney's Bankwest Stadium. Fly half Nicolas Sánchez scored all 25 points.

== 2015 Rugby World Cup ==
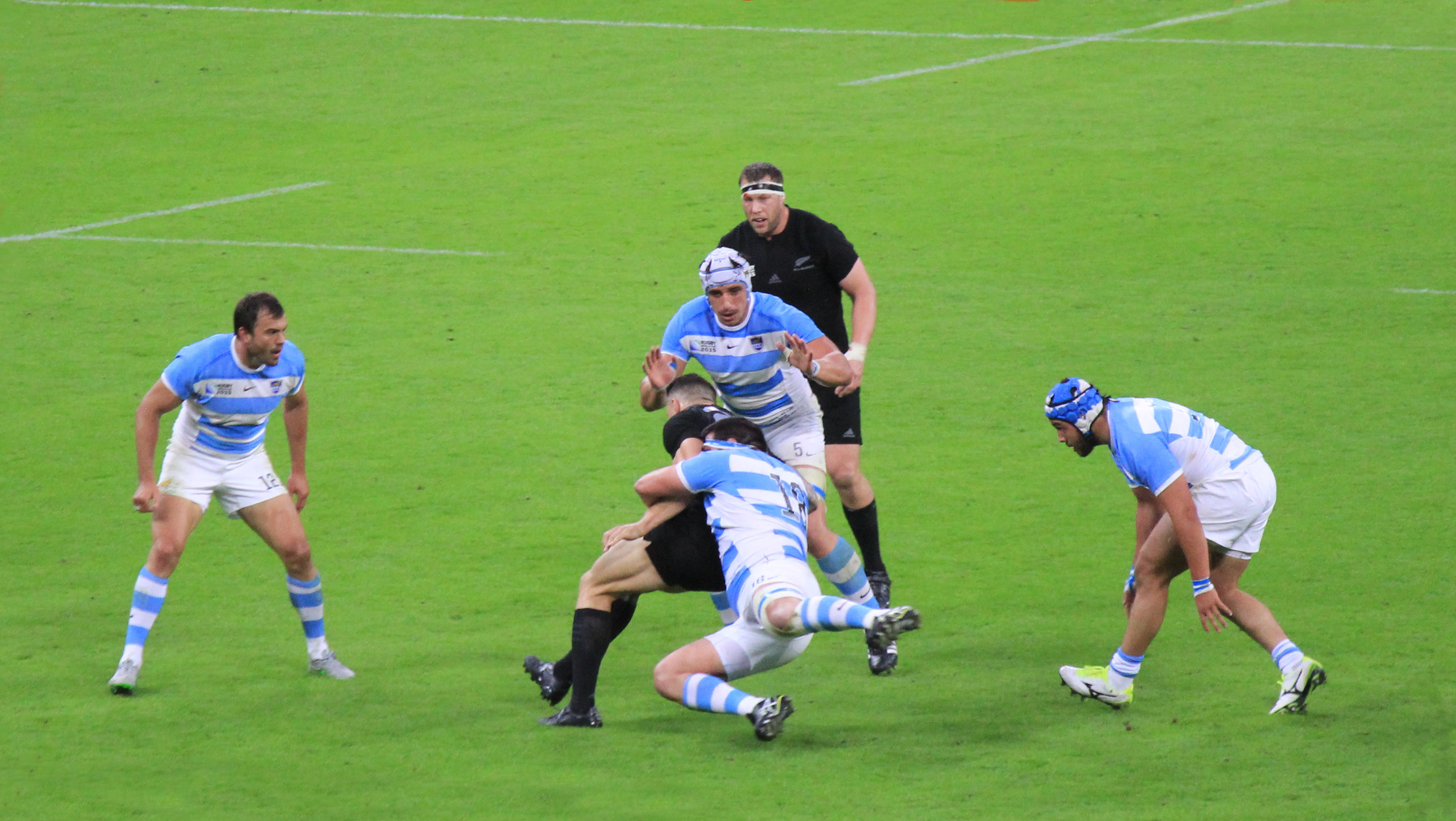
Los Pumas against the All Blacks, in the Wembley Stadium during the RWC 2015.

Argentina followed their growing competitiveness in the Rugby Championship with a strong showing in the 2015 World Cup, reaching the semi-finals for the second time. Argentina opened the tournament with a close fought match against favourites New Zealand, leading 13–12 at half time before eventually conceding two second half tries to lose 26–16. They followed this with a string of convincing wins against Georgia, Tonga and Namibia to qualify for the quarterfinals. A feature of Argentina's rugby in the 2015 World Cup was their free-flowing, entertaining and attacking style of play which resulted in them scoring 22 tries in pool play.

In the quarter-final against Ireland, Argentina scored two tries in the opening 10 minutes to jump out to an early 17–0 lead. Ireland regrouped and scored two tries of their own either side of half time to narrow the gap to 20-17 early in the second half. However, Argentina rallied in the late stages of the match, running in late tries by Juan Imhoff and Joaquín Tuculet to eventually finish with a convincing 43–20 win. As a result, they advanced to their second semi-final against Australia.

The situation was reversed in the semi-final, when Argentina conceded 2 tries in the opening 10 minutes as Australia gained a 19–6 lead after 30 minutes. Argentina dominated the territory and possession of the remainder of the match, gaining a number of penalties at the scrum to gradually reduce Australia's lead. The match was finely balanced with Australia leading 22-15 after 70 minutes, when Australian winger Drew Mitchell produced a match winning run, beating 4 Argentinian tacklers before passing to Adam Ashley-Cooper to score the winning try. The match finished with Australia winning a fast-paced and entertaining clash 29–15.
