= 1958 South American Rugby Championship =

2° Sudamericano de Rugby
Tournament details
- Host: Chile
- Date: 11–18 September 1958
- Countries: Argentina; Chile; Peru; Uruguay

Final positions
- Champions: Argentina
- Runner-up: Chile

Tournament statistics
- Matches played: 6

The 1958 South American Rugby Championship was the second edition of the two tiered competition of the leading national rugby union teams in South America. The tournament was arranged seven years after the Torneo Internacional played in 1951, and was later recognized as the first edition of this competition.

The tournament was played in Chile and won by Argentina.

== Standings ==
| Team | Played | Won | Drawn | Lost | For | Against | Difference | Pts |
|---|---|---|---|---|---|---|---|---|
| Argentina | 3 | 3 | 0 | 0 | 108 | 3 | +105 | 6 |
| Chile | 3 | 2 | 0 | 1 | 65 | 26 | +39 | 4 |
| Uruguay | 3 | 1 | 0 | 2 | 22 | 90 | −68 | 2 |
| Peru | 3 | 0 | 0 | 3 | 9 | 85 | −76 | 0 |

== Results ==
11 September 1958

| Chile | 34–9 | Uruguay |

Club Stade Francaise, Santiago

11 September 1958

| Argentina | 44–0 | Peru |

Club Stade Francaise, Santiago

15 September 1958

| Chile | 31–3 | Peru |

Estadio Sausalito, Vina del Mar

15 September 1958

| Argentina | 50–3 | Uruguay |

Estadio Sausalito, Vina del Mar

18 September 1958

| Uruguay | 10–6 | Peru |

Prince of Wales, Santiago

18 September 1958

| Chile | 0–14 | Argentina |

Prince of Wales, Santiago
