= 1999 Argentina rugby union tour of Scotland and Ireland =

Event

- Coach: Alex Willie
Summary
P	W	D	L
Total
4	3	2	1
Test match
2	1	0	1
Opponent
P	W	D	L
Scotland
1	1	0	0
Ireland
1	0	0	1

The 1999 Argentina rugby union tour of Scotland and Ireland was a series of four matches played by the Argentina national rugby union team in August 1999, to prepare the team for the 1999 Rugby World Cup

== Matches ==
Scores and results list Argentina's points tally first.

Opposing Team	For	Against	Date	Venue	Status
Scotland A	25	25	17 August 1999	Perth	Tour Match
Scotland	31	22	21 August 1999	Murrayfield, Edinburgh	Test Match
Leinster	51	22	24 August 1999	Dublin	Tour Match
Ireland	24	32	28 August 1999	Lansdowne Road, Dublin	Test Match

== Sources ==
- Union Argentina de Rugby (January 2000). "MEMORIA Temporada año 1999" (.doc) (in Spanish).
