= Reginald Cooper =

Argentine rugby union player

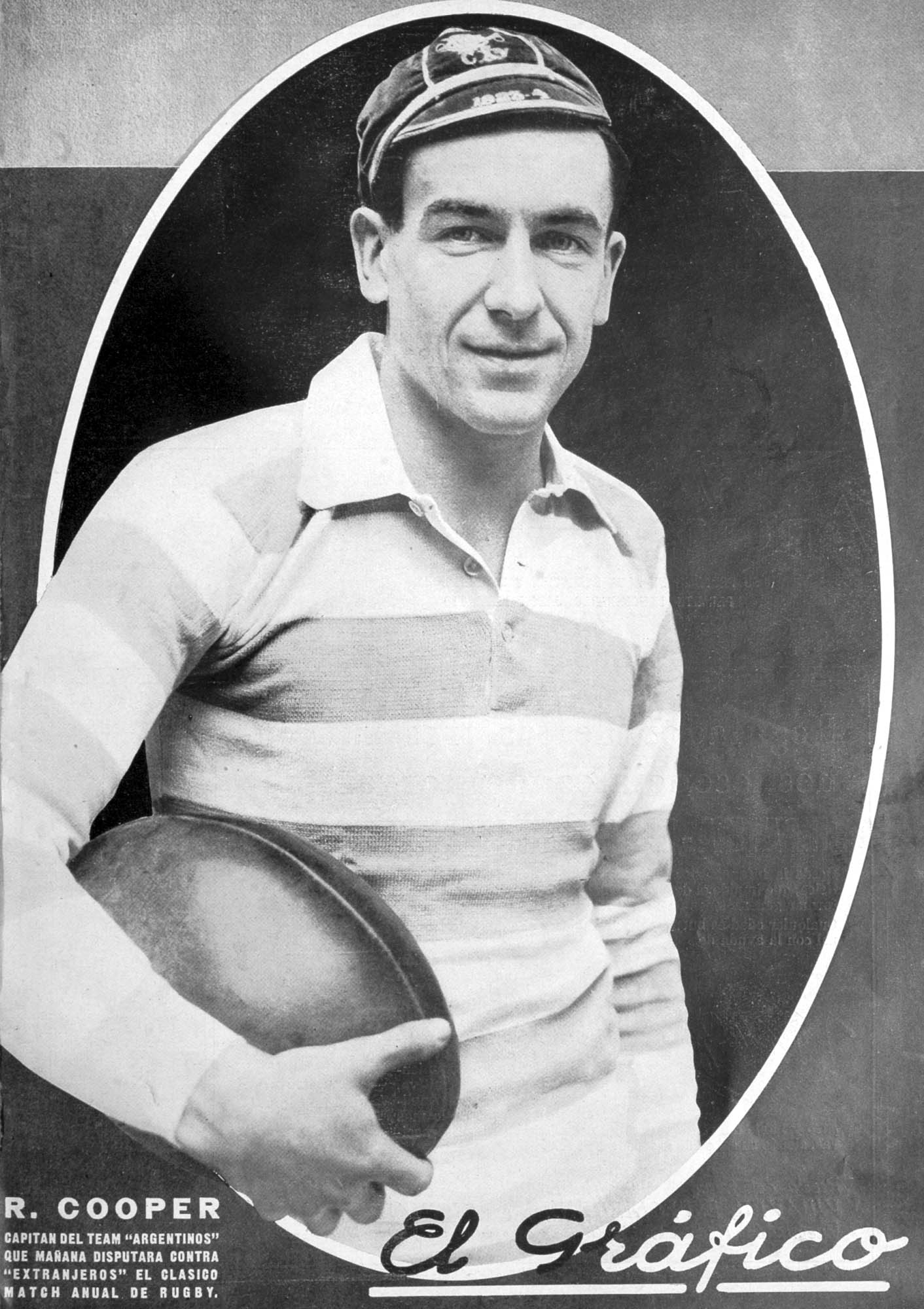
- Cooper with Argentina in 1928
- Born: c. 1900 Buenos Aires
- Died: Buenos Aires

Rugby union career
Amateur team(s)
Years	Team	Apps	(Points)
- Buenos Aires CRC
International career
Years	Team	Apps	(Points)
1927-1930	Argentina		

Reginald Cooper was an Argentine rugby union footballer, who played as scrum-half for the Buenos Aires F.C., and the Argentina national team.

== Career ==
Cooper began his career in the Buenos Aires F.C. He made his international debut with Argentina in a test match against the British Lions in 1927, when the team toured on Argentina for second time.

In 1928 Cooper was the appointed captain of Argentina by his coach Antonio Bilbao La Vieja.
