= Estadio Arquitecto Ricardo Etcheverri =

Football stadium in Buenos Aires, Argentina

Coordinates: 34.6185°S 58.4476°W

Architect Ricardo Etcheverri Stadium
- Estadio Arquitecto Ricardo Etcheverri
- Estadio Ferro Carril Oeste
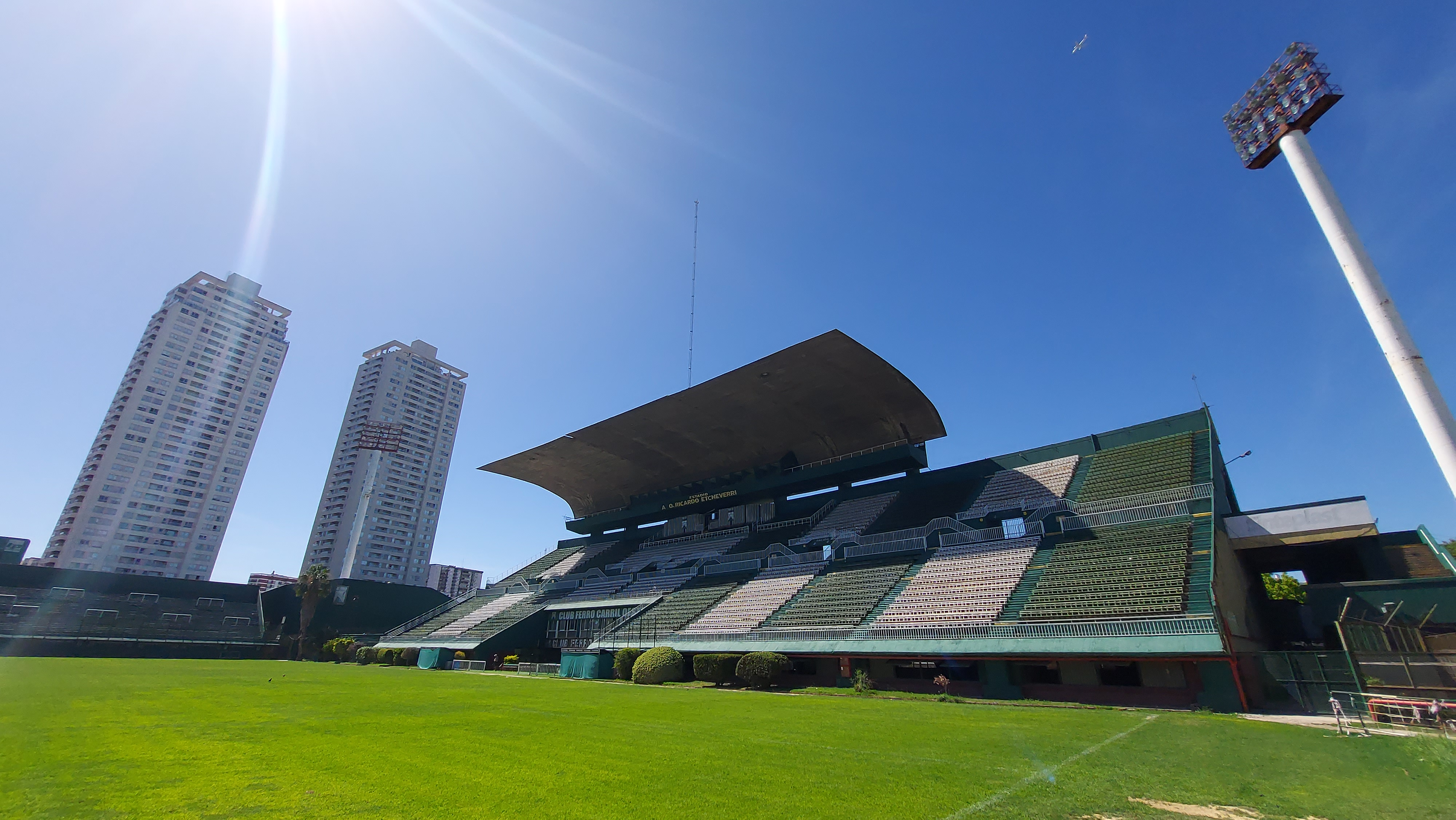
- The stadium pictured in 2023, with the Caballito Nuevo towers in the background
- Interactive map of Architect Ricardo Etcheverri Stadium
- Full name: Estadio Arquitecto Ricardo Etcheverri
- Former names: Estadio Ferro Carril Oeste
- Address: Avellaneda 1240
- Location: Caballito, Buenos Aires; Argentina
- Capacity: 24,442
- Events: Sporting events Concerts
- Surface: Grass
- Public transit: Sarmiento Line at Caballito railway station at Puan (0.9 km away)

Construction
- Opened: 2 January 1905; 121 years ago

Tenant
- List: Football: Ferro Carril Oeste (1905–present); Argentinos Juniors (1983–2003) Rugby: Argentina national rugby team (1932, 1970–2001); C.A. San Isidro (1932) (Note: Only used the venue during their matches v foreign national teams that were touring Argentina.); Universitario (BA) (1932); San Isidro Club (1972–81); URBA provincial team (1972–1994); Torneo de la URBA final (2007)

Website
- ferrocarriloeste.org.ar/estadio

Estadio Arquitecto Ricardo Etcheverri, formerly known as Estadio Ferro Carril Oeste or simply "Ferro", is a football stadium located in the Caballito district of Buenos Aires. It is owned and operated by club Ferro Carril Oeste. The stadium, opened in 1905 and located close to Caballito station of Sarmiento Line, has a current capacity of 24,442.

Inaugurated on 2 January 1905, Ferro Carril Oeste is the oldest football stadium of Argentina (referring to clubs affiliated to AFA) and the second in South America after Estadio Gran Parque Central (home venue of Uruguayan Club Nacional de Football, built in 1900).

Because of being located near the geographic centre of Buenos Aires, several former clubs used it as their home venues. Some of them were Alumni, Barracas A.C., San Lorenzo, Argentinos Juniors, among others.

The stadium also hosted test matches played by the Argentina national rugby union team (Los Pumas) first in 1932 and then during the 1970s to early 2000s, where Argentina played Ireland, New Zealand, France and Australia, among others. In Ferro Carril Oeste, Argentina achieved notable wins over Australia (1979) and France (1985), and a celebrated 21–21 tie vs the All Blacks in 1985. Other local teams such as the URBA team or San Isidro Club played matches at Ferro Carril Oeste in the 1980s.

== History ==
The stadium was built on a land granted by the manager of Buenos Aires Western Railway in 1905. That same year the first wooden grandstand was built. The first official match was played here on 21 April 1907, when Ferro C. Oeste and River Plate tied 2–2. In 1906, the first official grandstand (with roof) was built. Due to being linked with the Western Railway company, the club hosted several sports activities in 1907 to celebrate the 50th. anniversary of first railway line in Argentina.

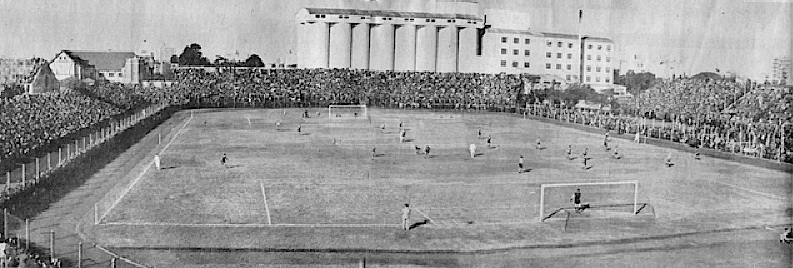
The stadium during a football match, c. 1940. The grandstand at background had been acquired to Club Boca Juniors some years earlier

The first notable event hosted by the stadium was the 1907 Tie Cup Final where Alumni defeated Uruguayan side CURCC 3–1. As Alumni did not have own venue, the team played its home matches at Ferro C. Oeste between 1907 and 1909. In 1914, Ferro hosted a Tie Cup final again, when River Plate beat Bristol and won their first international title. Although Ferro C. Oeste played in the Second Division, its stadium was a frequent venue for several Primera División matches by other teams.

When the Flores Athletic Club disbanded in 1907, Ferro Carril Oeste acquired some of its facilities such as tennis and paleta courts. In September 1931, the official grandstand was completely destroyed by fire, but was rebuilt. During the 1930s, the club got materials in change for football players. Some transfers made that way were Federici to Huracán and Arcadio López to Boca Juniors. In this case, the club received a whole wooden grandstand that had been part of the old Boca Juniors stadium. Two years later, Boca Juniors opened La Bombonera, made of concrete. The wooden grandstand was located on Martín de Gainza street.

The Ferro Carril Oeste stadium hosted international rugby matches for the first time in 1932, when the Junior Springboks toured on Argentina playing several games there including two test-matches v the Argentina national team.

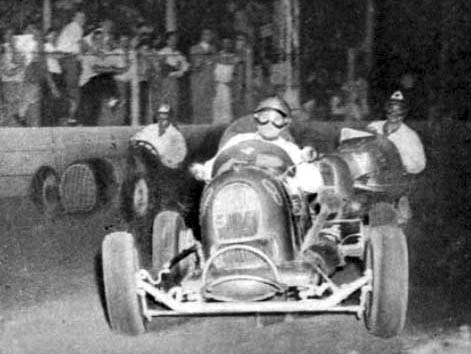
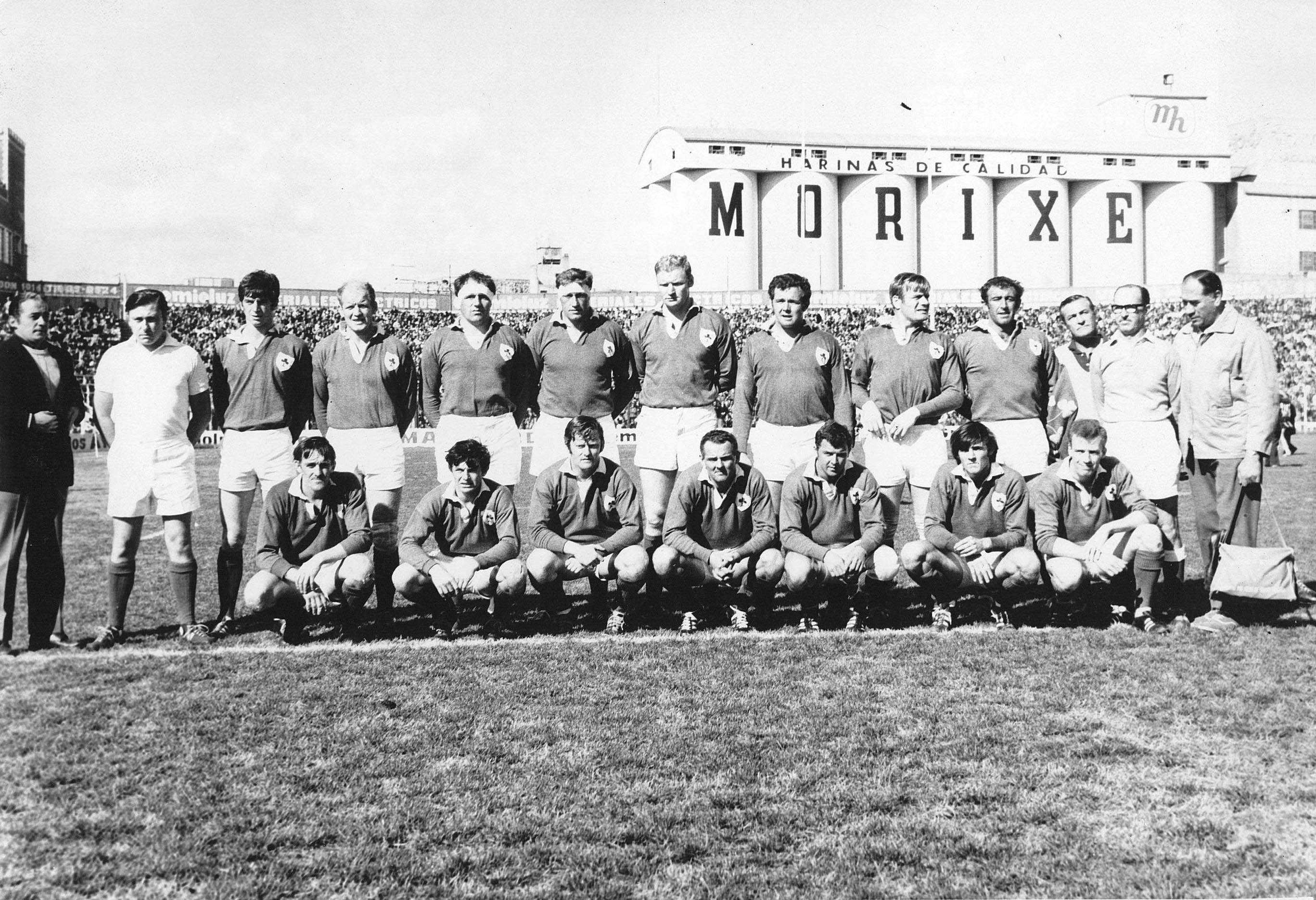
Sports events at Ferro Carril Oeste, (left): midget car racing in 1952; (right): rugby union, Ireland national team posing in 1970

From the 1940s to the 1960s, Ferro Carril Oeste hosted several racing events that include midget car and motorcycle races. Those events were scheduled on Saturdays so football matches were on Sundays, taking place on the racetrack surrounding the football pitch.

In 1951 Ferro Carril Oeste was one of the venues (along with Gimnasia y Esgrima) to host the South American Rugby Championship in Buenos Aires. In 1970, the club built a gymnasium under the official grandstand, which was inaugurated in 1972.

Apart from football games, Ferro C.O. would be the home venue for Los Pumas matches until 1985, when New Zealand toured in the country. The last test played by Argentina at the stadium was the historic 21–21 v the All Blacks in November, when captain Hugo Porta scored all the points for Argentina. He would be named "the best fly-half of the world" at the end of that year.

During the 1990s, the stadium returned to host rugby matches of Los Pumas, along with José Amalfitani Stadium. The last test played by the national team at Ferro was in 2001, when Argentina defeated Italy.

In August 2025, Ferro Carril Oeste inaugurated a rebuilt grandstand (named "West stand"), which was rebuilt after it had collapsed two years before. Six people were injured in the accident.

The stadium was again host of a rugby match in 2007, when Hindú defeated Alumni 9–6 in the Torneo de la URBA final to win their 4th. league title.

== Concerts ==
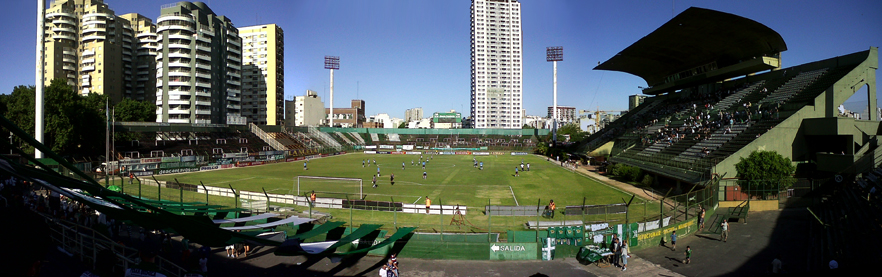
View of the stadium in 2010

Since the 1980s the Estadio Ferro Carril Oeste has hosted a large amount of artists performing there, mostly rock bands.

Local rockstar Charly García gave his first concert as soloist there in 1982, with an attendance of 25,000 people.

The first international artist to have performed at Ferro was British band The Cure in 1987, in a chaotic concert that finished in a riot where hooligans and policemen fight inside and outside the stadium. During the following years, several artists performed in the stadium, having hosted three editions of the Monsters of Rock metal festival, in 1995, 1997 and 2005.

Some of the most notable local bands performing at Ferro were Riff, Rata Blanca, Soda Stereo and Los Fabulosos Cadillacs.

Concerts hosted at Estadio Ferro Carril Oeste
Artist	Date	Tour/Concert	Ref.
Charly García	Dec 1982	Yendo de la Cama al Living	
Riff	Dec 1983, Dec 1997	Sin Cadenas, Monsters of Rock	
Los Violadores	Dec 1983	Sin Cadenas	
The Cure	Mar 1987	Kissing tour	
Iron Maiden	July 1992, 2008	Fear of the Dark Tour and Somewhere Back in Time World Tour	
Pantera	Abr 1995		
Roxette	Abr 1995	Crash! Boom! Bang! Tour	
Faith No More	Sep 1995	Monsters of Rock	
Ozzy Osbourne	Sep 1995	Monsters of Rock	
Alice Cooper	Sep 1995	Monsters of Rock	
Paradise Lost	Sep 1995	Monsters of Rock	
Therapy?	Sep 1995	Monsters of Rock	
Clawfinger	Sep 1995	Monsters of Rock	
Rata Blanca	Sep 1995, Oct 2004, Sep 2005	Monsters of Rock	
Jimmy Page & Robert Plant	Jan 1996	No Quarter	
The Black Crowes	Jan 1996	No Quarter	
Soda Stereo	Nov 1996	Alternative Festival	
Marilyn Manson	Nov 1996	Alternative Festival	
Nick Cave and the Bad Seeds	Nov 1996	Alternative Festival	
Porno for Pyros	Nov 1996	Alternative Festival	
Cypress Hill	Nov 1996	Alternative Festival	
Los Fabulosos Cadillacs	Nov 1996	Alternative Festival	
Spacehog	Nov 1996	Alternative Festival	
Silverchair	Nov 1996	Alternative Festival	
Tracy Bonham	Nov 1996	Alternative Festival	
David Bowie	Nov 1997	Earthling Tour	
Bush	Nov 1997		
No Doubt	Nov 1997	Tragic Kingdom World Tour	
Molotov	Nov 1997	Despedazado Tour	
Café Tacuba	Nov 1997		
Whitesnake	Dec 1997, Sep 2005	Monsters of Rock	
Megadeth	Dec 1997	Monsters of Rock	
Queensrÿche	Dec 1997	Monsters of Rock	
The Offspring	Oct 2004	Quilmes Rock	
Judas Priest	Sep 2005	Monsters of Rock	
Lorihen	Sep 2005	Monsters of Rock	
Pearl Jam	Nov 2005		
Mudhoney	Nov 2005		
My Chemical Romance	Feb 2008	The Black Parade	
Jamiroquai	Feb 2013		
Jonas Brothers	Mar 2013	World Tour 2012–13	
Guns N' Roses	Abr 2014	Appetite for Democracy	

== Notes ==
Preceded by (none)	South American Rugby; Championship; 1951	Succeeded by (various)
