= 1951 South American Rugby Championship =

South American Rugby Championship
- Date: 9–16 September 1951
- Countries: Argentina; Brazil; Chile; Uruguay

Final positions
- Champions: Argentina (1st title)
- Runner-up: Uruguay

Tournament statistics
- Matches played: 6

The 1951 South American Rugby Championship was the first edition of the two tiered competition of the leading national rugby union teams in South America.

The tournament was arranged by the River Plate Rugby Union (currently "Argentine Rugby Union"). In February 1951 a match was organized in Buenos Aires, the first edition of Pan American Games, but it was not possible to arrange a tournament of rugby for those games, so a "Torneo Internacional" was arranged in September. Originally this competition was called Torneo Internacional ABCU, using the initials of the countries participating

After the 1958 edition, this tournament was recognized as the first edition of the competition.

== Standings ==
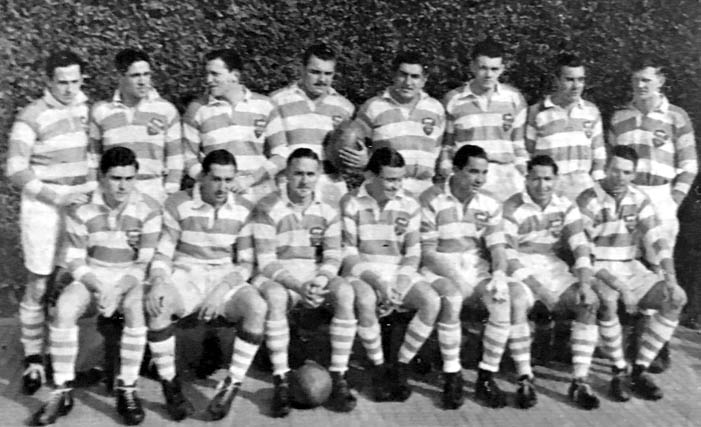
The Argentine side that won the tournament

Team	Played	Won	Drawn	Lost	For	Against	Difference	Pts
Argentina	3	3	0	0	147	3	+144	6
Uruguay	3	2	0	1	25	75	−50	4
Chile	3	1	0	2	74	21	+53	2
Brazil	3	0	0	3	10	157	−147	0

== Results ==
Complete list of matches:

9 September 1951

Argentina	62–0	Uruguay

Estadio GEBA, Buenos Aires

9 September 1951

Brazil	0–68	Chile

Ferrocarril Oeste, Buenos Aires

13 September 1951

Argentina	72–0	Brazil

Estadio GEBA, Buenos Aires

13 September 1951

Chile	3–8	Uruguay

Ferrocarril Oeste, Buenos Aires

16 September 1951

Argentina	13–3	Chile

Estadio GEBA, Buenos Aires

16 September 1951

Brazil	10–17	Uruguay

Ferrocarril Oeste, Buenos Aires
