= 1932 Junior Springboks tour in Argentina =

Summary
P	W	D	L
Total
8	8	0	8
Test match
2	2	0	0
Opponent
P	W	D	L
Argentina
1	1	0	0

The 1932 South Africa Juniors tour of Argentina was a collection of friendly rugby union games undertaken by Junior Springboks, the second South Africa national rugby union team against Argentine clubs and selections. That tour was the first of the Junior Springboks, who had formed one year before.

During their tour on Argentina, the Boks stayed at Belgrano Athletic Club. They played their last match v Gimnasia y Esgrima (BA), the Argentine league champion. After the match, captain J. Nykamp praised the performance of the team, stating that "Gimnasia y Esgrima did not give us a moment of truce and we had to appeal to all our resources to impose."

This tour started a long relationship between the two federations.

== Results ==
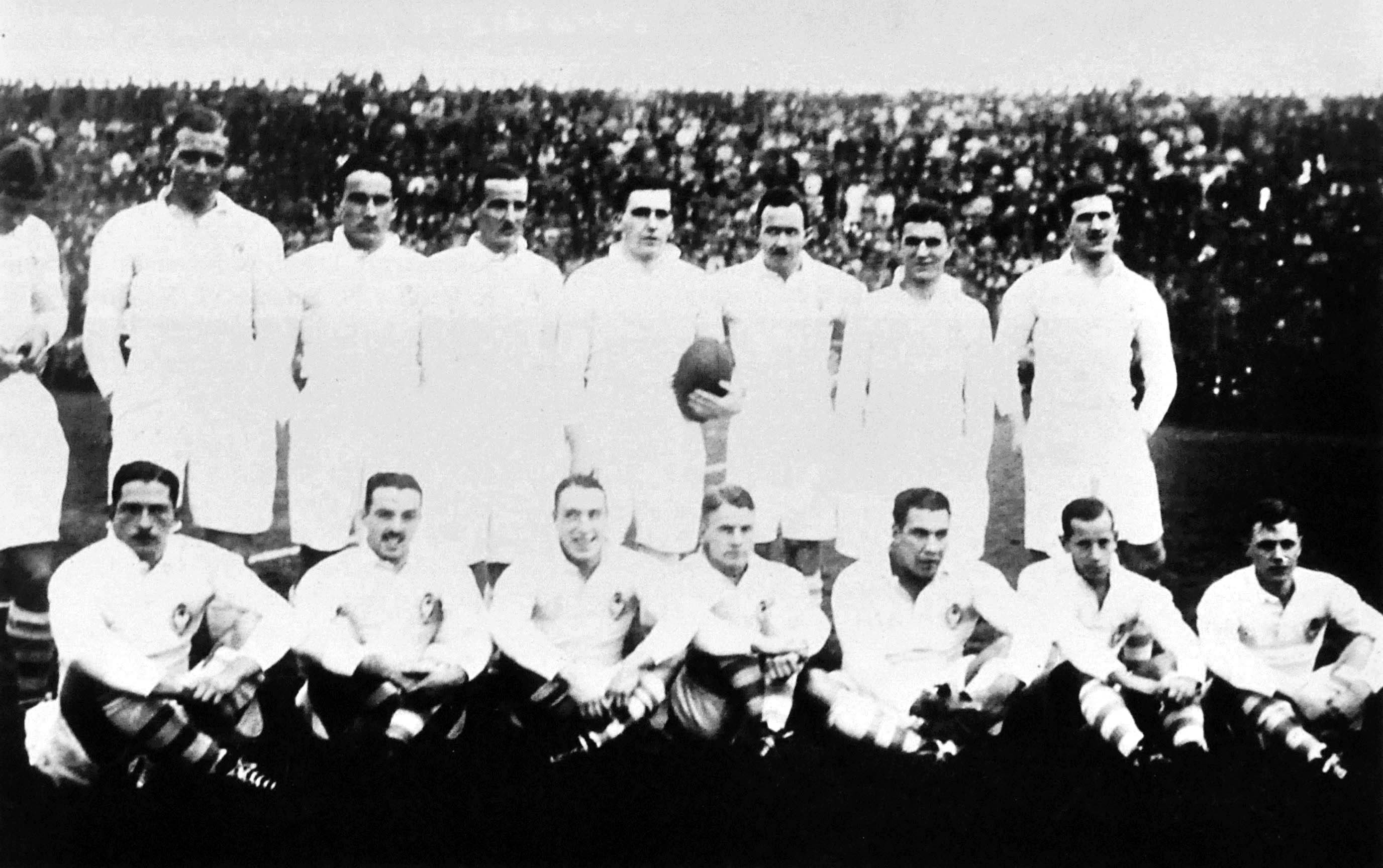
Team of Argentina that played the first test v the Junior Springboks on 16 July

Date	Rival	Res.	Score	Venue	City
9 Jul	Clubes Argentinos	W	18–5	Ferro Carril Oeste	Buenos Aires
15 Jul	Clubes Extranjeros	W	35–8	Ferro Carril Oeste	Buenos Aires
16 Jul	Argentina	W	42–0	Ferro Carril Oeste	Buenos Aires
20 Jul	Universitario (BA)	W	30–0	Ferro Carril Oeste	Buenos Aires
23 Jul	Argentina	W	34–3	Ferro Carril Oeste	Buenos Aires
28 Jul	Litoral Argentino	W	53–3	Plaza Jewell	Rosario
30 Jul	C.A. San Isidro	W	44–0	Ferro Carril Oeste	Buenos Aires
3 Aug	Gimnasia y Esgrima (BA)	W	11–5	Ferro Carril Oeste	Buenos Aires

The tour ended with a match between two mixed teams of South African and Argentine players.
