= 1996 Argentina rugby union tour of England =

- Coach: J L Imhoff
- Tour captain: L Arbizu
Summary
P	W	D	L
Total
7	5	0	2
Test match
1	0	0	1
Opponent
P	W	D	L
England
1	0	0	1

The 1996 Argentina rugby union tour of England was a series of seven matches played by the Argentina national rugby union team in November and December 1996.

== Matches ==
Scores and results list Argentina's points tally first.

Opponent	For	Against	Date	Venue	Status
London and South East	63	20	20 November 1996	Twickenham, London	Tour match
South West Division	25	17	24 November 1996	Recreation Ground, Redruth	Tour match
Midlands Division	90	24	27 November 1996	Sixfields, Northampton	Tour match
Northern Division	64	16	1/12/1996	Mc Alpine Stadium, Huddersfield	Tour match
Combined Services	52	6	4/12/1996	Rectory Field, Devonport	Tour match
England A	17	22	10/12/1996	Franklin Gardens, Northampton	Tour match
England	18	20	14 December 1996	Twickenham, London	Test match
