= 2015 in rugby union =

Here are the match results of the 2015 Rugby union season. The main tournament for the year was the 2015 Rugby World Cup which was held at England this year.

== International tournaments ==
=== Worldwide ===
- October 17, 2014 – May 2, 2015: 2014–15 European Rugby Champions Cup
- February 6 – March 21: 2015 Six Nations Championship
- February 12 – July 4: 2015 Super Rugby season
- March 9 – 23: 2015 World Rugby Pacific Challenge
- May 12 – 24: 2015 World Rugby Under 20 Trophy in Portugal
- June 2 – 20: 2015 World Rugby Under 20 Championship in Italy
- July 17 – August 8: 2015 Rugby Championship
- July 18 – August 3: 2015 World Rugby Pacific Nations Cup
- September 18 – October 31: 2015 Rugby World Cup in England

== International results ==
Complete list of fixtures involving national teams during 2015.

=== February ===
Date	Match	Venue	Result	Source
6 February	Wales – England	Millennium Stadium, Cardiff	16–21	
7 February	Italy – Ireland	Stadio Olimpico, Rome	3–26	
7 February	France – Scotland	Stade de France, Saint-Denis	15–8	
7 February	Portugal – Romania	Estádio Universitário de Lisboa, Lisbon	10–37	
7 February	Spain – Russia	Estadio Nacional Complutense, Madrid	43–18	
7 February	Germany – (Georgia (country)) Georgia	Sportpark Martinsee, Heusenstamm	8–64	
14 February	England – Italy	Twickenham Stadium, London	47–17	
14 February	Ireland – France	Aviva Stadium, Dublin	18–11	
14 February	(Georgia (country)) Georgia – Portugal	Mikheil Meskhi Stadium, Tbilisi	20–15	
14 February	Romania – Spain	Cluj Arena, Cluj-Napoca	29–8	
14 February	Germany – Russia	Pforzheim	22–46	
15 February	Scotland – Wales	Murrayfield Stadium, Edinburgh	23–26	
21 February	Netherlands – Belgium	National Rugby Centre Amsterdam, Amsterdam	21–23	
28 February	France – Wales	Stade de France, Saint-Denis	13–20	
28 February	Scotland – Italy	Murrayfield Stadium, Edinburgh	19–22	
28 February	Spain – (Georgia (country)) Georgia	Estadio Nacional Complutense, Madrid	13–26	
28 February	Russia – Romania	Stadion Trud, Krasnodar	16–13	
28 February	Portugal – Germany	Estádio Universitário de Lisboa, Lisbon	8–3	
28 February	Netherlands – Moldova	National Rugby Centre Amsterdam, Amsterdam	18–10	
28 February	Saint Lucia – British Virgin Islands	Mindoo Phillip Park, Castries	14–22	

=== March ===
Date	Match	Venue	Result	Source
1 March	Ireland – England	Aviva Stadium, Dublin	19–9	
7 March	Mexico – (United States) USA South	Estadio Roberto "Tapatio" Mendez, Mexico City	50–25	
7 March	Guyana – Barbados	Providence National Stadium, Georgetown	48–22	
7 March	Bermuda – Turks and Caicos Islands	National Sports Centre, Hamilton	56–3	
7 March	Curaçao – (Saint Vincent and the Grenadines) Saint Vincent & Grenadines	CH Mahuma Field, Willemstad	24–24	
14 March	Wales – Ireland	Millennium Stadium, Cardiff	23–16	
14 March	England – Scotland	Twickenham Stadium, London	25–13	
14 March	(Georgia (country)) Georgia – Russia	Mikheil Meskhi Stadium, Tbilisi	33–0	
14 March	Portugal – Spain	Estádio Municipal Sérgio Conceição, Coimbra	8–19	
14 March	Germany – Romania	Fritz-Grunebaum-Sportpark, Heidelberg	12–17	
14 March	Belgium – Moldova	Brussels	17–14	
14 March	Senegal – Ivory Coast	Toulouse	20–14	
15 March	Italy – France	Stadio Olimpico, Rome	0–29	
21 March	Italy – Wales	Stadio Olimpico, Rome	20–61	
21 March	Scotland – Ireland	Murrayfield Stadium, Edinburgh	10–40	
21 March	England – France	Twickenham Stadium, London	55–35	
21 March	Romania – (Georgia (country)) Georgia	Stadionul Arcul de Triumf, Bucharest	6–15	
21 March	Russia – Portugal	Slava Metreveli Central Stadium, Sochi	21–8	
21 March	Spain – Germany	Estadio Nacional Complutense, Madrid	48–16	
21 March	(United States) USA South – Cayman Islands	Atlanta	24–25	
21 March	Barbados – Trinidad and Tobago	Garrison Savannah, St Michael	7–44	
21 March	(The Bahamas) Bahamas – Bermuda	Winton Rugby Centre, Nassau	21–15	
21 March	Saint Lucia – (Saint Vincent and the Grenadines) Saint Vincent & Grenadines	Castries	8–16	
28 March	Belgium – Sweden	KVW-Zaventem Stadium, Brussels	71–10	
29 March	Hungary – Cyprus	Városi Szabadidő Központ, Százhalombatta	15–17	

=== April ===
Date	Match	Venue	Result	Source
4 April	Andorra – Hungary	Estadi Nacional, Andorra la Vella	23–18	
11 April	Uruguay – Paraguay	Estadio Charrúa, Montevideo	77–3	
11 April	Croatia – Czech Republic	Stadion Lučko, Zagreb	9–12	
11 April	Montenegro – Estonia	Bar	29–27	
11 April	Cayman Islands – Mexico	Truman Bodden Stadium, Grand Cayman	3–24	
11 April	Trinidad and Tobago – Guyana	Port of Spain	22–20	
11 April	Curaçao – Saint Lucia	Bonam Ground, Willemstad	36–19	
14 April	Montenegro – Slovakia	Bar	3–31	
14 April	Lebanon – Jordan	Fouad Shehab Stadium, Jounieh	71–3	
16 April	Iran – Jordan	Fouad Shehab Stadium, Jounieh	49–3	
18 April	South Korea – Japan	Namdong Asiad Rugby Ground, Incheon	30–56	
18 April	Uruguay – Brazil	Estadio Charrúa, Montevideo	48–9	
18 April	Belgium – Poland	Brussels	53–23	
18 April	Israel – Malta	Wingate Institute, Netanya	13–16	
18 April	Switzerland – Croatia	Stade du Verger, Monthey	40–20	
18 April	Serbia – Austria	Belgrade	22–3	
18 April	Slovenia – Luxembourg	Ljubljana	11–14	
18 April	(Saint Vincent and the Grenadines) Saint Vincent & Grenadines – British Virgin Islands	Arnos Vale Stadium, Kingstown	15–22	
18 April	Turks and Caicos Islands – (The Bahamas) Bahamas	Meridian Field, Providenciales	7–24	
18 April	Lebanon – Iran	Fouad Shehab Stadium, Jounieh	27–8	
18 April	Ivory Coast – Mali	Yamoussoukro	49–0	
23 April	Uruguay – United States XV	Montevideo	3–13	
25 April	Hong Kong – South Korea	Hong Kong Football Club Stadium, Hong Kong	26–33	
25 April	Chile – Brazil	Parque Mahuida, Santiago	32–3	
25 April	Trinidad and Tobago – Mexico	St Mary's College Ground, Port of Spain	30–16	
25 April	Malta – Switzerland	Hibernians Ground, Paola	20–23	
25 April	Czech Republic – Israel	RC Sparta Prague, Prague	26–26	
25 April	Lithuania – Latvia	Vingis Park Rugby Stadium, Vilnius	46–11	
25 April	Denmark – Serbia	Odense Atletikstadion, Odense	22–25	
25 April	Austria – Slovenia	Vienna	16–17	
25 April	Bosnia and Herzegovina – Finland	Stadion Kamberovića polje, Zenica	29–7	
25 April	Turkey – Bulgaria	Antalya	28–26	

=== May ===
Date	Match	Venue	Result	Venue source
2 May	Japan – Hong Kong	Prince Chichibu Memorial Stadium, Tokyo	41–0	
2 May	Latvia – Andorra	Daugava Stadium, Riga	5–14	
2 May	Cyprus – Lithuania	Paphos	20–26	
2 May	British Virgin Islands – Curaçao	A. O. Shirley Recreation Ground, Road Town	19–0	
3 May	Paraguay – Chile	Parque Olímpico, Asunción	25–35	
6 May	Sri Lanka – Kazakhstan	Philippines Sports Stadium, Bocaue	35–14	
6 May	Philippines – Singapore	Philippines Sports Stadium, Bocaue	20–17	
9 May	Japan – South Korea	Level-5 Stadium, Fukuoka	66–10	
9 May	Brazil – Paraguay	Estádio das Montanhas, Bento Gonçalves	11–20	
9 May	Chile – Uruguay	Parque Mahuida, Santiago	30–15	
9 May	Poland – Ukraine	Arena Lublin, Lublin	17–20	
9 May	Luxembourg – Denmark	Stade Josy Barthel, Luxembourg	13–5	
9 May	Bosnia and Herzegovina – Norway	Zenica	16–10	
9 May	Philippines – Sri Lanka	Philippines Sports Stadium, Bocaue	14–27	
9 May	Kazakhstan – Singapore	Philippines Sports Stadium, Bocaue	32–12	
10 May	United Arab Emirates – Thailand	Petaling Jaya Stadium, Petaling Jaya	53–22	
10 May	Malaysia – Chinese Taipei	Petaling Jaya Stadium, Petaling Jaya	46–13	
13 May	Chinese Taipei – Thailand	Petaling Jaya Stadium, Petaling Jaya	29–24	
13 May	Malaysia – United Arab Emirates	Petaling Jaya Stadium, Petaling Jaya	20–19	
16 May	South Korea – Hong Kong	Namdong Asiad Rugby Stadium, Incheon	37–38	
16 May	Uruguay – Argentina	Estadio Charrúa, Montevideo	14–36	
16 May	United Arab Emirates – Chinese Taipei	Petaling Jaya Stadium, Petaling Jaya	16–12	
16 May	Malaysia – Thailand	Petaling Jaya Stadium, Petaling Jaya	53–7	
23 May	Paraguay – Argentina	Estadio Héroes de Curupaytí, Asunción	7–71	
23 May	Uruguay – Fiji XV	Estadio Charrúa, Montevideo	22–30	
23 May	Ukraine – Netherlands	Odesa	18–10	
23 May	Finland – Turkey	Helsinki	20–12	
23 May	Norway – Bulgaria	Bergen	43–0	
23 May	Burkina Faso – Benin	Stade de l'USFA, Ouagadougou	65–3	
23 May	Mali – Togo	Stade de l'USFA, Ouagadougou	31–12	
23 May	Niger – Ghana	Stade de l'USFA, Ouagadougou	28–10	
27 May	Uzbekistan – India	Dustlik, Tashkent	8–31	
27 May	Mali – Ghana	Stade de l'USFA, Ouagadougou	24–7	
27 May	Niger – Benin	Stade de l'USFA, Ouagadougou	80–5	
27 May	Burkina Faso – Togo	Stade de l'USFA, Ouagadougou	20–7	
28 May	China – Mongolia	Yantai	46–19	
30 May	Kenya – Portugal	RFUEA Ground, Nairobi	41–15	
30 May	Netherlands – Sweden	National Rugby Centre Amsterdam, Amsterdam	24–14	
30 May	Uzbekistan – India	Dustlik, Tashkent	32–15	
30 May	Burkina Faso – Ghana	Stade de l'USFA, Ouagadougou	12–0	
30 May	Niger – Togo	Stade de l'USFA, Ouagadougou	50–15	
30 May	Mali – Benin	Stade de l'USFA, Ouagadougou	65–5	
31 May	Uruguay – Fiji XV	Estadio Charrúa, Montevideo	22–42	
31 May	England XV – Barbarians (UK) RFC	Twickenham	72–12	

=== June ===
Date	Match	Venue	Result	Venue source
6 June	Tunisia – Namibia	National Stadium, Nabeul, Nabeul	12–24	
6 June	Malaysia – Lebanon	Melaka	10–0	
6 June	Algeria – Kazakhstan	Melaka	26–5	
7 June	Indonesia – Guam	UPH Stadium, Jakarta	6–17	
8 June	Lebanon – Uzbekistan	Melaka	54–0	
10 June	Guam – China	UPH Stadium, Jakarta	34–17	
10 June	Algeria – Kazakhstan	Melaka	15–0	
11 June	Malaysia – Uzbekistan	Melaka	55–9	
12 June	Argentina XV – Namibia	Stadionul National Arcul de Triumf, Bucharest	30–10	
12 June	Romania – Spain	Stadionul National Arcul de Triumf, Bucharest	35–9	
13 June	(Georgia (country)) Georgia – Uruguay	Avchala Stadium, Tbilisi	19–10	
13 June	Emerging Ireland – Emerging Italy	Avchala Stadium, Tbilisi	25–0	
13 June	Zimbabwe – Kenya	Jubilee Field, Harare	28–20	
13 June	Kenya 'A' – Uganda	RFUEA Ground, Nairobi	20–17	
13 June	Indonesia – China	UPH Stadium, Jakarta	21–47	
14 June	Kazakhstan – Lebanon	Melaka	35–22	
14 June	Malaysia – Algeria	Melaka	19–11	
17 June	Argentina XV – Spain	Stadionul National Arcul de Triumf, Bucharest	15–6	
17 June	Romania – Namibia	Stadionul National Arcul de Triumf, Bucharest	43–3	
17 June	Emerging Ireland – Uruguay	Avchala Stadium, Tbilisi	33–7	
17 June	(Georgia (country)) Georgia – Emerging Italy	Avchala Stadium, Tbilisi	10–26	
20 June	Argentina – (France) French Barbarians	Old Resian Club, Rosario	20–28	
20 June	Uganda – Kenya 'A'	Kampala	30–25	
20 June	Mauritius – Réunion	Curepipe	39–10	
21 June	Spain – Namibia	Stadionul National Arcul de Triumf, Bucharest	20–3	
21 June	Romania – Argentina XV	Stadionul National Arcul de Triumf, Bucharest	23–0	
21 June	Emerging Ireland – Uruguay	Avchala Stadium, Tbilisi	23–13	
21 June	(Georgia (country)) Georgia – Emerging Ireland	Avchala Stadium, Tbilisi	12–45	
21 June	Zambia – Nigeria	Lusaka	15–8	
24 June	Nigeria – Zimbabwe 'A'	Lusaka	34–23	
26 June	Argentina – (France) French Barbarians	La Plata Rugby Club, La Plata	21–9	
27 June	Zambia – Zimbabwe 'A'	Lusaka	19–12	
28 June	Kenya – Tunisia	RFUEA Ground, Nairobi	46–15	
28 June	(Democratic Republic of the Congo) Congo Kinshasa 'B' – Rwanda	Kinshasa	8–18	
30 June	(Democratic Republic of the Congo) Congo Kinshasa – Rwanda	Stade Tata Raphaël, Kinshasa	29–3	

=== July ===
Date	Match	Venue	Result	Venue source
4 July	Zimbabwe – Tunisia	Jubilee Field, Harare	19–8	
4 July	Lesotho – (Eswatini) Swaziland	Maseru	13–10	
5 July	Madagascar – Botswana	Kampala	36–18	
5 July	Uganda – Ivory Coast	Kyadondo Rugby Club, Kampala	40–11	
5 July	Senegal – Mauritius	Kampala	42–3	
8 July	Samoa – New Zealand	Apia Park, Apia	16–25	
8 July	Uganda – Mauritius	Legends Rugby Grounds, Kampala	35–11	
8 July	Botswana – Senegal	Legends Rugby Grounds, Kampala	26–21	
8 July	Madagascar – Ivory Coast	Legends Rugby Grounds, Kampala	30–26	
11 July	South Africa – World XV	Newlands Stadium, Cape Town	46–10	
11 July	Fiji – (Māori people) Māori All Blacks	ANZ National Stadium, Suva	26–27	
11 July	Namibia – Russia	Hage Geingob Rugby Stadium, Windhoek	39–19	
11 July	Madagascar – Mauritius	Kampala	33–24	
11 July	Uganda – Botswana	Kyadondo Rugby Club, Kampala	59–10	
11 July	Ivory Coast – Senegal	Kyadondo Rugby Club, Kampala	22–19	
17 July	New Zealand – Argentina	AMI Stadium, Christchurch	39–18	
18 July	Australia – South Africa	Suncorp Stadium, Brisbane	24–20	
18 July	Fiji – Tonga	ANZ National Stadium, Suva	30–22	
18 July	Japan – Canada	Avaya Stadium, San Jose	20–6	
18 July	United States – Samoa	Avaya Stadium, San Jose	16–21	
18 July	Namibia – Russia	Hage Geingob Rugby Stadium, Windhoek	43–5	
18 July	Kenya – Spain	RFUEA Ground, Nairobi	36–27	
24 July	Canada – Tonga	Swangard Stadium, Burnaby	18–28	
24 July	Fiji – Samoa	Bonney Field, Sacramento	30–30	
24 July	United States – Japan	Bonney Field, Sacramento	23–18	
25 July	South Africa – New Zealand	Ellis Park Stadium, Johannesburg	20–27	
25 July	Argentina – Australia	Estadio Malvinas Argentinas, Mendoza	9–34	
29 July	Tonga – United States	BMO Field, Toronto	33–19	
29 July	Fiji – Japan	BMO Field, Toronto	27–22	
29 July	Canada – Samoa	BMO Field, Toronto	20–21	

=== August ===
Date	Match	Venue	Result	Venue source
1 August	Uruguay – Argentina XV	Estadio Charrúa, Montevideo	30–26	
3 August	Fiji – Samoa	Swangard Stadium, Burnaby	39–29	
3 August	Tonga – Japan	Swangard Stadium, Burnaby	31–20	
3 August	Canada – United States	Swangard Stadium, Burnaby	13–15	
8 August	Wales – Ireland	Millennium Stadium, Cardiff	21–35	
8 August	Australia – New Zealand	Stadium Australia, Sydney	27–19	
8 August	South Africa – Argentina	Kings Park Stadium, Durban	25–37	
8 August	Namibia – Kenya	Hage Geingob Rugby Stadium, Windhoek	46–13	
15 August	Argentina – South Africa	José Amalfitani Stadium, Buenos Aires	12–26	
15 August	England – France	Twickenham Stadium, London	19–14	
15 August	Ireland – Scotland	Aviva Stadium, Dublin	28–22	
15 August	New Zealand – Australia	Eden Park, Auckland	41–13	
15 August	Japan – World XV	Prince Chichibu Memorial Rugby Stadium, Tokyo	20–45	
15 August	Namibia – Zimbabwe	Hage Geingob Rugby Stadium, Windhoek	80–6	
22 August	France – England	Stade de France, Saint-Denis	25–20	
22 August	Italy – Scotland	Stadio Olimpico di Torino, Turin	12–16	
22 August	Japan – Uruguay	Best Denki Stadium, Higashiosaka	30–8	
22 August	Canada – United States	Twin Elm Rugby Park, Ottawa	23–41	
22 August	American Samoa – Solomon Islands	Sir Hubert Murray Stadium, Port Moresby	30–15	
22 August	Papua New Guinea – (French Polynesia) Tahiti	Sir Hubert Murray Stadium, Port Moresby	32–10	
26 August	(French Polynesia) Tahiti – Solomon Islands	Sir Hubert Murray Stadium, Port Moresby	36–12	
26 August	Papua New Guinea – American Samoa	Sir Hubert Murray Stadium, Port Moresby	36–22	
29 August	Ireland – Wales	Aviva Stadium, Dublin	10–16	
29 August	Scotland – Italy	Murrayfield Stadium, Edinburgh	48–7	
29 August	Japan – Uruguay	Prince Chichibu Memorial Rugby Stadium, Tokyo	40–0	
29 August	Barbarians – Samoa	London Stadium, London	27–24	
30 August	(French Polynesia) Tahiti – American Samoa	Sir Hubert Murray Stadium, Port Moresby	20–8	
30 August	Papua New Guinea – Solomon Islands	Sir Hubert Murray Stadium, Port Moresby	58–19	

=== September ===
Date	Match	Venue	Result	Venue source
2 September	Canada – (Georgia (country)) Georgia	Molesey Road, Walton-on-Thames	16–15	
5 September	France – Scotland	Stade de France, Saint-Denis	19–16	
5 September	England – Ireland	Twickenham Stadium, London	21–13	
5 September	Wales – Italy	Millennium Stadium, Cardiff	23–19	
5 September	United States – Australia	Soldier Field, Chicago	10–47	
5 September	Japan – (Georgia (country)) Georgia	Kingsholm Stadium, Gloucester	13–10	
5 September	Romania – Tonga	Stadionul Național Arcul de Triumf, Bucharest	16–21	
6 September	Fiji – Canada	Twickenham Stoop, London	47–18	
12 September	Sweden – Poland	Enköping	11–29	
18 September	England – Fiji	Twickenham Stadium, London	35–11	
19 September	Japan – South Africa	Falmer Stadium, Brighton	34–32	
19 September	(Georgia (country)) Georgia – Tonga	Kingsholm Stadium, Gloucester	17–10	
19 September	Ireland – Canada	Millennium Stadium, Cardiff	50–7	
19 September	France – Italy	Twickenham Stadium, London	32–10	
20 September	Wales – Uruguay	Millennium Stadium, Cardiff	54–9	
20 September	Samoa – United States	Falmer Stadium, Brighton	25–16	
20 September	New Zealand – Argentina	Wembley Stadium, London	26–16	
23 September	Australia – Fiji	Millennium Stadium, Cardiff	28–13	
23 September	Scotland – Japan	Kingsholm Stadium, Gloucester	45–10	
23 September	France – Romania	Olympic Stadium, London	38–11	
24 September	New Zealand – Namibia	Olympic Stadium, London	58–14	
25 September	Argentina – (Georgia (country)) Georgia	Kingsholm Stadium, Gloucester	54–9	
26 September	Wales – England	Twickenham Stadium, London	28–25	
26 September	South Africa – Samoa	Villa Park, Birmingham	46–6	
26 September	Italy – Canada	Elland Road, Leeds	23–18	
26 September	Sweden – Belgium	Enköping	20–41	
27 September	Australia – Uruguay	Villa Park, Birmingham	65–3	
27 September	Scotland – United States	Elland Road, Leeds	39–16	
27 September	Ireland – Romania	Wembley Stadium, London	44–10	
29 September	Tonga – Namibia	Sandy Park, Exeter	35–21	

=== October ===
Date	Match	Venue	Result	Venue source
1 October	Wales – Fiji	Millennium Stadium, Cardiff	23–13	
1 October	France – Canada	Stadium mk, Milton Keynes	41–18	
2 October	New Zealand – (Georgia (country)) Georgia	Millennium Stadium, Cardiff	43–10	
3 October	England – Australia	Twickenham Stadium, London	13–33	
3 October	Samoa – Japan	Stadium mk, Milton Keynes	5–26	
3 October	South Africa – Scotland	St James' Park, Newcastle upon Tyne	34–16	
3 October	Finland – Bosnia and Herzegovina	Helsinki	6–12	
3 October	Bulgaria – Norway	Burgas	15–16	
4 October	Argentina – Tonga	Leicester City Stadium, Leicester	45–16	
4 October	Ireland – Italy	Olympic Stadium, London	16–9	
6 October	Canada – Romania	Leicester City Stadium, Leicester	15–17	
6 October	Fiji – Uruguay	Stadium mk, Milton Keynes	47–15	
7 October	South Africa – United States	Olympic Stadium, London	64–0	
7 October	Namibia – (Georgia (country)) Georgia	Sandy Park, Exeter	16–17	
9 October	New Zealand – Tonga	St James' Park, Newcastle upon Tyne	47–9	
10 October	Australia – Wales	Twickenham Stadium, London	15–6	
10 October	England – Uruguay	City of Manchester Stadium, Manchester	60–3	
10 October	Samoa – Scotland	St James' Park, Newcastle upon Tyne	33–36	
10 October	Ukraine – Belgium	Kyiv	17–16	
10 October	Denmark – Austria	Odense	25–31	
11 October	United States – Japan	Kingsholm Stadium, Gloucester	18–28	
11 October	Argentina – Namibia	Leicester City Stadium, Leicester	64–19	
11 October	Italy – Romania	Sandy Park, Exeter	32–22	
11 October	France – Ireland	Millennium Stadium, Cardiff	9–24	
17 October	South Africa – Wales	Twickenham Stadium, London	23–19	
17 October	New Zealand – France	Millennium Stadium, Cardiff	62–13	
17 October	Ukraine – Poland	Khmelnytskyi	30–14	
17 October	Bosnia and Herzegovina – Turkey	Kamberovića Polje, Zenica	24–21	
17 October	Malta – Gibraltar	Marsa Sports Club, Marsa	14–29	
18 October	Ireland – Argentina	Millennium Stadium, Cardiff	20–43	
18 October	Australia – Scotland	Twickenham Stadium, London	35–34	
24 October	Czech Republic – Switzerland	Stadion Vyškov, Vyškov	14–20	
24 October	Hungary – Lithuania	Esztergom	15–37	
24 October	Austria – Luxembourg	Vienna	6–34	
24 October	Bulgaria – Finland	Vasil Levski National Stadium, Sofia	34–15	
24 October	Ghana – Togo	Accra Sports Stadium, Accra	17–0	
25 October	Australia – Argentina	Twickenham Stadium, London	29–15	
30 October	South Africa – Argentina	Olympic Stadium, London	24–13	
31 October	New Zealand – Australia	Twickenham Stadium, London	34–17	
31 October	Lithuania – Andorra	Vingis Park Rugby Stadium, Vilnius	49–17	
31 October	Latvia – Hungary	Daugava Stadium, Riga	39–10	

=== November ===
Date	Match	Venue	Result	Venue source
7 November	Sweden – Moldova	Lindängens, Malmö	7–25	
7 November	Israel – Croatia	Wingate Institute, Netanya	21–26	
7 November	Cyprus – Latvia	Pafiako Stadium, Paphos	3–31	
7 November	Serbia – Slovenia	Belgrade	17–33	
7 November	British Virgin Islands – Barbados	A. O. Shirley Stadium, Road Town, Tortola	15–17	
7 November	Costa Rica – Panama	Liceo Franco Costarricense, San José	72–25	
8 November	Colombia – Ecuador	Newton College, Lima	77–13	
8 November	Peru – Venezuela	Newton College, Lima	24–10	
11 November	Colombia – Venezuela	Newton College, Lima	33–5	
11 November	Peru – Ecuador	Newton College, Lima	30–0	
13 November	Portugal – Russia	Hong Kong Football Club Ground, Hong Kong	12–23	
13 November	Hong Kong – Zimbabwe	Hong Kong Football Club Ground, Hong Kong	30–11	
14 November	Poland – Moldova	Polonia Stadium, Warsaw	18–14	
14 November	Switzerland – Israel	Stade de Genève, Geneva	28–3	
14 November	Croatia – Malta	Split	34–27	
14 November	Slovenia – Denmark	Sportni Park Siska, Ljubljana	21–16	
14 November	Luxembourg – Serbia	Luxembourg	30–24	
14 November	Colombia – Peru	Newton College, Lima	28–15	
14 November	Venezuela – Ecuador	Newton College, Lima	42–11	
17 November	Zimbabwe – Russia	Hong Kong Football Club Ground, Hong Kong	5–50	
17 November	Hong Kong – Portugal	Hong Kong Football Club Ground, Hong Kong	13–6	
21 November	Portugal – Zimbabwe	Hong Kong Football Club Ground, Hong Kong	36–11	
21 November	Hong Kong – Russia	Hong Kong Football Club Ground, Hong Kong	12–31	
21 November	Spain – Chile	Torrelavega	54–10	
21 November	Malta – Czech Republic	Hibernians Ground, Paola	13–20	
22 November	Guatemala – El Salvador	Estadio Erick Barrondo, Guatemala City	56–0	
28 November	Germany – Brazil	Blumenau	29–12	
28 November	Andorra – Cyprus	National Stadium, Andorra la Vella	22–13	
28 November	Honduras – Guatemala XV	Estadio Municipal, Las Vegas	7–25	

=== December ===
Date	Match	Venue	Result	Venue source
4 December	Brazil – Germany	Estádio do Pacaembu, São Paulo	7–31	
6 December	Guatemala – Costa Rica	Estadio Nacional Jorge "Mágico" González, San Salvador	19–17	
6 December	El Salvador – Panama	Estadio Nacional Jorge "Mágico" González, San Salvador	32–0	
9 December	Guatemala – Panama	Estadio Nacional Jorge "Mágico" González, San Salvador	73–12	
9 December	El Salvador – Costa Rica	Estadio Nacional Jorge "Mágico" González, San Salvador	14–26	
12 December	Brazil – Colombia	Estádio do Canindé, São Paulo	44–0	
12 December	El Salvador – Guatemala	Estadio Nacional Jorge "Mágico" González, San Salvador	8–26	
12 December	Costa Rica – Panama	Estadio Nacional Jorge "Mágico" González, San Salvador	93–3	
18 December	Algeria – Tunisia	Ahmed Zabana Stadium, Oran	16–6	

== Rugby sevens ==
- October 11, 2014 – May 17, 2015: 2014–15 Sevens World Series
  - October 11 & 12, 2014: 2014 Gold Coast Sevens, in Australia, at the Robina Stadium
    - Cup winner: Fiji
    - Plate winner: New Zealand
    - Bowl winner: United States
    - Shield winner: Canada
  - December 5 & 6, 2014: 2014 Dubai Sevens, in the United Arab Emirates, at The Sevens Stadium
    - Cup winner: South Africa
    - Plate winner: Argentina
    - Bowl winner: Samoa
    - Shield winner: Canada
  - December 13 & 14, 2014: 2014 South Africa Sevens, in Port Elizabeth, at the Nelson Mandela Bay Stadium
    - Cup winner: South Africa
    - Plate winner: United States
    - Bowl winner: Canada
    - Shield winner: Portugal
  - February 6 & 7, 2015: 2015 Wellington Sevens, in New Zealand, at the Wellington Regional Stadium
    - Cup winner: New Zealand
    - Plate winner: Fiji
    - Bowl winner: France
    - Shield winner: Canada
  - February 13 – 15, 2015: 2015 USA Sevens, in Whitney, Nevada, at the Sam Boyd Stadium
    - Cup winner: Fiji
    - Plate winner: Australia
    - Bowl winner: Kenya
    - Shield winner: Portugal
  - March 27 – 29, 2015: 2015 Hong Kong Sevens at the Hong Kong Stadium
    - Cup winner: Fiji
    - Plate winner: Australia
    - Bowl winner: Scotland
    - Shield winner: Kenya
    - World Series Qualifier winner: Russia
  - April 4 & 5, 2015: 2015 Japan Sevens, in Tokyo, at the Chichibunomiya Rugby Stadium
    - Cup winner: England
    - Plate winner: New Zealand
    - Bowl winner: United States
    - Shield winner: Portugal
  - May 9 & 10, 2015: 2015 Scotland Sevens, in Glasgow, at the Scotstoun Stadium
    - Cup winner: Fiji
    - Plate winner: South Africa
    - Bowl winner: Wales
    - Shield winner: Samoa
  - May 16 & 17, 2015: 2015 London Sevens (final), in England, at the Twickenham Stadium
    - Cup winner: United States
    - Plate winner: New Zealand
    - Bowl winner: Kenya
    - Shield winner: Japan
- December 4, 2014 – May 23, 2015: 2014–15 World Rugby Women's Sevens Series
  - December 4 & 5, 2014: 2014 Dubai Women's Sevens, in the United Arab Emirates, at The Sevens Stadium
    - Cup winner: New Zealand
    - Plate winner: England
    - Bowl winner: Brazil
  - February 7 & 8, 2015: 2015 São Paulo Women's Sevens, in Brazil, at the Arena Barueri
    - Cup winner: New Zealand
    - Plate winner: England
    - Bowl winner: Fiji
  - March 14 & 15, 2015: 2015 USA Women's Sevens, in (Georgia (U.S. state)) Kennesaw, Georgia, at the Fifth Third Bank Stadium
    - Cup winner: New Zealand
    - Plate winner: Australia
    - Bowl winner: Fiji
  - April 18 & 19, 2015: 2015 Canada Women's Sevens, in Langford, British Columbia, at the Westhills Stadium (debut event)
    - Cup winner: New Zealand
    - Plate winner: United States
    - Bowl winner: Spain
  - May 15 & 16, 2015: 2015 London Women's Sevens, in England, at the Twickenham Stoop and Twickenham Stadium (debut event)
    - Cup winner: Australia
    - Plate winner: England
    - Bowl winner: Fiji
  - May 22 & 23, 2015: 2015 Netherlands Women's Sevens (final) at the NRCA Stadium
    - Cup winner: Canada
    - Plate winner: New Zealand
    - Bowl winner: Fiji
- Note: New Zealand, Canada, Australia, and Great Britain qualified to compete in Rugby sevens at the 2016 Summer Olympics.

== See also ==
- 2015 in sports
