= Rugby union in Costa Rica =

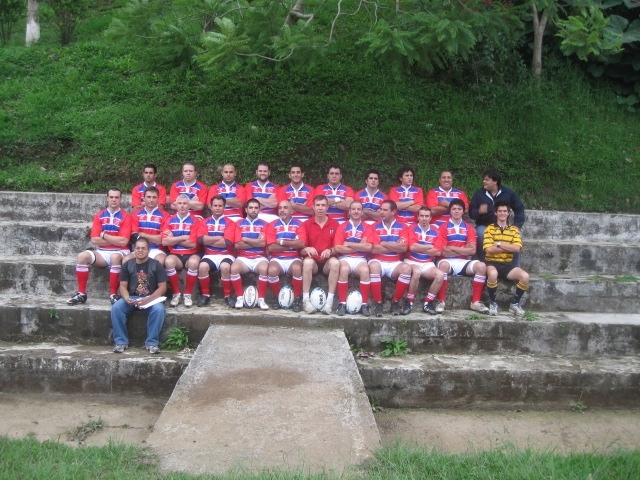
- The Costa Rican national side.
- Country: Costa Rica
- Governing body: Federación de Rugby de Costa Rica
- National team(s): Costa Rica

Rugby union in Costa Rica is a minor, but growing sport.

== Governing body ==
The governing body is the Federación de Rugby de Costa Rica. In 2017, the World Rugby Council unanimously voted in favor of Costa Rica being a full member of World Rugby. They were the ninth Sudamérica Rugby union member to obtain full World Rugby membership.

== History ==
In 2007, Costa Rica helped introduce the game into Guatemala, when the Jules Verne School in Guatemala and Liceo Francés from Costa Rica played one another.

In December, 2007, Costa Rica A & B sides participated in the First Central American Rugby cup. The other competing teams were Panama and Guatemala. Costa Rica A came first in this tournament, Panama 2nd, Guatemala 3rd, and Costa Rica B 4th.

== See also ==
- Costa Rica national rugby union team
