= 2013 South American Rugby Championship "C" =

2° Campeonato Sudamericano de Rugby C
Tournament details
- Host: Costa Rica
- Date: 1–7 December 2013
- Countries: Costa Rica; Ecuador; El Salvador; Guatemala

Tournament statistics
- Matches played: 6

The Confederación Sudamericana de Rugby (CONSUR) Championship C Division Championship took place between 1 and 7 December 2013 at Colegio Franco Costarricense in San Jose, Costa Rica. This was the second time CONSUR had run a 3rd division championship.

Costa Rica hosted Guatemala, Ecuador and El Salvador, with the tournament played over three game days. The tournament was conducted as a single round robin tournament.

Panama and Nicaragua played a friendly international game.

== 2013 CONSUR C Championship ==
Promoted to Division B for 2014

| Place | Nation | Games | | | | Points | | | Table points |
| Place | Nation | Played | Won | Drawn | Lost | For | Against | Diff | Table points |
|---|---|---|---|---|---|---|---|---|---|
| 1 | Ecuador | 3 | 3 | 0 | 0 | 67 | 30 | +37 | 9 |
| 2 | Costa Rica | 3 | 2 | 0 | 1 | 137 | 26 | +111 | 6 |
| 3 | Guatemala | 3 | 1 | 0 | 2 | 64 | 100 | -36 | 3 |
| 4 | El Salvador | 3 | 0 | 0 | 3 | 33 | 145 | -112 | 0 |

Match schedule

| 1 December 2013 | Costa Rica | 71 - 3 | El Salvador | San José, Costa Rica |
| 10:30 | Try: Rafael López, Rafael Ulloa 2, Marlon Cerdas, Franklin Zúñiga 2, Alex Devitre, Nicolás Broggi 2, Byron Monge, Hugo López; Con: Lucas Withington 8 | Report | Pen: Jorge García | Referee: (Argentina) Sebastián Figueroa |

| 1 December 2013 | Guatemala | 11 - 23 | Ecuador | San José, Costa Rica |
| 12:30 | Try: Andersen Merlos; Pen: Estuardo Roehrs 2 Cards: Enrique Coronado (yellow card) | Report | Try: Luis Corozo, Juan Gálvez, John Cacpata; Con: John Cacpata; Pen: John Cacpata 2 Cards: Juan Viola (yellow card) | Referee: (Chile) Jean Paul Casanova |

| 4 December 2013 | Costa Rica | 7 - 13 | Ecuador | San José, Costa Rica |
| 10:00 | Try: Franklin Zúñiga; Con: Lucas Withington | | Try: Cristhian Herrera; Con: John Cacpata; Pen: John Cacpata 2 |

| 4 December 2013 | Guatemala | 43 - 18 | El Salvador | San José, Costa Rica |
| 13:00 |

| 7 December 2013 | Ecuador | 31 - 12 | El Salvador | San José, Costa Rica |
| 11:00 |

| 7 December 2013 | Costa Rica | 59 - 10 | Guatemala | San José, Costa Rica |
| 14:00 |

== Friendly international ==
| 7 December 2013 | Nicaragua | v | Panama | San José, Costa Rica |
| 09:00 |

== See also ==
- 2013 South American Rugby Championship "A"
- 2013 South American Rugby Championship "B"
