= 2014 South American Rugby Championship "C" =

3° Campeonato Sudamericano de Rugby C
Tournament details
- Host: Panama
- Date: 5-11 October 2014
- Countries: Costa Rica; El Salvador; Guatemala; Panama

Tournament statistics
- Matches played: 6

The Confederación Sudamericana de Rugby (CONSUR) Championship C Division Championship took place between 5 and 11 October 2014 at Ciudad Deportiva Kiwanis in Clayton, Panama. This was the third time CONSUR had run a 3rd division championship.

Panama hosted Costa Rica, Guatemala and El Salvador, with the tournament played over three game days.

The tournament draw was conducted in the following manner:

Day 1 - Costa Rica v Panama, Guatemala v El Salvador
Day 2 - Winner Costa Rica/Panama v loser Guatemala/El Salvador, winner Guatemala/El Salvador v loser Costa Rica/Panama
Day 3 - Final (1st place v 2nd place), 3rd place playoff (3rd place v 4th place)

However, after the results of Day 2, which would have resulted in a repeat of the games of Day 1 on Day 3, Day 3 was changed to the third round robin game, with no final.

As a result of winning the tournament, El Salvador won the right to host the 2015 South American Rugby Championship "C".

== 2014 CONSUR C Championship ==
Place	Nation	Games				Points			Table points
Place	Nation	Played	Won	Drawn	Lost	For	Against	Diff	Table points
1	El Salvador	3	2	0	1	71	40	+31	6
2	Guatemala	3	2	0	1	64	58	+6	6
3	Costa Rica	3	2	0	1	54	52	+2	6
4	Panama	3	0	0	3	32	71	–39	0

Match schedule

5 October 2014	Panama	10 - 18	Costa Rica	Ciudad Deportiva Kiwanis, Clayton, Panama
10:00		Match Report		Referee: (Brazil) Murillo Bragotto

5 October 2014	Guatemala	23 - 17	El Salvador	Ciudad Deportiva Kiwanis, Clayton, Panama
11:45		Match Report		Referee: (Colombia) Héctor Serna

8 October 2014	Costa Rica	14 - 25	El Salvador	Ciudad Deportiva Kiwanis, Clayton, Panama
		Report

8 October 2014	Panama	19 - 24	Guatemala	Ciudad Deportiva Kiwanis, Clayton, Panama
		Report

11 October 2014	Panama	3 - 29	El Salvador	Ciudad Deportiva Kiwanis, Clayton, Panama
10:00		Report

11 October 2014	Costa Rica	22 - 17	Guatemala	Ciudad Deportiva Kiwanis, Clayton, Panama
12:30		Report

== See also ==
- 2014 South American Rugby Championship "A"
- 2014 South American Rugby Championship "B"
