= Rugby union in Guatemala =

Rugby union in Guatemala is a minor, but growing sport.

The governing body is the Union de Rugby de Guatemala. On 14 November 2024, they were granted World Rugby Full Member status by the World Rugby Council.

== History ==
=== 2006–2008 ===
The first documented game of rugby union in Guatemala was in 2006, although it may have been played much earlier. The game was between the Jules Verne School in Guatemala and Liceo Francés from Costa Rica.

The first rugby team was founded April 2007 in Quetzaltenango ("Xela"), the second-largest city in Guatemala. Xela Rugby Football Club ("XRFC") was founded in January 2007 by Joshua Macy, an American who at the time was principal at a local school, and Pedro Hecht, a Guatemalan national; together they started XRFC, expanding the sport within the city, and later the rest of the country. A few months later graduates of "Escuela Internacional de Educación Física y Deporte de Cuba" and residents of Guatemala City ("Guate") with the support of expatriates began rugby training thanks to Macy's and Hecht's efforts by sending balls and other equipment to Guatemala City. News of training quickly spread and a team was established in Guate on September 15, 2007. Nilton Noriega, the main organizer of rugby in Guate, and Macy of XRFC were able to make contact.

The difficulty of finding basic training equipment in the country was soon evident. The team in Guatemala City only had an American football and a late 1970s rugby ball for training. The team from Xela, which at that time was better organized, sent the first modern rugby balls to Guatemala City by public transportation in support of the new team.

Due to the Guatemala City team's location and contacts they were tasked to organize the first Guatemalan Rugby Union inter-club game. The event was scheduled to take place October 20, 2007, in Xela. The Guatemala City team, needing an official name before the match, chose to be called the Jaguares by majority vote. The Jaguares won this first game by a score of 17 to 13. The game was covered by the local newspaper El Quezalteco. A rematch was scheduled for November 11, 2007.

Between the first and second matches Nilton Noriega was contacted by Ramón Colé and members of the Costa Rica Rugby Union. Costa Rica having noticed the growth of rugby in their neighboring nations (Guatemala and Panamá) decided to host the first Central American Tournament “Tri-Nations Cup” on December 15, 2007, and extended an invitation to Guatemala. The Jaguares and XRFC met, agreed on selecting a national team and accepted the invitation.

The second rugby game in Guatemala's history took place at Estadio Central del Parque La Democracia on November 11, 2007, in Guatemala City. “Jaguares” won, 21–7. Two major changes happened that day: first the naming of the first national squad as the “Jaguares”, Guatemala City team giving away their name and then choosing by simple vote to be known as “Guatemala Rugby Club” ("GRC"), and the Guatemala Ministry of Sports was contacted to begin formalizing the first national rugby league in Guatemala.

In December, 2007, Guatemala participated in the First Central American Rugby cup. The other competing teams were Panama and the Costa Rica A and B sides. Costa Rica A came first in this tournament, Guatemala captained by Josh Macy came in 2nd, Panama 3rd, and Costa Rica B 4th.

In February 2008 the need for more rugby teams in Guatemala and ideological differences found the departure of players from GRC to create three separate teams. These teams came to be Guatemala Rugby Club, Antigua Rugby Club and Santa Rosa Rugby Club. This brought the total number of club teams in Guatemala to four. The first inter-club tournament was between these teams used a single game elimination structure and was named "Torneo Apertura". The tournament was won by GRC followed by Xela RFC, Santa Rosa and Antigua RC.

With a solid rugby foundation in place Guatemala was better prepared for the 2008 Central American Tri Nations Cup hosted by Costa Rica. Guatemala, again voting Josh Macy as captain, were victorious over the Costa Rica National Team, securing second place with first place taken by a Venezuelan select "30+" team. Panama did not participate.

=== 2009–present ===
The 2009 Guatemalan inter-club tournament was once again won by Guatemala Rugby Club with Xela RFC taking 3rd place. Antigua was unable to support a team in 2009 and were replaced by the first rugby team in El Salvador "Torogoces" which took 2nd place in their debut tournament. Rugby 7s made its tournament debut in Guatemala in 2009 as well. The “Copa República Argentina 7's A-side” sponsored by the Argentine Embassy and Consulate was organized by Santa Rosa RC with teams from: Mexico (Tazmania “A” and “B”), “Red Devils” from Panama, ”Bocaracas” from Costa Rica, Guatemala Rugby Club, Santa Rosa Rugby Club, Xela RFC and a barbarians team participating. Tazmania “A” from Mexico took 1st place, Panama "Red Devils" 2nd, Guatemala Rugby Club taking 3rd place.

In January 2010 the rugby community gathered for the premiere of Invictus to further promote rugby in Guatemala.

Again ideological differences from within GRC ended with the formation of a new team. Several members of GRC left to form Guatemala Quetzal Rugby Club ("GQRC"). GRC filed a complaint with league organizers to have Guatemala Quetzal Rugby Club removed from the tournament for using the country's name "Guatemala" citing that it would cause confusion between prospective players attempting to join GRC. The Quetzales were allowed to play as guests and were undefeated during the 2010 season and secured first place with El Salvador Torogoces "A" in second and GRC in 3rd.

Guatemala did not participate in any international tournaments in 2010.

In 2011 GRC again filed a complaint with league officials regarding the use of "Guatemala" by another club. GRC has since formally dropped all complaints.

== Rugby clubs ==
- Jules Verne Rugby Club
- Antigua Rugby Football Club
- Guatemala Quetzal Rugby Club
- Guatemala Rugby Club
- San Jose Maria Rugby Football Club
- Santa Rosa Rugby Club
- Toros Reu Rugby Club
- Xela Rugby Football Club
- El Salvador national rugby union team ("Torogoces") (non-Guatemalan team participating in Guatemalan Inter-Club Tournament)
