= PDA =

PDA may refer to:

== Law and culture ==
- "PDA" (The Office), an episode from the American television sitcom The Office
- Past Doctor Adventures, spin-off novels from the BBC's Doctor Who
- Pregnancy Discrimination Act, US
- Professional Development Award, offered by Qualifications Scotland
- Pub Design Awards, UK
- Public display of affection, an act of physical intimacy in the view of others

== Music ==
- "PDA" (Interpol song), a song by Interpol
- "PDA", a song by the Backstreet Boys from This Is Us
- "PDA", a song by Audio Adrenaline from Audio Adrenaline
- "P.D.A. (We Just Don't Care)", a song by John Legend

== Organizations ==
- Parenteral Drug Association, a global pharmaceutical trade association
- Pharmacists' Defence Association, UK
- Peruvian Debate Association, for inter-school debating
- Pinoy Dream Academy, the Philippine franchise of Endemol's Star Academy
- Population and Community Development Association, Thailand
- Private defense agency, an enterprise which would provide personal protection and military defense services to individuals
- Professional Driver Association, of NASCAR drivers before the 1969 Talladega 500
- Public development authority, government-owned corporations in Washington, US

== Science and technology ==
- Parts departing aircraft, mid-air loss of screws, rivets, doors, etc.
- Patron-driven acquisition, a mechanism for libraries to purchase books
- Personal digital assistant, an early kind of mobile device
- Photodiode array, a type of detector
- Pitch detection algorithm, to find the pitch of a signal
- Polydiacetylenes, a family of conducting polymers
- Predictive analytics, a form of business analytics
- Pushdown automaton, in automata theory

=== Biology and medicine ===
- Pancreatic ductal adenocarcinoma, the main type of pancreatic cancer
- Pathological demand avoidance, in psychology; also known as persistent drive (for) autonomy or extreme demand avoidance
- Patent ductus arteriosus, a heart defect
- Posterior descending artery, an artery
- Potato dextrose agar, a microbiological medium for culturing yeast and fungus

=== Politics ===
- Alternative Democratic Pole, a political party in Colombia (Polo Democrático Alternativo)
- Aruban Democratic Party, an Aruban political party (Partido Democrático Arubano)
- Movement of Democratic Action, a political party in Bosnia-Herzegovina (Pokret demokratske akcije)
- Party of Democratic Action, a Bosniak party in Bosnia-Herzegovina
- Presidential Drawdown Authority, US presidential power to transfer defense articles and services in emergencies
- Progressive Democratic Alliance, a former political party in British Columbia, Canada
- Progressive Democrats of America, a progressive political organization
