= Rugby union in Panama =

Rugby union in Panama is a minor, but growing sport.

== Governing body ==
The governing body is the Union de Rugby de Panama, which is not affiliated to the IRB.

== History ==
It is uncertain when rugby was first introduced to Panama, but it may have been brought in by either Americans, or British and French sailors.

In December 2006, Panama, represented now by an official rugby club named Diablos Rojos Rugby Club of Panama (D.R.R.C of Panama), played against the Law School Veterans team of Universidad Complutense de Madrid (Madrid, Spain) at Balboa Stadium, located in Ancon, Ciudad de Panama. The result of this game was 14-12 to the Madrid team.

At the beginning of 2008, the "Diablos Rojos" were recognised by the Panamanian Sports Institute as an official rugby club in the country as this acts as a platform for Guadalajara 2011. Their training sessions are held in the sport field nicknamed "El Infierno" which is located in Paraiso's neighbourhood where they've already build the Rugby Posts.

Panama host the 1st Central American Rugby Sevens Tournament on July 19, 2008. The Country as a host for the tournament was represented by the Diablos Rojos Team A & B, and invited teams like Club Santa Rosa from Guatemala, Costa Rica A Team & Costa Rica B team. Diablos Rojos Team A became the 1st champions of the 1st Central American Rugby Sevens Tournament.

Diablos Rojos Rugby Club of Panama is planning to participate on the Independencia de Argentina Rugby Sevens Cup, which will be held in Guatemala during the 4th & the 5th of July 2009, this current year. There will be Rugby Sevens Teams playing from all over the country of Guatemala and invited teams, such as Diablos Rojos Rugby Club and others.

In December, 2007, Costa Rica A & B sides participated in the First Central American Rugby cup. The other competing teams were Panama and Guatemala. Costa Rica A came first in this tournament, Panama 2nd, Guatemala 3rd, and Costa Rica B 4th.

== See also ==
- Panama national rugby union team
