= El Salvador women's national rugby union team =

El Salvador
- Union: Salvadoran Rugby Association
- Head coach: Chad Hayward

First international
- El Salvador 5–50 Guatemala

Biggest defeat
- El Salvador 5–50 Guatemala

The El Salvador women's national rugby union team are a national sporting side that represents El Salvador in Women's rugby union. They played their first international against Guatemala in 2020.

== Background ==
El Salvador played their first international match against hosts, Guatemala, at the Estadio Parque Eric Barrondo in Guatemala City on 8 March 2020. The game was the first ever women's test match that involved Central American countries and was played on the commemoration of International Women's Day.

== Results summary ==
(Full internationals only)

Rugby: El Salvador internationals 2020-
Opponent	First game	Played	Won	Drawn	Lost	Percentage
Guatemala	2020	1	0	0	1	0.00%
Summary	2020	1	0	0	1	0.00%

== Results ==
=== Full internationals ===
Won	Lost	Draw

Test	Date	Opponent	F	A	Winner	Venue
1	8 March 2020	Guatemala	5	50	Guatemala	Estadio Parque Eric Barrondo, Guatemala

== Players ==
=== Current players ===
Jugadoras
Player	Club
Nicole Saénz	(El Salvador)
Dessyré dos Santos	(El Salvador)
Leyla Abullarade	(El Salvador)
Claudia Abullarade	(El Salvador)
Gennifer Rivera	(El Salvador)
Nory Olivares	(El Salvador)
Claudia Mejia	(El Salvador)
Daniella Beltrán	(El Salvador)
Vannesa Umaña	(El Salvador)
Gracia Viana	(El Salvador)
Juana Zambrana	(El Salvador)
Beira Romero	(El Salvador)
Adriana Alvarenga	(El Salvador)
Marcela Deras	(El Salvador)
Renata Deras	(El Salvador)
Aura Soriano	(El Salvador)
Marcela Aguilar	(El Salvador)
