= 2012 South American Rugby Championship "C" =

1° Campeonato Sudamericano de Rugby C
Tournament details
- Host: Guatemala
- Date: 5–8 December 2012
- Countries: Costa Rica; Ecuador; El Salvador; Guatemala

Final positions
- Champions: Costa Rica

Tournament statistics
- Matches played: 6

The Confederación Sudamericana de Rugby (CONSUR) Championship C Division Championship took place between 2 and 8 December 2012 at Estadio de la Democracia in Guatemala City, Guatemala. This was the first time CONSUR had run a 3rd division championship.

Guatemala hosted Costa Rica, Ecuador and El Salvador, with the tournament played over three game days. The tournament was conducted as a single round robin tournament.

Due to visa and travel issues, only eight players from the Ecuador team had arrived by the first game day. As such, a game between Guatemala and a mix of the Ecuadorian players and local players was played as an exhibition game, which resulted in a 40-0 victory for the Guatemala national team. The game was officially awarded to Guatemala as a walkover, by a score of 5-0.

Costa Rica were the champions of the tournament, beating Guatemala in the final round. Guatemala were runners up, with Ecuador finishing third, after a victory over El Salvador on the final day.

== 2012 CONSUR C Championship ==
Place	Nation	Games				Points			Table points
Place	Nation	Played	Won	Drawn	Lost	For	Against	Diff	Table points
1	Costa Rica	3	3	0	0	127	21	+106	9
2	Guatemala	3	2	0	1	69	49	+20	6
3	Ecuador	3	1	0	2	54	38	+16	3
4	El Salvador	3	0	0	3	15	157	-142	0

Match schedule

2 December 2012	Costa Rica	57 – 3	El Salvador	Estadio de la Democracia, Guatemala City, Guatemala
14:30 CST

2 December 2012	Guatemala	5 – 0 (walkover)	Ecuador	Estadio de la Democracia, Guatemala City, Guatemala
16:30 CST		Report

5 December 2012	Ecuador	8 – 33	Costa Rica	Estadio de la Democracia, Guatemala City, Guatemala
11:00 CST		Summary

5 December 2012	Guatemala	54 – 12	El Salvador	Estadio de la Democracia, Guatemala City, Guatemala
14:00 CST		Summary

8 December 2012	Ecuador	46 – 0	El Salvador	Estadio de la Democracia, Guatemala City, Guatemala
10:30 CST				Referee: (Paraguay) Victor Silver

8 December 2012	Guatemala	10 – 37	Costa Rica	Estadio de la Democracia, Guatemala City, Guatemala
13:30 CST				Referee: (Chile) Rodrigo Puelma

== See also ==
- 2012 South American Rugby Championship "A"
- 2012 South American Rugby Championship "B"
