= Guatemala women's national rugby union team =

Guatemala
- Union: Guatemala Rugby Union

First international
- Guatemala 50–5 El Salvador (8 March 2020)

Biggest win
- Guatemala 50–5 El Salvador (8 March 2020)
- Website: Official website

The Guatemala women's national rugby union team are a national sporting side that represents Guatemala in Women's rugby union. They played their first international against El Salvador in 2020.

== Background ==
Guatemala hosted El Salvador in both nations first international match at the Estadio Parque Eric Barrondo in Guatemala City on 8 March 2020. The match was played on International Women's Day and it was the first ever women's test match that involved Central American countries.

== Results summary ==
(Full internationals only)

Rugby: Guatemala internationals 2020-
| Opponent | First game | Played | Won | Drawn | Lost | Percentage |
|---|---|---|---|---|---|---|
| El Salvador | 2020 | 1 | 1 | 0 | 0 | 100% |
| Summary | 2020 | 1 | 0 | 0 | 1 | 100% |

== Results ==
=== Full internationals ===
| Won | Lost | Draw |

| Test | Date | Opponent | F | A | Winner | Venue |
|---|---|---|---|---|---|---|
| 1 | 8 March 2020 | El Salvador | 50 | 5 | Guatemala | Estadio Parque Eric Barrondo, Guatemala City |
