= 2011 South American Rugby Championship "B" =

12° Campeonato Sudamericano de Rugby B
Tournament details
- Host: Peru
- Date: 21–26 August 2011
- Countries: Colombia; Costa Rica; Peru; Venezuela

Final positions
- Champions: Venezuela
- Runner-up: Peru

Tournament statistics
- Matches played: 6

The 2011 South American Rugby Championship "B" was the 12th edition of the second tier competition of the leading national rugby union teams in South America. It was organised by Peru from August 21 through 27, 2011, and was won by Venezuela.

The division "B" (Sudamericano "B") was contested in Lima, Peru, from 21 to 28 August 2011. Participating nations were Peru, holder, Colombia, Venezuela and Costa Rica.

Roster: Graciano Molina (Coach), Luis Zamora (Captain), Juan Carlos Berbesi, Robert Torres, Jhonnattan Arias, Carlos Luis Dugarte, Cesar Lameda, Julio Rodriguez, Leandro Narváez, Daniel Jaramillo, Robert Hernandez, Harry Ramos, Victor Castro, Pablo Barboza, Nicolas Ramirez, Rafael Uzcategui, Luis Romero, Javier Perez, Carlos Eloy Barboza, Carlos Caraza, Gerson Jimenez, Sergio Pulido, Carlos Antonio Gimenez, Diego Ortiz.

The winner was Venezuela, which would meet Paraguay (last of first division) for admission to the "A" 2012 Championship.

== Standings ==
Team	Played	Won	Drawn	Lost	For	Against	Difference	Pts
Venezuela	3	3	0	0	124	46	+ 78	9
Peru	3	2	0	1	91	40	+ 51	6
Colombia	3	1	0	2	56	105	49	3
Costa Rica	3	0	0	3	37	117	80	0

== Matches ==
15 May 2011

Peru	40 - 13	Costa Rica

Centro Deportivo Cultural, Lima

15 May 2011

Venezuela	57 - 19	Colombia

Centro Deportivo Cultural, Lima

18 May 2011

Venezuela	50 - 12	Costa Rica

Centro Deportivo Cultural, Lima

18 May 2011

Peru	36 - 10	Colombia

Centro Deportivo Cultural, Lima

21 May 2011

Colombia	27 - 12	Costa Rica

Centro Deportivo Cultural, Lima

21 May 2011

Peru	15 - 17	Venezuela

Centro Deportivo Cultural, Lima

== See also ==
- 2011 South American Rugby Championship "A"
