= Peruvian Debate Association =

Peruvian non-profit institution

- Asociacion Peruana de Debate
- Abbreviation: APD
- Formation: September 2002
- Founder: Sixto Ramos
- Founded at: Lima, Peru
- Type: Nonprofit
- Purpose: Education
- Region served: Peru
- Members: 12 member schools
- Official language: English, Spanish

The Peruvian Debate Association (Spanish: Asociacion Peruana de Debate; APD) is a legally ordained, non-profit institution, which organizes and coordinates activities to promote and increase debate in and among schools and universities in Peru. This association was founded in September 2002, by Sixto Ramos, Philosophy, Economics and Peruvian History teacher at Colegio Franklin Delano Roosevelt and representatives from 6 other schools: Santa María Marianistas, San Ignacio de Recalde, Markham College, Casuarinas, Newton and Carmelitas. In 2003 the Peruvian Debate Association along with other non-member schools and colleges helped Colegio Franklin Delano Roosevelt organize the World Schools Debating Championship 2003 in Lima, Peru; the grand final was held at a packed auditorium at Universidad de Lima with well over 1000 people attending.

Every month, the member schools participate in regular debates at beginner, intermediate, and advanced levels, with students ranging in age from 11 to 17 years. The APD holds annual try-outs where schools send their best debaters to compete in the selection for the National Team to compete in the World Schools Debating Championship in the so-called "Worlds Style" which is derived from the Parliamentary Debate format.

.

== Main objectives ==
- To spread debate among Peruvian schools in both English and Spanish
- Develop training programs for students coaches and judges
- Support the debate activities organized by member schools
- Organize local, national, and international competitions
- Select the members of the national team who will represent Peru in the World Schools Debating Championship and the Pan-American Competition
- Be open to new school members
- Look for sponsorship for debaters, coaches, and judges to attend international competitions

== Benefits for students ==
Debating allows students to increase and develop their skills in a number of different areas such as: public speaking, logical organization, general knowledge, research, proving a point of view, personal time management, increase in confidence and inter-personal interaction, and teamwork.

== Member schools ==
- Altair School (Peru)
- Abraham Lincoln School
- Casuarinas School
- Franklin D. Roosevelt
- Leonardo Da Vinci School
- Markham College
- Newton College (Peru)
- Peruano Británico
- San Ignacio de Recalde
- San Silvestre
- Colegio Mayor Secundario Presidente del Perú
- Reina de los Ángeles
- Colegio Peruano Japonés La Unión

== Peru in the World Schools Debating Championship ==
Peru sent a team to the WSDC for the first time in 1993 to Medicine Hat, Canada. Members who represented Perú included Bernie Payet, Jackie Fuller and Hugo Huertas del Pino. A brief pause was taken until 1997, then a team was sent to participate in the championship in Bermuda. Ever since Peru has sent a team to compete every year.

Peru's Participation:

- 1993- Canada
- 1997- Bermuda
- 1998- Israel (Semi-finalists)
- 1999- England
- 2000- USA
- 2001- South Africa
- 2002- Singapore
- 2003- Peru
- 2004- Germany (Quarter-finalists)
- 2005- Canada
- 2006- Wales (Octo-finalists)
- 2007- South Korea
- 2008- Washington
- 2009- Athens (Octo-finalists)
- 2010- Qatar
- 2011- Scotland
- 2012- South Africa
- 2013- Turkey (Octo-finalists, ESL Champions)
- 2014- Thailand (Quarter-finalists, ESL Champions)
- 2015- Singapore
- 2016- Stuttgart (Quarter-finalists)
- 2017- Bali (Quarter-finalists, ESL Champions)
- 2019- Bangkok, Thailand

All teams coached by Sixto Ramos except for WSDC in Peru 03 and Canada 05. As of 2012, Sixto Ramos is no longer the official coach of the national team as he retired due to personal problems. For the WSDC 2013, the chosen Coach through vote by the APD is Jorge Gallo, former speaker. For 2014, Luis-Enrique Zela-Koort coached the team and for 2015 the coach was Sebastian Salomón. In 2016, a four-person coaching team was assembled from Peruvian ex-debaters (Jorge Gallo, Sebastían Salomón, Luis Enrique Zela, Sebastián Dasso). The year after in 2017, Luis Enrique Zela and Sebastian Dasso remained as coaches, and took the team to two additional tournaments: (i) The 2017 Harvard Invitational, and (ii) Asian World Schools (AWSDC), the 2017 peruvian team won both tournaments, before WSDC in Bali. Luis Enrique and Sebastian also participated in the WUDC the same year, reaching the ESL finals- the highest achievement any Latin American team has reached so far.

From 1993 to 2001 all team members were from Colegio Roosevelt, From 2002 to 2018 team members have been from different schools including Markham College, Newton College, San Ignacio de Recalde, Carmelitas and Roosevelt.

The team for 2019 World Schools Debating Championship in Bangkok, Thailand was:

- Juan Diego Albin
- Valeria Leon
- Daniella Leon
- Jean Michel Borit
- Fabio Rahman
- Coaching Team: Marcelo Beramendi and Sebastian Dasso

The team for 2017 World Schools Debating Championship in Stuttgart, Germany was:

- Rafael Shimabukuro
- Lorenzo Pinasco
- Lorenzo de la Puente
- Valeria Wu
- Leonardo Jimenez
- Coaching Team: Luis Enrique Zela-Koort, Sebastián Dasso

The team for 2016 World Schools Debating Championship in Stuttgart, Germany was:

- Rafael Shimabukuro
- Lorenzo Pinasco
- Lorenzo de la Puente
- Deweena Parija
- Leonardo Jimenez
- Coaching Team: Jorge Gallo, Luis Enrique Zela-Koort, Sebastián Dasso, Sebastián Salomón.

The team for 2015 World Schools Debating Championship in Pulau Ujong, Singapore was:

- Rafael Shimabukuro
- Lorenzo Pinasco
- Marcelo Beramendi
- Lorenzo de la Puente

Coach: Sebastián Salomón

The team for 2014 World Schools Debating Championship in Bangkok, Thailand was:

- Jose de los Heros
- Sebastian Dasso
- Jose Agustin de la Puente
- Rafael Shimabukuro
- Lorenzo Pinasco
- Marcelo Beramendi (Observer)

Coach: Luis Enrique Zela Koort

The team for the 2013 World Schools Debating Championship in Antalya, Turkey was composed by:

- Jose de los Heros
- Jose Agustin de la Puente
- Sebastian Salomon
- Alex Ferrando (Observer)
- Luis Enrique Zela Koort
- Maria Jose Villanueva

Coach: Jorge Gallo

The team for the 2012 World Schools Debating Championship in Cape Town, South Africa was:

- Jose de los Heros
- Sebastian Salomon
- Franco Scamarone
- Luis Enrique Zela Koort
- Daniela Llirod

Coaches: Sixto Ramos and Jorge Gallo

The team for the 2011 World Schools Debating Championship in Dundee, Scotland was:

- Jose de los Heros
- Daniela Llirod
- Sebastián Salomón
- Luis Enrique Zela-Koort
- Daniella Salazar
- Franco Scamarone (Observer)

Coach: Sixto Ramos

The team for the 2009 World Schools Debating Championship in Athens, Greece was:

- Arturo Montalván (Colegio Roosevelt)
- Patrick Cooper (Colegio Roosevelt)
- Sebastián Llosa (Colegio Roosevelt)
- Giulia Ciliotta (Newton College)
- Karina Rodríguez (Colegio San Ignacio de Recalde)

Coach: Sixto Ramos

The team for the 2008 World Schools Debating Championship in Washington D.C., United States was:

- Arturo Montalván (Colegio Roosevelt)
- Lucas Ghersi (Colegio Roosevelt)
- Gabriel Pulliati (Markham College)
- Stephanie Guin (Newton College)
- Karina Rodríguez (Colegio San Ignacio de Recalde)

Coach: Sixto Ramos

The team for the 2007World Schools Debating Championship 2007 in Seoul, South Korea is:

- Jorge Gallo (Colegio Roosevelt)
- Gloria María González (Colegio Roosevelt)
- Camilla Korder (Colegio Roosevelt)
- Joaquin Ormeño (Colegio Roosevelt)
- Arianna Plevisani (Colegio Roosevelt)

Coach: Sixto Ramos

The team for the 2006 World Schools Debating Championship 2006 in Cardiff, Wales were:

- Christian Grados (Colegio Roosevelt)
- Gloria María González (Colegio Roosevelt)
- Camilla Korder (Colegio Roosevelt)
- Joaquin Ormeño (Colegio Roosevelt)
- Diego Ortiz de Zevallos (Colegio Roosevelt)

Coach: Sixto Ramos The team for the 2005 World Schools Debating Championship in Calgary, Canada was:

- Lorena Alarco (Newton College)
- Ruben Del Aguila (Newton College)
- Kyle Hecht (Newton College)
- Juan Diego Farah (Colegio Roosevelt)
- Gloria Maria Gonzalez (Colegio Roosevelt)

Coach: Alejandro Belmont (Colegio Roosevelt) The team for the 2004 World Schools Debating Championship in Stuttgart, Germany was:

- Nicole Furman (Colegio Roosevelt)
- Kate Gushwa (Newton College)
- Josefa de la Puente (Colegio Roosevelt)
- Jorge Sarmiento (Markham College)

Coach: Sixto Ramos The team for the 2003 World Schools Debating Championship in Lima, Peru was:

- Nicole Furman (Colegio Roosevelt)
- Jamie McTavish (Colegio Roosevelt)
- Lucia Benavides (Colegio Roosevelt)
- Juan Carlos Canessa (Markham College)
- Katie Gushwa (Newton College)

Coach: Fernando Rodrigo (Colegio Roosevelt) The 15th World Schools Debating Championships (WSDC) was hosted in Lima by Colegio Roosevelt in August 2003, the only time the prestigious tournament has taken place in Latin America. 2003 was a notable year for Peruvian debate, as it also marked the first change in coaching. After competing in the 2000, 2001, and 2002 championships as a speaker, Fernando Rodrigo returned as a coach. Under the then Harvard freshman's guidance, the 2003 team made a strong showing by winning as many rounds in the competition as the 2002 and 2001 teams combined. Following in Fernando's footsteps, three of the debaters also made the Top 50 Speakers list that year. Though he was no longer coach, Fernando's continued influence and contribution became even more apparent when the 2004 team made the quarter-finals in Stuttgart. This proved to be a stark contrast to previous years, in which Peru was consistently ranked as one of the lowest scoring countries.

Top 50 Speakers

- 2001:

Fernando Rodrigo (41)

- 2002:

Fernando Rodrigo (32)

- 2003:

Katie Gushwa (39), Nicole Furman (43), Jamie McTavish (45),

- 2004:

No list was made this year

- 2005:

Kyle Hecht (41)

- 2013

Sebastian Salomon (16 ESL tab) Luis Enrique Zela-Koort (48 main tab, 8 ESL tab) Jose de los Heros (20 main tab, 3 ESL tab)

- 2014

Lorenzo Pinasco (9 ESL tab) Jose de los Heros (36 main tab, 5 ESL tab) Sebastian Dasso (29 main tab, 2 EFL tab)

== Peru in the Pan-American Debating Championships ==
Peru has also had very successful participations at the Pan-American Championships, which was created by Sixto Ramos. The first one was held in Lima, Peru in 2002 where Peru debated at the finals vs. Argentina. In 2004 for the Pan-Americans in Buenos Aires, Argentina two teams were sent:

Team 1:

- Jorge Luis Sarmiento (Markham College)
- Nicolás Aguirre (Markham College)
- Lorena Alarco (Newton College)
- Kyle Hecht (Newton College)
- Alfonso de la Torre (Colegio Santa María)

Team 2:

- Ricardo Maertens (Casuarinas)
- Josefa de la Puente Colegio Roosevelt
- Nicole Furman Colegio Roosevelt
- Gloria Maria Gonzalez Colegio Roosevelt
- Nicolas Vega Colegio Roosevelt

Coach: Douglas Scott

This year (2008) the Peruvian Debate Association hosted the Pan-American Championship in Lima, Peru. Delegations from Canada, Bermuda, USA, and Peru participated in a week of intense debates.

Perú won the championship in 2014 Held at Mexico city. Perú 3, debated in the Spanish division Against delegations from Mexico, Argentina, Champagnat, and Chile. The team won 5 of the 6 preliminary debates to then start the quarter-finals. In the quarter-finals the decision was unanimous giving the debate to Perú 3-0 against Champagnat. In the semifinals the debate was given by a unanimous decision 5-0 against Mexico. The final debate about austerity was held at the main auditorium on the Tecnológico de Monterrey. The Decision was given unanimous to Perú 5-0 against Mexico.

The following team won the tournament:

- Marcelo Beramendi (Leonardo Da Vinci)
- Rafael Shimabukuro (San Ignacio del Recalde)
- Gianluca Venegas (Altair)
- Lorenzo Pinasco (Colegio Roosevelt)

The coaches were:

- Jose de los Heros
- Luis Enrique Zela-Koort

A team also participated in the English division of the tournament. This team got to the quarter-final and lost in a tense 2-1 split decision against Canada (who went on to win the championship). The team was composed by:

- Alex Ferrando
- Alejandra Bellatin
- Jose Agustin de la Puente
- Sebastian Dasso

== See also ==
- Debate
