= 2013 South American Rugby Championship "B" =

14° Campeonato Sudamericano de Rugby B
- Date: 25–30 August 2013
- Countries: Colombia; Paraguay; Peru; Venezuela

Tournament statistics
- Matches played: 6

The Confederación Sudamericana de Rugby (CONSUR) B Division Championship in Luque, Paraguay was held during August 2013.

== 2013 CONSUR B Championship ==
| Place | Nation | Games | | | | Points | | | Table points |
| Place | Nation | Played | Won | Drawn | Lost | For | Against | Diff | Table points |
|---|---|---|---|---|---|---|---|---|---|
| 1 | Paraguay (38) | 3 | 3 | 0 | 0 | 95 | 22 | +73 | 9 |
| 2 | Colombia (59) | 3 | 1 | 0 | 2 | 74 | 67 | +7 | 3 |
| 3 | Peru (72) | 3 | 1 | 0 | 2 | 53 | 78 | -25 | 3 |
| 4 | Venezuela (63) | 3 | 1 | 0 | 2 | 50 | 105 | -55 | 3 |

Number in brackets indicates the pre-tournament IRB ranking of team.

| 25 August 2013 | Venezuela | 14 – 32 | Colombia | Rakiura Resort day |
| 17:00 |

| 25 August 2013 | Paraguay | 22 – 0 | Peru | Rakiura Resort day |
| 19:00 |

| 27 August 2013 | Colombia | 27 – 28 | Peru | Rakiura Resort day |
| 19:00 |

| 27 August 2013 | Paraguay | 48 – 7 | Venezuela | Rakiura Resort day |
| 21:00 |

| 30 August 2013 | Venezuela | 29 – 25 | Peru | Rakiura Resort day |
| 18:00 |

| 30 August 2013 | Paraguay | 25 – 15 | Colombia | Rakiura Resort day |
| 20:00 |

== See also ==
- 2013 South American Rugby Championship "A"
- 2013 South American Rugby Championship "C"
