= 2011 South American Rugby Championship "A" =

33° Campeonato Sudamericano de Rugby
Tournament details
- Host: Argentina
- Date: 14–25 May 2011
- Countries: Argentina; Brazil; Chile; Paraguay; Uruguay

Final positions
- Champions: Argentina
- Runner-up: Chile

Tournament statistics
- Matches played: 8

The 2011 South American Rugby Championship "A" was the 33rd edition of the two tiered competition of the leading national rugby union teams in South America.

The tournament was arranged in Argentina, in the city of Puerto Iguazú, except for a match in Posadas. Like in the previous years, four teams played to qualify to the final pool, with Argentina (host) admitted directly. The first two were qualified, keeping the results of their matches also for the second round. Chile won the pool and Uruguay was the runner-up. The Argentina Jaguars won the final, after easy wins over Chile and Uruguay.

== Phase 1 ==
Team	Played	Won	Drawn	Lost	For	Against	Difference	BP	Pts
Chile	3	3	0	0	117	27	+90	0	9
Uruguay	3	2	0	1	159	45	+114	0	6
Brazil	3	1	0	2	75	78	−3	0	3
Paraguay	3	0	0	3	23	224	−201	0	0

- First round

14 May 2011

Uruguay	102–6	Paraguay
	report

Cataratas Rugby Club, Puerto Iguazu
Referee: Henrique Platais (BRA)

14 May 2011

Chile	25–6	Brazil
	report

Cataratas Rugby Club, Puerto Iguazu
Referee: Mauro Rivera (ARG)

- Second round

17 May 2011

Uruguay	39–18	Brazil
	Report

Cataratas Rugby Club, Puerto Iguazu
Referee: Felipe Balbontin (CHI)

17 May 2011

Chile	71–3	Paraguay
	Report

Cataratas Rugby Club, Puerto Iguazu
Referee: Mauro Rivera (ARG)

- Third round

20 May 2011

Brazil	51–14	Paraguay
	report

Cataratas Rugby Club, Puerto Iguazu
Referee: Luis Caviglia (URU)

20 May 2011

Uruguay	18–21	Chile
	Report

Cataratas Rugby Club, Puerto Iguazu
Referee: Carlos Romero (ARG)

== Phase 2 ==
Team	Played	Won	Drawn	Lost	For	Against	Difference	BP	Pts
Argentina XV	2	2	0	0	136	20	+116	0	6
Chile	2	1	0	1	27	79	−22	0	3
Uruguay	2	0	0	2	32	96	−56	0	0

Argentina won the competition.

22 May 2011

Argentina XV	61–6	Chile
	report

Cataratas Rugby Club Puerto Iguazu
Referee: Luis Caviglia (Uruguay)

25 May 2011

Argentina XV	74–14	Uruguay
	Report

Club Capri, Posadas
Referee: Francisco Pastrana (Argentina)

== See also ==
- 2011 South American Rugby Championship "B"
