= 2014 Rugby Europe Women's Sevens – Division B =

- Hosts: Lithuania
- Date: 28 June 2014
- Nations: 12

Final positions
- Champions: Hungary
- Runners-up: Lithuania

Series details
- Matches played: 28

2014 Rugby Europe Women's Sevens Division B is a lowest division European Championships, that will be held in Vingis Park Rugby Stadium, Vilnius, Lithuania.

12 Teams had to compete in the championships: Lithuania, Austria, Slovakia, Luxembourg, Andorra, Turkey, Malta, Latvia, Serbia, Israel, Hungary, Bosnia and Herzegovina. Eventually Andorra and Bosnia & Herzegovina withdrew, so they were replaced by Slovenia and Bulgaria.

== Results ==
=== Group A ===
| Team | Pld | W | D | L | PF | PA | PD | Pts |
|---|---|---|---|---|---|---|---|---|
| Lithuania | 2 | 2 | 0 | 0 | 34 | 19 | +15 | 6 |
| Slovakia | 2 | 1 | 0 | 1 | 36 | 34 | +2 | 4 |
| Austria | 2 | 0 | 0 | 2 | 22 | 39 | -17 | 2 |

28 June 2013

| Austria | 7–15 | Lithuania |

Vingis Park Rugby Stadium, Vilnius

28 June 2013

| Slovakia | 12-19 | Lithuania |

Vingis Park Rugby Stadium, Vilnius

28 June 2013

| Austria | 15-24 | Slovakia |

Vingis Park Rugby Stadium, Vilnius

=== Group B ===
| Team | Pld | W | D | L | PF | PA | PD | Pts |
|---|---|---|---|---|---|---|---|---|
| Hungary | 2 | 2 | 0 | 0 | 90 | 0 | +90 | 6 |
| Luxembourg | 2 | 1 | 0 | 1 | 22 | 47 | -25 | 4 |
| Serbia | 2 | 0 | 0 | 2 | 0 | 65 | -65 | 2 |

28 June 2013

| Hungary | 43–0 | Serbia |

Vingis Park Rugby Stadium, Vilnius

28 June 2013

| Luxembourg | 22-0 | Serbia |

Vingis Park Rugby Stadium, Vilnius

28 June 2013

| Hungary | 47-0 | Luxembourg |

Vingis Park Rugby Stadium, Vilnius

=== Group C ===
| Team | Pld | W | D | L | PF | PA | PD | Pts |
|---|---|---|---|---|---|---|---|---|
| Israel | 2 | 2 | 0 | 0 | 58 | 0 | +58 | 6 |
| Turkey | 2 | 1 | 0 | 1 | 29 | 10 | +19 | 4 |
| Slovenia | 2 | 0 | 0 | 2 | 0 | 77 | -77 | 2 |

28 June 2013

| Israel | 48-0 | Slovenia |

Vingis Park Rugby Stadium, Vilnius

28 June 2013

| Turkey | 29-0 | Slovenia |

Vingis Park Rugby Stadium, Vilnius

28 June 2013

| Israel | 10-0 | Turkey |

Vingis Park Rugby Stadium, Vilnius

=== Group D ===
| Team | Pld | W | D | L | PF | PA | PD | Pts |
|---|---|---|---|---|---|---|---|---|
| Latvia | 2 | 2 | 0 | 0 | 46 | 19 | +27 | 6 |
| Malta | 2 | 1 | 0 | 1 | 35 | 22 | +13 | 4 |
| Bulgaria | 2 | 0 | 0 | 2 | 24 | 64 | -40 | 2 |

28 June 2013

| Latvia | 36-12 | Bulgaria |

Vingis Park Rugby Stadium, Vilnius

28 June 2013

| Malta | 28-12 | Bulgaria |

Vingis Park Rugby Stadium, Vilnius

28 June 2013

| Latvia | 10-7 | Malta |

Vingis Park Rugby Stadium, Vilnius

== Knockout stage ==
=== Bowl ===
Semi-finals
28 June 2014 – Vingis Park Rugby Stadium
Austria | 12
Bulgaria | 17
28 June 2014 – Vingis Park Rugby Stadium
Serbia | 25
Slovenia | 0

Final
28 June 2014 – Vingis Park Rugby Stadium
Bulgaria | 21
Serbia | 5
11th Place
28 June 2014 – Vingis Park Rugby Stadium
Austria | 48
Slovenia | 0

Plate semifinals (5th/8th)

- Slovakia 0-39 Malta
- Luxembourg 0-33 Turkey

7th/8th place

- Slovakia 24-5 Luxembourg

Plate final (5th/6th)

- Malta 26-12 Turkey

Cup semifinals (1st/4th)

- Lithuania 15-5 Latvia
- Hungary 35-12 Israel

3rd place

- Latvia 14-31 Israel

Cup final

- Hungary 40-5 Lithuania

=== Semifinals ===
28 June 2014
17:18

| Lithuania | 15 - 5 | Latvia |

Vingis Park Rugby Stadium, Vilnius
Referee: A. Pratt

28 June 2014
17:40

| Hungary | 35 - 12 | Israel |

Vingis Park Rugby Stadium, Vilnius
Referee: B. Guastini

=== Final ===
28 June 2014

| Lithuania | 5 - 40 | Hungary |

Vingis Park Rugby Stadium, Vilnius
Referee: B. Guastini

== Final standings ==
| Promoted to 2015 European Women's Sevens Championship Division A. |

| # | Teams |
|---|---|
| 1 | Hungary |
| 2 | Lithuania |
| 3 | Israel |
| 4 | Latvia |
| 5 | Malta |
| 6 | Turkey |
| 7 | Slovakia |
| 8 | Luxembourg |
| 9 | Bulgaria |
| 10 | Serbia |
| 11 | Austria |
| 12 | Slovenia |
