= Guatemala Quetzal Rugby Club =

- Full name: Guatemala Quetzal Rugby Club
- Union: Guatemala
- Founded: 2010
- Ground(s): Campo Marte (Capacity: 1,000)
- President: (Guatemala) Rodrigo Barillas
- Coach(es): (Guatemala) Fabricio Tzorin Garcia
- League(s): Asociacion Guatemalteca de Rugby
Team kit

Official website
- www.quetzalrugby.com

The Guatemala Quetzal Rugby Club (GQRC) is a rugby team based in Guatemala City, Guatemala. They participate in the Asociacion Guatemalteca de Rugby 15s tournament. The club takes pride in its connection to Guatemala City and the Guatemalan national bird, the Quetzal, which serve as club identifiers. The team is mainly composed of Guatemalan players, representing 95% of the club.

In its first two years, the club used Maya numerals on the back of their jerseys to identify a player's position.

== History ==
The Guatemala Quetzal Rugby Club (GQRC) was founded on March 4, 2010, making it the 6th rugby club in the history of Guatemalan rugby. The club was established by a mix of Guatemalans and expatriates with the goal of elevating the level of play in Guatemala through competition in existing tournaments. The first formal training session was held at the Inter-American College of Guatemala on March 20, 2010.

Initially, the club faced opposition in joining the 2010 tournament due to a file submitted to mediation by another club in Guatemala City, but with the support of other participating clubs and El Salvador's national team (Torogoces), the case was dismissed, allowing GQRC to enter the national competition. The club achieved its first championship title, becoming the first team in Guatemalan rugby history to do so undefeated.

In 2011, the club became formally incorporated into the Antigua Guatemalan Rugby Association and commenced training in January of that year. It proved to be a fruitful year for the club, securing a second championship with only one game lost.

However, the club faced administrative changes in 2012, resulting in unfavorable consequences for both sports and administration. As a result, the team did not advance beyond the qualifying stage in the 2012 season. By the last quarter of 2012, a new board of directors was formed to reorganize the club.

In 2013, the women's team of Rugby Seven 7s was established, participating in the Women's Major League. They have been undefeated champions since their inception in 2013 and have represented the club in international competitions, achieving first place in the Maquilishuat Cup in El Salvador in 2016 and second place in 2017.

The Quetzales Rugby club currently contributes over 60% of players to the female rugby team, representing Guatemala in various international tournaments. Additionally, the men's team of Quetzales has contributed around 40% of players for the rugby men's team. The club has produced five certified referees of different levels, supporting the development of the national rugby league.

Furthermore, the club has two high-level coaches who have led the Guatemalan team to numerous international championships:

For the female branch: Fabrizio Tzorín

For the male branch in 15s mode: Jorge Montenegro

== Founders of the club ==
The founders of the club are as follows:

- (Guatemala) Ricardo Alvarado Anguiano
- (Argentina) Nicolas Pelayes
- (Canada) Colin Brown
- (United States) Farzad Darouian
- (England) David Horner
- (Argentina) Lautaro Cayarga Paoltroni

== Honors ==
Male Team:

- Guatemalan National Champion 2010 (undefeated)
- Guatemalan National Champion 2011
- The team played the semifinal game of the Guatemalan league against Cuscatlán Rugby Club in 2013
- Guatemalan National Champion 2018 (7s modality)

Female Team:

- Guatemalan National Champion 2014 (7s Modality)
- Guatemalan National Champion 2015 (7s Modality)
- Guatemalan National Champion 2016 (7s Modality)
- 1st place in Maquilishuat cup held in El Salvador (7s Modality)
- Guatemalan National Champion 2017 (7s Modality)
- 2nd place in Maquilishuat cup held in El Salvador (7s Modality)
- Guatemalan National Champion 2018 (7s Modality)
- National Guatemalan Champion 2018 (Tag Modality)

== Sponsorship ==
The primary sponsor of GQRC is Rattle'n Hum Bar of Guatemala City, which also serves as the team's clubhouse. Colegio Interamericano supports the team by providing the use of their secure training area. WorldGym Guatemala is the club's official gym.

== Recruiting ==
GQRC promotes the sport of rugby in Guatemala by engaging with local schools, embassies, and volunteer work to seek out new players. Additionally, the club organizes rugby clinics to further promote the sport.

== See also ==
- Rugby union in Guatemala
