= Vingis Park Rugby Stadium =

Rugby union stadium in Vilnius, Lithuania

Coordinates: 54°41′7″N 25°13′42″E

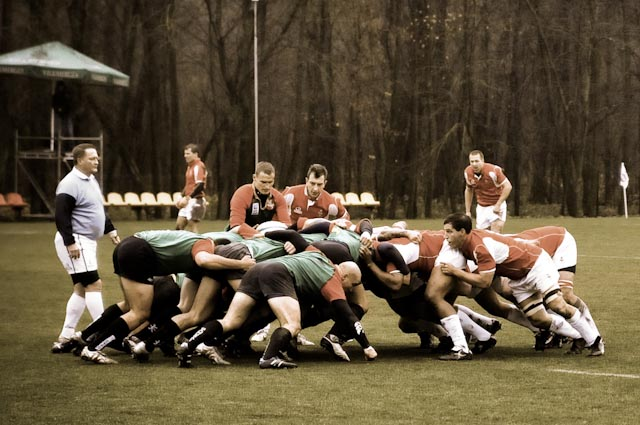
- Interactive map of Vingis Park Rugby Stadium
- Location: Vilnius, Lithuania
- Surface: Grass

Tenants
- RK Geležinis Vilkas; Lithuania women's national rugby union team (sevens); Lithuania national rugby union team (sevens)

Vingis Park Rugby Stadium (Lithuanian: Vingio parko regbio stadionas) is a rugby union stadium in Vilnius, Lithuania. It is located in Vingis Park, next to the city's main athletics stadium, Vingis Park Stadium.

In 2014 the stadium hosted the 2014 European Women's Sevens Championship Division B.
