= Salvadoran Rugby Association =

Salvadoran Rugby Federation
Federación Salvadoreña de Rugby
- Sport: Rugby union
- Founded: 2009; 16 years ago
- President: Luis Donis

The Salvadoran Rugby Federation (Spanish: Federación Salvadoreña de Rugby) is the governing body for rugby in El Salvador. The Federation also controls the national team, known as the Torogoces. the board directors are as follow : President Fanny Saravia, Treasure Mauricio Mendez, Secretary Fatima Calderon, Directors : Irene Rivera, Vladimir Salguero and Moises Noches
