= Parenteral Drug Association =

International non-profit trade group for pharmaceutical manufacturers

- Abbreviation: PDA
- Formation: 1946; 80 years ago
- Founders: Group of pharmaceutical manufacturers
- Type: Nonprofit trade association
- Legal status: Trade association
- Purpose: Coordinator of science, technology, and regulatory information for pharmaceutical industry
- Location: Bethesda, MD, United States
- Region served: Worldwide
- Services: Advocacy and information for the pharma industry
- President and CEO: Craig Elliot
- Affiliations: PDA Foundation for Pharmaceutical Education, Training and Research (PDAF)
- Funding: Members fees
- Website: www.pda.org

The Parenteral Drug Association (PDA) is an international non-profit industry trade group for pharmaceutical and biopharmaceutical manufacturers. The PDA aims to provide scientifically sound, practical technical information and expertise to advance pharma manufacturing science and regulation.

The PDA also runs special interest groups where pharmaceutical manufacturers share information, experiences and best practices relating to pharmaceutical manufacturing.

== History ==
The PDA was founded in 1946 as the Parenteral Drug Association by a small group of pharmaceutical manufacturers who recognized the need for an organization to disseminate technical information within the industry, it grew to have more than 11,000 members worldwide.

== Structure ==
The association is split into regional chapters and has members in 74 countries and regions including Africa, Asia Pacific, Europe, North America and South America.
