= Ecuador national rugby union team =

Ecuador
- Union: Federacion Ecuatoriana de Rugby
- Nickname: Los Piqueros (The Blue footed booby)
Team kit

First international
- Costa Rica 33–8 Ecuador (Ciudad de Guatemala, Guatemala; 5 December 2012)

Largest win
- Ecuador 46–0 El Salvador (Ciudad de Guatemala, Guatemala; 8 December 2012)

Largest defeat
- Colombia 112–0 Ecuador (Apartadó, Colombia; 31 August 2014)

The Ecuador national rugby union team represents Ecuador in international rugby union play. Ecuador recently became a member of the Confederación Sudamericana de Rugby in 2011. They are not affiliated with World Rugby, and will not play qualifiers for the Rugby World Cup until it is. The Ecuadorian Rugby Federation governs the sport of rugby in the country.

Ecuador played their first international tournament in December 2012, playing in the 2012 CONSUR C Championship, finishing third out of four teams.

== Players ==
Rugby in Ecuador is very much a minor sport so there are very few players who play professionally. The only current professional rugby player from Ecuador is Miguel Ángel Coronel Densy who plays for the current Spanish champions La Vila in the División de Honor and the Amlin Challenge Cup.

== Record ==
Below is a table of the representative rugby matches played by an Ecuador national XV at test level up until 8 October 2016, updated after match with Peru.

Opponent	Played	Won	Lost	Drawn	% Won
Colombia	3	0	3	0	0%
Colombia A	1	0	1	0	0%
Costa Rica	2	1	1	0	50%
El Salvador	2	2	0	0	100%
Guatemala	2	2	0	0	100%
Peru	5	0	5	0	0%
Venezuela	3	0	3	0	0%
Total	18	5	13	0	27.78%
