= Newton College (Peru) =

Coordinates: 12.0817°S 76.9262°W

Location
- Av. Ricardo Elias Aparicio 240, Urb. Las Lagunas; La Molina, Lima; Peru

Information
- Type: Private coeducational
- Motto: Facite Omnia Sapienter (Latin: "Use Common Sense")
- Established: 1979
- School district: La Molina
- Headmaster: Richard Quantrill
- Grades: Level 1, Level 2, Pre-Kinder, Kindergarten; Lower School Year 1-5, Upper School Year 6 - Year 12; Year 12 is optional but necessary to complete the IB Diploma Programme
- Enrollment: 1,580 approx.
- Campus: Suburban
- Houses: Tudor, York, Lancaster, Windsor
- Student Union/Association: OLNEAS
- Colours: Green, White
- Mascot: Lion
- Nickname: Newtonians
- Yearbook: The Apple
- Affiliation: ADCA (Asociación de Colegios Privados de Asociaciones Culturales) LAHC (Latin American Heads Conference) BSP (British Schools of Peru), GAIL (Global Alliance for Innovative Learning)
- OLNEAS (Old Newtonians Association): Old Newtonian Association
- Primary languages: English and Spanish
- Website: www.newton.edu.pe

Newton College is a Peruvian British co-educational private school in Lima, Peru. It was founded in 1979 with the purpose of offering a modern, humanistic, technological education. It was to be British in outlook but with an international philosophy.

It is a semi-immersion, bilingual school delivering 50% of the curriculum in English and 50% in Spanish up to Year 3. As students progress through the school more of the curriculum is taught in English and for the IB Diploma Programme students may study five of their six chosen courses in English. Newton College was the first school in Peru to deliver the International Baccalaureate curriculum. It offers all its students the Primary Years Programme (2-11 year olds), the Middle Years Programme (11-16 year-olds), and the Diploma Programme (16–18 years olds).

The curriculum gives equal importance to all subjects and all three creative arts (Music, Drama and Visual Art) are taught to all students up to Year 8, when they become optional courses. All students learn to play a musical instrument from the age of 5. The school also offers a wide range of extra-curricular activities: community service projects, all major sports, Drama Club, Model United Nations, debating, gardening, scouts, etc.

Newton College has approximately 1,560 students, 85% of whom are Peruvian. It is located in an 11 hectare campus next to a lake in the leafy suburb of la Molina. It has facilities, extensive sports fields and beautiful gardens. In addition, the school owns a large plot of land in the Amazon rainforest - the Sachavacayoc Centre, in the district of Tambopata (Madre de Dios), where there is a purpose-built study centre that allows secondary- aged students to study the different ecosystems and collect data for their IBDP Geography and Biology investigations; university students may apply to do postgraduate research at the centre.

In 2006, the British newspaper, The Guardian Weekly, listed it as "one of the eight leading British-style, bilingual, international schools in the world".

== The House System ==
At Newton College students are divided into four houses that compete throughout the year in academic, cultural and sports activities such as football, volleyball, rugby, swimming, cross country, chess, quizzes, scavenge, debates, among others, in order to obtain the school shield. The four houses are Lancaster, Tudor, Windsor, and York, named after the British royal houses.

== Notable alumni ==
- Claudia Llosa, film director, writer and producer, nominated for Best Foreign Language film
- Nicolás Pacheco, sport shooter, competed in the 2012 Summer Olympics and 2020 Summer Olympics
- Maser Madueño, President of the Peruvian Rugby Federation (2013—2016)
- Víctor Andrés Marroquín-Merino – actor, political consultant, and historian; Secretary of International Relations of the Peruvian Aprista Party
