= El Salvador national rugby union team =

El Salvador
- Union: Salvadoran Rugby Association
- Nickname(s): Los Torogoces (turquoise-browed motmots)
- Coach: Alvaro Gorostiza
Team kit

First international
- Costa Rica 57 - 3 El Salvador (Ciudad de Guatemala, Guatemala; 2 December 2012)

Largest win
- El Salvador 32 - 0 Panama (San Salvador, El Salvador; 6 December 2015)

Largest defeat
- Guatemala 114 - 0 El Salvador (Ciudad de Guatemala, Guatemala; 13 August 2017)

World Cup
- Appearances: 0

The El Salvador national rugby union team (Spanish: rugby union equipo nacional de El Salvador), nicknamed Los Torogoces, represents El Salvador in rugby union. They had their first international tournament in 2011 in Costa Rica along the other teams from Central America, winning the Silver Cup.

== History ==
El Salvador started playing matches against Guatemalan clubs in 2009, losing 3−85 against Xela and winning 37–11 against Santa Rosa. Consequently, a victory against Xela Rugby Club 17–0, after clinching the second place in the Guatemalan Championship the "Torogoces" prepare 2 teams to give battle in the upcoming championship, which is in this case to bring the 1st place.

El Salvador's coaches are from France and Argentina. Recently, the Salvadoran Rugby Association (Federacion Salvadorena de Rugby) was recognized as a federation from the local Olympic committee, making it an official recognized sport in El Salvador.

El Salvador played their first international against Costa Rica as part of the 2012 South American Rugby Championship "C". They recorded their first international win, during the 2014 ARC, over Costa Rica. They went on to defeat Panama, which secured their first major tournament victory.

== Record ==
Below is a table of the representative rugby matches played by a Greece national XV at test level up until 25 August 2018, updated after match with Panama.

Opponent	Played	Won	Lost	Drawn	% Won
Costa Rica	5	1	4	0	20%
Ecuador	2	0	2	0	0%
Guatemala	10	0	10	0	0%
Honduras	1	1	0	0	100%
Nicaragua	1	1	0	0	100%
Panama	4	2	2	0	50%
Total	23	5	18	0	21.74%

== Tournaments ==
South American Rugby Championship
Year	Tournament level	Win/Loss	Position
2012	C	0–3	4/4
2013	C	0–3	4/4
2014	C	2–1	1/4
2015	C	1–2	3/4
2016	C	0–3	4/4
2017	-	-	-
2018	C	1–1	2/3

== Leadership ==
Coaches
Alvaro Gorostiza (Esp)
Juan Carlos Peréz (Esp)

Board of Directors

- Chairman: Daniel Ola
- Vice chair: Nelson Bolaños
- Treasurer: Diana Diaz
- Secretary: Moisés Nóchez

== Players ==
=== Current players ===
El Salvador's rugby union team has a mixture of local young athletes with the reinforcement of experienced foreign players. Torogoces now remains as El Salvador's national team, recognized by CONSUR as a member and will participate in south and Central American tournaments under that name. Rugby in this country has evolved and two clubs have been created: Cuscatlan Rugby Club and Santa Tecla Rugby Club, both still participating in the binational club league with Guatemala. Players from both teams will be selected by trainers and the Federacion Salvadorena de Rugby to be part of Torogoces for international tournaments. In September 2013, Cuscatlán Rugby Club became the first Salvadoran team to win the Bi-National League with Guatemala.

Backs
Player	Position	Club
Adrien Martinez Almansa	Scrum-half	(El Salvador)
Vladimir Salguero	Scrum-half	(El Salvador)
Jorge García Herrera (Cap)	Fly-half	(El Salvador)
Francisco Deras	Fly-half	(El Salvador)
Felipe Flores	Fly-half	(El Salvador)
Oscar Rodriguez	Fly-half	(El Salvador)
Moisés Nóchez	Centre	(El Salvador)
Erick Salas	Centre	(El Salvador)
Oscar Díaz	Centre	(El Salvador)
Roberto Martínez	Centre	(El Salvador)
Jimmy Melara	Centre	(El Salvador)
Raul Arevalo	Wing	(El Salvador)
Jose Gonzalez	Wing	(El Salvador)
Oscar Diaz	Wing	(El Salvador)
Samuel Zelaya	Wing	(El Salvador)
Gerardo Martinez	Wing	(El Salvador)
Mauricio Lazo	Fullback	(El Salvador)
Pablo Guth	Fullback	(El Salvador)
Gerardo Valenzuela	Fullback	(El Salvador)

Forwards
Player	Position	Club
Enrique Angulo	Hooker	(El Salvador)
Pablo Maza	Hooker	(El Salvador)
Diego Albón	Prop	(El Salvador)
Erick Perdomo	Prop	(El Salvador)
Herman Arrua	Prop	(El Salvador)
Joaquín Fuentes	Prop	(El Salvador)
Walter Martinez	Prop	(El Salvador)
Fares Canizalez	Lock	(El Salvador)
Xavier Luna	Lock	(El Salvador)
Napoleón Vargas	Lock	(El Salvador)
Rodrigo Ramirez	Lock	(El Salvador)
Nelson Bolanos	Lock	(El Salvador)
Jorge Cacerés	Lock	(El Salvador)
Victor Carcamo	Flanker	(El Salvador)
Douglas Lopez	Flanker	(El Salvador)
Efraín Hernández	Flanker	(El Salvador)
David Alfaro	Flanker	(El Salvador)
Eduardo Bonilla Solís	Flanker	(El Salvador)
Rafael Ramírez	Flanker	(El Salvador)
Angel"Tank"Yanes	Flanker	(El Salvador)
Roberto Dubois	Flanker	(El Salvador)
Ricardo Avendano	Number eight	(El Salvador)
Luis Vilanova	Number eight	(El Salvador)

== See also ==
- Salvadoran Rugby Association
- Rugby union in El Salvador
