= Panama national rugby union team =

Panama
- Union: Unión de Rugby de Panamá
- Nickname: "Diablos Rojos" (Red Devils)
Team kit

First international
- Panama 0 - 60 Costa Rica (19 February 2005)

Largest defeat
- Costa Rica 95 - 5 Panama (27 August 2017)

The Panama national rugby union team represents Panama in rugby union. They are nicknamed the "Diablos Rojos" (Red Devils).

== History ==
Panama's first international match was in 2005, in Panama City, Panama, against Costa Rica, which they lost 60-0.

In December 2006, Panama, represented now by an official rugby club named Diablos Rojos Rugby Club of Panama (D.R.R.C of Panama), played against the Law School Veterans team of Universidad Complutense de Madrid (Madrid, Spain) at Balboa Stadium, located in Ancon, Panama City. The result of this game was 14-12 to the Madrid team.

Panama were accepted into, and hosted, the CONSUR Mayor C tournament.

== Record ==
Below is a table of the representative rugby matches played by a Panama national XV at test level up until 25 August 2018, updated after match with El Salvador.

Opponent	Played	Won	Lost	Drawn	% Won
Costa Rica	7	0	7	0	0%
El Salvador	4	2	2	0	50%
Guatemala	5	0	5	0	0%
Honduras	1	1	0	0	100%
Nicaragua	2	1	1	0	50%
Total	19	4	15	0	21.05%

== See also ==
- Rugby union in Panama
