= Costa Rica national rugby union team =

- Nickname: Ticos
- Union: Federación de Rugby de Costa Rica (FRCR)
- Head coach: Miguel Castillo
- Captain: Leonardo Muñoz Recalde
First colours

World Rugby ranking
- Current: 99 (as of 4 November 2024)
- Highest: 93 (23 November 2020)
- Lowest: 100 (2024)

First international
- Costa Rica 60–0 Panama (19 February 2005)

Biggest win
- Costa Rica 91–5 Panama (Tres Rios, Costa Rica; 27 August 2017)

Biggest defeat
- Colombia 136–0 Costa Rica (Medellín, Colombia; 25 September 2024)

World Cup
- Appearances: 0

National Squads 2009 - 2012

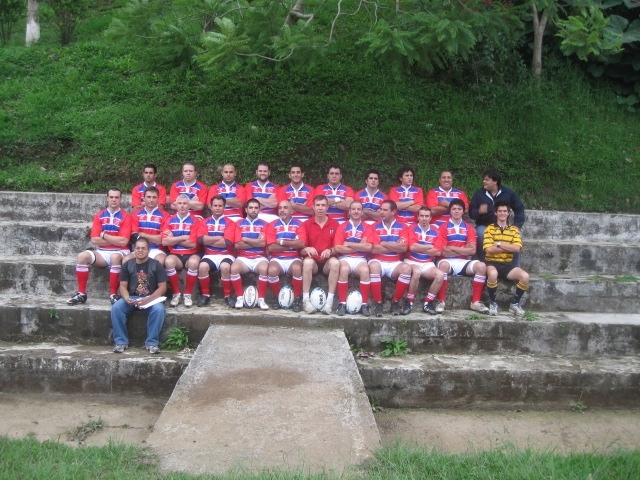
Costa Rica in 2009

The Costa Rica national rugby union team represents Costa Rica in international rugby union. The nation have yet to play in a Rugby World Cup tournament. The Costa Rica national rugby team played their first international in 2005 defeating their opponents Panama by 60–0.

In December, 2007, Costa Rica A & B sides participated in the First Central American Rugby cup. The other competing teams were Panama and Guatemala. Costa Rica A came first in this tournament, Panama 2nd, Guatemala 3rd, and Costa Rica B 4th.

In December 2009, Costa Rica hosted the IRB Consur B tournament. The other competing nations were Colombia, Venezuela, Peru, and Costa Rica. The final results were Colombia finishing first, Venezuela second, Peru third, and Costa Rica fourth.

After finishing fourth behind Peru, Venezuela and Colombia in the 2010 and 2011 CONSUR B tournaments, Costa Rica played in the newly created CONSUR C tournament in 2012. They won this tournament, beating Guatemala, Ecuador and El Salvador.

== Overall Record ==
Below is a table of the representative rugby matches played by a Costa Rica national XV at test level up until 31 October 2026, updated after match with Peru.

Opponent	Played	Won	Lost	Drawn	% Won
Brazil	1	0	1	0	0%
Cayman Islands	1	0	1	0	0%
Colombia	5	0	5	0	0%
Ecuador	2	1	1	0	50%
El Salvador	5	4	1	0	80%
Guatemala	9	5	3	1	55.56%
Mexico A	1	0	1	0	0%
Nicaragua	2	2	0	0	100%
Panama	7	7	0	0	100%
Peru	9	1	8	0	11.11%
Venezuela	4	0	4	0	0%
Total	46	20	25	1	43.48%

== Players ==
=== Recent squad ===
In December 2012, Costa Rica played in the newly created CONSUR C tournament. They won this tournament, beating Guatemala by 37 to 10, Ecuador by 33 to 8 and El Salvador by 57 to 3.

Following this achievement a staff and a five months preparation were called for trials. Coach Francisco José "El Gordo Secret" Galarreta Apaestegui and his manager Wadya "Dr. Evil" Sauma assembled the squad that lead them into victory. The 2012 Costa Rican rugby union team demonstrated the country's rugby at its best, included players representing rugby unions from across the country.

The 2012 CONSUR C 25-player squad:

Player	Position	Club
Marco Blanco	Prop	(Costa Rica) Coronado RC
Guillermo Lavari	Prop	(Costa Rica) Stag RFC
Jefry Vargas	Prop	(Costa Rica) Cadejos RC
Marvin Taylor Ebanks	Prop	(Canada) Montreal Irish RFC
Claudio Carrizo	Hooker	(Costa Rica) Stag RFC
Alexis Devitre	Lock	(Costa Rica) Universitarios Club de Rugby
Meyer Zúñiga Fernández	Lock	(Costa Rica) Cartago RC
Hugo López Póveda	Lock	(Costa Rica) Cartago RC
Nicolas Broggi	No. 8	(Costa Rica) Universitarios Club de Rugby
Marlon Cerdas Blanco	No. 8	(Costa Rica) Coronado RC
Fernando Ramírez Esquivel	Flanker	(Costa Rica) Wák RC
Pierric Béros	Flanker	(Costa Rica) Stag RFC
Sebastián Gutiérrez del Valle	Scrum Half	(Costa Rica) Stag RFC
Leonardo Muñoz Recalde	Scrum Half	(Costa Rica) Wák RC
Iván Bogantes Miranda	Fly Half	(Costa Rica) Universitarios Club de Rugby
Ignacio Maqueda	Fly Half	(Costa Rica) Stag RFC
Lucas Withington	Fly Half / Center	(Costa Rica) Stag RFC
Rafael Ulloa Beeche	Center	(Costa Rica) Wák RC
Franklin Zúñiga	Center	(Costa Rica) Stag RFC
Rafael López Póveda	Full Back	(Costa Rica) Cartago RC
Ariel Apuy	Full Back	(Costa Rica) Universitarios Club de Rugby
Juan José Mata Zúñiga	Wing	(Costa Rica) Universitarios Club de Rugby
Gustavo Patiño	Wing	(Costa Rica) Cadejos RC
César Salas	Wing	(Costa Rica) Cadejos RC
Byron Monge Benavides	Wing	(Costa Rica) Universitarios Club de Rugby

=== Coaches ===
Coach	Tenure
Pablo Gonzales Lucas	2009
Charles	2010
Larry Grech	2011
Francisco José Galarreta Apaestegui	2012
Rodrigo Etchart	2020–2021
Rony Reperger	2022–2023
Miguel Castillo	2024–
