= Guatemala national rugby union team =

Guatemala
- Union: Asociación Deportiva Nacional de Rugby Guatemalteca
- Nickname: Jaguares
Team kit

First international
- Costa Rica 10–0 Guatemala (San José, Costa Rica; 15 December 2007)

Largest win
- Guatemala 114–0 El Salvador (Concepción de Tres Ríos, Costa Rica; 27 August 2017)

Largest defeat
- Peru 64–8 Guatemala (Lima, Peru; 26 August 2023)

The Guatemala national rugby union team represents Guatemala in rugby union.

In December 2007, Guatemala participated in the First Central American Rugby cup. The other competing teams were Panama and Costa Rica A & B. Costa Rica A came first in this tournament, Panama 2nd, Guatemala 3rd, and Costa Rica B 4th. The team was captained by Josh Macy.

In December 2008, Guatemala participated in the Central American Tri Nations Cup hosted by Costa Rica. The other competing teams were Venezuela Select 30+ and Costa Rica A & B. Venezuela came first in this tournament, Guatemala 2nd, Costa Rica A 3rd, and Costa Rica B 4th. The team was again captained by Josh Macy.

Nationally, there are about 10 clubs in Guatemalas. While the national league collaborates with the Salvadorian team and two others, it's called the Binacional League.

== Record ==
Below is a table of the representative rugby matches played by a Guatemala national XV at test level up until 27 June 2026, updated after match with Costa Rica.

| Opponent | Played | Won | Lost | Drawn | % Won |
|---|---|---|---|---|---|
| Costa Rica | 9 | 3 | 5 | 1 | 33.33% |
| Ecuador | 2 | 0 | 2 | 0 | 0% |
| El Salvador | 5 | 5 | 0 | 0 | 100% |
| Honduras | 1 | 1 | 0 | 0 | 100% |
| Nicaragua | 1 | 1 | 0 | 0 | 100% |
| Panama | 4 | 4 | 0 | 0 | 100% |
| Peru | 1 | 0 | 1 | 0 | 0% |
| Total | 23 | 14 | 8 | 1 | 60.87% |

== External links and references ==
- (in Spanish and English) Rugby Guatemala
- (in Spanish and English) Guatemala Rugby Club
- (in Spanish and English) Guatemala Quetzal Rugby Club
- (in Spanish) Rugby Guatemala
- Guatemala's rugby story
- Jose Macy
