= List of Argentina national rugby union players =

List of Argentina national rugby union players is a list of people who have played for the Argentina national rugby union team. The list only includes players who have played in a Test match recognised by the Argentine Rugby Union.

Note that the "position" column lists the position at which the player made his Test debut, not necessarily the position for which he is best known. A position in parentheses indicates that the player debuted as a substitute.

== Sources ==
The main original source for the information in this list is Scrum.com's database listing of Country caps for Argentina. Although largely comprehensive, there have been known inconsistencies noted when relying entirely on this database. Where these have been found for this specific list, it is noted. Additionally, when other historic sources conflict with this database, or where they provide additional detail, this has also been noted.

== The first test ==
Argentina's International Rugby Capped Players
Number	Name	Position	Date first cap obtained	Opposition
1	A. Bover	prop	1910-06-12	v Great Britain XV at Flores
2	A. Donelly	hooker	1910-06-12	v Great Britain XV at Flores
3	Oswald Gebbie	centre	1910-06-12	v Great Britain XV at Flores
4	L.H. Gribbell	flanker	1910-06-12	v Great Britain XV at Flores
5	Fairy Heatlie	no. 8	1910-06-12	v Great Britain XV at Flores
6	F. Henrys	lock	1910-06-12	v Great Britain XV at Flores
7	Frank Heriot	centre	1910-06-12	v Great Britain XV at Flores
8	W.H. Hyman	flanker	1910-06-12	v Great Britain XV at Flores
9	C.J. MacCarthy	wing	1910-06-12	v Great Britain XV at Flores
10	Carlos Mold	fly-half	1910-06-12	v Great Britain XV at Flores
11	Alvan Reid	prop	1910-06-12	v Great Britain XV at Flores
12	J.E. Saffery	fullback	1910-06-12	v Great Britain XV at Flores
13	Frederick Sawyer	lock	1910-06-12	v Great Britain XV at Flores
14	Henry Talbot	wing	1910-06-12	v Great Britain XV at Flores
15	Arnaldo Watson Hutton	scrum-half	1910-06-12	v Great Britain XV at Flores
	O Throp^{1}	scrum-half	1910-06-12	v Great Britain XV at Flores
	WF Bridger^{1}	scrum-half	1910-06-12	v Great Britain XV at Flores
	D Mackay^{1}	scrum-half	1910-06-12	v Great Britain XV at Flores
	FLH Maitland^{1}	scrum-half	1910-06-12	v Great Britain XV at Flores
	J Monks^{1}	scrum-half	1910-06-12	v Great Britain XV at Flores
	K. G. Drysdale^{1}	scrum-half	1910-06-12	v Great Britain XV at Flores

#The first fifteen players listed above represent those taken from scrum.com (as described in Source above). A separate source, from an article by Paul Dobson entitled Argentina and the 'Lions' in the past agrees with the listing (with the exception of some spelling, Bovet for Bover, Hayman for Hyman, and Watson for Watson-Hutton). This itself is sourced from Eduardo Maschwitz's 100 Anos de la Union Argentina de Rugby. However, Dobson cites an earlier book, Los Pumas, that gives a different team, replacing Hayman, Heriot, Mold and Henrys with O Throp (Buenos Aires), WF Bridger (Rosario), D Mackay (Buenos Aires), FLH Maitland (Belgrano) and J Monks (Lomas). Another contemporary source adds to the confusion, because in 1910, Dulwich College, in its school magazine The Alleynian published news of former pupils that had played for "the Argentine v. the English Rugby Union Team". On page 396 it named W. H. Bridger, K. G. Drysdale, and C. T. Mold as having played. This is of note because it corroborates Mold's inclusion, as per scrum.com's listing, but also Bridger's inclusion as per Los Pumas, which itself excludes Mold. On the 1910 British Lions tour to Argentina there was a test against Argentina, but also a match against the Argentinos made up of Argentine born players. This may be where the differences lie, although only a contemporary team sheet will illuminate this.

== From 1927 ==
Argentina's International Rugby Players from 1927
Number	Name	Position	Date first cap obtained	Opposition
16	W. Braddon	wing	1927-07-31	v Great Britain XV at Buenos Aires
17	Enrique Bustamante	prop	1927-07-31	v Great Britain XV at Buenos Aires
18	Ray Cameron	prop	1927-07-31	v Great Britain XV at Buenos Aires
19	Jorge Conrard	hooker	1927-07-31	v Great Britain XV at Buenos Aires
20	Reginald Cooper	scrum-half	1927-07-31	v Great Britain XV at Buenos Aires
21	José Cuesta Silva	lock	1927-07-31	v Great Britain XV at Buenos Aires
22	Antonio Hobson	flanker	1927-07-31	v Great Britain XV at Buenos Aires
23	Fabio Lucioni	centre	1927-07-31	v Great Britain XV at Buenos Aires
24	Miguel McCormick	flanker	1927-07-31	v Great Britain XV at Buenos Aires
25	Antonio Pasalagua	no. 8	1927-07-31	v Great Britain XV at Buenos Aires
26	César Pollano	fullback	1927-07-31	v Great Britain XV at Buenos Aires
27	Arturo Rodríguez Jurado	centre	1927-07-31	v Great Britain XV at Buenos Aires
28	Rodolfo Serra	lock	1927-07-31	v Great Britain XV at Buenos Aires
29	César Vázquez	wing	1927-07-31	v Great Britain XV at Buenos Aires
30	Alberto Zappa	fly-half	1927-07-31	v Great Britain XV at Buenos Aires
31	Martín Ayerra	wing	1927-08-07	v Great Britain XV at Buenos Aires
32	Roberto Botting	flanker	1927-08-07	v Great Britain XV at Buenos Aires
33	G. E. F. Cooke	wing	1927-08-07	v Great Britain XV at Buenos Aires
34	Marco Hernández	fly-half	1927-08-07	v Great Britain XV at Buenos Aires
35	A. Jacobs	fullback	1927-08-07	v Great Britain XV at Buenos Aires
36	Carlos Reyes	centre	1927-08-07	v Great Britain XV at Buenos Aires
37	Alfredo Riganti	prop	1927-08-07	v Great Britain XV at Buenos Aires
38	Julian Sommer	no. 8	1927-08-07	v Great Britain XV at Buenos Aires
39	C. Derkheim	fullback	1927-08-14	v Great Britain XV at Buenos Aires
40	Norberto Escary	wing	1927-08-14	v Great Britain XV at Buenos Aires
41	Vicente Grimoldi	hooker	1927-08-14	v Great Britain XV at Buenos Aires
42	Llewellyn Makin	wing	1927-08-14	v Great Britain XV at Buenos Aires
43	Francisco Torino	fly-half	1927-08-14	v Great Britain XV at Buenos Aires
44	Salvador Muller	flanker	1927-08-21	v Great Britain XV at Buenos Aires
45	J. Bridger	scrum-half	1932-07-16	v Junior Springboks at Buenos Aires
46	Ernesto Cilley	prop	1932-07-16	v Junior Springboks at Buenos Aires
47	K. A. M. Cookson	lock	1932-07-16	v Junior Springboks at Buenos Aires
48	Roberto de Abelleyra	fullback	1932-07-16	v Junior Springboks at Buenos Aires
49	Carlos Echeverría	centre	1932-07-16	v Junior Springboks at Buenos Aires
50	Jumbo Francombe	prop	1932-07-16	v Junior Springboks at Buenos Aires
51	Carlos Huntley-Robertson	no. 8	1932-07-16	v Junior Springboks at Buenos Aires
52	Harald Maurer	wing	1932-07-16	v Junior Springboks at Buenos Aires
53	Adolfo Navajas	flanker	1932-07-16	v Junior Springboks at Buenos Aires
54	Edmundo Stanfield	fly-half	1932-07-16	v Junior Springboks at Buenos Aires
55	Jorge Stewart	lock	1932-07-16	v Junior Springboks at Buenos Aires
56	Norman Tozer	hooker	1932-07-16	v Junior Springboks at Buenos Aires
57	A. Turner	centre	1932-07-16	v Junior Springboks at Buenos Aires
58	Oscar Bernat	scrum-half	1932-07-23	v Junior Springboks at Buenos Aires
59	Antonio Lanusse	centre	1932-07-23	v Junior Springboks at Buenos Aires
60	Ian Lewis	flanker	1932-07-23	v Junior Springboks at Buenos Aires
61	Tomás Sanderson	fly-half	1932-07-23	v Junior Springboks at Buenos Aires
62	Hector Alfonso	fullback	1936-08-16	v Great Britain XV at Buenos Aires
63	Jorge Cilley	flanker	1936-08-16	v Great Britain XV at Buenos Aires
64	Noel Cooper	scrum-half	1936-08-16	v Great Britain XV at Buenos Aires
65	Riebeck Elliot	wing	1936-08-16	v Great Britain XV at Buenos Aires
66	José Frigoli	flanker	1936-08-16	v Great Britain XV at Buenos Aires
67	Virgilio Inchausti	hooker	1936-08-16	v Great Britain XV at Buenos Aires
68	Gilbert Logan	no. 8	1936-08-16	v Great Britain XV at Buenos Aires
69	Bernardo Mitchelstein	prop	1936-08-16	v Great Britain XV at Buenos Aires
70	Horacio Pascuali	centre	1936-08-16	v Great Britain XV at Buenos Aires
71	Tomás Salzman	lock	1936-08-16	v Great Britain XV at Buenos Aires
72	Emilio Schiavio	wing	1936-08-16	v Great Britain XV at Buenos Aires
73	Herbert Talbot	centre	1936-08-16	v Great Britain XV at Buenos Aires
74	Percy Talbot	fly-half	1936-08-16	v Great Britain XV at Buenos Aires
75	Eduardo Arriaga	fly-half	1936-09-20	v Chile at Valpariso
76	Archie Cameron	prop	1936-09-20	v Chile at Valpariso
77	Luis Hughes	wing	1936-09-20	v Chile at Valpariso
78	Walter Sutton	lock	1936-09-20	v Chile at Valpariso
79	José Tagliabue	prop	1936-09-20	v Chile at Valpariso
80	Raymond Wilkins	centre	1936-09-20	v Chile at Valpariso
81	Archie Ker	lock	1936-09-27	v Chile at Valpariso
82	Hector Pasman	fullback	1936-09-27	v Chile at Valpariso
83	Samuel Ratcliff	wing	1936-09-27	v Chile at Valpariso
84	Tomás Blades	flanker	1938-08-21	v Chile at Buenos Aires
85	Eric Buckley	wing	1938-08-21	v Chile at Buenos Aires
86	Keith Bush	centre	1938-08-21	v Chile at Buenos Aires
87	Jeronimo Cernegoy	fullback	1938-08-21	v Chile at Buenos Aires
88	P. H. Cox	lock	1938-08-21	v Chile at Buenos Aires
89	Douglas Hine	scrum-half	1938-08-21	v Chile at Buenos Aires
90	Ricardo Martín	flanker	1938-08-21	v Chile at Buenos Aires
91	Marcelo Pacheco	no. 8	1938-08-21	v Chile at Buenos Aires
92	J. Topping	prop	1938-08-21	v Chile at Buenos Aires
93	Matías Avellaneda	wing	1948-08-29	v Oxford and Cambridge at Buenos Aires
94	Juan de Pablo	wing	1948-08-29	v Oxford and Cambridge at Buenos Aires
95	Guillermo Ehrman	scrum-half	1948-08-29	v Oxford and Cambridge at Buenos Aires
96	Ricardo Follett	prop	1948-08-29	v Oxford and Cambridge at Buenos Aires
97	Ricardo Frigerio	fullback	1948-08-29	v Oxford and Cambridge at Buenos Aires
98	Ricardo Giles	fly-half	1948-08-29	v Oxford and Cambridge at Buenos Aires
99	Lucas Glastra	lock	1948-08-29	v Oxford and Cambridge at Buenos Aires
100	Bruno Grigolon	flanker	1948-08-29	v Oxford and Cambridge at Buenos Aires
101	Luis Maurette	lock	1948-08-29	v Oxford and Cambridge at Buenos Aires
102	Enrique Monpelat	centre	1948-08-29	v Oxford and Cambridge at Buenos Aires
103	Miguel Sarandon	no. 8	1948-08-29	v Oxford and Cambridge at Buenos Aires
104	Ronaldo Sharpe	prop	1948-08-29	v Oxford and Cambridge at Buenos Aires
105	Carlos Swain	hooker	1948-08-29	v Oxford and Cambridge at Buenos Aires
106	Normando Tompkins	flanker	1948-08-29	v Oxford and Cambridge at Buenos Aires
107	Prudencio Torres García	centre	1948-08-29	v Oxford and Cambridge at Buenos Aires
108	Horacio Achaval	hooker	1948-09-05	v Oxford and Cambridge at Buenos Aires
109	Juan Hardie	prop	1948-09-05	v Oxford and Cambridge at Buenos Aires
110	Ezequiel Holmberg	scrum-half	1948-09-05	v Oxford and Cambridge at Buenos Aires
111	A. Jones	centre	1948-09-05	v Oxford and Cambridge at Buenos Aires
112	Jaime O'Farrell	flanker	1948-09-05	v Oxford and Cambridge at Buenos Aires
113	Arturo Phillips	no. 8	1948-09-05	v Oxford and Cambridge at Buenos Aires
114	Jorge Sansot	centre	1948-09-05	v Oxford and Cambridge at Buenos Aires
115	Julian Santiago	wing	1948-09-05	v Oxford and Cambridge at Buenos Aires
116	Edmundo Caffarone	wing	1949-08-28	v France at Buenos Aires
117	Emilio Domínguez	lock	1949-08-28	v France at Buenos Aires
118	Luis Dorado	wing	1949-08-28	v France at Buenos Aires
119	Barry Holmes	fullback	1949-08-28	v France at Buenos Aires
120	Miguel Hughes	flanker	1949-08-28	v France at Buenos Aires
121	Pedro Macadam	centre	1949-08-28	v France at Buenos Aires
122	Carlos Orti	prop	1949-08-28	v France at Buenos Aires
123	Alfredo Palma	centre	1949-08-28	v France at Buenos Aires
124	Juan Petrone	prop	1949-08-28	v France at Buenos Aires
125	William Chiswell	wing	1949-09-04	v France at Buenos Aires
126	Emilio Dacharry	hooker	1949-09-04	v France at Buenos Aires
127	Leslie Allen	no. 8	1951-09-09	v Uruguay at Buenos Aires
128	Ricardo Bazán	centre	1951-09-09	v Uruguay at Buenos Aires
129	Desmond Farrell	wing	1951-09-09	v Uruguay at Buenos Aires
130	Enrique Fernández del Casal	centre	1951-09-09	v Uruguay at Buenos Aires
131	Marcelo Lanusse	prop	1951-09-09	v Uruguay at Buenos Aires
132	Carlos Morea	lock	1951-09-09	v Uruguay at Buenos Aires
133	José Morganti	lock	1951-09-09	v Uruguay at Buenos Aires
134	Uriel O'Farrell	wing	1951-09-09	v Uruguay at Buenos Aires
135	Ricardo Pont Lezica	prop	1951-09-09	v Uruguay at Buenos Aires
136	Horacio Solveyra	fullback	1951-09-09	v Uruguay at Buenos Aires
137	Isidro Comas	fly-half	1951-09-13	v Brazil at Buenos Aires
138	Alberto Conen	no. 8	1951-09-16	v Chile at Buenos Aires
139	Julio Genoud	fullback	1952-08-24	v Ireland XV at Buenos Aires
140	Rodolfo Grosse	flanker	1952-08-24	v Ireland XV at Buenos Aires
141	Gastón Recagno	centre	1952-08-31	v Ireland XV at Buenos Aires
142	Antonio Salinas	wing	1952-08-31	v Ireland XV at Buenos Aires
143	Osvaldo Bernacchi	wing	1954-08-29	v France at Buenos Aires
144	Victor Christianson	hooker	1954-08-29	v France at Buenos Aires
145	Eric Gahan	centre	1954-08-29	v France at Buenos Aires
146	Erwin Hirsch	prop	1954-08-29	v France at Buenos Aires
147	Michael Hughes	fly-half	1954-08-29	v France at Buenos Aires
148	Roberto Pineo	flanker	1954-08-29	v France at Buenos Aires
149	Bernardo Yustini	lock	1954-08-29	v France at Buenos Aires
150	Luis Bavio	no. 8	1954-09-12	v France at Buenos Aires
151	Osvaldo Elia	fullback	1954-09-12	v France at Buenos Aires
152	Jesus Loures	flanker	1954-09-12	v France at Buenos Aires
153	Oscar Martínez Basante	lock	1954-09-12	v France at Buenos Aires
154	Juan Manuel Belgrano	fly-half	1956-08-26	v Oxford and Cambridge at Buenos Aires
155	Malcolm Caldwell	hooker	1956-08-26	v Oxford and Cambridge at Buenos Aires
156	Ricardo Dell'Acqua	lock	1956-08-26	v Oxford and Cambridge at Buenos Aires
157	Juan Diez	lock	1956-08-26	v Oxford and Cambridge at Buenos Aires
158	Pedro Felisari	scrum-half	1956-08-26	v Oxford and Cambridge at Buenos Aires
159	Elias Gavina	prop	1956-08-26	v Oxford and Cambridge at Buenos Aires
160	Stanley Hogg	no. 8	1956-08-26	v Oxford and Cambridge at Buenos Aires
161	Roque Lagarde	prop	1956-08-26	v Oxford and Cambridge at Buenos Aires
162	Enrique Mitchelstein	flanker	1956-08-26	v Oxford and Cambridge at Buenos Aires
163	Roberto Ochoa	flanker	1956-08-26	v Oxford and Cambridge at Buenos Aires
164	Martín Azpiros	flanker	1956-09-16	v Oxford and Cambridge at Buenos Aires
165	Roberto Dillon	lock	1956-09-16	v Oxford and Cambridge at Buenos Aires
166	Ángel Guastella	fly-half	1956-09-16	v Oxford and Cambridge at Buenos Aires
167	Eamon Horan	wing	1956-09-16	v Oxford and Cambridge at Buenos Aires
168	Uriel Propato	scrum-half	1956-09-16	v Oxford and Cambridge at Buenos Aires
169	Pablo Yanguela	centre	1956-09-16	v Oxford and Cambridge at Buenos Aires
170	Carlos Álvarez	no. 8	1958-09-11	v Peru at Santiago
171	Carlos Ezcurra	hooker	1958-09-11	v Peru at Santiago
172	Juan Guidi	centre	1958-09-11	v Peru at Santiago
173	Ricardo Hogg	lock	1958-09-11	v Peru at Santiago
174	Enrique Holmgren	scrum-half	1958-09-11	v Peru at Santiago
175	Carlos Lennon	wing	1958-09-11	v Peru at Santiago
176	Luis Mendéz	centre	1958-09-11	v Peru at Santiago
177	Carlos Olivera	lock	1958-09-11	v Peru at Santiago
178	Raúl Pesce	fullback	1958-09-11	v Peru at Santiago
179	Eduardo Sorhaburu	prop	1958-09-11	v Peru at Santiago
180	Eduardo Verardo	prop	1958-09-18	v Chile at Santiago
181	Enrique Bianchetti	wing	1959-09-12	v Junior Springboks at Buenos Aires
182	Juan Casanegra	hooker	1959-09-12	v Junior Springboks at Buenos Aires
183	Carlos Giuliano	wing	1959-09-12	v Junior Springboks at Buenos Aires
184	Esteban Karplus	centre	1959-09-12	v Junior Springboks at Buenos Aires
185	Ricardo Raimundez	fullback	1959-09-12	v Junior Springboks at Buenos Aires
186	Rodolfo Devoto	fullback	1960-07-23	v France at Buenos Aires
187	Eduardo González del Solar	scrum-half	1960-07-23	v France at Buenos Aires
188	Enrique Krossler	wing	1960-07-23	v France at Buenos Aires
189	Enrico Neri	wing	1960-07-23	v France at Buenos Aires
190	Ricardo Oliveri	centre	1960-07-23	v France at Buenos Aires
191	Aitor Otano	lock	1960-07-23	v France at Buenos Aires
192	Jorge Pulido	flanker	1960-07-23	v France at Buenos Aires
193	Rodolfo Schmidt	lock	1960-07-23	v France at Buenos Aires
194	Florencio Varela	no. 8	1960-07-23	v France at Buenos Aires
195	Glauco Wessek	flanker	1960-07-23	v France at Buenos Aires
196	Cristobal Hirsch	prop	1960-08-06	v France at Buenos Aires
197	Jorge Ríos	fullback	1960-08-06	v France at Buenos Aires
198	Horacio Vidou	hooker	1960-08-06	v France at Buenos Aires
199	Walter Aniz	prop	1960-08-17	v France at Buenos Aires
200	John Vibart	flanker	1960-08-17	v France at Buenos Aires
201	Camilo Aldao	fullback	1961-10-07	v Chile at Montevideo
202	Hector Goti	wing	1961-10-07	v Chile at Montevideo
203	Jorge Lavayen	fly-half	1961-10-07	v Chile at Montevideo
204	Guillermo Montes de Oca	flanker	1961-10-07	v Chile at Montevideo
205	Martin Odriozola	hooker	1961-10-07	v Chile at Montevideo
206	Eduardo Scharemberg	no. 8	1961-10-07	v Chile at Montevideo
207	Luis Varela	lock	1961-10-07	v Chile at Montevideo
208	Adolfo Etchegaray	scrum-half	1964-08-15	v Uruguay at San Pablo
209	Nicanor González del Solar	hooker	1964-08-15	v Uruguay at San Pablo
210	José Lasalle	fullback	1964-08-15	v Uruguay at San Pablo
211	Raúl Loyola	no. 8	1964-08-15	v Uruguay at San Pablo
212	Mariano Molina Berro	fly-half	1964-08-15	v Uruguay at San Pablo
213	Miguel Puigdeval	flanker	1964-08-15	v Uruguay at San Pablo
214	Juan Queirolo	centre	1964-08-15	v Uruguay at San Pablo
215	Guillermo Schmitt	centre	1964-08-15	v Uruguay at San Pablo
216	Leopoldo Tahier	prop	1964-08-15	v Uruguay at San Pablo
217	Carlos Contepomi	fly-half	1964-08-19	v Brazil at San Pablo
218	Alejandro da Milano	lock	1964-08-19	v Brazil at San Pablo
219	Jorge Dartiguelongue	fullback	1964-08-19	v Brazil at San Pablo
220	Roberto Gallo	flanker	1964-08-19	v Brazil at San Pablo
221	Willie McCormick	prop	1964-08-19	v Brazil at San Pablo
222	Manuel Beccar Varela	fly-half	1965-05-08	v Zimbabwe at Harare
223	Juan Benzi	centre	1965-05-08	v Zimbabwe at Harare
224	Roberto Cazenave	fullback	1965-05-08	v Zimbabwe at Harare
225	Ronnie Foster	flanker	1965-05-08	v Zimbabwe at Harare
226	Luis García Yanez	prop	1965-05-08	v Zimbabwe at Harare
227	Guillermo Illia	lock	1965-05-08	v Zimbabwe at Harare
228	Marcelo Pascual	centre	1965-05-08	v Zimbabwe at Harare
229	Eduardo España	wing	1965-06-19	v Junior Springboks at Johannesburg
230	Eduardo Poggi	fly-half	1965-06-19	v Junior Springboks at Johannesburg
231	Arturo Rodríguez Jurado	centre	1965-06-19	v Junior Springboks at Johannesburg
232	Héctor Silva	flanker	1965-06-19	v Junior Springboks at Johannesburg
233	Luis Gradín	scrum-half	1965-09-11	v Oxford and Cambridge at Buenos Aires
234	Adrian Anthony	lock	1965-09-18	v Oxford and Cambridge at Buenos Aires
235	Eduardo Quetglas	wing	1965-09-26	v Chile at Santiago
236	Mario Bouza	flanker	1966-09-24	v South Africa Gazelles at Buenos Aires
237	Miguel Chesta	no. 8	1966-09-24	v South Africa Gazelles at Buenos Aires
238	Marcos Dumas	fullback	1966-09-24	v South Africa Gazelles at Buenos Aires
239	Ricardo Handley	hooker	1966-09-24	v South Africa Gazelles at Buenos Aires
240	Jose Imhoff	no. 8	1967-09-27	v Uruguay at Buenos Aires
241	Héctor Méndez	fly-half	1967-09-27	v Uruguay at Buenos Aires
242	Ronaldo Seaton	hooker	1967-09-27	v Uruguay at Buenos Aires
243	Alejandro Travaglini	centre	1967-09-27	v Uruguay at Buenos Aires
244	Mario Walther	wing	1967-09-27	v Uruguay at Buenos Aires
245	Dudley Morgan	fullback	1967-09-30	v Chile at Buenos Aires
246	Marcelo Farina	prop	1968-09-14	v Wales XV at Buenos Aires
247	Jorge Seaton	fullback	1968-09-14	v Wales XV at Buenos Aires
248	Néstor Pérez	wing	1968-09-28	v Wales XV at Buenos Aires
249	Tomés Harris-Smith	fly-half	1969-09-13	v Scotland XV at Buenos Aires
250	Hugo Miguens	flanker	1969-09-13	v Scotland XV at Buenos Aires
251	Arturo Abella	prop	1969-10-04	v Uruguay at Santiago
252	Néstor Carbone	no. 8	1969-10-04	v Uruguay at Santiago
253	Miguel Cutler	scrum-half	1969-10-04	v Uruguay at Santiago
254	Carlos Martínez	centre	1969-10-04	v Uruguay at Santiago
255	Julio Otaola	wing	1970-09-13	v Ireland XV at Buenos Aires
256	Guillermo Blacksley	scrum-half	1971-07-17	v South Africa Gazelles at Port Elizabeth
257	Ricardo Espagnol	fly-half	1971-07-17	v South Africa Gazelles at Port Elizabeth
258	Roberto Matarazzo	centre	1971-07-17	v South Africa Gazelles at Port Elizabeth
259	Jorge Wittman	flanker	1971-07-17	v South Africa Gazelles at Port Elizabeth
260	José Fernández	lock	1971-08-07	v South Africa Gazelles at Pretoria
261	Miguel Morgan	no. 8	1971-08-07	v South Africa Gazelles at Pretoria
262	Hugo Nicola	prop	1971-08-07	v South Africa Gazelles at Pretoria
263	José Costante	hooker	1971-08-28	v Oxford and Cambridge at Buenos Aires
264	Julio Walther	centre	1971-08-28	v Oxford and Cambridge at Buenos Aires
265	Guillermo Casas	(replacement)	1971-08-28	v Oxford and Cambridge at Buenos Aires
266	Jorge Carracedo	flanker	1971-10-10	v Chile at Montevideo
267	Rubén Castro	lock	1971-10-10	v Chile at Montevideo
268	Gustavo Foster	fullback	1971-10-10	v Chile at Montevideo
269	Fernando Insua	prop	1971-10-10	v Chile at Montevideo
270	Enrique Martínez	centre	1971-10-10	v Chile at Montevideo
271	Marcelo Martínez Mosquera	wing	1971-10-10	v Chile at Montevideo
272	Hugo Porta	fly-half	1971-10-10	v Chile at Montevideo
273	Marcelo Rodríguez Jurado	centre	1971-10-10	v Chile at Montevideo
274	Alberto Velásquez	flanker	1971-10-10	v Chile at Montevideo
275	Jorge Braceras	no. 8	1971-10-12	v Brazil at Montevideo
276	Gustavo Pimentel	centre	1971-10-12	v Brazil at Montevideo
277	Alejandro Altberg	wing	1972-10-21	v South Africa Gazelles at Buenos Aires
278	Eduardo Morgan	wing	1972-10-21	v South Africa Gazelles at Buenos Aires
279	Martín Alonso	fullback	1973-09-08	v Romania at Buenos Aires
280	Mario Carluccio	prop	1973-09-08	v Romania at Buenos Aires
281	Juan Dumas	hooker	1973-09-08	v Romania at Buenos Aires
282	José Virasoro	lock	1973-09-08	v Romania at Buenos Aires
283	Miguel Iglesias	flanker	1973-09-15	v Romania at Buenos Aires
284	Carlos Bottarini	lock	1973-10-14	v Paraguay at São Paulo
285	Roberto Fariello	prop	1973-10-14	v Paraguay at São Paulo
286	Martín Giargia	prop	1973-10-14	v Paraguay at São Paulo
287	Raúl Sanz	no. 8	1973-10-14	v Paraguay at São Paulo
288	Guillermo Pérez Leiros	wing	1973-10-20	v Brazil at São Paulo
289	Rito Iraneta	lock	1974-06-20	v France at Buenos Aires
290	Arturo Orzabal	prop	1974-06-20	v France at Buenos Aires
291	Osvaldo Rocha	hooker	1974-06-20	v France at Buenos Aires
292	Guillermo Álvarez	wing	1975-09-21	v Uruguay at Asunción
293	Eduardo Brouchou	wing	1975-09-21	v Uruguay at Asunción
294	Juan Cato	flanker	1975-09-21	v Uruguay at Asunción
295	Jorge Copello	fullback	1975-09-21	v Uruguay at Asunción
296	Felix d'Agnilo	flanker	1975-09-21	v Uruguay at Asunción
297	Miguel Devoto	fly-half	1975-09-21	v Uruguay at Asunción
298	Javier Escalante	centre	1975-09-21	v Uruguay at Asunción
299	Alejandro Iachetti	lock	1975-09-21	v Uruguay at Asunción
300	Tomás Landajo	scrum-half	1975-09-21	v Uruguay at Asunción
301	Roberto Lucke	no. 8	1975-09-21	v Uruguay at Asunción
302	Ernesto Miguens	prop	1975-09-21	v Uruguay at Asunción
303	Manuel Parra	lock	1975-09-21	v Uruguay at Asunción
304	Eduardo Sanguinetti	centre	1975-09-21	v Uruguay at Asunción
305	Rodolfo Ventura	prop	1975-09-21	v Uruguay at Asunción
306	Eduardo Vila	hooker	1975-09-21	v Uruguay at Asunción
307	Camilo Abud	prop	1975-09-25	v Paraguay at Asunción
308	Julio Bach	flanker	1975-09-25	v Paraguay at Asunción
309	Eduardo de Forteza	fly-half	1975-09-25	v Paraguay at Asunción
310	Buenaventura Minguez	lock	1975-09-25	v Paraguay at Asunción
311	Ricardo Muniz	centre	1975-09-25	v Paraguay at Asunción
312	Néstor Bozzo	hooker	1975-09-27	v Brazil at Asunción
313	Javier Capalbo	centre	1975-09-27	v Brazil at Asunción
314	Daniel Beccar Varela	wing	1975-10-19	v France at Lyon
315	Jorge Gauweloose	wing	1975-10-19	v France at Lyon
316	Ricardo Mastai	no. 8	1975-10-19	v France at Lyon
317	Carlos Neyra	flanker	1975-10-19	v France at Lyon
318	Martín Sansot	fullback	1975-10-19	v France at Lyon
319	Carlos Bori	flanker	1975-10-25	v France at Parc des Princes
320	Alejandro Cerioni	prop	1975-10-25	v France at Parc des Princes
321	Eliseo Branca	lock	1976-08-25	v Uruguay at Montevideo
322	Gonzalo Beccar Varela	centre	1976-10-16	v Wales XV at Cardiff
323	Adolfo Cappelletti	wing	1977-06-25	v France at Buenos Aires
324	Ricardo Castagna	scrum-half	1977-06-25	v France at Buenos Aires
325	Horacio Mazzini	no. 8	1977-06-25	v France at Buenos Aires
326	Fernando Bustillo	(replacement)	1977-06-25	v France at Buenos Aires
327	Luis Balfour	centre	1977-10-25	v Brazil at Tucumán
328	Alejandro Cubelli	hooker	1977-10-25	v Brazil at Tucumán
329	Eduardo García Teran	flanker	1977-10-25	v Brazil at Tucumán
330	Guillermo Morgan	wing	1977-10-25	v Brazil at Tucumán
331	Ricardo Passaglia	lock	1977-10-25	v Brazil at Tucumán
332	Javier Trucco	centre	1977-10-25	v Brazil at Tucumán
333	Agustín Badano	(replacement)	1977-10-25	v Brazil at Tucumán
334	Gabriel Allen	lock	1977-10-29	v Paraguay at Tucumán
335	Pablo Guarrochena	fly-half	1977-10-29	v Paraguay at Tucumán
336	Jorge Posse	hooker	1977-10-29	v Paraguay at Tucumán
337	Santos Rosatti	prop	1977-10-29	v Paraguay at Tucumán
338	Marcelo Campo	wing	1978-10-14	v England XV at Twickenham
339	Marcelo Loffreda	centre	1978-10-14	v England XV at Twickenham
340	Rafael Madero	centre	1978-10-14	v England XV at Twickenham
341	Tomás Petersen	flanker	1978-10-14	v England XV at Twickenham
342	Gabriel Travaglini	no. 8	1978-10-14	v England XV at Twickenham
343	Carlos Serrano	flanker	1978-10-24	v Italy at Rovigo
344	Alfredo Soares Gache	scrum-half	1978-10-24	v Italy at Rovigo
345	Marcos Iachetti	lock	1979-09-08	v New Zealand XV at Dunedin
346	Javier Pérez Cobo	hooker	1979-09-08	v New Zealand XV at Dunedin
347	Topo Rodríguez	prop	1979-09-08	v New Zealand XV at Dunedin
348	Ernesto Ure	flanker	1979-09-15	v New Zealand XV at Wellington
349	Fernando Argerich	fullback	1979-10-04	v Uruguay at Santiago
350	Andres Courreges	hooker	1979-10-04	v Uruguay at Santiago
351	Miguel Glastra	flanker	1979-10-04	v Uruguay at Santiago
352	Armando Memoli	lock	1979-10-04	v Uruguay at Santiago
353	Andrés Nicholson	scrum-half	1979-10-04	v Uruguay at Santiago
354	Guillermo Paz	flanker	1979-10-04	v Uruguay at Santiago
355	Carlos Ramallo	wing	1979-10-04	v Uruguay at Santiago
356	Carlos Sainz Trapaga	prop	1979-10-04	v Uruguay at Santiago
357	Guillermo Sanguinetti	fly-half	1979-10-04	v Uruguay at Santiago
358	Martín García Laborde	scrum-half	1979-10-06	v Chile at Santiago
359	Carlos Jacobi	centre	1979-10-06	v Chile at Santiago
360	Mario Negri	flanker	1979-10-06	v Chile at Santiago
361	Alejandro Puccio	wing	1979-10-06	v Chile at Santiago
362	Jaime Sartori	hooker	1979-10-06	v Chile at Santiago
363	Marcelo Dip	fly-half	1979-10-07	v Paraguay at Vina del Mar
364	Fernando Morel	prop	1979-10-27	v Australia at Buenos Aires
365	Daniel Baetti	(replacement)	1980-08-09	v World XV at Buenos Aires
366	Juan Pablo Piccardo	(replacement)	1981-06-06	v England at Buenos Aires
367	Jorge Allen	flanker	1981-10-03	v Canada at Buenos Aires
368	José Palma	(replacement)	1981-10-03	v Canada at Buenos Aires
369	Pablo Devoto	prop	1982-11-14	v France at Toulouse
370	Javier Miguens	scrum-half	1982-11-14	v France at Toulouse
371	Gustavo Milano	lock	1982-11-14	v France at Toulouse
372	Guillermo Varone	wing	1982-11-14	v France at Toulouse
373	Serafín Dengra	prop	1982-11-20	v France at Parc des Princes
374	Ricardo de Vedia	flanker	1982-11-20	v France at Parc des Princes
375	Bernardo Miguens	centre	1983-06-25	v World XV at Buenos Aires
376	Juan Aguilar	prop	1983-07-16	v Chile at Buenos Aires
377	Ricardo Annichini	wing	1983-07-16	v Chile at Buenos Aires
378	Eduardo Basile	scrum-half	1983-07-16	v Chile at Buenos Aires
379	Diego Cuesta Silva	centre	1983-07-16	v Chile at Buenos Aires
380	Sebastian Dassen	centre	1983-07-16	v Chile at Buenos Aires
381	Lucio de Chazal	hooker	1983-07-16	v Chile at Buenos Aires
382	Gonzalo Gasso	lock	1983-07-16	v Chile at Buenos Aires
383	Pedro Lanza	wing	1983-07-16	v Chile at Buenos Aires
384	Alejandro Schiavio	flanker	1983-07-16	v Chile at Buenos Aires
385	Alejandro Scolni	fullback	1983-07-16	v Chile at Buenos Aires
386	Marcos Baeck	no. 8	1983-07-20	v Paraguay at Buenos Aires
387	Marcelo Carrique	fullback	1983-07-20	v Paraguay at Buenos Aires
388	Carlos Cordeiro	prop	1983-07-20	v Paraguay at Buenos Aires
389	José Carlos Galvalisi	lock	1983-07-20	v Paraguay at Buenos Aires
390	Ricardo Sauze	fly-half	1983-07-20	v Paraguay at Buenos Aires
391	Eduardo Torello	scrum-half	1983-07-20	v Paraguay at Buenos Aires
392	Diego Cash	prop	1985-06-22	v France at Buenos Aires
393	Juan Lanza	wing	1985-06-22	v France at Buenos Aires
394	Fabián Turnes	centre	1985-06-22	v France at Buenos Aires
395	Fabio Gómez	scrum-half	1985-09-17	v Uruguay at Asunción
396	Rodrigo de la Arena	wing	1985-09-19	v Chile at Asunción
397	Pedro Merlo	scrum-half	1985-09-19	v Chile at Asunción
398	Luis Molina	prop	1985-09-19	v Chile at Asunción
399	Daniel Sanes	prop	1985-09-19	v Chile at Asunción
400	José Luis Visca	no. 8	1985-09-21	v Paraguay at Asunción
401	Guillermo Holmgren	scrum-half	1985-10-26	v New Zealand at Buenos Aires
402	Sergio Carossio	(replacement)	1985-11-02	v New Zealand at Buenos Aires
403	Eduardo Valesani	prop	1986-07-06	v Australia at Brisbane
404	Joaquín Uriarte	lock	1986-07-12	v Australia at Sydney
405	José Mostany	flanker	1987-05-03	v Uruguay at Montevideo
406	Sebastián Salvat	fullback	1987-05-03	v Uruguay at Montevideo
407	Martín Yangüela	scrum-half	1987-05-28	v Italy at Christchurch
408	Guillermo Angaut	fullback	1987-06-01	v New Zealand at Wellington
409	Pablo Garretón	flanker	1987-08-17	v Spain at Mar del Plata
410	Marcelo Ricci	no. 8	1987-08-17	v Spain at Mar del Plata
411	Juan José Angelillo	hooker	1987-09-27	v Uruguay at Santiago
412	Javier Caminotti	centre	1987-09-27	v Uruguay at Santiago
413	Roberto Cobelo	lock	1987-09-27	v Uruguay at Santiago
414	Julio Coria	prop	1987-09-27	v Uruguay at Santiago
415	Pablo Franchi	flanker	1987-09-27	v Uruguay at Santiago
416	Mario Gerosa	wing	1987-09-27	v Uruguay at Santiago
417	Cristian Mendy	wing	1987-09-27	v Uruguay at Santiago
418	Mario Carreras	no. 8	1987-09-30	v Paraguay at Santiago
419	Julio Clement	hooker	1987-09-30	v Paraguay at Santiago
420	Dardo González	prop	1987-09-30	v Paraguay at Santiago
421	Santiago Mesón	centre	1987-09-30	v Paraguay at Santiago
422	Hernan Vidou	(fly-half)	1987-09-30	v Paraguay at Santiago
423	Gabriel Teran Nougues	wing	1988-06-18	v France at Buenos Aires
424	Fernando Conti	flanker	1988-11-05	v France at Nantes
425	Federico Silvestre	scrum-half	1988-11-05	v France at Nantes
426	Miguel Bertranou	flanker	1989-06-24	v Italy at Buenos Aires
427	Marcelo Valesani	lock	1989-06-24	v Italy at Buenos Aires
428	Juan Soler Valls	(replacement)	1989-06-24	v Italy at Buenos Aires
429	Pablo Buabse	lock	1989-07-15	v New Zealand at Dunedin
430	Pablo di Nisio	flanker	1989-07-15	v New Zealand at Dunedin
431	Marcelo Righentini	wing	1989-07-29	v New Zealand at Wellington
432	Pablo Camerlinckx	no. 8	1989-10-08	v Brazil at Montevideo
433	Diego Halle	fly-half	1989-10-08	v Brazil at Montevideo
434	Gustavo Jorge	wing	1989-10-08	v Brazil at Montevideo
435	Federico Schacht	wing	1989-10-08	v Brazil at Montevideo
436	José Simes	lock	1989-10-08	v Brazil at Montevideo
437	Juan Coppola	centre	1989-10-10	v Chile at Montevideo
438	Diego Domínguez	fly-half	1989-10-10	v Chile at Montevideo
439	Christian Martin	prop	1989-10-12	v Paraguay at Montevideo
440	Sergio Bunader	no. 8	1989-11-08	v United States at Buenos Aires
441	Adrián Rocca	prop	1989-11-08	v United States at Buenos Aires
442	Javier Grondona	lock	1990-03-30	v Canada at Burnaby Lake
443	Ricardo Zanero	wing	1990-03-30	v Canada at Burnaby Lake
444	Matías Allen	centre	1990-06-16	v Canada at Buenos Aires
445	Pablo Garzon	fullback	1990-06-16	v Canada at Buenos Aires
446	Manuel Aguirre	prop	1990-08-04	v England at Buenos Aires
447	Rodrigo Crexell	scrum-half	1990-10-27	v Ireland at Lansdowne Road
448	Santiago Ezcurra	wing	1990-10-27	v Ireland at Lansdowne Road
449	Hernán García Simón	centre	1990-10-27	v Ireland at Lansdowne Road
450	Ricardo Le Fort	hooker	1990-10-27	v Ireland at Lansdowne Road
451	Germán Llanes	lock	1990-10-27	v Ireland at Lansdowne Road
452	Agustín Macome	no. 8	1990-10-27	v Ireland at Lansdowne Road
453	Federico Méndez Azpillaga	prop	1990-10-27	v Ireland at Lansdowne Road
454	Pedro Sporleder	lock	1990-10-27	v Ireland at Lansdowne Road
455	Lisandro Arbizu	(replacement)	1990-10-27	v Ireland at Lansdowne Road
456	Gonzalo Camardón	scrum-half	1990-11-03	v England at Twickenham
457	Emilio Ezcurra	flanker	1990-11-10	v Scotland at Murrayfield
458	Guillermo del Castillo	fullback	1991-07-06	v New Zealand at Buenos Aires
459	José Santamarina	flanker	1991-07-06	v New Zealand at Buenos Aires
460	Martín Terán	wing	1991-07-06	v New Zealand at Buenos Aires
461	Fernando Buabse	flanker	1991-09-21	v Uruguay at Buenos Aires
462	Rafael Bullrich	scrum-half	1991-09-21	v Uruguay at Buenos Aires
463	Juan Luis Damioli	flanker	1991-09-21	v Uruguay at Buenos Aires
464	Rodolfo Etchegoyen	lock	1991-09-21	v Uruguay at Buenos Aires
465	Lucas Herrera	wing	1991-09-21	v Uruguay at Buenos Aires
466	Martín Lanfranco	centre	1991-09-21	v Uruguay at Buenos Aires
467	Alejandro Marguery	centre	1991-09-21	v Uruguay at Buenos Aires
468	Federico Méndez	fly-half	1991-09-21	v Uruguay at Buenos Aires
469	Julio José Paz	hooker	1991-09-21	v Uruguay at Buenos Aires
470	Franco Rossi	no. 8	1991-09-21	v Uruguay at Buenos Aires
471	Guillermo Ugartemendia	lock	1991-09-21	v Uruguay at Buenos Aires
472	Marcelo Urbano	prop	1991-09-21	v Uruguay at Buenos Aires
473	Ariel Mammana	(replacement)	1991-09-21	v Uruguay at Buenos Aires
474	Eduardo Pittinari	(replacement)	1991-09-21	v Uruguay at Buenos Aires
475	Patricio Noriega	prop	1991-09-28	v Paraguay at Asunción
476	Alejandro Tolomei	wing	1991-09-28	v Paraguay at Asunción
477	Eduardo Laborde	centre	1991-10-04	v Australia at Llanelli
478	Mariano Bosch	(replacement)	1991-10-04	v Australia at Llanelli
479	Francisco Irarrázaval	flanker	1991-10-13	v Samoa at Pontypridd
480	Luis Criscuolo	fullback	1992-07-04	v France at Buenos Aires
481	Raúl Pérez	flanker	1992-07-04	v France at Buenos Aires
482	Normando Ferrari	no. 8	1992-09-26	v Spain at Buenos Aires
483	Eduardo Garbarino	hooker	1992-09-26	v Spain at Buenos Aires
484	Matías Roby	wing	1992-09-26	v Spain at Buenos Aires
485	Leandro Bouza	(replacement)	1992-09-26	v Spain at Buenos Aires
486	Gonzalo García Orsetti	flanker	1992-10-31	v Romania at Bucharest
487	Pablo Cremaschi	centre	1993-05-15	v Japan at Tucuman
488	Roberto Grau	prop	1993-05-15	v Japan at Tucuman
489	Sebastián Irazoqui	no. 8	1993-05-15	v Japan at Tucuman
490	Diego Silvetti	hooker	1993-05-15	v Japan at Tucuman
491	Martín Grau	(replacement)	1993-05-15	v Japan at Tucuman
492	Matías Corral	prop	1993-05-22	v Japan at Buenos Aires
493	Sebastian Paz Posse	hooker	1993-10-02	v Brazil at São Paulo
494	Cristián Viel	flanker	1993-10-02	v Brazil at São Paulo
495	Martín Viola	no. 8	1993-10-02	v Brazil at São Paulo
496	Eduardo García Hamilton	(replacement)	1993-10-02	v Brazil at São Paulo
497	Ivan Merlo	(replacement)	1993-10-02	v Brazil at São Paulo
498	Sergio Peretti	(replacement)	1993-10-02	v Brazil at São Paulo
499	Pablo Fernández Bravo	flanker	1993-11-06	v South Africa at Buenos Aires
500	Nicolás Fernández Miranda	scrum-half	1994-05-28	v United States at Long Beach
501	Rolando Martín	flanker	1994-05-28	v United States at Long Beach
502	Martín Pfister	wing	1994-10-08	v South Africa at Port Elizabeth
503	Francisco García	(replacement)	1994-10-08	v South Africa at Port Elizabeth
504	José Cilley	fly-half	1994-10-15	v South Africa at Johannesburg
505	Diego Albanese	wing	1995-03-04	v Uruguay at Buenos Aires
506	Nicolás Bossicovich	lock	1995-03-04	v Uruguay at Buenos Aires
507	Omar Hasan Jalil	(replacement)	1995-03-04	v Uruguay at Buenos Aires
508	Martín Lerga	(replacement)	1995-03-04	v Uruguay at Buenos Aires
509	Fernando del Castillo	centre	1995-03-10	v Canada at Buenos Aires
510	Agustín Pichot	scrum-half	1995-04-30	v Australia at Brisbane
511	Ezequiel Jurado	(replacement)	1995-04-30	v Australia at Brisbane
512	José Luna	wing	1995-09-24	v Paraguay at Asuncion
513	Omar Portillo	lock	1995-09-24	v Paraguay at Asuncion
514	Martín Sugasti	flanker	1995-09-24	v Paraguay at Asuncion
515	Roberto Petti	(replacement)	1995-09-24	v Paraguay at Asuncion
516	Pablo Bouza	no. 8	1996-06-08	v Uruguay at Montevideo
517	Carlos Promanzio	hooker	1996-06-08	v Uruguay at Montevideo
518	Mauricio Reggiardo	prop	1996-06-08	v Uruguay at Montevideo
519	Gustavo Rivero	prop	1996-06-08	v Uruguay at Montevideo
520	Facundo Soler	wing	1996-06-08	v Uruguay at Montevideo
521	Julian Legora	(replacement)	1996-06-22	v France at Buenos Aires
522	Octavio Bartolucci	wing	1996-09-14	v United States at Nepean
523	Ignacio Fernández Lobbe	flanker	1996-09-14	v United States at Nepean
524	Leandro Lobrauco	scrum-half	1996-09-14	v United States at Nepean
525	Martín Palou	lock	1996-09-14	v United States at Nepean
526	Gonzalo Quesada	fly-half	1996-09-14	v United States at Nepean
527	Martín Scelzo	prop	1996-09-14	v United States at Nepean
528	Eduardo Simone	centre	1996-09-14	v United States at Nepean
529	Roberto Travaglini	flanker	1996-09-14	v United States at Nepean
530	Federico Werner	prop	1996-09-14	v United States at Nepean
531	Christian Barrea	scrum-half	1996-09-18	v Uruguay at Hamilton
532	Diego Giannantonio	fullback	1996-09-18	v Uruguay at Hamilton
533	Mario Ledesma Arocena	hooker	1996-09-18	v Uruguay at Hamilton
534	José Orengo	centre	1996-09-18	v Uruguay at Hamilton
535	Tomás Solari	wing	1996-09-18	v Uruguay at Hamilton
536	Germán Aristide	(replacement)	1997-06-07	v England at Buenos Aires
537	Miguel Ruiz	(replacement)	1997-06-21	v New Zealand at Wellington
538	Alejandro Aguirre	hooker	1997-09-13	v Paraguay at Corrientes
539	Pablo Alexenicer	prop	1997-09-13	v Paraguay at Corrientes
540	Alejandro Allub	lock	1997-09-13	v Paraguay at Corrientes
541	Matías Brandi	fullback	1997-09-13	v Paraguay at Corrientes
542	Marcelo Carmona	flanker	1997-09-13	v Paraguay at Corrientes
543	Diego Gómez Coll	centre	1997-09-13	v Paraguay at Corrientes
544	Agustín Lopresti	prop	1997-09-13	v Paraguay at Corrientes
545	Juan Meabe	flanker	1997-09-13	v Paraguay at Corrientes
546	Facundo Rave	wing	1997-09-13	v Paraguay at Corrientes
547	Damián Rotondo	no. 8	1997-09-13	v Paraguay at Corrientes
548	Gustavo Verón	wing	1997-09-13	v Paraguay at Corrientes
549	Raúl Cano	(replacement)	1997-09-13	v Paraguay at Corrientes
550	Manuel Díaz	(replacement)	1997-09-13	v Paraguay at Corrientes
551	Andrés Irigoyen	(replacement)	1997-09-13	v Paraguay at Corrientes
552	Fernando Díaz Alberdi	prop	1997-09-27	v Uruguay at Montevideo
553	Juan Fernández Miranda	fly-half	1997-09-27	v Uruguay at Montevideo
554	Santiago Phelan	flanker	1997-09-27	v Uruguay at Montevideo
555	Camilo Boffelli	(replacement)	1997-09-27	v Uruguay at Montevideo
556	Hugo Cespedes	(replacement)	1997-09-27	v Uruguay at Montevideo
557	Guillermo Bernardi	hooker	1997-10-04	v Chile at Mendoza
558	Martín Durand	flanker	1997-10-04	v Chile at Mendoza
559	Leonardo Gravano	wing	1997-10-04	v Chile at Mendoza
560	Emiliano Mulieri	wing	1997-10-04	v Chile at Mendoza
561	Gastón Nazassi	lock	1997-10-04	v Chile at Mendoza
562	Nicolás Gómez	(replacement)	1997-10-04	v Chile at Mendoza
563	Federico Todeschini	(replacement)	1998-08-08	v Romania at Rosario
564	Manuel Contepomi	fullback	1998-08-15	v United States at Buenos Aires
565	Gabriel Bocca	prop	1998-09-15	v Japan at Tokyo
566	Ignacio Corleto	wing	1998-09-15	v Japan at Tokyo
567	Patricio Fuselli	fly-half	1998-09-15	v Japan at Tokyo
568	Pablo García Hamilton	centre	1998-09-15	v Japan at Tokyo
569	Rodrigo Roncero	prop	1998-09-15	v Japan at Tokyo
570	Rafael Silva	no. 8	1998-09-15	v Japan at Tokyo
571	Bernardo Stortoni	fullback	1998-09-15	v Japan at Tokyo
572	Daniel Villen	wing	1998-09-15	v Japan at Tokyo
573	Arturo Mimesi	(replacement)	1998-09-15	v Japan at Tokyo
574	Damián Rodríguez	(replacement)	1998-09-15	v Japan at Tokyo
575	Patricio Grande	wing	1998-10-03	v Paraguay at Asunción
576	Matías Lamas	hooker	1998-10-03	v Paraguay at Asunción
577	Martín Molina	centre	1998-10-03	v Paraguay at Asunción
578	Christian Ohanian	no. 8	1998-10-03	v Paraguay at Asunción
579	José Altube	(replacement)	1998-10-03	v Paraguay at Asunción
580	Rimas Álvarez Kairelis	(replacement)	1998-10-03	v Paraguay at Asunción
581	Julio García	(replacement)	1998-10-03	v Paraguay at Asunción
582	Alejandro Moreno	(replacement)	1998-10-03	v Paraguay at Asuncion
583	Eduardo Zapiola	(replacement)	1998-10-03	v Paraguay at Asuncion
584	Julio Brolese	no. 8	1998-10-10	v Chile at Santiago
585	Felipe Contepomi	centre	1998-10-10	v Chile at Santiago
586	Gerardo Lazcano Miranda	lock	1998-10-10	v Chile at Santiago
587	Ernesto Naveyra	(replacement)	1998-10-10	v Chile at Santiago
588	Matías Peri Brusa	(replacement)	1998-10-10	v Chile at Santiago
589	Martín Gaitán	centre	1998-10-17	v Uruguay at Buenos Aires
590	Gonzalo Longo Elia	(replacement)	1999-06-05	v Wales at Buenos Aires
591	Lucas Ostiglia	(replacement)	1999-06-05	v Wales at Buenos Aires
592	Agustín Canalda	hooker	1999-08-21	v Scotland at Murrayfield
593	Hugo Dande	no. 8	2001-05-19	v Uruguay at Kingston
594	Leopoldo de Chazal	prop	2001-05-19	v Uruguay at Kingston
595	Santiago González Bonorino	prop	2001-05-19	v Uruguay at Kingston
596	Gustavo Morlaes Oliver	lock	2001-05-19	v Uruguay at Kingston
597	José María Núñez Piossek	wing	2001-05-19	v Uruguay at Kingston
598	Leonardo Roldan	lock	2001-05-19	v Uruguay at Kingston
599	Juan José Villar	hooker	2001-05-19	v Uruguay at Kingston
600	Matías Albina	(replacement)	2001-05-19	v Uruguay at Kingston
601	Francisco Leonelli Morey	(replacement)	2001-05-19	v Uruguay at Kingston
602	Mariano Sambucetti	(replacement)	2001-05-19	v Uruguay at Kingston
603	Emiliano Bergamaschi	prop	2001-05-23	v United States at Hamilton
604	Pablo Cardinali	(replacement)	2001-05-23	v United States at Hamilton
605	Daniel Rodríguez	prop	2002-04-28	v Uruguay at Mendoza
606	Hernán Senillosa	centre	2002-04-28	v Uruguay at Mendoza
607	Alfonso Amuchastegui	(replacement)	2002-04-28	v Uruguay at Mendoza
608	Maximiliano Nannini	(replacement)	2002-04-28	v Uruguay at Mendoza
609	Juan Cruz Legora	scrum-half	2002-05-01	v Paraguay at Mendoza
610	Patricio Albacete	lock	2003-04-27	v Paraguay at Montevideo
611	Lucas Borges	wing	2003-04-27	v Paraguay at Montevideo
612	Germán Bustos	fly-half	2003-04-27	v Paraguay at Montevideo
613	Eusebio Guiñazú	prop	2003-04-27	v Paraguay at Montevideo
614	Juan Martín Hernández	fullback	2003-04-27	v Paraguay at Montevideo
615	Francisco Lecot	prop	2003-04-27	v Paraguay at Montevideo
616	Leonardo Ortiz	hooker	2003-04-27	v Paraguay at Montevideo
617	Martín Schusterman	flanker	2003-04-27	v Paraguay at Montevideo
618	Martín Rospide	(replacement)	2003-04-27	v Paraguay at Montevideo
619	Federico Cortopasso	hooker	2003-04-30	v Chile at Montevideo
620	Julio Freixas	centre	2003-04-30	v Chile at Montevideo
621	Federico Serra Miras	fullback	2003-04-30	v Chile at Montevideo
622	Santiago Sanz	flanker	2003-08-23	v United States at Buenos Aires
623	Francisco Bosch	fullback	2004-04-25	v Chile at Santiago
624	Pablo Henn	prop	2004-04-25	v Chile at Santiago
625	Federico Martín Aramburú	centre	2004-04-25	v Chile at Santiago
626	Ariel Castellina	(replacement)	2004-04-25	v Chile at Santiago
627	Federico Andrés Genoud	(replacement)	2004-04-25	v Chile at Santiago
628	Andrés Romagnoli	(replacement)	2004-04-25	v Chile at Santiago
629	Galo Álvarez Quiñones	prop	2004-04-28	v Uruguay at Santiago
630	Juan Martín Fernández Lobbe	no. 8	2004-04-28	v Uruguay at Santiago
631	Álvaro Galindo	flanker	2004-04-28	v Uruguay at Santiago
632	Lucio López Fleming	scrum-half	2004-04-28	v Uruguay at Santiago
633	Fernando Higgs	(replacement)	2004-04-28	v Uruguay at Santiago
634	Pablo Gómez Cora	wing	2004-06-26	v New Zealand at Hamilton
635	Santiago Artese	lock	2004-12-04	v South Africa at Buenos Aires
636	Augusto Petrilli	no. 8	2004-12-04	v South Africa at Buenos Aires
637	Gonzalo Tiesi	centre	2004-12-04	v South Africa at Buenos Aires
638	Marcos Ayerza	(replacement)	2004-12-04	v South Africa at Buenos Aires
639	Manuel Carizza	(replacement)	2004-12-04	v South Africa at Buenos Aires
640	Alberto Vernet Basualdo	(replacement)	2004-12-04	v South Africa at Buenos Aires
641	Miguel Avramovic	centre	2005-04-23	v Japan at Buenos Aires
642	Juan Manuel Leguizamón	flanker	2005-04-23	v Japan at Buenos Aires
643	Agustín Creevy	(replacement)	2005-04-23	v Japan at Buenos Aires
644	Jaime Arocena Mesones	lock	2005-05-08	v Chile at Santiago
645	Facundo Barni	no. 8	2005-05-08	v Chile at Santiago
646	Javier Belloto	flanker	2005-05-08	v Chile at Santiago
647	Agustín Costa Repetto	hooker	2005-05-08	v Chile at Santiago
648	Bruno Fabricio Cuezzo	prop	2005-05-08	v Chile at Santiago
649	Tomás de Vedia	wing	2005-05-08	v Chile at Santiago
650	Gaston Graco	fly-half	2005-05-08	v Chile at Santiago
651	Javier Irazusta	centre	2005-05-08	v Chile at Santiago
652	Román Miralles	fullback	2005-05-08	v Chile at Santiago
653	Horacio San Martín	centre	2005-05-08	v Chile at Santiago
654	Nicolás Vergallo	scrum-half	2005-05-08	v Chile at Santiago
655	Alejandro Bar	(replacement)	2005-05-08	v Chile at Santiago
656	Juan Martin Berberian Blanco	(replacement)	2005-05-08	v Chile at Santiago
657	Nicolas Carizza	(replacement)	2005-05-08	v Chile at Santiago
658	Jose Ignacio Correa	(replacement)	2005-05-08	v Chile at Santiago
659	Gaston de Robertis	(replacement)	2005-05-08	v Chile at Santiago
660	Genaro Fessia	no. 8	2005-05-15	v Uruguay at Buenos Aires
661	Facundo Borelli	(hooker)	2005-05-15	v Uruguay at Buenos Aires
662	Conrado Lopez Alonso	(centre)	2005-05-15	v Uruguay at Buenos Aires
663	Horacio Agulla	(replacement)	2005-12-03	v Samoa at Buenos Aires
664	Matías Cortese	(replacement)	2005-12-03	v Samoa at Buenos Aires
665	Sebastien Rondinelli	(replacement)	2005-12-03	v Samoa at Buenos Aires
666	Rafael Carballo	centre	2006-06-11	v Wales at Puerto Madryn
667	Pablo Gambarini	(replacement)	2006-06-17	v Wales at Buenos Aires
668	Esteban Lozada	(replacement)	2006-11-11	v England at Twickenham
669	Juan Gómez	(replacement)	2006-11-18	v Italy at Rome
670	Marcelo Bosch	fly-half	2007-06-09	v Italy at Mendoza
671	Alejandro Abadie	flanker	2007-12-15	v Chile at San Juan
672	Federico Amelong	wing	2007-12-15	v Chile at San Juan
673	Felipe Aranguren	lock	2007-12-15	v Chile at San Juan
674	Gabriel Ascárate	centre	2007-12-15	v Chile at San Juan
675	Gonzalo Begino	prop	2007-12-15	v Chile at San Juan
676	Agustín Guzmán	no. 8	2007-12-15	v Chile at San Juan
677	Francisco Merello	wing	2007-12-15	v Chile at San Juan
678	Ignacio Mieres	fly-half	2007-12-15	v Chile at San Juan
679	Sebastian Ponce	fullback	2007-12-15	v Chile at San Juan
680	James Stuart	lock	2007-12-15	v Chile at San Juan
681	Benjamín Urdapilleta	centre	2007-12-15	v Chile at San Juan
682	Francisco Albarracín	(scrum-half	2007-12-15	v Chile at San Juan
683	Alejandro Campos	(back-row)	2007-12-15	v Chile at San Juan
684	Ramiro del Busto	(fullback)	2007-12-15	v Chile at San Juan
685	Lucas González Amorosino	(fullback)	2007-12-15	v Chile at San Juan
686	Tomas Roan	(lock)	2007-12-15	v Chile at San Juan
687	Federico Rodríguez	(hooker)	2007-12-15	v Chile at San Juan
688	Lucas Barrera Oro	fullback	2008-05-31	v Uruguay at Montevideo
689	Felipe Bettolli	prop	2008-05-31	v Uruguay at Montevideo
690	Gonzalo Camacho	wing	2008-05-31	v Uruguay at Montevideo
691	Mauro Comuzzi	wing	2008-05-31	v Uruguay at Montevideo
692	Juan Ignacio Gauthier	centre	2008-05-31	v Uruguay at Montevideo
693	Francisco Gómez Kodela	prop	2008-05-31	v Uruguay at Montevideo
694	Juan Pablo Lagarrigue	lock	2008-05-31	v Uruguay at Montevideo
695	Rodrigo Maria	hooker	2008-05-31	v Uruguay at Montevideo
696	Leonardo Senatore	no. 8	2008-05-31	v Uruguay at Montevideo
697	Carlos Cáceres	(lock)	2008-05-31	v Uruguay at Montevideo
698	Ariel Hevia	(prop)	2008-05-31	v Uruguay at Montevideo
699	Álvaro Tejeda	hooker	2008-06-07	v Scotland at Rosario
700	Pedro Ledesma Arocena	(no. 8)	2008-06-28	v Italy at Cordoba
701	Alfredo Lalanne	(scrum-half)	2008-08-09	v South Africa at Johannesburg
702	Martín Bustos Moyano	wing	2008-11-08	v Chile at Santiago
703	Miguel de Achával	flanker	2008-11-08	v Chile at Santiago
704	Juan Pablo Estelles	centre	2008-11-08	v Chile at Santiago
705	Tomás Leonardi	no. 8	2008-11-08	v Chile at Santiago
706	Agustin Smidt	lock	2008-11-08	v Chile at Santiago
707	Esteban Bustillo	hooker	2008-11-08	v Chile at Santiago
708	Mauricio Guidone	(prop)	2008-11-08	v Chile at Santiago
709	Martín Landajo	scrum half	2008-11-08	v Chile at Santiago
710	Ignacio Pasman	(back-row)	2008-11-08	v Chile at Santiago
711	Juan Pablo Orlandi	prop	2008-11-08	v France at Marseille
712	Santiago Fernández	(wing)	2008-11-15	v Italy at Torino
713	Agustín Figuerola	(scrum-half)	2008-11-15	v Italy at Torino
714	Belisario Agulla	()	2009-09-20	v Chile at Montevideo
715	Lucas Alcacer	()	2009-09-20	v Chile at Montevideo
716	Rodrigo Bruno	()	2009-09-20	v Chile at Montevideo
717	Pedro Garzon	()	2009-09-20	v Chile at Montevideo
718	Santiago González Iglesias	()	2009-09-20	v Chile at Montevideo
719	Juan Imhoff	()	2009-09-20	v Chile at Montevideo
720	Benjamín Macome	()	2009-09-20	v Chile at Montevideo
721	Matias Narvaez	()	2009-09-20	v Chile at Montevideo
722	Santiago Piccaluga	()	2009-09-20	v Chile at Montevideo
723	Guillermo Roan	()	2009-09-20	v Chile at Montevideo
724	Facundo Vega	()	2009-09-20	v Chile at Montevideo
725	Francisco Cubelli	()	2009-09-20	v Chile at Montevideo
726	Ignacio Di Santi	()	2009-09-20	v Chile at Montevideo
727	Paolo Mac	()	2009-09-20	v Chile at Montevideo
728	Federico Merlo	()	2009-09-20	v Chile at Montevideo
729	Gabriel Pata Curello	()	2009-09-20	v Chile at Montevideo
730	Martín Rodríguez	centre	2009-11-14	v England at Twickenham
731	Leandro Pereyra	prop	2010-05-21	v Uruguay at Santiago
732	Matías Viazzo	centre	2010-05-21	v Uruguay at Santiago
733	Tomás Cubelli	(scrum-half)	2010-05-21	v Uruguay at Santiago
734	Marcos Lobato	(lock)	2010-05-21	v Uruguay at Santiago
735	Ramiro Pacheco	(prop)	2010-05-21	v Uruguay at Santiago
736	Luciano Proto	(hooker)	2010-05-21	v Uruguay at Santiago
737	Nicolás Sánchez	(centre)	2010-05-21	v Uruguay at Santiago
738	Rodrigo Báez	flanker	2010-05-21	v Uruguay at Santiago
739	Nahuel Tetaz	prop	2010-05-21	v Uruguay at Santiago
740	Mariano Galarza	(lock)	2010-06-12	v Scotland at Tucumán
741	Santiago Guzmán	(lock)	2010-06-19	v Scotland at Mar del Plata
742	Juan Figallo	(prop)	2010-06-26	v France at Velez Sársfield, Buenos Aires
743	Julio Farías Cabello	lock	2010-11-20	v France at Montpellier
744	José Basile	Flanker	2011-05-22	v Chile at Cataratas
745	Santiago Bottini	Wing	2011-05-22	v Chile at Cataratas
746	Tomás de la Vega	Flanker	2011-05-22	v Chile at Cataratas
747	Tomás Rosati	Fly-half/Centre	2011-05-22	v Chile at Cataratas
748	Hugo Schierano	Lock	2011-05-22	v Chile at Cataratas
749	Roberto Tejerizo	Prop	2011-05-22	v Chile at Cataratas
750	Federico Allogio	Lock	2011-05-22	v Chile at Cataratas
751	Nicolás Centurión	Flanker	2011-05-22	v Chile at Cataratas
752	Gastón Cortés	Prop	2011-05-22	v Chile at Cataratas
753	Benjamín Madero	Fly-half	2011-05-22	v Chile at Cataratas
754	Martín Maineri	Scrum-half	2011-05-22	v Chile at Cataratas
755	Ramiro Moyano	Wing	2011-05-22	v Chile at Cataratas
756	Fernando Luna	Wing	2011-05-22	v Chile at Cataratas
757	Walter Weiss	Centre	2011-05-22	v Chile at Cataratas
758	Tomás Baravalle	Hooker	2011-05-22	v Chile at Cataratas
759	Agustín Gosio	Wing	2011-10-02	v Georgia at Palmerston North
760	Tomás Vallejos	Lock	2011-10-02	v Georgia at Palmerston North
761	Lisandro Ahualli de Chazal	Flanker	2012-05-20	v Uruguay at Santiago
762	Valentín Cruz	Fly-half	2012-05-20	v Uruguay at Santiago
763	Martín García Veiga	Hooker	2012-05-20	v Uruguay at Santiago
764	Manuel Montero	Wing	2012-05-20	v Uruguay at Santiago
765	Matías Orlando	Centre	2012-05-20	v Uruguay at Santiago
766	Javier Ortega Desio	Lock	2012-05-20	v Uruguay at Santiago
767	Diego Palma	Wing	2012-05-20	v Uruguay at Santiago
768	Javier Rojas	Centre	2012-05-20	v Uruguay at Santiago
769	Stéfano Ambrosio	Centre	2012-05-20	v Uruguay at Santiago
770	Nicolás Azorín	Flanker	2012-05-20	v Uruguay at Santiago
771	Facundo Barrea	Wing	2012-05-20	v Uruguay at Santiago
772	César Fruttero	Lock	2012-05-20	v Uruguay at Santiago
773	Bruno Postiglioni	Prop	2012-05-20	v Uruguay at Santiago
774	Ignacio Sáenz Lancuba	Prop	2012-05-20	v Uruguay at Santiago
775	Germán Aráoz	Prop	2012-05-23	v Brazil at Santiago
776	Santiago Craig	Centre	2012-05-23	v Brazil at Santiago
777	Joaquín Tuculet	Fullback	2012-06-09	v Italy at San Juan
778	Andrés Bordoy	Hooker	2012-06-16	v France at Cordoba
779	Nahuel Lobo	Prop	2012-11-17	v France at Lille
780	Maximiliano Bustos	Prop	2012-11-24	v Ireland at Landsdowne Road
781	Juan Cappiello	Centre	2013-04-27	v Uruguay at Montevideo
782	Tomás Carrió	Fullback	2013-04-27	v Uruguay at Montevideo
783	Matías Díaz	Prop	2013-04-27	v Uruguay at Montevideo
784	Dan Isaack	Wing	2013-04-27	v Uruguay at Montevideo
785	Fidel Lamy	Flanker	2013-04-27	v Uruguay at Montevideo
786	Tomás Lavanini	Lock	2013-04-27	v Uruguay at Montevideo
787	Santiago Méndez	Scrum-half	2013-04-27	v Uruguay at Montevideo
788	Francisco Panessi	Flanker	2013-04-27	v Uruguay at Montevideo
789	Joaquín Paz	Centre	2013-04-27	v Uruguay at Montevideo
790	Sebastián Poet	Fly-half	2013-04-27	v Uruguay at Montevideo
791	Santiago Rocchia	Flanker	2013-04-27	v Uruguay at Montevideo
792	Germán Schulz	Wing	2013-04-27	v Uruguay at Montevideo
793	Santiago Álvarez	Centre	2013-04-27	v Uruguay at Montevideo
794	Tomás Borghi	Lock	2013-04-27	v Uruguay at Montevideo
795	Martín Chiappesoni	Flanker	2013-04-27	v Uruguay at Montevideo
796	Tomás Gilardón	Prop	2013-04-27	v Uruguay at Montevideo
797	Santiago Iglesias Valdez	Hooker	2013-04-27	v Uruguay at Montevideo
798	Pedro Imhoff	Scrum-half	2013-04-27	v Uruguay at Montevideo
799	Patricio Fernández	Fly-half	2013-05-01	v Chile at Montevideo
800	Santiago García Botta	Prop	2013-05-01	v Chile at Montevideo
801	Pablo Matera	Flanker	2013-05-01	v Chile at Montevideo
802	Joaquín Paz	Wing	2013-05-01	v Chile at Montevideo
803	Macario Villaluenga	Wing	2013-05-01	v Chile at Montevideo
804	Gonzalo Manso	Hooker	2013-05-01	v Chile at Montevideo
805	Santiago Cordero	Wing	2013-11-09	v England at Twickenham
806	Antonio Ahualli de Chazal	Flanker	2014-05-17	v Uruguay at Paysandu
807	Matías Alemanno	Lock	2014-05-17	v Uruguay at Paysandu
808	Jerónimo de la Fuente	Centre	2014-05-17	v Uruguay at Paysandu
809	Lucas Noguera Paz	Prop	2014-05-17	v Uruguay at Paysandu
810	Lucas Ponce	Lock	2014-05-17	v Uruguay at Paysandu
811	Felipe Ezcurra	Scrum-half	2014-05-17	v Uruguay at Paysandu
812	Julián Montoya	Hooker	2014-05-17	v Uruguay at Paysandu
813	Lucas Maguire	Flanker	2014-05-25	v Chile at Santiago
814	Ramiro Herrera	Prop	2014-06-07	v Ireland at Resistencia
815	Matías Moroni	Centre	2014-06-20	v Scotland at Cordoba
816	Juan Cruz Guillemaín	Lock	2014-11-08	v Scotland at Murrayfield
817	Facundo Isa	No. 8	2014-11-08	v Scotland at Murrayfield
818	Guido Petti	Lock	2014-11-14	v Italy at Genova
819	Tomás Lezana	Flanker	2014-11-22	v France at Stade de France
820	Gerónimo Albertario	Lock	2015-05-16	v Uruguay at Montevideo
821	Gregorio Del Petre	Scrum-half	2015-05-16	v Uruguay at Montevideo
822	Juan León Novillon	Fullback	2015-05-16	v Uruguay at Montevideo
823	Gonzalo Bertranou	Scrum-half	2015-05-23	v Paraguay at Asuncion
824	Manuel Plaza	Lock	2015-05-23	v Paraguay at Asuncion
825	Juan Pablo Socino	Centre	2015-07-25	v Australia at Mendoza
826	Felipe Arregui	Prop	2016-05-28	v Uruguay at Colonia del Sacramento
827	Lautaro Bávaro	Flanker	2016-05-28	v Uruguay at Colonia del Sacramento
828	Marcos Bollini	Scrum-half	2016-05-28	v Uruguay at Colonia del Sacramento
829	Facundo Bosch	Hooker	2016-05-28	v Uruguay at Colonia del Sacramento
830	Franco Brarda	Prop	2016-05-28	v Uruguay at Colonia del Sacramento
831	Sebastián Cancelliere	Wing	2016-05-28	v Uruguay at Colonia del Sacramento
832	Franco Cuaranta	Wing	2016-05-28	v Uruguay at Colonia del Sacramento
833	Joaquín Díaz Bonilla	Fly-half	2016-05-28	v Uruguay at Colonia del Sacramento
834	Ignacio Larrague	Lock	2016-05-28	v Uruguay at Colonia del Sacramento
835	Pedro Mercerat	Fullback	2016-05-28	v Uruguay at Colonia del Sacramento
836	Pedro Ortega	Lock	2016-05-28	v Uruguay at Colonia del Sacramento
837	Santiago Portillo	Flanker	2016-05-28	v Uruguay at Colonia del Sacramento
838	Cristian Bartoloni	Prop	2016-05-28	v Uruguay at Colonia del Sacramento
839	Eduardo Bello	Prop	2016-05-28	v Uruguay at Colonia del Sacramento
840	Bruno Devoto	Centre	2016-05-28	v Uruguay at Colonia del Sacramento
841	Tomás Granella	Centre	2016-05-28	v Uruguay at Colonia del Sacramento
842	Federico Lavanini	Lock	2016-05-28	v Uruguay at Colonia del Sacramento
843	Juan Manuel Lescano	Scrum-half	2016-05-28	v Uruguay at Colonia del Sacramento
844	Santiago Montagner	Flanker	2016-05-28	v Uruguay at Colonia del Sacramento
845	José Deheza	Flanker	2016-06-04	v Chile at Santiago
846	Facundo Gigena	Prop	2016-06-04	v Chile at Santiago
847	Gonzalo Gutiérrez Taboada	Fullback	2016-06-04	v Chile at Santiago
848	Enrique Pieretto	Prop	2016-06-04	v Chile at Santiago
849	Segundo Tuculet	Centre	2016-06-04	v Chile at Santiago
850	Sacha Casañas	Lock	2016-06-04	v Chile at Santiago
851	Marcos Kremer	Flanker	2016-09-10	v New Zealand at Hamilton
852	Emiliano Boffelli	Wing	2017-06-10	v England at San Juan
853	Bautista Delguy	Wing	2018-06-09	v Wales at San Juan
854	Javier Díaz	Prop	2018-06-09	v Wales at San Juan
855	Santiago Medrano	Prop	2018-06-09	v Wales at San Juan
856	Bautista Ezcurra	Centre/Fly-half	2018-06-23	v Scotland at Resistencia
857	Juan Cruz Mallía	Centre/Fullback	2018-06-23	v Scotland at Resistencia
858	Diego Fortuny	Hooker	2018-08-18	v South Africa at Durban
859	Juan Pablo Zeiss	Prop	2018-09-08	v New Zealand at Nelson
860	Rodrigo Bruni	Flanker	2018-11-10	v Ireland at Lansdowne Road
861	Lucio Sordoni	Prop	2018-11-10	v Ireland at Lansdowne Road
862	Mayco Vivas	Prop	2019-07-20	v New Zealand at Buenos Aires
863	Santiago Socino	Hooker	2019-07-27	v Australia at Brisbane
864	Lucas Mensa	Centre	2019-08-17	v South Africa at Pretoria
865	Santiago Carreras	Wing/Fullback	2019-08-17	v South Africa at Pretoria
866	Santiago Chocobares	Centre	2020-11-14	v New Zealand at Parramatta
867	Santiago Grondona	Flanker	2020-11-14	v New Zealand at Parramatta
868	Lucas Paulos	Lock	2020-11-28	v New Zealand at Newcastle
869	Domingo Miotti	Fly-half	2020-12-05	v Australia at Parramatta
870	Francisco Gorrissen	Flanker	2020-12-05	v Australia at Parramatta
871	Juan Martín González	Flanker	2021-07-03	v Romania at Bucharest
872	Carlos Muzzio	Prop	2021-08-14	v South Africa at Port Elizabeth
873	Ignacio Mendy	Wing	2021-08-21	v South Africa at Port Elizabeth
874	Lucio Cinti	Centre	2021-08-21	v South Africa at Port Elizabeth
875	Gonzalo García	Scrum-half	2021-08-21	v New Zealand at Gold Coast
876	Rodrigo Martínez	Prop	2021-09-25	v Australia at Townsville
877	Mateo Carreras	Wing	2021-09-25	v Australia at Townsville
878	Joaquín Oviedo	Flanker	2021-09-25	v Australia at Townsville
879	Thomas Gallo	Prop	2021-10-02	v Australia at Gold Coast
880	Ignacio Calles	Prop	2021-11-13	v Italy at Treviso
881	Facundo Cordero	Wing/Fullback	2021-11-21	v Ireland at Lansdowne Road
882	Joel Sclavi	Prop	2022-07-02	v Scotland at Jujuy
883	Lautaro Bazán Vélez	Scrum-half	2022-07-16	v Scotland at Santiago del Estero
884	Ignacio Ruiz	Hooker	2022-07-16	v Scotland at Santiago del Estero
885	Tomás Albornoz	Fly-half	2022-08-06	v Australia at Mendoza
886	Pedro Rubiolo	Flanker	2022-09-24	v South Africa at Durban
887	Eliseo Morales	Scrum-half	2022-11-12	v Wales at Cardiff
888	Rodrigo Isgró	Wing	2023-07-15	v Australia at Parramatta
889	Martín Bogado	Fullback/Wing	2023-08-05	v South Africa at Buenos Aires
890	Franco Molina		2024-07-06	v England at Mendoza
891	Juan Bautista Pedemonte		2024-07-06	v England at Mendoza
