= 2013 IRB Nations Cup =

Tournament details
- Countries: Argentina XV; Italy A Romania; Russia
- Tournament format(s): Round-robin
- Date: 8 – 16 June 2013

Tournament statistics
- Teams: 4
- Matches played: 6
- Attendance: 7,000 (1,167 per match)
- Tries scored: 22 (3.67 per match)
- Top point scorer(s): Florin Vlaicu (Romania) (51 points)
- Top try scorer(s): Cătălin Fercu (Romania) (3 tries)

Final
- Champions: Romania (2nd title)
- Runners-up: Italy A

The 2013 IRB Nations Cup was the eighth edition of the international rugby union tournament, a competition created by the International Rugby Board. For the seventh time in a row, it was held in Bucharest, Romania. It was played between 8 June and 16 June and ran alongside the 2013 IRB Tbilisi Cup in Georgia. All fixtures were played at the 5,000 capacity Stadionul Naţional de Rugby, the Home stadium for Hosts Romania.

Hosts Romania were joined by ENC side Russia and regular A sides Italy A and 2012 IRB Nations cup runners-up, Argentina Jaguars.

Romania retained the title they won in 2012 by winning all three of their matches.

== Standings ==
	Team	Played	Won	Drawn	Lost	Points For	Points Against	Points Difference	Tries For	Tries Against	Try Bonus	Losing Bonus	Points
1	Romania	3	3	0	0	86	41	45	8	4	0	0	12
2	Italy A	3	2	0	1	66	51	15	5	3	0	0	8
3	Argentina XV	3	1	0	2	44	73	-29	4	7	0	0	4
4	Russia	3	0	0	3	56	87	-31	5	8	0	0	0
Source : www.irb.com Points breakdown: *4 points for a win *2 points for a draw *1 bonus point for a loss by seven points or less *1 bonus point for scoring four or more tries in a match

== Fixtures ==
=== Matchday 1 ===
8 June 2013
18:00 EET (UTC+2)

Romania	30 – 20	Russia
Try: Matei 21' c Fercu 24' c Macovei 42' c Con: Vlaicu (3/3); Pen: Vlaicu (3/3) 13', 53', 78'	ESPN; IRB	Try: Kurashov 4' c Kushnarev 17' c Con: Kushnarev (2/2); Pen: Kushnarev (2/3) 38', 51'

Attendance: 1,000
Referee: Joaquín Montes (URU)

8 June 2013
20:00 EET (UTC+2)

Argentina XV	6 – 26	Italy A
Pen: Poet (2/4) 12', 40'	ESPN; IRB	Try: Ruffolo (2) 10' c, 20' c Con: Ambrosini (2/2); Pen: Ambrosini (3/4) 38', 48', 80'; Drop: Ambrosini (1/1) 15'

Attendance: 1,000
Referee: Neil Patterson (SRU)

=== Matchday 2 ===
12 June 2013
18:00 EET (UTC+2)

Romania	30 – 8	Argentina XV
Try: Popârlan 40' c Macovei 53' c Vlaicu 80' c Con: Vlaicu (3/3); Pen: Vlaicu (3/5) 5', 20', 59'	ESPN; IRB	Try: Isaack 79' m Pen: Taboada (1/1) 16'

Referee: Claudio Blessano (FIR)

12 June 2013
20:00 EET (UTC+2)

Russia	19 – 27	Italy A
Try: Sugrobov 75' c Con: Kushnarev (1/1); Pen: Kushnarev (4/4) 4', 15', 27', 35'	ESPN; IRB	Try: Castagnoli 38' c Ragusi 79' m Con: Ragusi (1/2); Pen: Ragusi (5/6) 6', 24', 36', 42', 62'

Referee: Neil Patterson (SRU)

=== Matchday 3 ===
16 June 2013
19:00 EET (UTC+2)

Argentina XV	30 – 17	Russia
Try: Villaluenga 8' c Cappiello 36' c Bruno 76' c Con: Poet (2/2); Bonilla (1/1); Pen: Poet (1/1) 31'; Bonilla (2/2) 60', 63'	ESPN; IRB	Try: Kotov 23' c Sugrobov 72' c Con: Kushnarev (2/2); Pen: Kushnarev (1/1) 52'

Attendance: 6,000
Referee: Claudio Blessano (FIR)

16 June 2013
21:00 EET (UTC+2)

Romania	26 – 13	Italy A
Try: Fercu 23' c, 78' c Con: Vlaicu (2/2); Pen: Vlaicu (4/6) 27', 35', 52', 71'	ESPN; IRB	Try: Pratichetti 28' c Con: Ambrosini (1/1); Pen: Ambrosini (2/5) 18', 32'

Attendance: 6,000
Referee: Joaquín Montes (URU)

== Top scorers ==
=== Top points scorers ===
Rank	Player	Team	Points
1	Florin Vlaicu	Romania	51
2	Yury Kushnarev	Russia	36
3	James Ambrosini	Italy A	24
4	Simone Ragusi	Italy A	22
5	Cătălin Fercu	Romania	15
6	Sebastián Poet	Argentina XV	13
7	Mihai Macovei	Romania	10
7	Edoardo Ruffolo	Italy A	10
9	Joaquin Diaz Bonilla	Argentina XV	8

=== Top try scorers ===
Rank	Player	Team	Tries
1	Cătălin Fercu	Romania	3
2	Mihai Macovei	Romania	2
2	Edoardo Ruffolo	Italy A	2
4	15 players		1

== See also ==
- 2013 IRB Pacific Nations Cup
- 2013 IRB Tbilisi Cup
