= 1990 Argentina rugby union tour of British Isles =

Summary
P	W	D	L
Total
8	4	0	4
Test match
3	0	0	3
Opponent
P	W	D	L
Ireland
1	0	0	1
Scotland
1	0	0	1
England
1	0	0	1

The 1990 Argentina rugby union tour of British Isles was a series of eight matches played by the Argentina national rugby union team in October and November 1990. It was the first time that the Pumas played the Ireland and Scotland senior national teams, whereas they had previously played the England senior teams at Buenos Aires in 1981 and 1990.

== Matches ==
20 October 1990

Ireland B	27–12	Argentina XV
Try: Riordan, Galwey; Bradley, Geoghegan; Con: Barry; Pen: Barry 3		Try: Scolni; Con: Porta; Pen: Porta 2

Thomond Park, Limerick
Referee: Clayton Thomas (Wales)

IRELAND "B": Wilkinson; Riordan, Clarke, Cunningham, Geoghegan; Barry, Bradley (capt.); Fitzgerald Kingston, Halpin; Potts, McBride; Lawlor, Lehay, Galwey.
ARGENTINA: A. Scolni; R. Romero Acuña, D. Cuesta Silva, S. Mesón, S. Ezcurra; H. Porta (capt.), G. Camardón; P. Garretón, A. Macome, E. Ezcurra; G. Llanes, J. Simes (33' F. Méndez); H. Ballatore, A. Cubelli, L. Lonardi (red card) 33'.

23 October 1990

Irish Student	6–23	Argentina XV
Try: penalty try Con: Barry		Try: Allen, Vidou; Jorge; Con: Vidou; Pen: Vidou 3

Mardyke Park, Cork
Referee: Tony Spreadbury (England)

IRISH STUDENTS: Hewitt; O’Dowd, Tormey, Glennon, Furlong; Barry, McIvor; Sheehan, Cronin, Devlin; O'Driscoll, O'Callaghan; Ward, Kenny, Leslie.
ARGENTINA: G. Angaut (capt.); H. Vidou, M. Allen, H. García Simón, G. Jorge; L. Arbizu, R. Crexell; R. Villalonga, A. Macome, M. Bertranou; O. Fascioli (66' : J. Simes), P. Sporleder; H. Ballatore, R. Le Fort, F. Méndez.

27 October 1990

Ireland	20–18	Argentina
Try: Hooks, Kiernan; Pen: Kiernan 4		Try: Macome; Con: Porta; Pen: Porta 4

Landsdowne Road, Dublin
Referee: Colin Hawke (New Zealand)

Ireland			Argentina
Kenny Murphy	FB	15	FB	Alejandro Scolni
Kenneth Hooks	W	14	W	Santiago Ezcurra
(substituted off) 79' Brendan Mullin	C	13	C	Diego Cuesta Silva
Michael Kiernan	C	12	C	Hernan Garcia Simon (substituted off) 68'
Keith Crossan	W	11	W	Gustavo Jorge
Brian Smith	FH	10	FH	Hugo Porta (capt.)
Alain Rolland	SH	9	SH	Rodrigo Crexell
Philip Lawlor	N8	8	N8	Agustin Macome
Denis McBride	F	7	F	Miguel Bertranou
Noel Mannion	F	6	F	Pablo Garreton
Paddy Johns	L	5	L	Pedro Sporleder
Donal Lenihan	L	4	L	Germán Llanes
Des Fitzgerald	P	3	P	Diego Cash
John McDonald	H	2	H	Ricardo le Fort
Nick Popplewell	P	1	P	Federico Méndez
		Replacements
(substituted on) 79' Vince Cunningham	C		FH	Lisandro Arbizu (substituted on) 68'

30 October 1990

Eastern Counties	15–28	Argentina XV
Try: Summer; Con: King; Pen: King 3		Try: Allen, Vidou; Con: Vidou; Pen: Vidou 4 Drop: Arbizu 2

Grange Road Stadium, Cambridge
Referee: Don Leslie (Scotland)

EASTERN COUNTIES: P. Larkin; R. Norcano, M. Thompson, I. Fox, R. Summer; J. King, B. Davies; R. Emblem (capt.), M. Pinnegar; G. Atherton (65' Easton); C. Pinnegar, M. Upex; W. Hallett, C. Newman, N. Prentice.
ARGENTINA: G. Angaut (capt.); G. Romero Acuña, S. Mesón, M. Allen, H. Vidou; L. Arbizu, G. Camardón; E. Ezcurra, R. Etchegoyen, R. Villalonga; P. Fascioli, J. Simes; H. Ballatore, A. Cubelli, M. Aguirre.

3 November 1990

England	51–0	Argentina
Try: Guscott 2, Hall; Hill, Underwood 3 Con: Hodgkinson 7 Pen: Hodgkinson 3	report

Twickenham, London
Referee: Colin Hawke (New Zealand)

England			Argentina
Simon Hodgkinson	FB	15	FB	Alejandro Scolni
Nigel Heslop	W	14	W	Santiago Ezcurra
(capt.) Will Carling	C	13	C	Diego Cuesta Silva
Jerry Guscott	C	12	C	Matias Allen
Rory Underwood	W	11	W	Gustavo Jorge
Rob Andrew	FH	10	FH	Hugo Porta (capt.)
Richard Hill	SH	9	SH	Gonzalo Camardón
Dean Richards	N8	8	N8	Agustin Macome
Peter Winterbottom	F	7	F	Miguel Bertranou
Jon Hall	F	6	F	Pablo Garreton
(substituted off) 71' Paul Ackford	L	5	L	Pedro Sporleder
Wade Dooley	L	4	L	German Llanes
Jeff Probyn	P	3	P	Diego Cash
John Olver	H	2	H	Ricardo le Fort
Jason Leonard	P	1	P	Federico Méndez (red card) 69'
		Replacements
(substituted on) 71' Gary Rees	L

6 November 1990

South of Scotland	10–13	Argentina XV
Try: P. Oliver; Pen: P. Dodds 2		Try: Angaut; Pen: Mesón 2 Drop: Arbizu

Pynder Park, Kelso
Referee: A. Hitchick (Ireland)

SOUTH OF SCOTLAND: P. Dodds; H. Hogg, M. Wright, C. Redpath, M. Moncrieff; G. Shiel, G. Oliver; N. Ferguson, H. Hay, N. McIlroy; J. Laing, C. Hogg; A. Roxburgh, R. Kirpatrick; K. Armstrong.
ARGENTINA: G. Angaut (capt.); D. Cuesta Silva, S. Mesón, M. Allen, G. Jorge; L. Arbizu, R. Crexell; E. Ezcurra, R. Etchegoyen (57' M. Bertranou), R. Villalonga; O. Fascioli (35' J. Simes), G. Llanes; D. Cash, A. Cubelli, M. Aguirre.

10 November 1990

Scotland	49–3	Argentina
Try: Armstrong, Chalmers; Gray, AG Hastings; KS Milne 2, Moore; Stanger 2 Con: G. Hastings 5 Pen: G. Hastings		Pen: Meson

Murrayfield, Edinburgh
Referee: Freek Burger (South Africa)

Scotland			Argentina
Gavin Hastings	FB	15	FB	Guillermo Angaut
Tony Stanger	W	14	W	Diego Cuesta Silva
Scott Hastings	C	13	C	Lisandro Arbizu
Sean Lineen	C	12	C	Santiago Meson
Alex Moore	W	11	W	Matias Allen
Craig Chalmers	FH	10	FH	Hugo Porta (capt.) (substituted off) 16'
Gary Armstrong	SH	9	SH	Rodrigo Crexell
Graham Marshall	N8	8	N8	Miguel Bertranou
George Buchanan-Smith	F	7	F	Emilio Ezcurra
John Jeffrey	F	6	F	Pablo Garreton
Doddie Weir	L	5	L	Pedro Sporleder
Chris Gray	L	4	L	German Llanes
Paul Burnell	P	3	P	Diego Cash
Kenny Milne	H	2	H	Alejandro Cubelli
David Sole (c)	P	1	P	Manuel Aguirre
		Replacements
			FH	Alejandro Scolni (substituted on) 16'

17 November 1990

Barbarians	34–22	Argentina XV
Try: Crossan 2, Evans; Chalmers, R.Jones; Con: Hodgkinson 4 Pen: Hodgkinson 2		Try: Cuesta Silva, Mesón; Penalty try Con: Mesón 2 Pen: Mesón 2

National Stadium, Cardiff
Referee: Jim Fleming (Scotland)

Barbarians: Simon Hodgkinson; Ieuan Evans, Craig Innes, Mark Ring, Keith Crossan; Craig Chalmers, Robert Jones (capt.); Gareth Rees, Phil Davies, Richard Webster; Chris Gray, Ian Jones; P. Knight, T. Kingston, L. Hullena.
Argentina: G. Angaut (capt.); D. Cuesta Silva, S. Mesón, M. Allen, G. Jorge; L. Arbizu, G. Camardón; R. Villalonga, R. Etchegoyen, P. Garretón (34' A. Macome); P. Sporleder, G. Llanes; D. Cash, R. Le Fort, M. Aguirre.

== Sources ==
- "MEMORIA Temporada año 1990" (.doc) (in Spanish). Union Argentina de Rugby. December 1990.
