= Henry Talbot =

Henry Talbot may refer to:

- Henry Talbot (cricketer) (1863–1911), English cricketer
- Henry Talbot of Templeogue, Irish landowner of the 17th century
- Henry Talbot (photographer) (1920–1999), German-Australian fashion photographer
- Henry Talbot (rugby union), Argentine rugby player
- Henry Fox Talbot (1800–1877), British scientist, inventor and photography pioneer
- Henry Paul Talbot (1864–1927), American chemist
