= Gebbie =

Gebbie is a surname. Notable people with the surname include:

- Bert Gebbie (born 1934), Scottish former professional footballer
- Edene Gebbie (born 1995), Papua New Guinean rugby league footballer
- Frederick Gebbie (1871–1939), British civil engineer
- George Gebbie (1832–1892), Scottish American publisher
- Katharine Gebbie (1932–2016), American astrophysicist and civil servant
- Kristine Gebbie (born 1943), American academic and public health official
- Luke Gebbie (born 1996), Filipino Olympic swimmer
- Melinda Gebbie, American writer
- Oswald Gebbie (1878–1956), Argentine rugby union footballer
