= Nicanor González del Solar =

Argentine rugby union player (born 1943)

- Born: December 24, 1943 (age 82) Buenos Aires, Argentina

Rugby union career
- Position: Hooker
Amateur team(s)
Years	Team	Apps	(Points)
- CASI
International career
Years	Team	Apps	(Points)
1964-1965	Argentina		

Nicanor González del Solar (born December 24, 1943) is an Argentine sports journalist and former rugby union player. He was part of the Argentina national team than toured South Africa in 1965 achieving a historic victory over the Junior Springboaks.

== Career ==
González del Solar began his career playing for Club Atlético San Isidro where he played throughout his career.

Del Solar played his first test match for the national team against Uruguay, during the 1964 South American Rugby Championship. He won the South American title, when playing the last match against Chile. On August 22, 1964, in the city of São Paulo, Argentina beat Chile by 30-0.

The biggest game of his life was against South Africa, on July 19, 1965, in the Ellis Park Stadium, the Argentine team had played against Springboks, in the historic victory of Argentina by 11-6.

Nicanor González del Solar was the first journalist to report on rugby match from the outside of Argentina. He covered all world rugby championships, the Barcelona Olympics, Atlanta, Sydney, Athens, and the Pan American Games of 1995, 1999, and 2007.

== Titles ==
=== Club ===
C.A. San Isidro

- Torneo de la URBA (3): 1962, 1964, 1967

=== National team ===
Argentina

- South American Rugby Championship (1): 1964
