= Ruffolo =

Ruffolo is a surname of Italian origin. Notable people with the surname are as follows:

- Edoardo Ruffolo (born 1991), Italian rugby union player
- Giorgio Ruffolo (1926–2023), Italian economist, journalist and politician
- Robert R. Ruffolo Jr. (born 1950), American pharmacologist
