= Gonzalo Manso =

Argentine rugby union player (born 1990)

- Full name: Gonzalo Manso Moyano
- Born: 4 May 1990 (age 36) Tucumán, Argentina
- Height: 5 ft 11 in (180 cm)
- Weight: 231 lb (105 kg)

Rugby union career
- Position: Hooker
International career
Years	Team	Apps	(Points)
2013	Argentina	2	(0)

Gonzalo Manso Moyano (born 4 May 1990) is an Argentine professional rugby union player.

A former Tucumán hooker, Manso was capped twice for Argentina in 2013, playing internationals against Chile and Brazil in Montevideo. He left Argentine rugby in 2017 to play professionally in France.

Manso helped Bassin D'Arcachon gain promotion to Féderale 1 in his first season in France and then moved on to Tarbes Pyrenees, where he played from 2017–18 to 2018–19. Since 2021, Manso has played with CA Lannemezan.

== See also ==
- List of Argentina national rugby union players
