= Guillermo Mc Cormick =

Argentine rugby union player (1938–2005)

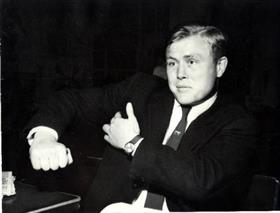
- Mc Cormick in 1965
- Born: Guillermo Eduardo Mc Cormick; October 7, 1938 Buenos Aires, Argentina
- Died: August 29, 2005 (aged 66) Buenos Aires, Argentina

Rugby union career
- Position: Forwards
Amateur team(s)
Years	Team	Apps	(Points)
1959-1969	Belgrano A.C.		
International career
Years	Team	Apps	(Points)
1965-1965	Argentina		

Guillermo Mc Cormick (1938–2005) was an Argentine rugby union player. His position on the field was prop. Mc Cormick's entire career was in Belgrano Athletic Club, having also played for the Argentina national team. In 1965, was part in the historic tour by Rhodesia and South Africa.

== Career ==
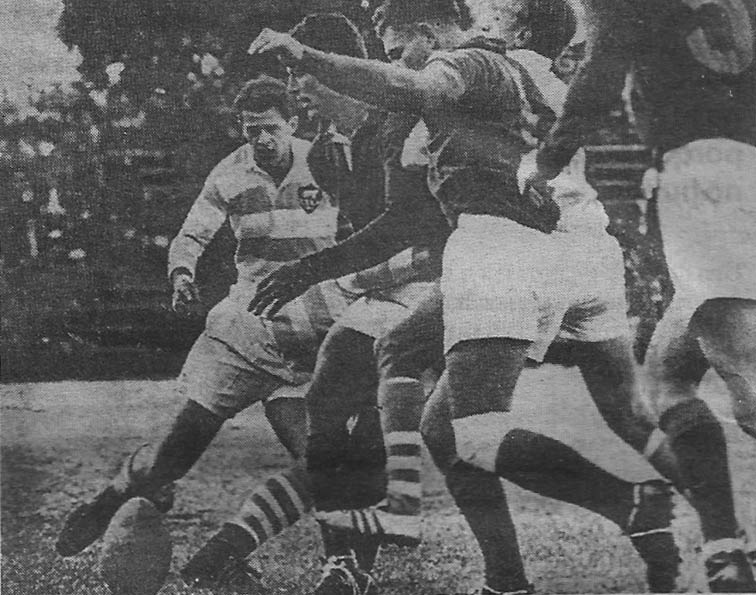
Los Pumas vs Western Transvaal 1965.

In 1959, Mc Cormick began his career playing for the club Belgrano, where he won four titles. He also was member of the executive committee of Belgrano club, and was his youth coach.

He had his first test match in the 1964 South American Rugby Championship, tournament played in São Paulo. On August 19, 1964, Mc Cormick debuted on the national team, scoring a try against Brazil, in the Argentina's victory by 30–5.

In 1965, Guillermo Mc Cormick participated in the successful tour by South Africa. On this tour the national team began using the name Los Pumas.

=== Titles ===
Season	Team	Title
1963	Belgrano Athletic Club	Torneo de la URBA
1966	Belgrano Athletic Club	Torneo de la URBA
1967	Belgrano Athletic Club	Torneo de la URBA
1968	Belgrano Athletic Club	Torneo de la URBA

=== International titles ===
Season	Team	Title
1964	Argentina	Sudamericano de Rugby
