= Agustín Smidt =

Argentine rugby union player (born 1985)

- Born: 10 May 1985 (age 41) Córdoba, Argentina
- Height: 6 ft 8 in (203 cm)
- Weight: 227 lb (103 kg)

Rugby union career
- Position: Lock
International career
Years	Team	Apps	(Points)
2008–10	Argentina	3	(10)

Agustín Smidt (born 10 May 1985) is an Argentine former international rugby union player.

== Rugby career ==
A 6 ft 8 in lock, Smidt was a national representative at the 2006 Under 21 Rugby World Championship, trained at the Jockey de Villa María club in his native Córdoba Province, where he played his senior rugby until transferring to rivals La Tablada in 2007. He won three Pumas caps between 2008 and 2010, then in 2011 left for England to play with Rotherham. After a season in Rotherham, Smidt joined French Pro D2 club AS Béziers Hérault.

== See also ==
- List of Argentina national rugby union players
