= Henry Paul Talbot =

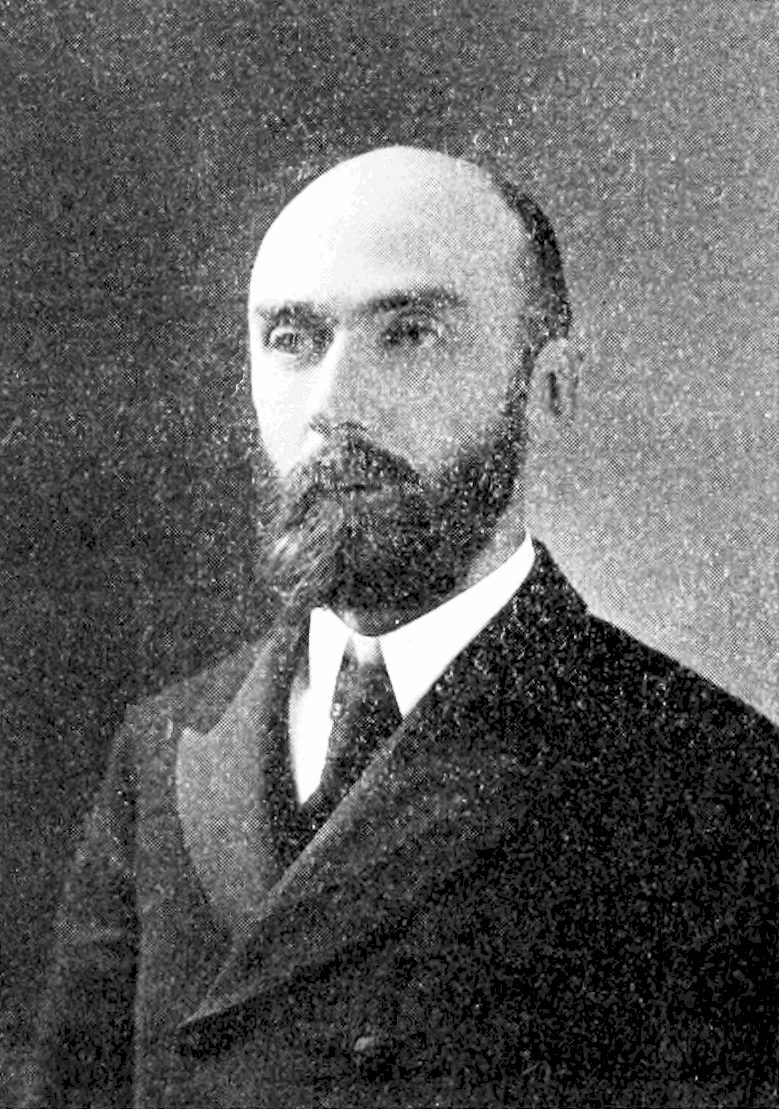
Henry Paul Talbot

Henry Paul Talbot (15 May 1864 in Boston, Massachusetts – 18 June 1927) was an American chemist at the Massachusetts Institute of Technology. He made a significant contribution to the university's reputation in research and teaching.

== Life ==
Talbot earned a bachelor's degree in analytical chemistry from the Massachusetts Institute of Technology in 1885. He then worked as a scientific assistant, then as an analytical chemistry instructor at MIT and then continued is education at the Leipzig University. There he earned his Ph.D. in 1890, studying organic and physical chemistry. He then returned to MIT to continue working as an instructor.

At MIT, he rose to assistant professor in 1892 and associate professor in 1895. He also lectured at Wellesley College between 1892 and 1894. Talbot led MIT as one of the first universities in the US to offer a course in physical chemistry. In 1898, he became full professor and in 1901 became head of the chemistry department. During World War I, he advised the Bureau of Mines and the United States Department of War, mostly on issues related to poison gas. After the death of Richard Cockburn Maclaurin (1870–1920), Talbot was interim president of MIT, and from 1921 to his death he was Dean of MIT.

In 1896, Talbot joined the American Association for the Advancement of Science (AAAS) and in 1899 the American Academy of Arts and Sciences. In 1908, he became vice-president of the AAAS. In 1921, he received an honorary doctorate from Dartmouth College.

Talbot married Frances E. Dukehart in 1891. They had no children.

== Works ==
- An Introductory Course of Quantitative Chemical Analysis, 1897.
- Bibliography of the Analytical Chemistry of Manganese, 1902.
- With Arthur A. Blanchard: The Electrolytic Dissociation Theory, 1905.
- Talbot's quantitative chemical analysis, 1937.
