= Macario Villaluenga =

Argentine rugby union player (born 1990)

- Born: 12 May 1990 (age 36) Tucumán, Argentina
- Height: 6 ft 1 in (185 cm)
- Weight: 207 lb (94 kg)

Rugby union career
- Position: Wing
International career
| Years | Team | Apps | (Points) |
| 2013 | Argentina | 2 | (10) |

Macario Villaluenga (born 12 May 1990) is an Argentine former international rugby union player.

A winger from Concepción, Tucumán, Villaluenga played his rugby for Huirapuca Social Club.

Villaluenga was capped twice by Argentina at the 2013 South American Rugby Championship in Montevideo. He scored a try on debut against Chile and another in his second Pumas appearance against Brazil.

== See also ==
- List of Argentina national rugby union players
