= 1965 Argentina rugby union tour of Rhodesia and South Africa =

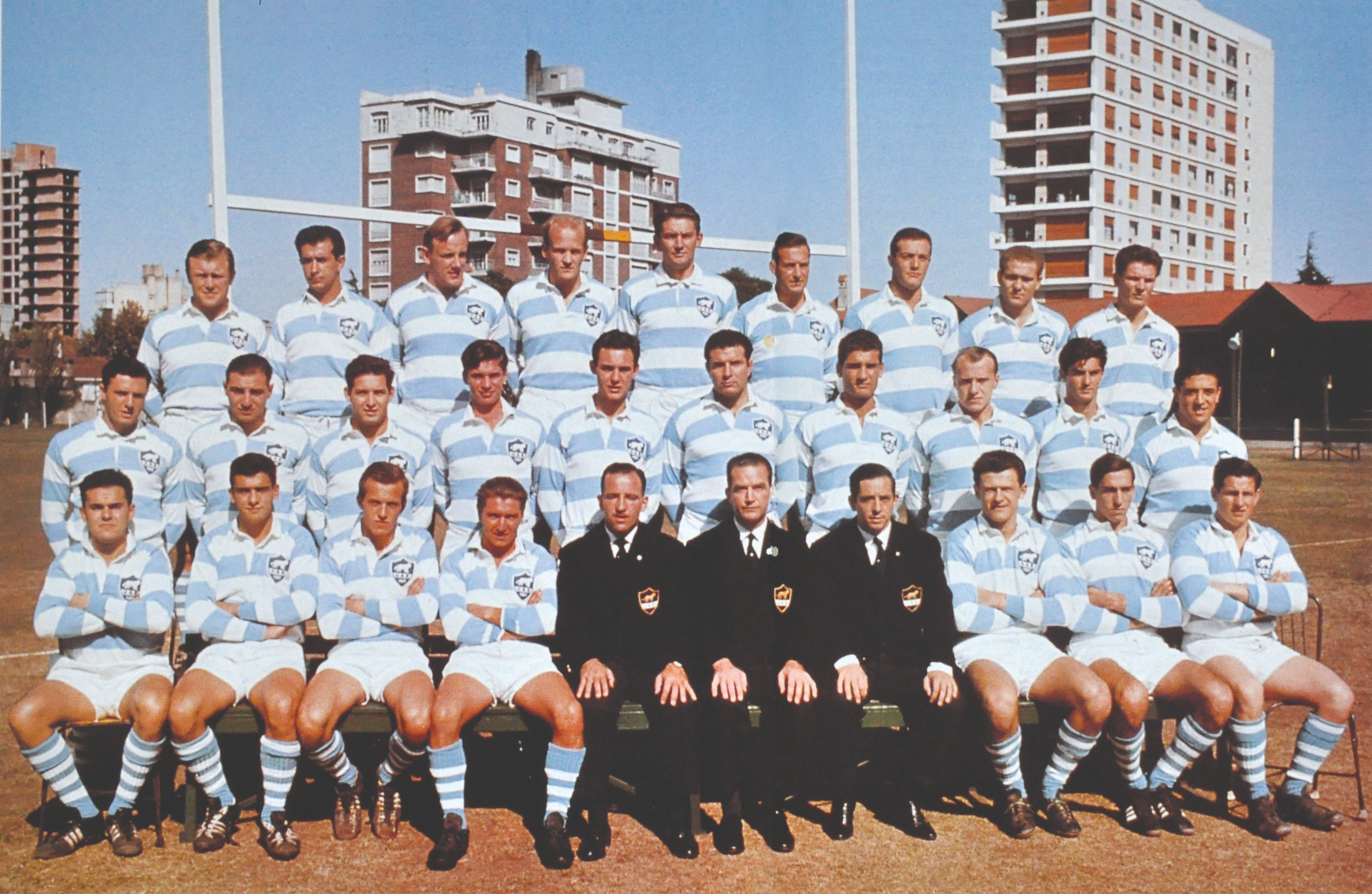
- Official photo of the touring team
- Manager: Emilio Jutard
- Coach: Alberto Camardón
- Tour captain: Aitor Otaño
- Top point scorer: Eduardo Poggi (95)
- Top try scorer(s): Aitor Otaño; Luis Loyola (7 each)
Summary
P	W	D	L
Total
16	11	1	4
Test match
1	1	0	0
Opponent
P	W	D	L
(South Africa) Junior Springboks
1	1	0	0

The 1965 Argentina rugby union tour of South Africa and Rhodesia was a series of 16 matches played by the Argentina national team in May and June 1965 in Rhodesia and South Africa.

That tour was meaningful and relevant for Argentine rugby as it saw the birth of the team's nickname (Pumas), which has identified the national team since, following the victory over the Junior Springboks at Ellis Park. That win was considered historic not only for the Argentine national team but for the sport in the country.

== The tour ==
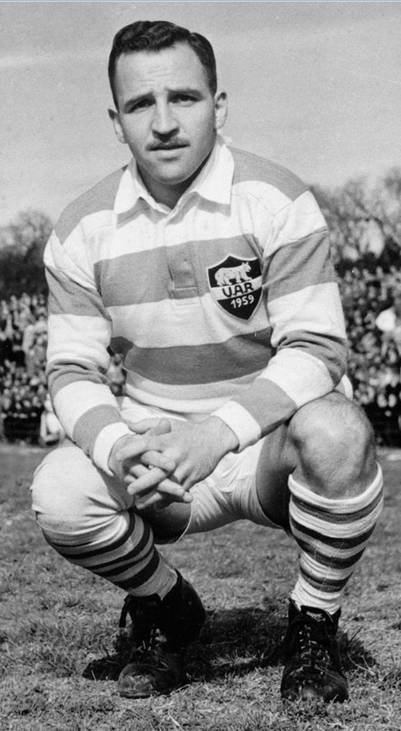
Angel Guastella was one of the coaches of Argentina during the tour

In 1959, the Junior Springboks had toured to Argentina, where they played a series of friendly matches. The South Africans were impressed by the rugby environment in the country and their visit paved the way for the trip of the Argentine team. As a result, in 1964 the South African Rugby Union sent an invitation to the UAR to send a representative team there. The SARU wanted a foreign team to play there with the purpose of spreading the practise of rugby in South Africa.

South African Danie Craven served as adviser for the team to prepare the tour, while the SA Union sent Izak van Heerden to help the Argentine Rugby Union to prepare the tour and collaborate with coaches Alberto Camardón (main coach) and Angel Guastella (second coach).

The national team played a series of preparatory games before the tour, facing local clubs and provincial representatives such as Universitario (LP) Obras Sanitarias, Alumni, Newman, Córdoba RU, Rosario RU, Duendes and Old Georgian

I remember the first day of training at Gimnasia y Esgrima under a strong rain. In those times, trainings used to be cancelled when it rained. When (Izak) van Heerden came he didn't find any player on the field; We were in the bar, playing "truco". The guy ordered us to change our clothes immediately. There were two hours of tough training, with diverse crawl movements. He changed the method, with an unusually hard way of training. We trained double shifts, morning and night, and went to our respective jobs in the middle (...) It was extremely strict, but we saw the results at last

— Aitor Otaño, captain of the team, about the training

The first two matches in South Africa were extremely hard for the Argentine squad, in disadvantage on the physical power and the tough play by their rivals. Nevertheless, Argentine players vowed themselves to change the history from then on. The "key game" of the tour was the match v. Southern Universities won by Argentina 22–6. The local media entitled "Argentina shattered the cradle of South African rugby" after that match.

Nevertheless, Argentina's most relevant victory was against the Junior Springboks – the South African second national team– to whom they defeated 11–6 at Ellis Park. Argentina lineup for that match was Cazenave, Neri, Pascual, Rodríguez Jurado, España; Poggi, Etchegaray; Loyola, Silva, Scharenberg; Schmidt, Otaño; Foster, González del Solar y García Yáñez. The photo showing centre Marcelo Pascual diving to the rival ingoal became iconic for Argentine rugby.

The Pumas nickname is the result of an error made by Carl Kohler, a journalist for the Die Transvaler newspaper in South Africa, while following the team during the tour. He tried to devise a catchy nickname for the team similar to existing international team nicknames such as All Blacks, Springboks, and Wallabies. Kohler was aware that the Americas had pumas, and as he was under pressure to submit his article, made a guess and called them "the Pumas", instead of the actual jaguar (which original name in Argentina is "yaguareté" but he refused to use that word as he was unable to utter it correctly).

The mistake stuck, and was eventually adopted by the Argentines themselves (although the UAR crest depicted a Jaguar until April 2023, when a stylized Puma figure started being used).

== Touring team ==
The Argentine squad was made up of 26 touring players:

- Walter Aniz
- Manuel Beccar Varela
- Juan Francisco Benzi
- Roberto Cazenave
- Jorge Dartiguelongue
- Eduardo España
- Adolfo Etchegaray
- Ronaldo Foster
- Luis García Yáñez
- Nicanor González del Solar
- Héctor Goti
- Luis Gradín
- Heriberto Handley
- José Luis Imhoff
- Guillermo Jiba
- Luis Loyola
- Guillermo Mc Cormick
- Enrico Neri
- Arturo Rodríguez Jurado
- Bernardo Otaño
- Marcelo Pascual
- Eduardo Poggi
- Héctor Silva
- Agustín Silveyra
- Eduardo Scharenberg
- Rodolfo Schmidt

== Match summary ==
Complete list of matches played by Argentine in South Africa: Test matches (Note: The match v. Junior Springboks was considered an official test only by the Argentine Rugby Union.)

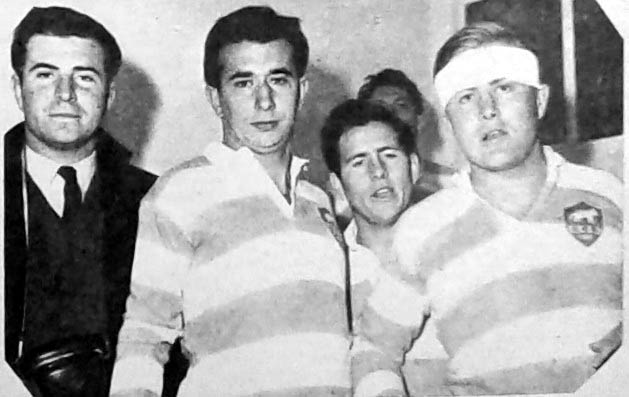
Some Pumas posing the match v Border C.D.

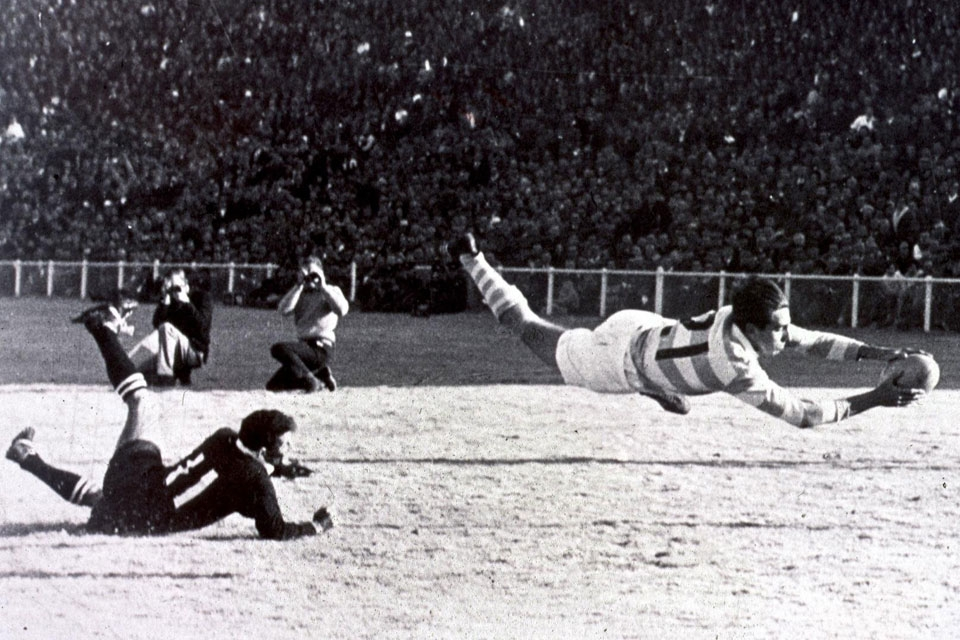
Marcelo Pascual diving in the ingoal of the Junior Springboks on June 19, 1965. That match is considered the beginning of a new era for Argentine rugby

#	Date	Rival	Res.	Score	City
1	8 May	Rhodesia (Note: Rhodesia was an unrecognised state in southern Africa from 1965 to 1979, equivalent in territory to modern Zimbabwe.)	lost	12–17	Salisbury
2	12 May	Northern Transvaal	lost	13–25	Petersburg
3	15 May	Western Transvaal	won	38–11	Potchefstroom
4	19 May	South West Africa	won	43–5	Windhoek
5	22 May	Eastern Transvaal	won	22–9	Ermelo
6	26 May	Grigualand West	won	32–12	Kimberley
7	29 May	North Eastern District	won	17–6	Aliwal North
8	1 Jun	Border Country District	draw	6–6	Queenstown
9	3 Jun	Eastern Province	won	27–6	Cradock
10	5 Jun	South West Districts	lost	0–3	Oudtshoorn
11	9 Jun	Southern Universities	won	22–6	Cape Town
12	12 Jun	Boland	won	20–12	Wellington
13	16 Jun	Orange Free State	won	17–14	Welkom
14	19 Jun	South Africa A	won	11–6	Johannesburg
15	23 Jun	Natal Country District	won	24–14	Durban
16	26 Jun	South African Country Districts	lost	11–31	Bloemfontein

Notes

Totals
Pld	W	D	L	PF	PA
16	11	1	4	315	183

== Match details ==
8 May

Rhodesia	17–12	Argentina
		Try: Otaño (2), Loyola, Neri

Salisbury

12 May

Northern Transvaal	25–13	Argentina
		Try: González del Solar, Goti, Loyola; Con: Poggi (2)

Pietersburg

15 May

Western Transvaal	11–38	Argentina
		Try: Goti (2), Gradín, Imhoff, Otaño, Silva; Con: Poggi (2); Pen: Poggi (2)

Potchefstroom

19 May

South West Africa	5–43	Argentina
		Try: Goti (2), Neri, Otaño, Silva (3); Con: Poggi (5)

Windhoek

22 May

Eastern Transvaal	9–22	Argentina
		Try: Pascual (2), Benzi, Dartiguelongue, Imhoff, Silva; Con: Poggi

Ermelo

26 May

Griqualand West	12–32	Argentina
		Try: Benzi (2), Otaño (2), Goti, McCormick; Con: Cazenave (4); Pen: Cazenave (2)

Kimberley

29 May

North Eastern Districts	6–17	Argentina
		Try: Poggi (2), Loyola; Con: Cazenave; Pen: Poggi; Drop: Benzi

Aliwal North

1 Jun

Border C.D.	6–6	Argentina
		Try: Cazenave; Pen: Poggi

Queenstown

3 Jun

Eastern Province	6–27	Argentina
		Try: Pascual (2), España, Gradín, Loyola; Con: Cazenave (3); Pen: Cazenave, Poggi

Cradock

5 Jun

South Western Districts	3–0	Argentina
		Try: Pascual (2), España, Gradín, Loyola; Con: Cazenave (3); Pen: Cazenave, Poggi

Oudtshoorn

5 Jun

Southern Universities	6–22	Argentina
		Try: Coti, Gradín, Neri, Rodríguez Jurado, Schmidt; Con: Poggi (2); Pen: Poggi

Cape Town

12 Jun

Boland	12–20	Argentina
		Try: Otaño, Poggi; Con: Poggi; Pen: Poggi (4)

Wellington

16 Jun

Orange Free State	14–17	Argentina
		Try: Cazenave, España, Loyola; Con: Poggi; Pen: Poggi (2)

Welkom

19 June

South Africa A	6–11	Argentina
Try: Du Preez (2)	Report	Try: España; Loyola; Pascual; Con: Poggi

Ellis Park, Johannesburg
Attendance: 40,000
Referee: Pieter Robbertse

Team details

Junior Springboks	Argentina

Dries Pretorius	FB	15	FB	Roberto Cazenave
J. Serfontein	W	14	W	Enrico Neri
B. Ackerman	C	13	C	Marcelo Pascual
Johan van der Schyff	C	12	C	Arturo Rodríguez Jurado
Alan Wiggett	W	11	W	Eduardo España
Hugh Bladen	FH	10	FH	Eduardo Poggi
Kid du Preez	SH	9	SH	Adolfo Etchegaray
Koos Claasen	N8	8	N8	Eduardo Scharemberg
Louis Slabber	F	7	F	Héctor Silva
Oupa du Piesanie	F	6	F	Raúl Loyola
Brian Irvine	L	5	L	Rodolfo Schmidt
E. Claassen	L	4	L	Aitor Otaño (capt.)
W. Storm	P	3	P	Ronnie Foster
N.J.J. van Rensburg	H	2	H	Nicanor González del Solar
R. Dercksen	P	1	P	Luis García Yáñez

23 Jun

Natal	14–24	Argentina
		Try: Benzi, Loyola, Poggi, Rodríguez Jurado; Con: Cazenave (3); Pen: Cazenave

Durban

26 Jun

South African C.D.	31–11	Argentina
		Try: España, Pascual; Con: Poggi; Pen: Poggi

Bloemfontein

== Statistics ==
=== Most matches ===
Player	Match.
Eduardo Poggi	13
Aitor Otaño	13
Marcelo Pascual	13
Héctor Silva	13
Luis Loyola	12
Eduardo España	12
Luis García Yáñez	12
Roberto Cazenave	11
Ronaldo Foster	11

=== Top scorers ===
Player	Tries	Conv.	Drops	Pen.	Mark.	Total pts.
Eduardo Poggi	6	16	0	15	0	95
Roberto Cazenave	2	11	0	4	1	43
Aitor Otaño	7	0	0	0	0	21
Luis Loyola	7	0	0	0	0	21
Marcelo Pascual	6	0	0	0	0	18

== Aftermath ==
The tour is considered the birth of the modern "Pumas" because of the national team had not achieved great results until then. The victory v the Junior Springboks was widely covered by the Argentine media and it is considered a turning point for the national team.

In an interview for the 50th anniversary of the tour, Héctor Silva stated:

We went with the intention of showing Argentine rugby outside the country, but the media repercussion was more than expected. The tour made Argentine rugby be recognised at international level. After that, some teams started to invite us to play. Oxford-Cambridge, Gazelles, Wales, Scotland, Ireland... came to the country and that allowed us to show all we had made during the tour.

About the first matches, Heriberto Handley said in the same interview:

We had never played that level, and they beat us up in the first matches. So we said, "know what? The story is over", and we started to play "hand-by-hand", and we beat them up.

"Coco" Benzi added:

Some reasons to explain the success were the unified group we were inside and outside the field. All of us wanted to play always, but the player who was in the bench became the n° 1 fan of the team (...) 'Willie' McCormick dislocated his shoulder four times. And he played as prop! The rivals tried to get him out of the field, but he fixed his shoulder by himself and said "I'm ok, I'm ok".

== Bibliography ==
- Vivian Jenkins, ed. (1979). Rothmans Rugby Yearbook 1979-80. Queen Anne Press. pp. 47–51. ISBN 0-354-09087-9.
