= Miguel McCormick =

Argentine rugby union player

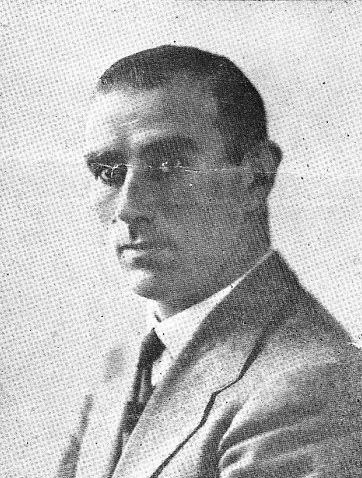
- M. McCormick
- Born: c. 1900 Greater Buenos Aires, Argentina
- Died: 1963 Argentina

Rugby union career
Amateur team(s)
Years	Team	Apps	(Points)
1923-1938	Pacific Rugby A.C.		
International career
Years	Team	Apps	(Points)
1927	Argentina		

Miguel McCormick (born c. 1900) was an Argentine rugby union player. He played as flanker for Pacific Rugby A.C. (current Ferrocarril San Martín), and the Argentina national team.

== Career ==
McCormick was born in Buenos Aires to a family of Irish origin. He began his rugby playing career for Pacific Railway Athletic Club. McCormick was captain of the first team for over 12 years and coach of all divisions.

McCormick made his debut playing for the Argentina national rugby union team on July 31, 1927, against Great Britain.

== Gallery ==
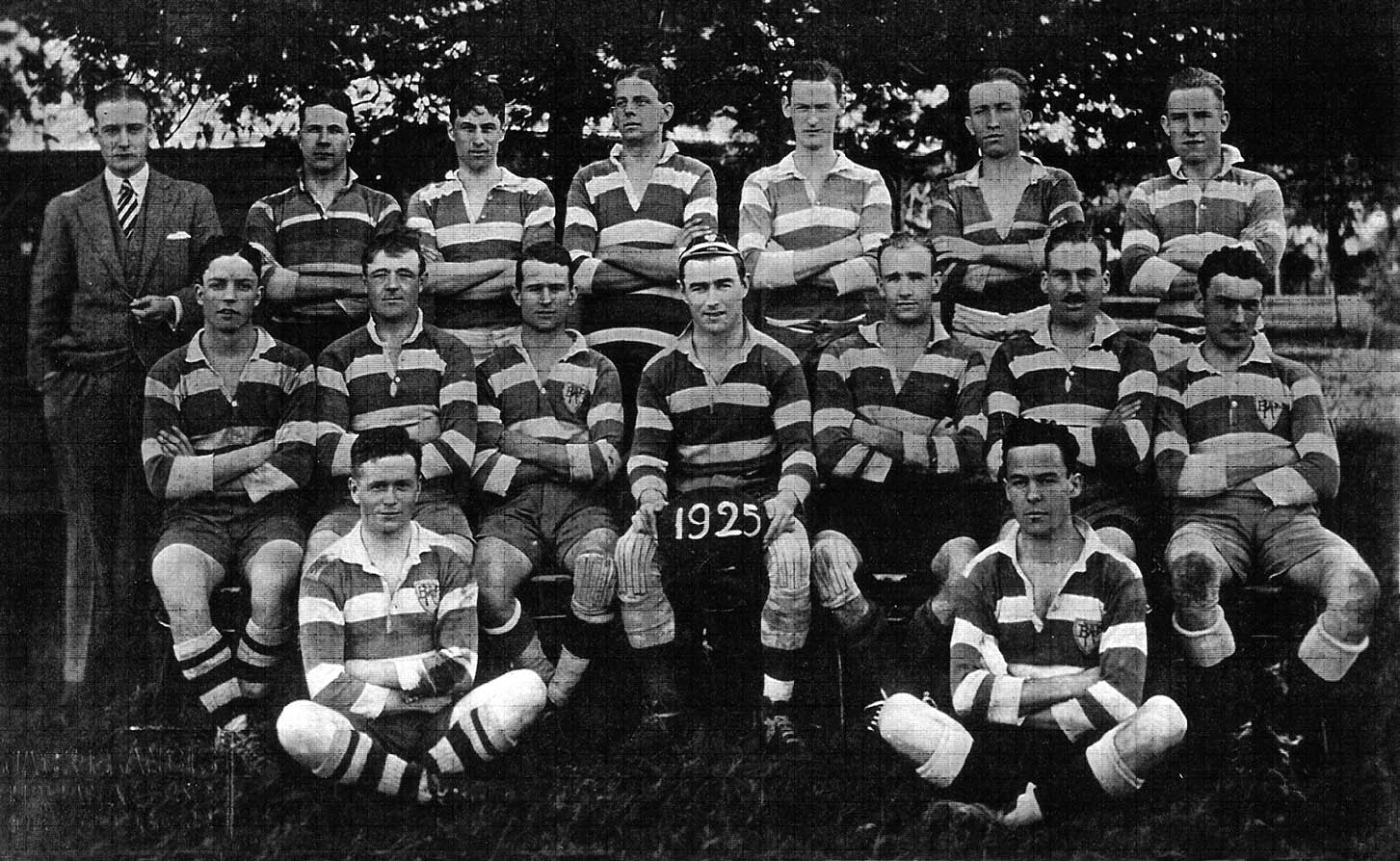
Pacific Railway Athletic team 1925

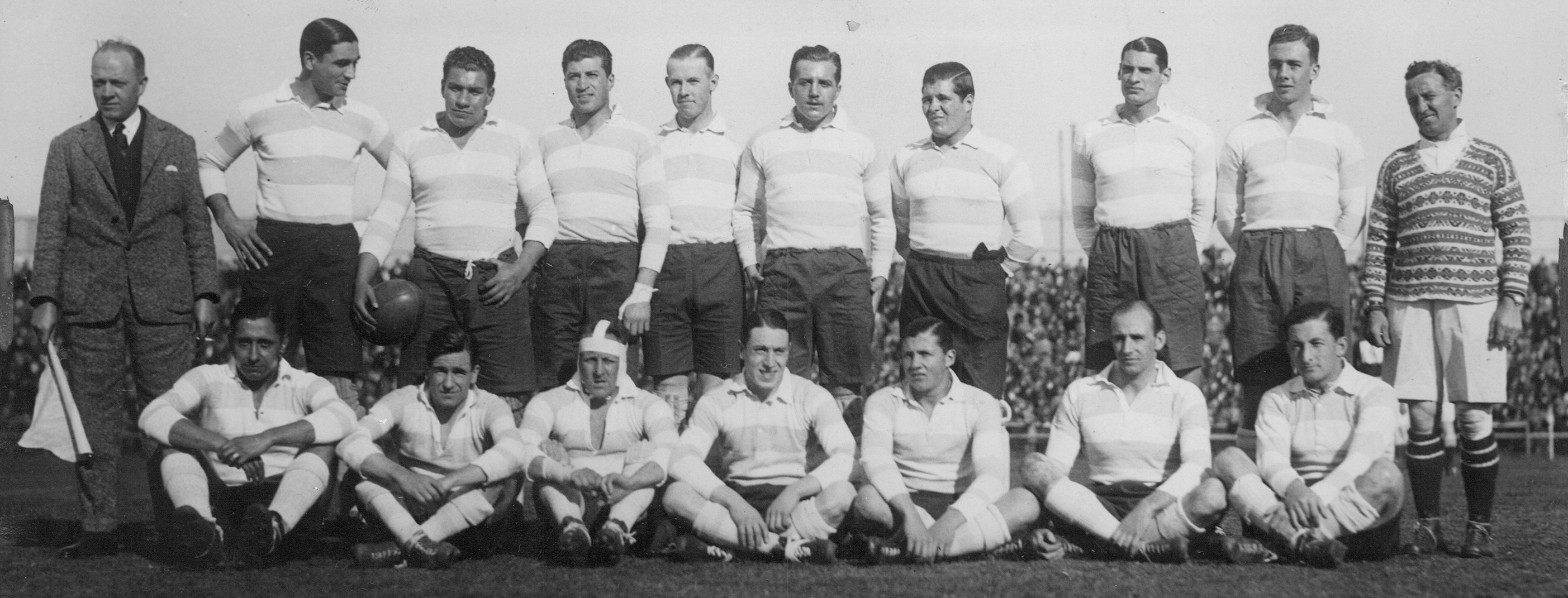
Argentina national team 1927
