= James Ambrosini =

- Born: 5 June 1991 (age 35) Brisbane
- Height: 1.78 m (5 ft 10 in)
- Weight: 85 kg (187 lb)

Rugby union career
- Position: Fly-half
Youth career
- Sunnybank Rugby
- 2009−11: Brumbies Academy
Senior career
Years	Team	Apps	(Points)
2011−12	Hartpury		
2012−16	Treviso	52	(25)
2016−18	San Donà	32	(282)
2018−19	Fiamme Oro	16	(111)
2019−20	Rovigo Delta	5	(12)
International career
Years	Team	Apps	(Points)
2012−2014	Emerging Italy	6	(31)
2016−	Italy Seven	43	(171)
- Correct as of 15 September 2017

James Ambrosini (born Brisbane, 5 June 1991) is an Australian-born Italian rugby union player. He plays for Rovigo Delta as a fly-half.

His father was born in Ari, Abruzzo, Italy and his mother is from Australia. Due to his father, Ambrosini is eligible to play for the Italian national rugby union team.

== Benetton Treviso ==
He played for Benetton Treviso from 2012–13 Pro12 to 2015–16 Pro12 season.

== San Donà ==
Ambrosini signs with Amatori San Donà for the 2017–2018 season.

== Rovigo Delta ==
He Played for Rovigo Delta for 2019–2020 season.
