= George Gebbie =

Scottish-American publisher (1832–1892)

George Gebbie (24 August 1832 in Sorn – 13 August 1892 in Philadelphia) was a Scottish American publisher who founded Gebbie and Company. George was born in Sorn, Ayrshire and by 1861 was living in London. He migrated to the United States in 1863, initially settling in Utica, New York. After a brief period in New York City he moved to Philadelphia by March 1866. He married Mary Jane Fitzgerald. Following his death, his personal library was sold in November 1894.
