= Henry Talbot (rugby union) =

Argentine rugby union player

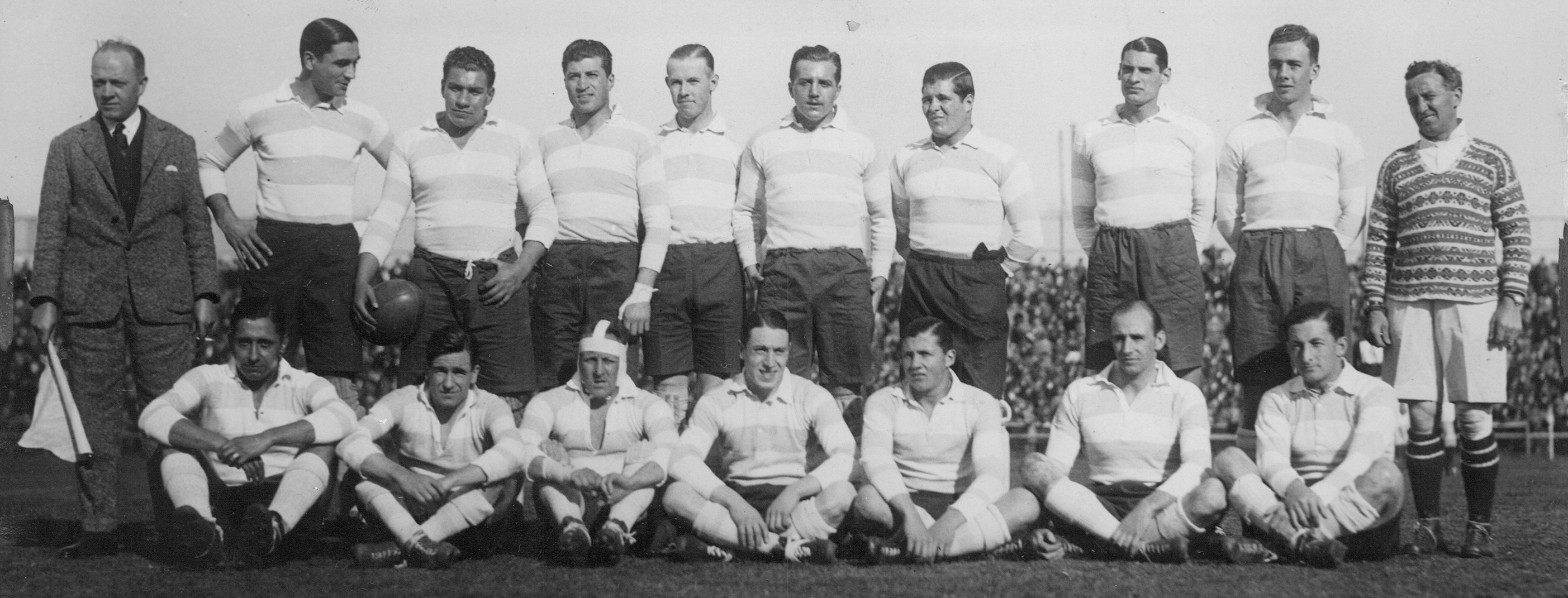
- Talbot with the Argentine team, 1927
- Born: Rosario, Argentina
- Died: Argentina

Rugby union career
- Position: Wing
Senior career
Years	Team	Apps	(Points)
- Club Atlético del Rosario
International career
Years	Team	Apps	(Points)
1910	Argentina		

Henry Talbot was an Argentine rugby union footballer, who played in the Club Atlético del Rosario, and in the Argentina national rugby union team.

== Career ==
Talbot was born in Rosario, Argentina, a member of a family of British ancestry. He started his career in rugby union playing as a wing for the Club Atlético del Rosario. Talbot was the Captain of the Rosario team, and had won two consecutive titles in 1905 and 1906.

In 1910, Talbot was part of the first Argentina national team, captained by Oswald Gebbie. On June 12, 1910, he made his debut for Argentina against Great Britain.

=== Titles ===
Season	Team	Title
1905	Club Atlético del Rosario	Torneo de la URBA
1906	Club Atlético del Rosario	Torneo de la URBA
