= José Morganti =

Argentine rugby union footballer

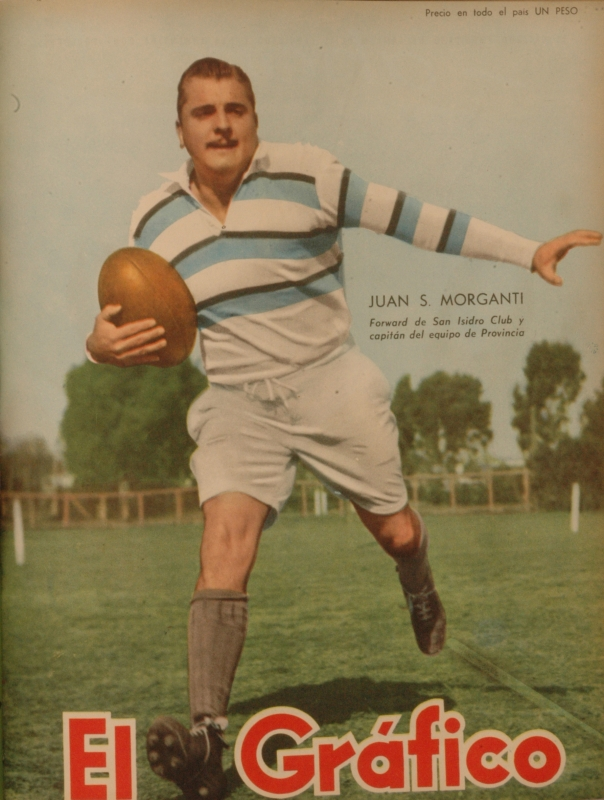
- Morganti covered on El Gráfico in 1951
- Born: Buenos Aires, Argentina
- Died: Buenos Aires, Argentina
- Height: 6.0 ft (183 cm)
- Weight: 220 lb (100 kg)

Rugby union career
- Position: Forward
Youth career
- ?: C.A. San Isidro
Senior career
Years	Team	Apps	(Points)
1947–1951	San Isidro Club		
International career
Years	Team	Apps	(Points)
1951	Argentina		

José Morganti (nicknamed Cacho), was an Argentine rugby union footballer, who played in the Club Atlético San Isidro and San Isidro Club, winning league titles with both. He also captained the Argentina national team and of Buenos Aires Provincial side.

== Career ==
Morganti was born in Buenos Aires, beginning his career at Club Atlético San Isidro (mostly known as "CASI"), club where played from 1940 to 1946. In 1947, Morganti moved to CASI's main rival, San Isidro Club, where he played until his retirement in 1951.

In 1951, Morganti was called up to join the national team that played the first South American championship that same year. Morganti was captain of the national team that played the final game v. Chile at GEBA stadium, ending with a victory for Argentina by 13–3, therefore crowning champion.

== Titles ==
=== Club ===
C.A. San Isidro

- Torneo de la URBA (1): 1943

San Isidro Club

- Torneo de la URBA (1): 1948

Buenos Aires Province

- Campeonato Argentino (1): 1951

=== National team ===
Argentina

- South American Championship (1): 1951
