= Dan Isaack =

Argentine rugby union player (born 1990)

- Born: 30 April 1990 (age 36) Rosario, Argentina
- Height: 6 ft 0 in (183 cm)
- Weight: 216 lb (98 kg)

Rugby union career
- Position: Utility back
International career
Years	Team	Apps	(Points)
2013	Argentina	2	(20)

Dan Isaack (born 30 April 1990) is an Argentine former rugby union international.

A native of Rosario, Isaack was a utility back, who played as a centre, winger and fullback for Jockey Club de Rosario.

Isaack gained two caps for Argentina at the 2013 South American Championship in Montevideo, debuting in a win over host nation Uruguay. He was then a substitute fullback in the match against Chile, scoring four second half tries.

From 2019 to 2022, Isaack played rugby in Spain for FC Barcelona.

== See also ==
- List of Argentina national rugby union players
