= Simone Ragusi =

Italian rugby union player

- Full name: Simone Ragusi
- Born: 28 March 1992 (age 34) Milan, Italy
- Height: 1.78 m (5 ft 10 in)
- Weight: 85 kg (13 st 5 lb; 187 lb)

Rugby union career
- Position: Full back
- Current team: Petrarca
Youth career
- 1996-2011: ASR Milano
Senior career
Years	Team	Apps	(Points)
2011−2012	Ospreys	0	(0)
2011−2012	→Bridgend RFC	3	(0)
2012−2013	Prato	23	(150)
2013−2014	Rovigo	19	(57)
2014−2016	Treviso	34	(25)
2016−2020	Petrarca	51	(125)
2020−2022	Calvisano	29	(28)
- Correct as of 25 April 2015
International career
Years	Team	Apps	(Points)
2013-2014	Emerging Italy	6	(27)
2016−	Italy Seven	15	(32)
- Correct as of 14 November 2014

Simone Ragusi (born 28 March 1992) is an Italian rugby union player who plays as a full back. He currently plays for Calvisano currently competing in the top tier of the Italian rugby union, the Top12.

== Youth ==
Ragusi was born in Milan, Italy. He was born into a rugby family; his father is a coach and his brother, Federico, plays at a semi-professional level for asrmilano in the second tier Serie A of the Italian system. Simone's grand father has been a referee, and for several years president of referees national committee also rugby Lombardy region president. Simone Ragusi started playing rugby at the age of 4, for the local youth of AS Rugby Milano.

== Career ==
Simone temporarily transferred to Wales to gain experience with the Ospreys and Bridgend RFC to play in the Welsh Premier Division. In 2012, he returned to Italy joining Prato, where he found his footing playing regularly at Fly-half, later playing in the final of the 2012-13 National Championship Eccellenza(Top10) losing 16-11 against Mogliano. Simone was fullback and kicker. Around this time he made his debut for Italy National second Team; National Emerging. The following year he transferred to Rovigo, once again fielding for the second consecutive time in the final of the Championship of Eccellenza (top10). This time the title went to Calvisano who prevailed after coming from 0 - 17 down to win 26-17. Simone scored the first try of the match at the first minutes. After that season Simone Ragusi has been signed for Benetton Treviso, following by an Italy national team call for November test matches 2014, Six nation 2015 and the preparation camp of the 2015 World Cup in England and Wales.

== Benetton Treviso ==
In 2014, Ragusi Simon moved to Benetton Treviso to once again try for the Pro12. He played 13 games in the 2014-2015 season scoring four tries. He played 12 games and 672 minutes in the Pro 12 2015-2016 season. The same year he also received his first call from the Italian national rugby union team. Simone is also been part of Italy sevens national team where he is being proving essential for the team.

== Petrarca Rugby ==
From 2016 to 2020 Simone Ragusi played for Petrarca Padova where I collected 3178 minutes, making 16 try playing principally as fullback and then flyhalf and outside centre. After the 2017/18 season win by Simone Ragusi and Petrarca Padova, Simone was nominated as best fullback of the competition inserted in the best XV of the Season.

== Calvisano Rugby ==
From 2020 to 2022 Ragusi played for Calvisano currently competing in the top tier of the Italian rugby union, the Top12.

== Ireland ==
Ragusi spent three seasons in Ireland, playing for Navan RFC (2022/23) and Greystones RFC (2023/24) in the All-Ireland League (AIL). During this time, he also served as an assistant coach for Navan RFC and worked with Leinster Rugby. Additionally, he was an assistant coach for the Presentation College Bray Senior Cup team, leading them to victory in the Vinnie Murray Cup. This win marked the school's first Senior Cup title in 93 years.
