= 1964 South American Rugby Championship =

4° Sudamericano de Rugby
Tournament details
- Host: Brazil
- Date: 16–20 August 1964
- Countries: Argentina; Brazil; Chile; Uruguay

Final positions
- Champions: Argentina
- Runner-up: Brazil

Tournament statistics
- Matches played: 6

The 1964 South American Rugby Championship was the fourth edition of the competition of the leading national rugby union teams in South America.

The tournament was played in São Paulo, Brazil and was won by Argentina.

== Standings ==
Team	Played	Won	Drawn	Lost	For	Against	Difference	Pts
Argentina	3	3	0	0	85	22	+63	6
Brazil	3	1	1	1	39	54	−15	3
Uruguay	3	1	0	2	29	48	−19	2
Chile	3	0	1	2	32	61	−29	1

== Results ==
16 August 1964

Brazil	16–16	Chile

SP Atletic, São Paulo

16 August 1964

Argentina	25–6	Uruguay

SP Atletic, São Paulo

18 August 1964

Brazil	8–30	Argentina

SP Atletic, São Paulo

18 August 1964

Chile	8–15	Uruguay

SP Atletic, São Paulo

20 August 1964

Argentina	30–8	Chile

SP Atletic, São Paulo

20 August 1964

Brazil	15–8	Uruguay

SP Atletic, São Paulo
