= Edoardo Ruffolo =

Italian rugby union player (born 1991)

- Born: 11 December 1991 (age 34) Parma, Italy
- Height: 1.94 m (6 ft 4 in)
- Weight: 100 kg (15 st 10 lb; 220 lb)

Rugby union career
- Position: Flanker
- Current team: Valorugby Emilia
Youth career
- Noceto
Senior career
Years	Team	Apps	(Points)
2010−2012	Crociati Parma	17	(0)
2012−2013	I Cavalieri Prato	25	(15)
2013−2018	Rovigo Delta	76	(65)
2018−2019	Viadana	10	(15)
2019−	Valorugby Emilia		
- Correct as of 24 June 2020
International career
Years	Team	Apps	(Points)
2011	Italy Under 20	4	(0)
2013	Emerging Italy	6	(10)
- Correct as of 24 June 2020

Edoardo Ruffolo (born 11 December 1991) is an Italian rugby union player. His usual position is as a Flanker and he currently plays for Valorugby Emilia in Top12.

After playing for Italy Under 20 in 2011, in 2013 he also was named in the Emerging Italy squad.
