= Agustín Macome =

Argentine rugby union player

Agustín Macome (born 23 June 1967) is a former Argentine rugby union player. He played as a flanker.

Macome played for Tucumán Rugby Club in the Nacional de Clubes of Argentina.

He had 4 caps for Argentina, from 1990 to 1994, scoring 1 try, 4 points on aggregate. He was called for the 1995 Rugby World Cup, but he never played.
