= Germán Llanes =

Argentine rugby union player (born 1968)

- Born: Germán Antonio Llanes; May 27, 1968 (age 58) Cañada Seca

Rugby union career
- Position: Lock
Senior career
Years	Team	Apps	(Points)
1986-1995	La Plata		
1995-1996	Mirano		
1997-1998	Bath		
1999-2002	La Rochelle		
2002-03	Bègles-Bordeaux		
2002-06	La Rochelle		
International career
Years	Team	Apps	(Points)
1990-2000	Argentina	42	(5)

Germán Antonio Llanes (born Cañada Seca, 27 May 1968) is former Argentine rugby union player. He played as a lock.

Llanes played for La Plata Rugby Club, from 1986/87 to 1994/95, Mirano Rugby 1957, in Italy, in 1995/96, Bath Rugby, in England, for 1997/98, Stade Rochelais, from 1999/2000 to 2001/2002, CA Bègles-Bordeaux, in 2002/03, Stade Rochelais, once again, for 2003/04, and Stade Bordelais, in 2005/06, where he finished his career, aged 38 years old.

Llanes had 42 caps for Argentina, from 1990 to 2000, scoring 1 try, 5 points on aggregate. He was called for the 1991 Rugby World Cup, playing in two matches, and for the 1995 Rugby World Cup, playing in three matches. He never scored in both occasions.
