= Matías Allen =

Argentine rugby union player (born 1968)

- Born: April 29, 1968 (age 58) Buenos Aires
- Occupation: Architect

Rugby union career
- Position: Centre
Senior career
Years	Team	Apps	(Points)
198?-199?	Club Atlético San Isidro		
International career
Years	Team	Apps	(Points)
1990-1991	Argentina	5	(0)

Matías Allen (born 29 April 1968 in Buenos Aires) is a former Argentine rugby union player and a current coach. He played as a centre. He is professionally an architect.

Allen played for Club Atlético San Isidro in the Nacional de Clubes, which he won in 1995. He was their captain from 1988 to 1996.

He had 5 caps for Argentina, from the 15-19 loss to Canada at 16 June 1990, for the 1991 Rugby World Cup qualifyings, to the 41-6 win over Chile at 15 August 1991, in Santiago, Chile for the 1991 South American Rugby Championship. He was called for the 1991 Rugby World Cup, but he never played. He never scored during his brief international career.

After finishing his player career, he became a coach. He was the coach of Club Atlético San Isidro (CASI) nominated in 2010.

He was nominated executive director of the Argentine Olympic Committee in August 2009.
