= Oswald Gebbie =

Argentine rugby union player (1878–1956)

Oswald Saint-John Gebbie
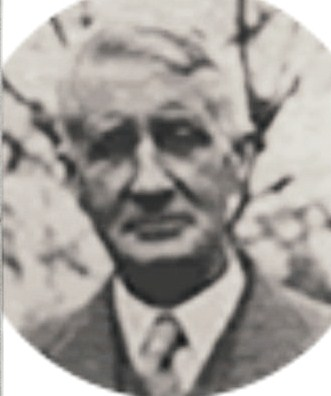

Personal details
- Born: February 9, 1878 Greater Buenos Aires, Argentina
- Died: November 13, 1956 (aged 78) Buenos Aires, Argentina
- Occupation: Chairman
- Profession: Sportsman

Oswald Gebbie (February 9, 1878 – November 13, 1956) was an Argentine rugby union footballer. He was President of The Argentine Rugby Union, between 1936 and 1940.

== Career ==
Gebbie was born in Florencio Varela, Buenos Aires, son of a family of Scottish origin. He started his rugby playing career in Buenos Aires Cricket & Rugby Club. On June 12, 1910, Gebbie was part of the first national rugby team of Argentina. He debuted against British Lions team. The match was played in the stadium the Flores Athletic Club, with a score 28–3 in favor of the British.

Oswald Gebbie playing as centre, he was the first captain in the Argentina national rugby union team.
