= History of rugby union matches between Argentina and New Zealand =

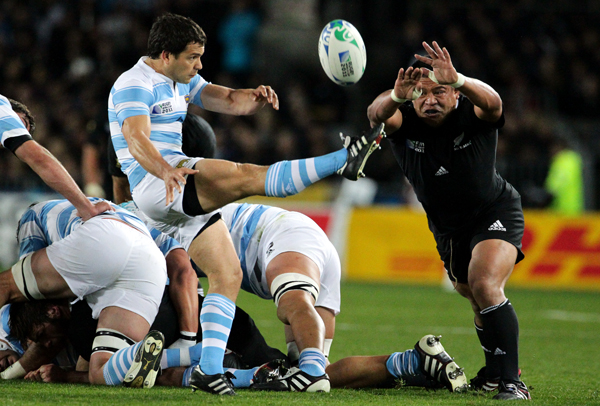
Match at the 2011 Rugby World Cup

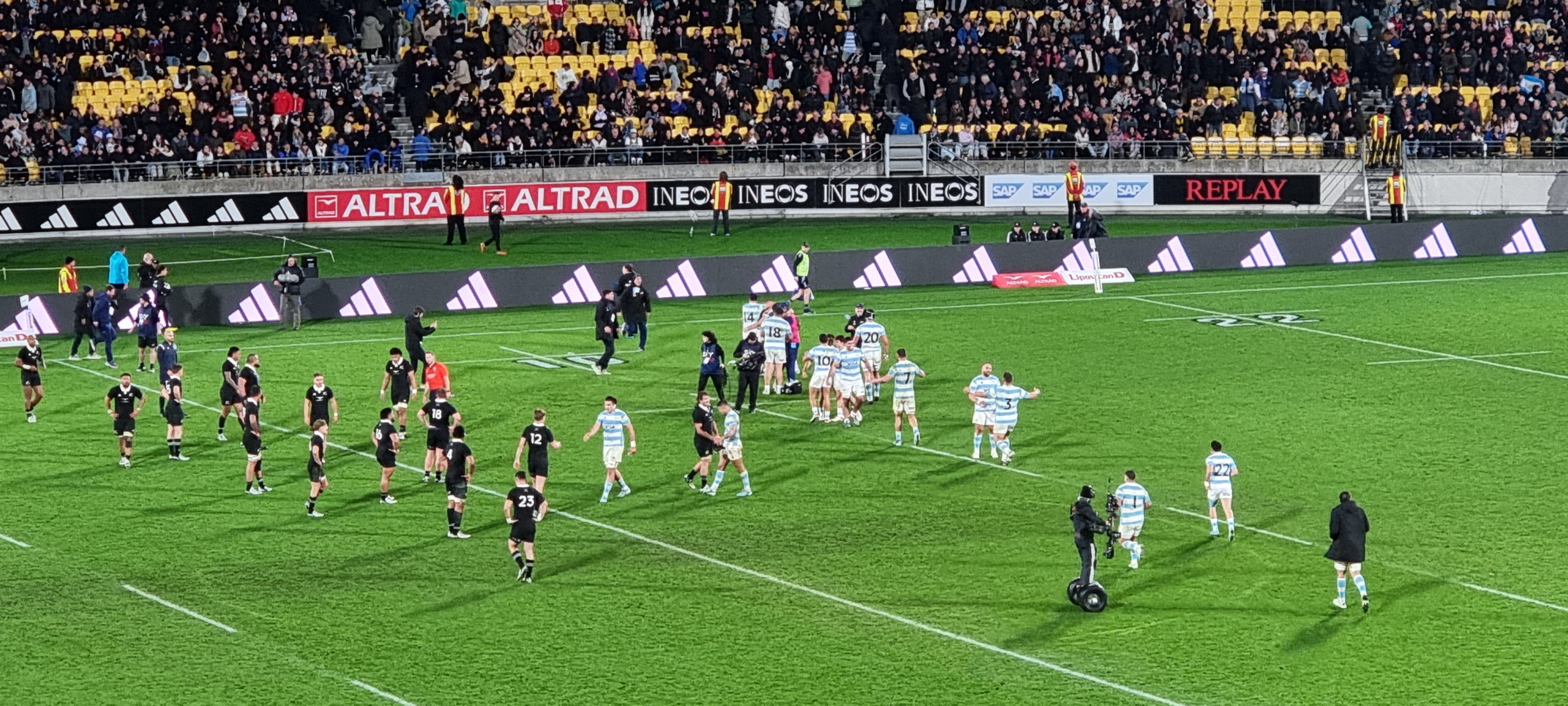
Argentine players celebrating their win vs New Zealand on 10 August 2024.

Argentina and New Zealand have been playing each other in the sport of Rugby Union since 1976.

New Zealand first sent a team, a New Zealand XV rather than the top All Blacks team, to play against Argentina's Los Pumas on 30 October 1976. Argentina credited its own players with test match caps for both games on that tour, and for two games against the New Zealand XV when Argentina toured New Zealand in 1979. The New Zealand XV won all these matches.

The first Test Match that was recognised by both national unions was held on 26 October 1985, when the top level All Blacks toured Argentina.

In full Tests, the teams have met 41 times. The All Blacks have won 36 times, with the Pumas winning 4 and 1 match drawn. Argentina claimed their first ever win over the All Blacks with a 25–15 victory in Sydney, Australia on 14 November 2020. Argentina scored their first ever victory over the All Blacks on New Zealand soil with a 25–18 win in Christchurch on 27 August 2022. Argentina scored their first win on home soil against the All Blacks with a 29–23 victory in Buenos Aires on 23 August 2025. These games have included four meetings at the Rugby World Cup, the teams having been in the same pool at the inaugural tournament in 1987, then at the quarter-finals in 2011, then again in the pool stage in 2015, and then in the semi-final in 2023.

Since 2012, the teams have met twice annually in The Rugby Championship (formerly known as the Tri Nations before Argentina's entry in the 2012 Tournament as the fourth participating team). The 2015, 2019, and 2023 Rugby Championships were exceptions, with each side playing the other only once due to those competitions shortly preceding the same years' editions of the Rugby World Cup.

== Summary ==
Note: Summary below does not include the four Los Pumas versus New Zealand XV matches from 1976 to 1979, which only Argentina recognizes as tests.

=== Overall ===
Details	Played	Won by Argentina	Won by New Zealand	Drawn	Argentina points	New Zealand points
In Argentina	16	1	14	1	268	520
In New Zealand	19	2	17	0	279	852
Neutral venue	6	1	5	0	60	198
Overall	41	4	36	1	607	1,570

=== Records ===
Note: Date shown in brackets indicates when the record was or last set.

Record	Argentina	New Zealand
Longest winning streak	1 (14–28 November 2020; 27 August – 3 September 2022)	27 (1 June 1987 – 14 November 2020)
Largest points for
Home	29 (23 August 2025)	93 (21 June 1997)
Away	38 (10 August 2024)	54 (29 September 2012)
Largest winning margin
Home	6 (23 August 2025)	85 (21 June 1997)
Away	10 (14 November 2020)	39 (29 September 2012; 12 September 2021)

== Results ==
No.	Date	Venue	Score	Winner	Competition
1	26 October 1985	Ferro Carril Oeste, Buenos Aires	20–33	New Zealand	1985 New Zealand tour of Argentina
2	2 November 1985	Ferro Carril Oeste, Buenos Aires	21–21	draw	1985 New Zealand tour of Argentina
3	1 June 1987	Athletic Park, Wellington	46–15	New Zealand	1987 Rugby World Cup
4	15 July 1989	Carisbrook, Dunedin	60–9	New Zealand	1989 Argentina tour of New Zealand
5	29 July 1989	Athletic Park, Wellington	49–12	New Zealand	1989 Argentina tour of New Zealand
6	6 July 1991	José Amalfitani Stadium, Buenos Aires	14–28	New Zealand	1991 New Zealand tour of Argentina
7	13 July 1991	José Amalfitani Stadium, Buenos Aires	6–36	New Zealand	1991 New Zealand tour of Argentina
8	21 June 1997	Athletic Park, Wellington	93–8	New Zealand	1997 Argentina tour of New Zealand
9	28 June 1997	Rugby Park, Hamilton	62–10	New Zealand	1997 Argentina tour of New Zealand
10	23 June 2001	Lancaster Park, Christchurch	67–19	New Zealand	2001 Argentina tour of Argentina
11	1 December 2001	Estadio Monumental, Buenos Aires	20–24	New Zealand	2001 New Zealand tour of Argentina, Ireland and Scotland
12	26 June 2004	Waikato Stadium, Hamilton	41–7	New Zealand	2004 Argentina tour of New Zealand
13	24 June 2006	José Amalfitani Stadium, Buenos Aires	19–25	New Zealand	2006 New Zealand tour of Argentina
14	9 October 2011	Eden Park, Auckland	33–10	New Zealand	2011 Rugby World Cup
15	8 September 2012	Wellington Regional Stadium, Wellington	21–5	New Zealand	2012 Rugby Championship
16	29 September 2012	Estadio Ciudad de La Plata, La Plata	15–54	New Zealand	2012 Rugby Championship
17	7 September 2013	Waikato Stadium, Hamilton	28–13	New Zealand	2013 Rugby Championship
18	28 September 2013	Estadio Ciudad de La Plata, La Plata	15–33	New Zealand	2013 Rugby Championship
19	6 September 2014	McLean Park, Napier	28–9	New Zealand	2014 Rugby Championship
20	27 September 2014	Estadio Ciudad de La Plata, La Plata	13–34	New Zealand	2014 Rugby Championship
21	17 July 2015	Rugby League Park, Christchurch	39–18	New Zealand	2015 Rugby Championship
22	20 September 2015	Wembley Stadium, London (England)	26–16	New Zealand	2015 Rugby World Cup
23	10 September 2016	Waikato Stadium, Hamilton	57–22	New Zealand	2016 Rugby Championship
24	1 October 2016	José Amalfitani Stadium, Buenos Aires	17–36	New Zealand	2016 Rugby Championship
25	9 September 2017	Yarrow Stadium, New Plymouth	39–22	New Zealand	2017 Rugby Championship
26	30 September 2017	José Amalfitani Stadium, Buenos Aires	10–36	New Zealand	2017 Rugby Championship
27	8 September 2018	Trafalgar Park, Nelson	46–24	New Zealand	2018 Rugby Championship
28	29 September 2018	José Amalfitani Stadium, Buenos Aires	17–35	New Zealand	2018 Rugby Championship
29	20 July 2019	José Amalfitani Stadium, Buenos Aires	16–20	New Zealand	2019 Rugby Championship
30	14 November 2020	Western Sydney Stadium, Sydney (Australia)	15–25	Argentina	2020 Tri Nations Series
31	28 November 2020	Newcastle Int. Sports Centre, Newcastle (Australia)	0–38	New Zealand	2020 Tri Nations Series
32	11 September 2021	Robina Stadium, Gold Coast (Australia)	0–39	New Zealand	2021 Rugby Championship
33	18 September 2021	Lang Park, Brisbane (Australia)	36–13	New Zealand	2021 Rugby Championship
34	27 August 2022	Rugby League Park, Christchurch	18–25	Argentina	2022 Rugby Championship
35	3 September 2022	Waikato Stadium, Hamilton	53–3	New Zealand	2022 Rugby Championship
36	8 July 2023	Estadio Malvinas Argentinas, Mendoza	12–41	New Zealand	2023 Rugby Championship
37	20 October 2023	Stade de France, Saint-Denis (France)	6–44	New Zealand	2023 Rugby World Cup
38	10 August 2024	Wellington Regional Stadium, Wellington	30–38	Argentina	2024 Rugby Championship
39	17 August 2024	Eden Park, Auckland	42–10	New Zealand	2024 Rugby Championship
40	16 August 2025	Estadio Mario Alberto Kempes, Córdoba	24–41	New Zealand	2025 Rugby Championship
41	23 August 2025	José Amalfitani Stadium, Buenos Aires	29–23	Argentina	2025 Rugby Championship

== XV Results ==
Below is a list of matches that Argentina has awarded matches test match status by virtue of awarding caps, but New Zealand did not award caps, as the governing New Zealand Rugby Union had sent a New Zealand XV rather than the top All Blacks team.

Not classed as a full international by New Zealand, who fielded a New Zealand XV rather than the All Blacks:

Date	Venue	Score	Winner	Comments
30 October 1976	Estadio Ricardo Etcheverry, Buenos Aires	9–21	New Zealand XV	1976 New Zealand XV tour of South America
6 November 1976	Estadio Ricardo Etcheverry, Buenos Aires	6–26	New Zealand XV	1976 New Zealand XV tour of South America
8 September 1979	Carisbrook, Dunedin	18–9	New Zealand XV	1979 Argentina tour of New Zealand
15 September 1979	Athletic Park, Wellington	15–6	New Zealand XV	1979 Argentina tour of New Zealand

== List of series ==
Played	Won by Argentina	Won by New Zealand	Drawn
4	0	4	0

Year	Argentina Wins	New Zealand Wins	Series winner
1985	0	1	New Zealand
1989	0	2	New Zealand
1991	0	2	New Zealand
1997	0	2	New Zealand
