= Mark Robinson (rugby, born 1975) =

NZ international rugby union & league player

- Born: Mark Darren Robinson; 21 August 1975 (age 51) Palmerston North, New Zealand
- Height: 179 cm (5 ft 10 in)
- Weight: 90 kg (198 lb; 14 st 2 lb)
- School: Whangārei Boys' High School
- University: Massey University

Rugby union career
- Position: Half-back
Senior career
Years	Team	Apps	(Points)
2003–08	Northampton	152	(245)
2008–10	London Wasps	24	(5)
Provincial / State sides
Years	Team	Apps	(Points)
1996–02	North Harbour	74	(150)
Super Rugby
Years	Team	Apps	(Points)
1997–98	Waikato Chiefs	12	(10)
1999–02	Blues	39	(40)
International career
Years	Team	Apps	(Points)
1997–01	New Zealand A	8	(15)
1997–01	New Zealand	8	(5)
- Correct as of 8 February 2007
- Rugby league career

Playing information
- Position: Hooker
Club
Years	Team	Pld	T	G	FG	P
2003	New Zealand Warriors	1				0

Mark Darren "Sharky" Robinson (born 21 August 1975 in Palmerston North, New Zealand) is a New Zealand former rugby union and rugby league footballer who played in the 1990s and 2000s. He played international rugby union for the All Blacks between 1997 and 2001. He played provincial rugby in New Zealand for North Harbour and Super 12 rugby for the Waikato Chiefs and then the Auckland Blues. He briefly played rugby league for the New Zealand Warriors before moving overseas to play with Northampton and then London Wasps, both in England. He retired from professional rugby in 2010.

== Career in rugby union and rugby league ==
Born in Palmerston North, Robinson grew up in Whangārei. He emerged as a prospective rugby player when he moved to North Harbour during his teenage years, making the Harbour Colts and New Zealand Colts in 1995 playing in the inaugural World under 21 tournament in Argentina. He entered first-class rugby the following year with Harbour. He played for the Chiefs in the international Super 12 competition.

He was selected for the 1997 New Zealand rugby union tour of Britain and Ireland and played three games as well as being selected to be reserve to Justin Marshall for the final test against England at Twickenham, before injury forced him to sit this out. The following year he played in his first Test against England in Dunedin, for England's Tour of Hell.

In 1999 he moved to the re-organised Auckland Blues, and appeared five times for New Zealand 'A' that season. In 2000 he also played for the New Zealand 'A' side that toured Europe. In 2001 he was recalled to the All Blacks for the 2001 end-of-year tour to Ireland, Scotland and Argentina. He played in matches against Ireland and Scotland 'A', as well as the Test against Scotland. He also played in the Test against Argentina.

In 2003 he signed to play rugby league for the New Zealand Warriors for only one season prior to moving to the UK to join up with the Northampton Saints. He played one game at hooker. For most of the year he played for the North Harbour Tigers in the 2005 Bartercard Cup. He also played for the Barbarians from 2002 to 2009 playing a total of 13 games for the famous rugby club and in 2003 Robinson was a member of the Barbarians team in the victories over England, Scotland and Wales.

In 2003 he signed for Northampton in the English Premiership, and on 22 May 2008 he transferred to London Wasps.

In May 2010 Robinson called time on his rugby career after a degenerative knee injury forced him to retire after two seasons at the Wasps. He said "It has been a very difficult season for me and despite every effort to come back, my knee injury is just too severe and too painful to continue".

== All Blacks statistics ==
Tests: 3 (0 as Captain)
Games: 5 (0 as Captain)
Total Matches: 8 (0 as Captain)
Test Points: 5pts (1t, 0c, 0p, 0dg, 0m)
Game Points: 10pts (2t, 0c, 0p, 0dg, 0m)
Total Points: 15pts (3t, 0c, 0p, 0dg, 0m)
