= 1973 Campeonato Argentino de Rugby =

29° Campeonato Argentino
- Countries: Argentina
- Number of teams: 15
- Champions: Buenos Aires (11th title)
- Runners-up: Rosario

The 1973 Campeonato Argentino de Rugby was won by the selection of Buenos Aires that beat in the final the selection of Unión de Rugby de Rosario

== That year in Argentina rugby union ==
=== National ===
- Nel 1973 was played the first Argentine championship for club, precursor of the Nacional de Clubes, that will start definitely in 1993. This tournament was won by Marista Rugby Club of Mendoza.
- The selection of Buenos Aires won also the second edition of "Campeonato Juvenil" (under-19).
- The Buenos Aires Championship was won by San Isidro Club
- The Cordoba Province Championship was won by Córdoba Athletic
- The North-East Championship was won by Uni Tucuman and Lawn Tennis
- The rugby suffered the turmoils of the Argentine political situation: in the days of the return in Argentina of Peron: in March there were a discussion between the U.A.R and the government that in 1971 didn't allow to the "Pumas" to visit Rhodesia, cause the racial politics of that country, and then contested to UAR the permit gave to San Isidro Club to visit the same country. The federal committee of UAR resigned and a new election was held on 24 April 1973. In November the government also forbid all the visit to South Africa to any Argentine team.

=== International ===
- On 13 July the Rugby Union cancelled the tour of English team, originally scheduled for August–September. The decision was made after the Ezeiza massacre, cause the flair of terror attacks.

The UAR contested the decision and the RFU offered to play a match in Twickenham on 1 December, at the end of the Argentina's tour of Scotland and Ireland, but the UAR refuse this proposal considering the decision "unilateral, hasty, and based on wrong information about the situation of Argentine Republic ... "-

The tour were replaced with by a tour of Romania. The UAR, as retaliation, forbid to any Club o Provincial selection to visit England

- At the end of the year, Argentina visit for the first time Europe with a tour in Scotland and Ireland.

== Knock out stages ==
1st PRELIMINARY
24 June	Noreste	-	Santa Fe	15 - 22	Resistencia
24 June	Tucumán	-	Jujuy	51 - 18	San Miguel de Tucumàn
24 June	Cuyo	-	San Juan	45 - 4	Mendoza
24 June	Sur	-	Mar del Plata	9 - 15	Bahía Blanca

2nd PRELIMINARY
15 July	Santa Fe	-	Rosario	4 - 17	Paranà
15 July	Salta	-	Tucumán	18 - 14	Salta
15 July	Cuyo	-	Chubut	86 - 3	Mendoza
15 July	Mar del Plata	-	Austral	0 - 60	Mar del Plata

,

QUARTERS OF FINALS
9 July	Rio Negro y Neuquén	-	Buenos Aires	0 - 95	Neuquén
29 July	Rosario	-	Salta	18 - 3	Rosario
29 July	Cuyo	-	Mar del Plata	7 - 3	Mendoza

=== Semifinals ===
Sistema di punteggio: meta = 4 punti, Trasformazione=2 punti .Punizione and calcio da mark= 3 punti. drop = 3 punti.

17 August 1973

Buenos Aires	28-9	Rosario
Try: Altberg 2, Matarazzo, Gradín; Con: Porta 3 Pen: Porta, Drop: Porta		Try: Castagna; Con: Escalante; Pen: Rodríguez

Córdoba, ArgentinaCordoba
Referee: Hugo Girolano (Mendoza)

Buenos Aires :Dudley Morgan, Alejandro Altberg, Arturo Rodríguez Jurado, Roberto Matarazzo, Eduardo Morgan, Hugo Porta, Luis Gradín, Jorge Carracedo, Hugo Miguens, Miguel Iglesias, José Virasoro, José Fernández, Mario Carluccio, Juan Dumas, Fernando Insúa.
Rosario: Angel Rodríguez, Carlos García, Ricardo Muzzio, César Blanco, Andrés Knight, Javier Escalante, Ricardo Castagna, Eduardo Mainini, Ricardo Covella, Víctor Macat, Osvaldo Galesio, Juan Mangiamelli, Alejandro Risler, José Costanté, Miguel Senatore.

17 August 1973

Cordoba	9-15	Cuyo
Try: Bergallo; Con: Bernis Sales; Pen: Bernis Sales		Try: Dorá 2, Fariello; Pen: Chacón

Cordoba
Referee: Florencio Varela (Buenos Aires)

Cordoba: E. Mezquida, C. Pispiero, J. Martínez, N. Trebuq, D. Clavería, M. Bernis Sales, C. Bergallo, R. Byleveld, L. Domínguez, C. Cotonaro, R. Campra, R. Passaglia, J. Ruggero, H. Bianchi, A. Cossini.
Cuyo:' J. Castro, C. Dorá, O. Terranova, D. Muñiz, M. Brandi, C. Navesi, L. Chacón, J. Navesi, J. Nasazzi, R. Ituarte, R. Cattáneo, E. Sánchez, R. Fariello, L. M. Ramos, J. Cribelli.

=== Final ===
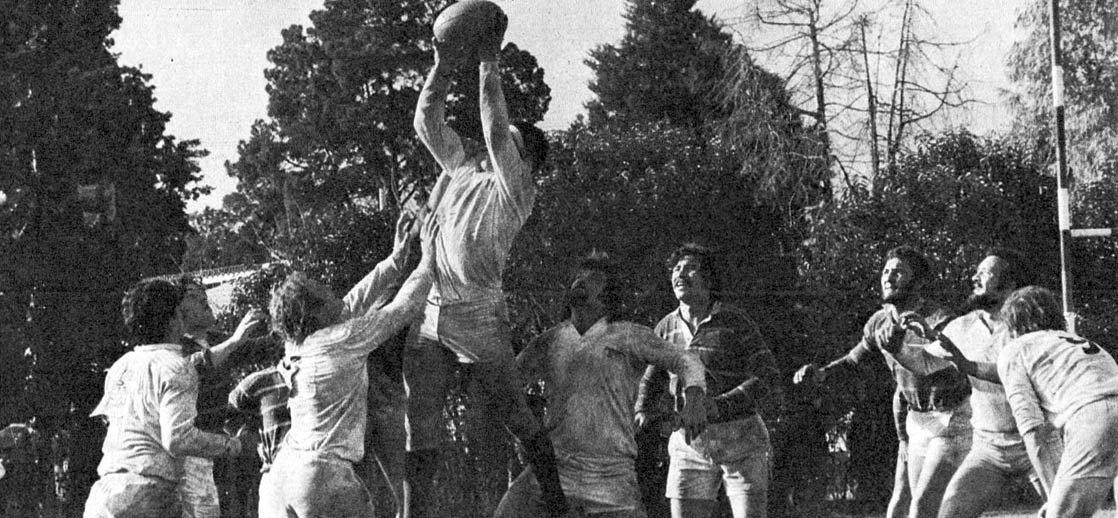
A moment of the final held in Córdoba A.C.

19 August 1973

Buenos Aires	14–0	Cuyo
Try: Matarazzo 2 E. Morgan; Con: Hugo Porta

Córdoba A.C. Stadium, Córdoba
Referee: Eduardo Niño (Buenos Aires)

Buenos Aires :Dudley Morgan, Roberto Matarazzo, Alejandro Travaglini, Arturo Rodríguez jurado, Eduardo Morgan, Hugo Porta, Luis Gradín, Miguel Iglesias, Hugo Miguens, Jorge Carracedo, José Virasoro, José Fernández, Mario Carluccio, Juan Dumas, Fernando Insúa.
Cuyo : Ernesto Naveyra, Julio Villanueva, Ricardo Tarquini, Daniel Muñiz, Miguel Brandi, Carlos Navesi, Luis Chacón, Luis Crivelli, Luis Ramos, Roberto Fariello, Eduardo Sánchez, Alfredo Cattáneo, Jorge Navesi, Jorge Nasazzi, Raúl Ituarte.

== Bibliography ==
- (in Spanish) Memorias de la UAR 1973
- (in Spanish) XXIX Campeonato Argentino
