= Admiral Brown Cup =

Rugby union competition between Argentina and Ireland

- The trophy awarded
- Sport: Rugby union
- Instituted: 2012; 14 years ago
- Number of teams: 2
- Country: Argentina; Ireland
- Holders: Ireland (2026)
- Most titles: Ireland (7 titles)

The Admiral William Brown Cup (in Spanish: Copa Almirante Brown) is an international rugby union competition contested between Argentina and Ireland. It was first held on 16 November 2012 at the Aviva Stadium. The trophy is named after Admiral William Brown, the Irish-Argentine born in Foxford, Co Mayo in 1777, who founded the Argentine Navy.

This competition was born after a joint initiative involving the Embassy of Argentina in Dublin, the Embassy of Ireland in Buenos Aires, the Argentine Rugby Union and the Irish Rugby Football Union.

== Summary ==
=== Overall ===
Host	Matches	Argentina won	Ireland won	Draws	Arg. points	Ire. points
Argentina	2	0	2	0	34	52
Ireland	6	0	6	0	98	219
Overall	8	0	8	0	132	271

=== Records ===
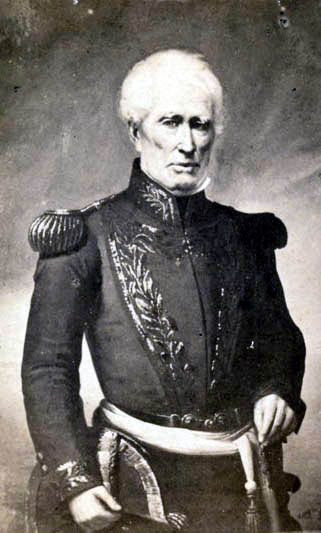
The trophy was named after Irish Admiral William Brown, founder of the Argentine Navy

Note: Date shown in brackets indicates when the record was or last set.

Record	Argentina	Ireland
Longest winning streak	—N/a	8 (16 Nov 2012–present)
Largest points for
Home	17 (7 June 2014)	53 (21 November 2021)
Away	24 (16 November 2012)	29 (7 June 2014)
Largest winning margin
Home	—N/a	46 (21 November 2021)
Away	—N/a	12 (7 June 2014)

== Results ==
- ST – Mid-year rugby union internationals
- AI – End-of-year rugby union internationals

Year	Date	Venue	Home	Score	Away	Trophy Winner
2012	16 November	Aviva Stadium, Dublin	Ireland	46–24	Argentina	Ireland
2014	7 June	Estadio Centenario, Resistencia	Argentina	17–29	Ireland	Ireland
2014	14 June	Estadio José Fierro, Tucumán	Argentina	17–23	Ireland	Ireland
2017	25 November	Aviva Stadium, Dublin	Ireland	28–19	Argentina	Ireland
2018	10 November	Aviva Stadium, Dublin	Ireland	28–17	Argentina	Ireland
2021	21 November	Aviva Stadium, Dublin	Ireland	53–7	Argentina	Ireland
2024	15 November	Aviva Stadium, Dublin	Ireland	22–19	Argentina	Ireland
2026	6 November	Aviva Stadium, Dublin	Ireland	42–12	Argentina	Ireland

== See also ==
- History of rugby union matches between Argentina and Ireland
