= Carlos Huntley-Robertson =

Argentine rugby union player (1908–1982)

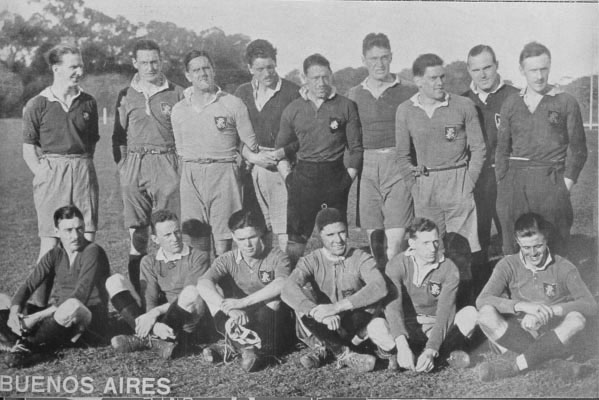
- Buenos Aires team in 1922
- Born: Carlos Alfredo Huntley Robertson; 23 March 1908 Lima, Peru
- Died: 1982 (aged 74) Surrey, England

Rugby union career
Amateur team(s)
| Years | Team | Apps | (Points) |
- Buenos Aires Cricket & Rugby Club
International career
| Years | Team | Apps | (Points) |
| 1932 1936 (Coach) | Argentina | | |

Charles Alfred Huntley-Robertson (born Carlos Alfredo Huntley Robertson; 23 March 1908 – 1982) was a British-Argentine rugby union player. He was the Captain of Los Pumas in 1932.

== Career ==
Huntley-Robertson was born in Lima, Peru, to a South American mother, Alida Pendavis, and Capt. James Huntley-Robertson, who was born in Miraflores, Mexico to a Scottish father, John Moir Robertson, and Peruvian mother, Paz Besseser de Robertson. James Huntley-Robertson served with the 2nd Mounted Infantry Contingent from Western Australia and the Bushveldt Carbineers in the Second Boer War, and then worked on the railways in Chile, Peru and Argentina prior to the First World War, when he was awarded the Military Cross for his service in the Battle of the Somme.

Though he was born Carlos Alfredo, he used the name Charles Alfred. He started his rugby playing career at Buenos Aires Cricket & Rugby Club.

On July 16, 1932, Huntley-Robertson made its debut in the Argentina national team, playing his first Test match against South Africa, with a score 42-0 in favor of the Springboks. On July 23, had played their second game against the Springboks with a victory of South African team by 34-3. Both matches were played at the stadium of the Club Ferro Carril Oeste.

In 1936, Huntley-Robertson was the Coach of the national team together Luis Cilley and Edmundo Stanfield.

In 1940, Huntley-Robertson married Barbara Hiroth Verity in London.
