= History of rugby union matches between Argentina and Ireland =

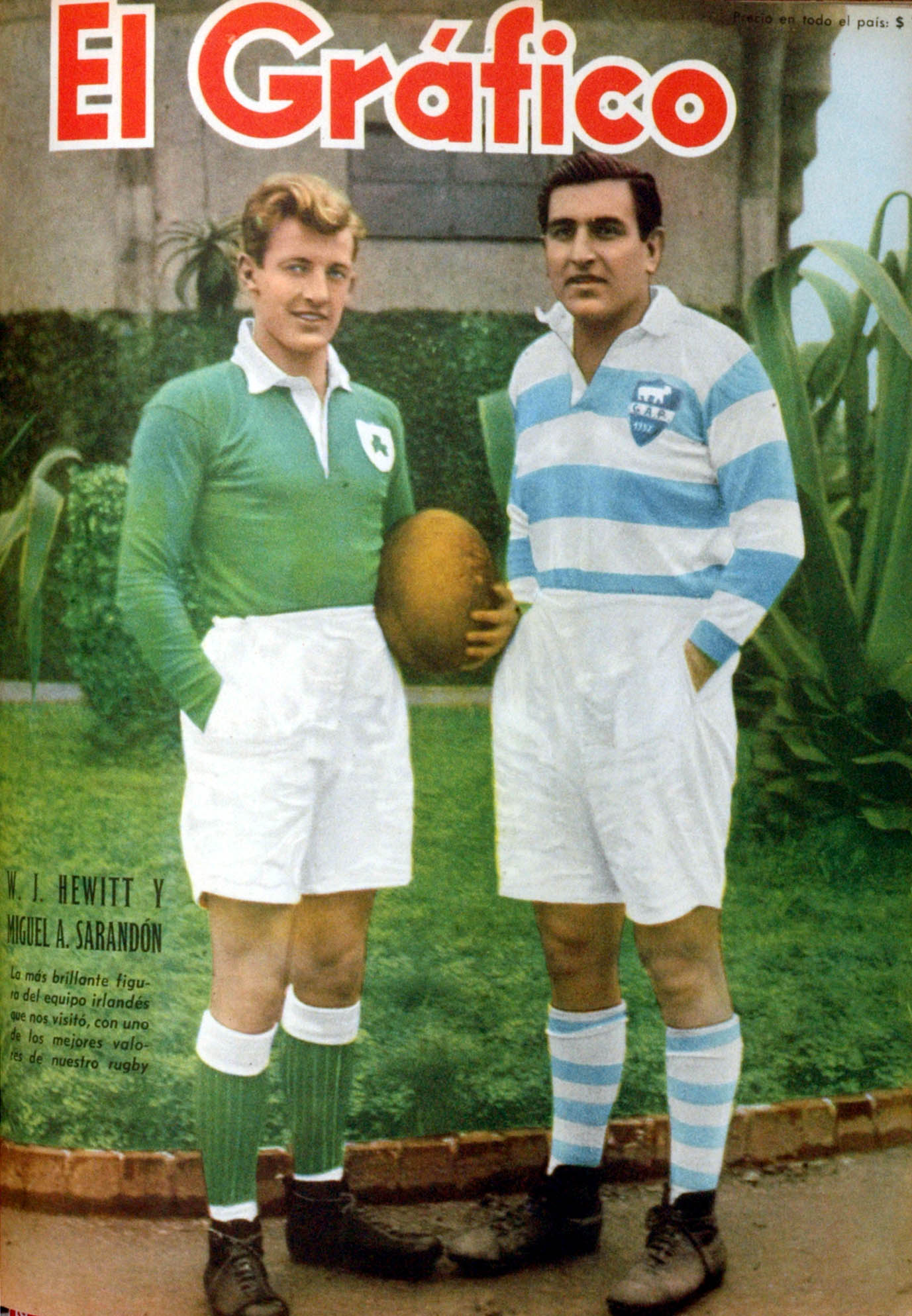
Captains W. J. Hewitt of Ireland and Miguel Ángel Sarandón of Argentina appear on the cover of El Gráfico prior to their 1952 matchup

The history of rugby union matches between Argentina and Ireland is one of an even contest and significant mutual rivalry, increased by a series of notable meetings at the Rugby World Cup.

As of November 2026, in the twenty-one matches since 1990 which are counted as full internationals by both sides, Argentina have won six times and Ireland fifteen times. The five matches played between 1952 and 1973 are not regarded as full internationals by Ireland, but are by Argentina. In these matches each side has two wins, with one match drawn. At the end of the 2010 Autumn Internationals there was only a nineteen-point difference in cumulative points scored. The largest winning margin of 23 points for Argentina was recorded in the meeting of their 2015 Rugby World Cup quarter-final, when Argentina won by 43 points to 20. Ireland's largest winning margin is 46 points, which occurred in November 2021.

Argentina have yet to beat Ireland on Irish soil, and Ireland have only won twice in Argentina. Ireland's first win against Argentina was in 1952, however it was only a capped match for Argentina. Ireland's first fully test capped away win in Argentina came in 2014. Since 2012 matches between the two teams, with the exception of World Cup matches, have been held for the Admiral Brown Cup. As of November 2024 Ireland have won the cup on six occasions and Argentina have yet to win.

== Summary ==
Note: Summary below reflects test results by both teams.

=== Overall ===
Details	Played	Won by Argentina	Won by Ireland	Drawn	Argentina points	Ireland points
In Argentina	5	3	2	0	106	95
In Ireland	12	0	12	0	178	354
Neutral venue	4	3	1	0	116	75
Overall	21	6	15	0	400	524

=== Records ===
Note: Date shown in brackets indicates when the record was or last set.

Record	Argentina	Ireland
Longest winning streak	3 (26 May 2007 – 22 November 2008)	5 (25 November 2017 – present)
Largest points for
Home	34 (3 June 2000)	53 (21 November 2021)
Away	24 (28 August 1999, 24 November 2012)	29 (7 June 2014)
Neutral	43 (18 October 2015)	24 (20 October 1999)
Largest winning margin
Home	16 (2 June 2007)	46 (21 November 2021)
Away	—N/a	12 (7 June 2014)
Neutral	23 (18 October 2015)	1 (26 October 2023)

=== Attendance ===
Up to date as of 6 November 2026.

Total attendance*	781,448
Average attendance*	41,129
Highest attendance	72,316; Ireland 20–43 Argentina; 18 October 2015
*Excludes two matches in which no attendance was reported

== Results ==
No.	Date	Venue	Score	Winner	Competition	Attendance	Ref.
1	27 October 1990	Lansdowne Road, Dublin	20–18	Ireland	1990 Argentina tour of Great Britain and Ireland	—N/a	
2	28 August 1999	Lansdowne Road, Dublin	32–24	Ireland	1999 Rugby World Cup warm-up match	15,000	
3	20 October 1999	Stade Félix Bollaert, Lens (France)	28–24	Argentina	1999 Rugby World Cup	22,000	
4	3 June 2000	Estadio Arquitecto Ricardo Etcheverri, Buenos Aires	34–23	Argentina	2000 Ireland tour of North and South America	25,000	
5	23 November 2002	Lansdowne Road, Dublin	16–7	Ireland	2002 Autumn International	40,000	
6	26 October 2003	Adelaide Oval, Adelaide (Australia)	16–15	Ireland	2003 Rugby World Cup	30,203	
7	27 November 2004	Lansdowne Road, Dublin	21–19	Ireland	2004 Autumn International	49,250	
8	26 May 2007	Estadio Brigadier General Estanislao López, Santa Fe	22–20	Argentina	2007 Ireland tour of Argentina	26,000	
9	2 June 2007	Estadio José Amalfitani, Buenos Aires	16–0	Argentina	2007 Ireland tour of Argentina	44,000	
10	30 September 2007	Parc des Princes, Paris (France)	30–15	Argentina	2007 Rugby World Cup	45,450	
11	22 November 2008	Croke Park, Dublin	17–3	Ireland	2008 Autumn International	68,352	
12	28 November 2010	Aviva Stadium, Dublin	29–9	Ireland	2010 Autumn International	30,406	
13	24 November 2012	Aviva Stadium, Dublin	46–24	Ireland	2012 Autumn International	43,406	
14	7 June 2014	Estadio Centenario, Resistencia	17–29	Ireland	2014 Ireland tour of Argentina	21,000	
15	14 June 2014	Estadio Monumental José Fierro, Tucumán	17–23	Ireland	2014 Ireland tour of Argentina	—N/a	
16	18 October 2015	Millennium Stadium, Cardiff (Wales)	20–43	Argentina	2015 Rugby World Cup	72,316	
17	25 November 2017	Aviva Stadium, Dublin	28–19	Ireland	2017 Autumn International	51,000	
18	10 November 2018	Aviva Stadium, Dublin	28–17	Ireland	2018 Autumn International	51,700	
19	21 November 2021	Aviva Stadium, Dublin	53–7	Ireland	2021 Autumn International	45,500	
20	15 November 2024	Aviva Stadium, Dublin	22–19	Ireland	2024 Autumn International	51,700	
21	6 November 2026	Aviva Stadium, Dublin	42–12	Ireland	2026 Nations Championship	49,165	

== XV results ==
Below is a list of matches that Argentina has awarded matches test match status by virtue of awarding caps, but Ireland did not award caps.

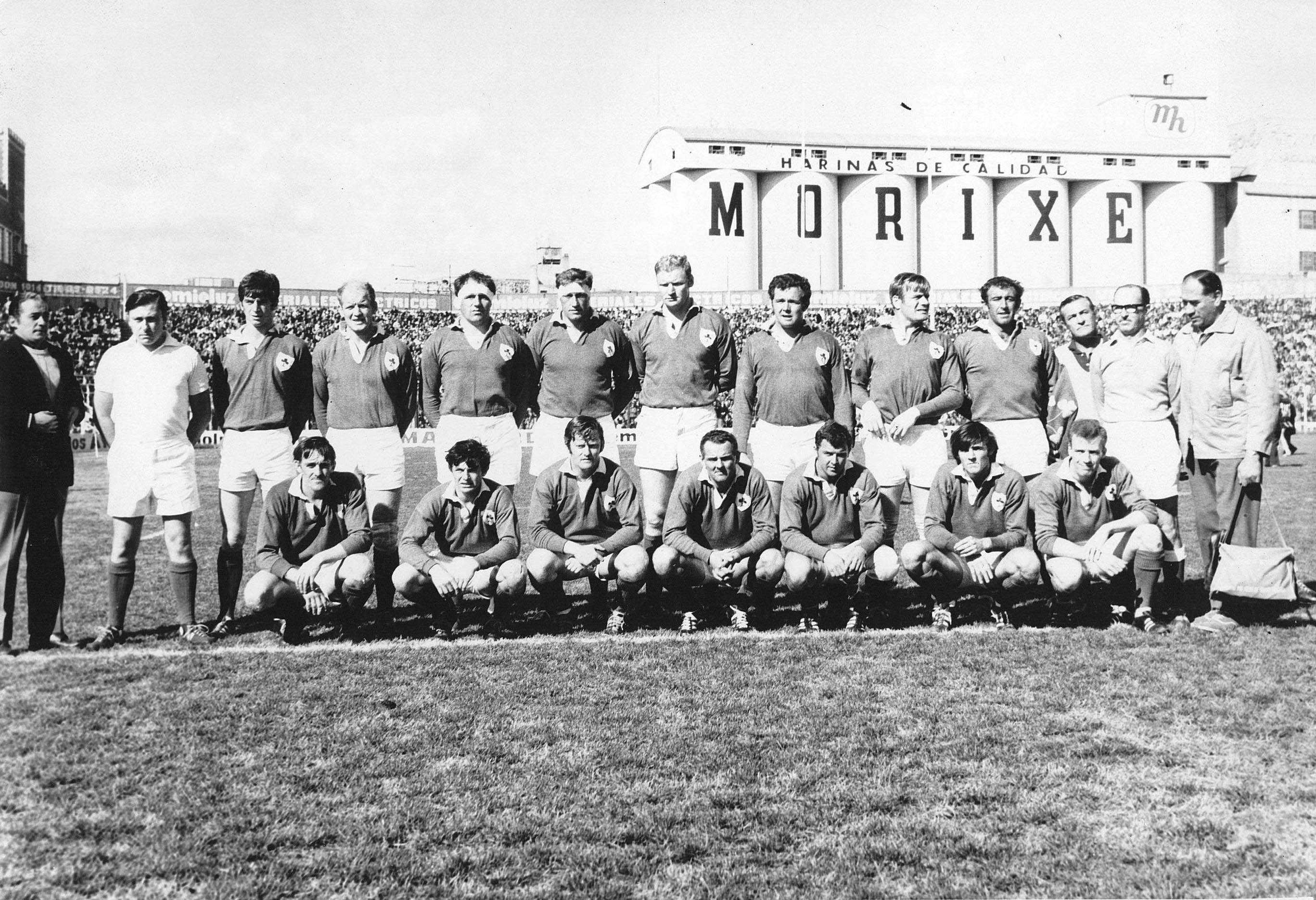
Ireland team before their 1970 match with Argentina

No.	Date	Venue	Score	Winner	Competition	Ref.
I	24 August 1952	Estadio G.E.B.A., Buenos Aires	3–3	draw	1952 Ireland XV tour of Argentina and Chile	
II	31 August 1952	Estadio G.E.B.A., Buenos Aires	0–6	Ireland XV	1952 Ireland XV tour of Argentina and Chile	
III	13 September 1970	Estadio Ricardo Etcheverry, Buenos Aires	8–3	Argentina	1970 Ireland XV tour of Argentina	
IV	20 September 1970	Estadio Arquitecto Ricardo Etcheverri, Buenos Aires	6–3	Argentina	1970 Ireland XV tour of Argentina	
V	10 November 1973	Lansdowne Road, Dublin	21–8	Ireland XV	1973 Argentina tour of Ireland and Scotland	

== List of series ==
Played	Won by Argentina	Won by Ireland	Drawn
2	1	1	0

Year	Argentina	Australia	Series winner	Admiral Brown Cup
2007	2	0	Argentina	N/A
2014	0	2	Ireland	
