= Héctor Méndez (rugby union) =

Argentine rugby union footballer and coach

Héctor Mendéz is an Argentine former rugby union footballer and coach. He works as a psychiatrist.

He had 2 caps for Argentina, in 1967, scoring 1 try, 4 points in aggregate. He was nominated joint-coach, with New Zealand Alex Wyllie, of the "Pumas", previously of the 1999 Rugby World Cup finals, but he resigned few days later.
