= History of rugby union matches between Argentina and the British & Irish Lions =

Meetings between the rugby union teams of Argentina and British & Irish Lions are not held in regular intervals. The Lions team went to Argentina three times in the early twentieth century, in 1910, 1927 and 1936. The next time those two teams met was nearly seventy years later in a single match played in Cardiff in May 2005. Argentina would achieve its first victory against the Lions in Dublin in June 2025. From a total of eight games, there was one win for Argentina, one draw and the rest were won by the Lions.

== Summary ==
Note: Summary below reflects test results by both teams.

=== Overall ===
Details	Played	Won by Argentina	Won by Lions	Drawn	Argentina points	Lions points
In Argentina	6	0	6	0	6	211
In Great Britain or Ireland	2	1	0	1	53	49
Neutral venue	0	0	0	0	0	0
Overall	8	1	6	1	59	260

=== Records ===
Note: Date shown in brackets indicates when the record was last set.

Record	Argentina	Lions
Longest winning streak	1 (20 June 2025 – present)	6 (12 June 1910 – 23 May 2005)
Largest points for
Home	3 (12 Jun 1910 & 14 Aug 1927)	25 (23 May 2025)
Away	28 (20 June 2005)	46 (7 August 1927)
Largest winning margin
Home	—N/a	—N/a
Away	4 (20 June 2025)	46 (7 August 1927)

== Results ==
No.	Date	Venue	Score	Winner	Competition	Attendance	Ref.
1	12 June 1910	Sociedad Sportiva Argentina, Buenos Aires	3–28	British & Irish Lions	1910 British Lions tour of Argentina		
2	31 July 1927	Gimnasia y Esgrima, Buenos Aires	0–37	British & Irish Lions	1927 British Lions tour of Argentina		
3	7 August 1927	Gimnasia y Esgrima, Buenos Aires	0–46	British & Irish Lions	1927 British Lions tour of Argentina		
4	14 August 1927	Gimnasia y Esgrima, Buenos Aires	3–34	British & Irish Lions	1927 British Lions tour of Argentina		
5	21 August 1927	Gimnasia y Esgrima, Buenos Aires	0–43	British & Irish Lions	1927 British Lions tour of Argentina		
6	16 August 1936	Gimnasia y Esgrima, Buenos Aires	0–23	British & Irish Lions	1936 British Lions tour of Argentina		
7	23 May 2005	Millennium Stadium, Cardiff	25–25	draw	2005 British & Irish Lions tour of New Zealand	61,569	
8	20 June 2025	Aviva Stadium, Dublin	28–24	Argentina	2025 British & Irish Lions tour of Australia	51,700	
