= 1973 Argentina rugby union tour of Ireland and Scotland =

Summary
P	W	D	L
Total
8	2	2	4
Test match
2	0	0	2
Opponent
P	W	D	L
Ireland XV
1	0	0	1
Scotland XV
1	0	0	1

The 1973 Argentina rugby union tour of Scotland and Ireland was a series of eight matches played by the Argentina national rugby union team (the Pumas) in Scotland and Ireland in October and November 1973. The Pumas won only of two of their matches, lost four and drew the others; they lost both of their international matches, against Ireland and Scotland. Neither Ireland nor Scotland regarded the matches as full internationals and did not award caps for the games.

A Match in England was cancelled after that in May the Rugby Football Union cancelled a tour of the English national team in Argentina, worried about the political situation in the South American country.

== Results ==
31 October 1973

Munster	12–12	Argentina
Pen: Mac Gann 4		Pen: Morgan 3 Drop: Porta

Thomond Park, Limerick
Referee: Alan Sturgeon (Ireland)

Munster: D.Spring; P.Pratt, P.Parfrey, S.Dennison, P.Lavery; B.Mc Gann (capt.), D.Canniffe; J.Buckley, T.Moore, S.Deering; M.Keane, B.Foley; J.Me Loughlin, P.Wheland, P.O'Callaghan.
Argentina: Arturo Rodríguez Jurado; Eduardo Morgan, Roberto Matarazzo, Alejandro Travaglini, Guillermo Pérez Leirós; Hugo Porta, Adolfo Etchegaray; Jorge Carracedo, Raul Sanz, Hugo Miguens (capt.); José Virasoro, José Javier Fernández; Fernando Insúa, Guillermo Casas, Mario Carluccio.

3 November 1973

Ulster	23–13	Argentina
Try: Mac Master, Miles, Milliken, Con: Mc Kinney; Pen: Mc Kinney 3		Try: Travaglini, Pen: Morgan 3

Ravenhill, Belfast
Referee: Norman Sanson (Scotland)

Ulster: G.Crothers; J.Miles.R.Patterson, R.Milliken, W.Mac Mas¬ter; A.Harrison, W.Oakes; A.S.Mac Kinney, H.Steele, J.Davison; R.Hakin, W.J.McBride (capt.); R.Clegg, K.Kennedy, P.Aghew.
Argentina: Alonso; R.Matarazzo, A.Travaglini, A.Rodriguez Jurado, E.Morgan; T.Harris Smith, L.Gradín; J.Carracedo, H.Miguens (capt.), N.Carbone; J.Virasoro, J.Fernández; M.Carluccio, J.Dumas, R.Faríello.

6 November 1973

Connacht	7–16	Argentina
Try: Smyth; Pen: Smyth		Try: Matarazzo, Miguens; Alonso, Etchegaray

Sportsgrounds, Galway
Referee: M. Healy

Connacht: T.Corley; P.Flynn, N.Jennings, J.Kerin, M.Connolly; C.Smyth, M.Mahoney; T.Cuningham, M.Casserley, M.Staple¬ton; M.Me Hugh, L.Galvin (capt.); D.Frawley, B.Troy, P.Me Loughlin.
Argentina: Martin Alonso; Alejandero Altberg, Roberto Matarazzo, Arturo Rodriguez Jurado, Eduardo Morgan; Hugo Porta (Tomas Harrís Smíth), Adolfo Etchegaray; José Javier Fernández, Hugo Miguens (capt.), Nestor Carbone; Carlos Bottarini, José Virasoro; Fernando Insúa, Guillermo Casas, Roberto Fariello.

10 November 1973

Ireland	21–8	Argentina
Try: Slattery, Quinn, Grace, Mac Master; Con: Mc Bride; Drop: Quinn,		Try: P.Leirós, Porta

Lansdowne Road, Dublin
Referee: RF Johnson (England)

Ireland
Argentina

Ireland XV			Argentina
Tony Ensor	FB	15	FB	Arturo Rodriguez Jurado
Tom Grace	W	14	W	Guillermo Perez Leiros
Richard Milliken	C	13	C	Roberto Matarazzo
Seamus Dennison	C	12	C	Alejandro Travaglini
Wallace McMaster	W	11	W	Eduardo Morgan
Mick Quinn	FH	10	FH	Hugo Porta
John Moloney	SH	9	SH	Adolfo Etchegaray
Terry Moore	N8	8	N8	Hugo Miguens (capt.)
Fergus Slattery	F	7	F	Nestor Carbone
Shay Deering	F	6	F	Jorge Carracedo
Leo Galvin	L	5	L	Carlos Bottarini
(capt.) Willie John McBride	L	4	L	José Javier Fernandez
Ray McLoughlin	P	3	P	Fernando Insua
Ken Kennedy	H	2	H	Guillermo Casas
Roger Clegg	P	1	P	Mario Carluccio

14 November 1973

Glasgow-Edinburgh	18–13	Argentina
Try: Irvine 2 Con: Doug Morgan 2 Pen: Doug Morgan 2		Try: E.Morgan, Gradín; Con: E.Morgan, 1 Pen: E.Morgan,

Hughenden, Glasgow
Referee: K.Clark

Glasgow-Edinburgh: A.Irvine; R.Hannah, M.Hunter, I.Forisyth, L.Dick (G.Hogg); D.Reid, D.W.Morgan; G.Strachan (A.Fraser), W.Watson, J.Dixon; R.Wright, G.Brown; A.B.Carmichael, R.Balfour, A.Wilson.

Argentina: Martin Alonso; Alejandro Altberg, Roberto Matarazzo, Alejandro Travaglini, Eduardo Morgan; Tomas Harris Smith, Luis Gradín; Jorge Carracedo, Raul Sanz, Hugo Miguens (capt.); José Virasoro, José Javier Fernández; Roberto Fariello, Juan Dumas, Mario Carluccio (Fernando Insúa).

17 November 1973

South of Scotland	16–16	Argentina
Try: penalty try, Telfer; Con: Brown; Pen: Brown 2		Try: Morgan . Pen: Morgan 4

Mansfield Park, Hawick
Referee: F. Palmade

South of Scotland A.Brown A.Gill, J.Renwick, A.Cronston, A.White; C.Telfer, R.Laidlaw; C.Hegarty, C.Oliver, W.Davies; H.Bar¬nes, J.Scott; E.Pender, C.Anderson, N.Suddon

Argentina: Martin Alonso; Alejandro Travaglini, Andrés Brown (Roberto Matarazzo), Arturo Rodríguez Jurado, Eduardo Morgan; Tomas Harris Smith, Luis Gradín; Nestor.Carbone, Raul Sanz, Hugo Miguens (capt.); José Javier Fernández, José Virasoro; Roberto Fariello, Juan Dumas, Martin Giargia (Fernando Insúa).

20 November 1973

North and Midlands	23–28	Argentina
Try: Leslie, Dunlop, Pen: Aitchison 5		Try: Gradín 2 Travaglini, Con: Morgan 2 Pen: Morgan 2 Drop: Porta 2

Aberdeen
Referee: M.Titcomb

North of Scotland: D.Aitchison; T.D.Dunlop, M.B.Paul, J.Adams, J.McGregory; D.Arneil e I.McRae; 1.Coull, David Leslie, Nairn McEwan; George Mackie, C.Snape; J.Braid, J.Hardie (S.Frazer), M.Clark.

Argentina: A.Rodríguez Jurado; G.Pérez Leirós, A.Travaglini, E.Morgan, L.Gradín; H.Porta, A.Etchegaray; J.Carracedo, H.Miguens (capt.), N.Carbone; C.Bottarini, J.Fernández; F.Insúa, G.Casas, R.Fariello.

24 November 1973

Scotland	12–11	Argentina
Pen: D.Morgan 3 Drop: Telfer		Try: Porta, Travaglini; Drop: Porta

Murrayfield, Edinburgh
Referee: J.Evans

Scotland
Argentina

Scotland XV			Argentina
Andy Irvine	FB	15	FB	Martin Alonso
William Steele	W	14	W	Roberto Matarazzo
Jim Renwick	C	13	C	Alejandro Travaglini
Michael Hunter	C	12	C	Arturo Rodriguez Jurado
Drew Gill	W	11	W	Eduardo Morgan
Colin Telfer	FH	10	FH	Hugo Porta
Dougie Morgan	SH	9	SH	Luis Gradin
William Watson	N8	8	N8	Hugo Miguens (capt.)
Nairn MacEwan	F	7	F	Nestor Carbone
Gordon Strachan	F	6	F	Jorge Carracedo
Alastair McHarg	L	5	L	Jose Virasoro
Gordon Brown	L	4	L	Jose Fernandez
(capt.) Ian McLauchlan	P	3	P	Fernando Insua
Duncan Madsen	H	2	H	Juan Dumas
Sandy Carmichael	P	1	P	Roberto Fariello
