= 2001 Argentina rugby union tour of New Zealand and Great Britain =

Summary
P	W	D	L
Total
4	2	0	2
Test match
1	0	0	1
Opponent
P	W	D	L
New Zealand
1	0	0	1

2001 Argentina rugby union tour of New Zealand and Great Britain
Summary
P	W	D	L
Total
4	3	0	1
Test match
2	2	0	2
Opponent
P	W	D	L
Wales
1	1	0	0
Scotland
1	1	0	0

The 2001 Argentina rugby union tour of Europe were two a series of matches played by the Argentina national rugby union team. The first tour (four match) was held in June, the second (four match) in November.

== Matches ==
Scores and results list Argentina's points tally first.

=== In New Zealand ===
Opponent	For	Against	Date	Venue	Status
Counties Manukau	70	26	17 June 2001	Pukekohe	Tour match
Thames Valley	26	12	19 June 2001	Paeroa	Tour match
New Zealand	19	67	23 June 2001	Christchurch	Test match
New Zealand Māori	24	43	26 June 2001	Rotorua	Tour match

=== In Great Britain ===
Opponent	For	Against	Date	Venue	Status
Wales A	30	14	6 November 2001	Sardis Road, Pontypridd	Tour match
Wales	30	16	10 November 2001	Millennium Stadium, Cardiff	Test match
Scotland A	35	40	14 November 2001	Philiphaugh Stadium, Selkirk	Tour match
Scotland	25	16	18 November 2001	Murrayfield Stadium, Edinburgh	Test match

== Sources ==
- Union Argentina de Rugby (January 2002). "MEMORIA Temporada año 2001" (.pdf) (in Spanish).
