= Gustavo Jorge =

Argentine rugby union player and coach

- Born: October 24, 1971 (age 55) Gustavo Martin Jorge

Rugby union career
- Position: Wing
Senior career
Years	Team	Apps	(Points)
- Club Pucará
- CASI
2007-2008	Club Pucará		
International career
Years	Team	Apps	(Points)
1989-1994	Argentina	23	(111)
National sevens team
Years	Team		Comps
- Argentina 7s

Gustavo Martín Jorge (born 24 October 1971 in Lomas de Zamora) is a former Argentine rugby union player and a current coach. He played as a wing.

He played for Club Pucará and Club Atletico San Isidro in the Nacional de Clubes in Argentina. He returned to Club Pucará where he finished his player career in 2007/08.

Jorge had 23 caps for Argentina, since his debut, at the 103-9 win over Brazil, at 8 October 1989, in Montevideo, for the South American Rugby Championship, when he was only 17 years old, making him the youngest ever player for the "Pumas". He scored 6 tries in that game. He scored 24 tries, 111 points on aggregate during his international career. He was called for the 1991 Rugby World Cup but he never played. His last game was at the 16-11 win over the United States, at 20 June 1994, in Buenos Aires, for the 1995 Rugby World Cup qualifyings. He was only 22 years old but did not play again for the "Pumas".

He has been a coach for the youth categories at Club Pucará since his retirement.
