= Leo Galvin =

Ireland international rugby union player

- School: Garbally College
- University: University College Dublin

Rugby union career
- Position: Lock
International career
Years	Team	Apps	(Points)
1973	Ireland	1	

Leo Galvin is an Irish former international rugby union player.

Galvin is a native of Taughmaconnell, County Roscommon, and was educated at Garbally College in Ballinasloe.

A second-rower, Galvin played his senior rugby with University College Dublin, Athlone and Connacht.

Galvin played once Ireland, when Argentina visited Dublin in 1973, but the match wasn't considered a full international until the IRFU retrospectively awarded him a cap 50-years later. This made him the first player from County Roscommon to make a capped appearance for Ireland.

== See also ==
- List of Ireland national rugby union players
