= 1997 Argentina rugby union tour of New Zealand =

Series of sporting events

Summary
P	W	D	L
Total
5	1	0	4
Test match
2	0	0	2
Opponent
P	W	D	L
New Zealand
2	0	0	2

The 1997 Argentina rugby union tour of New Zealand was a series of five matches played by the Argentina national rugby union team in June 1996. The young Argentinian team lost both test matches against the All Blacks.

== Matches ==
Scores and results list Argentina's points tally first.

Opposing Team	For	Against	Date	Venue	Status
New Zealand Māori	17	39	14/6/1997	Napier	Tour Match
Nelson/Marlborough	42	10	17/6/1997	Nelson	Tour Match
New Zealand	8	93	21/6/1997	Wellington	Test Match
Taranaki	10	26	24/6/1997	New Plymouth	Tour Match
New Zealand	10	62	28/6/1997	Hamilton	Test Match

== Sources ==
- Union Argentina de Rugby (January 1998). "MEMORIA Temporada año 1997" (.pdf) (in Spanish).
