= 2001 New Zealand rugby union tour =

Summary
P	W	D	L
Total
5	5	0	0
Test match
3	3	0	0
Opponent
P	W	D	L
Ireland
1	1	0	0
Scotland
1	1	0	0
Argentina
1	1	0	0

The 2001 New Zealand rugby union tour was a series of matches played in November–December 2001 in Ireland, Scotland and Argentina by New Zealand national rugby union team. This was iconically former All Blacks captain and most test capped player in history Richie McCaw's debut series for the New Zealand national rugby union team.

== Results ==
'Scores and results list New Zealand's points tally first.

Opposing Team	For	Against	Date	Venue	Status
Ireland A	43	30	13 November 2001	Ravenhill, Belfast	Tour match
Ireland	40	29	17 November 2001	Lansdowne Road, Dublin	Test match
Scotland A	35	13	20 November 2001	McDiarmid Park, Perth	Tour match
Scotland	37	6	24 November 2001	Murrayfield, Edinburgh	Test match
Argentina	24	20	1 December 2001	Monumental, Buenos Aires	Test match
