= Edmundo Stanfield =

Irish rugby union footballer (1902–60)

- Born: Edmund John Stanfield; 8 April 1902 Belfast, Ireland
- Died: 18 June 1960 (aged 58) Manchester, England

Rugby union career
- Position: fly-half
Amateur team(s)
Years	Team	Apps	(Points)
- CASI
International career
Years	Team	Apps	(Points)
- Argentina

Edmund John Stanfield (8 April 1902 – 18 June 1960), known in Argentina as Edmundo Stanfield, was an Irish rugby union footballer who played for Club Atlético San Isidro and the Argentina national rugby union team.

== Career ==
Stanfield played at fly-half for the CASI, where he had started his career in the late 1910s. In the Club Atlético San Isidro, he won several championships organized by the URBA.

Stanfield was a player and Coach of Los Pumas. He played his first test match against Springboks, on 16 July 1932. That same year Stanfield was appointed as Coach of the national team.
