= Eduardo Morgan =

Argentine rugby union footballer (died 2015)

Eduardo Morgan (died 2015) was an Argentine rugby union footballer. Morgan played twelve tests for the Argentina national rugby union team. Morgan played club rugby for Old Georgian Club before playing his first test match on 21 October 1972 against the South African Gazelles.
