= Argentina national rugby union team =

National sports team

Argentina
- Nickname: Los Pumas (The Pumas)
- Emblem: Puma
- Union: Argentine Rugby Union
- Head coach: Felipe Contepomi
- Captain: Julián Montoya
- Most caps: Pablo Matera (127)
- Top scorer: Nicolás Sánchez (899)
- Top try scorer: José María Núñez Piossek (30)
First colours	Second colours

World Rugby ranking
- Current: 7 (as of 13 July 2026)
- Highest: 3 (2008)
- Lowest: 12 (2014)

First international
- Argentina 3–28 British Isles (Buenos Aires, Argentina; 12 June 1910)

Biggest win
- Argentina 152–0 Paraguay (Mendoza, Argentina; 1 May 2002)

Biggest defeat
- New Zealand 93–8 Argentina (Wellington, New Zealand; 21 June 1997)

World Cup
- Appearances: 10 (first in 1987)
- Best result: Third place (2007)

Tri Nations/Rugby Championship
- Appearances: 12
- Best result: Runners-up (2020)
- Website: uar.com.ar/los-pumas

The Argentina national rugby union team (Spanish: Selección de rugby de Argentina) represents the Argentine Rugby Union in men's international competitions, The Argentine Rugby Union (Spanish: Unión Argentina de Rugby). Officially nicknamed Los Pumas, they play in sky blue and white jerseys. They are ranked 8th in the world by World Rugby, making them by some distance the highest-ranked nation in the Americas.

Argentina played its first international rugby match in 1910 against a touring British Isles team. Argentina has competed at every Rugby World Cup since the first tournament of 1987 and are considered by far the strongest team within the Americas, being undefeated against all but Canada, against whom they have suffered two losses.

The Pumas' impressive results since the 1999 World Cup have seen rugby's popularity in Argentina grow significantly. They have achieved several upset victories and are capable of regularly defeating Six Nations sides. In the 2007 Rugby World Cup, Argentina were undefeated in their pool and reached the semi-finals for the first time; they were defeated by South Africa in the semi-finals, but followed up with a win over France to claim third place overall. By the end of the competition, the team had reached an all-time high of third in the World Rankings.

After their advances in competitiveness and performance during the 2000s, coupled with their location in the Southern Hemisphere, Argentina was the only tier 1 nation that had no regular competition. Argentina officially joined the Rugby Championship on 23 November 2011. In their first tournament in 2012, Argentina secured a 16–16 draw with The Springboks in only their second game.

The 2014 Rugby Championship saw the first Championship-match win for Argentina who defeated Australia 21–17. 2015 proved to be a successful year for Argentine rugby, including their first ever win over South Africa in the Rugby Championship, and they reached another semi-final at the 2015 Rugby World Cup. In the 2016 Rugby Championship, the Pumas again defeated the Springboks. Although winless during the 2017 Rugby Championship, the Pumas achieved two wins in their 2018 campaign, defeating both South Africa and Australia. On 14 November 2020, the Pumas beat New Zealand 25–15 to record their first win over the All Blacks, and on August 27, 2022, they defeated the All Blacks for the first time in New Zealand. The wins against New Zealand meant that Los Pumas had finally won a match against every major Rugby union team. In the 2024 Rugby Championship, the Pumas first achieved wins against all three rivals in the same year, including a win against number one ranked South Africa.

== History ==
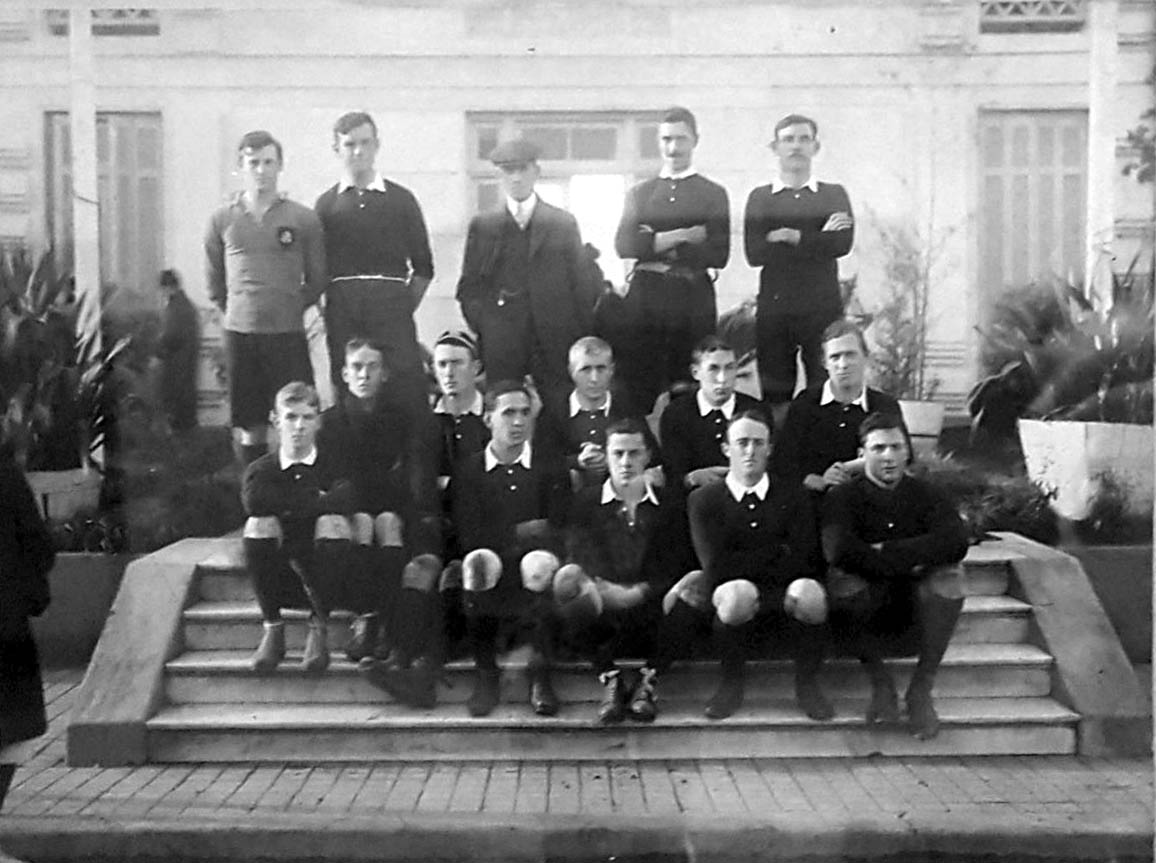
The first Argentina national team ever before playing the British Lions, 12 June 1910

The History of the Argentina national team starts with the first international played by an Argentine side against the British Isles in 1910 when they toured on South America. Argentina gained recognition in 1965, when the team toured South Africa playing a series of friendly matches there. In that tour the national team was nicknamed Los Pumas, a name that became an identity mark for Argentina, remaining to present days.

Argentina has taken part in all the Rugby World Cups since the first edition in 1987, their best performance being the third place achieved in 2007. Argentina followed their growing competitiveness in the Rugby Championship with a strong showing in the 2015 World Cup, reaching the semi-finals for the second time. The national side has also played in the Rugby Championship since the 2012 edition, after joining the competition one year before.

== Colours, symbol and name ==
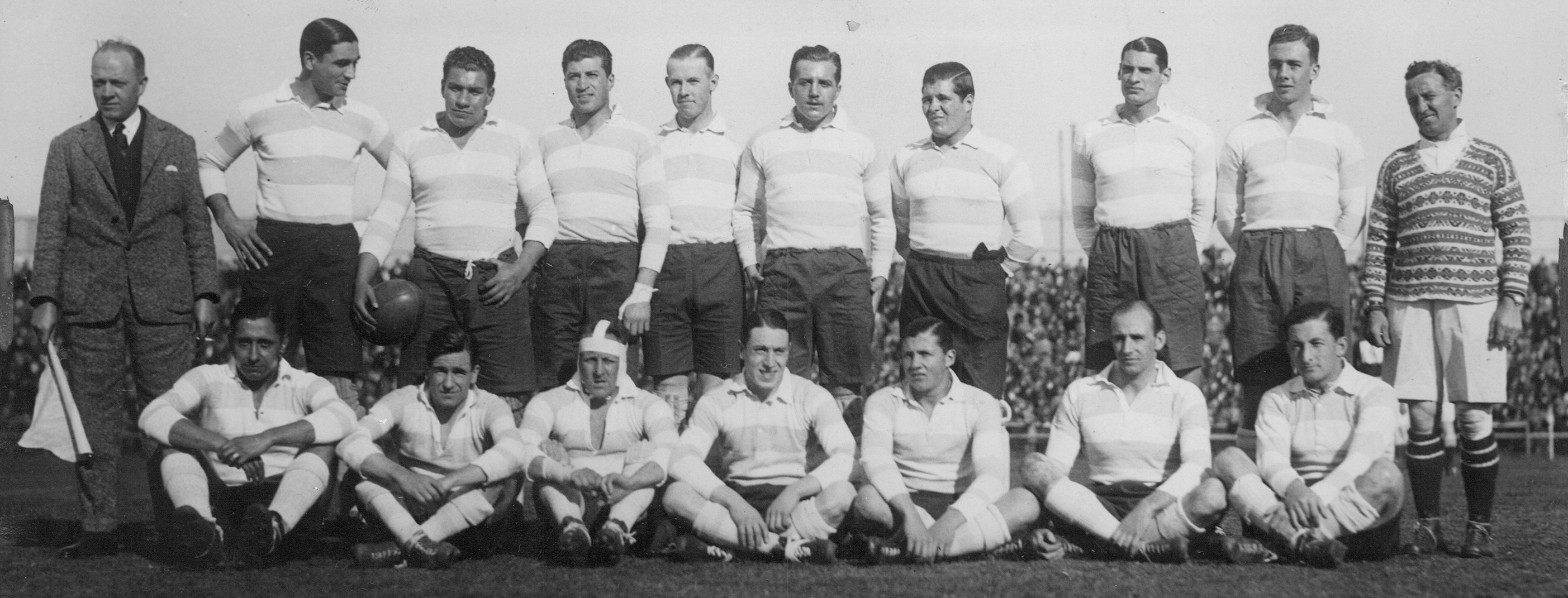
The team that played the first test against the British Lions wearing the light blue and white jersey for the first time on 31 July 1927

Argentina alternated blue and white jerseys during its first international matches in 1910. In 1927 Mr. Abelardo Gutiérrez of Gimnasia y Esgrima de Buenos Aires proposed that Argentina should play against the British Lions wearing a striped light blue and white jersey. That request was accepted and Argentina wore the striped uniform for the first time in its history.

Los Pumas play in a shirt in the country's flag (and sporting) colours of light blue and white, white shorts, and socks in light blue and white. In 2011, the UAR signed a deal with Nike which became the exclusive kit provider for all its national senior and youth teams, including Pampas XV. The first uniform designed by the American company left the traditional horizontal-striped jersey behind, featuring a single light blue with white shoulders jersey, although it was announced that Los Pumas would wear its traditional uniform again when they play the 2012 Rugby Championship.

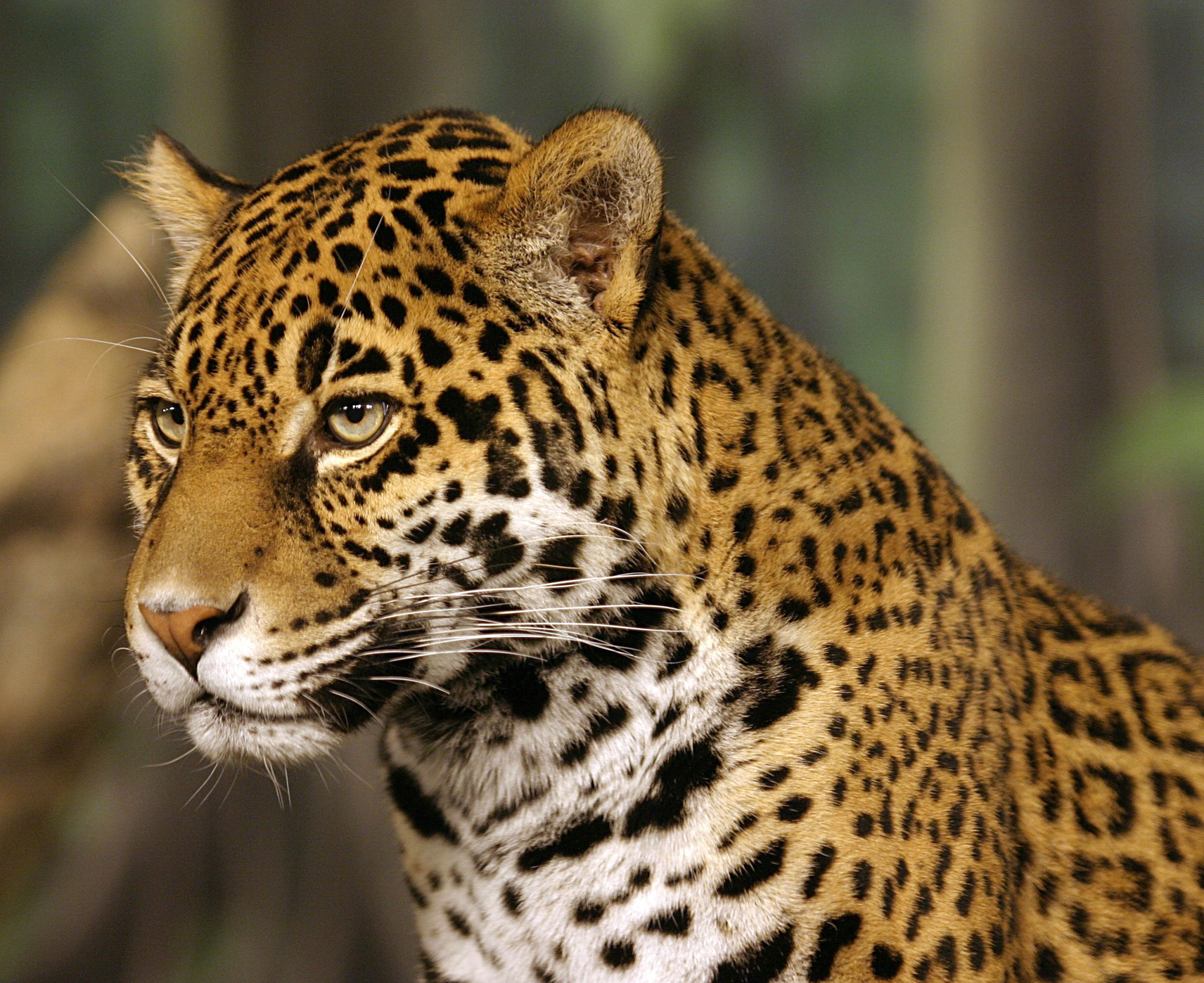
The Jaguar, native to northeastern Argentina was chosen as the symbol of the team in 1941

In September 1941, Abelardo Gutiérrez (who had proposed the use of a white and blue jersey for the team 14 years prior) suggested a badge with the figure of a lion. The color of the crest was blue (due to Buenos Aires Cricket Club, where the first rugby match in Argentina had been played). The animal was later replaced by a native to Argentine species, so the jaguar was chosen due to his "agility and courage", according to their words.

The Pumas nickname is the result of an error made by Carl Kohler, a journalist for the then Die Transvaler newspaper in South Africa, while following the team during their first overseas tour ever – to Southern Africa (to Rhodesia, now Zimbabwe, and South Africa) in 1965. He tried to devise a catchy nickname for the team similar to existing international team nicknames such as All Blacks, Springboks, and Wallabies. He asked Isak van Heerden, the then coach of the Natal Rugby team who was asked by the SARB to assist with the tour, for ideas. They saw a picture of a type of lion with spots on the UAR crest. Kohler was aware that the Americas had jaguars and pumas, and as he was under pressure to submit his article, made a guess and called them the Pumas, instead of the actual jaguar. The mistake stuck, and was eventually adopted by the Argentines themselves (although the UAR crest continued to depict a jaguar until 2023).

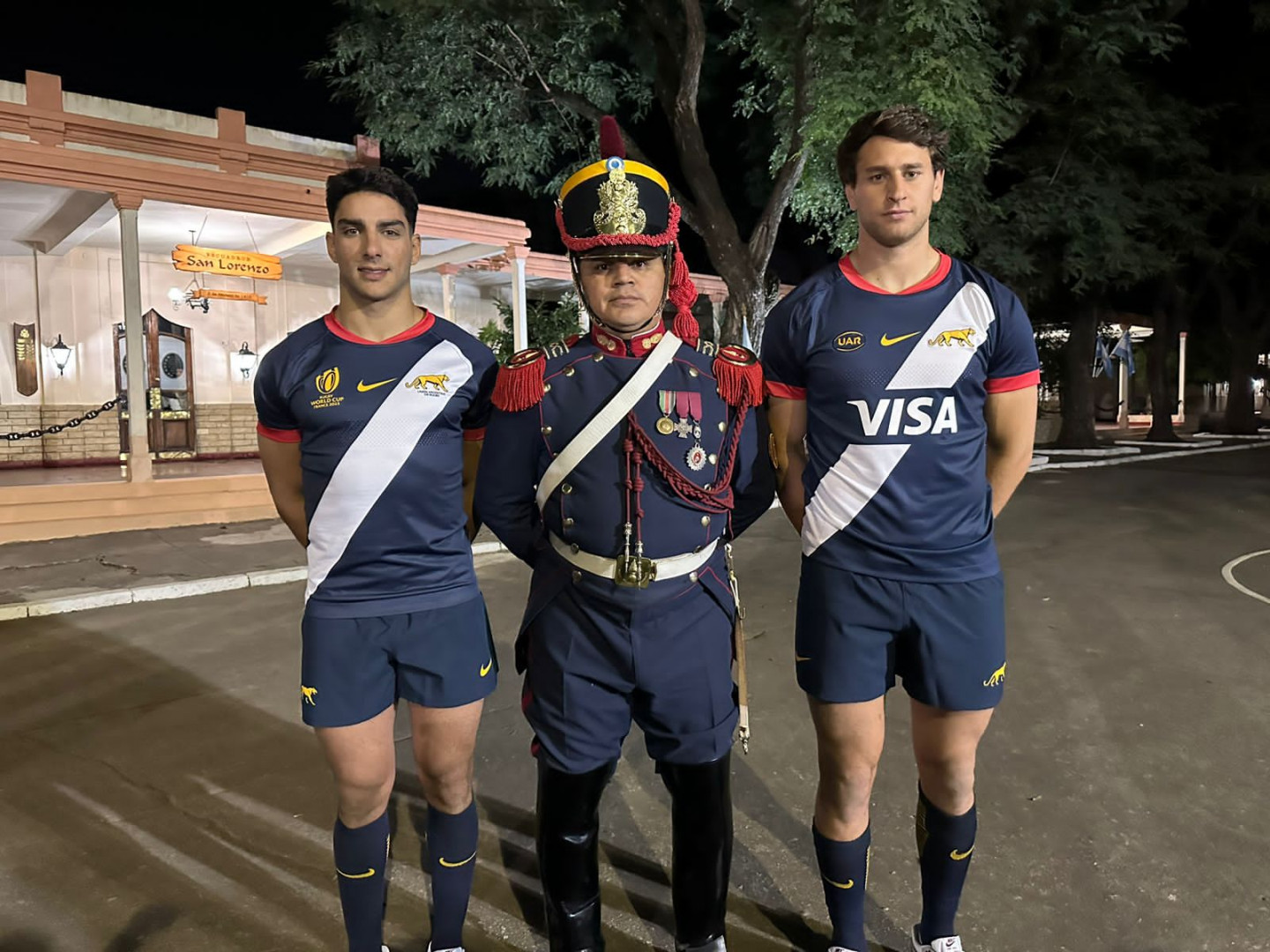
Players of Los Pumas and a grenadier posing with the away uniform for the 2023 World Cup

In April 2023, the UAR launched its new visual identity that included a change of emblems not only of the body but of the national teams, from senior to 7s and youth representatives. The process included the substitution of the characteristic jaguar figure with the puma, used as a namesake for the team since the 1965 tour in Rhodesia and South Africa. That same year the UAR released the Pumas' away kit inspired by the uniform of the Mounted Grenadiers Regiment, the Argentine military unit and presidential honor guard established in 1812. The away kit was worn at the 2023 Rugby World Cup.

In July 2026, Argentina played their 2026 Nations Championship match vs England wearing a kit that was an exact replica of the model worn by the Argentina football team during the historic "goal of the century" match in 1986, including details like the silver numbers on back. The kit –manufactured by Pumas kit supplier Le Coq Sportif, the same than Argentina in 1986– was a limited edition to commemorate the 40th. anniversary of the historic football match.

=== Kit suppliers ===
Period	Kit manufacturer	Shirt sponsor	Ref.
1963-1968	Noceto Sports	(no shirt sponsor)	
1968-1977	Uribarri	(no shirt sponsor)	
1978–1998	Adidas	(no shirt sponsor)	
1999–2000	Adidas	VISA	
2000–2003	Topper	VISA	
2004–2011	Adidas	VISA	
2012–2023	Nike	VISA	
2024–	Le Coq Sportif	VISA	

== Home grounds ==
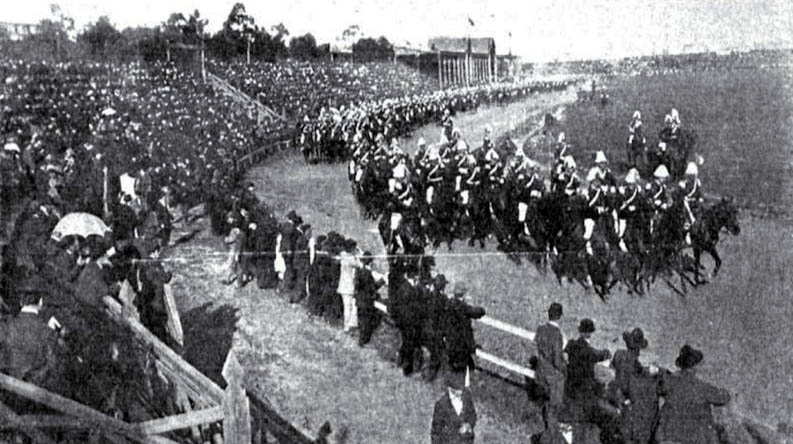
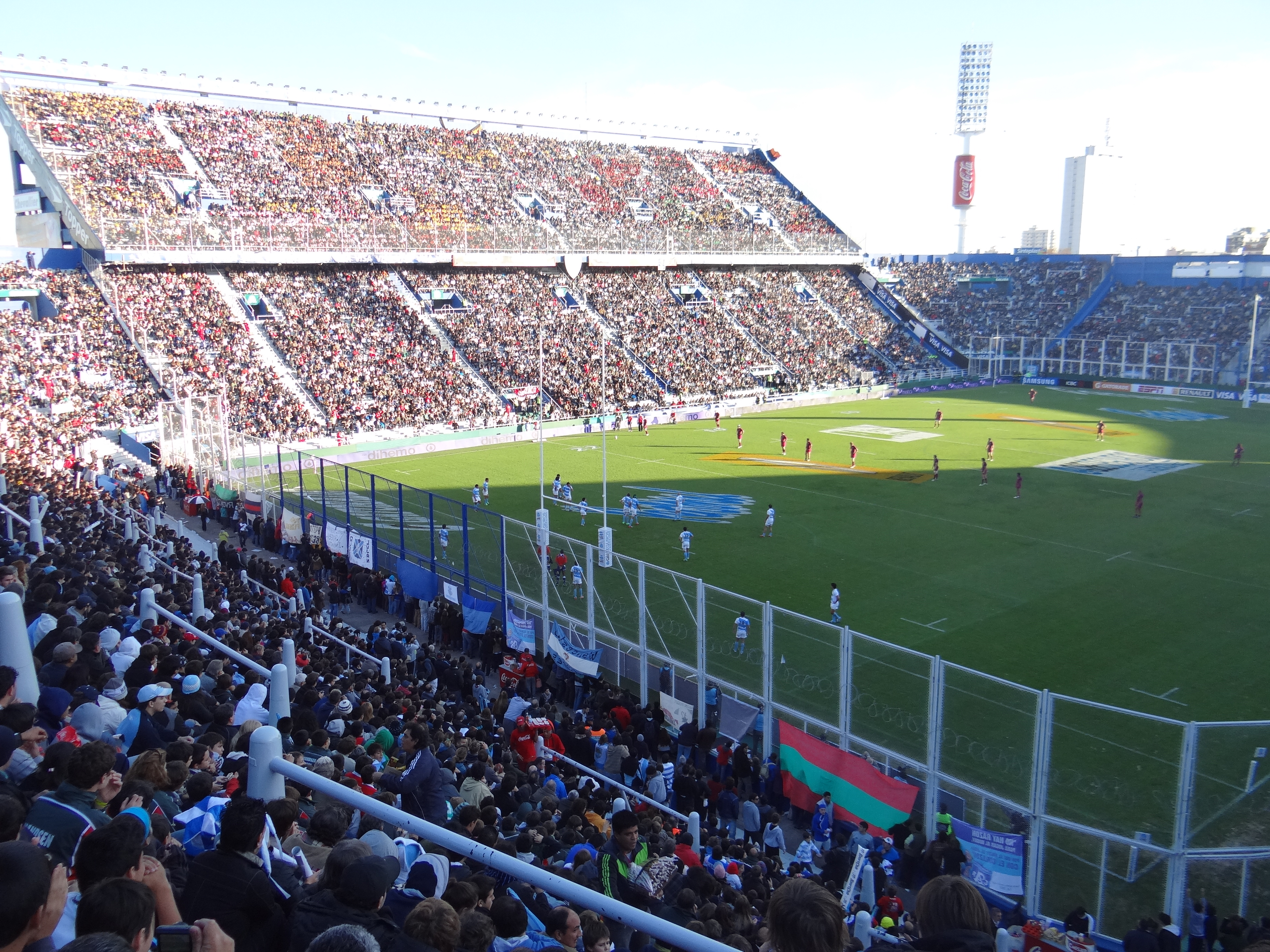
Sociedad Sportiva Argentina (above) was the first venue for Argentina in 1910. José Amalfitani Stadium (bottom), one of the current venues when the team plays in Buenos Aires

The Pumas use a variety of stadiums when playing at home. One of the most frequently used for tests is José Amalfitani Stadium, home of Club Atlético Vélez Sarsfield and sited in Buenos Aires. When Great Britain made their first tour to Argentina in 1910, the national team played them at Sociedad Sportiva Argentina of Palermo. That test was also notable for being the first Argentina match ever.

When the British combined returned to Argentina in 1927, the national side started to use GEBA and Buenos Aires Cricket Club as their home venues. GEBA was a frequent venue during the next decades, but hosted only three matches after the 1960s, as the Pumas started using larger stadiums; the Pumas' last match at GEBA was in 1993. On the other side, the Buenos Aires Cricket was also used for a large number of matches until 1948 when it was destroyed by fire.

In 1997 BACRC inaugurated the first purpose-built rugby union stadium in Argentina, erected in Los Polvorines, Greater Buenos Aires. A total of nine international games were played there by the national team until 2005 when it was sold.

Los Pumas played in Ferro Carril Oeste stadium between 1970 and 1986, when Argentina moved to Vélez Sarsfield Stadium. Some of the teams that visited those venues were Ireland, New Zealand, France, and Australia among others.

During the mid year tests in 2007, as well as Vélez Sársfield, Argentina played games at venues including Brigadier Estanislao López in Santa Fe, Malvinas Argentinas in Mendoza, and Gigante de Arroyito, in Rosario. Argentina have also used the River Plate Stadium in the past, and in 2006 hosted Wales at Estadio Raúl Conti in Puerto Madryn.

Other venues that have hosted Argentina rugby team were José M. Minella in Mar del Plata (2008), Monumental José Fierro in Tucumán (2012, 2014), Mario Kempes in Córdoba (2012), Centenario in Resistencia (2014), Padre Martearena in Salta (venue for the Rugby Championship, 2016–2019 editions), Estadio del Bicentenario in San Juan –where the team played tests v England and Wales (2017–18), and Estanislao López in Santa Fe (2017).

== Records ==
=== Overall ===
When the world rankings were introduced by the IRB in October 2003, Argentina were ranked seventh. They fell to eighth in the rankings in June 2004, before rising back to seventh by November that year. They fell back to eighth in February 2005, and stayed there until falling to their lowest ranking of ninth in February 2006. Since then, Argentina rose to eighth in July 2006, then sixth in November of that year. They had a one-week fall to seventh, then one week later rose to fifth to start the World Cup 2007.

Los Pumas twice surpassed their highest ranking at the 2007 Rugby World Cup. Defeating number three France, the second opening game loss for a World Cup hosting nation, moved them into fourth place, their highest position since the IRB World Rankings were established. They lost to eventual champions South Africa in the semi-final but beat France yet again in the bronze medal round to set another highest ranking, third, behind South Africa and New Zealand.

Argentina has won every match against South American national teams, including 41 against Uruguay, 40 against Chile, 17 against Paraguay and 13 against Brazil.

On 14 November 2020, they registered their first win against New Zealand, meaning that they have recorded a victory over every Tier 1 nation.

Men's World Rugby Rankings Top 20 as of 16 November 2026
Rank	Change (Note: Change from the previous week)	Team	Points
1	Steady	South Africa	91.53
2	Steady	New Zealand	90.65
3	▲1	France	89.05
4	▼1	Ireland	88.70
5	Steady	England	86.99
6	Steady	Scotland	85.28
7	Steady	Australia	82.24
8	Steady	Argentina	82.09
9	▲1	Wales	79.37
10	▼1	Fiji	77.79
11	Steady	Italy	75.84
12	Steady	Japan	75.25
13	Steady	Georgia	74.23
14	▲1	United States	68.39
15	▼1	Portugal	68.24
16	▲3	Samoa	67.60
17	▲1	Chile	67.00
18	▼2	Spain	66.53
19	▼2	Tonga	65.58
20	Steady	Uruguay	65.17

**Argentina's historical rankings**

Source: World Rugby
Graph updated to 16 November 2026

Argentina have won 257 of their 515 Test matches. Below is table of the representative rugby matches played by an Argentina national XV at test level up until 15 March 2026.

Opponent	Played	Won	Lost	Drawn	Win %	For	Aga	Diff
Australia	43	10	30	3	23%	837	1,184	−347
Brazil	13	13	0	0	100%	1,054	47	+1,007
British & Irish Lions	8	1	6	1	13%	59	260	−205
Canada	8	6	2	0	75%	262	137	+125
Chile	40	40	0	0	100%	1,686	242	+1,444
England	30	5	24	1	17%	488	814	−326
England XV	1	0	0	1	0%	13	13	+0
Fiji	4	3	1	0	75%	130	96	+34
France	56	15	40	1	27%	907	1,385	−478
Georgia	5	5	0	0	100%	186	66	+120
Ireland	20	6	14	0	30%	388	482	−94
Ireland XV	5	2	2	1	40%	25	36	−11
Italy	24	18	5	1	75%	644	417	+227
Japan	7	6	1	0	86%	298	186	+112
Junior Springboks	5	1	4	0	20%	26	166	−140
Namibia	3	3	0	0	100%	194	36	+158
New Zealand	41	4	36	1	10%	607	1,570	−963
New Zealand XV	4	0	4	0	0%	30	80	−50
Oxford and Cambridge	8	2	5	1	25%	48	126	−78
Paraguay	17	17	0	0	100%	1,382	65	+1,317
Peru	1	1	0	0	100%	44	0	+44
Romania	9	9	0	0	100%	341	114	+227
Samoa	5	2	3	0	40%	101	121	−20
Scotland	23	12	11	0	52%	436	540	−104
Scotland XV	3	1	2	0	33%	34	21	+13
South Africa	40	4	35	1	10%	784	1,411	−627
South Africa Gazelles	6	2	4	0	33%	60	71	−11
Spain	5	5	0	0	100%	211	78	+133
Tonga	2	2	0	0	100%	73	28	+45
United States	9	9	0	0	100%	294	136	+158
Uruguay	41	41	0	0	100%	1,784	418	+1,366
Venezuela	1	1	0	0	100%	147	7	+140
Wales	23	8	14	1	35%	539	601	−62
Wales XV	3	1	1	1	33%	37	34	+3
World XV	2	2	0	0	100%	64	42	+22
Total	515	257	244	14	49.9%	14,213	11,030	+3,183

=== Rugby World Cup ===
Rugby World Cup record									Qualification						
Year	Round	Pld	W	D	L	PF	PA	Squad	Pos	Pld	W	D	L	PF	PA
(New Zealand) (Australia) 1987	Pool stage	3	1	0	2	49	90	Squad	Invited						
(England) (France) (Ireland) (Scotland) (Wales) 1991	Pool stage	3	0	0	3	38	83	Squad	2nd	4	2	0	2	57	46
(South Africa) 1995	Pool stage	3	0	0	3	69	87	Squad	P/O	5	5	0	0	184	53
(Wales) 1999	Quarter-finals	5	3	0	2	137	122	Squad	1st	3	3	0	0	161	52
(Australia) 2003	Pool stage	4	2	0	2	140	57	Squad	Automatically qualified						
(France) 2007	Third place	7	6	0	1	209	93	Squad	1st	2	2	0	0	86	13
(New Zealand) 2011	Quarter-finals	5	3	0	2	100	73	Squad	Automatically qualified						
(England) 2015	Fourth place	7	4	0	3	250	143	Squad	Automatically qualified						
(Japan) 2019	Pool stage	4	2	0	2	106	91	Squad	Automatically qualified						
(France) 2023	Fourth place	7	4	0	3	185	156	Squad	Automatically qualified						
(Australia) 2027	Qualified								Automatically qualified						
(United States) 2031	To be determined								To be determined						
Total	—	48	25	0	23	1283	995	—	—	14	12	0	2	488	164
**Champions**; Runners–up; Third place; Fourth place; Home venue

=== The Rugby Championship ===
All-time Tri Nations and the Rugby Championship record (2012–present)
Year	Position	Pld	W	D	L	PTS	PF	PA	PD
2012	4th	6	0	1	5	4	80	166	-86
2013	4th	6	0	0	6	2	88	224	-136
2014	4th	6	1	0	5	7	105	157	-52
2015	**3rd**	**3**	**1**	**0**	**2**	**5**	**64**	**98**	**-23**
2016	4th	6	1	0	5	5	129	216	-87
2017	4th	6	0	0	6	0	110	235	-125
2018	4th	6	2	0	4	8	151	198	-47
2019	4th	3	0	0	3	2	39	82	-43
2020	**2nd**	**4**	**1**	**2**	**1**	**8**	**56**	**84**	**-28**
2021	4th	6	0	0	6	0	60	195	-135
2022	4th	6	2	0	4	9	143	203	-60
2023	**3rd**	**3**	**1**	**0**	**2**	**5**	**50**	**115**	**-65**
2024	**3rd**	**6**	**3**	**0**	**3**	**14**	**170**	**195**	**-25**
2025	4th	6	2	0	4	10	162	214	-52
Total	—N/a	73	14	3	56	79	1414	2361	-947

Updated: 5 October 2025

Tri Nations Series (1996–2011; 2020)
Nation	Matches				Points			Bonus points	Table points	Titles won
Nation	P	W	D	L	PF	PA	PD	Bonus points	Table points	Titles won
New Zealand	76	52	0	24	2,054	1,449	+605	35	**243**	**11**
Australia	76	30	3	43	1,591	1,817	−226	34	**160**	**3**
South Africa	72	28	1	43	1,480	1,831	−351	24	**138**	**3**
Argentina	4	1	2	1	56	84	–28	0	**8**	**0**

Source: lassen.co.nz – Tri-Nations, Australia, New Zealand, South Africa

Bonus points given by T – 4W − 2D, for T table points, W games won and D games drawn.

Rugby Championship (since 2012)
Nation	Matches				Points			Bonus points	Table points	Titles won
Nation	P	W	D	L	PF	PA	PD	Bonus points	Table points	Titles won
New Zealand	69	55	2	12	2,313	1,348	+965	43	**268**	**9**
South Africa	69	37	4	28	1,845	1,534	+311	33	**185**	**3**
Australia	69	28	3	38	1,563	1,900	−337	16	**141**	**1**
Argentina	69	14	1	54	1,358	2,277	−919	16	**66**	**0**

Updated: 4 October 2025
Source: lassen.co.nz – TRC, Argentina, Australia, New Zealand, South Africa
Bonus points given by T – 4W − 2D, for T table points, W games won and D games drawn.

All-time Tri Nations Series and Rugby Championship Table (since 1996)
Nation	Matches				Points			Bonus points	Table points	Titles won
Nation	P	W	D	L	PF	PA	PD	Bonus points	Table points	Titles won
New Zealand	145	107	2	36	4,367	2,797	+1,570	78	**511**	**20**
South Africa	141	65	5	71	3,325	3,365	–40	57	**323**	**6**
Australia	145	58	6	81	3,154	3,717	–563	50	**301**	**4**
Argentina	73	15	3	55	1,414	2,361	–947	16	**74**	**0**

Updated: 4 October 2025
Bonus points given by T – 4W − 2D, for T table points, W games won and D games drawn.

=== Series played ===
Argentina's home and away series' played total
Team	Series stats					Home series	Away series
Team	P	W	D	L	%	Home series	Away series
Australia	7	1	3	3	14.29	1979, **1987**, 1997	1983, 1986, 1995, 2000
England	5	0	2	3	0.00	1981, 1990, 1997, 2013, 2017	
Fiji	1	1	0	0	100.00	**1980**	
France	18	1	6	11	5.56	1949, 1954, 1960, 1974, 1977, 1985, 1986, 1988, 1992, 1996, 1998, **2003**, 2012, 2016, 2024	1975, 1982, 1988,
Ireland	2	1	0	1	50.00	**2007**, 2014	
Italy	1	0	1	0	0.00	2005	
Japan	1	1	0	0	100.00	**1993**	
New Zealand	4	0	0	4	0.00	1985, 1991	1989, 1997
Romania	1	1	0	0	100.00	**1973**	
Scotland	4	2	1	1	50.00	**1994**, 2008, 2010, **2022**	
South Africa	3	0	0	3	0.00	1993, 1996	1994
Spain	1	1	0	0	100.00	**1992**	
Wales	5	2	1	2	40.00	1999, 2004, **2006**, 2018	**2021**
Total	53	11	14	28	20.75	**Bold text** denotes series was won by Argentina; Italic text denotes series was drawn	

== Players ==
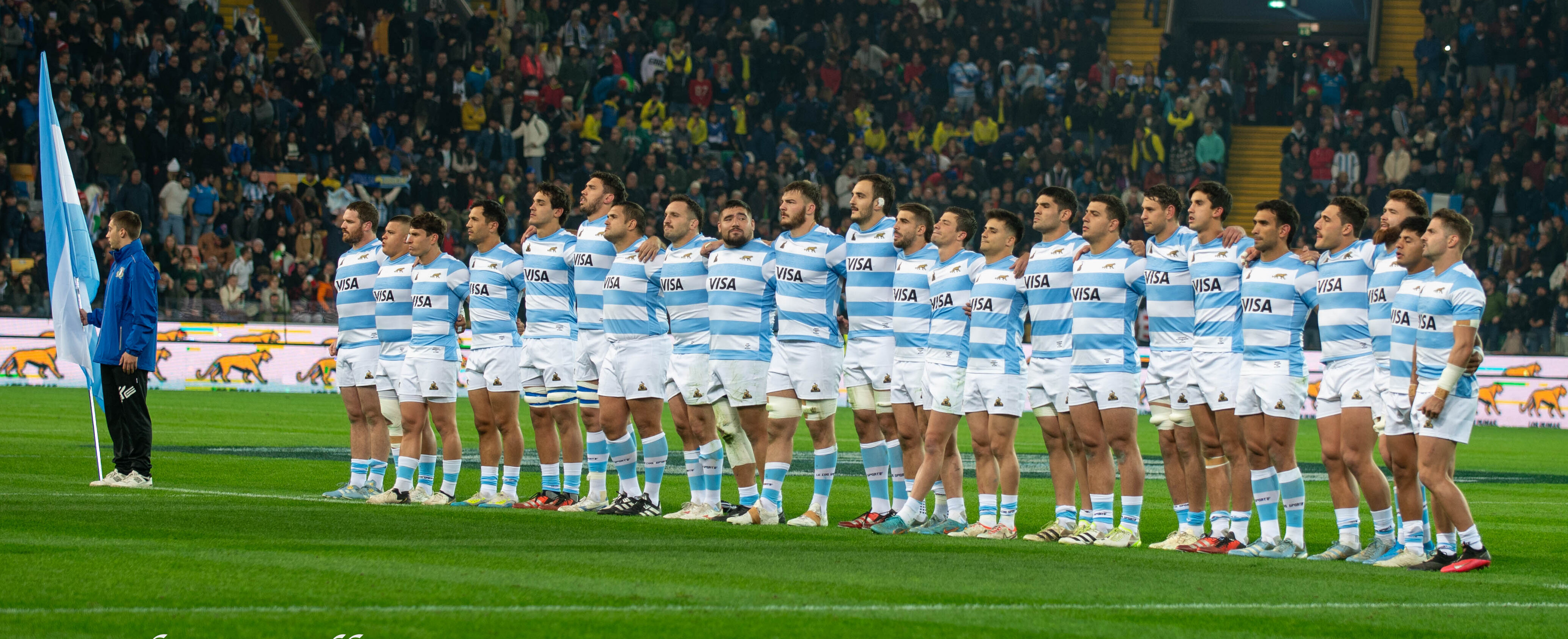
The Argentine team ahead of their 2024 clash with Italy

=== Current squad ===
On 30 October 2026, Argentina named a 33-player squad ahead of the 2026 Nations Championship Northern Hemisphere Series.

- Caps updated: 14 November 2026 (after Italy v Argentina)

Head coach: Felipe Contepomi

Player	Position	Date of birth (age)	Caps	Club/province
Julián Montoya	Hooker	29 October 1993 (age 33)	121	(France) Pau
Leonel Oviedo	Hooker	16 February 1998 (age 28)	4	(Australia) Western Force
Rodrigo Martínez	Prop	7 July 1998 (age 28)	4	(Wales) Dragons
Francisco Moreno	Prop	31 January 2002 (age 24)	5	(England) Newcastle Red Bulls
Tomas Rapetti	Prop	4 March 2005 (age 21)	8	(France) Toulouse
Joel Sclavi	Prop	25 June 1994 (age 32)	34	(England) Leicester Tigers
Mayco Vivas	Prop	2 June 1998 (age 28)	46	(France) Oyonnax
Boris Wenger	Prop	1 July 2002 (age 24)	13	(England) Harlequins
Efraín Elías	Lock	30 April 2004 (age 22)	8	(France) Toulouse
Tomás Lavanini	Lock	22 January 1993 (age 33)	94	(New Zealand) Highlanders
Guido Petti	Lock	17 November 1994 (age 32)	106	(England) Harlequins
Pedro Rubiolo	Lock	21 December 2002 (age 23)	33	(England) Bristol Bears
Juan Martín González	Back row	14 November 2000 (age 26)	53	(England) Saracens
Facundo Isa	Back row	21 September 1993 (age 33)	54	(France) Pau
Marcos Kremer	Back row	30 July 1997 (age 29)	84	(France) Clermont
Pablo Matera	Back row	18 July 1993 (age 33)	129	(Japan) Tochigi Honda Heat
Joaquín Moro	Back row	24 January 2001 (age 25)	9	(England) Leicester Tigers
Juan Martín Scelzo	Back row	12 February 2002 (age 24)	4	(France) Stade Français Paris
Simón Benítez Cruz	Scrum-half	6 September 1999 (age 27)	17	(England) Newcastle Red Bulls
Gonzalo García	Scrum-half	5 March 1999 (age 27)	21	(England) Pau
Agustín Moyano	Scrum-half	12 June 2001 (age 25)	11	(Australia) Western Force
Tomás Albornoz	Fly-half	17 September 1997 (age 29)	26	(France) Toulon
Gerónimo Prisciantelli	Fly-half	23 August 1999 (age 27)	8	(France) Racing 92
Santiago Chocobares	Centre	31 March 1999 (age 27)	37	(France) Toulouse
Lucio Cinti	Centre	23 February 2000 (age 26)	46	(England) Saracens
Justo Piccardo	Centre	25 March 2002 (age 24)	15	(France) Montpellier
Faustino Sánchez Valarolo	Centre	8 July 2004 (age 22)	5	(Argentina) Dogos XV
Mateo Carreras	Wing	17 December 1999 (age 26)	38	(France) Bayonne
Bautista Delguy	Wing	22 April 1997 (age 29)	44	(France) Clermont
Rodrigo Isgró	Wing	23 March 1999 (age 27)	21	(England) Harlequins
Ignacio Mendy	Wing	29 June 2000 (age 26)	9	(Italy) Benetton
Juan Cruz Mallía	Fullback	11 September 1996 (age 30)	53	(France) Toulouse
Mateo Soler	Fullback	20 May 2003 (age 23)	1	(Argentina) Dogos XV

=== Hall of fame ===
Four former Argentina international players have been inducted into the World Rugby Hall of Fame.

- Hugo Porta

(Inducted in 2008)

- Agustín Pichot

(Inducted in 2011)

- Felipe Contepomi

(Inducted in 2017)

- Juan Martín Hernández

(Inducted in 2023)

One player was also inducted into the previous incarnation, the International Rugby Hall of Fame.

- Hugo Porta

(Inducted in 1997)

=== Award winners ===
The following Argentina players have been recognised at the World Rugby Awards since 2001:

World Rugby Player of the Year
Year	Nominees	Winners
2007	Felipe Contepomi	—
2007	Juan Martín Hernández	—

World Rugby Breakthrough Player of the Year
Year	Nominees	Winners
2017	Emiliano Boffelli	—

World Rugby Dream Team of the Year
Year	No.	Players
2022	6.	Pablo Matera
2024	6.	Pablo Matera

World Rugby Try of the Year
Year	Date	Scorer	Match	Tournament
2017	10 June	Joaquín Tuculet	vs. England	England tour of Argentina

== Coaches ==
The following people have served in the head coach role for Argentina:

- Edmundo Stanfield (1932)
- Luis Cilley (1936)
- Carlos Huntley-Robertson (1936)
- Edmundo Stanfield (1936)
- Juan C. Wells (1954)
- Dermot Cavanagh (1956)
- Horacio Savino (1956)
- Jorge Merelle (1959)
- Robert Galarga (1960)
- Saturnino Racimo (1960)
- Izak van Heerden (1965)
- Ángel Guastella (1965–1973)
- Carlos Villegas (1974)
- Eduardo Poggi (1975)
- Carlos Villegas (1976–1977)
- Ángel Guastella (1978)
- Aitor Otaño (1978–1980)
- Rodolfo O'Reilly (1980–1983)
- Héctor Silva (1983–1987)^{1987 RWC}
- Rodolfo O'Reilly (1987–1990)
- Luis Gradín (1990–1993)^{1991 RWC}
- Héctor Méndez (1993–1994)
- Alejandro Petra (1994–1995)^{1995 RWC}
- Alex Wyllie (1995)
- Héctor Méndez (1995)
- Alex Wyllie (1995–1999)^{1999 RWC}
- Marcelo Loffreda (2000–2007)^{2003 RWC; 2007 RWC}
- Santiago Phelan (2008–2013) ^{2011 RWC}
- Daniel Hourcade (2013–2018)^{2015 RWC}
- Mario Ledesma (2018–2022)^{2019 RWC}
- Michael Cheika (2022–2023)^{2023 RWC}
- Felipe Contepomi (2023–present)

== Player records (career) ==
=== Most matches ===
Pablo Matera, Argentina most-capped player

#	Player	Pos	Years	Mat	Start	Sub	Won	Lost	Draw	%
1	Pablo Matera	Flanker	2013-	130	117	13	43	83	3	33.1%
2	Julián Montoya	Hooker	2014-	122	72	50	41	75	3	33.6%
3	Agustín Creevy	Hooker	2005-2024	110	65	45	37	73	0	33.6%
4	Guido Petti	Lock	2014-	107	85	22	37	66	3	34.6%
5	Nicolás Sánchez	Fly-half	2010-2023	104	85	19	34	67	3	32.7%
6	Matias Alemanno	Lock	2014-	102	59	43	34	65	3	33.3%
7	Matias Moroni	Centre	2014-	99	69	20	33	65	1	33.3%
8	Tomas Lavanini	Lock	2013-	95	80	15	29	64	2	30.5%
9	Tomas Cubelli	Scrum-half	2010-2023	93	45	49	36	56	1	38.7%
10	Felipe Contepomi	Centre	1998-2013	87	75	12	42	45	0	48.3%
10	Juan Manuel Leguizamón	Flanker	2005-2019	87	64	23	34	53	0	39.1%

Last updated: France vs Argentina, 21 November 2026. Statistics include officially capped matches only.

=== Most tries ===
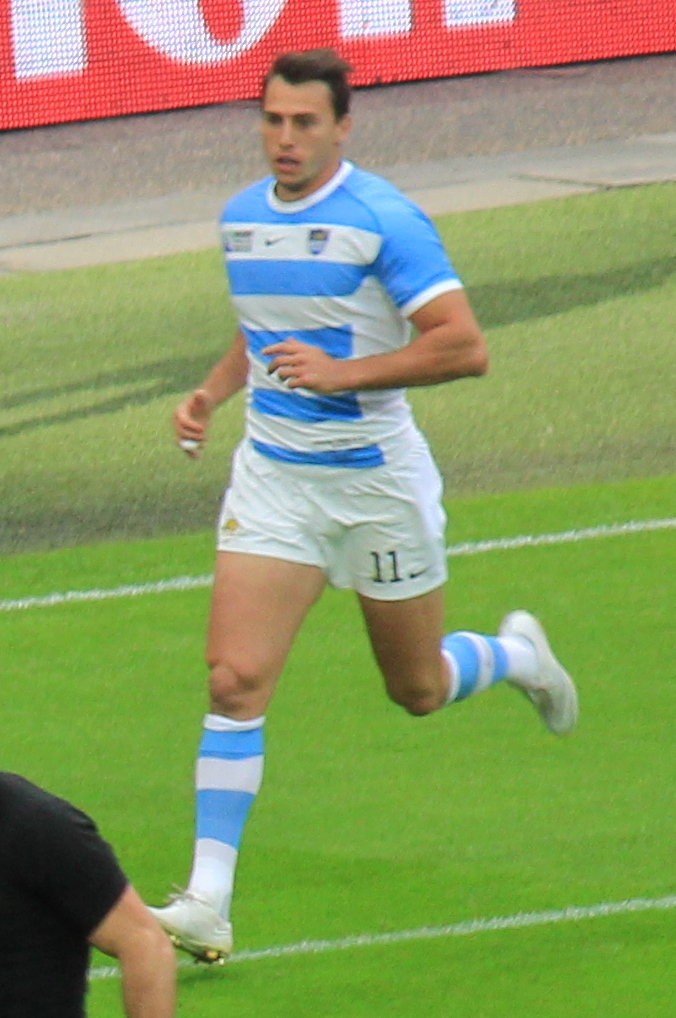
Juan Imhoff is the player who scored more tries in the history of Rugby World Cup for Argentina (7)

#	Player	Pos	Span	Mat	Start	Sub	Pts	Tries
1	José Núñez Piossek	Wing	2001-2008	28	26	2	145	29
2	Diego Cuesta Silva	Centre	1983-1995	63	63	0	125	28
3	Gustavo Jorge	Wing	1989-1994	23	22	1	111	24
4	Mateo Carreras	Wing	2021-	38	35	3	95	19
5	Rolando Martín	Flanker	1994-2003	86	77	9	90	18
5	Facundo Soler	Wing	1996-2002	25	23	2	90	18
5	Joaquin Tuculet	Fullback	2012-2019	56	51	5	90	18
8	Santiago Cordero	Wing	2013-2025	55	47	8	85	17
8	Juan Imhoff	Wing	2009-2023	43	32	11	85	17
8	Hernán Senillosa	Wing	2002-2007	33	22	11	128	17

Last updated: Italy vs Argentina, 14 November 2026. Statistics include officially capped matches only.

=== Most points ===
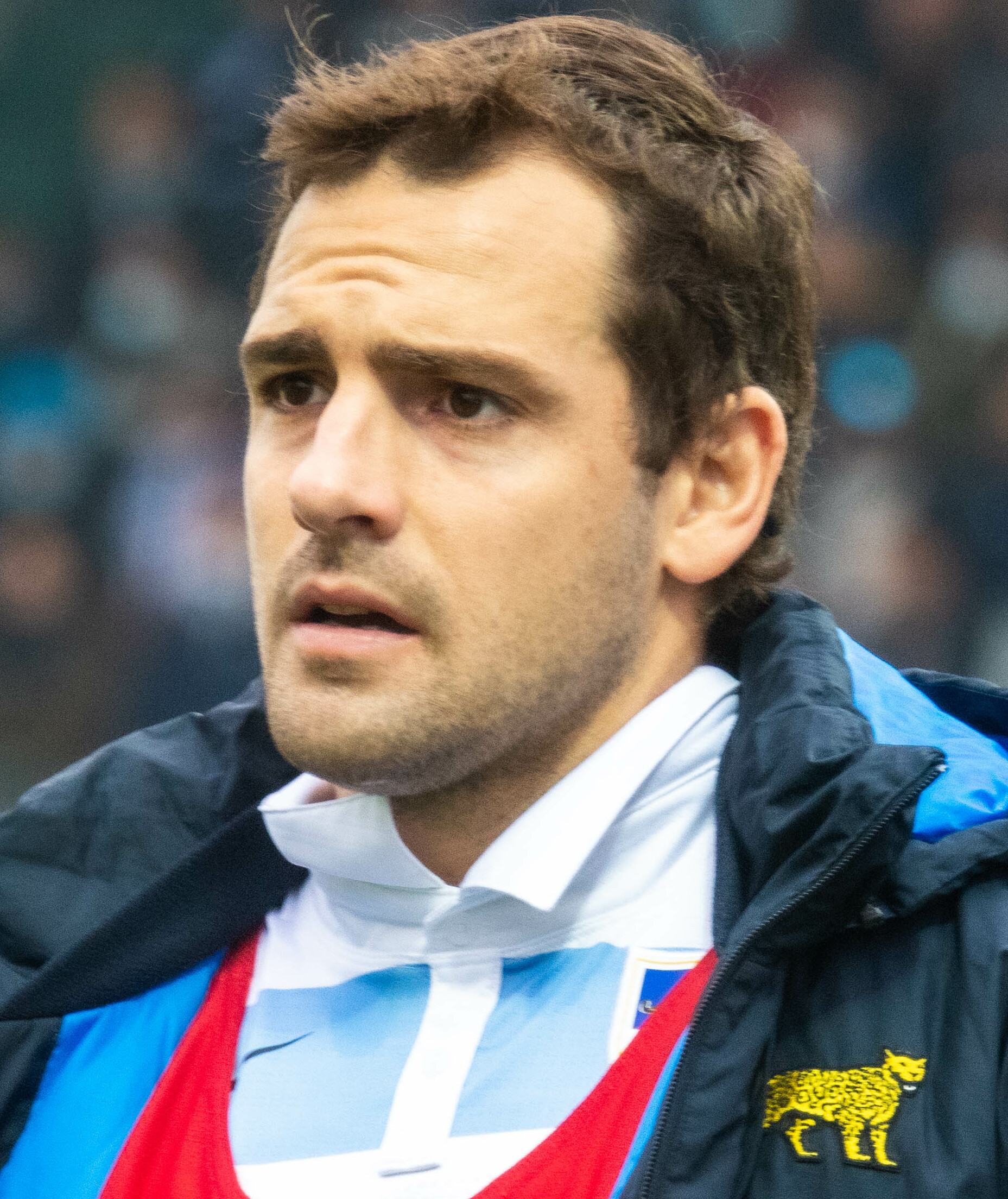
Nicolás Sánchez, all-time top scorer for Argentina (902)

#	Player	Pos	Span	Mat	Start	Sub	Pts	Tries	Conv	Pens	Drop
1	Nicolás Sánchez	Fly-half	2010-2023	104	85	19	902	15	130	177	12
2	Felipe Contepomi	Centre	1998–2013	87	75	12	651	16	74	139	2
3	Hugo Porta	Fly-half	1971–1990	58	58	0	590	11	84	101	26
4	Gonzalo Quesada	Fly-half	1996–2003	38	30	8	486	4	68	103	7
5	Santiago Mesón	Fullback	1987–1997	34	32	2	365	8	68	63	1
6	Emiliano Boffelli	Fullback	2017–2023	59	57	2	340	15	51	62	0
7	Federico Todeschini	Fly-half	1998–2008	21	16	5	256	4	37	54	0
8	Santiago Carreras	Fly-half	2019-	70	56	14	235	9	44	34	0
9	Tomás Albornoz	Fly-half	2021-	27	16	11	188	6	49	20	0
10	Lisandro Arbizu	Centre	1990–2005	86	83	3	183	16	14	14	11

Last updated: France vs Argentina, 21 November 2026. Statistics include officially capped matches only.

=== Most matches as captain ===
#	Player	Pos	Span	Mat	Won	Lost	Draw	%	Pts	Tries
1	Julián Montoya	Hooker	2021-	59	21	35	1	35.59	35	7
2	Agustín Creevy	Hooker	2014-2018	51	14	37	0	27.45	15	3
3	Lisandro Arbizu	Centre	1992–2003	48	28	20	0	58.33	87	10
4	Hugo Porta	Fly-half	1977–1990	38	15	18	5	46.05	435	2
5	Agustín Pichot	Scrum-half	2000–2007	30	18	12	0	60.00	5	1
6	Felipe Contepomi	Centre	2007–2013	25	10	15	0	40.00	232	5
7	Pablo Matera	Flanker	2018-2026	21	6	13	2	28.57	15	3
8	Juan Martín Fernández Lobbe	Number 8	2008–2014	20	4	15	1	22.50	10	2
8	Pedro Sporleder	Lock	1996–1999	20	9	10	1	47.50	20	4
10	Héctor Silva	Flanker	1967–1971	15	12	2	1	83.33	12	4

Last updated: France vs Argentina, 21 November 2026. Statistics include officially capped matches only.

== Player records (match) ==
=== Most points in a match ===
#	Player	Pos	Pts	Tries	Conv	Pens	Drop	Opposition	Venue	Date
1.	Eduardo Morgan	Wing	50	6	13	0	0	Paraguay	(Brazil) São Paulo	14/10/1973
2.	José Núñez Piossek	Wing	45	9	0	0	0	Paraguay	(Uruguay) Montevideo	27/04/2003
3.	Gustavo Jorge	Wing	40	8	0	0	0	Brazil	(Brazil) São Paulo	02/10/1993
4.	Martín Sansot	Fullback	36	3	6	4	0	Brazil	(Argentina) Tucumán	13/07/1996
5.	José Cilley	Fly-half	32	0	16	0	0	Paraguay	(Argentina) Mendoza	01/05/2002
6.	Eduardo Morgan	Wing	31	3	5	3	0	Uruguay	(Brazil) São Paulo	16/10/1973
6.	Eduardo de Forteza	Fly-half	31	0	11	3	0	Paraguay	(Paraguay) Asunción	25/09/1975
6.	José Luna	Wing	31	1	4	6	0	Romania	(Argentina) Buenos Aires	14/10/1995
6.	Felipe Contepomi	Fly-half	31	2	3	5	0	France	(Argentina) Buenos Aires	26/06/2010
10.	4 players on 30 points									

Last updated: Ireland vs Argentina, 15 November 2024. Statistics include officially capped matches only.

=== Most tries in a match ===
#	Player	Pos	Pts	Tries	Conv	Pens	Drop	Opposition	Venue	Date
1.	José Núñez Piossek	Wing	45	9	0	0	0	Paraguay	(Uruguay) Montevideo	27/04/2003
2.	Gustavo Jorge	Wing	40	8	0	0	0	Brazil	(Brazil) São Paulo	02/10/1993
3.	Uriel O'Farrell	Wing	21	7	0	0	0	Uruguay	(Argentina) Buenos Aires	09/09/1951
4.	Uriel O'Farrell	Wing	18	6	0	0	0	Brazil	(Argentina) Buenos Aires	13/09/1951
4.	Eduardo Morgan	Wing	50	6	13	0	0	Paraguay	(Brazil) São Paulo	14/10/1973
4.	Gustavo Jorge	Wing	24	6	0	0	0	Brazil	(Uruguay) Montevideo	08/10/1989
4.	Facundo Barrea	Wing	30	6	0	0	0	Brazil	(Chile) Santiago	23/05/2012
5	5 players on 5 tries									

Last updated: Ireland vs Argentina, 15 November 2024. Statistics include officially capped matches only.

== See also ==
- Argentina XV national rugby union team
- Argentina national rugby sevens team
- Argentina national under-20 rugby union team
