= Robert Duvall filmography =

Performances by American actor

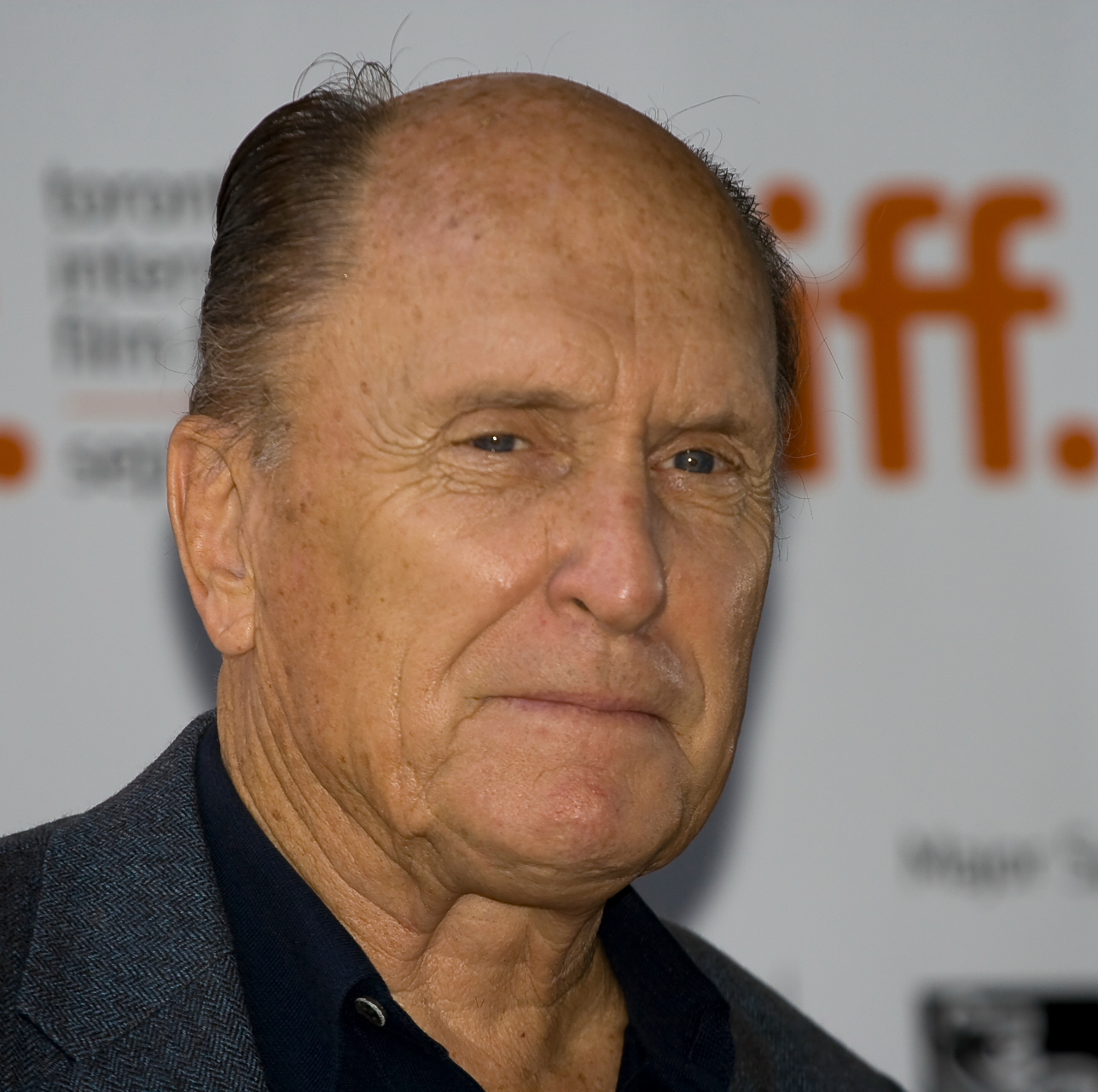
At the premiere of The Road in September 2009

American actor, director, and producer Robert Duvall had an extensive career in film and television, first appearing on an episode of Armstrong Circle Theatre in 1959. His television work during the 1960s includes Route 66 (1961), Alfred Hitchcock Presents (1962), The Twilight Zone (1963), The Outer Limits (1964), The F.B.I. (1965–1969), and The Mod Squad (1969). He was then cast as General Dwight D. Eisenhower in the 1979 miniseries Ike. In 1989, he played Augustus "Gus" McCrae alongside Tommy Lee Jones in the epic Western adventure television miniseries Lonesome Dove. The role earned him a Golden Globe Award for Best Actor – Miniseries or Television Film. Three years later, he portrayed Georgian revolutionary and Soviet political leader Joseph Stalin in the television film Stalin (1992), which earned him another Golden Globe Award for Best Actor in a Television Film.

Duvall's first film role was as Boo Radley in the 1962 film To Kill a Mockingbird with Gregory Peck. His other roles in the 1960s included Bullitt with Steve McQueen (1968) and True Grit with John Wayne (1969). In the 1970s, he played Major Frank Burns in M*A*S*H (1970), the title role in THX 1138 (1971), Tom Hagen in The Godfather (1972) and The Godfather Part II (1974), Jesse James in The Great Northfield Minnesota Raid (1972), Dr. Watson in The Seven-Per-Cent Solution (1976), Bull Meechum in The Great Santini (1979) and as Lieutenant Colonel Bill Kilgore in Apocalypse Now (1979).

In 1983, Duvall was cast as Mac Sledge in the drama film Tender Mercies, which earned him an Academy Award and Golden Globe for Best Actor. He went on to co-star in the films The Natural with Robert Redford (1984), Days of Thunder with Tom Cruise (1990), as Joseph Pulitzer in Newsies with Christian Bale (1992), Falling Down with Michael Douglas (1993), Something to Talk About with Julia Roberts (1995), Sling Blade with Billy Bob Thornton (1996), A Family Thing with James Earl Jones (1996), Phenomenon with John Travolta (1996), and Deep Impact with Téa Leoni (1998). For his role in the 1998 film A Civil Action again with Travolta, he won a SAG Award for Outstanding Performance by a Male Actor in a Supporting Role.

In the 2000s, Duvall had notable roles in the films Gone in 60 Seconds opposite Nicolas Cage (2000), Secondhand Lions co-starring with Michael Caine (2003), Open Range co-starring with Kevin Costner (2003) and in the comedy film Four Christmases opposite Vince Vaughn (2008). He starred in and executive produced the 2006 Western television miniseries, Broken Trail. For that, he won two Emmy Awards, one for Outstanding Lead Actor In A Miniseries Or A Movie and the other for Outstanding Miniseries which he shared with the other producers. In 2012, he reunited with Tom Cruise after 22 years in the action thriller film Jack Reacher where he played the character Cash. In 2014, he co-starred with Robert Downey Jr. in the legal drama film The Judge where he played Judge Joseph Palmer, the father of Downey's character.

== Acting credits ==
=== Film ===
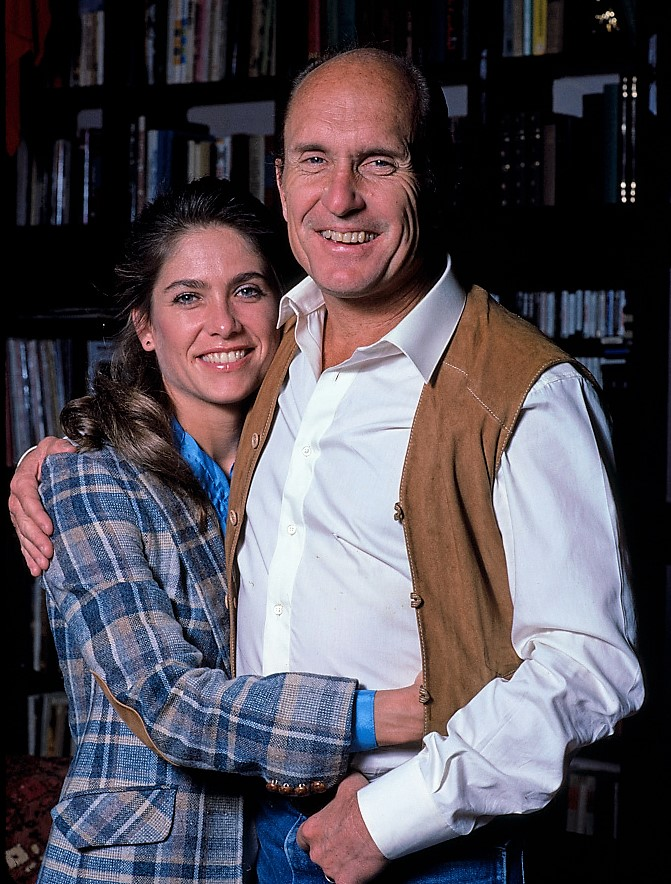
With then-wife Gail Youngs in March 1984

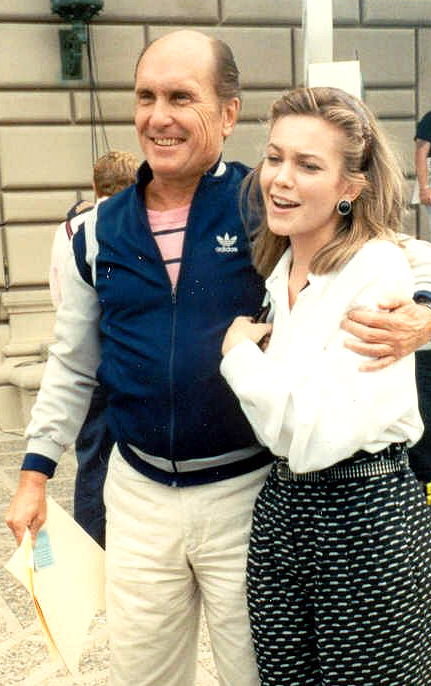
With Diane Lane in September 1989

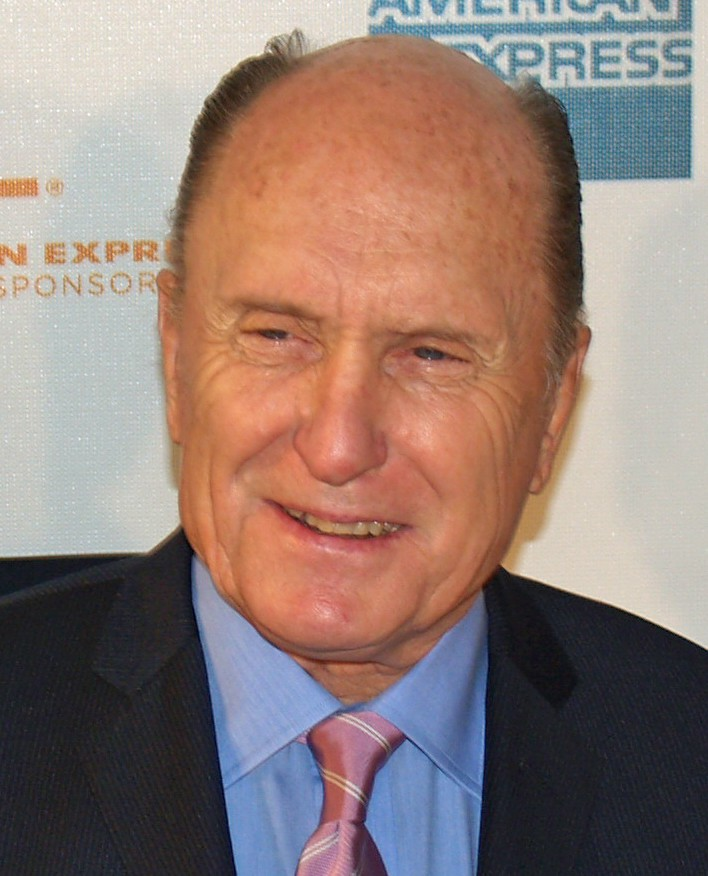
In May 2007

Film credits
| Year | Title | Role | Notes | Refs. |
|---|---|---|---|---|
| 1962 | To Kill a Mockingbird | Boo Radley | | |
| 1962 | Captain Newman, M.D. | Captain Paul Cabot Winston | | |
| 1965 | Nightmare in the Sun | Motorcyclist | | |
| 1966 | The Chase | Edwin Stewart | | |
| 1967 | Countdown | Charles "Chiz" Stewart | | |
| 1968 | The Detective | Nestor | | |
| 1968 | Bullitt | Weissberg | | |
| 1969 | True Grit | Ned Pepper | | |
| 1969 | The Rain People | Gordon | | |
| 1970 | M*A*S*H | Major Frank Burns | | |
| 1970 | The Revolutionary | Despard | | |
| 1971 | THX 1138 | THX | | |
| 1971 | Lawman | Vernon Adams | | |
| 1972 | The Godfather | Tom Hagen | | |
| 1972 | The Great Northfield, Minnesota Raid | Jesse James | | |
| 1972 | Tomorrow | Jackson Fentry | | |
| 1972 | Joe Kidd | Frank Harlan | | |
| 1973 | The Outfit | Earl Macklin | | |
| 1973 | Badge 373 | Eddie Ryan | | |
| 1973 | Lady Ice | Ford Pierce | | |
| 1974 | The Conversation | The Director | Uncredited | |
| 1974 | The Godfather Part II | Tom Hagen | | |
| 1975 | The Killer Elite | George Hansen | | |
| 1975 | Breakout | Jay Wagner | | |
| 1976 | The Eagle Has Landed | Colonel Radl | | |
| 1976 | The Seven-Per-Cent Solution | Dr. John H. Watson | | |
| 1976 | Network | Frank Hackett | | |
| 1977 | The Greatest | Bill McDonald | | |
| 1977 | We're Not the Jet Set | —N/a | Director only; documentary | |
| 1978 | Invasion of the Body Snatchers | Priest on Swing | Uncredited | |
| 1978 | The Betsy | Loren Hardeman III | | |
| 1979 | Apocalypse Now | Lieutenant Colonel Bill Kilgore | | |
| 1979 | The Great Santini | Bull Meechum | | |
| 1981 | True Confessions | Detective Sergeant Tom Spellacy | | |
| 1981 | The Pursuit of D.B. Cooper | Gruen | | |
| 1983 | Tender Mercies | Mac Sledge | Also co-producer | |
| 1983 | Angelo My Love | —N/a | Director, writer, and producer only | |
| 1984 | The Stone Boy | Joe Hillerman | | |
| 1984 | The Natural | Max Mercy | | |
| 1986 | Let's Get Harry | Norman Shrike | | |
| 1986 | Belizaire the Cajun | The Preacher | | |
| 1986 | The Lightship | Calvin Caspary | | |
| 1987 | Hotel Colonial | Roberto Carrasco | | |
| 1988 | Colors | Bob Hodges | | |
| 1990 | A Show of Force | Howard | | |
| 1990 | Days of Thunder | Harry Hogge | | |
| 1990 | The Handmaid's Tale | Commander | | |
| 1991 | Rambling Rose | Daddy | | |
| 1991 | Convicts | Soll Gautier | | |
| 1992 | Newsies | Joseph Pulitzer | | |
| 1992 | The Plague | Joseph Grand | | |
| 1993 | Falling Down | Prendergast | | |
| 1993 | Wrestling Ernest Hemingway | Walter | | |
| 1993 | Geronimo: An American Legend | Al Sieber | | |
| 1994 | The Paper | Bernie White | | |
| 1995 | Something to Talk About | Wyly King | | |
| 1995 | The Stars Fell on Henrietta | Mr. Cox | | |
| 1995 | The Scarlet Letter | Roger Chillingworth | | |
| 1996 | Sling Blade | Karl's Father | | |
| 1996 | A Family Thing | Earl Pilcher Jr. | Also producer | |
| 1996 | Phenomenon | Doc | | |
| 1997 | The Apostle | The Apostle E.F. | Also executive producer, writer and director | |
| 1998 | The Gingerbread Man | Dixon Doss | | |
| 1998 | A Civil Action | Jerome Facher | | |
| 1998 | Deep Impact | Spurgeon Tanner | | |
| 2000 | Gone in 60 Seconds | Otto Halliwell | | |
| 2000 | The 6th Day | Dr. Griffin Weir | | |
| 2000 | A Shot at Glory | Gordon McLeod | Also producer | |
| 2002 | John Q. | Lieutenant Frank Grimes | | |
| 2002 | Assassination Tango | John J. | Also producer, writer and director | |
| 2003 | Gods and Generals | General Robert E. Lee | | |
| 2003 | Secondhand Lions | Hub | | |
| 2003 | Open Range | Boss Spearman | | |
| 2005 | Kicking & Screaming | Buck Weston | | |
| 2005 | Thank You for Smoking | Captain | | |
| 2007 | Lucky You | L.C. Cheever | | |
| 2007 | We Own the Night | Burt Grusinsky | | |
| 2008 | Four Christmases | Howard | | |
| 2009 | Crazy Heart | Wayne | Also producer | |
| 2009 | The Road | Old Man | | |
| 2009 | Get Low | Felix Bush | Also executive producer | |
| 2011 | Seven Days in Utopia | Johnny Crawford | | |
| 2012 | Jayne Mansfield's Car | Jim Caldwell | | |
| 2012 | Casting By | Himself | Documentary | |
| 2012 | Jack Reacher | Cash | | |
| 2014 | A Night in Old Mexico | Red | | |
| 2014 | The Judge | Joseph Palmer | | |
| 2015 | Wild Horses | Scott Briggs | Also writer and director | |
| 2016 | In Dubious Battle | Bolton | | |
| 2018 | Widows | Tom Mulligan | | |
| 2021 | 12 Mighty Orphans | Mason Hawk | | |
| 2022 | Hustle | Rex Merrick | | |
| 2022 | The Pale Blue Eye | Jean-Pepe | | |

=== Television ===
Television credits
| Year | Title | Role | Notes | Refs. |
|---|---|---|---|---|
| 1959 | Armstrong Circle Theatre | Berks | Season 10 Episode 2: "Jailbreak" | |
| 1960 | Armstrong Circle Theatre | Tony Newman | Season 10 Episode 16: "Positive Identification" | |
| 1961 | The Defenders | Al Rogart | Season 1 Episode 12: "Perjury" | |
| 1961 | Shannon | Joey Nolan | Season 1 Episode 10: "Big Fish" | |
| 1961 | Cain's Hundred | Tom Nugent | Season 1 Episode 6: "King of the Mountain" | |
| 1961 | Route 66 | Roman | Season 1 Episode 25: "The Newborn" | |
| 1961 | Route 66 | Arnie | Season 2 Episode 4: "Birdcage on My Foot" | |
| 1961 | Naked City | Lewis Nunda | Season 2 Episode 13: "A Hole in the City" | |
| 1962 | Naked City | L. Francis Childe | Season 3 Episode 23: "The One Marked Hot Gives Cold" | |
| 1962 | Naked City | Johnny Meigs | Season 4 Episode 6: "Five Cranks for Winter... Ten Cranks for Spring" | |
| 1962 | Naked City | Barney Sonners | Season 4 Episode 8: "Torment Him Much and Hold Him Long" | |
| 1962 | Alfred Hitchcock Presents | Bart Conway | Season 7 Episode 14: "Bad Actor" | |
| 1963 | The Defenders | Luke Jackson | Season 2 Episode 24: "Metamorphosis" | |
| 1963 | Route 66 | Lee Winters | Season 3 Episode 18: "Suppose I Said I Was the Queen of Spain" | |
| 1963 | The Untouchables | Eddie Moon | Season 4 Episode 17: "Blues for a Gone Goose" | |
| 1963 | The Twilight Zone | Charley Parkes | Season 4 Episode 8: "Miniature" | |
| 1963 | The Virginian | Johnny Keel | Season 1 Episode 24: "Golden Door" | |
| 1963 | Stoney Burke | Joby Pierce | Season 1 Episode 23: "Joby" | |
| 1963 | Arrest and Trial | Morton Ware | Season 1 Episode 10: "Quality of Justice" | |
| 1963 | The Fugitive | Eric Christian | Season 1 Episode 4: "Never Wave Goodbye: Part 1" | |
| 1963 | The Fugitive | Eric Christian | Season 1 Episode 5: "Never Wave Goodbye: Part 2" | |
| 1964 | Kraft Suspense Theatre | Harvey Farnsworth | Season 1 Episode 22: "Portrait of an Unknown Man" | |
| 1964 | The Outer Limits | Louis Mace | Season 1 Episode 31: "The Chameleon" | |
| 1964 | The Outer Limits | Adam Ballard | Season 2 Episode 10: "The Inheritors: Part I" | |
| 1964 | The Outer Limits | Adam Ballard | Season 2 Episode 11: "The Inheritors: Part II" | |
| 1965 | The Defenders | Bill Andrews | Season 4 Episode 30: "Only a Child" | |
| 1965 | The Fugitive | Leslie Sessions | Season 2 Episode 16: "Brass Ring" | |
| 1965 | Voyage to the Bottom of the Sea | Zar | Season 1 Episode 20: "The Invaders" | |
| 1965 | Combat! | Karl | Season 3 Episode 16: "The Enemy" | |
| 1965 | The F.B.I. | Joseph Maurice Walker | Season 1 Episode 10: "The Giant Killer" | |
| 1966 | The F.B.I. | Johnny Albin | Season 2 Episode 5: "The Scourge" | |
| 1966 | Combat! | Peter Halsman | Season 5 Episode 14: "Cry for Help" | |
| 1966 | Bob Hope Presents the Chrysler Theatre | Frank Reeser | Season 3 Episode 15: "Guilty or Not Guilty" | |
| 1966 | Hawk | Dick Olmstead | Season 1 Episode 6: "Theory of the Innocent Bystander" | |
| 1966 | Felony Squad | Allie Froelich | Season 1 Episode 8: "Death of a Dream" | |
| 1966 | Shane | Tom Gary | Season 1 Episode 9: "Poor Tom's A-Cold" | |
| 1966 | T.H.E. Cat | Scorpio | Season 1 Episode 9: "Crossing at Destino Bay" | |
| 1966 | Fame Is the Name of the Game | Eddie Franchot | Television film | |
| 1967 | Combat! | Michel | Season 5 Episode 25: "The Partisan" | |
| 1967 | T.H.E. Cat | Laurent | Season 1 Episode 24: "The Long Chase" | |
| 1967 | The F.B.I. | Ernie Milden | Season 2 Episode 25: "The Executioners: Part 1" | |
| 1967 | The Time Tunnel | Raoul Nimon | Season 1 Episode 24: "Chase Through Time" | |
| 1967 | Cimarron Strip | Joe Wyman | Season 1 Episode 8: "The Roarer" | |
| 1967 | The Wild Wild West | Dr. Horace Humphries | Season 3 Episode 10: "The Night of the Falcon" | |
| 1968 | The F.B.I. | Joseph Troy | Season 4 Episode 9: "The Harvest" | |
| 1968 | CBS Playhouse | Dr. Margolin | Season 2 Episode 1: "The People Next Door" | |
| 1968 | Run for Your Life | Richard Fletcher | Season 3 Episode 19: "Killing Scene" | |
| 1968 | Judd, for the Defense | Raymond Cane | Season 1 Episode 24: "Square House" | |
| 1968 | Flesh and Blood | Howard | Television film | |
| 1969 | The F.B.I. | Gerald Wilson | Season 5 Episode 2: "Nightmare Road" | |
| 1969 | The Mod Squad | Matt Jenkins | Season 1 Episode 23: "Keep the Faith, Baby" | |
| 1979 | Ike | General Dwight D. Eisenhower | Miniseries | |
| 1983 | The Terry Fox Story | Bill Vigars | Television film | |
| 1989 | Lonesome Dove | Augustus "Gus" McCrae | Miniseries | |
| 1992 | Stalin | Joseph Stalin | Television film | |
| 1996 | The Man Who Captured Eichmann | Adolf Eichmann | Television film | |
| 1998 | Saturday Night Live | Various | Season 23 Episode 14: "Garth Brooks" | |
| 2005 | American Experience | Narrator | Season 17 Episode 11: "Carter Family: Will the Circle Be Unbroken" | |
| 2006 | Broken Trail | Prentice Ritter | Miniseries; also executive producer | |
| 2012 | Hemingway & Gellhorn | Russian General | Television film; uncredited cameo | |

=== Theatre ===
Theatre credits
| Year | Title | Role | Playwright | Venue | Refs. |
|---|---|---|---|---|---|
| 1966 | Wait Until Dark | Harry Roat Jr. | Frederick Knott | Ethel Barrymore Theatre, Broadway | |
| 1977 | American Buffalo | Walter Cole | David Mamet | Ethel Barrymore Theatre, Broadway | |

=== Video games ===
- The Godfather (2006) – voice role of Tom Hagen
- The Godfather II (2009) – voice role of Tom Hagen

== See also ==
- List of awards and nominations received by Robert Duvall

== Sources ==
- Meyer, Janet L. (August 13, 2015). Sydney Pollack: A Critical Filmography. McFarland. ISBN 978-1-4766-0979-9.
