= The Stone Boy =

The Stone Boy may refer:

- Iya Hokshi, a part of the Dakota myth and folklore
- Stone Boy (superhero), a fictional superhero in the DC Universe
- The Stone Boy (film), a 1984 film directed by Christopher Cain
- The Stone Boy (short story), a short story by the American author Gina Berriault
- The Stone Boy (TV series), a 1991 Indian television series on DD National
