= The Stone Boy (short story) =

Short story by Gina Berriault

"The Stone Boy" is a short story by American novelist and short story writer Gina Berriault. Written in 1957, the story was later published in her 1965 collection The Mistress and Other Short Stories and her 1996 collection Women in their Beds. Berriault adapted the story into a screenplay for the 1984 film of the same name starring Robert Duvall.

== Plot summary ==
Nine year old Arnold and his older brother Eugie set out to pick peas and potentially shoot ducks. While climbing through a fence near a lake, Arnold's gun becomes snarled and accidentally goes off. The bullet hits Eugie and kills him almost instantly. In a state of shock, Arnold decides to continue picking peas for the next hour before returning home to his parents and sister.

Upon arriving home, he tells them that Eugie is dead. An undertaker shortly arrives after Arnold's father discovers Eugie's body by the lake. Arnold overhears them while hiding in the barn. Later in the day, Arnold's father and his Uncle Andy take him into the sheriff's office in town where he is questioned. The sheriff tells Arnold's father that the boy might be stupid but more than likely has no feelings. Andy agrees with the sheriff telling him that Arnold never really cared for his brother.

When they arrive home the family have supper and nobody speaks. Soon after, the family are visited by neighbors. Despite feeling uncomfortable, Arnold remains in the room while his neighbors visit and listens to them tell stories about Eugie. He overhears his uncle Andy telling the neighbors what the sheriff said about him. Arnold later retreats to his bedroom, void of emotion or grief.

Later that night Arnold runs to his parents room with the intention of telling his mother how horrified he felt kneeling beside Eugie's dead body. His mother turns him away after he calls her name, telling him to go back to bed. Arnold is overcome with shame upon realizing he is naked.

The following morning at breakfast, Arnold's sister refuses to hand him a jug of milk before his father passes it to him. Arnold is relieved that his parents acknowledge his existence but the sheriff's words from the day before cause him to question his own morality. Before leaving the house, his mother asks him what he wanted during the night, to which he replies, “I didn’t want nothing.” He then leaves the house frightened by his own words.
