= List of awards and nominations received by Robert Duvall =

Robert Duvall awards and nominations
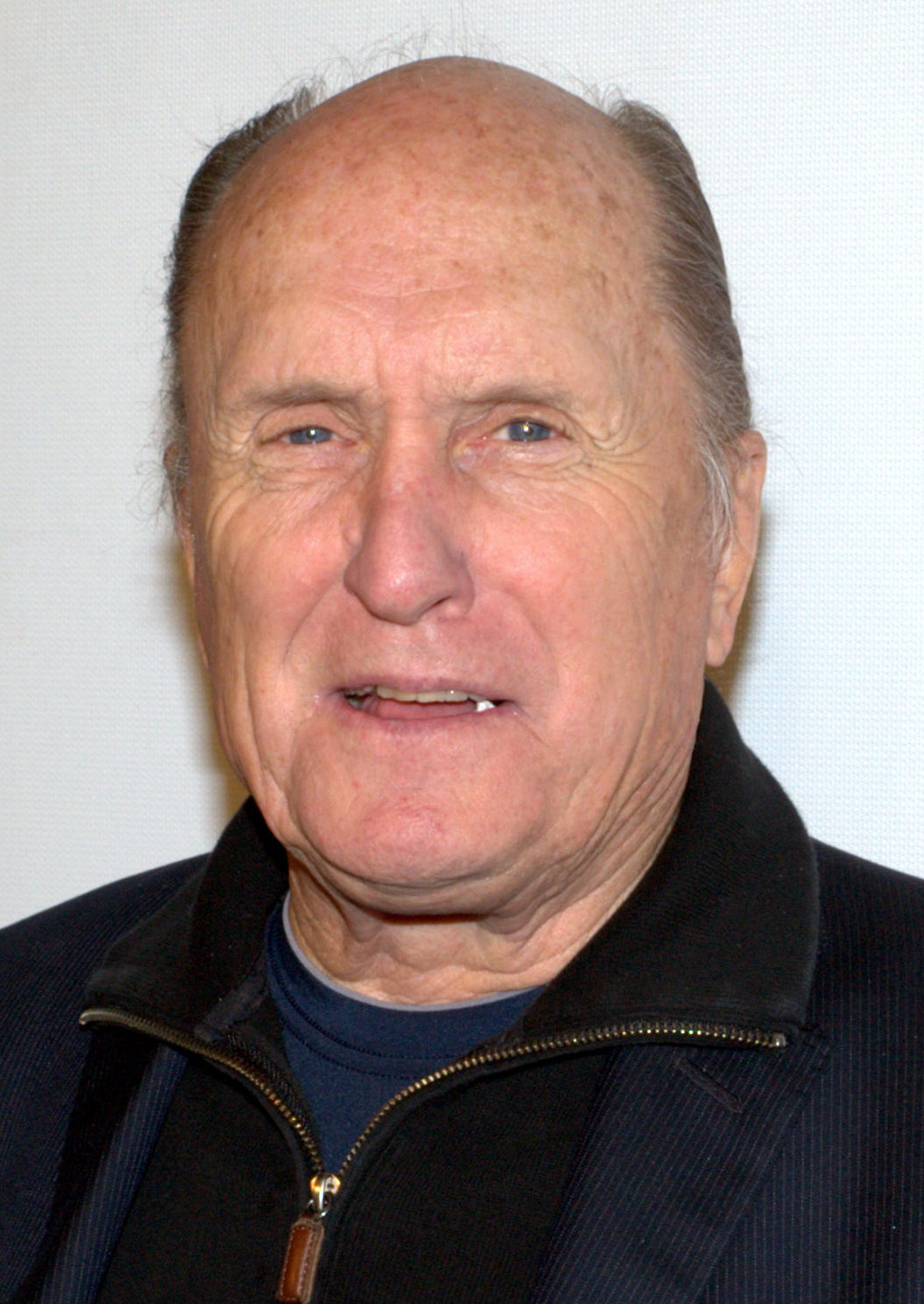
- Duvall in 2010
Awards and nominations
Major Awards	Wins	Nominations
Academy Awards	1	7
British Academy Film Awards	1	3
Golden Globe Awards	4	7
Primetime Emmy Awards	2	5
Actor Awards	1	7
Wins	59
Nominations	128

This is a List of awards and nominations received by Robert Duvall

Robert Duvall was an American actor and filmmaker who has received numerous accolades including an Academy Award, a British Academy Film Award, two Primetime Emmy Awards, four Golden Globe Awards, and an Actor Award.

He won the Academy Award for Best Actor for his role as an alcoholic former country music star in the drama Tender Mercies (1983). He was Oscar-nominated for his roles in Francis Ford Coppola's crime film The Godfather (1972), Coppola's Vietnam War epic Apocalypse Now (1979), the dramas The Great Santini (1979) and The Apostle (1997), as well as the legal thrillers A Civil Action (1998) and The Judge (2014). He received the BAFTA Award and Golden Globe Award for his role as the tough and unflinching Lieutenant Colonel William "Bill" Kilgore in the Apocalypse Now (1979). He won the Actor Award for playing an attorney in A Civil Action (1998).

For his television roles, he won two Primetime Emmy Awards including for Outstanding Lead Actor in a Limited or Anthology Series or Movie for his role as an aging cowboy in the AMC western miniseries Broken Trail (2006). He was previously Emmy-nominated for playing former Texas Ranger Captain Augustus "Gus" McCrae in the CBS western miniseries Lonesome Dove (1989), Joseph Stalin in the HBO television film Stalin (1992), and the dual role of Adolf Eichmann / Ricardo Klement in the TNT film The Man Who Captured Eichmann (1996).

== Major associations ==
=== Academy Awards ===
Year	Category	Nominated work	Result	Ref.
1973	Best Supporting Actor	The Godfather	Nominated	
1980	Best Supporting Actor	Apocalypse Now	Nominated	
1981	Best Actor	The Great Santini	Nominated	
1984	Best Actor	Tender Mercies	Won	
1998	Best Actor	The Apostle	Nominated	
1999	Best Supporting Actor	A Civil Action	Nominated	
2015	Best Supporting Actor	The Judge	Nominated	

=== BAFTA Awards ===
British Academy Film Awards
Year	Category	Nominated work	Result	Ref.
1973	Best Actor in a Supporting Role	The Godfather	Nominated	
1978	Best Actor in a Supporting Role	Network	Nominated	
1980	Best Actor in a Supporting Role	Apocalypse Now	Won	

=== Emmy Awards ===
Primetime Emmy Awards
Year	Category	Nominated work	Result	Ref.
1989	Outstanding Lead Actor in a Miniseries or a Special	Lonesome Dove	Nominated	
1993	Outstanding Lead Actor in a Miniseries or a Special	Stalin	Nominated	
1997	Outstanding Lead Actor in a Miniseries or a Special	The Man Who Captured Eichmann	Nominated	
2007	Outstanding Miniseries	Broken Trail	Won	
2007	Outstanding Lead Actor in a Miniseries or Movie	Broken Trail	Won	

=== Golden Globe Awards ===
Year	Category	Nominated work	Result	Ref.
1980	Best Supporting Actor – Motion Picture	Apocalypse Now	Won	
1984	Best Actor in a Motion Picture – Drama	Tender Mercies	Won	
1990	Best Actor in a Miniseries or Television Film	Lonesome Dove	Won	
1993	Best Actor in a Miniseries or Television Film	Stalin	Won	
1999	Best Supporting Actor – Motion Picture	A Civil Action	Nominated	
2007	Best Actor in a Miniseries or Television Film	Broken Trail	Nominated	
2015	Best Supporting Actor – Motion Picture	The Judge	Nominated	

=== Actor Awards ===
Year	Category	Nominated work	Result	Ref.
1997	Outstanding Actor in a Television Movie or Miniseries	The Man Who Captured Eichmann	Nominated	
1997	Outstanding Ensemble in a Motion Picture	Sling Blade	Nominated	
1998	Outstanding Actor in a Leading Role	The Apostle	Nominated	
1999	Outstanding Actor in a Supporting Role	A Civil Action	Won	
2007	Outstanding Actor in a Television Movie or Miniseries	Broken Trail	Nominated	
2010	Outstanding Actor in a Leading Role	Get Low	Nominated	
2015	Outstanding Actor in a Supporting Role	The Judge	Nominated	

== Miscellaneous accolades ==
=== American Movie Awards ===
Year	Category	Nominated work	Result
1979	Best Supporting Actor	Apocalypse Now	Won

=== Blockbuster Entertainment Awards ===
Year	Category	Nominated work	Result
1998	Favorite Supporting Actor - Drama	A Civil Action	Nominated
1998	Favorite Supporting Actor - Sci-Fi	Deep Impact	Nominated

=== Cable ACE Award ===
Year	Category	Nominated work	Result
1983	Best Actor in a Dramatic Presentation	The Terry Fox Story	Nominated
1996	Best Actor in a Movie or Miniseries	The Man Who Captured Eichmann	Nominated

=== Chicago Film Critics Association ===
Year	Category	Nominated work	Result
1997	Best Actor	The Apostle	Won
1998	Best Supporting Actor	A Civil Action	Nominated

=== Critics' Choice Awards ===
Year	Category	Nominated work	Result
2009	Best Movie Actor	Get Low	Nominated
2014	Best Movie Supporting Actor	The Judge	Nominated

=== Dallas-Fort Worth Film Critics Association ===
Year	Category	Nominated work	Result
2009	Best Actor	Get Low	Nominated

=== Deauville American Film Festival ===
Year	Category	Nominated work	Result
2002	Special Grand Prize	Assassination Tango	Nominated

=== Florida Film Critics Circle ===
Year	Category	Nominated work	Result
1997	Best Actor	The Apostle	Won
1998	Best Supporting Actor	A Civil Action	Won

=== Monte-Carlo Television Festival ===
Year	Category	Nominated work	Result
2006	Best Performance by an Actor in a Miniseries	Broken Trail	Nominated

=== Grace Award ===
Year	Category	Nominated work	Result
2011	Most Inspiring Performance in Movies	Seven Days in Utopia	Nominated

=== Hollywood Film Awards ===
Year	Category	Nominated work	Result
2014	Hollywood Supporting Actor Award	The Judge	Won

=== Independent Spirit Awards ===
Year	Category	Nominated work	Result
1991	Best Male Lead	Rambling Rose	Nominated
1997	Best Director	The Apostle	Won
1997	Best Male Lead	The Apostle	Won
1997	Best Screenplay	The Apostle	Nominated
2009	Best First Feature	Crazy Heart	Won

=== Kansas City Film Critics Circle ===
Year	Category	Nominated work	Result
1979	Best Actor	The Great Santini	Won
1983	Best Actor	Tender Mercies	Won

=== Las Vegas Film Critics Society ===
Year	Category	Nominated work	Result
1997	Best Actor	The Apostle	Won
2009	Best Actor	Get Low	Nominated

=== Los Angeles Film Critics Association ===
Year	Category	Nominated work	Result
1983	Best Actor	Tender Mercies	Won
1991	Best Supporting Actor	Rambling Rose	Nominated
1997	Best Actor	The Apostle	Won

=== Milan International Film Festival ===
Year	Category	Nominated work	Result
2011	Best Supporting Actor	Seven Days in Utopia	Nominated

=== Montréal World Film Festival ===
Year	Category	Nominated work	Result
1979	Best Actor	The Great Santini	Won

=== National Cowboy and Western Heritage Museum ===
Year	Category	Nominated work	Result
2020	Lifetime Achievement Award	Western Heritage Awards	Honored

=== National Society of Film Critics ===
Year	Category	Nominated work	Result
1972	Best Supporting Actor	The Godfather	Nominated
1976	Best Supporting Actor	The Seven-Per-Cent Solution	Nominated
1976	Best Supporting Actor	Network	Nominated
1979	Best Actor	The Great Santini	Nominated
1983	Best Actor	Tender Mercies	Nominated
1997	Best Actor	The Apostle	Won

=== New York Film Critics Circle ===
Year	Category	Nominated work	Result
1972	Best Supporting Actor	The Godfather	Won
1979	Best Actor	The Great Santini	Nominated
1981	Best Actor	True Confessions	Nominated
1983	Best Actor	Tender Mercies	Won
1997	Best Actor	The Apostle	Nominated

=== New York Independent Film and Video Festival ===
Year	Category	Nominated work	Result
2006	Best Performance	Broken Trail	Won

=== Phoenix Film Critics Society ===
Year	Category	Nominated work	Result
2009	Best Actor	Get Low	Nominated

=== Satellite Awards ===
Year	Category	Nominated work	Result
1997	Best Actor - Motion Picture	The Apostle	Won
1998	Best Supporting Actor - Motion Picture	A Civil Action	Nominated
2009	Best Actor - Motion Picture	Get Low	Nominated
2014	Best Supporting Actor - Motion Picture	The Judge	Nominated

=== Society of Texas Film Critics ===
Year	Category	Nominated work	Result
1997	Best Actor	The Apostle	Won

=== St. Louis Gateway Film Critics Association ===
Year	Category	Nominated work	Result
2009	Best Supporting Actor	The Road	Nominated

=== Toronto Film Critics Association ===
Year	Category	Nominated work	Result
1997	Best Actor	The Apostle	Nominated

=== Utah Film Critics Association ===
Year	Category	Nominated work	Result
1983	Best Actor	Tender Mercies	Won

=== Washington D.C. Area Film Critics Association ===
Year	Category	Nominated work	Result
2009	Best Actor	Get Low	Nominated
