= Ike (miniseries) =

- Genre: Historical Drama
- Written by: Melville Shavelson
- Directed by: Boris Sagal and Melville Shavelson
- Starring: Robert Duvall; Lee Remick
- Composer: Fred Karlin
- Country of origin: United States
- Original language: English
- No. of episodes: 3

Production
- Producer: Bill McCutchen
- Editors: Paul Dixon; Bill Lenny; Kent Schafer; John Woodcock
- Running time: 291 minutes

Original release
- Network: ABC
- Release: May 3 – May 6, 1979

Ike, also known as Ike: The War Years, is a 1979 television miniseries about the life of Dwight D. Eisenhower, mostly focusing on his time as Supreme Commander in Europe during World War II. The screenplay, written by Melville Shavelson, was based on Kay Summersby's 1948 memoir Eisenhower Was My Boss and her 1975 autobiography, Past Forgetting: My Love Affair.

Directed by Boris Sagal and Melville Shavelson, the production starred Robert Duvall as Eisenhower and Lee Remick as Kay Summersby. Film editors John Woodcock and Bill Lenny won an Eddie Award for their work and the series garnered five Emmy Award nominations.

== Cast ==
- Robert Duvall: Gen. Dwight D. Eisenhower
- Vernon Dobtcheff: Gen. Charles de Gaulle
- Darren McGavin: Gen. George S. Patton
- Lee Remick: Kay Summersby
- Wensley Pithey: Winston Churchill
- Terence Alexander: Gen. Arthur Tedder
- Dana Andrews: Gen. George C. Marshall
- Richard Herd: Gen. Omar Bradley
- Paul Gleason: Capt. Ernest "Tex" Lee
- Bonnie Bartlett: Mamie Eisenhower
- William Schallert: Gen. Mark Clark
- Whit Bissell: Admiral
- William Boyett: Gen. Ward Hoffenberg
- K. Callan: Mrs Westerfield
- J.D. Cannon: Gen. Walter Bedell Smith
- David de Keyser: Field Marshal Sir Alan Brooke
- Don Fellows: Gen. Carl Spaatz
- Ian Richardson: Field Marshal Sir Bernard Montgomery
- Mark Kingston: Air Chief Marshal Sir Trafford Leigh-Mallory
- Wolfgang Preiss: Gen. Alfred Jodl
- Martin Jarvis: King George VI
- Maurice Marsac: Gen. Henri Giraud
- Clifford Earl: Lord Louis Mountbatten
- Francis Matthews: Noël Coward
- Stephen Roberts: Franklin D. Roosevelt
