= Women in Their Beds =

1996 short story collection by Gina Berriault

First edition (publ. Counterpoint)

Women in Their Beds is a short story collection by Gina Berriault. It received the 1996 National Book Critics Circle Award and the 1997 PEN/Faulkner Award for Fiction.
