= Gina Berriault =

American novelist, short story writer

Gina Berriault (January 1, 1926 – July 15, 1999) was an American novelist and short story writer.

== Biography ==
Berriault was born in Long Beach, California, to Russian-Jewish immigrant parents. Her father was a freelance writer and Berriault took her inspiration from him, using his stand-up typewriter to write her first stories while still in grammar school.

Berriault had a prolific writing career, which included stories, novels and screenplays. Her writing tended to focus on life in and around San Francisco. She published four novels and three collections of short stories, including Women in Their Beds: New & Selected Stories (1996), which won the PEN/Faulkner Award, the National Book Critics Circle Award and the Bay Area Book Reviewers Award. In 1997 Berriault was chosen as winner of the Rea Award for the Short Story, for outstanding achievement in that genre.

Berriault taught writing at the Iowa Writers Workshop and San Francisco State University. She also received a grant from the National Endowment for the Arts, a Guggenheim Fellowship, an Ingram-Merrill Fellowship, a Commonwealth Gold Medal for Literature, the Pushcart Prize and several O'Henry prizes.

She adapted her short story "The Stone Boy" for a film of the same title, released in 1984. The same story had previously been adapted by another writer for a 1960 television presentation.

== Death and legacy ==
Berriault died in 1999, at age 73, at Marin General Hospital in Greenbrae, California. The Gina Berriault Award, created by Peter Orner and Fourteen Hills Review at San Francisco State University in 2009, honors Berriault's legacy.

== Bibliography ==
Novels

- The Descent (1960)
- A Conference of Victims (1962)
- The Son (1966)
- The Lights of Earth (1984)

Story collections

- Short Story (1958; a Scribner's showcase volume for four then-new writers: Berriault, Richard Yates, Seymour Epstein and Bonnie Barnett).
- The Mistress and Other Stories (1965)
- The Infinite Passion of Expectation: Twenty-five Stories (1982)
- Women in Their Beds: New & Selected Stories (1996)
