= The Stone Boy (film) =

1984 film directed by Christopher Cain

- Theatrical release poster
- Directed by: Christopher Cain
- Written by: Gina Berriault
- Produced by: Joe Roth; Ivan Bloch
- Starring: Robert Duvall; Frederic Forrest; Glenn Close; Wilford Brimley
- Cinematography: Juan Ruiz Anchía
- Edited by: Paul Rubell
- Music by: James Horner
- Distributed by: 20th Century Fox
- Release date: April 6, 1984 (United States)
- Running time: 91 minutes
- Country: United States
- Language: English
- Budget: $2.5 million
- Box office: $261,033

The Stone Boy is a 1984 American drama film directed by Christopher Cain and starring Robert Duvall, Frederic Forrest, Glenn Close and Wilford Brimley. It is based on the 1957 short story "The Stone Boy" by American author Gina Berriault.

== Plot ==
The Hillerman family copes with the aftermath of the death of one of their children in a hunting accident.

== Cast ==
- Robert Duvall ... Joe Hillerman
- Jason Presson ... Arnold Hillerman
- Glenn Close ... Ruth Hillerman
- Susan Blackstone ... Nora Hillerman
- Dean Cain ... Eugene Hillerman
- Frederic Forrest ... Andy Jansen
- Cindy Fisher ... Amalie
- Gail Youngs ... Lu Jansen
- Wilford Brimley ... George Jansen
- Mary Ellen Trainor ... Doris Simms
- Linda Hamilton ... Eva Crescent Moon Lady
- Tom Waits ... Petrified man at carnival (cameo)

== Production ==
Principal photography began on June 28, 1983. Filming took place in and around the area of Cascade, Montana where the Hillerman farm is located. The Hillerman Ranch had been abandoned for years, so the crew had to paint, furnish the house and groom the yard before production began.

Filming was also conducted in the town of Cascade, including at Hillside Cemetery, Cascade's Sportsman's Club, and the local park for a carnival sequence. More than 200 local area residents were hired for stand ins and speaking roles. Next they traveled to Great Falls, Montana to begin filming in the city, at a local truck stop just north of town, the bus station, and a saloon. Reshoots were frequently required because of problems and delays. Production wrapped in late July and early August 1983.

== Release ==
The Stone Boy was released on April 6, 1984, in New York and in select cities. It was pulled from movie theaters after a week. It grossed $261,033 in its run.

== Reception ==
On Rotten Tomatoes, it has an approval rating of 67% based on reviews from 6 critics, with an average of 6.5/10.

== Home media ==
The Stone Boy was released on video by CBS Fox Video. The DVD was released by Anchor Bay on May 17, 2005.
