= Iya Hokshi =

Iya Hokshi, also spelled Į'yą hoksi'la, Iya Hoksila or referred to as Stone Boy, is a legend in Sioux mythology.

== Story ==
Once there were five brothers. A woman appeared and the youngest brother invited her to be their elder sister. The brothers went deep into the forest to hunt but one by one they did not come back. The sister was sad, and picked up a pebble and put it in her mouth. One day, while weeping, she accidentally swallowed it. She gave birth to a boy, after four successive days of tossing him out, each day he returning bigger and older, and his name was Į'yą hoksi'la, or Stone Boy. Eventually he asked why they lived alone. His mother explained that the uncles never returned from their journey. Stone Boy left to find them, despite his mother's pleas to not go.

Stone Boy saw the tipi of an old woman. She asked him if he could step on her back, to relieve the pain, like his uncles had. Stone Boy realized that this witch had taken his uncles. Stone Boy agrees to step on her back, and he does so with so much weight, she says "O Grandson, that's enough". But he continues and he kills her. Inside the tipi he found his 5 uncles, and revived them using a sweat bath (note—this sweat lodge medicine was described in earlier tales). He takes his uncles home and his mother sees them and is happy.
