= Seven Days in Utopia =

2011 Christian sports film by Matt Russell

- Theatrical release poster
- Directed by: Matt Russell
- Written by: David Cook; Rob Levine; Matt Russell; Sandra Thrift
- Based on: Golf's Sacred Journey: Seven Days at the Links of Utopia by David L. Cook
- Produced by: Jason Michael Berman; Mark G. Mathis
- Starring: Robert Duvall; Lucas Black; Melissa Leo
- Cinematography: M. David Mullen
- Edited by: Robert Komatsu
- Music by: Klaus Badelt; Christopher Carmichael
- Production company: Utopia Pictures & Television
- Release date: September 2, 2011
- Running time: 98 minutes
- Country: United States
- Language: English
- Budget: $7.5 million
- Box office: $4.4 million

Seven Days in Utopia is a 2011 American Christian sports drama film directed by Matt Russell, starring Robert Duvall, Lucas Black, and Melissa Leo. The film is based on the book Golf's Sacred Journey: Seven Days at the Links of Utopia by Dr. David Lamar Cook, a psychologist who received a Ph.D. in Sport and Performance Psychology from the University of Virginia.

It was filmed in Utopia, Texas, and Fredericksburg, Texas, and was released in the United States on September 2, 2011, to mixed reviews.

== Plot ==
Luke Chisholm, a young professional golfer, has a meltdown during a tournament. After shooting 80 in the final round, Chisholm crashes his car into a fence and finds himself stuck in Utopia, Texas while his car is repaired. He gets wisdom from retired golfer Johnny Crawford.

After some instruction and guidance, Chisholm reconciles with his overbearing father and enters the Valero Texas Open. He ends up in a playoff with the world's top golfer, T.K. Oh.

== Cast ==
- Robert Duvall as Johnny Crawford
- Lucas Black as Luke Chisholm
- Melissa Leo as Lily
- K. J. Choi as T.K. Oh
- Kelly Tilghman as Golf Channel Reporter / Analyst
- Brandel Chamblee as Golf Channel Reporter / Analyst
- Deborah Ann Woll as Sarah
- Brian Geraghty as Jake
- Rickie Fowler as himself
- Stewart Cink as himself
- Rich Beem as himself

== Reception ==
The film earned negative reviews from professional critics. On the review aggregator website Rotten Tomatoes, 23% of 56 critics' reviews are positive. The website's consensus reads: "Seven Days in Utopia finds a noteworthy cast struggling to engage with lackadaisical drama, overwrought themes, and a predictably staged narrative." The Arizona Republic described Seven Days as "utterly predictable" and "bland," but also praised Duvall, who "has to be great here just to keep the movie afloat." Roger Ebert of the Chicago Sun-Times gave the film one star out of four, writing "I would rather eat a golf ball than see this movie again" and, of Duvall, "Only a great actor could give such a bad performance."

== Ending and online component ==
Seven Days in Utopia concludes without revealing whether the protagonist, Luke Chisholm, successfully makes a critical putt during a professional golf tournament. Instead, the film directs viewers to an external website, didhemaketheputt.com, where the outcome is addressed in a video of David L. Cook reading the first chapter of the sequel to Golf's Sacred Journey. The site also included religious content, such as a section called "Bury Your Lies", a prayer for guidance, a video tour of Utopia, Texas, and a store for purchasing related materials. As of 2026, the URL redirects to a page on the "Links of Utopia" website containing the original video.

Director Matthew Dean Russell stated that the decision to leave the ending open-ended was intentional, aligning with the film's themes of faith and personal growth. He explained that the website was developed by author and producer David L. Cook, along with Visio Entertainment, to provide a space for further engagement without incorporating overt religious messaging directly into the film. Russell described the approach as a way to respect diverse audiences while allowing those interested to explore the film's faith-based message further.
