= Stalin (1992 film) =

Television film directed by Ivan Passer

- Promotional poster
- Genre: Biographical drama Political drama Political thriller
- Written by: Paul Monash
- Directed by: Ivan Passer
- Starring: Robert Duvall; Julia Ormond; Joan Plowright; Jeroen Krabbé
- Theme music composer: Stanisław Syrewicz
- Country of origin: United States
- Original language: English

Production
- Producer: Mark Carliner
- Production locations: Moscow; Budapest
- Cinematography: Vilmos Zsigmond
- Editor: Peter Davies
- Running time: 172 minutes
- Production company: HBO Pictures
- Budget: 10 million

Original release
- Network: HBO
- Release: November 21, 1992

Stalin is a 1992 American political drama television film starring Robert Duvall as Soviet leader Joseph Stalin. Produced by HBO Pictures and directed by Ivan Passer, it tells the story of Stalin's rise to power until his death and spans the period from 1917 to 1953. Owing to Soviet leader Mikhail Gorbachev's policies of glasnost and perestroika, producer Mark Carliner was able to receive permission to film in the Kremlin, becoming the first feature film to do so. The film premiered on HBO on November 21, 1992.

Filming was done in Budapest and the Soviet Union with extraordinary access to Soviet historic sites in the weeks before its dissolution. Although the film was almost entirely shot on location and producer Mark Carliner insisted that the film "reflect the truth", several scholars and historians commented that the film focused less on history and more on Stalin's character. This was seen as a flaw by many film critics, while still praising Robert Duvall's performance as Stalin. Julia Ormond's portrayal of Nadezhda Alliluyeva and Vilmos Zsigmond's camera work were also singled out for praise.

The film received several accolades, including four Primetime Emmy Awards (including Outstanding Made for Television Movie) and three Golden Globe Awards.

== Synopsis ==
Svetlana Alliluyeva, daughter of Joseph Stalin, recounts her father returning from his Siberian exile to enlist in World War I, but being rejected for service. Stalin continues to fight against the tsar, and in 1917, stands at the train platform with his comrades awaiting the return of Vladimir Lenin. The October Revolution results in a new government being formed in Russia under the leadership of Lenin. The young Nadezhda Alliluyeva is hired as secretary for the new Bolshevik leaders. She admires Stalin's exploits during the revolution and marries him.

Stalin is resolute and ruthless, having several officers murdered, which prompts Leon Trotsky to complain to Lenin. To the intellectual Trotsky's displeasure, Lenin defends Stalin and his methods. A power struggle develops between him and Stalin over Lenin's legacy. When Lenin suffers a stroke, Stalin uses every opportunity to expel Trotsky and position himself as his successor. He surrounds himself with loyal companions, such as Grigory Zinoviev and Lev Kamenev. After Lenin's death, Stalin becomes the new ruler of the Soviet Union. As one of his first acts, he exiles Trotsky from the country.

Stalin begins dekulakization and crushes all resistance with the secret police which undergoes several internal purges, eventually being headed by Lavrentiy Beria. When Stalin's son from his first marriage Yakov Dzhugashvili attempts suicide over his father's refusal to approve his marriage to a Jew, Nadezhda is struck by her husband's growing inhumanity and returns to her parents' home. She considers leaving him but fears for her parents' fates if she does so, eventually returning to Moscow. During her train journey through the country, Nadezhda sees many farmers being shot or deported and defies her husband at a boisterous celebration. Stalin chastises and deliberately humiliates her, causing Nadezhda to leave and commit suicide. Her loss leaves Stalin in silent grief and anger for "betraying" him. He pushes ahead with a massive industrialization of the Soviet Union with ever new large-scale projects in order to develop the country into a world power.

Resistance to Stalin begins building up in Leningrad, spurred by the local official Sergei Kirov. Stalin sees him as a competitor and successfully eliminates him. After the assassination, he uses show trials to stage the Great Purge, killing and imprisoning many of his critics and former allies, who are forced to denounce each other to save themselves. Nikolai Bukharin notes the growing darkness over the country and expresses doubt about the legitimacy of the trials. Amongst those eventually killed are Bukharin himself, Sergo Ordzhonikidze (Stalin's close friend), Zinoviev, and Kamenev.

Stalin watches the annexation of Austria by Nazi Germany, admiring Hitler's will to get what he wants. He adamantly refuses to believe that Hitler will invade the Soviet Union and is shocked when it happens in June 1941. After Stalin has digested the shock, he prepares a counter-offensive, vowing not to surrender. His son, now an artillery officer, is captured by the Germans, who Stalin denies knowledge of. After the victory over Germany, Stalin withdraws more and more from the public eye and sees only conspiracies even amongst his inner circle. His only regret on his deathbed remains Nadezhda's suicide.

Svetlana Alliluyeva visits her father's body lying in state, while the film notes that Stalin's crimes caused the deaths of millions of Soviet citizens.

== Cast ==
- Robert Duvall as Joseph Stalin
- Julia Ormond as Nadezhda Alliluyeva
- Maximilian Schell as Vladimir Lenin
- Jeroen Krabbé as Nikolai Bukharin
- Joan Plowright as Olga Alliluyeva
- Frank Finlay as Sergei Alliluyev
- Daniel Massey as Leon Trotsky
- András Bálint as Grigory Zinoviev
- Emil Wolk as Lev Kamenev
- Roshan Seth as Lavrentiy Beria
- Mátyás Usztics as Nikolai Yezhov
- John Bowe as Kliment Voroshilov
- Jim Carter as Sergo Ordzhonikidze
- Murray Ewan as Nikita Khrushchev
- Stella Gonet as Zinaida Pavlutskaya Ordzhonikidze
- Elena Seropova as Nino Beria
- Colin Jeavons as Genrikh Yagoda
- Miriam Margolyes as Nadezhda Krupskaya
- Kevin McNally as Sergei Kirov
- Clive Merrison as Vyacheslav Molotov
- Lisa Orgolini as Anya Larina
- Ravil Isyanov as Yakov Dzhugashvili
- Joanna Roth as Svetlana Alliluyeva
- Aleksandr Feklistov as Leonid Nikolaev
- Stanislav Strelkov as Vasily Stalin
- Vsevolod Larionov as Dr. Lukomsky
- Oleg Tabakov as Dr. Vinogradov (credited as Oleg Tobakov)
- Levan Uchaneishvili as Lazar Kaganovich

== Background ==
=== Inspiration ===
The idea of a film about Stalin occurred during an American Broadcasting Company (ABC) broadcast of the TV film Disaster at Silo 7 produced by Mark Carliner, which was seen by a member of an official Russian delegation during their stay in the United States. Enthusiastic about the anti-nuclear topic, she invited Carliner to Russia for several seminars and demonstrations. When Carliner visited the country, the film was broadcast on Russian television and well received. This later enabled Carliner to obtain filming permits for original locations.

Carliner had studied Russian history at Princeton University, and credits his Russian heritage for his motivation to film the movie. He presented the project to ABC and was rejected on the grounds that it was "too expensive and too risky". Only the chairman of the cable channel Home Box Office (HBO) Michael J. Fuchs, who had considered making a film about Stalin, agreed to take on the project. It took two more years of research with the assistance of Soviet officials specialising in Stalin's era to access to archives and historical recordings, to write the script.

In July 1991, the project was presented as "the first honest, very personal reckoning with the controversial, dictatorial godfather of the Soviet Union". Carliner emphasized that it would not only be a historical biography, but also a gangster film. According to various sources, a production budget of between 9.5 million and 10 million US dollars was allocated for the film.

=== Casting and director ===
According to Carliner, Al Pacino was among several actors who expressed an interest in the lead, which eventually went to Robert Duvall. Duvall had turned down the offer to play Stalin in Andrei Konchalovsky's feature film The Inner Circle three months earlier, which is said to have been due to different salary expectations. When Duvall was offered the lead by Carliner, he agreed to take up the role. Carliner noted that Duvall was not his first choice, as his body constitution was more similar to Lenin's.

Duvall was keen to have Czech director Ivan Passer direct and fought for his appointment. Although the producers didn't like it, Passer was eventually hired very late into the project. Having fled his native country during the Prague Spring, Passer had a special relationship with the project.

=== Makeup ===
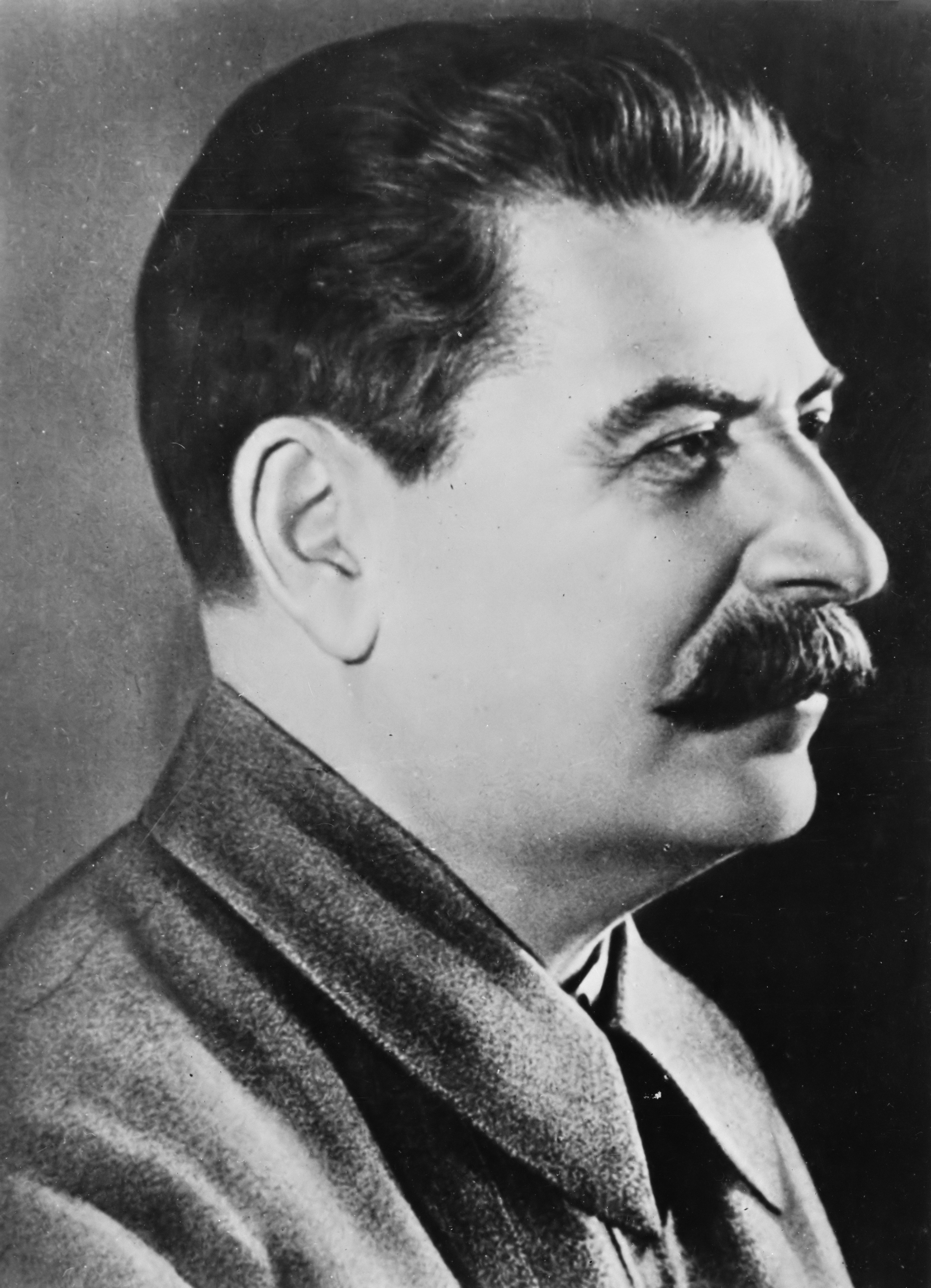
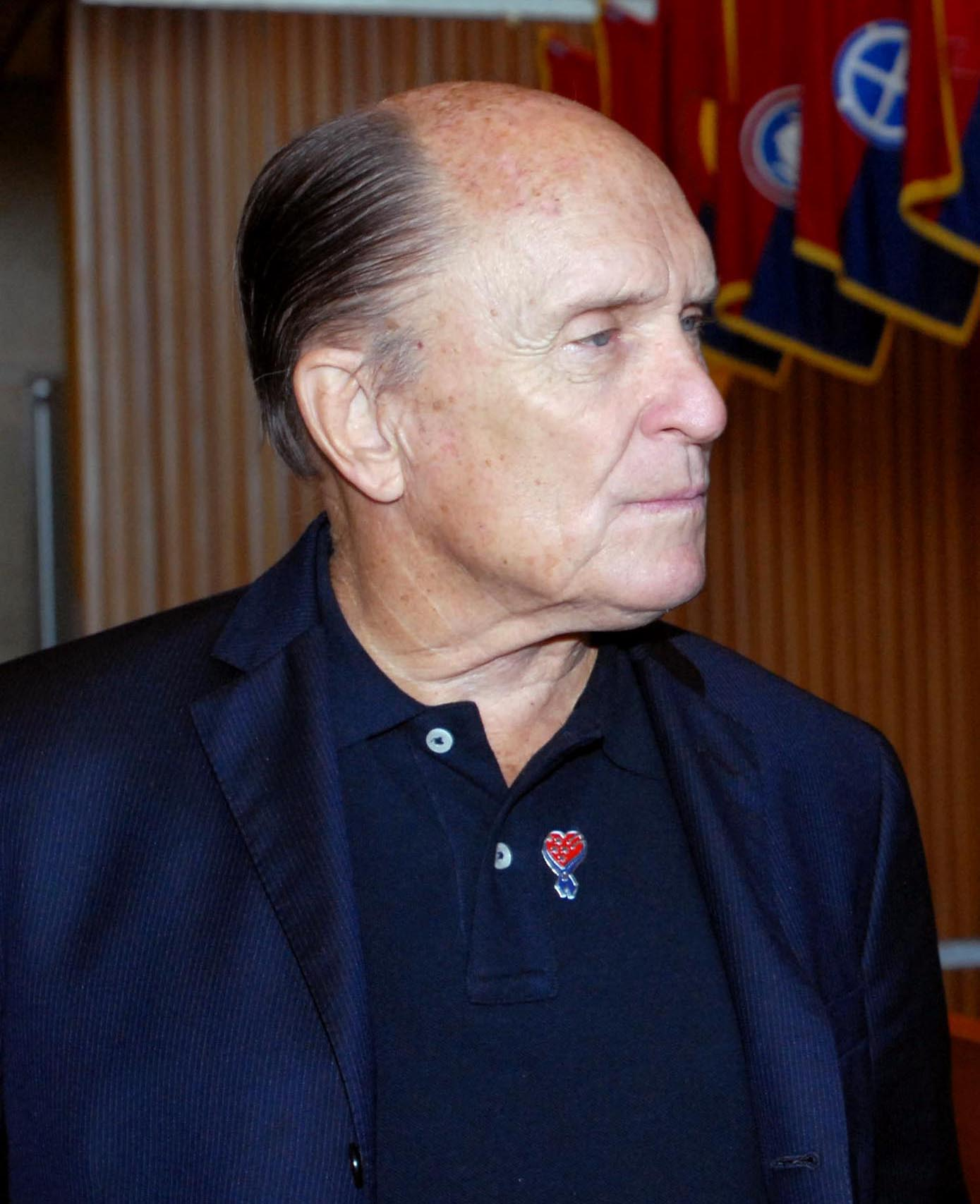
Profile pictures of Joseph Stalin (left) and Robert Duvall

To recreate Stalin's likeness on Duvall, make-up specialist and Oscar winner Stephan Dupuis was hired. He faced the challenge of transforming Duvall's blue eyes, which are deep-set and soft-looking, his bald head, and small nose into Stalin's coarse face, dark skin, and brown, slightly Mongolian eyes. To do this, he studied photos of both men to determine the differences in facial contours. He drove to Duvall's ranch, made an impression of his face, and then made a clay mask from it at home. Taking into account the different parts of the skin, the right colours, wig, nasal prosthesis, false eyebrows and moustache, he eventually accomplished the task. The final product was completed only a week before shooting began. A mobile studio was used during filming in Russia to create the masks.

=== Pre-production ===
On the eve of August 18, 1991, Passer and Carliner were in Moscow looking for suitable locations. They stayed at the Oktyabrskaya Hotel, which turned out to be the main headquarters of the opposition that initiated the August coup in Moscow the next morning. When the military took up positions around the Kremlin, they immediately fled Russia for Hungary, fearing being mistakened for enemy CIA agents. Arriving in Budapest, Carliner believed that "two years of work to get the filming permits went up in smoke" and the film could not be made. Passer suggested shooting the film in Budapest instead. The next day, Leonid Vereshchagin, a cultural adviser to the Russian government, called and said that the coup would be over in about ten days. He urged Carliner to shoot in Russia at all costs. Well aware of the propaganda value that could be made of the film against opposition critics, the filmmakers were promised all support and invited back to Moscow three days after the attempted coup was over. Several interior scenes were shot in Hungary, before the full film crew returned to Moscow about a month later. On November 6, Carliner returned with Schell, the actor for Lenin.

=== Script ===
In 1991, Carliner hired screenwriter Paul Jarrico to revise Paul Monash's screenplay. Jarrico had joined the American Communist Party in 1939 and been blacklisted for his political views during the McCarthy era. Carliner hoped that Jarrico would have a "unique connection to the material" and "benefit the project from his revisions". Jarrico was to receive a fee of $30,000 for the revisions and an additional $10,000 for a final review if required.

Jarrico cut 26 pages from Monash's script, which was about four hours long. He rewrote the beginning and fundamentally changed the scenes in which fears of Sergei Kirov's assassination are expressed. Nikolai Bukharin's role was expanded and his speech against forced collectivization extended, in addition to a call for a return to Leninism. He also added two scenes where Stalin discusses the usefulness of a treaty with Germany with his diplomat Maxim Litvinov, refusing to believe that Germany would attack the Soviet Union. Monash disliked the changes, and after several meetings in September 1991, HBO opt not to request for a final review and declined payment. Having worked three days past the deadline and feeling cheated out of $13,000, Jarrico contacted the Writers Guild of America's legal department to arbitrate the dispute. After turning down $5,000 and $7,000, he accepted the third offer of $8,000, along with additional payments into his pension and health plans. Most of Jarrico's scenes were removed from the script.

The actors only received the full script two weeks before shooting began.

=== Character development ===
==== Robert Duvall as Joseph Stalin ====
Duvall was already in Russia with the director during the preparations for Mikhalkov-Konchalovsky's The Inner Circle, and was thus was able to draw on a number of experiences and aspects. He looked at old archive recordings, read several books and spoke to former companions. But he found that in the end, nobody knew about Stalin, and was surprised to discover that "more was known about Hitler than about Stalin". Unable to find anything useful depicting Stalin's character, he had to construct it for himself. He started from scratch and put the figure together based on his own considerations. It was difficult to "intellectualize" Stalin, and Duvall looked for "contradictions in his character" "to extract a few aspects from him". Duvall surmises that to portray the dictator accurately, he had to consider the role from Stalin's point of view, in that he was nothing more than a normal person who "gets up in the morning, puts on his socks and shoes, brushes his teeth, and goes to work". As Stalin did not "see himself as evil," Duvall "couldn't see him as evil either". He imagined Stalin as a Shakespearean character who "saw everywhere only deception, plotting, and perfidy", practicing "in front of a mirror to appear dismissive, stoic or passive". He saw Stalin as a gangster and said it was as if Al Capone had become President of the United States".

Duvall met with several historians, including former general Dmitry Volkogonov, who gave him the key to interpreting Stalin's "blocked conscience". He also spoke to another historian who surmised that Stalin had a deep need for enemies and was only so cruel and terrible because he was obsessed with a latent self-loathing. He also spoke to Stalin's former bodyguard, who showed him how Stalin walked and talked, and learnt that he was a very private and secretive person. Duvall realized that Stalin was a strange and complex man, "a street gangster" with peasant cunning who was also "unpredictable [and] devouring". Duvall commented that Shakespeare would have written about Stalin.

In preparation for his role, Duvall spent four days at Stalin's dacha to get to grips with the character. Since one could neither "play history" nor "play time", he only tried to play Stalin "from moment to moment", without knowing beforehand the final result. Although he noted that he saw an interesting aspect in uncovering history, Duvall indicated that he did not understand Stalin as a person. He did not know his "dark, deep secrets and what propelled him to power", and wondered if he could ever understand him. However, Duvall's performance was described as his "most thoughtful and effective of all roles".

==== Julia Ormond as Nadezhda Alliluyeva ====
British actress Julia Ormond faced the same problem as Duvall. She conducted research, read several books and watched old archive footage to better understand Nadezhda Alliluyeva's character. However, with the exception of Twenty Letters to a Friend written by Nadezhda's daughter Svetlana Alliluyeva, she found nothing useful. She herself liked that in Alliluyeva she had a character with whom she could play an urge for freedom. Therefore, she created her character "as a romantic idealist" who "falls in love with the hero Stalin", gradually discovering Stalin's weaknesses, the mass murders and cruelty spreading throughout the country, and disappointment that he had destroyed their hopes.

However, an elderly Russian lady suggested to Ormond that she play a little more apathetically, since Alliluyeva would also have suffered psychological damage when realising that her ideals were in vain. As a result, Ormond played, according to critics, "perhaps the most tragic victim in history". Her "gentle, innocent, and loving" performance was later praised, as was Duvall's. Buffalo News film critic Alan Pergament slammed the film but praised her acting. He also opined that after Nadezhda's suicide there was no reason to watch the film since Ormond "stole the film".

==== Maximilian Schell as Lenin ====
The role of Lenin was not particularly extensive, as he dies after only 35 minutes into the movie. Maximilian Schell took advantage of the little time he was on screen. Before each scene, he had a tape recorder with him to listen to the recordings with Lenin's voice. He was less concerned with "imitating than with feeling him". This was not easy for Schell, since he felt a certain dislike for Lenin, "because he allowed many people to kill because he believed that power cannot be achieved without Terror could have". Schell tried to convey some contrast in body language. At the beginning of the film, for example, he concentrated on using his right hand vigorously more often. He was so convincing that he was repeatedly praised by film critics, who said that "it is very late to realize" that "Maximilian Schell is behind the mask".

=== Filming ===
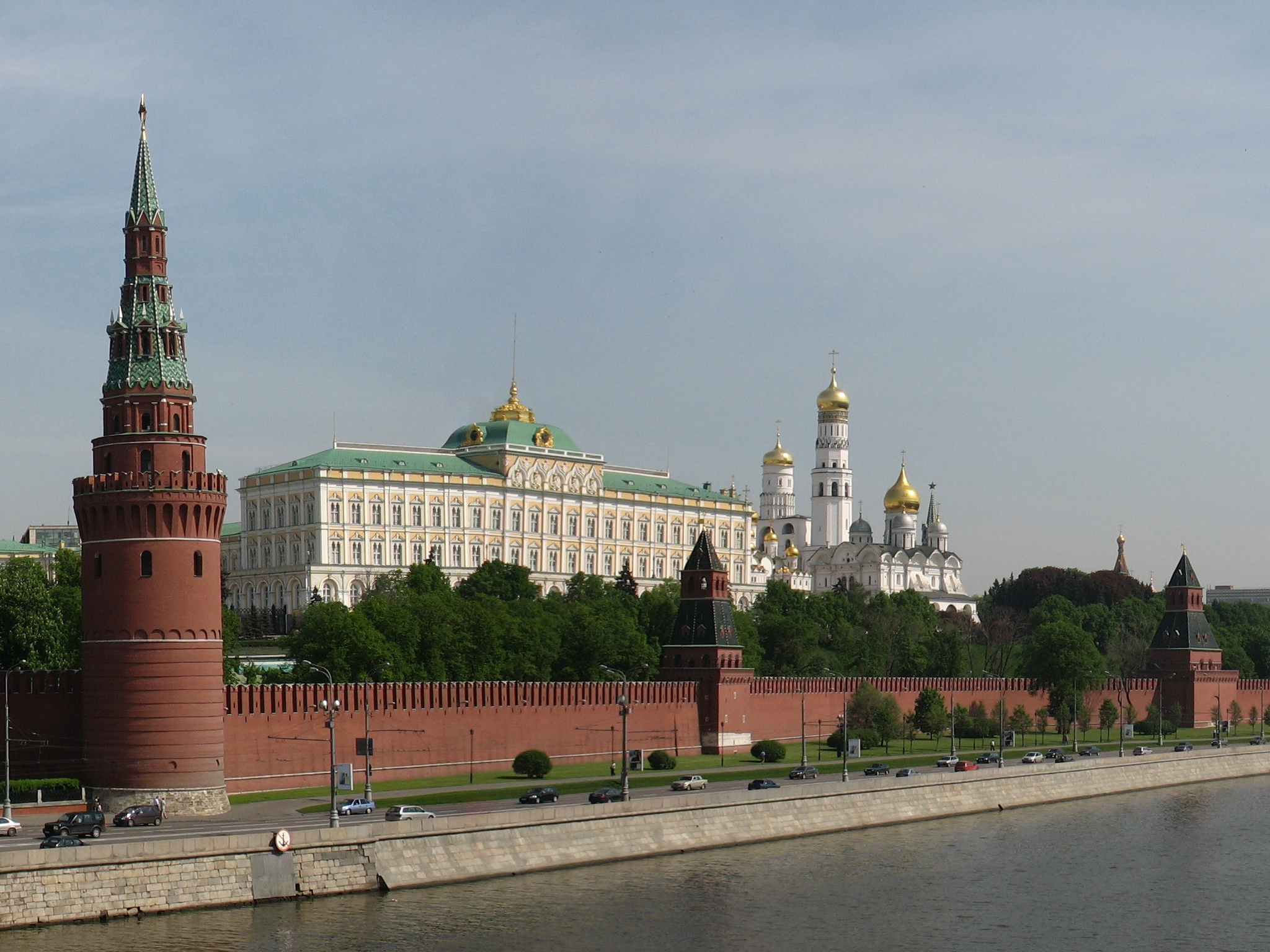
Permission was granted for the first time to shoot a feature film in the Moscow Kremlin

Filming began in October 1991 and was shot exclusively in the Soviet Union at several original locations, including in Stalin's Kuntsevo Dacha, prisons, the Kyiv railway station and for the first time ever, the Kremlin. During the filming in the Russian White House, the film crew worked while Mikhail Gorbachev engaged in government affairs one floor below.

Friends of Carliner, who had filmed in Russia before, warned him about difficult and sometimes unusual challenges. Several minor problems occurred during the estimated seven-week shooting period. Extras went on strike to demand higher pay. Engine drivers were already drunk by 8 a.m., so they couldn't keep their signals. Even simple scenes, like chasing the rabbit in Siberia, had to be interrupted when it was pointed out that they were shooting in a national park where it was forbidden. The head of Lenin's mausoleum at the time, Alexander Schefov, was a conservative hardliner who criticized the production and delayed it. The KGB also showed little cooperation; for example, the film crew, consisting of 25 members and their equipment, had to wait more than seven hours before clearing security to enter the Kremlin. The Kremlin's power supply could not be used for lighting because the KGB felt that this would disrupt the technology of their own equipment, and it took four to five hours to figure out how not to overload the Kremlin's power supply.

There was a power outage at Stalin's dacha just after the final death scene was filmed. Sometimes, a whole day of shooting was lost because extras weren't there. Stalin's victory speech in the Kremlin hall originally involved a meal. The shooting schedule was set at eight in the morning, but the extras were missing because they were still ten kilometers away at the make-up area. After more than eight hours, shuttle buses brought the 500 extras in. But as they were hungry, the extras ignored the director's instructions and ate the whole buffet before the shooting started. Ormond, who was mistakened for a prostitute at the hotel, said they were "starting to think that this couldn't be coincidences and was a deliberate attempt" to sabotage the film.

Duvall, who lived the whole time in Savoy Hotel, had to spend more than four hours a day being "transformed" into Stalin by two make-up specialists. However, the procedure was reduced to around 75 minutes during the course of filming. Overall, the film was shot in nine six-day weeks. On December 21, 1991, four hours after the Soviet Union had dissolved with the signing of the Alma-Ata Protocol, the final scene was shot at Stalin's dacha.

To test the effect of their masks, Schell and Duvall went out among the people in their respective personas as Lenin and Stalin. Schell was often ignored while Duvall experienced rejection and contempt.

== Reception ==
=== Russian premiere ===
Owing to the attempted coup, Boris Yeltsin asked the filmmakers to have the film shown on November 7, 1992, in the cinema of the DOM Cultural Center in Moscow before it was broadcast on US television on November 21, 1992. The date was deliberately chosen as it was the 75th anniversary of the October Revolution. Even before the premiere, isolated scenes were shown on Russian television. Nikolai Pavlov, a member of the opposition leadership committee of the National Salvation Front, strongly criticized the film on the grounds that it "oversimplified everything" and there was nothing left of Stalin except a "dissolute sadist and executioner craving for power". Yeltsin was undeterred and demanded that the film be seen by 1,000 celebrities and senior figures in the Russian government. Like Gorbachev, he himself stayed away from the premiere. However, Vice President Alexander Rutskoy and former Soviet US ambassador Anatoly Dobrynin did appear.

At the beginning of the event, Stalin biographer and historian Dmitri Volkogonov explained the film, noting both the historical context and that the film was merely "an American take on Stalin". The film opened with laughter as viewers watched the opening scene, which allegedly portrayed Stalin in Siberia, with local Muscovites immediately recognising a suburb of Moscow. As the film progressed, and the realization that Stalin's crimes were mostly left out, the audience grumbled, and the film ended with "shallow clapping".

When asked about their opinion of the film, people gave different answers depending on whether they sympathized with Stalin or thought he was a criminal. Russian politicians saw the film as more of a "political thriller that reduces Stalin to a gangster and hangman". Many viewers felt that one should have focused less on Stalin's life and more on his crimes. Rada Adzhubei, daughter of Nikita Khrushchev, found it "good that such films are shown" and saw it "with pleasure". A senior adviser to Ruzkoi opined that the film was seen as "useful for Americans, useless for Russians". Some said the film was a "farce, a fake [...] American propaganda to tear up the country", while others criticized it for romanticizing Stalin. The film was characterized as "artificial and primitive", and a "parody". Overall, it was stated that one could “not make a good film about Stalin or Hitler” because “regardless of what one does in the film”, one could never “do justice to reality”. However, almost everyone were satisfied with Duvall's portrayal and the stunning original locations.

Duvall, who usually speaks with a slight Southern accent, said before the premiere that his interpretation of a Georgian accent would probably cause "a lot of frowns at the premiere". After the premiere, Russian film producers offered Duvall to star in other possible Russian films about Lenin and Trotsky; Duvall declined.

=== American reaction ===
Critics acknowledged the effort put into the film as well as the high production budget. Tom Shales of The Washington Post praised the "impressive aspects" and "powerful scenes" of the film while Lon Grahnke labelled it a "formidable epic". Lee Winfrey of Inquirer TV compliments the film for its "textbook examples of how to do drama".

The film's cinematography was also praised. Vilmos Zsigmond's camera work was singled out for special mention. He matched his color scheme to the characters' feelings about life, initially showing colorful images meant to illustrate the "very happy and optimistic" hopes after the revolution. However, as the film progresses, the color choices diminish, leaving only black and white at the end. This was recognized as "lavish" and "beautifully filmed" and "magnificently staged".

The film was also said to have a "very good" color scheme. This would be primarily due to the exterior shots, which offer the film a "look, fullness, unpredictability" and "sense of authenticity" The film's "unpredictability" is also a factor, along with Syrewicz's turbulent composition, which is at times overwhelming.

Duvall's performance of Stalin was subjected to criticism. Although a variety of different situations, such as singing, dancing and joking were shown, some felt that Duvall remained "invisible under the mask". Opinions differed as to whether Duvall's acting was hampered by the mask because he could only move his eyes or whether, despite the "expressionless face" and his "mysterious and inscrutable" acting, "no one ever portrayed Stalin more convincingly and forcefully than Duvall". The mask in particular seemed to have an impact on the acting, as there were no spontaneous actions and any moment of hilarity can turn into dead silence. Duvall could only do this due to the mask, which created an "illusion of threat". For others however, the illusion was not present; Sun Sentinel's Scott Hettrick suggests that a major problem with the film is that "once you see Robert Duvall, you see Robert Duvall. But when you see Maximilian Schell, you see Lenin and only realize very late that it is Schell”.

The focus on Stalin's personal life has been considered by some to be the film's "greatest strength and at the same time its main weakness". Almost all film critics took up the "lack of historical context" as the greatest point of criticism. While it was not possible to present Stalin's story in a three-hour film, which would require a "long mini-series to capture Stalin in his entirety", a major problem was that the film left the questions it raised unanswered, leaving the viewer unsure of Stalin's true character. John Leonard from the New York Magazine opined that the film was no more than a Forsyte saga, as it seemed more important to show how "Stalin sticks a lighted cigarettes down Nadya's dress and is unkind to his children from both marriages", than to delve into important historical matters.

=== Press reviews ===
Though it's an "ambitious and magnificently expensive project", The New York Times's John J. O'Connor wondered what "could have gone wrong". He put it down to the production process, saying the film was not only "superficial" but also "overly diplomatic" in order to survive in the world market, particularly in Russia. He did, however, commend Duvall, who was "wrapped under acrylic makeup" and "caught in an unrelentingly evil role between The Godfather and Potemkin [...] trying to humanize Stalin".

According to Variety magazine's Tony Scott, Passer's "impressive directing" and Duvall's superb acting, who as a result of the mask had to "convey essences by using shrewd body language", meant the film could fully draw on Stalin's "ruthlessness, his manipulations, [and] his disregard for friendship”, but also claimed that the attempt to understand the Georgian despot through the film failed.

In the Chicago Sun-Times, Lon Grahnke said the film is both a "formidable epic" and a "gloomy and often depressing film that charts a murderer's rise to absolute power". He praised Duvall for struggling to find a "spark of humanity in a cold-blooded creature" and despite his comparable "passive acting" is still "more interesting than his" fellow actors. He also said that in "their dark images, Passer and Zsigmond reflect their Slavic sensibilities and painful memories of their youth in Eastern Europe". He criticized the film for focusing on too many historical facts and exploring the "psychological motives" enough.

Rick Kogan said in the Chicago Tribune that the film failed to depict enough attention to Leon Trotsky and World War II, and therefore couldn't fully present Stalin and the "monster in the man". He also writes that the film's attempt to compress long drawn-out events to create "a more intimate, and therefore more chilling portrait" was "misguided" and only partially successfully. He praised Duvall's "mesmerizing performance" and saw Stalin's wife, Nadezhda Alliluyeva, as "most tragic victim" as she is the only person to whom he is devoted and shows humanity.

"The film is worth watching just for Duvall's acting," Fred Kaplan writes in the Boston Globe, because the rest was just "absolutely stupid" and "trivial". After all, the film has nothing to say other than that Stalin was a monster. He further criticized that the "history is presented almost entirely as a palace intrigue" without going into the background and causes. While praising "Duvall's haunting performance as a Soviet dictator," he also regretted that "the screenplay lacked so much" that Duvall could have alluded to. The film "would only be more tolerable" if it lived up to its own claim of "presenting a compelling anatomy of evil," but even at that it "fails".

David Zurawik wrote in the Baltimore Sun that "HBO had lost its Joseph Stalin somewhere between the script and the screen". The film was "lavishly staged" and had "visually a structure, richness and unpredictability that only exterior shots can offer. But looks aren't everything”. Especially when, in his opinion, only “essential kitchen psychology” was used to characterize Stalin, which depicted his inner life far too simply. He also laments that Duvall was hampered by his mask and could only move his eyes, making his game look absolutely leaden.

In Entertainment Weekly, Michael Sauter opined that Duvall "exhibits a dominant presence as Comrade Stalin" but the human behind it remains hidden "under all the tons of makeup". He also wondered why the "second biggest monster of the century" was so boring.

== Awards and nominations ==
Year	Award	Category	Nominee(s)	Result	Ref.
1993	American Society of Cinematographers Awards	Outstanding Achievement in Cinematography in a Movie of the Week or Pilot	Vilmos Zsigmond	Won	
1993	Golden Globe Awards	Best Miniseries or Motion Picture Made for Television		Nominated	
1993	Golden Globe Awards	Best Actor in a Miniseries or Motion Picture Made for Television	Robert Duvall	Won	
1993	Golden Globe Awards	Best Supporting Actor in a Series, Miniseries or Motion Picture Made for Television	Maximilian Schell	Won	
1993	Golden Globe Awards	Best Supporting Actress in a Series, Miniseries or Motion Picture Made for Television	Joan Plowright	Won	
1993	Primetime Emmy Awards	Outstanding Made for Television Movie	Mark Carliner, Donald L. West, and Ilene Kahn Power	Won (Note: Tied with Barbarians at the Gate.)	
1993	Primetime Emmy Awards	Outstanding Lead Actor in a Miniseries or a Special	Robert Duvall	Nominated	
1993	Primetime Emmy Awards	Outstanding Supporting Actor in a Miniseries or a Special	Maximilian Schell	Nominated	
1993	Primetime Emmy Awards	Outstanding Supporting Actress in a Miniseries or a Special	Joan Plowright	Nominated	
1993	Primetime Emmy Awards	Outstanding Individual Achievement in Writing for a Miniseries or a Special	Paul Monash	Nominated	
1993	Primetime Emmy Awards	Outstanding Individual Achievement in Art Direction for a Miniseries or a Special	Keith Wilson, Vladimir Murzin, Alistair Kay, Vladimir Bashkin, Peter Drozd, Eugene Kamaev, Vladimir Rybin, Yuri Shuyer, Valery Tsvetkov, and Alexander Kazmischev	Won	
1993	Primetime Emmy Awards	Outstanding Individual Achievement in Cinematography for a Miniseries or a Special	Vilmos Zsigmond	Won	
1993	Primetime Emmy Awards	Outstanding Individual Achievement in Makeup for a Miniseries or a Special	Stephan Dupuis, Charles Carter, Karchi Magyar, Nina Kolodkina, Katalin Elek, and Dennis Pawlik	Nominated	
1993	Primetime Emmy Awards	Outstanding Individual Achievement in Sound Editing for a Miniseries or a Special	G. Michael Graham, Mark Friedgen, Tim Terusa, Philip A. Hess, Billy B. Bell, Greg Schorer, David C. Eichhorn, Rusty Tinsley, Charles R. Beith Jr., Scott Eilers, Gary Shinkle, Richard Steele, Mark Steele, Bob Costanza, Dan Luna, Michael J. Wright, Gary Macheel, J. Michael Hooser, A. David Marshall, Kristi Johns, and Peter Davies	Nominated	
1993	Primetime Emmy Awards	Outstanding Sound Mixing for a Drama Miniseries or a Special	Drew Kunin, Grover B. Helsley, Robert W. Glass Jr., Richard D. Rogers, Michael Jiron, Tim Philben, and Scott Millan	Won	
1994	CableACE Awards	Movie or Miniseries	Mark Carliner, Donald L. West, Ilene Kahn Power, Ivan Passer, and Paul Monash	Nominated	
1994	CableACE Awards	Supporting Actor in a Movie or Miniseries	Maximilian Schell	Won	
1994	CableACE Awards	Directing for a Movie or Miniseries	Ivan Passer	Nominated	
1994	CableACE Awards	Art Direction in a Dramatic Special or Series/Theatrical Special/Movie or Miniseries	Keith Wilson	Nominated	
1994	CableACE Awards	Costume Design	Marit Allen	Nominated	
1994	CableACE Awards	Direction of Photography and/or Lighting Direction in a Dramatic or Theatrical Special/Movie or Miniseries	Vilmos Zsigmond	Won	
1994	CableACE Awards	Original Score	Stanislas Syrewicz	Won	

== See also ==
- List of Primetime Emmy Awards received by HBO
