= Robert Duvall =

American actor and filmmaker (1931–2026)

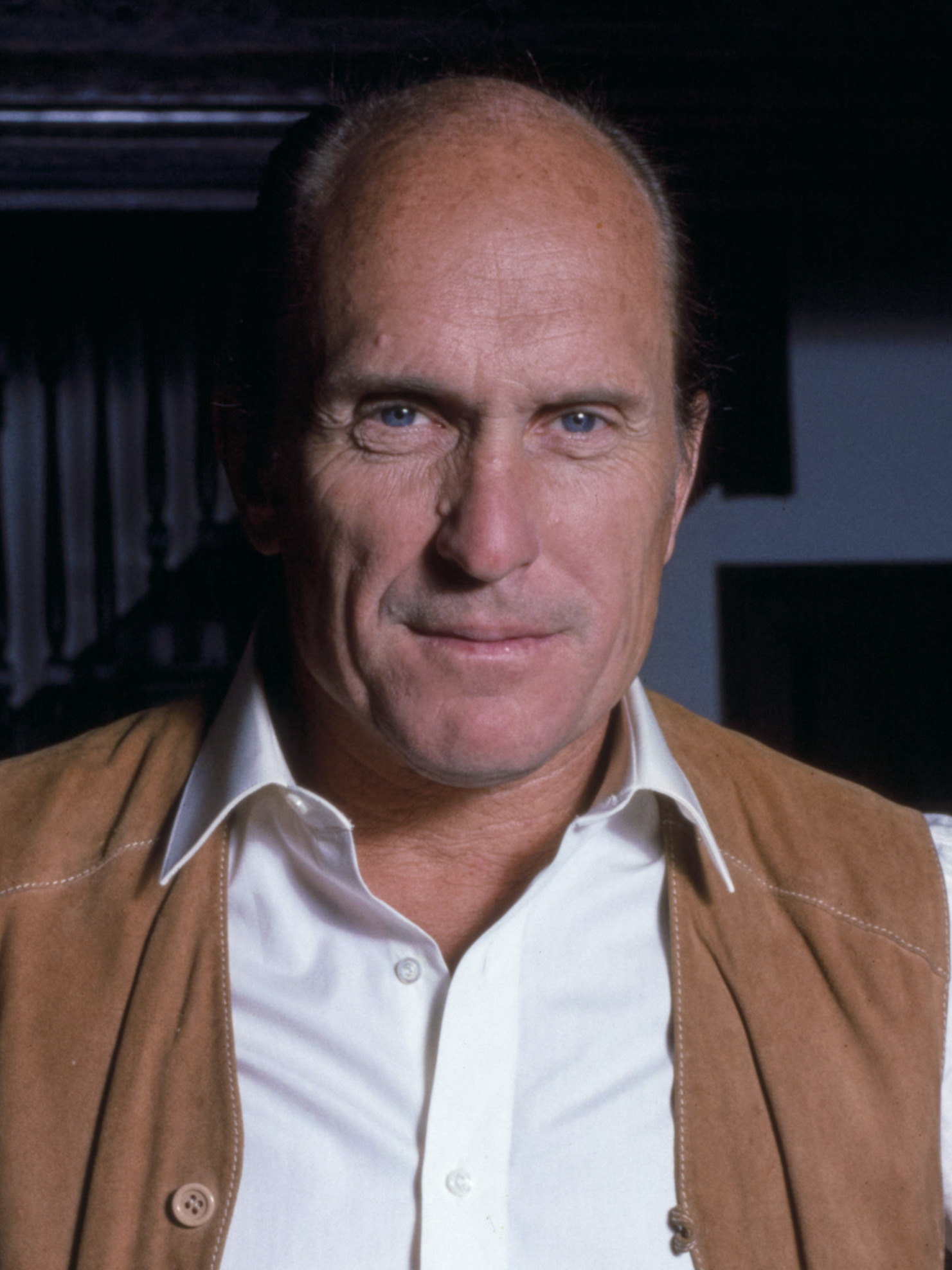
- Duvall in 1984
- Born: Robert Selden Duvall; January 5, 1931; San Diego, California, U.S.
- Died: February 15, 2026 (aged 95); Middleburg, Virginia, U.S.
- Education: Principia College (BA); Neighborhood Playhouse School of the Theatre
- Occupations: Actor; director; producer
- Years active: 1952–2022
- Works: Full list
- Spouses: Barbara Benjamin (m. 1964; div. 1975) Gail Youngs (m. 1982; div. 1986) Sharon Brophy (m. 1991; div. 1995) Luciana Pedraza (m. 2005)
- Awards: Full list
- Military service
- Allegiance: United States
- Branch: United States Army
- Service years: 1953–1954
- Rank: Private first class
- Awards: National Defense Service Medal

Robert Selden Duvall (/duːˈvɔːl/; January 5, 1931 – February 15, 2026) was an American actor and filmmaker, best known for his roles in films of the later 20th century. Duvall began acting professionally on stage in 1952, performing in summer plays at the Gateway Playhouse in Bellport on Long Island until 1959, with a one-year break while serving in the U.S. Army. In his early theater career, he made contacts that then led to a career on television in the 1960s on shows such as The Defenders, Playhouse 90, and Armstrong Circle Theatre. He made his Broadway debut in the play Wait Until Dark in 1966, and, in 1977, he returned from screen acting to the stage in David Mamet's play American Buffalo, earning a Drama Desk Award for Outstanding Actor in a Play nomination.

Duvall made his feature film acting debut in a brief but memorable turn as Boo Radley in To Kill a Mockingbird (1962). His other early roles included Bullitt (1968), True Grit (1969), M*A*S*H (1970), THX 1138 (1971), and Tomorrow (1972), the last of which was developed at the Actors Studio and was his personal favorite. Duvall won the Academy Award for Best Actor for his performance as an alcoholic former country music star in Tender Mercies (1983). His other Oscar-nominated roles included The Godfather (1972), Apocalypse Now (1979), The Great Santini (1979), The Apostle (1997), A Civil Action (1998), and The Judge (2014). Throughout his career, Duvall also starred in numerous television productions. He won the Primetime Emmy Award for Outstanding Limited Series and Outstanding Lead Actor in a Limited Series for the AMC limited series Broken Trail (2006). His other Emmy-nominated roles included the CBS miniseries Lonesome Dove (1989), the HBO film Stalin (1992), and the TNT film The Man Who Captured Eichmann (1996).

With a career spanning seven decades, Duvall received an Academy Award, a BAFTA Award, four Golden Globe Awards, two Primetime Emmy Awards, and a Screen Actors Guild Award. He was critically acclaimed for his technical proficiency and chameleon-like ability to assume a convincing role. Vincent Canby dubbed him "the American Olivier" in 1980 and this label stuck.

== Early life, family and education ==
Robert Selden Duvall was born January 5, 1931, in San Diego, California, to Mildred Virginia Duvall (née Hart), an amateur actress, and Rear Admiral William Howard Duvall of the United States Navy. The second of three sons, he grew up alongside an older brother, William Jr., and a younger brother, John, who later became an entertainment lawyer. His father was from Virginia and descended from early Maryland settler Mareen Duvall.

Duvall was raised in the Christian Science religion, though he later noted that he did not attend church. He spent much of his childhood in Annapolis, Maryland, where his father was stationed at the United States Naval Academy. He attended Severn School in Severna Park, Maryland, and The Principia in St. Louis, Missouri, before graduating with a Bachelor of Arts degree in drama from Principia College in Elsah, Illinois, in 1953.

His father had expected him to attend the US Naval Academy, but Duvall recalled, "I was terrible at everything but acting—I could barely get through school". He instead served in the United States Army after the Korean War, from August 19, 1953, to August 20, 1954, leaving as private first class. "That's led to some confusion in the press", he explained in 1984, "Some stories have me shooting it out with the Commies from a foxhole over in Frozen Chosin. Pork Chop Hill stuff. Hell, I barely qualified with the M-1 rifle in basic training". While stationed at Camp Gordon in Georgia, he appeared in an amateur production of the comedy Room Service in nearby Augusta.

In the winter of 1955, Duvall attended the Neighborhood Playhouse School of the Theatre in New York City, studying under Sanford Meisner on the G.I. Bill. His classmates included Gene Hackman and James Caan. While training, he worked as a Manhattan post office clerk. Until his death, he remained close friends with fellow California-born actors Dustin Hoffman and Hackman (who died in 2025), whom he had known since their years as struggling actors. In 1955, Duvall roomed with Hoffman in a New York City apartment while they studied together at the Playhouse, and around the same time also shared accommodation with Hackman while working odd jobs such as clerking at Macy's, sorting mail, and driving a truck.

== Career ==
=== Early career: 1952–1969 ===
==== Theater ====
Duvall began his professional acting career with the Gateway Playhouse, an Equity summer theater based in Bellport, Long Island, New York. His stage debut was in its 1952 season, when he played the Pilot in Laughter in the Stars, an adaptation of The Little Prince, at what was then the Gateway Theatre.

After a year away while serving in the U.S. Army (1953–1954), he returned to Gateway for its 1955 summer season, appearing as Eddie Davis in Ronald Alexander's Time Out for Ginger (July 1955), Hal Carter in William Inge's Picnic (July 1955), Charles Wilder in John Willard's The Cat and the Canary (August 1955), Parris in Arthur Miller's The Crucible (August 1955), and John the Witchboy in William Berney and Howard Richardson's Dark of the Moon (September 1955). The playbill for Dark of the Moon noted that he had portrayed the Witchboy previously and would "repeat his famous portrayal" for the 1955 revival.

During Gateway's 1956 season, his third with the company, Duvall played Max Halliday in Frederick Knott's Dial M for Murder (July 1956), Virgil Blessing in Inge's Bus Stop (August 1956), and Clive Mortimer in John Van Druten's I Am a Camera (August 1956). Playbills that year described him as "an audience favorite" in the last season and as having "appeared at the Neighborhood Playhouse in New York and studied acting with Sandy Meisner this past winter".

In its 1957 season, Duvall appeared as Mr. Mayher in Agatha Christie's Witness for the Prosecution (July 1957), as Hector in Jean Anouilh's Thieves' Carnivall (July 1957), and the role which he once described as the "catalyst of his career": Eddie Carbone in Arthur Miller's A View from the Bridge, from July 30 to August 3, 1957, directed by Ulu Grosbard, who was by then a regular director at the Gateway Theatre. Miller himself attended one of Duvall's performances as Eddie, and, during that performance run, Duvall met important people, which allowed him, in two months, to land a "spectacular lead" in the Naked City television series.

While appearing at the Gateway Theatre in the second half of the 1950s, Duvall was also appearing at the Augusta Civic Theatre, the McLean Theatre in Virginia, and the Arena Stage in Washington, D.C. The 1957 playbills also described him as "a graduate of the Neighborhood Playhouse" (indicating that he had completed his studies there by the summer of 1957), "a member of Sanford Meisner's professional workshop", and as having worked with Alvin Epstein, a mime and a member of Marcel Marceau's company. By July 1957, his theatrical credits included performances as Jimmy in The Rainmaker and as Harvey Weems in Horton Foote's The Midnight Caller.

Already receiving top-billing at the Gateway Playhouse, in the 1959 season, he appeared in lead roles as Stanley Kowalski in Tennessee Williams's A Streetcar Named Desire (July–August 1959), Maxwell Archer in Once More with Feeling, Igor Romanoff in Peter Ustinov's Romanoff and Juliet, and Joe Mancuso in Kyle Crichton's The Happiest Millionaire (all in August 1959).

At the Neighborhood Playhouse, Meisner cast him in Tennessee Williams's Camino Real and the title role of Harvey Weems in Foote's one-act play The Midnight Caller. The latter was already part of Duvall's performance credits by mid-July 1957.

Duvall made his off-Broadway debut at the Gate Theater as Frank Gardner in George Bernard Shaw's Mrs. Warren's Profession on June 25, 1958. This play closed three days later (June 28) after five performances. His other early off-Broadway credits include the role of Doug in the premiere of Michael Shurtleff's Call Me by My Rightful Name on January 31, 1961, at One Sheridan Square and the role of Bob Smith in the premiere of William Snyder's The Days and Nights of BeeBee Fenstermaker on September 17, 1962, then, until June 9, 1963, at the Sheridan Square Playhouse.

His most notable off-Broadway performance, for which he won an Obie Award in 1965 and which he considered his "Othello", was as Eddie Carbone, again, in Miller's A View from the Bridge at the Sheridan Square Playhouse from January 28, 1965, to December 11, 1966. It was directed again by Ulu Grosbard with Dustin Hoffman. On February 2, 1966, he made his Broadway debut as Harry Roat Jr in Frederick Knott's Wait Until Dark at the Ethel Barrymore Theatre. This played at the Shubert Theatre and George Abbott Theatre and closed on December 31, 1966, at the Music Box Theatre. His other Broadway performance was as Walter Cole in David Mamet's American Buffalo, which opened at the Ethel Barrymore Theatre on February 16, 1977, and closed at the Belasco Theatre on June 11, 1977.

==== Television ====
In 1959, Duvall made his first television appearance on Armstrong Circle Theater in the episode "The Jailbreak". He appeared regularly on television as a guest actor during the 1960s, often in action, suspense, detective, or crime dramas. His appearances during this time include performances on Alfred Hitchcock Presents, Naked City, The Untouchables, Route 66, The Twilight Zone, Combat!, The Outer Limits, The Fugitive, T.H.E. Cat, Voyage to the Bottom of the Sea, The Time Tunnel, The Wild Wild West, The F.B.I., and The Mod Squad.

==== Film ====
Duvall's film acting debut was in a brief but memorable turn as Boo Radley in the critically acclaimed To Kill a Mockingbird (1962). He was cast in the film on the recommendation of screenwriter Horton Foote, who met Duvall at the Neighborhood Playhouse during a 1957 production of Foote's play, The Midnight Caller. Foote, who collaborated with Duvall many more times over the course of their careers, said he believed Duvall had a particular love of common people and ability to infuse fascinating revelations into his roles. Foote described Duvall as "our number one actor".

After To Kill a Mockingbird, Duvall appeared in several films during the 1960s, mostly in midsized parts, but also in a few larger supporting roles. Some of his more notable appearances include the role of Captain Paul Cabot Winston in Captain Newman, M.D. (1963), Chiz in Countdown (1967), and Gordon in The Rain People. Duvall had a small part as a cab driver who ferries Steve McQueen around just before the chase scene in the film Bullitt (1968). He was the notorious malefactor "Lucky" Ned Pepper in True Grit (1969), in which he engaged in a climactic shootout with John Wayne's Rooster Cogburn on horseback.

=== Mid-career: 1970–1989 ===
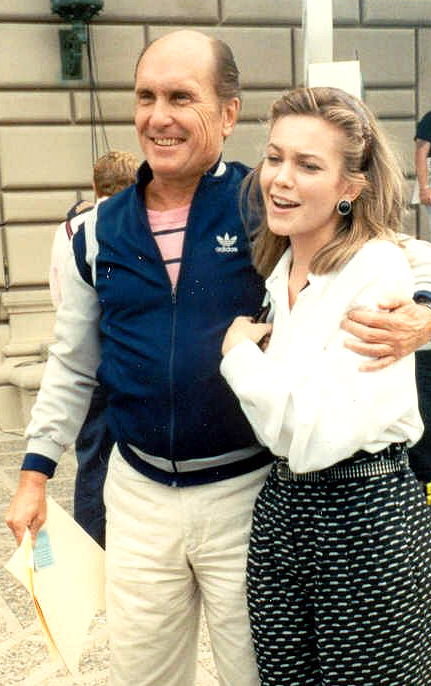
Duvall with Diane Lane at the 41st Emmy Awards, September 1989

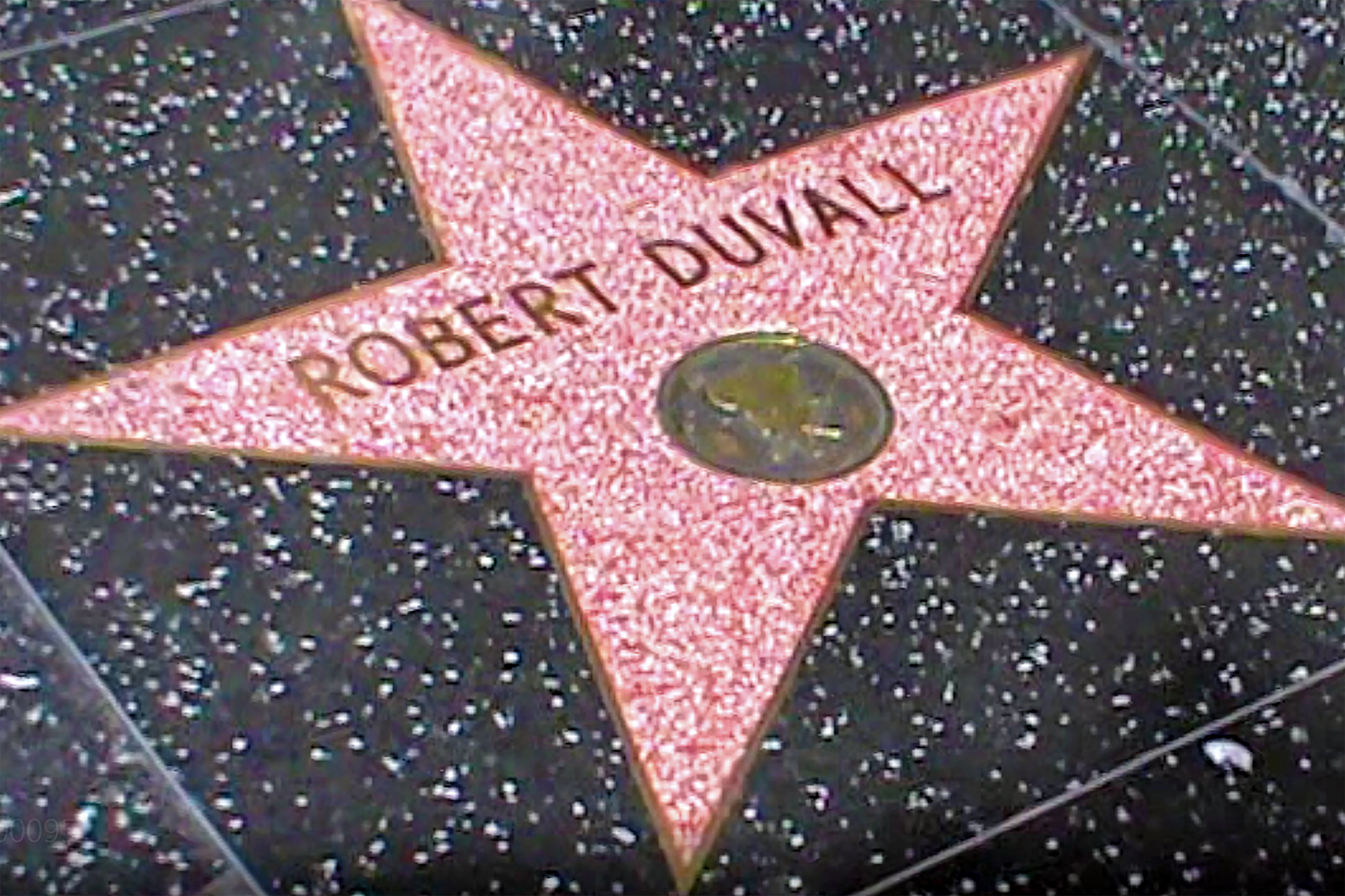
Duvall's star on the Hollywood Walk of Fame

Duvall became an important presence in American films beginning in the 1970s. He drew a considerable amount of attention in 1970 for his portrayal of the malevolent Major Frank Burns in the film M*A*S*H and for his portrayal of the title role in THX 1138 in 1971 where he plays a fugitive trying to escape a society controlled by robots. His first major critical success came portraying Tom Hagen in The Godfather (1972) and The Godfather Part II (1974), the 1972 film earning him an Academy Award nomination for Best Supporting Actor. Also in 1974, Duvall played a corporate director (uncredited) in Francis Ford Coppola's thriller The Conversation. In 1976, Duvall played supporting roles in The Eagle Has Landed and as Dr. Watson in The Seven-Per-Cent Solution with Nicol Williamson, Alan Arkin, Vanessa Redgrave, and Laurence Olivier.

By the mid-1970s Duvall was a top character actor; People described him as "Hollywood's No. 1 No. 2 lead". Duvall received another Oscar nomination for Best Supporting Actor and won both a BAFTA Award and Golden Globe Award for his role as Lieutenant Colonel Kilgore in Apocalypse Now (1979). His line "I love the smell of napalm in the morning" from Apocalypse Now is regarded as iconic in cinema history. The full text is:

You smell that? Do you smell that? Napalm, son. Nothing else in the world smells like that. I love the smell of napalm in the morning. You know, one time we had a hill bombed, for twelve hours. When it was all over I walked up. We didn't find one of 'em, not one stinkin' dink body. But the smell! You know – that gasoline smell... the whole hill! Smelled like... victory. (Pause) Some day this war is going to end...

Duvall received a BAFTA Award nomination for his portrayal of television executive Frank Hackett in the critically acclaimed film Network (1976) and garnered an Oscar nomination for Best Actor in a Leading Role in The Great Santini (1979) as the hard-boiled Marine Lieutenant Colonel "Bull" Meechum. The latter role was based on a Marine aviator, Colonel Donald Conroy, the father of the book's author Pat Conroy. He also co-starred with Laurence Olivier and Tommy Lee Jones in The Betsy (1978) and portrayed United States President Dwight D. Eisenhower in the television miniseries Ike (1979).

Coppola praised Duvall as "one of the four or five best actors in the world". Wanting top billing in films, in 1977 Duvall returned to Broadway to appear as Walter Cole in David Mamet's American Buffalo, stating "I hope this will get me better film roles". He received a Drama Desk Award nomination for Outstanding Actor in a Play.

You can't concoct or push ahead something other than what you have at that moment as yourself, as that character. It's you at that moment in time. ... Between action and cut, it's a nice world, but you can't force that any more than you can force it in life.

— Robert Duvall on acting

Duvall continued appearing in films during the 1980s, including the roles of a detective in True Confessions (1981), the disillusioned sportswriter Max Mercy in The Natural (1984), and Los Angeles police officer Bob Hodges in Colors (1988). He won an Oscar for Best Actor as country western singer Mac Sledge in Tender Mercies (1983). Duvall did his own singing, insisting it be added to his contract that he sings the songs himself. Duvall said, "What's the point if you're not going to do your own [singing]? They're just going to dub somebody else? I mean, there's no point to that."

Actress Tess Harper, who co-starred, said Duvall inhabited the character so fully that she only got to know Mac Sledge and not Duvall himself. Director Bruce Beresford, too, said the transformation was so believable to him that he could feel his skin crawling up the back of his neck the first day of filming with Duvall. Beresford said of the actor, "Duvall has the ability to completely inhabit the person he's acting. He totally and utterly becomes that person to a degree which is uncanny." Duvall and Beresford did not get along well during the production and often clashed during filming, including one day in which Beresford walked off the set in frustration.

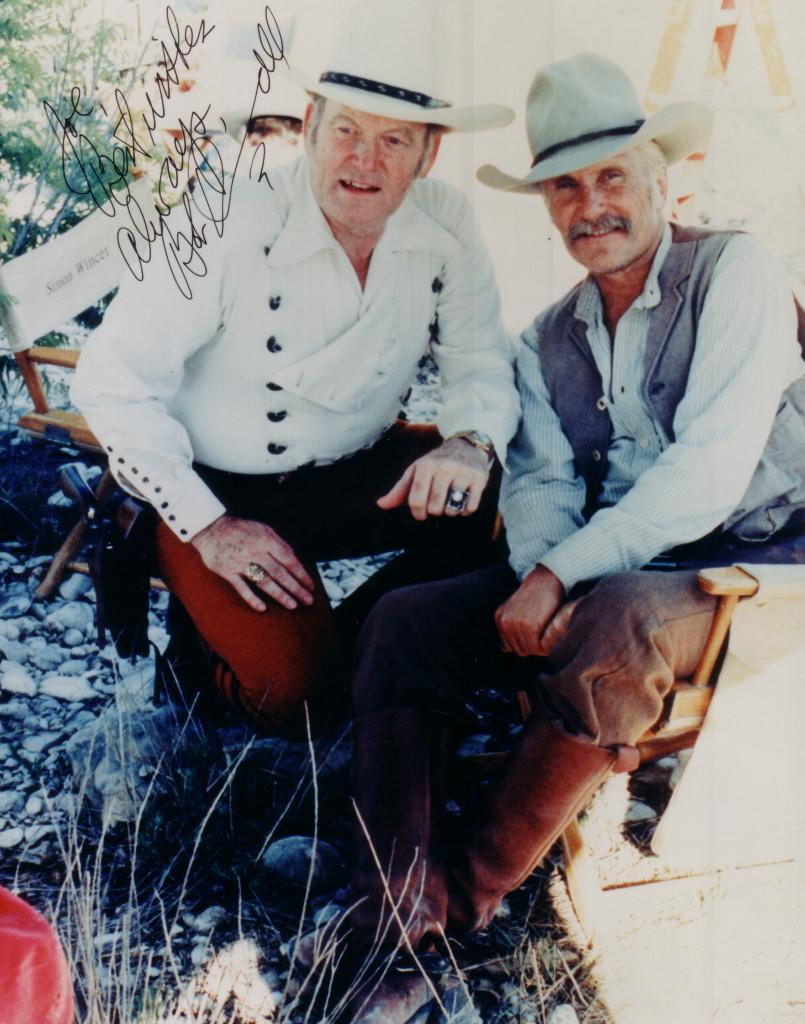
Joe Bowman with Duvall on the set of Lonesome Dove

In 1989, Duvall appeared in the miniseries Lonesome Dove in the role of Captain Augustus "Gus" McCrae, Texas Rangers (retired). He considered this role to be his personal favorite. He won a Golden Globe Award and earned an Emmy Award nomination. For his role as a former Texas Ranger peace officer, Duvall was trained in the use of Walker revolvers by the Texas marksman Joe Bowman.

=== Later career and final roles: 1990–2022 ===
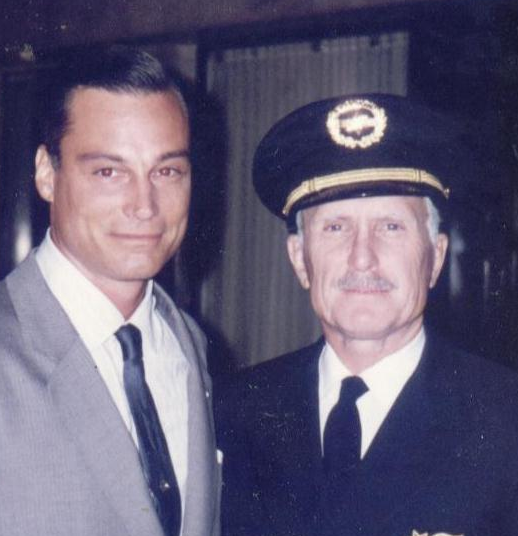
Duvall (right) on the set of The Man Who Captured Eichmann, 1996

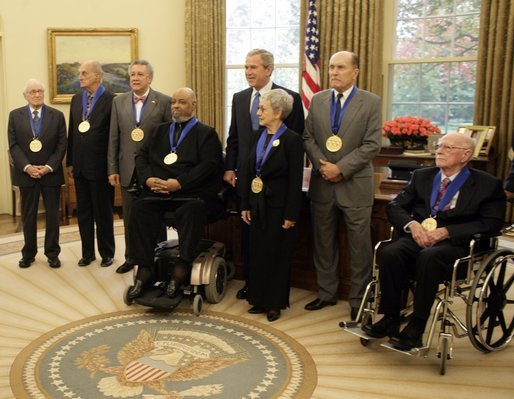
President George W. Bush stands with recipients of the 2005 National Medal of Arts, from left: Leonard Garment, Louis Auchincloss, Paquito D'Rivera, James DePreist, Tina Ramirez, Robert Duvall, and Ollie Johnston

For The Godfather Part III (1990), Duvall declined to reprise the role of Tom Hagen unless he received a salary comparable to Al Pacino's, a condition that wasn't met. In 2004, he told 60 Minutes, "if they paid Pacino twice what they paid me, that's fine, but not three or four times, which is what they did." In 1992, he founded the production company Butcher's Run Films. Duvall maintained a busy film schedule throughout the 1990s, sometimes appearing in as many as four films in a single year. He received Academy Award nominations for his portrayals of evangelical preacher Euliss "Sonny" Dewey in The Apostle (1997)—which he also wrote and directed—and of attorney Jerome Facher in A Civil Action (1998).

He directed Assassination Tango (2002), a thriller inspired by his long‑standing interest in tango, and portrayed General Robert E. Lee in Gods and Generals (2003).

Other roles during this period demonstrated his wide range, including a crew chief in Days of Thunder (1990), the patriarch of an upper-class Southern family in Rambling Rose (1991), newspaper publisher Joseph Pulitzer in the Disney musical Newsies (1992), a retiring cop in Falling Down (1993), a Hispanic barber in Wrestling Ernest Hemingway (1993), a New York tabloid editor in The Paper (1994), a rural doctor in Phenomenon (1996), a horse-farm owner in Something to Talk About (1995), an abusive father in Sling Blade (1996), and an astronaut in Deep Impact (1998).

He continued to work steadily into the 2000s, appearing as a mechanic in Gone in 60 Seconds (2000), a soccer coach in A Shot at Glory (2000), a scientist in The 6th Day (2000), a police officer in John Q. (2002), a trail boss in Open Range (2003), an eccentric adventurer in Secondhand Lions (2003), another soccer coach in the comedy Kicking & Screaming (2005), a Las Vegas poker champion in Lucky You (2007), a New York City police chief in We Own the Night (2007), the patriarch of a dysfunctional family in Four Christmases (2008), a man staging his own funeral in Get Low (2010), an eccentric golf champion mentoring a troubled young pro in Seven Days in Utopia (2011), and a retired U.S. Marine Corps gunnery sergeant who owns a shooting range in Jack Reacher (2012).

He has a star on the St. Louis Walk of Fame.

Duvall continued to work in television from the 1990s onward. He won a Golden Globe Award and received an Emmy nomination for his portrayal of Soviet Premier Joseph Stalin in the 1992 television film Stalin. He earned another Emmy nomination in 1997 for portraying Adolf Eichmann in The Man Who Captured Eichmann. In 2006, he won an Emmy for his performance as Prentice "Print" Ritter in the AMC revisionist Western miniseries Broken Trail.

In 2005, Duvall was awarded a National Medal of Arts by President George W. Bush at the White House. In 2014, he starred in The Judge alongside Robert Downey Jr. While the movie itself received mixed reviews, Duvall's performance was praised. He was nominated for a Golden Globe, Screen Actors Guild, and Academy Award for his supporting role, becoming in 2015, at age 84, the oldest actor ever nominated for the Academy Award for Best Supporting Actor for his role in the film, a record that has since been surpassed by Christopher Plummer.

In 2018, Duvall appeared in the Steve McQueen-directed heist thriller Widows as a corrupt power broker. The film earned critical acclaim. In 2022, he appeared in the Netflix films Hustle and The Pale Blue Eye, which would be his final roles.

== Personal life and death ==
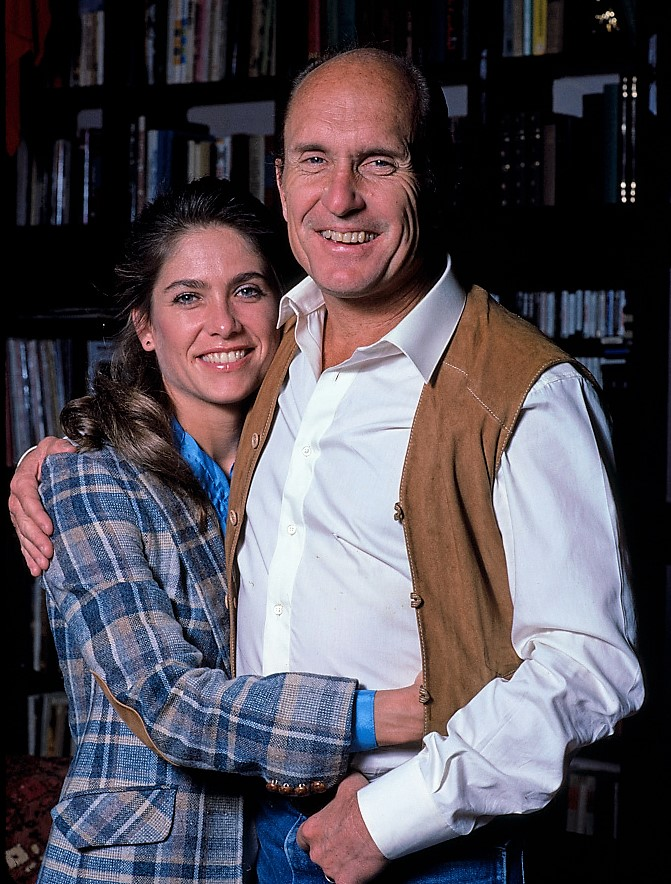
Duvall with wife Gail Youngs, New York City apartment, 1984

=== Relationships ===
Duvall was married four times and did not have any children. "I guess I'm shooting blanks", he said in 2007. He added, "[I've tried] with a lot of different women, in and out of marriage." He met his first wife, Barbara Benjamin, a former announcer and dancer on The Jackie Gleason Show, during the filming of To Kill a Mockingbird (1962). She had also appeared in Guys and Dolls (1955) and The Courtship of Eddie's Father (1963) under the name Barbara Brent. Benjamin had two daughters from a previous marriage, and she and Duvall were married from 1964 until 1975.

His second marriage was to Gail Youngs, to whom he was married from 1982 to 1986. Through Youngs, he was briefly the brother‑in‑law of John Savage, Robin Young, and Jim Youngs.

Duvall's third marriage was to Sharon Brophy, a dancer, from 1991 to 1995.

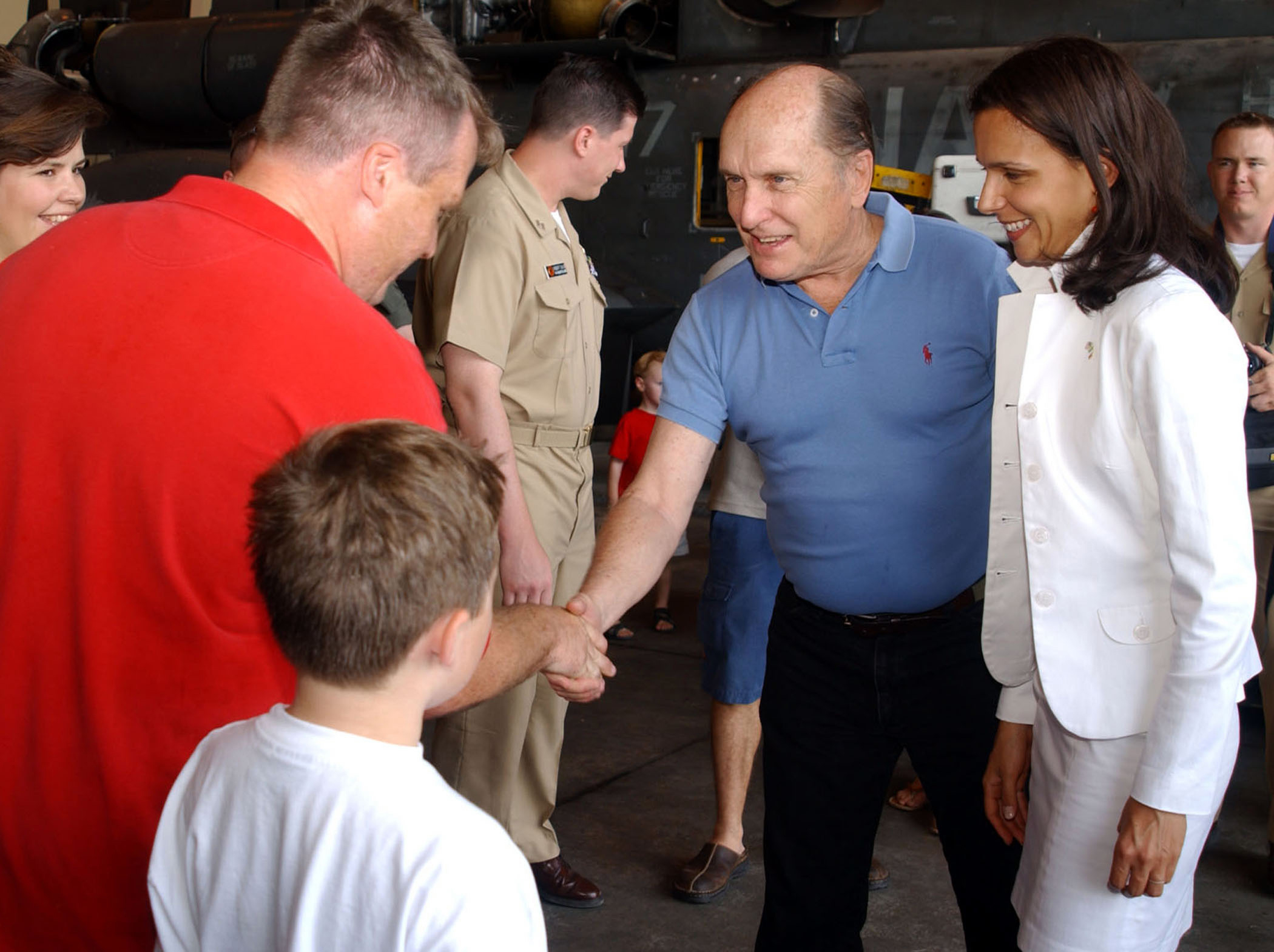
Duvall, with Luciana Pedraza (right), shaking hands with a member of "The Black Stallions" of Helicopter Combat Support Squadron FOUR at the Taormina Film Fest in Sicily, Italy, 2003

In 2005, Duvall married his fourth wife, Luciana Pedraza, granddaughter of Argentine aviation pioneer Susana Ferrari Billinghurst. He met Pedraza in Argentina, recalling, "The flower shop was closed, so I went to the bakery. If the flower shop had been open, I never would've met her." Both were born on January 5, though Duvall was 41 years older. They had been together since 1997. He produced, directed, and acted with her in Assassination Tango (2002), much of which was filmed in Buenos Aires. Duvall was known as a skilled Argentine tango dancer and maintained tango studios in both Argentina and the United States.

He also trained in Brazilian jiu-jitsu and practiced martial arts with his wife.

=== Political views ===
Duvall's political views were variously described as libertarian or conservative. He was personally invited to Republican President George W. Bush's inauguration in 2001. In September 2007, he announced his support for Rudy Giuliani's campaign in the 2008 Republican Party presidential primaries. Duvall worked the floor at the GOP's 2008 national convention.

In September 2008, he appeared onstage at a John McCain–Sarah Palin rally in New Mexico, and he endorsed Republican presidential nominee Mitt Romney in 2012. In 2014, Duvall said in an interview that he was considering becoming an independent due to his dissatisfaction with the Republican Party, which he called "a mess".

=== Philanthropy and activism ===
In 2001, Pedraza and Duvall founded the Robert Duvall Children's Fund to assist families in northern Argentina through the renovation of homes, schools, and medical facilities. They were also active supporters of Pro Mujer, a nonprofit organization dedicated to helping some of Latin America's poorest women, with their efforts focused on Pedraza's home region in the Argentine Northwest.

In May 2009, Duvall spoke for historic preservation against Walmart's proposal to build a store across the road from the entrance to the Wilderness Battlefield national park in Orange County, Virginia. In 2011, he appeared at the Texas Children's Cancer Center charity event, "An Evening with a Texas Legend", in Houston, where he was interviewed by television journalist Bob Schieffer.

In February 2023, Duvall addressed a council meeting in suburban Virginia to oppose a proposed Amazon facility, which was later cancelled.

=== Death ===
Duvall died at his farm in Middleburg, Virginia, on February 15, 2026, at the age of 95. His death was announced through a public statement by his wife Luciana Pedraza.

== Acting credits and accolades ==
Vincent Canby, the chief film critic of the New York Times, called him "the American Olivier", comparing him with the great English actor Laurence Olivier, and this label stuck.

Now it's about time to recognize Robert Duvall as one of the most resourceful, most technically proficient, most remarkable actors in America today. When I say "one of..." I don't mean to weasel out of anything. At this moment, having just seen Mr. Duvall in "The Great Santini," I think he may well be the best we have, the American Olivier.

Al Pacino, who starred alongside Duvall in The Godfather and The Godfather Part II, said that "It was an honor to have worked with Robert Duvall. He was a born actor, as they say; his connection with it, his understanding and his phenomenal gift will always be remembered. I will miss him."

Scott Cooper, who directed Duvall in several films, shared with The Guardian that "Robert Duvall's legacy is secure. He is one of the greatest actors who ever lived. His work will endure as long as cinema itself endures."

Duvall received numerous accolades for his acting including an Academy Award for Best Actor for his role as an alcoholic former country music star in the drama Tender Mercies (1983). He also received a British Academy Film Award, two Primetime Emmy Awards, four Golden Globe Awards, and a Screen Actors Guild Award.

Over his distinguished career he was recognized by the Academy of Motion Picture Arts and Sciences for the following performances:

- 45th Academy Awards: Best Actor in a Supporting Role, nomination, The Godfather (1972)
- 52nd Academy Awards: Best Actor in a Supporting Role, nomination, Apocalypse Now (1979)
- 53rd Academy Awards: Best Actor in a Leading Role, nomination, The Great Santini (1981)
- 56th Academy Awards: Best Actor in a Leading Role, win, Tender Mercies (1983)
- 70th Academy Awards: Best Actor in a Leading Role, nomination, The Apostle (1997)
- 71st Academy Awards: Best Actor in a Supporting Role, nomination, A Civil Action (1998)
- 87th Academy Awards: Best Actor in a Supporting Role, nomination, The Judge (2014)

== See also ==
- List of actors who have appeared in multiple Palme d'Or winners
