= Webb Ellis (sportswear) =

Rugby apparel and equipment

Webb Ellis Ltd.
- Company type: Private
- Industry: Sports equipment
- Founded: 2003; 23 years ago
- Founder: Rod and Lawrence Webb
- Headquarters: London, England
- Area served: Worldwide
- Key people: Lawrence Webb, CEO
- Products: Sportswear, rugby union balls, netballs, accessories
- Website: webbellisrugby.co.uk

Webb Ellis Limited is a British manufacturing company based in London. The company, focused on rugby union and netball, manufactures a wide range of sports equipment, including sportswear, rugby union balls, protective gear, and accessories.

In the last years, Webb Ellis expanded its direction entering to the market of school uniforms.

== History ==
The company was founded in January 2003 by Rod and Lawrence Webb, as a manufacturer of products for the practise of rugby union that included team uniforms, boots and balls.

The first important contract for Webb Ellis came the same year of its foundation, when the company signed a deal with European Professional Club Rugby to supply official balls for the European Champions Cup (then "Heineken Cup"). Three years later, the Welsh Rugby Union chose the Webb Ellis balls for its national team home internationals. During the following years, Webb Ellis expanded its business area adding distributors in Ireland, France, USA, Canada, Argentina, Uruguay, Italy, Spain, South Africa, Japan, Australia and New Zealand.

== Sponsorships ==
Clubs and associations that have/had deals with Webb Ellis include:

=== Current ===
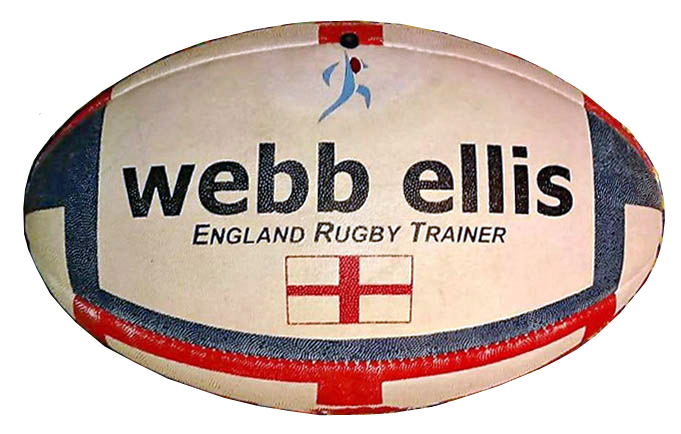
Rugby union ball by Webb Ellis

- (Argentina) Banco Hipotecario
- (Argentina) Los Cedros
- (Argentina) Centro Naval
- (Argentina) Círculo Universitario
- (Argentina) Marista
- (Argentina) San Carlos
- (Argentina) Sociedad Hebraica
- (Argentina) SITAS
- (Argentina) Los Tilos
- (Argentina) Sociedad Hebraica
- (England) Wallingford RFC

=== Former ===
==== Clubs ====
- (Argentina) CASA de Padua
- (Argentina) Los Cedros
- (Argentina) DAOM
- (Argentina) Delta
- (Argentina) La Salle
- (Argentina) Lanús RC
- (Argentina) Liceo Militar
- (Argentina) Liceo RC (Mendoza)
- (Argentina) Lomas Athletic
- (Argentina) Los Tilos
- (Argentina) Mariano Moreno
- (Argentina) San Lorenzo
- (Argentina) Tigre RC
- (Colombia) Bogotá Athletic Club
- (England) South Leicester
- (United States) Brooklyn
- (United States) New York
- (United States) Michigan RU

==== Unions ====
- (Argentina) Buenos Aires RU - referees kits
- (Argentina) Córdoba RU
- (Argentina) Rosario RU
- (Argentina) Tucumán RU
- (Wales) Welsh Rugby Union - ball supplier
