= Billinghurst =

Billinghurst or Billingshurst may refer to:

== Places ==
- Billinghurst, Argentina, a town in the General San Martín Partido of Buenos Aires Province, Argentina
- Billingshurst, a village and civil parish in the Horsham District of West Sussex, England

== People ==
- Benson Dillon Billinghurst (1869–1935), American educator
- Charles Billinghurst (1818–1865), American politician
- Guillermo Billinghurst (1851–1915), Peruvian president
- Mariano Billinghurst (1810–1892), Argentine businessman and politician
- Manuela Billinghurst (1919–1967), Peruvian politician
- Mark Billinghurst (fl. 2000s–2020s), New Zealand-born Australian professor of computer interface technologies
- Rosa May Billinghurst (1875–1953), English suffragette and women's rights activist
- Susana Ferrari Billinghurst (1914–1999), Argentine aviator

== Other ==
- Billinghurst Requa Battery, rapid-fire gun used during the American Civil War
- Billingshurst (electoral division)
- Billingshurst F.C.
