= Liceo Militar =

Liceo Militar may refer to:

- Liceo Militar General Artigas, a secondary school in Uruguay
- CEC Liceo Militar, an Argentine rugby union and field hockey club
