= Luján Rugby Club =

Argentine rugby club

(Argentina) Luján
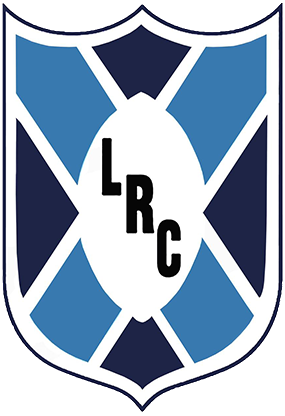
- Full name: Luján Rugby Club
- Union: URBA
- Founded: 8 July 1972; 54 years ago
- Location: Luján, Argentina
- Ground: Luján
- Chairman: Héctor Mendoza
- League: URBA Primera C
- 2025: ?
Team kit

Luján Rugby Club is an Argentine rugby union and field hockey club based in the city of Luján, Buenos Aires Province. The rugby team currently plays in Primera C, the 4th. division of the Unión de Rugby de Buenos Aires league system.

== History ==
Luján Rugby Club was founded on July 8, 1972, by a group of students of the "Colegio Marista", a traditional school of Luján, being Rubén Alvarez its first president. The team trained at the school field, and the matches were played in a land which the Municipality of Luján allowed the club to use for a term of 30 years.

The first team coach was Ernesto Miranda, a former player of Club San Martín. In 1973 women's hockey team is formed, with notable players as Nelba Bouvier, Rosita Freire and Carmen Acuña, amongst others. In 1974 the rugby team affiliated to Unión Argentina de Rugby, and one year later the hockey team registered to Asociación Argentina de Hockey.

In 2010, Fabián Ubellart, a 42-year-old veteran player of the club, died while training with the team. It was diagnosed the cause was sudden cardiac death.

Women's field hockey team promoted to Primera D (the fourth division) in 2008, after the Hockey Federation reconsidered the situation of the team, which had been obtained the championship that year. Despite being the champion, Luján had had to play the playoffs, where the team had been eliminated. According to the rules, the club did not promote to the upper division but the Federation allowed the club to play at the fourth division in 2009. In 2011, Luján was Primera A champion, after defeating Los Cedros 1-0 at Los Matreros field.
