= Ángel Gillard =

Argentine footballer

Personal information
- Full name: Ángel Nahuel Gillard
- Date of birth: 21 January 2002 (age 24)
- Place of birth: Barrio Libertador, Argentina
- Height: 1.76 m (5 ft 9 in)
- Position: Forward

Team information
- Current team: Corvinul Hunedoara
- Number: 32

Youth career
- Deportivo Libertador
- San Lorenzi
- –2020: Chacarita Juniors
- 2020–2021: Fernández Vial

Senior career*
Years	Team	Apps	(Gls)
2020	Central Ballester		
2020–2024	Fernández Vial	59	(17)
2025–2026	Deportes Concepción	44	(9)
2026–	Corvinul Hunedoara	15	(1)
- * Club domestic league appearances and goals as of 7 November 2026

Ángel Nahuel Gillard (born 21 January 2002) is an Argentine footballer who plays as a forward for Liga I club Corvinul Hunedoara.

== Club career ==
Born in Barrio Libertador, Buenos Aires, Argentina, Gillard was with Deportivo Libertador, San Lorenzi and Chacarita Juniors before joining Central Ballester, with whom he made his senior debut.

In 2020, Gillard moved to Chile thanks to Walter Montillo as agent and signed with Fernández Vial, winning the 2020 Segunda División Profesional de Chile.

In January 2025, Gillard signed with Deportes Concepción. They got promotion to the Chilean Primera División and Gillard continued with them for the 2026 season.

Ended his contract with Deportes Concepción, Gillard moved to Europe and signed with Romanian club Corvinul Hunedoara on 19 June 2026.

== Honours ==
Fernández Vial

- Segunda División Profesional de Chile: 2020

== Personal life ==
Gillard is a Chacarita Juniors supporter.
