= Martín Scelzo =

Argentine rugby union player (born 1976)

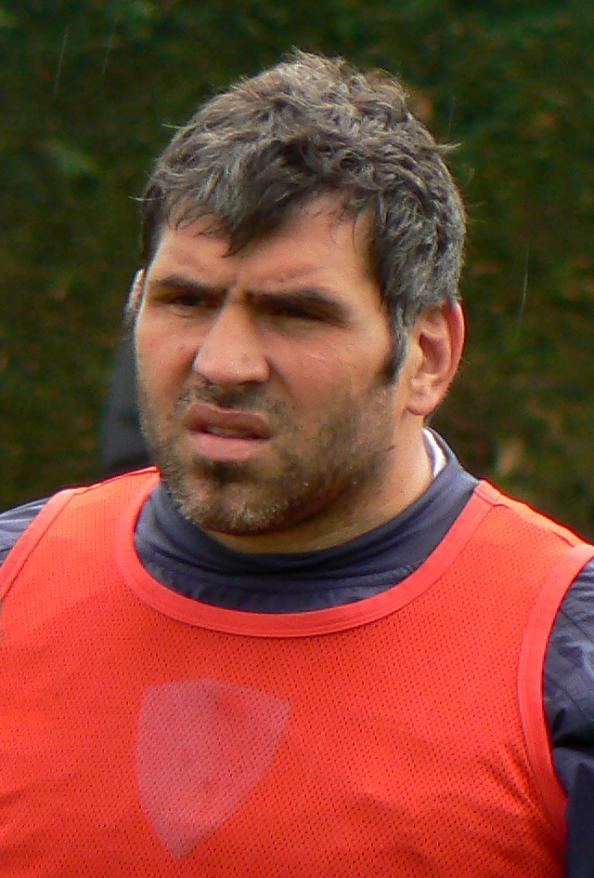
- Born: Martín Alejandro Scelzo; February 5, 1976 (age 50) Buenos Aires, Argentina
- Height: 1.90 m (6 ft 3 in)
- Weight: 126 kg (19 st 12 lb)
- Notable relative: Juan Martín Scelzo (son)

Rugby union career
- Position: Prop
Youth career
- Banco Hipotecario
Senior career
Years	Team	Apps	(Points)
1994–1999	Hindú		
1999–2001	Northampton	23	(0)
2001–2004	Narbonne	36	(15)
2004–2011	Clermont	119	(45)
2011–2012	Agen	13	(0)
International career
Years	Team	Apps	(Points)
1996–2011	Argentina	59	(50)
- Correct as of 9 December 2011

Martín Alejandro Scelzo (born 5 February 1976 in Buenos Aires) is an Argentine rugby union footballer, currently playing for ASM Clermont Auvergne in the Top 14. He usually plays as a prop. He has also represented Argentina, including at the 1999, 2003, 2007 and 2011 Rugby World Cups.

He made his debut for Argentina in September 1996 in a match against the United States. He also played in one other match that season, against South Africa. He played four matches the following season, playing in games against Romania, Italy, France and Australia. After playing in a number of Tests in 1998 he was included in Argentina's 1999 Rugby World Cup squad.

He played three internationals in June 2000. He next played for Argentina in June 2003, and was soon included in their 2003 Rugby World Cup squad. After the World Cup he next played internationals for the Pumas in November 2005, and then played a number of Tests in June 2006.

He won the 1999-00 Heineken Cup while a player at the Northampton Saints, playing as a replacement in the final.

Scelzo played in the final as Clermont won the Top 14 title in 2009–10.

After the elimination of Argentina by the All Blacks in the 2011 Rugby World Cup, Scelzo announced his retirement from Los Pumas on 10 October 2011.

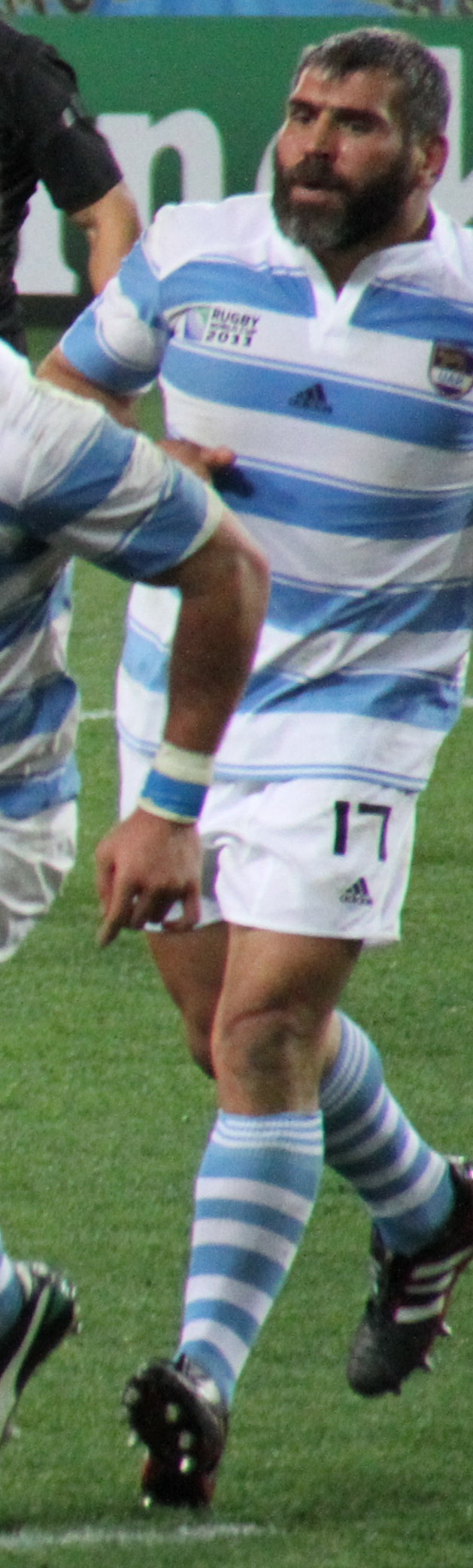
Scelzo during 2011 RWC
