= Assassination Tango =

- Theatrical release poster
- Directed by: Robert Duvall
- Screenplay by: Robert Duvall
- Produced by: Rob Carliner; Robert Duvall
- Starring: Robert Duvall; Rubén Blades; Kathy Baker; Luciana Pedraza
- Cinematography: Félix Monti
- Edited by: Stephen Mack
- Music by: Luis Enríquez Bacalov
- Production companies: United Artists; American Zoetrope
- Distributed by: MGM Distribution Co.
- Release dates: September 11, 2002 (Toronto International Film Festival); March 28, 2003
- Running time: 114 minutes
- Country: United States
- Languages: English; Spanish
- Box office: $1 million

Assassination Tango is a 2002 American crime thriller film written, produced, directed by, and starring Robert Duvall. Other actors include Rubén Blades, Kathy Baker and Duvall's Argentine wife, Luciana Pedraza. Francis Ford Coppola was one of the executive producers.

The film centers on the life of a hitman who travels to Argentina for a job, as well as his discovery of Argentine tango and his relationship with a woman living there. The film is considered a "labour of love" of Duvall, a self-confessed tango addict. Most of the film was shot in Buenos Aires, and some scenes at the beginning and end of the story were filmed in Coney Island, Brooklyn.

== Plot ==
Anderson (Duvall) is a successful American hitman whose employer sends him to do a job in Buenos Aires, Argentina. His contacts inform him that his target is a former general who took part in Argentina's last military dictatorship. Following a phone call with one of the co-conspirators, Anderson learns that his job is delayed due to his target sustaining an injury in a riding accident. Angry and frustrated that he is stuck in Argentina until the target is recovered from his accident, he walks the street and hears music behind a red curtain. He finds that behind the curtain is a beautiful woman gracefully dancing the tango with a man. He is immediately entranced by the dancing and wants to learn more about it, which leads to his meeting with Manuela, a local tango dancer and instructor, and the woman he first saw behind the red curtain.

Things are not as easy as they seem. Although Anderson has immersed himself in the world of Manuela and dancing tango, he continues to prepare for and plan to assassinate the general. A paranoid Anderson simultaneously rents a room in two different hotels. From the safety but close proximity of one hotel room, he witnesses police converge on the other hotel. Anderson will fulfill his obligation to do the job despite the obvious reality that there is a leak. Although Anderson initially plans on shooting the general from the rooftops, he ends up pretending to deliver flowers while the general is in his backyard and shoots him point-blank in the heart. The police investigate, bringing in the prostitute Anderson slept with, but she has no information on him.

Meanwhile, Anderson desperately tries to get a hold of his co-conspirators so that he can leave Argentina. Unknown to Anderson, his Argentinian co-conspirator Miguel (Rubén Blades) has been arrested by the police. Miguel is harshly interrogated, but can breathe a sigh of relief when his conspirator within the Argentinian federal authorities shows up.

Anderson, thinking that he has been abandoned and is stuck in Argentina, and will be found out for the general's murder, hides out in his room until he realizes that the joy he had with the tango was fleeting. He suddenly remembers that he left the special boots he bought for his daughter, in the other rental room and risks his life to retrieve them. He decides to try to go back home before he gets killed in Argentina. Meanwhile, Manuela goes about her life with what appears to be her toddler daughter.

Although Anderson is almost stopped at the airport, he eventually makes it out of Argentina safely. On the airplane back to the U.S., Anderson dreams about dancing the tango with Manuela. He makes it home to his family, showing them a few steps of the tango he learned, but right before he goes in the house he scans the area—just in case.

== Cast ==
- Robert Duvall as John J. Anderson
- Luciana Pedraza as Manuela
- Kathy Baker as Maggie
- Rubén Blades as Miguel
- Katherine Micheaux Miller as Jenny
- Julio Oscar Mechoso as Orlando
- James Keane as Whitey
- Frank Gio as Frankie
- Frank Cassavetes as Jo Jo
- Michael Corrente as the policeman
- Raúl Outeda as Tony Manas
- Géraldine Rojas as Pirucha
- Elbio Nessier as General Humberto Rojas
- Marzenka Novak as Orlando's aunt

== Reception ==
The film received a mixed reception. On the review aggregator website Rotten Tomatoes, 48% of 88 critics' reviews are positive, with an average rating of 5.6/10. The website's consensus reads: "Slow to start, this quirky film eventually overstays its welcome." Metacritic, which uses a weighted average, assigned the film a score of 51 out of 100, based on 30 critics, indicating "mixed or average" reviews.

Many critics criticized its slow pace and saw the film as nothing but personal self-indulgence from Duvall. Mick LaSalle of the San Francisco Chronicle called the film "vanity project" and said that it's "hard to see what Duvall thinks is so interesting about the hit man, aside from the fact that he's playing him". Michael Luongo of Frommer's stated that the film was slow-paced, but "highlights his [Duvall's] obsession with Argentina and the tango, letting the city [Buenos Aires] serve as the backdrop". Roger Ebert awarded the film three stars out four and although he said that the film is "not quite successful", he considered it a "fascinating effort". However, he said that Assassination Tango is "not entirely about crime or dance, and that will be a problem for some audiences, although the little girl skipping in the playground scene really steals the show". Amy K. Kaminsky said that the film was "utterly personal", in that the "violence of the junta seems to be overshadowed by individual desire". She stated that the film masked "U.S. involvement in setting up dictatorships, teaching torture techniques, and underwriting state violence".
