= Elida Carlés =

Argentine female pilot (1912–1970)

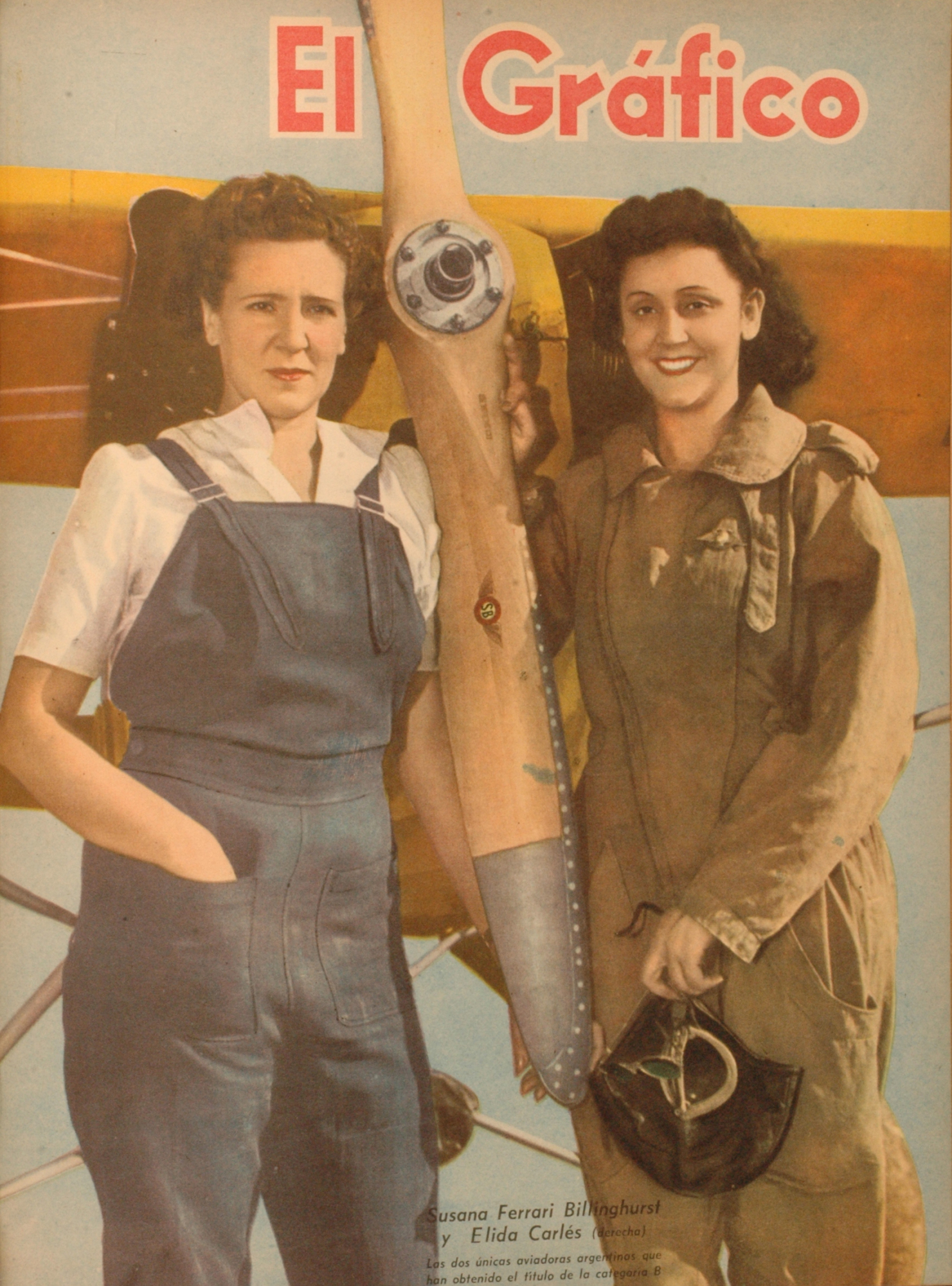
- Elida Carlés (right) with Susana Ferrari Billinghurst, magazine cover, 29 January 1943
- Born: 1 July 1912; Buenos Aires
- Died: 21 February 1970 (aged 57); Buenos Aires
- Education: Escuela de Arte Dramático; Instituto Grafotécnico
- Known for: Female pioneer of Argentine aviation
- Aviation career
- Famous flights: Buenos Aires to Montevideo (9 November 1943)
- Flight license: 1941

Elida Carlés (1 July 1912 - 21 February 1970) was an Argentine aviator, actress, broadcaster and journalist.

She is regarded as one of the pioneers of civil aviation in Argentina. At the age of 28, she received her category B commercial pilot's licence. On 9 November 1942, she flew from Buenos Aires to Montevideo, in heavy rain, along with two other Argentine female aviators, Susana Ferrari Billinghurst and Julia Pérez Cattoni. The pilots were representing the Argentine government in a high profile official friendship visit.

== Life and career ==
Elida Carlés was born in Buenos Aires on 1 July 1912. She studied at the School of Dramatic Arts (Escuela de Arte Dramático) and the Graphic Arts Institute (Instituto Grafotécnico).

In 1943, piloting a Focke Wulf biplane, manufactured in Córdoba, she flew to eighteen Argentine cities.

A photograph in Santa Fe's El Litoral newspaper, dated 5 September 1944, shows Carlés and a group of dignitaries, as she flew from Santa Fé aero club in an aircraft promoting Club de la Amistad. This was a popular radio show, broadcast on weekday evenings on Radio Splendid, targeted at younger women. Radio Splendid was part of the Rades network of radio stations which carried Club de la Amistad. The programme organised an aviation tour of the Argentine cities covered by this syndication. The Argentine actor Juan José Piñeiro is also in the photograph. Piñeiro, and the twin sisters Silvia Legrand and Mirtha Legrand were regular contributors to the programme. According to academic Christine Ehrick, the reason for highlighting Carlés' role as pilot was to project a 'modern girl' image to the mostly female listeners of Club de la Amistad.

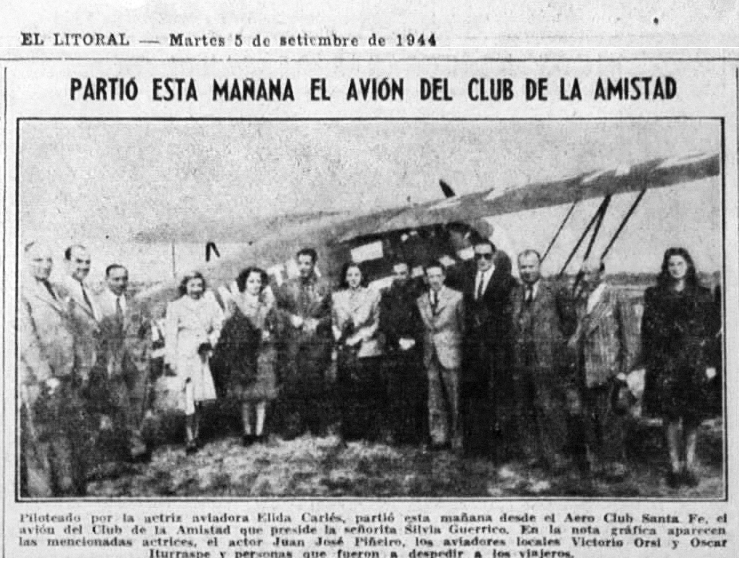
Club de la Amistad aircraft left this morning

Radio programmes and their presenters were covered in the popular press, including magazines such as El Gráfico, Sintonía and its weekly supplement Ondania, dedicated to popular culture and radio schedule listings. Carlés featured in these publications on a number of occasions, including as the cover page photograph, or for attending show business events, and she wrote some articles.

During the Second World War she attempted to contact General Charles de Gaulle, then leading the Free French forces in London. She offered to fly a large twin engine aircraft from Canada to London to assist the Free French. This offer was not taken up. Her flying history was sporadic, and the Second World War inhibited her opportunities. In 1946 Carlés joined up with her radio broadcasting colleague Silvia Guerrico, who had been part of Club de la Amistad, in Mexico, with Guerrico escaping the cultural clampdown that followed Juan Perón's election as president in February 1946.

In the 1950s she was the editor and joint owner of Buenos Aires a la vista, a monthly publication with a circulation of 20,000 copies, that was published with Spanish, English, French and Portuguese language sections. The magazine was used by the newly established Aerolíneas Argentinas as their inflight magazine. She worked at the radio station El Mundo, and later as a producer at Channel 7 television station.

She died in Buenos Aires on 21 February 1970. She was 57 years old.
