= Villa Lynch =

- Locality
- Location in Greater Buenos Aires
- Coordinates: 34°35′42″S 58°31′27″W
- Country: Argentina
- Province: Buenos Aires
- Partido: General San Martín
- Founded: 1856
- Elevation: 28 m (92 ft)

Population (2001 census [INDEC])
  - Total: 3,987
- CPA Base: B 1672
- Area code: +54 11

Villa Lynch is a locality in Greater Buenos Aires, Argentina. It belongs to the General San Martín Partido in the Province of Buenos Aires.

== Parishes of the Catholic Church in Villa Lynch ==
Catholic Church
Diocese	San Martín
Parish	Santísimo Calvario y Nuestra Señora del Líbano
Maronite Eparch	San Charbel in Buenos Aires
Parish	Santísimo Calvario y Nuestra Señora del Líbano (birritual and bidiocesana parish)
