= Pedro Opeka =

Argentine missionary

The Reverend Padre Pedro Opeka CM
- Pedro Opeka with children in Akamasoa
- Born: 29 June 1948 (age 78); San Martín, Buenos Aires, Argentina
- Occupation: Priest
- Website: http://www.perepedro-akamasoa.net/

Pedro Pablo Opeka (born June 29, 1948), known also as Father Opeka, is a Catholic Argentinian-Slovenian priest, working as a missionary in Madagascar. For his service to the poor, he was awarded with the Legion of Honor by the former Slovenian Prime Minister Janez Janša and French President Emmanuel Macron.

== Early life ==
Opeka was born in Argentina, in San Martín, a suburb of Buenos Aires, to Slovenian parents who immigrated there after war. His father was from Begunje pri Cerknici, his mother from Velike Lašče in Lower Carniola;. His father was a former member of the Home Guard, a Slovenian anti-communist Nazi-led auxiliary police force, and avoided post-war summary executions by fleeing to Italy. He met his future Slovenian wife in a refugee camp in Italy, where they married.

Pedro grew up in the streets of Buenos Aires. Very early as a child, from the age of 9, he worked with his father as a bricklayer. At 15, he hesitated between becoming a football professional and a priest. He eventually decided to become a priest and enter the seminary of the Lazarists in Buenos Aires. At 20, he went to Ljubljana in Slovenia (then part of Yugoslavia), to further his training. Two years later, In 1970, he went to Madagascar where he worked as a bricklayer in the parishes of the Lazarists.

He finished his studies at the Catholic Institute of Paris (1972-1975), where he learnt French. He met the Taizé Community near Cluny in France, who have their members supporting communities in 24 major cities around the globe, and travelled all over Europe.

Pedro Opeka speaks 7 languages: Slovenian, Spanish, English, French, Italian, Latin and Malagasy.

== Mission in Madagascar ==
and was nominated to head a rural parish in southeast Madagascar, Vangaindrano.

In 1989, his Lazarist superiors nominated him director of a seminary in Antananarivo, the capital. When he saw a dump from the hills of the city, he discovered people rummaging among garbage to find something to eat, and sleeping in huts made of hemp propped between mountains of waste. Pedro Opeka began talking to them, to convince them that they could leave that misery and abuse, for their children. With the team of young people from Vangaindrano he had trained, and after long discussions, he wrote the articles and statutes of Akamasoa ('good friends' in the local language) in December 1989.

Father Pedro simply had no money and felt sorry for the local people of Madagascar, so he started raising money, started it all with €900 he borrowed from various Slovenian Christian missions.

He later build the entire city and village called Slovenian village with the donations and financial contributions of Slovenian people, raised in Slovenian churches.

Father Pedro in the rubbish dump.

=== Creation of Akamasoa ===
Father Pedro Opeka created a local non-governmental organization called Akamasoa (the good and faithful friends) in December 1989 to continue his work with the Malagasy people. He appointed a team of staff to help him to manage the daily activities and to provide continuous support to poor people.

Today Akamasoa sustains about thirty thousand people in 18 villages, among them ten thousand children, who all go to school, following the building of 37 new schools in the years since Akamasoa's founding.

About four thousand families live in the 18 villages, but another 900,000 Malagasy people have been supported from one day to three weeks in the 'welcome centers', being offered rice, a roof, some clothing and a small package, in order to be 'born again' to life.

Son of a father who taught him building arts, Father Pedro Opeka taught the Akamasoa youth how to build houses, first out of wood, and then, bricks and mortar.

Over 3,000 solid houses have been built by Akamasoa to date for people who used to live in card-board boxes on the ground...Every year, Akamasoa builds new schools, clinics, and training and production centres. Over 3,600 jobs have been created for the villagers, who are paid by Akamasoa every month.

A comprehensive economic structure, Akamasoa has grown to being 75% self-sufficient in revenue, thanks to the creation of stone and gravel quarries, to the craft and embroidery workshops, and to a compost centre next to the 'Tana' public rubbish.

Father Pedro Opeka taught the Akamasoa people tips on how to divide and sort the rubbish, to transport the compost created from rubbish, and to create small agricultural farms. Akamasoa also trains construction artisans (bricklayers, carpenters, cabinet makers, operators and street pavers) who have built or rebuilt roads and bridges to help communities in the villages and all over the country...

Akamasoa lies about 12 km from the center of Antananarivo, on the road to Tamatave.

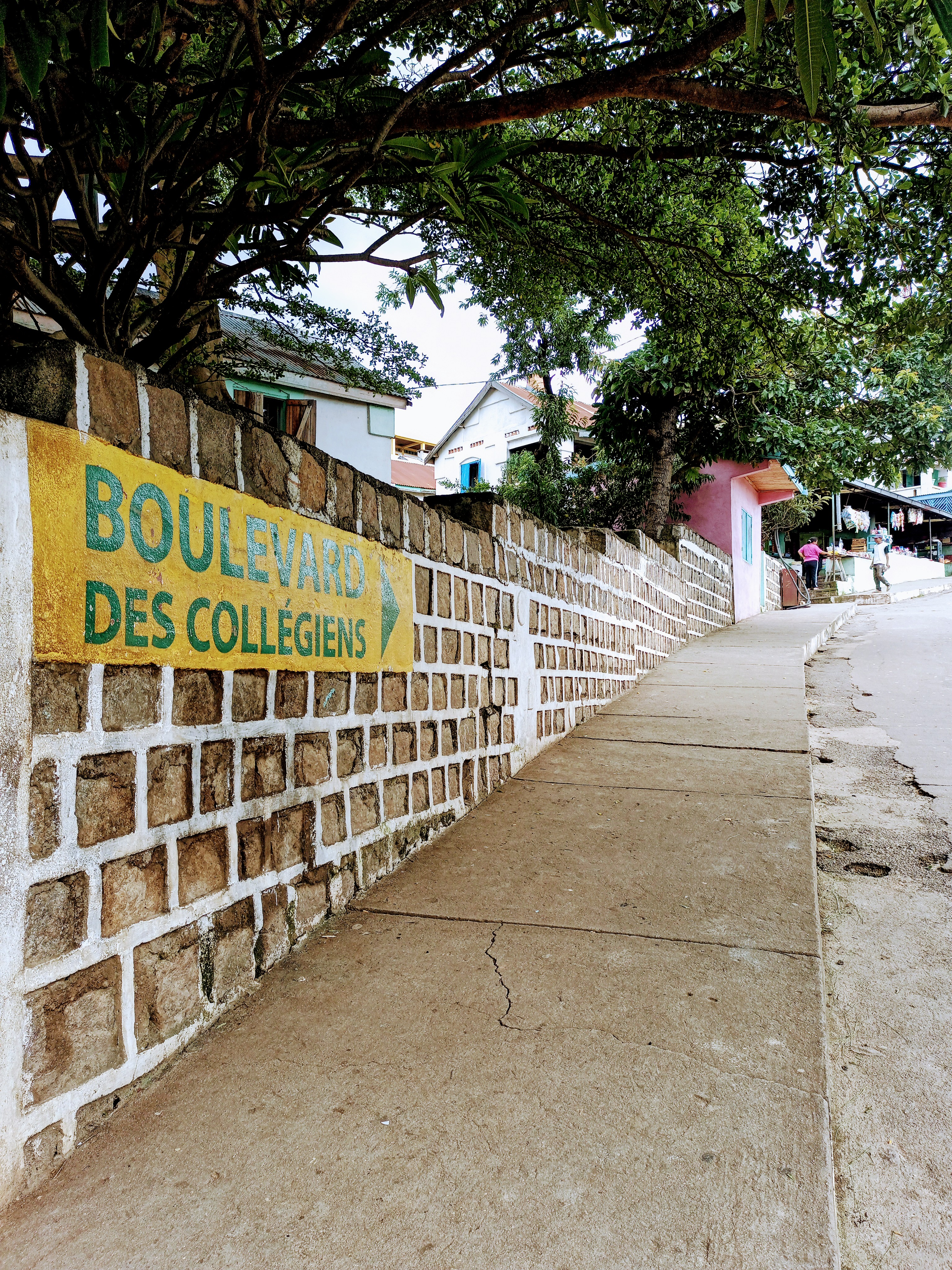

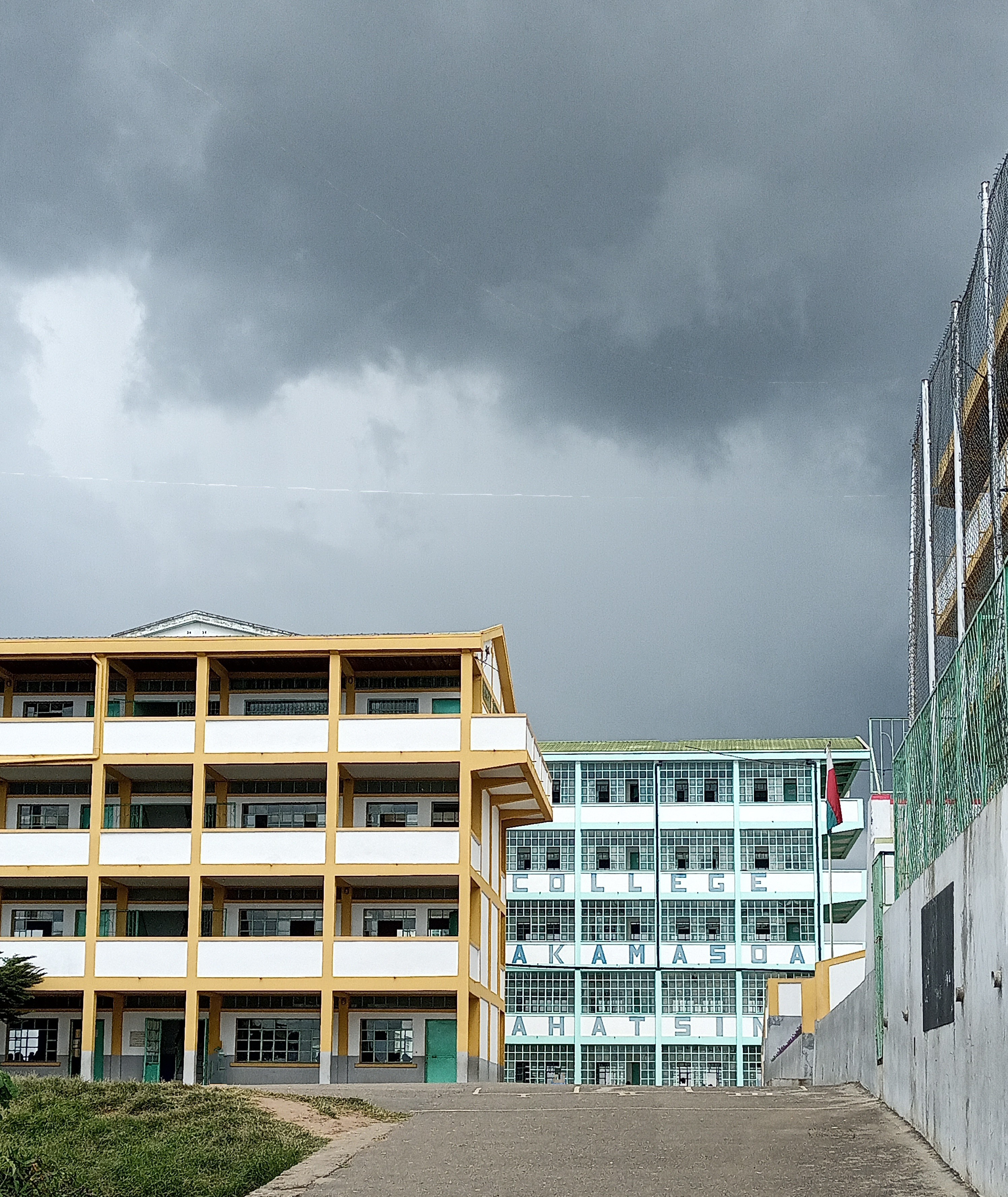

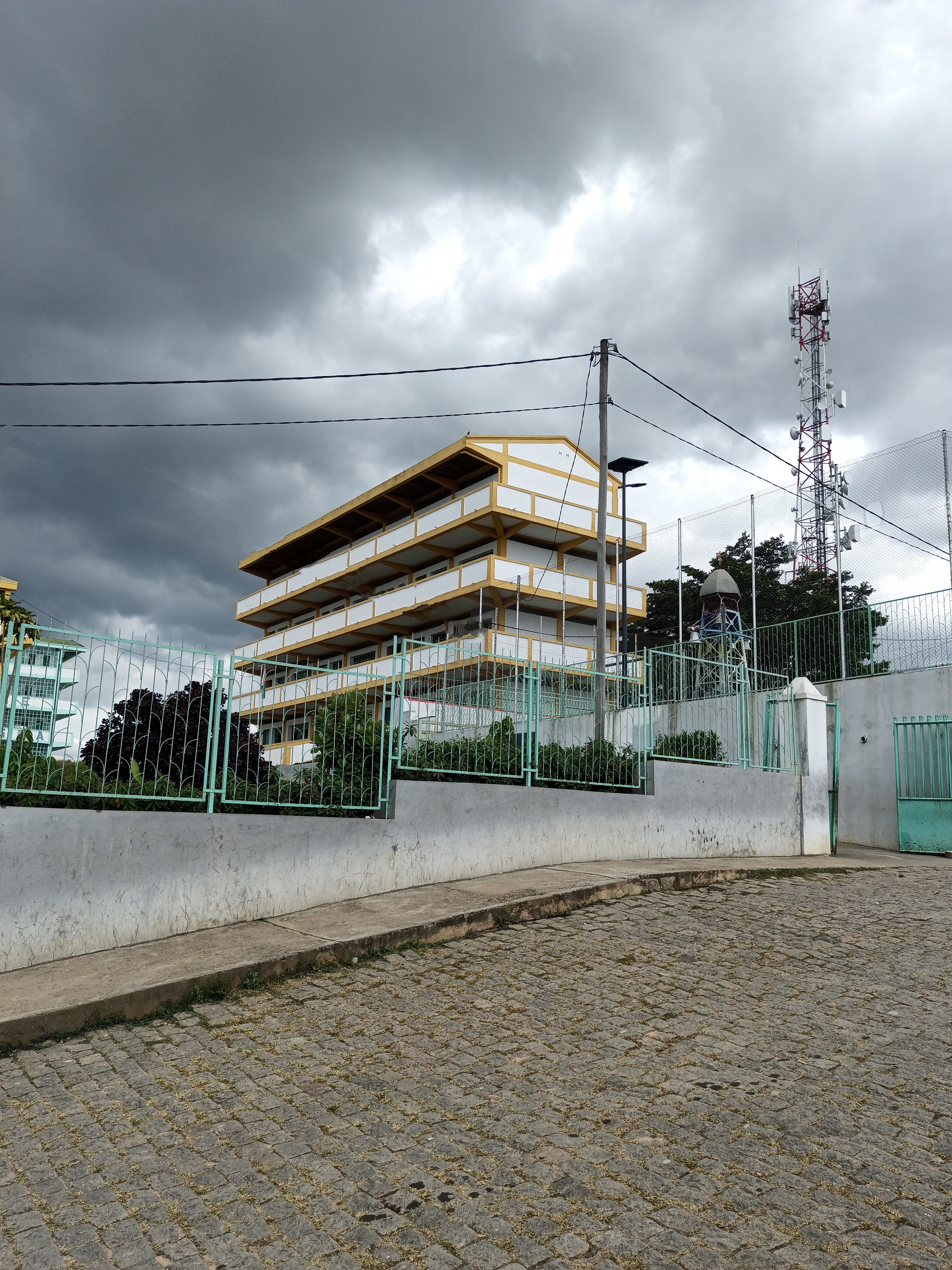

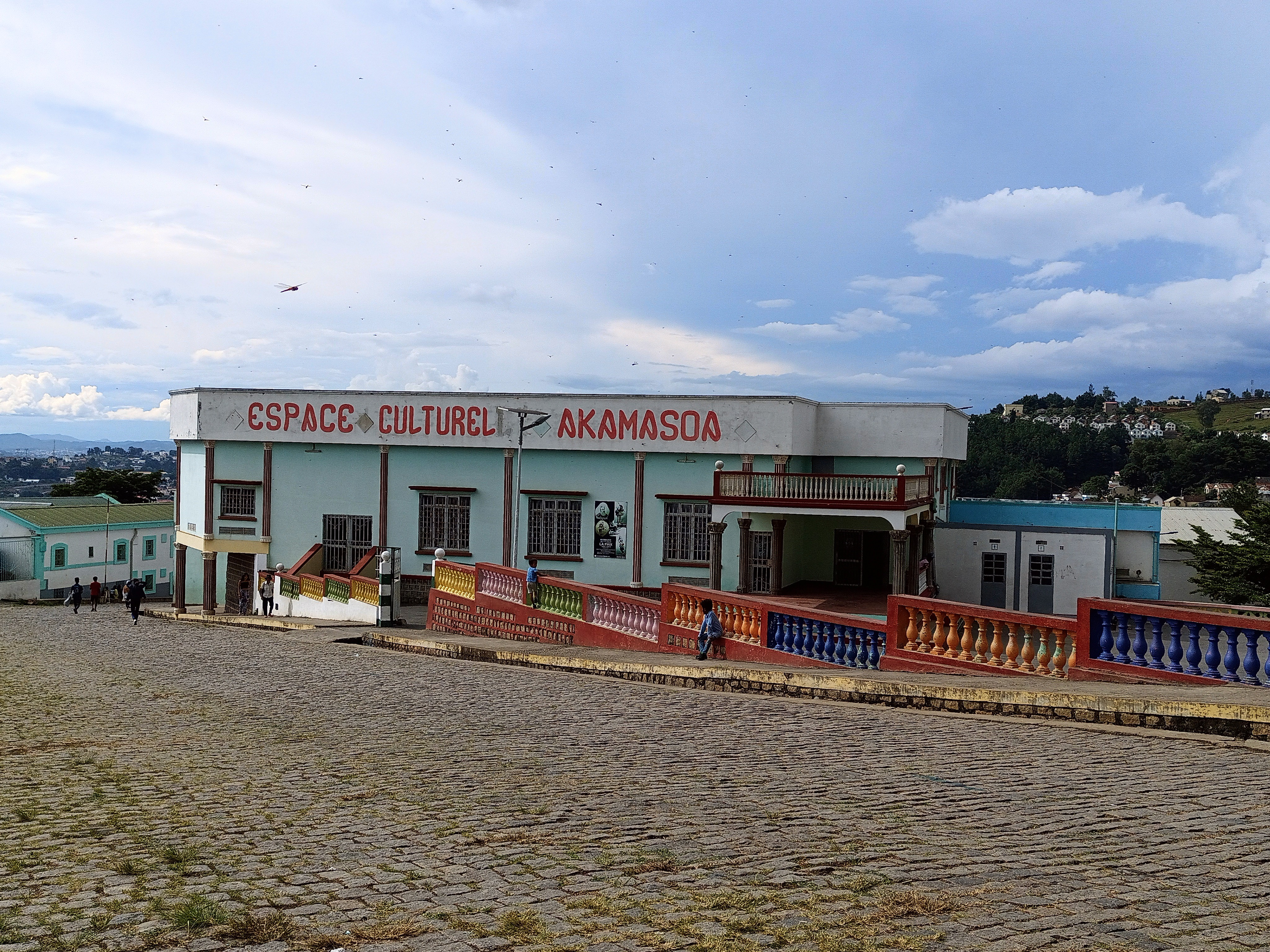

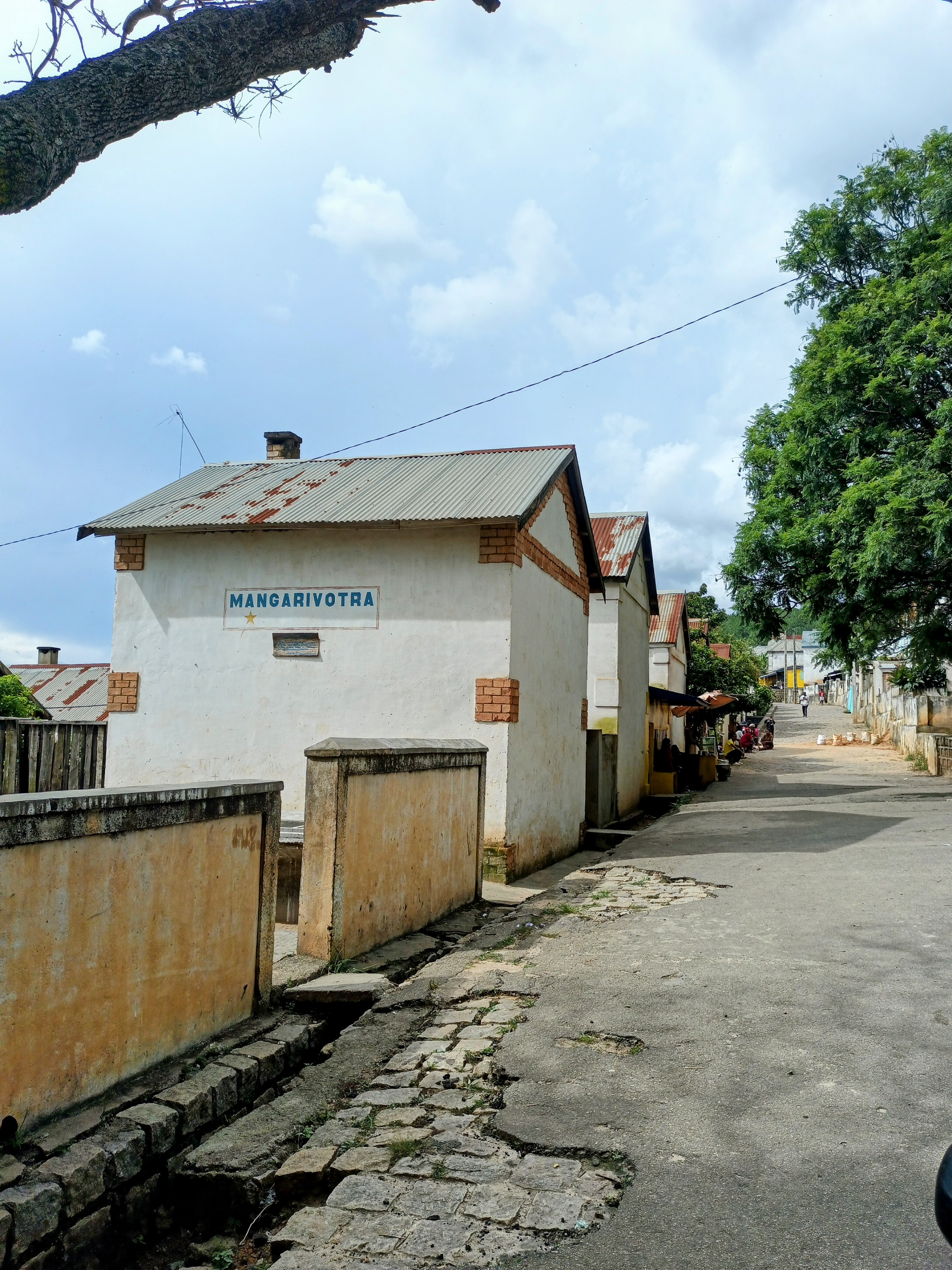

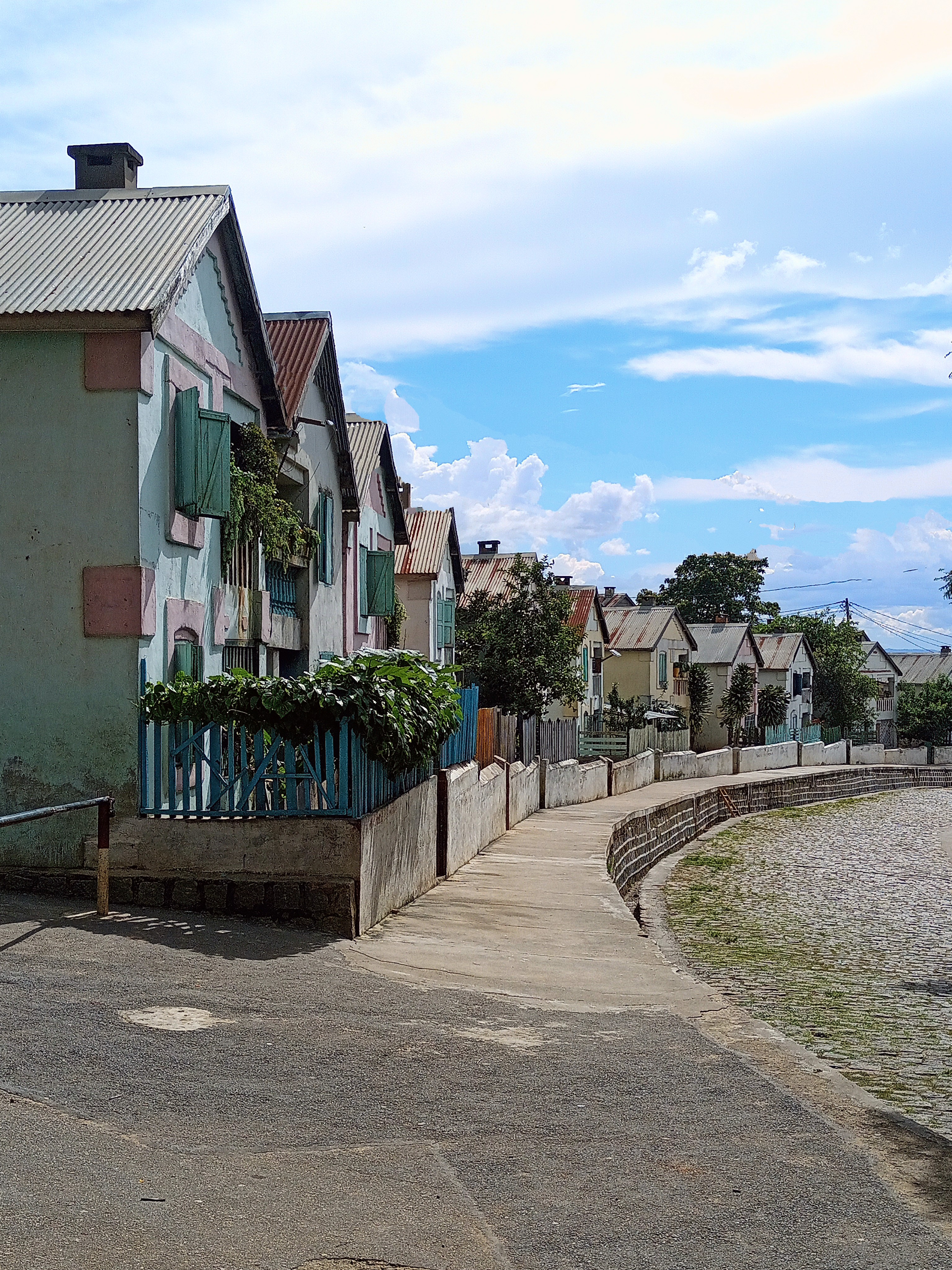

== Awards ==
In 2007, Opeka was named a knight of the Legion of Honor. The award, decreed on 12 October by the President of France, recognizes his 20 years of public service to the poor in Antananarivo. This award recognizes the ongoing fight led here against poverty by this man of faith and his 412 co-workers: physicians, midwives, teachers, engineers, technicians, and social workers, all of them from Madagascar.

In 2009 Opeka received the Golden Order for Services, which is the highest national decoration of Slovenia.

In 2012 Opeka was nominated for Nobel Peace Prize by united Slovenian European Parliament representatives regardless of political party affiliation. In 2013, MEP Lojze Peterle once again started with the nomination process for Opeka; the nomination was supported by Roman Jakič, then Slovenian MP (PS), and also by Janez Janša, then Slovenian PM, and the Slovenian Bishop's Conference. He was nominated for the Nobel Prize again in 2021.

== Controversy ==
In April 2026, as Madagascar is still in the midst of a major political crisis, rumors alleged that Pedro Opeka and the Akamasoa community were sheltering Colonel Patrick Rakotomamonjy, a Malagasy military officer who was being sought by the authorities. Akamasoa publicly denied the allegations, describing them as false and defamatory and stating that Opeka had no involvement in political or security matters. The organisation said it had referred the matter to the authorities responsible for combating cybercrime and called for action against those responsible for disseminating the claims.
