= Asociación de Ex-Alumnos del Colegio de La Salle =

Association of Colegio de La Salle Alumni
- Asociación de Ex-Alumnos del Colegio de La Salle
- Formation: April 7, 1969; 57 years ago
- Type: Nonprofit
- Location: Buenos Aires, Argentina
- Region served: Argentina
- President: Matías Bauso
- Vice-president: Hernán Sanguinetti
- Website: exalumnosdelasalle.org.ar

Asociación de Ex-Alumnos del Colegio de La Salle, mostly known as La Salle, is an Argentine organization formed by alumni of Colegio de La Salle.

La Salle has a sports section mostly known for its rugby union team, which plays in Segunda, the fifth division of the URBA league system. Other sports sections of the association are field hockey (affiliated to the Buenos Aires Hockey Association, with its teams participating in several competitions), and golf.

Headquarters are located in the city of Buenos Aires while the rugby team's field stands in General San Martín Partido, part of the Greater Buenos Aires region.

In 2011 the La Salle rugby squad was relegated to Grupo III (third division by then), after being defeated by CASA de Padua 21–17.

== Sports uniforms ==
Rugby	Hockey
