= Wild Horses (2015 film) =

2015 film by Robert Duvall

- Theatrical release poster
- Directed by: Robert Duvall
- Written by: Robert Duvall
- Produced by: Rob Carliner; Michael Mendelsohn
- Starring: Robert Duvall; James Franco; Josh Hartnett; Adriana Barraza; Jim Parrack; Luciana Duvall; H. Joaquin Jackson
- Cinematography: Barry Markowitz
- Edited by: Cary Gries
- Music by: Timothy Williams
- Production company: Patriot Pictures
- Distributed by: Entertainment One Films
- Release dates: March 17, 2015 (SXSW); June 5, 2015 (United States)
- Running time: 102 minutes
- Country: United States
- Language: English

Wild Horses is a 2015 American Western crime film written and directed by Robert Duvall. The film stars Robert Duvall, James Franco, Josh Hartnett, Adriana Barraza, Jim Parrack and Luciana Duvall. The film was released on June 5, 2015, by Entertainment One Films. This is Duvall's final film as a director.

== Plot ==
Texas Ranger Samantha Payne opens up a fifteen-year-old missing persons case and begins to suspect that the missing boy was murdered - and that a local rancher was involved.

== Cast ==
- Robert Duvall as Scott Briggs
- James Franco as Ben Briggs
- H. Joaquin Jackson as Ranger Jackson
- Josh Hartnett as KC Briggs
- Adriana Barraza as Mrs. Davis
- Jim Parrack as Deputy Rogers
- Luciana Duvall as Texas Ranger Samantha Payne
- Angie Cepeda as Maria Gonzales

== Release ==
The film premiered at South by Southwest on March 17, 2015. Shortly after the film's debut at the festival, the distribution rights were acquired by Entertainment One Films. The film was released in a limited release and through video on demand on June 5, 2015.

== Reception ==
Wild Horses received negative reviews from critics. On Rotten Tomatoes, the film has a rating of 17%, based on 12 reviews, with a rating of 4.2/10. On Metacritic, the film has a score of 44 out of 100, based on 9 critics, indicating "mixed or average reviews".
