= Club Atlético San Antonio de Padua =

(Argentina) CASA de Padua
- Full name: Club Atlético San Antonio de Padua
- Union: URBA
- Nickname: Tricolor
- Founded: 12 December 1926; 99 years ago
- Location: San Antonio de Padua, Argentina
- Ground: San Antonio de Padua
- Chairman: Carlos Miranda
- League: Primera C
- 2025: ?
1st kit	2nd kit

Official website
- casadepadua.com.ar

Club Atlético San Antonio de Padua, familiarly known as CASA de Padua, is an Argentine sports club located in the city of San Antonio de Padua, Buenos Aires Province. Although CASA is mostly known for its rugby union team, the club hosts the practise of other sports and activities such as basketball, field hockey, swimming, pilates and yoga.

The rugby union team currently plays in the Primera C, the 4th division of the Unión de Rugby de Buenos Aires league system, although CASA has focused on children and youth categories, where near 250 players are registered to the club.

The institution was founded as a football club on December 12, 1926, under the name "Lancaster Club". The meeting was held in the San Antonio de Padua railway station. The team debuted vs Club Nacional de Merlo (today Club Independiente) being hardly defeated 7-0. In 1928, the club changed to its current name. Rugby was added as sport in 1981.

== History in rugby ==
=== Predecessors ===
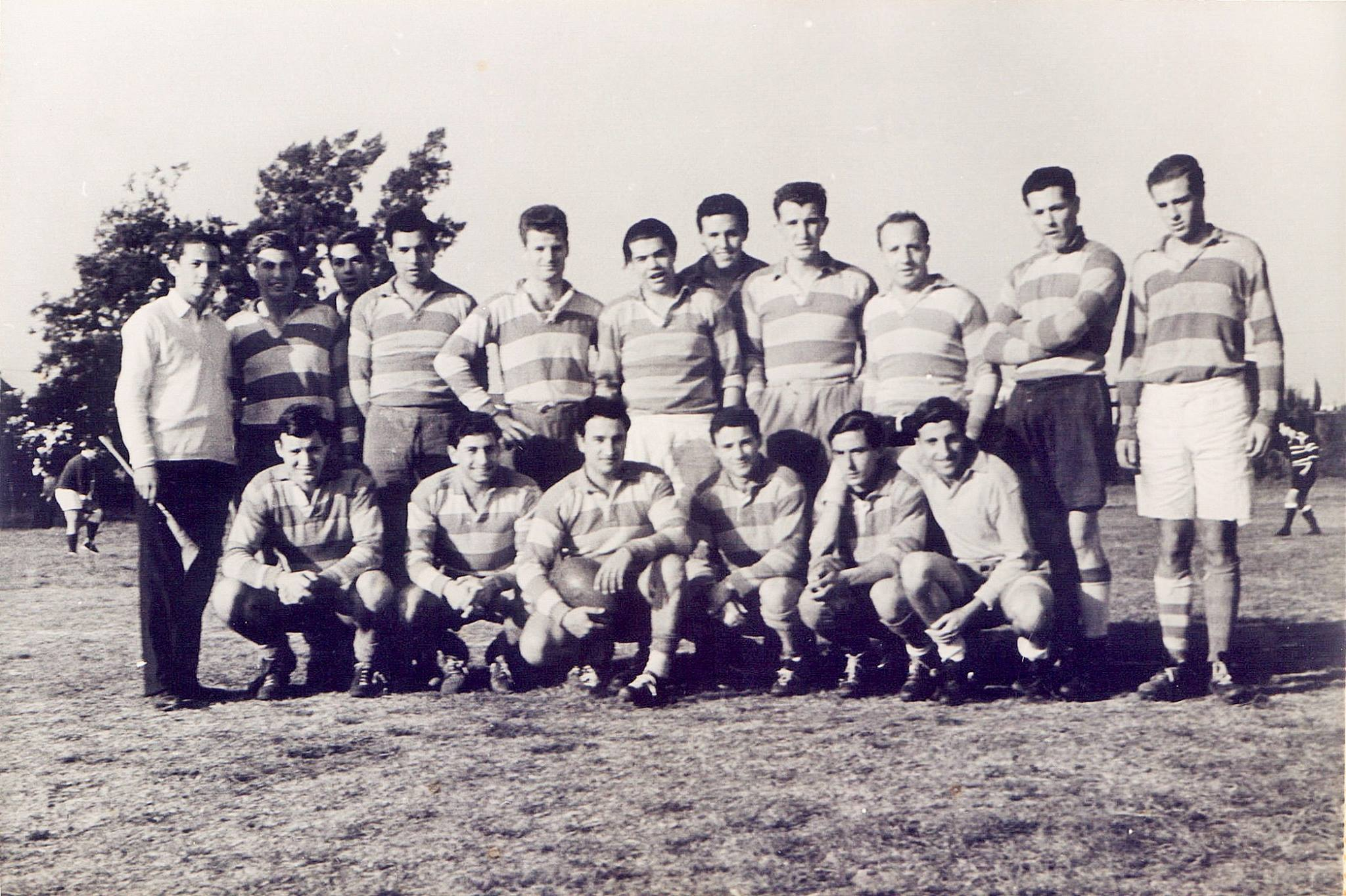
Padua R.C. in 1958. That team was a predecessor of the rugby section of CASA, started in 1981

Rugby in the city of San Antonio de Padua started when a group of students of the Instituto San Antonio moved to Morón to continue their education. In the local institution, a priest related to club Los Matreros (the only team in the region) invited them to join and practise the sport. As the students' enthusiasm increased, four of them tried to play rugby near the S.A. de Padua Church, being taught by Roberto Schamun, senior player of Buenos Aires Cricket & Rugby Club and Hurling Club. They named the team "Padua Rugby Club".

The recently formed club was introduced to the Argentine Rugby Union by the San Isidro Club (SIC). Nevertheless, Padua RC would be dissolved soon after.

In 1974, two players of Porteño A.C. of General Rodríguez, formed a rugby team in Padua and then met former players of Padua R.C., forming the rugby team of "Ateneo S.A. de Padua", linked to the Franciscal Order. They registered with UAR as members, with Miguel A. Bruno and Eduardo Jar as coaches. The shirt was squared (like a draughts board) in red and green. Ateneo participated in UAR tournaments as guest team, in "preclasificación" division.

=== CASA rugby team ===
In 1981, the Ateneo RC dissolved due to internal problems. Some players went to Gimnasia y Esgrima de Ituzaingó (GEI) and others to Mariano Moreno. Most players and their coaches decided to join Club Atlético San Antonio de Padua. As part of the club, the rugby team adopted the institution's colors, black, gold and purple. The Municipality of Merlo gave CASA de Padua a vacant land on Antezana street, where the club built a rugby venue. That same year the club debuted playing in Preclasificación, the lowest division of the UAR (then took over by the URBA).

One year after, the whole rugby team of GEI joined CASA. In 1983, they took part of UAR championships as guests, two years later the team promoted to the next division, while rugby at the club increased its categories to different age levels.

In 1989, CASA de Padua promoted to Ascenso division and two years later promoted to the second division. The first international tour came in 1993, when CASA toured on Namibia and South Africa playing some friendly matches with those national teams. CASA reached the first division (Grupo I) in 1995 and went on a tour again, visiting United States and Bahamas to play there.

The club would trip to South Africa two more times, in 2001 and 2009. In 2011, CASA was near to be relegated to Grupo III, but the team finally remained in second division after beating La Salle 21-17. In 2013, the CASA de Padua rugby section broke up from the main club to form and independent institution. The recently formed club was named "Casa de Padua Rugby & Hockey", focusing on the sports of rugby union and field hockey.
