= Geraldin Rojas =

Argentine tango dancer

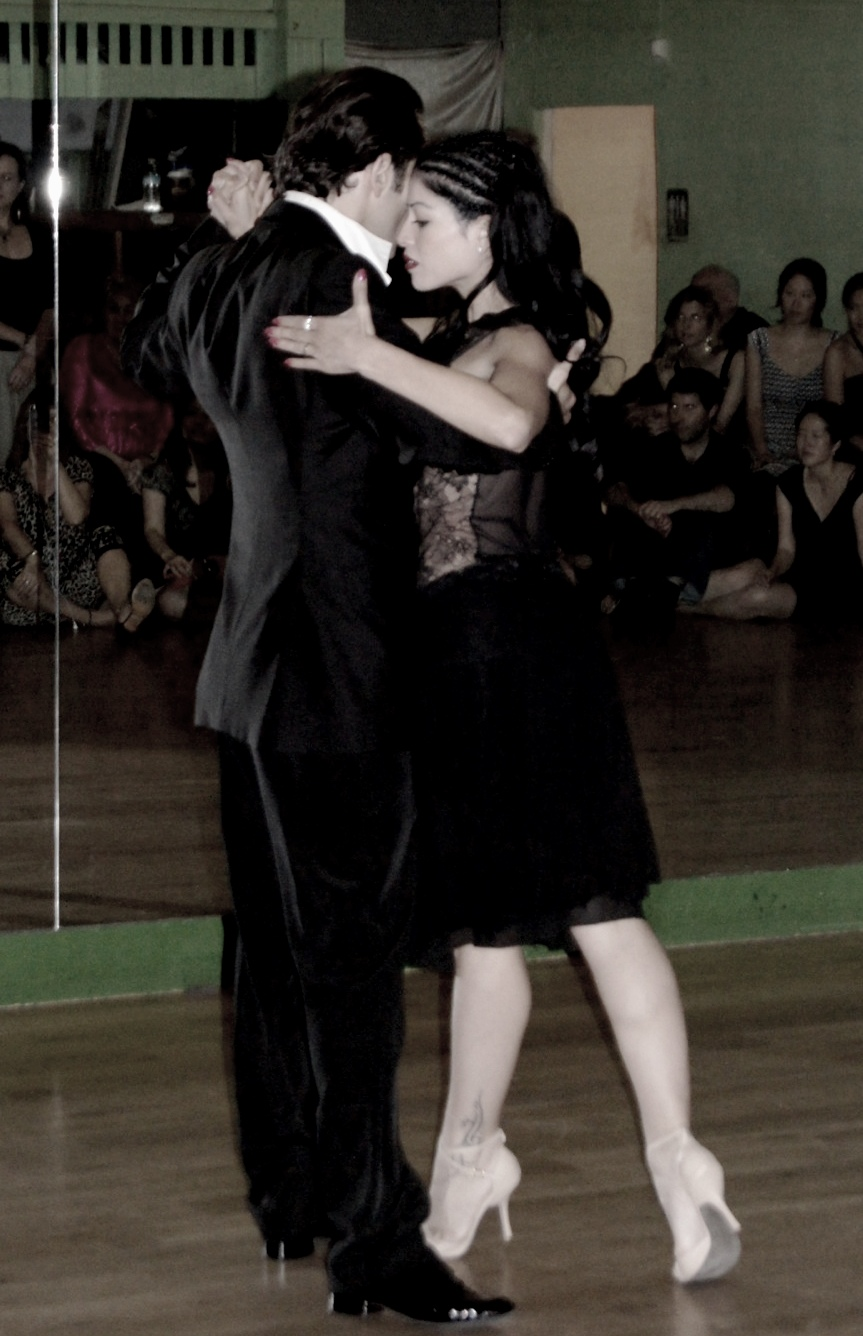
Geraldin Rojas and Ezequiel Paludi in San Francisco Studio Garcia in February 2012

Geraldin Rojas (born 6 July 1981) is a contemporary Argentine tango dancer, also known as Geraldin Rojas de Paludi.

She started her career in 1988. She performed tango in the films Assassination Tango, The Man Who Captured Eichmann, and Je ne suis pas là pour être aimé. At age 16 she ran away from home to be a tango dancer. She dances with her husband Ezequiel Paludi. They have performed in Forever tango.

She has danced in tango festivals worldwide.
