= Mariano Billinghurst =

Argentine businessman and politician

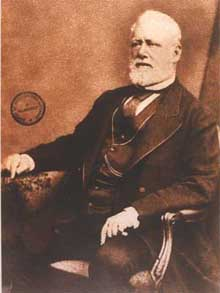

Personal details
- Born: Mariano Daniel Billinghurst Agrelo; November 26, 1810 Buenos Aires, Argentina
- Died: June 13, 1892 (aged 81) Buenos Aires, Argentina
- Spouse: Mercedes Marzano Agrelo
- Occupation: Businessman
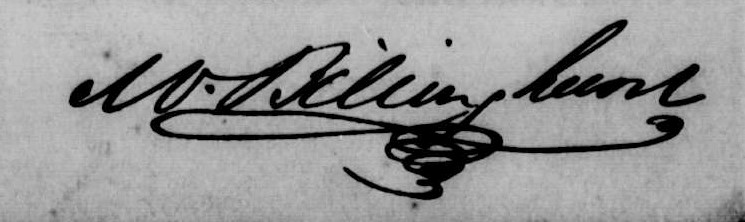
- Signature

Mariano Billinghurst (November 26, 1810 – June 13, 1892) was an Argentine businessman and politician, pioneer in the construction of the national railroads. The locality of Billinghurst in the Greater Buenos Aires, and the Billinghurst street in Buenos Aires are named after him.

== Biography ==
He was born in Buenos Aires, son of Robert Billinghurst, an immigrant born in Surrey, England, and Maria Francisca Agrelo Moreyra, born in Buenos Aires. His father had served as gunner during the Siege of Montevideo.

He had to go into exile for political reasons in Montevideo, Uruguay, where he lived between 1840 and 1850. During this decade he began his career as an entrepreneur, being owner of a cloth factory in Buenos Aires. Later he served as auctioneer at the first property sales house of the city.

As a railway entrepreneur, he installed the horse-drawn tram lines, connecting Plaza de la Victoria to Flores and Plaza de la Victoria to Belgrano. He also built the railway line that linked Buenos Aires with the city of Rosario.

== Family ==
Mariano was the great-grandfather of aviator Susana Ferrari Billinghurst. Susana in turn was the grandmother of actress Luciana Pedraza, the wife of actor Robert Duvall.
