= Susana Ferrari Billinghurst =

Argentine aviator (1914–1999)

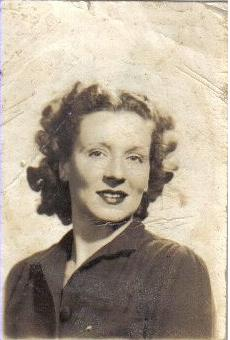
- Born: 20 March 1914; Buenos Aires, Argentina
- Died: 13 August 1999 (aged 85); Salta, Argentina
- Occupation: Aviator
- Relatives: Luciana Pedraza (granddaughter); Guillermo Billinghurst (cousin)

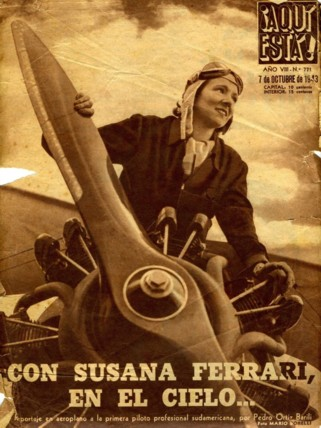
With Susana Ferrari in the sky ... Portada Revista 1943

Susana Ferrari Billinghurst (20 March 1914 – 13 August 1999) was an Argentine aviator who was the first woman in South America to earn a commercial pilot's license, in 1937.

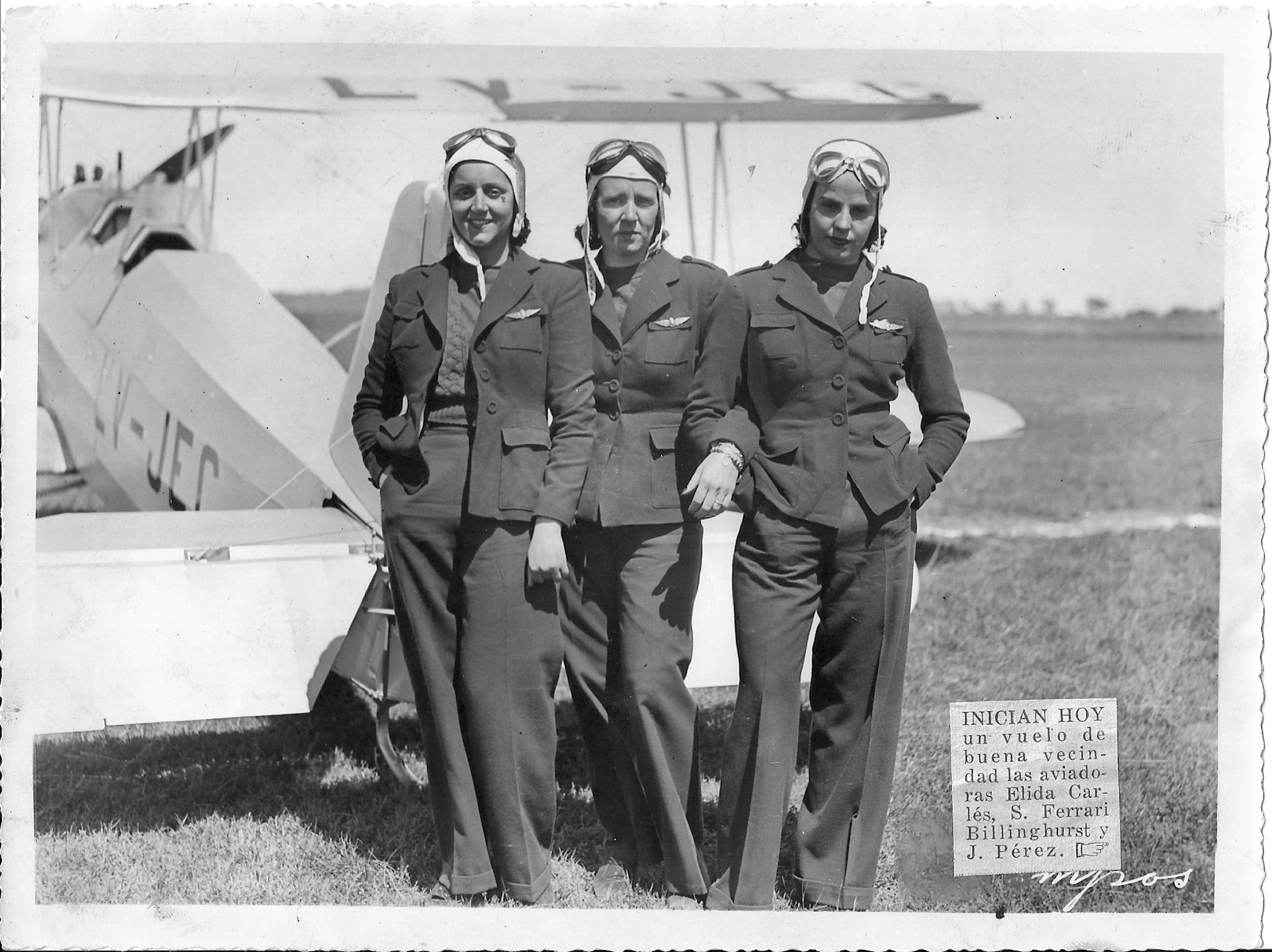
Elida Carles, Susana Ferrari Billinghurst and Julia Perez Cattoni – 9 November 1943

== Career ==
In 1937, Billinghurst became the first woman in South America to earn a commercial pilot's license. In 1940, she piloted an amphibious Sikorsky S-43 in a 4,000-mile trip from Panama to Argentina.

During the 1943 Revolution Day in Argentina, she entered the presidential house with a symbolic bouquet, getting from the new president a historical engagement in favour of women's rights, particularly in the aviation field.

In November 1943, she made a flight to Uruguay with two other aviators (Elida Carlés and Julia Perez Cattoni), officially representing the Argentine government.

== Family ==
Billinghurst was of Italian, English and Irish descent. She was the great-granddaughter of Mariano Billinghurst, after whom the city of Billinghurst, Argentina, is named; niece of Argentine aviator Lisandro Billinghurst, and first cousin twice removed of Guillermo Billinghurst, who was the president of Peru. Susana was the grandmother of actress Luciana Pedraza, the widow of actor Robert Duvall.

== Bibliography ==
- Vitry, Roberto. Mujeres Salteñas: Susana Ferrari Billinghurst. Editorial Hanne, 2000.
