= Luciana Pedraza =

Argentine actress and director (born 1972)

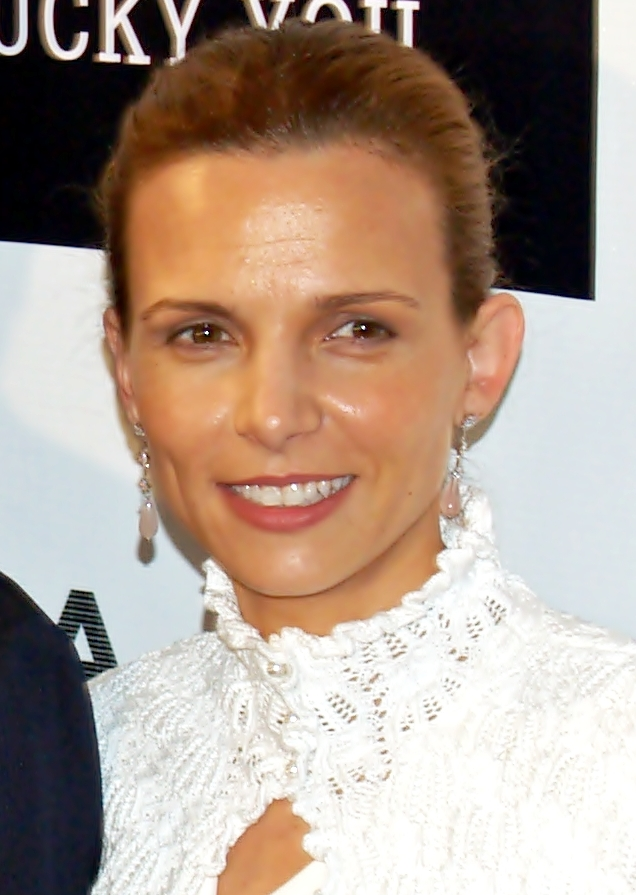
- Pedraza at the 2007 Tribeca Film Festival
- Born: January 5, 1972 (age 54); Salta, Argentina
- Education: University of Buenos Aires
- Occupations: Actress; director
- Spouse: Robert Duvall (m. 2005; died 2026)
- Relatives: Susana Ferrari Billinghurst (grandmother)

Luciana Pedraza (Spanish pronunciation: [luˈsjana peˈðɾasa]; born January 5, 1972) is an Argentine actress and director. She was married to American actor Robert Duvall from 2005 until his death in 2026. She is the granddaughter of Argentine aviation pioneer Susana Ferrari Billinghurst.

== Early life ==
Born in the Argentine Northwest, in the city of Salta, she grew up in the province of Jujuy.

She is the oldest of five sisters. After graduating from the University of Buenos Aires, she became the marketing director of W. & Associates. In 1996, while strolling down a street in Buenos Aires, she approached actor Robert Duvall to invite him to a party without knowing who he was. They shared the same birthday, January 5, 41 years apart.

== Career ==
Pedraza wrote and directed the short documentary The Portrait of Billy Joe (2004) and appeared in the 2002 film Assassination Tango, which was written, produced, directed by, and starring her future husband Robert Duvall. She also appeared in another film of his, Wild Horses.

=== Later career ===
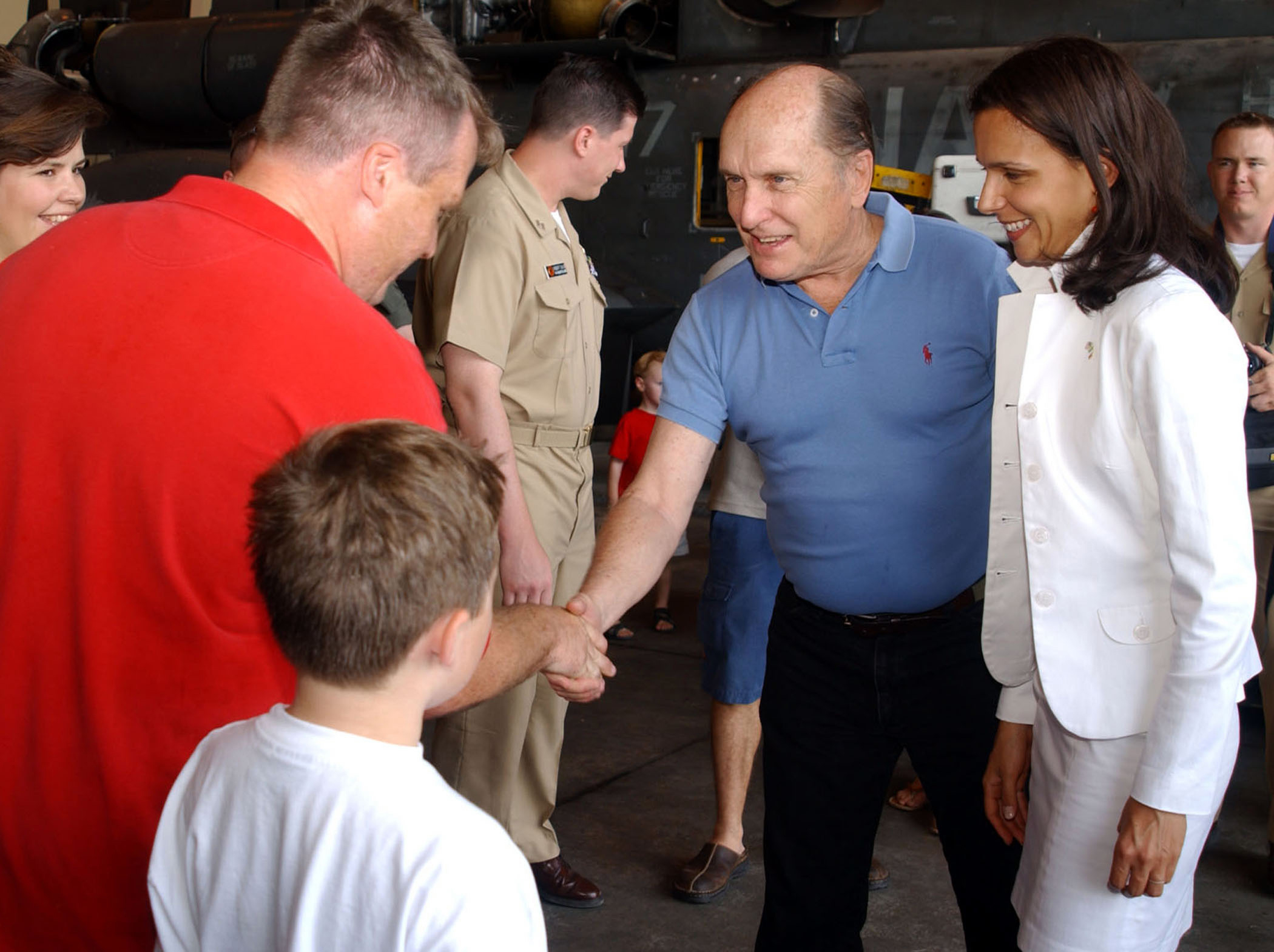
Pedraza with future husband Robert Duvall, shaking hands with a member of the US Navy Black Stallions at the Taormina Film Fest in Sicily in June 2003

Luciana and Robert Duvall founded The Robert Duvall Children's Fund in 2001 to help impoverished children and families of Northern Argentina. Since then, the non-profit organization has expanded its reach to assist children and families around the world by partnering with reputable organizations. Among their organizations is Pro Mujer, a non-profit dedicated to helping Latin America's poorest women help themselves through micro-credit, business training and health care links.

Pedraza's husband, Robert Duvall, died on February 15, 2026.
