= General San Martín Partido =

General San Martín Partido de General San Martín
- Department
- Coat of arms Logo

- location of General San Martín Partido in Gran Buenos Aires
- Coordinates: 34°34′S 58°31′W
- Country: Argentina
- Established: 18 December 1856
- Founder: provincial decree
- Seat: San Martín

Government
  - Intendant: Fernando Moreira (UP)

Area
  - Total: 56 km^{2} (22 sq mi)

Population
  - Total: 422,830
  - Density: 7,600/km^{2} (20,000/sq mi)
- Demonym: sanmartinense
- Postal Code: B1650
- IFAM: BUE055
- Patron saint: San Antonio de Padua
- Website: www.sanmartin.gov.ar

General San Martín Partido is a partido in the Gran Buenos Aires urban area, immediately to the north-west of the Capital federal in Buenos Aires Province, Argentina.

The provincial subdivision has a population of 422,830 inhabitants in an area of 56 km^{2} (22 sq mi), and its capital city is also named San Martín.

== Name ==
The partido (district) and its capital are named in honor of General José de San Martín, who led Argentina against the Spanish Empire in the Argentine War of Independence.

== Sports ==
The partido is home to Primera División football team Chacarita Juniors, and to fifth Division football team Club Social y Deportivo Central Ballester.

In rugby union San Martín partido is home to CEC Liceo Militar.

== Districts ==
- Barrio Parque General San Martín
- Billinghurst
- Ciudad del Libertador General José de San Martín
- Ciudad Jardín El Libertador
- Loma Hermosa
- José León Suárez
- San Andrés
- Villa Ballester
- Villa Libertad
- Villa Lynch
- Villa Maipú

=== Smaller neighbourhoods ===
These neighbourhoods have been absorbed into the municipality and are no longer commonly used.

- Villa Ayacucho
- Villa Bernardo Monteagudo
- Villa Chacabuco
- Villa Coronel José M. Zapiola
- Villa General Antonio J. de Sucre
- Villa General Eugenio Necochea
- Villa General José Tomás Guido
- Villa General Juan G. Las Heras
- Villa Godoy Cruz
- Villa Granaderos de San Martín
- Villa Gregoria Matorras
- Villa Juan Martín de Pueyrredón
- Villa María Irene de los Remedios de Escalada
- Villa Marqués Alejandro María de Aguado
- Villa Parque Presidente Figueroa Alcorta
- Villa Parque San Lorenzo
- Villa Yapeyú

== Gallery ==
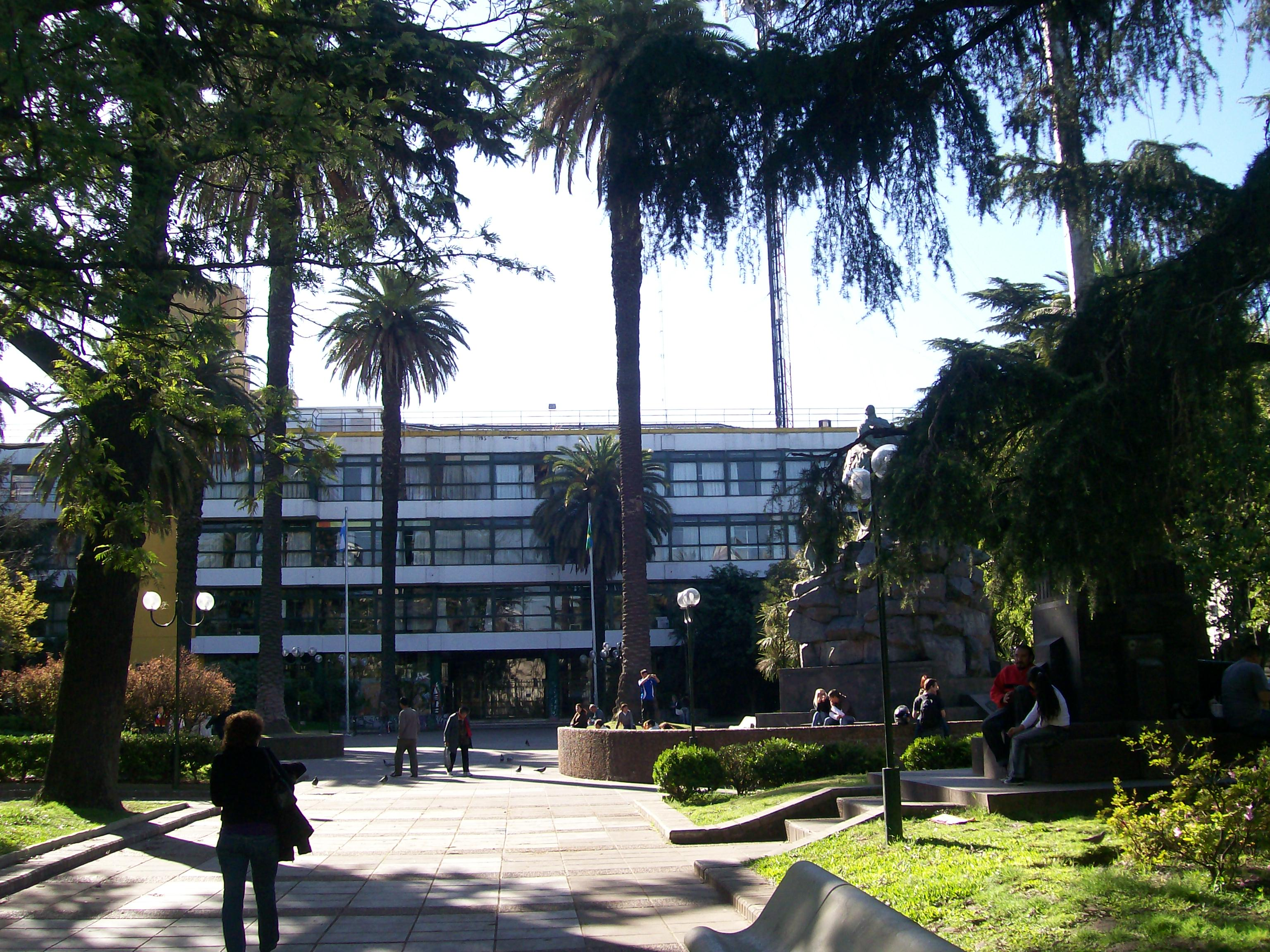
San Martín Town Square

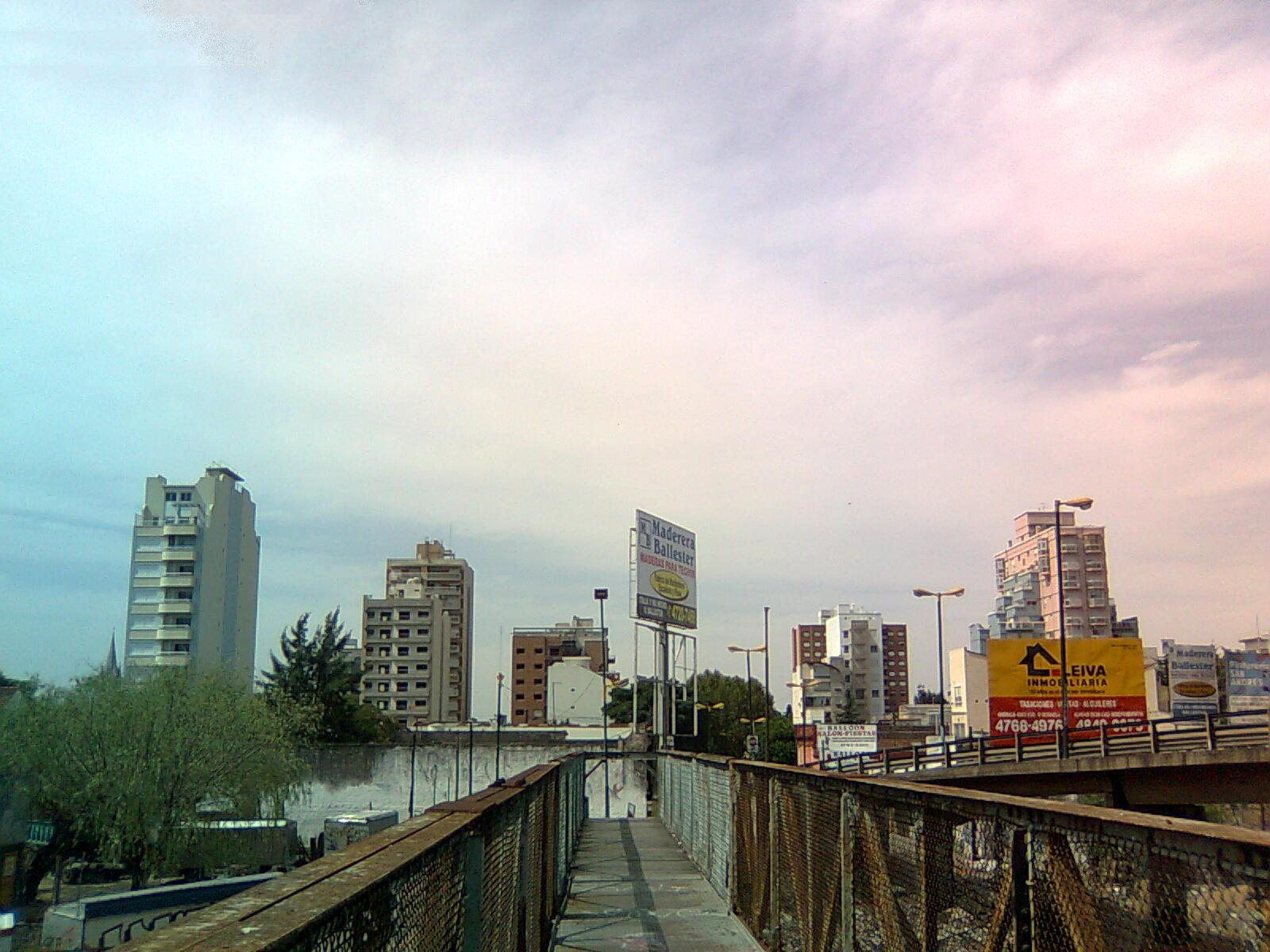
Villa Ballester city

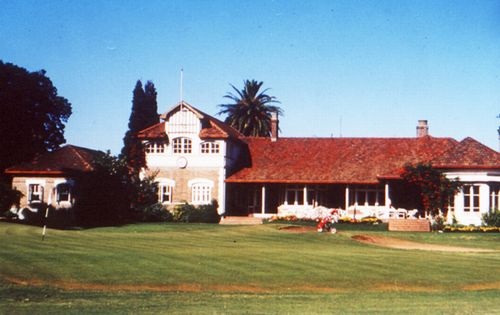
San Andrés Golf Club.

== Notable people ==
- José Hernández, (1834–1886) journalist and poet
- Óscar Alfredo Gálvez, (1913–1989) racing driver
- Pedro Opeka, (b. 1948), Catholic missionary
- Zully Moreno, (1920–1999) actress
- Fernando Siro, (1931–2006) actor, film director and screenwriter
- Roberto DeVicenzo, (1923–2017) golfer
- Virginia Gamba, (b.1954) Under Secretary General, United Nations
