= Gimnasia y Esgrima de Ituzaingó =

Gimnasia y Esgrima (Ituzaingó)
- Nickname: GEI, Lobo
- League: Metropolitano
- Founded: 20 June 1925; 100 years ago
- Arena: Estadio Milano
- Capacity: 3000 persons
- Location: Ituzaingó
- Main sponsor: Dulkre
- President: Santiago Fraga
- Head coach: juan gonzales
- Team captain: Nicolas stanic
- 2026 position: 5
- Division titles: Liga Federal
- Website: clubgei.com.ar
Local	Visitante

Club Gimnasia y Esgrima de Ituzaingó, shortnamed GEI, is an Argentine sports club, located in the Ituzaingó district of the homonymous partido in Greater Buenos Aires. Although other sports are also practised at the club, GEI is mostly known for its basketball team, which currently plays in Torneo Metropolitano, the main competition organised by "Febamba" (an acronym for "Basketball Federation of the Buenos Aires Metropolitan Area").

In rugby union, the club currently plays in Tercera División, the sixth division of the URBA league system. GEI also has a women's rugby team competing in "Torneo Femenino", organised by the same body. The field hockey section is affiliated to the Buenos Aires Hockey Association (AHBA), taking part of its competitions.

Apart from those sports, GEI hosts the practice of other activities such as basque pelota, chess fencing, football, handball, hatha yoga, rhythmic gymnastics, swimming, taekwondo, tennis, volleyball, and yoga. Artistic activities include musical theatre and tango.

== History ==
The club was founded on June 25, 1925, by a group of people met at the Aquiles Longoni's house. Jorge Passo was named as its first president. In 1936 three members donated a ticket for the Christmas Lottery (a traditional game of luck in Argentina) which finally won the prize. The money obtained was destinated to acquire the land where Gimnasia build its installations and facilities.

The GEI rugby team take part, by the first time, in 1960, in the 3rd. Division of the UBA championship. That time was composed by some senior people that migrates from the "Los Matreros Rugby" team and completed with young players promoted from the GEI junior divisions.

At the end of the 1970s a tennis championship was held at the club, where then famous Argentine players as Ivanna Madruga and Carlos Gattiker took part of the event.
