= Loma Hermosa =

- District
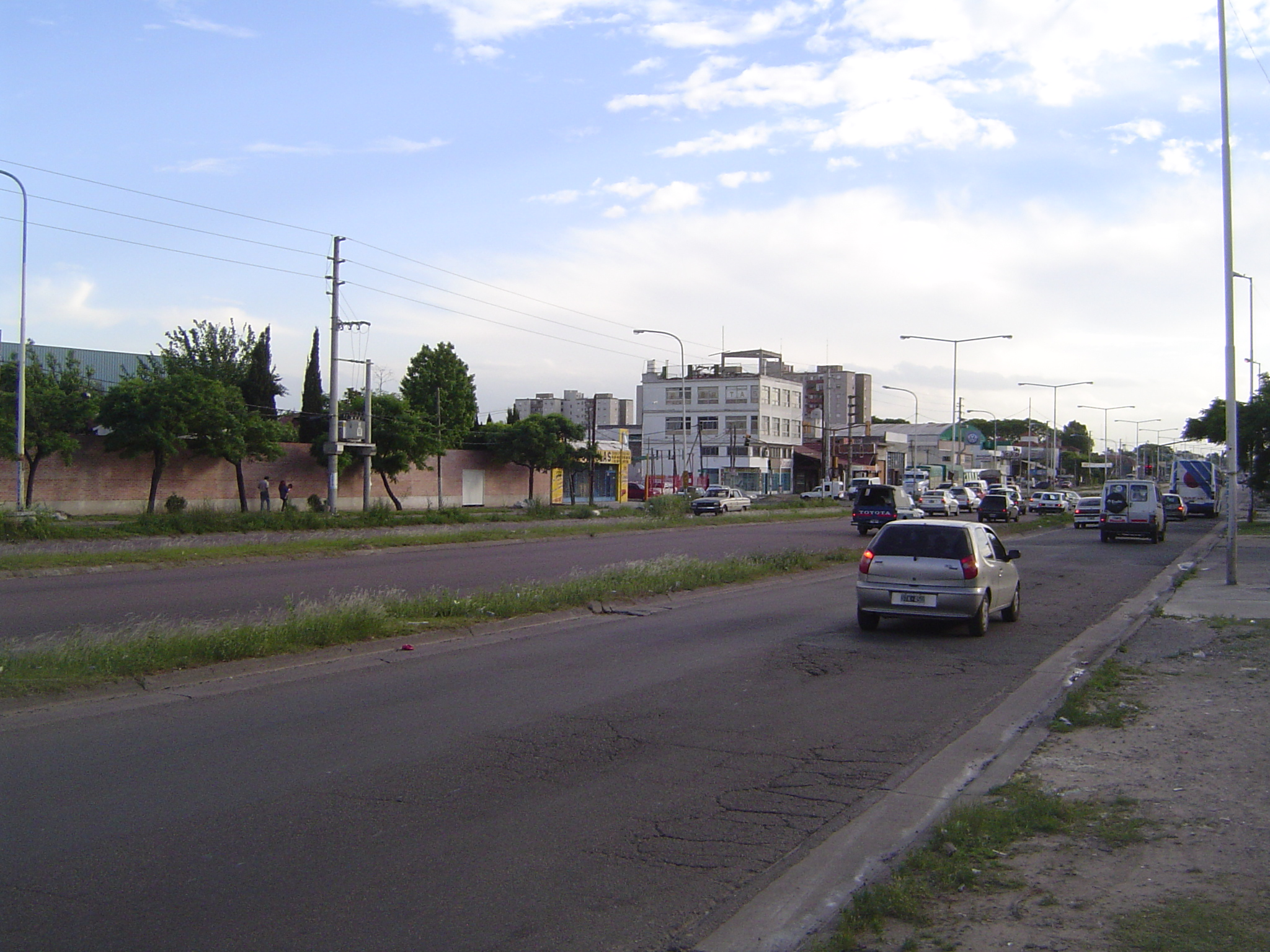
- Provincial Route 4 in Loma Hermosa.

- Location in Greater Buenos Aires
- Coordinates: 34°34′S 58°36′W
- Country: Argentina
- Province: Buenos Aires
- Partido: General San Martín
- Elevation: 24 m (79 ft)

Population (2001 census [INDEC])
  - Total: 17,960
  - Density: 5,986.6/km^{2} (15,505/sq mi)
- CPA Base: B 1657
- Area code: +54 11

Loma Hermosa is a town in [ General San Martín ]] of Buenos Aires Province, Argentina. It is located in the Greater Buenos Aires urban agglomeration. Part of the town falls in the General San Martín Partido.

== Sport ==
The Asociación Social y Deportiva Justo José de Urquiza football club is based in Loma Hermosa.

== Notable people ==
- Claudia Ciardone, model and theatre actress
