= CEC Liceo Militar =

(Argentina) Liceo Militar
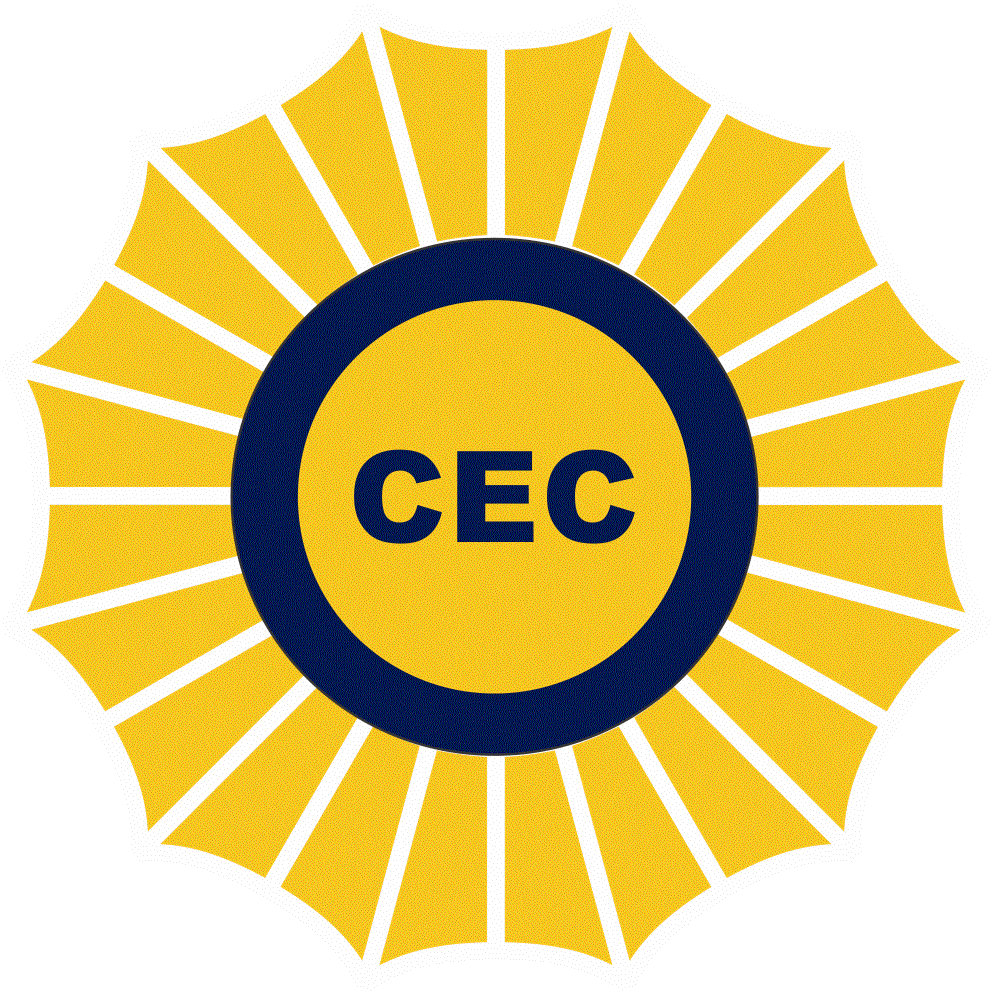
- Full name: Círculo de Ex-Cadetes del Liceo Militar General San Martín
- Union: URBA
- Nickname(s): Milico, Tricolor
- Founded: 2 January 1950; 75 years ago
- Location: Av. Márquez 6156, Loma Hermosa, Argentina
- Ground(s): Loma Hermosa
- President: Roberto Linsalata
- Coach(es): Gustavo "Pepo" Farias
- League(s): Primera C
- 2023: 2nd. (promoted)
Team kit

Official website
- cecliceomilitargsm.org.ar

Círculo de Ex-Cadetes del Liceo Militar General San Martín, or simply Liceo Militar, is an Argentine rugby union and field hockey club sited in the Loma Hermosa district of General San Martín Partido in Greater Buenos Aires. The rugby union team currently plays in Primera C, the fourth division of the URBA league system.

== History ==
In 1950, former cadets of the military high school General San Martín founded the rugby club "Circulo de Ex-Cadetes del Liceo Militar General San Martín".

Playing only friendly games for the first few years, the club registered with the Unión de Rugby de Buenos Aires in 1962 and entered the URBA league system the same year. A field hockey section would be created many years later.

After occupying other clubs' premises for the first fifteen years of its existence, the club would acquire its own installations near Loma Hermosa in 1974.

Liceo Militar entered the URBA league system in 1962 and won promotion to the highest level of provincial rugby in 1970. In 2010 Liceo Militar play in 1st divition of Urba tournament. Today the team still plays at the highest level of URBA's league system, fielding teams at all levels. Although Liceo Militar has won titles at underage levels, the team has not achieved senior titles to date.

Some of Liceo's most notable players throughout its history were Roberto Taschetti, Mariano Perasso, Daniel Solaberrieta, Alejandro Braceras, Rodrigo Garcia Estebarena, Nicolas Basile, Javier Carella, Juan Somoza, Julian Carballeda, Sebastian Suarez, Ignacio Oliva, Juan Pablo Mendoza, Franco Schenone. "Nino" Pauna. Catamarca Ocampo and Carlos "Veco" Villegas was also a notables coach.

The club's main rival is Liceo Naval.
