= Lanús Rugby Club =

Lanús
- Full name: Lanús Rugby Club
- Union: URBA
- Nickname: Vikingos
- Founded: 20 October 1980; 45 years ago
- Location: Remedios de Escalada, Lanús Partido, Argentina
- Ground: Remedios de Escalada
- Chairman: Javier Lorenzo Álvarez
- League: Primera C
- 2025: 6th.
Team kit

Lanús Rugby Club is an Argentine rugby union club based in the Remedios de Escalada district of Lanús Partido. The team currently plays in Primera C, the fourth division of the URBA league system.

The club has also a women's rugby team competing in "Torneo Femenino", organised by the same body.

== History ==
Although the URBA recognises the date of foundation of Lanús Rugby Club in 1980, other sources state that was not an official foundation, setting 1990 as the year of establishment.

As the club did not have facilities, they rented the former Central Buenos Aires club in Florencio Varela. In the 1990s the Municipality of Lanús gave the club a land, where they built two rugby fields, having remained there until present days.

Although the club is not related to Club Atlético Lanús, it adopted the characteristic maroon color that has been a mark of identity for the Southern club, although jersey's predominant color is black.

Lanús RC was nicknamed Vikingos due to the club had printed promotional decals featuring comic strip character Hägar the Horrible.
