= Ciudad Jardín El Libertador =

- Town
- Location in Greater Buenos Aires
- Coordinates: 34°34′S 58°32′W
- Country: Argentina
- Province: Buenos Aires
- Partido: General San Martín
- Founded: 1956
- Elevation: 28 m (92 ft)

Population (2001 census [INDEC])
  - Total: 61,780
- CPA Base: B 1657
- Area code: +54 11

Ciudad Jardín El Libertador is a town in General San Martín Partido of Buenos Aires Province, Argentina. It is located in the Greater Buenos Aires area.

== Population ==
With 61,780 inhabitants in 2001 2001 census [INDEC], the town is the most populous in the General San Martín Partido.
