= Club Los Cedros =

Argentine sports club

(Argentina) Los Cedros
- Full name: Club Los Cedros
- Union: URBA
- Founded: 31 December 1975; 50 years ago
- Location: Los Polvorines, Argentina
- Ground: San Miguel
- Chairman: Fernando Migliardi
- Coach: Matias tapia Gomez "El Tano"
- League: URBA tercera
- 2025: 3
1st kit	2nd kit

Official website
- clubloscedros.com.ar

Club Los Cedros is an Argentine sports club based in the Los Polvorines district of Greater Buenos Aires. Although other activities are hosted by the club, Los Cedros is mostly known for its rugby union team, which currently plays in the tercera Superior, the Sixth division of the Unión de Rugby de Buenos Aires league system.

Apart from rugby, other sports practised at Los Cedros are field hockey, football, and tennis.

== History ==
Current club's facilities were part of a great cattle ranch owned by Admiral Sixto Barilar, known as "Villa Barilari". When his widow died, the ranch was expropriated by the government and then sold, being acquired by the Argentine Rugby Union in the 1960s. The purpose of the purchase was to build a great rugby union stadium, although the idea was later dismissed, therefore it was the club which finally purchased the ranch.
