= Billinghurst, Argentina =

Billinghurst
- Location in Greater Buenos Aires
- Coordinates: 34°34′S 58°32′W
- Country: Argentina
- Province: Buenos Aires
- Partido: General San Martín
- Elevation: 28 m (92 ft)

Population (2001 census [INDEC])
  - Total: 19,138
- CPA Base: B 1650
- Area code: +54 11

Billinghurst is a town in General San Martín Partido of Buenos Aires Province, Argentina. It is located in the Greater Buenos Aires urban agglomeration.

== Toponymy ==
The settlement is named after Mariano Billinghurst (26 November 1810 – 13 June 1892), an Argentine-born businessman of English descent who was extensively involved in the development of the railways in Buenos Aires and the homonymous province. His name is also present in the name of a street that joins Santa Fe in the Recoleta neighborhood of the city of Buenos Aires.
