= Club Banco Hipotecario =

Argentine sports club

(Argentina) Banco Hipotecario
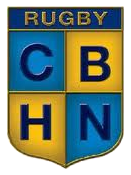
- Full name: Club del personal del Banco Hipotecario Nacional
- Union: URBA
- Nickname: Tecarios
- Founded: 15 December 1956; 69 years ago
- Location: Villa Celina, La Matanza, Argentina
- Ground: Villa Celina
- President: Alberto Toledo
- League: URBA Tercera División
- 2025: 10th.
Team kit

Club del Personal del Banco Hipotecario Nacional, mostly known as Banco Hipotecario, is an Argentine sports club based in Villa Celina, in La Matanza Partido of Greater Buenos Aires. The club was established in 1956 by employees of Banco Hipotecario, the main mortgage bank of Argentina.

The rugby union team competes in Tercera, the sixth division of the URBA league system. The club has also a women's rugby team competing in "Torneo Femenino", organised by the same body.

Banco Hipotecario also hosts other activities such as field hockey, swimming and artistic roller skating.

In 2011 some representatives of RSF (with former Puma Marcelo Loffreda as their most notable player) travelled to South Africa to play a match there with the objective to pay tribute to anti-apartheid leader Nelson Mandela. The organization has also an inclusive plan to encourage down syndrome children to practise the game of rugby, named "Rugby Inclusivo".
